= List of radio stations in Paraguay =

The following is a list radio stations in Paraguay which can be sorted by their name, frequencies, city, or website, updated to date.

== Asunción ==
Name	Frequency	City	Website
1° de Marzo	780 AM	Asunción	Website
ABC Cardinal	730 AM	Asunción	Website
ABC FM	98.5 FM	Asunción	Website
América	1480 AM	Asunción	Website
Amor	95.9 FM	Asunción	Website
Arami	89.9 FM	Asunción	Website
Aspen	102.7 FM	Asunción	Website
BBN	89.5 FM	Asunción	Website
Cámara	104.1 FM	Asunción	Website
Canal 100	100.1 FM	Asunción	Website
Cáritas	680 AM	Asunción	Website
Chaco Boreal	1330 AM	Asunción	Website
Conquistador	89.1 FM	Asunción	Website
Corazón	99.1 FM	Asunción	Website
Disney	96.5 FM	Asunción	Website
Dos	93.1 FM	Asunción	Website
El Eden	95.3 FM	Asunción	Website
Emisoras Paraguay	106.1 FM	Asunción	Website
Energy	92.1 FM	Asunción	Website
Estación 40	91.1 FM	Asunción	Website
Exclusiva	103.7 FM	Asunción	Website
Farra	101.3 FM	Asunción	Website
Fe y Alegría	1300 AM	Asunción	Website
La Deportiva	1120 AM	Asunción	Website
La Unión	800 AM	Asunción	Website
La Voz de la Liberación	1160 AM	Asunción	Website
La Voz de la Policia	750 AM	Asunción	Website
Latina	97.1 FM	Asunción	Website
Marangatú	87.9 FM	Asunción	Website
María	107.3 FM	Asunción	Website
Metropolis	93.7 FM	Asunción	Website
Memories	97.5 FM	Asunción	Website
Mix	90.1 FM	Asunción	Website
Montecarlo	100.9 FM	Asunción	Website
Monumental	1080 AM	Asunción	Website
Ñandutí	1020 AM	Asunción	Website
Nuevo Tiempo	97.9 FM	Asunción	Website
Obedira	102.1 FM	Asunción	Website
Obrero	101.7 FM	Asunción	
Palma	106.5 FM	Asunción	Website
Paraguay Korea (PKBS)	104.7 FM	Asunción	
Popular	103.1 FM	Asunción	Website
Radio Nacional del Paraguay	95.1 FM; 920 AM	Asunción	Website
Romance	104.5 FM	Asunción	Website
RQP	94.3 FM	Asunción	Website
Rock & Pop	95.5 FM	Asunción	Website
Sitramis	88.7 FM	Asunción	Website
San Pablo	94.9 FM	Asunción	Website
Siete	107.7 FM	Asunción	Website
Solidaridad	93.5 FM	Asunción	Website
Universo 970	970 AM	Asunción	Website
Uno	650 AM	Asunción	Website
Urbana	106.9 FM	Asunción	Website
Venus	105.1 FM	Asunción	Website
Vibras	92.7 FM	Asunción	Website
Ysapy	90.7 FM	Asunción	Website
Yvoty	93.5 FM	Asunción	Website

== Alto Paraguay ==
Name	Frequency	City	Website
Bahía Negra Poty	98.9 FM	Bahía Negra	
Alto Paraguay	99.9 FM	Capitán Carmelo Peralta	
La Voz del Pantanal	100.5 FM	Fuerte Olimpo	
Quebracho Poty	94.7 FM	Puerto Casado	

== Alto Paraná ==
Name	Frequency	City	Website
Radio Suceso FM	97.1 FM	Naranjal	Website
Estación 40	106.3 FM	Ciudad del Este	Website
Corpus	89.5 FM	Ciudad del Este	Website
Cielo Digital	88.7 FM	Ciudad del Este	Website
Cetro	90.5 FM	Ciudad del Este	Website
Mundial	95.7 FM	Ciudad del Este	Website
Virtual	97.3 FM	Ciudad del Este	Website
Educación	99.7 FM	Ciudad del Este	Website
Parque	102.5 FM; 550 AM	Ciudad del Este	Website
FM del Este	94.3 FM	Ciudad del Este	Website
ABC Cardinal	107.1 FM	Ciudad del Este	Website
Encuentro	93.5 FM	Ciudad del Este	Website
Itapirú	96.1 FM; 660 AM	Ciudad del Este	Website
Amazonas	107.5 FM	Ciudad del Este	Website
Magnificat	103.9 FM	Ciudad del Este	Website
Integración	104.3 FM	Ciudad del Este	Website
El Verbo	101.3 FM	Ciudad del Este	Website
La Voz del Este	1280 AM	Ciudad del Este	Website
Universo	92.5 FM	Ciudad del Este	Website
Activa	92.9 FM	Ciudad del Este	Website
Tierra	107.9 FM	Ciudad del Este	Website
Espíritu Santo	90.9 FM	Dr, Juan L. Mallorquín	Website
La Voz de la Libertad	1190 AM	Hernandarias	Website
Tacurú Pucú	88.7 FM	Hernandarias	
Transcontinental	98.1 FM	Hernandarias	Website
Guaraní	101.3 FM	Juan Emilio O'Leary	
Cedro Ty	103.5 FM	Los Cedrales	Website
Meridional	102.9 FM	Mbaracayú	Website
Adoración	91.9 FM	Minga Guazú	Website
Minga Guazú	107.5 FM	Minga Guazú	Website
Renacer	87.9 FM	Minga Guazú	Website
Naranjaty	103.3 FM	Naranjal	Website
Sintonía	107.7 FM	Naranjal	Website
Concierto	89.1 FM	Presidente Franco	Website
Teko Porá	96.5 FM	Presidente Franco	
Catolica	89.9 FM	San Alberto	Website
Pionera	95.3 FM	San Alberto	Website
Meridional	102.5 FM	San Alberto	Website
Adonai	104.9 FM	Santa Rita	Website
Luz	102.3 FM	Santa Rita	Website
Monday	101.5 FM	Santa Rita	Website
Progreso	88.3 FM	Santa Rita	Website
Santa Rita	93.9 FM	Santa Rita	Website
Sol	89.9 FM	Santa Rosa del Monday	Website
Yguazú	100.3 FM	Yguazú	Website

== Amambay ==
Name	Frequency	City	Website
Mariscal López	1480 AM	Bella Vista Norte	
Mega	96.3 FM	Bella Vista Norte	Website
Expresso	104.1 FM	Bella Vista Norte	Website
Frontera	92.5 FM	Bella Vista Norte	Website
Conquista	90.7 FM	Capitán Bado	Website
Capitán Bado	103.5 FM	Capitán Bado	Website
Amambay AM	570 AM	Pedro Juan Caballero	Website
Amambay FM	100.5 FM	Pedro Juan Caballero	Website
América	94.9 FM	Pedro Juan Caballero	Website
Cerro Corá	91.5 FM	Pedro Juan Caballero	Website
Estación 40	90.5 FM	Pedro Juan Caballero	Website
Jesús és El Salvador	88.3 FM	Pedro Juan Caballero	Website
Mburucuyá	980 AM	Pedro Juan Caballero	Website
Ministerio Cristiano	107.5 FM	Pedro Juan Caballero	
Oasis	94.3 FM	Pedro Juan Caballero	Website
Sin Fronteras	98.5 FM	Pedro Juan Caballero	Website
Terraza	95.5 FM	Pedro Juan Caballero	Website

== Boquerón ==
Name	Frequency	City	Website
Boquerón Poty	91.3 FM	Filadelfia	Website
Médano	99.7 FM	Filadelfia	Website
La Voz del Chaco Paraguayo	610 AM	Filadelfia	Website
Fe y Esperanza	88.9 FM	Loma Plata	
Loma Plata	94.9 FM	Loma Plata	
Chaco Boreal	103.5 FM	Loma Plata	Website
Neuland	91.9 FM	Neuland	Website
Mariscal Estigarribia	96.9 FM	Mariscal Estigarribia	

== Caaguazú ==
Name	Frequency	City	Website
Fraternal	88.5 FM	Caaguazú	
Clasica	92.7 FM	Caaguazú	
Tavarandú	96.1 FM	Caaguazú	
Comunitaria Pais	97.3 FM	Caaguazú	Website
Centenario	99.5 FM	Caaguazú	Website
Fama	100.5 FM	Caaguazú	Website
Horizonte	106.3 FM	Caaguazú	Website
Virtual	106.9 FM	Caaguazú	Website
Kaaguazú	640 AM	Caaguazú	Website
Carayao	98.3 FM	Carayao	Website
Oñondivepa	96.1 FM	Cecilio Báez	Website
Mensajero	100.9 FM	Colonia Tres Palmas	Website
Fantastica	96.5 FM	Coronel Oviedo	
América	95.3 FM	Coronel Oviedo	Website
Capital	90.1 FM	Coronel Oviedo	Website
Coronel Oviedo	1180 AM	Coronel Oviedo	
Cultural	87.9 FM	Coronel Oviedo	
Del Sol	91.9 FM	Coronel Oviedo	Website
Vive	104.3 FM	Coronel Oviedo	Website
Fuente de Agua Viva	96.1 FM	Coronel Oviedo	Website
Kaaguazú	640 AM	Coronel Oviedo	Website
Loor Gospel	89.5 FM	Coronel Oviedo	Website
Más	102.3 FM	Coronel Oviedo	Website
Tenondé	107.5 FM	Coronel Oviedo	Website
Campo 9	88.7 FM	Dr. J. E. Estigarribia	Website
Excelsior	96.5 FM	Dr. J. E. Estigarribia	Website
Pastoreo Ñua'i	94.9 FM	Dr. Juan Manuel Frutos	
Armonia	101.1 FM	Gal. Bernardino Caballero	
Sendero	89.7 FM	Moncho Cué	
Mensajero	100.9 FM	Raúl A. Oviedo	Website
Alborada	90.1 FM	Repatriación	Website
Clásica	92.7 FM	Repatriación	Website
Santidad	100.1 FM	Repatriación	Website
Nueva Esperanza	96.1 FM	R. I. Tres Corrales	
Arapy	107.5 FM	Santa Rosa del Mbutuy	Website
Sendero	89.5 FM	Tembiaporá	Website
Continental	95.7 FM	Vaquería	Website
Vaquería	97.3 FM	Vaquería	Website

== Caazapá ==
Name	Frequency	City	Website
Tuparendá	88.9 FM	Abaí	Website
Aurora	87.9 FM	Caazapá	
Caazapá Poty	98.1 FM	Caazapá	Website
Caazapá Digital	104.7 FM	Caazapá	Website
Hechizo	740 AM	Caazapá	Website
La Voz de Bolaños	100.3 FM	Caazapá	
Yerutí	103.9 FM	Caazapá	Website
Lider	102.3 FM	San Juan Nepomuceno	/ Website
Dinámica	101.1 FM	San Juan Nepomuceno	Website
Capiibary	104.5 FM	San Juan Nepomuceno	Website
Arapyahu	107.1 FM	Taruma	Website
Aguai Poty	90.5 FM	Yegros	Website
Itakarú	101.3 FM	Yuty	Website

== Canindeyú ==
Name	Frequency	City	Website
Pionero	101.9 FM	Corpus Christi	Website
Estrella	93.7 FM	Curuguaty	Website
Curuguaty	98.7 FM	Curuguaty	Website
Agricultura	101.3 FM	Curuguaty	Website
San Isidro	105.1 FM	Curuguaty	Website
Puente Kyjha	89.1 FM	General Francisco Álvarez	
El Mensú Comunicaciones	91.3 FM	General Francisco Álvarez	Website
San Luis	99.9 FM	General Francisco Álvarez	Website
Katueté	88.3 FM	Katueté	Website
Karapa	89.9 FM	Katueté	Website
Integración	96.9 FM	Katueté	Website
Nueva Dimensión	100.5 FM	Katueté	
Espiritu Santo Comunicaciones	90.9 FM	La Paloma del Espiritu Santo	Website
Agro	92.7 FM	Nueva Esperanza	Website
Takuara Comunicaciones	100.9 FM	Nueva Esperanza	Website
Salto del Guairá	90.3 FM	Salto del Guairá	Website
Ñe'endy	93.1 FM	Salto del Guairá	
Canindeyú	95.5 FM	Salto del Guairá	Website
Tricolor	96.7 FM	Salto del Guairá	Website
Digital	100.7 FM	Salto del Guairá	Website
Salto City	101.3 FM	Salto del Guairá	
Atalaya	106.1 FM	Salto del Guairá	
San Juan	104.5 FM	Yasy Cañy	Website
Ko'e Porã	103.7 FM	Villa Ygatimí	Website
Estación Sin Limites	95.1 FM	Ypehú	Website
Yvy Pytâ	100.7 FM	Yvy Pytâ	Website

== Central ==
Name	Frequency	City	Website
Areguá FM	87.9 FM	Areguá	Website
Divina Misericordia	102.9 FM	Areguá	Website
JV	104.3 FM	Areguá	Website
Redención	89.3 FM	Capiatá	
Kaakupemi Comunicaciones	90.3 FM	Capiatá	Website
Campo Verde	91.7 FM	Capiatá	Website
Universal	93.9 FM	Capiatá	Website
Comunidad	96.1 FM	Capiatá	Website
Pasión	98.1 FM	Capiatá	Website
Arapoty	99.9 FM	Capiatá	Website
Virgen de la Candelaria	101.7 FM	Capiatá	Website
Capiatá	102.9 FM	Capiatá	Website
Yvyraro	103.5 FM	Capiatá	Website
Brisa	103.9 FM	Capiatá	Website
Fernando de la Mora	92.7 FM	Fdo. de la Mora	Website
Oñondivepa	101.7 FM	Fdo. de la Mora	
Libre	1200 AM	Fdo. de la Mora	Website
Guarambaré	90.3 FM	Guarambaré	
29 de Agosto	95.3 FM	Guarambaré	
Sur	101.7 FM	Guarambaré	Website
Ita Poty	90.9 FM	Itá	Website
Ita FM	90.3 FM	Itá	Website
ARP	100.5 FM	Itá	Website
Inter	101.5 FM	Itá	Website
Caaguazu	106.7 FM	Itá	Website
3 de Febrero	87.9 FM	Itá	Website
Globo	92.1 FM	Itauguá	
Itauguá Poty	101.7 FM	Itauguá	Website
Sin Fronteras	96.3 FM	Itauguá	Website
Museo	88.1 FM	J. Augusto Saldívar	
San Miguel	98.9 FM	J. Augusto Saldívar	
Cardinal	730 AM	Lambaré	Website
Virgen del Rosario	87.9 FM	Lambaré	
Puerto Pabla	88.9 FM	Lambaré	
Los 40 Principales	92.3 FM	Lambaré	Website
Lambaré 2000	103.7 FM	Lambaré	
Unión	87.5 FM	Limpio	Website
Caparazón	89.7 FM	Limpio	Website
Santuario	101.7 FM	Limpio	
Mediterraneo	103.5 FM	Limpio	
Nanawa	1080 AM	Luque	Website
Pa’i García	87.5 FM	Luque	Website
La Voz de Luque	87.9 FM	Luque	
Inmaculada	88.9 FM	Luque	Website
Pescador	89.3 FM	Luque	
Kure Luque	90.3 FM	Luque	Website
HEi Radio	91.9 FM	Luque	Website
Santa Rosa	93.5 FM	Luque	
Azul y Oro	94.7 FM	Luque	Website
Ciudad	96.9 FM	Luque	
Vergel Luqueño	101.7 FM	Luque	Website
Vencedor	103.5 FM	Luque	
Radio Soy	En linea	Luque	Website
Música Paraguaya RS1	En linea	Luque	Website
Avivamiento	104.7 FM	Luque	
Ñemby	88.3 FM	Ñemby	Website
Arapyahu	93.7 FM	Ñemby	
Nueva Italia	96.3 FM	Nueva Italia	
San Antonio	96.1 FM	San Antonio	Website
Del Rey	103.3 FM	San Antonio	Website
Nuevo Mundo	1120 AM	San Lorenzo	
Aranduka	87.9 FM	San Lorenzo	Website
Vida	93.5 FM	San Lorenzo	Website
San Sebastián	101.7 FM	San Lorenzo	Website
Unión	104.7 FM	San Lorenzo	Website
Lucero	105.5 FM	San Lorenzo	Website
Puro Amor	107.5 FM	San Lorenzo	Website
Valle Pucú	104.5 FM	Valle Pucú	
Manantial	88.7 FM	Villeta	
El Vencedor	106.5 FM	Villeta	Website
Real	88.5 FM	Ypacaraí	
Omega	91.7 FM	Ypacaraí	
Holiday	89.9 FM	Ypané	Website
Ypané	92.5 FM	Ypané	
Potrerito Poty	93.5 FM	Ypané	Website
Los Angeles	102.5 FM	Ypané	Website

== Concepción ==
Name	Frequency	City	Website
Parque	88.1 FM	Azotey	Website
Lucero	94.7 FM	Azotey	
Belén Comunicaciones	89.3 FM	Belén	
Tropicana	91.1 FM	Concepción	
Primavera	91.9 FM	Concepción	Website
Norte Comunicaciones	94.5 FM	Concepción	Website
Mega Estación 95	95.9 FM	Concepción	Website
Aquidaban	100.5 FM	Concepción	Website
Activa	104.3 FM	Concepción	Website
La Costa	106.1 FM	Concepción	Website
Jardín	88.1 FM	Concepción	Website
Regional	660 AM	Concepción	Website
Concepción	1380 AM	Concepción	Website
Guyrá Campana	1420 AM	Horqueta	Website
Los Ángeles	89.9 FM	Horqueta	Website
Continental	95.3 FM	Horqueta	Website
Atalaya	102.7 FM	Horqueta	
Ciudad	97.5 FM	Loreto	Website
Primavera	91.9 FM	Primavera	Website
Itaporã	98.9 FM	Vallemí	Website
Favorita	93.3 FM	Yby Yaú	Website
Kaagata	100.3 FM	Yby Yaú	Website
Esperanza	104.5 FM	Yby Yaú	Website

== Cordillera ==
Name	Frequency	City	Website
Centro	89.7 FM	Altos	Website
RCA	100.3 FM	Altos	
Arroyos y Esteros	87.9 FM	Arroyos y Esteros	
Manduvira	88.9 FM	Arroyos y Esteros	Website
Atyrá	105.7 FM	Atyrá	Website
La Voz de la Cordillera	860 AM	Caacupé	Website
San Miguel	87.9 FM	Caacupé	Website
Serranía	99.7 FM	Caacupé	Website
Estación Cordillera	101.9 FM	Caacupé	Website
La Voz Comunitaria	103.3 FM	Caacupé	
Mega	103.7 FM	Caacupé	
Caraguatay	90.3 FM	Caraguatay	Website
Las Mercedes	104.5 FM	Caraguatay	Website
San Agustín	102.5 FM	Emboscada	
Evolución	89.3 FM	Eusebio Ayala	Website
MDQ	101.1 FM	Eusebio Ayala	Website
Yhaguy	94.1 FM	Itacurubí de la Cordillera	
Jardín	98.9 FM	Itacurubí de la Cordillera	Website
Mainumby	104.1 FM	Itacurubí de la Cordillera	
Altos	89.7 FM	Loma Grande	Website
Mbocaya Poty	95.7 FM	Mbocayaty del Yhaguy	
Piribebuy	96.7 FM	Piribebuy	Website
Parque Vida	101.5 FM	Piribebuy	Website
Primereña	106.5 FM	1º de Marzo	Website
Santa Elena	107.3 FM	Santa Elena	
Cristal	96.1 FM	Tobati	Website
Tajy Poty	103.3 FM	Tobati	Website
Tobati Comunicaciones	103.9 FM	Tobati	
Centro	104.3 FM	Tobati	
Valenzuela	107.5 FM	Valenzuela	

== Guairá ==
Name	Frequency	City	Website
Nueva Vida	90.9 FM	Colonia Independencia	
Estación 40	93.7 FM	Colonia Independencia	Website
Milenium	95.9 FM	Mauricio J. Troche	
Hits	98.1 FM	Mbocayaty del Guairá	
María	107.9 FM	Natalicio Talavera	Website
Babilonia	97.7 FM	Paso Yovai	Website
Paso Yobai	105.7 FM	Paso Yovai	
Panambi Vera	1140 AM	Villarrica	Website
Ebenezer	89.7 FM	Villarrica	
Satelital	91.3 FM	Villarrica	Website
Transamerica	94.7 FM	Villarrica	Website
Visión	97.5 FM	Villarrica	Website
Ybytyruzu	100.7 FM	Villarrica	Website
Santa Lucia	101.3 FM	Villarrica	
Guairá	103.5 FM	Villarrica	Website
Santidad	106.5 FM	Villarrica	Website

== Itapúa ==
Name	Frequency	City	Website
Ynambu	98.3 FM	Alto Verá	Website
La Voz de Alto Verá	99.3 FM	Alto Verá	
San Fernando	100.3 FM	Bella Vista	Website
Ka'aguy Poty	96.3 FM	Capitán Meza	Website
Perla del Sur	103.3 FM	Capitán Miranda	Website
Naipi	92.5 FM	Carlos Antonio López	Website
Integral	94.9 FM	Carlos Antonio López	Website
San Lorenzo	98.9 FM	Carlos Antonio López	Website
7 de Agosto	100.1 FM	Carlos Antonio López	Website
Costanera del Sur	98.5 FM	Carmen del Paraná	Website
Oasis	103.5 FM	Carmen del Paraná	Website
Marandu	88.7 FM	Coronel Bogado	Website
Santa Librada	94.7 FM	Coronel Bogado	Website
Parque	97.3 FM	Coronel Bogado	Website
Nazareno	90.5 FM	Edelira	
Ka'aguy Ñe'e	104.1 FM	Edelira	Website
Bendición del Sur	106.7 FM	Edelira	Website
Paraná	89.7 FM	Encarnación	
Pop	93.3 FM	Encarnación	Website
Encarnación	95.7 FM	Encarnación	Website
La Voz de la Esperanza	99.1 FM	Encarnación	
San Pedro	101.3 FM	Encarnación	
Itapúa	102.5 FM	Encarnación	Website
Santa Helena	103.9 FM	Encarnación	Website
Pykasu	90.1 FM	General Artigas	Website
Horizonte	93.5 FM	General Artigas	Website
Fuente de Vida	103.1 FM	General Artigas	
Yvy Pytá	94.1 FM	Hohenau	Website
Nuevo Amanecer	95.3 FM	Mayor Otaño	Website
Naranjaty	103.3 FM	Naranjal	Website
Portal de Itapúa	96.7 FM	Naranjito	
Naranjito	99.3 FM	Naranjito	
Triunfo	93.1 FM	Natalio	Website
Original	95.9 FM	Natalio	Website
Nueva Alborada	87.9 FM	Nueva Alborada	Website
Alternativa	92.7 FM	Obligado	Website
Kokue Poty	97.9 FM	Tomás Romero Pereira	Website
Manaem	105.7 FM	Tomás Romero Pereira	
Caracol	102.7 FM	Yatytay	Website
Yatytay	106.9 FM	Yatytay	Website
Oñondivepa	102.3 FM	Itapua Poty	Website

== Misiones ==
Name	Frequency	City	Website
Ayolas	98.3 FM	Ayolas	Website
Corpus	94.5 FM	Ayolas	Website
San Roque González	570 AM	Ayolas	
Activa	95.3 FM	San Ignacio	Website
Arapysandú	1040 AM	San Ignacio	Website
Del Sol	93.3 FM	San Ignacio	
Libertad	96.3 FM	San Ignacio	Website
Monseñor Pastor Bogarín Argaña	88.1 FM	San Ignacio	Website
San Ignacio	89.7 FM	San Ignacio	Website
Unasur	93.7 FM; 97.5 FM	San Ignacio	Website
Libertad	96.3 FM	San Ignacio	Website
Espectador	94.7 FM	San Juan Bta.	Website
Misiones	91.5 FM	San Juan Bta.	Website
Mangoré	1430 AM	San Juan Bta.	Website
San Juan	99.5 FM	San Juan Bta.	Website
San Patricio	106.7 FM	San Patricio	Website
Nuevo Amanecer	105.3 FM	Santa María	Website
Sangurí	90.7 FM	Santa Rosa	Website
Santa Rosa	95.1 FM	Santa Rosa	Website
Ita Morotí	101.1 FM	Santa Rosa	
Metro	106.1 FM	Santa Rosa	Website
Yvera	88.3 FM	Villa Florida	Website
Florida	104.3 FM	Villa Florida	

== Ñeembucú ==
Name	Frequency	City	Website
Boquerón	99.3 FM	Alberdi	Website
Humaita	106.7 FM	Alberdi	
Jasy	101.3 FM	Humaitá	
Ko'e Pyta	96.7 FM	Isla Ombu	
Arapy	98.1 FM	Pilar	Website
Carlos Antonio López	700 AM	Pilar	Website
Nativa	94.9 FM	Pilar	
Nueva Vida	96.3 FM	Pilar	Website
Patria Soñada	104.1 FM	Pilar	Website
Pilar	106.9 FM	Pilar	Website
Plus	91.9 FM	Pilar	Website
Renacer	88.1 FM	Pilar	Website
Sintonía	99.9 FM	Pilar	Website
Tropical	88.7 FM	Pilar	Website
San Sebastian	87.9 FM	Pirayú	
Pirayú	99.3 FM	Pirayú	

== Paraguarí ==
Name	Frequency	City	Website
Gratitud	102.5 FM	Acahay	Website
La Voz de Acahay	106.7 FM	Acahay	
CAAPUCÚ	91.7 FM	Caapucú	Website
Diferente	91.9 FM	Carapeguá	Website
Panamericana	93.5 FM	Carapeguá	Website
Magic	97.1 FM	Carapeguá	
Colonia	88.1 FM	La Colmena	Website
Colmenar	92.5 FM	La Colmena	Website
Mbuyapey	87.9 FM	Mbuyapey	Website
Paraguarí	96.9 FM	Paraguarí	Website
Express Paraguay	98.9 FM	Paraguarí	Website
Radio 10	106.5 FM	Paraguarí	
Primera en Musica	107.1 FM	Paraguarí	Website
Manantial	96.1 FM	Quiindy	
Quiindy	104.7 FM	Quiindy	Website
Chirikoe	102.9 FM	Quyquyó	
Yaguarón Poty	87.9 FM	Yaguarón	Website
Yaguarón	96.1 FM	Yaguarón	Website
La Rosada	90.1 FM	Ybycui	
La Paz	93.3 FM	Ybycui	Website
Amistad	94.1 FM	Ybycui	Website

== Presidente Hayes ==
Name	Frequency	City	Website
Libre	101.7 FM	Benjamin Aceval	Website
Campo Aceval	98.7 FM	Campo Aceval	
Río Verde	99.5 FM	Río Verde	
Pa'i Puku	720 AM	Tte. Irala Fernández	Website
Dos Cocos	90.3 FM	Tte. Irala Fernández	Website
Chaco	105.5 FM	Villa Hayes	
Sagrado Corazón de Jesús	90.5 FM	Villa Hayes	
Sembrador	88.7 FM	Villa Hayes	
Tavarandú	99.3 FM	Villa Hayes	
Villa Hayes	106.5 FM	Villa Hayes	Website

== San Pedro ==
Name	Frequency	City	Website
Manantial	90.3 FM	Capiibary	Website
Choré	88.5 FM	Choré	Website
Magica	88.9 FM	Choré	Website
Primero de Mayo	90.3 FM	Choré	
San Juan Bautista	104.7 FM	Choré	Website
Shofar	100.5 FM	Choré	Website
Amistad	91.3 FM	Gral. Aquino	Website
Betesda	89.1 FM	Gral. Aquino	
General Aquino	103.5 FM	Gral. Aquino	Website
Jejui Guazú	93.5 FM	Gral. Resquín	
La Paz	95.5 FM	Gral. Resquín	Website
Oñondivepa	97.7 FM	Gral. Resquín	
Naranjito	102.5 FM	Gral. Resquín	
Guayaibí	90.1 FM	Guayaibí	
Kokue Puahy	96.3 FM	Guayaibí	
Kuarahy	91.7 FM	Guayaibí	Website
Friesland	101.7 FM	Itacurubí del Rosario	Website
Genesis	104.7 FM	Itacurubí del Rosario	Website
Jhuguarey	89.9 FM	Jhuguarey	Website
Kokueré	99.5 FM	Kokueré	Website
Radio 20	96.5 FM	Liberación	Website
Joaihú	99.5 FM	Liberación	Website
Liberación	101.5 FM	Liberación	Website
Corazón del Norte	89.9 FM	Lima	
Mboi'y	102.9 FM	Mboi'y	
Moises Bertoni	101.3 FM	Moises Bertoni	
Nueva Germania	106.5 FM	Nueva Germania	Website
Antequera	89.7 FM	Puerto Antequera	Website
Costanera	101.7 FM	Puerto Antequera	Website
Ñasaindy	620 AM	San Estanislao	Website
Tapiracuái	88.7 FM	San Estanislao	Website
Ciudad	92.9 FM	San Estanislao	Website
Libertad	95.7 FM	San Estanislao	Website
Santaní	98.1 FM	San Estanislao	Website
Máster	102.5 FM	San Estanislao	website
Kokueré	99.5 FM	San Pablo	Website
Del Sol	90.7 FM	San Pedro	Website
Unión	92.1 FM	San Pedro	Website
La Voz del Campesino	92.7 FM	San Pedro	
San Pedro	93.7 FM	San Pedro	Website
San Antonio	96.1 FM	San Pedro	
Integral	96.3 FM	San Pedro	
Ycuamandyyú	590 AM	San Pedro	Website
Digital	87.9 FM	Santa Rosa del Aguaray	Website
Ko'eju	89.1 FM	Santa Rosa del Aguaray	Website
San Pablo	89.5 FM	Santa Rosa del Aguaray	Website
American	97.5 FM	Santa Rosa del Aguaray	
Yvagarape	94.1 FM	Santa Rosa del Aguaray	Website
Aguaray	103.5 FM	Santa Rosa del Aguaray	Website
Simon Bolivar	107.9 FM	Santa Rosa del Aguaray	
Centro	95.1 FM	Unión	Website
Portal del Norte	90.9 FM	Yataity del Norte	Website
Gracia Divina	93.5 FM	Yataity del Norte	Website
