= List of universities in Paraguay =

This is a sortable list of higher education (Educación Superior) institutions in Paraguay. In 2025, there are at least 55 universities, including 9 public and 46 private, in Paraguay.

== Universities ==
=== Public ===
Institution name	Acronym	Established	Main campus	Branches	Website
Universidad Nacional de Asunción	UNA	1889	San Lorenzo	Pedro Juan Caballero; Caacupé; San Juan Bautista; Santa Rosa; Caazapá; Villarrica; Coronel Oviedo; Caaguazú; Paraguarí; Villa Hayes; San Pedro; San Estanislao; Loma Plata; Benjamín Aceval	www.una.py
Universidad Nacional de Pilar	UNP	1991	Pilar	San Ignacio; Ayolas; San Juan Bautista	www.unp.edu.py
Universidad Nacional del Este	UNE	1993	Ciudad del Este	Santa Rita; Curuguaty; Salto del Guairá; Juan Leon Mallorquin; Itakyry	www.une.edu.py
Universidad Nacional de Itapúa	UNI	1996	Encarnación	San Pedro del Paraná; General Artigas; Coronel Bogado; Tomás Romero Pereira; Natalio	www.uni.edu.py
Universidad Nacional de Caaguazú	UNCA	2007	Coronel Oviedo		www.unca.edu.py
Universidad Nacional de Concepción	UNC	2007	Concepción	Horqueta	www.unc.edu.py
Universidad Nacional de Villarrica	UNVES	2007	Villarrica	Carapeguá	www.unves.edu.py
Universidad Nacional de Canindeyú	UNICAN	2010	Salto del Guairá		www.unican.edu.py
Universidad Politecnica Taiwan - Paraguay	UPTP	2018	Asunción		https://uptp.edu.py/
Universidad Nacional de Misiones	Unamis	2023	Misiones		

=== Private ===
Institution name	Acronym	Established	Main campus	Branches	Website
Universidad Católica Nuestra Señora de la Asunción	UCA	1960	Asunción	Caacupé; Carapeguá; Concepción; Coronel Oviedo; Encarnación; Guarambaré; Hernandarias; Hohenau; Pedro Juan Caballero; San Ignacio; Santa Rita; Tomás Romero Pereira; Villarrica	www.universidadcatolica.edu.py
Universidad Columbia del Paraguay	-	1991	Asunción	San Lorenzo; Pedro Juan Caballero	www.columbia.edu.py
Universidad del Norte	UNINORTE	1991	Asunción	Caacupé; Caaguazú; Carapeguá; Ciudad del Este; Concepción; Coronel Oviedo; Curuguaty; Encarnación; Itá; Itauguá; Luque; Pedro Juan Caballero; San Estanislao; San Ignacio; San Pedro; Villa Hayes; Villarrica	www.uninorte.edu.py
Universidad Autónoma de Asunción	UAA	1991	Asunción		www.uaa.edu.py
Universidad Privada del Este	UPE	1992	Presidente Franco	Ciudad del Este; Hernandarias; Minga Guazú; Asunción; Santa Rita	www.upe.edu.py
Universidad Autónoma del Paraguay	UAP	1992	Asunción		www.uap.edu.py
Universidad Comunera	UCOM	1992	Asunción	San Lorenzo	www.ucom.edu.py
Universidad Americana	UA	1994	Asunción	Ciudad del Este; Encarnación	www.uamericana.edu.py
Universidad Evangélica del Paraguay	UEP	1994	Asunción	Loma Plata	www.universidadevangelica.edu.py
Universidad del Pacífico	UP	1994	Asunción	San Lorenzo; Pedro Juan Caballero	www.upacifico.edu.py
Universidad Tecnológica Intercontinental	UTIC	1996	Asunción	Fernando de la Mora; Luque; Ñemby; San Lorenzo; Capiatá; Caacupé; Caaguazú; J. E. Estigarribia; Ciudad del Este; Hernandarias	www.utic.edu.py
Universidad Técnica de Comercialización y Desarrollo	UTCD	1996	Fernando de la Mora	Asunción; Caacupé; Caaguazú; Capiatá; Caazapá; Ciudad del Este; Coronel Bogado; Coronel Oviedo; Choré; Encarnación; Hohenau; Horqueta; Itá; Yuty; Villeta; Katueté; Limpio; Lambaré; Luque; Mariano Roque Alonso; Ñemby; Paraguarí; Pedro Juan Caballero; Salto del Guairá; San Estanislao; San Lorenzo; Santa Rita; Villarrica; San Alberto	www.utcd.edu.py
Universidad Politécnica y Artística del Paraguay	UPAP	1996	Asunción		www.upap.edu.py
Universidad del Cono Sur de Las Americas	UCSA	1996	Asunción		www.ucsa.edu.py
Universidad Autónoma de Luque	UAL	1999	Luque		www.ual.edu.py
Universidad Iberoamericana	UNIBE	2001	Asunción		www.unibe.edu.py
Universidad Metropolitana de Asunción	UMA	2003	Asunción		www.uma.edu.py
Universidad de la Integración de las Américas	UNIDA	2003	Asunción		www.unida.edu.py
Universidad Internacional Tres Fronteras	UNINTER	2003	Ciudad del Este	Asunción; Caaguazú; J. Eulogio Estigarribia; Juan M. Frutos; Carapeguá; Carmen del Paraná; Capiatá; Juan L. Mallorquín; Edelira; Encarnación; Eusebio Ayala; Guayaibí; Hernandarias; Minga Guazú; Paraguarí; Pedro Juan Caballero; Quiíndy; Juan E. O'Leary	www.uninter.edu.py
Universidad La Paz	ULP	2006	Ciudad del Este		www.universidadlapaz.edu.py
Universidad Central del Paraguay	UCP	2006	Asunción		www.central.edu.py
Universidad Autónoma San Sebastián	UASS	2007	San Lorenzo		www.sansebastian.edu.py
Universidad Privada del Guairá	UPG	2007	Villarrica	Asunción; San Juan Nepomuceno; Presidente Franco; La Colmena; Caaguazú; Paso Yobai	www.uniupg.edu.py
Universidad del Nordeste del Paraguay		2007	Asunción		
Universidad de Desarrollo Sustentable	UDS	2007	Asunción		www.uds.edu.py
Universidad San Carlos	USC	2007	Asunción	Horqueta; Encarnación; San Estanislao; Villa Hayes; Curuguaty; Itá; San Cristóbal; Ciudad del Este; Caaguazú; San Juan Nepomuceno; Pedro Juan Caballero; Bella Vista; Eusebio Ayala	www.sancarlos.edu.py
Universidad San Lorenzo	UNISAL	2007	San Lorenzo	Asunción; Caaguazú; Carapeguá; Capiatá; Choré; Ciudad del Este; Coronel Oviedo; Itauguá; Lambaré; Pilar; Villarrica	www.unisal.edu.py
Universidad Autónoma de Encarnación	UNAE	2007	Encarnación	Hohenau	www.unae.edu.py
Universidad Autónoma del Sur	UNASUR	2007	Asunción	San Ignacio	www.unasur.edu.py
Universidad Hispano Guaraní	UHG	2008	Asunción	Coronel Oviedo; San Juan Bautista	www.hispanoguarani.edu.py
Universidad María Auxiliadora	UMAX	2008	Asunción		www.umax.edu.py
Universidad Superior Hernando Arias de Saavedra		2008	Luque		www.has.edu.py
Universidad Española		2008	Asunción		www.ue.edu.py
Universidad Leonardo Da Vinci	ULDV	2008	Luque	Asunción; Arroyos y Esteros; Fernando de la Mora; Encarnación	www.uldv.com.py
Universidad Nihon Gakko	UNG	2008	Fernando de la Mora		
Universidad María Serrana		2008	Asunción		www.serranauniversidad.edu.py
Universidad Centro Médico Bautista	UCMB	2009	Asunción		www.ucmb.edu.py
Universidad Santa Clara de Asís	USCA	2009	Caaguazú		www.usca.edupy.net
Universidad Sudamericana		2009	Luque	Asunción; Capiatá; San Lorenzo; Mariano Roque Alonso; Encarnación	www.universidadsudamericana.edu.py
Universidad del Chaco	UNICHACO	2009	Villa Hayes	Asunción; Coronel Oviedo; Fernando de la Mora; Pilar	www.unichaco.com
Universidad Gran Asunción	UNIGRAN	2009	Capiatá	Itá; Luque; Mariano Roque Alonso; Minga Guazú; San Alberto; San Lorenzo; Villa Elisa; Ybycuí	www.unigran.edu.py
Universidad Adventista del Paraguay	UNAPY	2009	Asunción		www.unapy.edu.py
Universidad Interamericana		2010	Asunción		www.interamericana.edu.py
Universidad del Sol		2011	Asunción		www.unades.edu.py
Universidad Paraguayo Alemana	UPA	2013	San Lorenzo		www.upa.edu.py
Universidad Central del Paraguay	UCP	2006	Pedro Juan Caballero	Ciudad Del Este	www.central.edu.py

== See also ==
- List of schools in Paraguay
- List of universities and colleges by country
