= Districts of Paraguay =

The departments of Paraguay are divided into districts (Spanish: distritos; Guarani: táva).

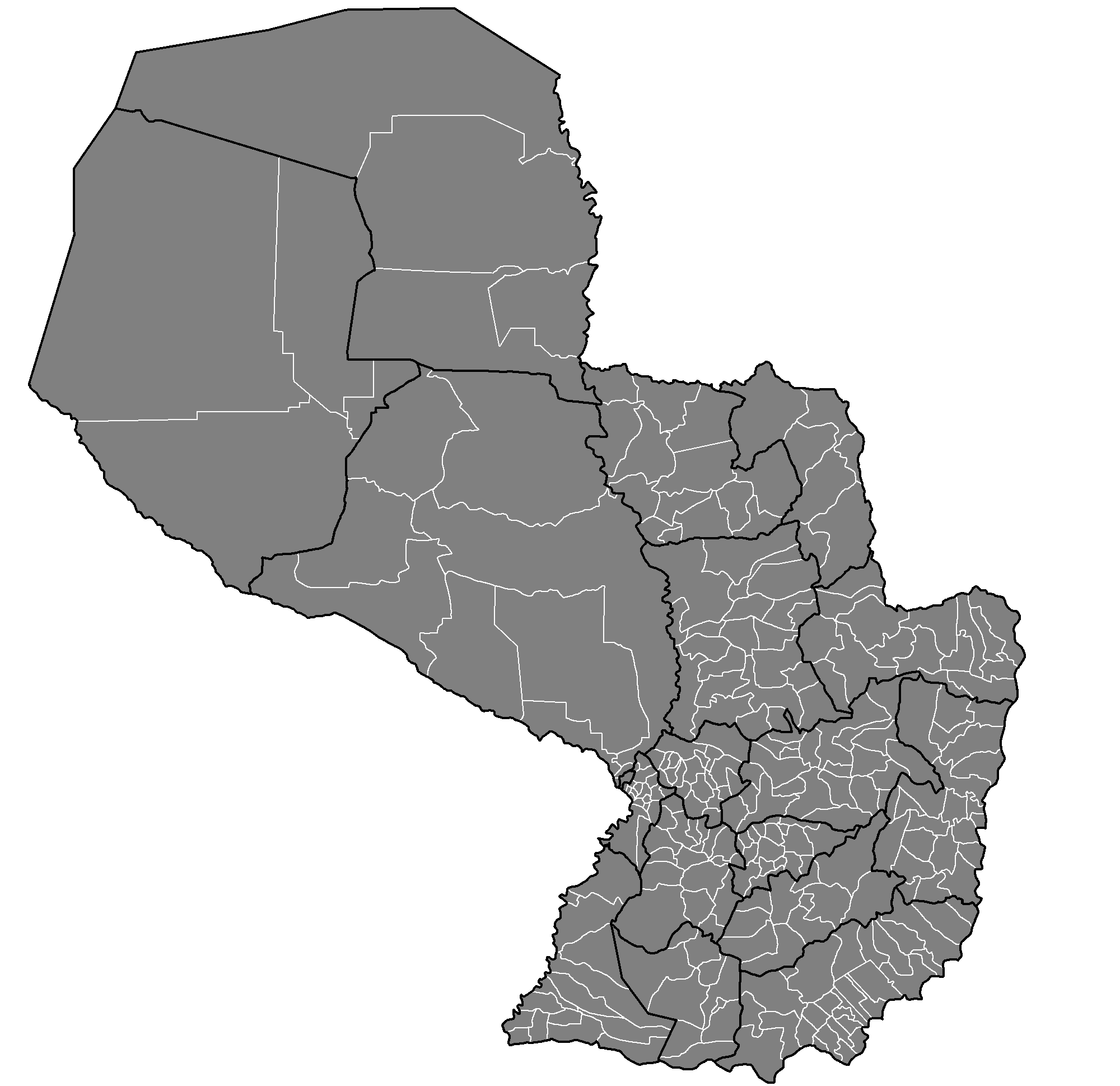
District Map of Paraguay

== List of districts ==
List of 161 of the 262 districts of Paraguay, showing the population (2002 census) and the department.

District	Population	Department
Abaí	26,175	Caazapá
Alto Verá	13,799	Itapúa
Antequera	3,426	San Pedro
Areguá	44,566	Central
Asunción	512,112	Capital District
Ayolas	15,219	Misiones
Azotey	5,031	Concepción
Bahía Negra	1,432	Alto Paraguay
Belén	9,112	Concepción
Bella Vista Norte	9,611	Amambay
Bella Vista Sur	9,193	Itapúa
Benjamín Aceval	13,309	Presidente Hayes
Buena Vista	5,340	Caazapá
Caaguazú	98,136	Caaguazú
Caazapá	22,372	Caazapá
Cambyretá	9,193	Itapúa
Carayaó	13,234	Caaguazú
Carmelo Peralta	2,393	Alto Paraguay
Capiatá	154,274	Central
Capiibary	25,841	San Pedro
Capitán Bado	17,117	Amambay
Capitán Meza	9,193	Itapúa
Capitán Miranda	9,193	Itapúa
Carlos Antonio López	17,622	Itapúa
Carmen del Paraná	9,193	Itapúa
Choré	36,019	San Pedro
Ciudad del Este	222,274	Alto Paraná
Concepción	73,210	Concepción
Coronel Bogado	17,065	Itapúa
Coronel Oviedo	84,103	Caaguazú
Doctor Cecilio Báez	6,173	Caaguazú
Doctor Eulogio Estigarribia	24,634	Caaguazú
Doctor Juan León Mallorquín	16,243	Alto Paraná
Doctor Juan Manuel Frutos	19,128	Caaguazú
Doctor Moisés Bertoni	4,616	Caazapá
Domingo Martínez de Irala	6,734	Alto Paraná
Edelira	22,287	Itapúa
Encarnación	93,497	Itapúa
Fernando de la Mora	113,560	Central
Filadelfia	(*)	Boquerón
Fram	6,923	Itapúa
Fuerte Olimpo	5,029	Alto Paraguay
Fulgencio Yegros	5,958	Caazapá
General Artigas	11,042	Itapúa
General José María Bruguez	(*)	Presidente Hayes
General Delgado	6,611	Itapúa
General Elizardo Aquino	21,607	San Pedro
General Higinio Morínigo	5,499	Caazapá
General Isidoro Resquín	22,350	San Pedro
Guarambaré	16,687	Central
Guayaibí	31,359	San Pedro
Hernandarias	63,248	Alto Paraná
Hohenau	9,685	Itapúa
Horqueta	52,573	Concepción
Iruña	4,710	Alto Paraná
Itá	50,391	Central
Itacurubí del Rosario	11,083	San Pedro
Itakyry	23,765	Alto Paraná
Itauguá	60,601	Central
Itapúa Poty	14,642	Itapúa
Jesús	5,560	Itapúa
José Domingo Ocampos	9,198	Caaguazú
José Falcón	3,189	Presidente Hayes
Juan Augusto Saldívar	37,374	Central
Juan Emilio O'Leary	16,367	Alto Paraná
Karapaí	5,468	Amambay
La Pastora	4,440	Caaguazú
La Paz	3,076	Itapúa
Lambaré	119,795	Central
Leandro Oviedo	4,353	Itapúa
Liberación	12,287	San Pedro
Lima	10,390	San Pedro
Limpio	73,158	Central
Loma Plata	8,547	Boquerón
Loreto	15,731	Concepción
Los Cedrales	9,003	Alto Paraná
Luque	185,127	Central
Maciel	3,957	Caazapá
Mariano Roque Alonso	65,229	Central
Mariscal Francisco Solano López	7,330	Caaguazú
Mariscal Estigarribia	41,106	Boquerón
Mayor Otaño	12,157	Itapúa
Mbaracayú	8,337	Alto Paraná
Minga Guazú	48,006	Alto Paraná
Minga Porá	11,180	Alto Paraná
Nanawa (Puerto Elsa)	4,830	Presidente Hayes
Naranjal	11,921	Alto Paraná
Natalio	19,456	Itapúa
Neuland	(*)	Boquerón
Nueva Alborada	9,193	Itapúa
Nueva Germania	4,202	San Pedro
Nueva Italia	8,525	Central
Nueva Londres	4,110	Caaguazú
Ñacunday	8,403	Alto Paraná
Ñemby	71,909	Central
Obligado	11,441	Itapúa
Paso Barreto	2,265	Concepción
Pedro Juan Caballero	88,189	Amambay
Pirapó	6,754	Itapúa
Presidente Franco	52,826	Alto Paraná
Puerto Casado	6,558	Alto Paraguay
Puerto Pinasco	3,948	Presidente Hayes
Raúl Arsenio Oviedo	27,734	Caaguazú
Repatriación	29,503	Caaguazú
R. I. Tres Corrales	7,666	Caaguazú
San Alberto	11,523	Alto Paraná
San Alfredo	2,566	Concepción
San Antonio	37,795	Central
San Carlos del Apa	2,174	Concepción
San Cosme y Damián	7,322	Itapúa
San Cristóbal	7,670	Alto Paraná
San Estanislao	49,249	San Pedro
San Ignacio	24,003	Misiones
San Joaquín	14,930	Caaguazú
San José de los Arroyos	15,299	Caaguazú
San Juan Bautista	16,563	Misiones
San Juan del Paraná	7,091	Itapúa
San Juan Nepomuceno	24,243	Caazapá
San Lázaro	9,060	Concepción
San Lorenzo	204,356	Central
San Miguel	5,253	Misiones
San Pablo	3,645	San Pedro
San Patricio	3,570	Misiones
San Pedro del Paraná	28,598	Itapúa
San Pedro de Ycuamandiyú	29,097	San Pedro
San Rafael del Paraná	20,434	Itapúa
Santa Fe del Paraná	2,095	Alto Paraná
Santa María	7,385	Misiones
Santa Rita	16,427	Alto Paraná
Santa Rosa de Lima	17,612	Misiones
Santa Rosa del Aguaray	20,473	San Pedro
Sargento José Félix López	3,510	Concepción
Santa Rosa del Mbutuy	10,989	Caaguazú
Santa Rosa del Monday	11,287	Alto Paraná
Santiago	6,751	Misiones
Simón Bolívar	4,938	Caaguazú
Tacuatí	11,301	San Pedro
Tavaí	13,354	Caazapá
Tembiaporá	7,771	Caaguazú
Teniente Esteban Martínez	3,521	Presidente Hayes
Teniente Irala Fernández	28,162	Presidente Hayes
Tomás Romero Pereira	27,239	Itapúa
Tres de Febrero	8,818	Caaguazú
Trinidad	6,873	Itapúa
Unión	5,406	San Pedro
Vaquería	10,257	Caaguazú
Veinticinco de Diciembre	9,147	San Pedro
Villa Elisa	53,166	Central
Villa Hayes	57,217	Presidente Hayes
Villeta	22,429	Central
Ypacaraí	18,530	Central
Ypané	25,421	Central
Villa del Rosario	11,623	San Pedro
Villa Florida	2,576	Misiones
Yabebyry	2,851	Misiones
Yataity del Norte	12,480	San Pedro
Yatytay	11,415	Itapúa
Yby Yaú	19,764	Concepción
Yguazú	8,748	Alto Paraná
Yhú	34,737	Caaguazú
Yrybucuá	16,757	San Pedro
Yuty	28,003	Caazapá
Zanja Pytá	8,165	Amambay

(*) This district was created recently, no official data is available.
