= San Rafael Reserve of Manageable Resources =

Protected area in Itapúa, Paraguay

The San Rafael Reserve of Manageable Resources is one of the most important reserves of natural resources in Paraguay.

== Location ==
It is located to the north of Itapúa department and to the south of Caazapá, about 450 kilometers from Asunción. It crosses the districts: Tabaí, San Juan Nepomuceno and Yuty, in Caazapá, and San Rafael del Paraná, Tomás Romero Pereira, Edelira, Itapua Poty, Alto Verá and San Pedro del Paraná, in Itapúa department.

In 1992 the place was designated a national park and in March 2002 it was elevated to the category of Reserve of Manageable Resources. It extends for 73,000 hectares and is part of the 15 ecological regions of the Bosque Atlántico del Alto Paraná (Atlantic Forest of Alto Paraná).

In San Rafael is the largest fresh water reserve: The Guaraní Aquifer.

== Rivers and streams ==
In the San Rafael Cordillera flow the rivers Tebicuary and Pirapó, which irrigate the agricultural areas.

Many rivers and other water sources flow to the rivers: Paraguay and Paraná. The Tebicuary River is the most important tributary in the left margin of the Paraguay River, it flows from the Yvyturuzú Cordillera and crosses through Caaguazú and San Rafael; it extends for about 654 kilometers. A fire in this area in 2005-2006 affected 1,850 hectares.

== Fauna ==
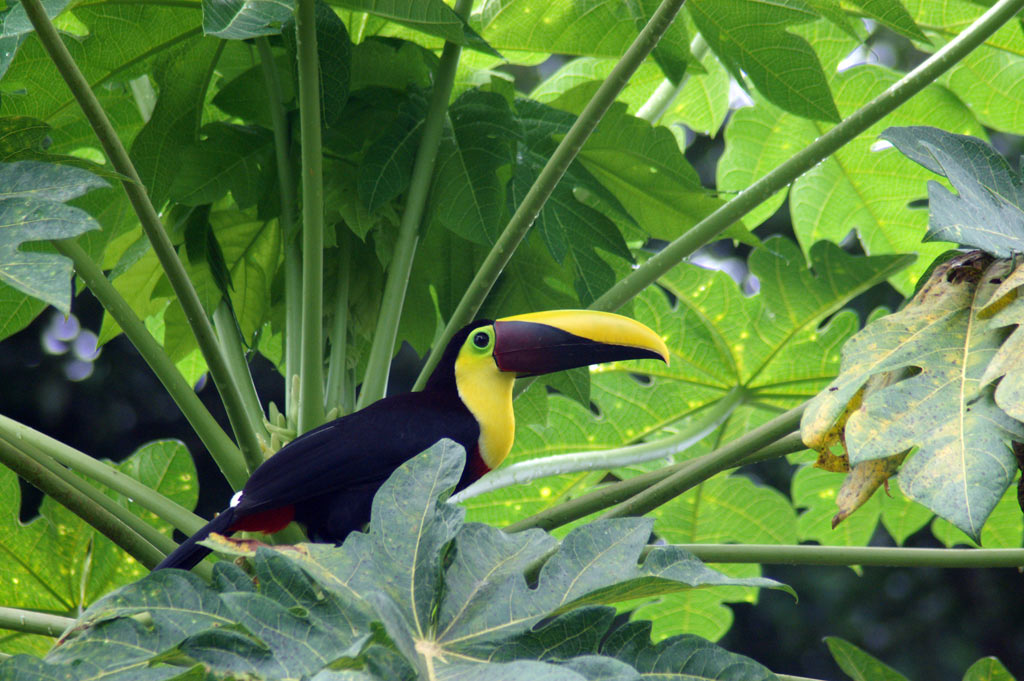
Toucan

Different animal species have been identified in the reserve: 52 species of fishes, 4 of reptiles, 61 of mammals and 500 of invertebrates.

The area is considered the “most important bird area” because 392 species of birds have been identified in the reserve, including the campana bird (bell bird, the national bird of Paraguay) and the chopí saiyú.

The park is also the only place in Paraguay where there have been sightings of the “morena” eagle or “harpía”, maracaná, red and blue parrot, yacutinga, yellow toucan and golden woodpecker, among others.

Among the mammals that live in the region are the puma (an endangered species), tapir and jaguar yvyguy, the only south-American canine animal that hunts in packs.

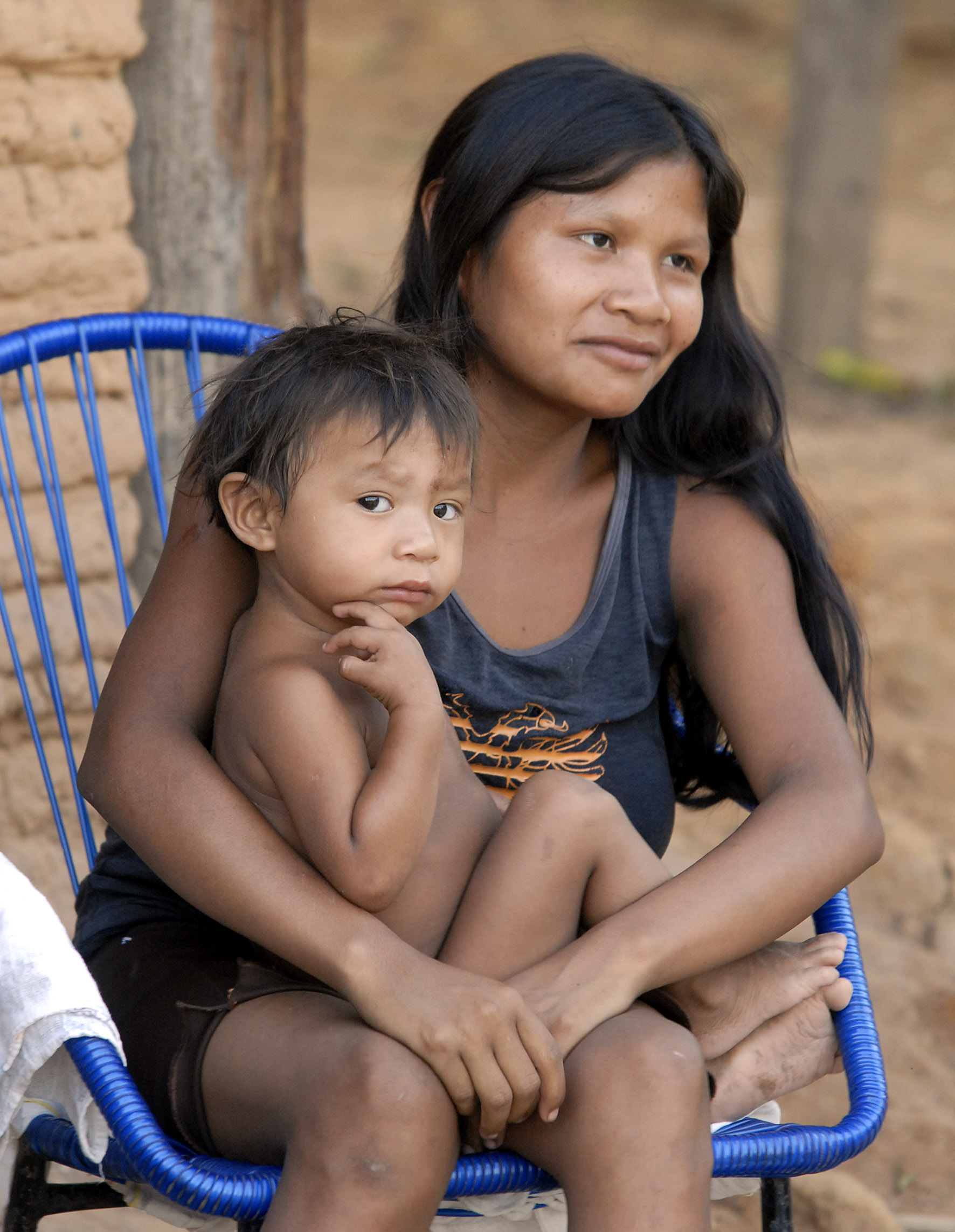
Mbya Guaraní mother and son

== Flora ==
322 species of plants can be found in the park, representing 4.6% of the total Paraguayan flora and 7.2% of the flora in the Oriental Region. Species include lapacho, cedro, laurel, incenso, and guajaivi. The national tree is the lapacho, which can reach 30 meters and features yellow or pink flowers. The incense has yellow flowers and a scent in the forest, as well as ferns and orchids.

== Population ==
The reserve is inhabited by Guaraní native families of the Mbya ethnic group. They dedicate to fishing, hunting and agriculture, mostly; they grow corn, manioc, lentils, beans and sweet potato.
