= Itapúa Poty =

- district
- Location within Paraguay
- Coordinates: 26°34′48″S 55°34′12″W
- Country: Paraguay
- Department: Itapúa Department
- Established: 6 August 1996

Population (2022)
  - Total: 9,273

Itapúa Poty is a Paraguayan district located in the north-central part of the Itapúa Department. It is situated approximately 25 km from route 6, which connects the cities of Encarnación and Ciudad del Este.

The town borders to the north with Tavaí (Caazapá Department), to the south with Capitán Meza and Pirapó, to the east with Edelira, and to the west with Alto Verá.

== History ==
Itapúa Poty was elevated to district status by Law No. 926 on 6 August 1996, which created the Municipality of Itapúa Poty within the Itapúa Department and established its municipal government in the town of the same name.

The district is named after the polka song "Itapúa Poty", composed by musician Juan Carlos Soria, a native of the community. Derived from the Guarani language, the name translates to "flower of Itapúa".

== Demographics ==
According to the 2022 Paraguayan census, Itapúa Poty has a total population of 9,273 with a median age of 28 years. The gender distribution is nearly equal, consisting of 4,719 men and 4,554 women. The district is overwhelmingly rural, with 8,409 residents living in rural areas compared to just 864 in urban centers.

The population breakdown by age and area is as follows:

- 0–14 years: 2,705 people (219 urban, 2,486 rural)
- 15–64 years: 5,759 people (557 urban, 5,202 rural)
- 65 years and older: 809 people (88 urban, 721 rural)

In the 2022 census, Itapúa Poty recorded 2,764 occupied private dwellings, with an average household size of 3.4 occupants. Public utility coverage and technological connectivity across households are distributed as follows:

- Electricity: 2,700 households
- Running water: 2,266 households
- Smartphones: 2,260 households
- Internet access: 1,813 households

== Tourism ==
The Takuapí waterfall is located in the forests of the district, within the San Rafael Reserve area. The waterfall is over 30 meters high and situated in a rugged landscape with abundant springs that forms part of the Tebicuary River basin. The area is suitable for eco-adventure activities and sports such as rappelling.
