= Tomás Romero =

Tomás Romero may refer to:

- Tomás Romero (revolutionary) (died 1848), Pueblo revolutionary during Mexican-American war
- Tomás Romero Pereira (1886–1982), 41st President of Paraguay
  - Tomás Romero Pereira, Paraguay, Paraguayan town named after the president
- Tomás Romero (footballer) (born 2000), Salvadoran footballer
