= Universidad Nacional de Itapúa =

Coordinates: 27.307163°S 55.887473°W

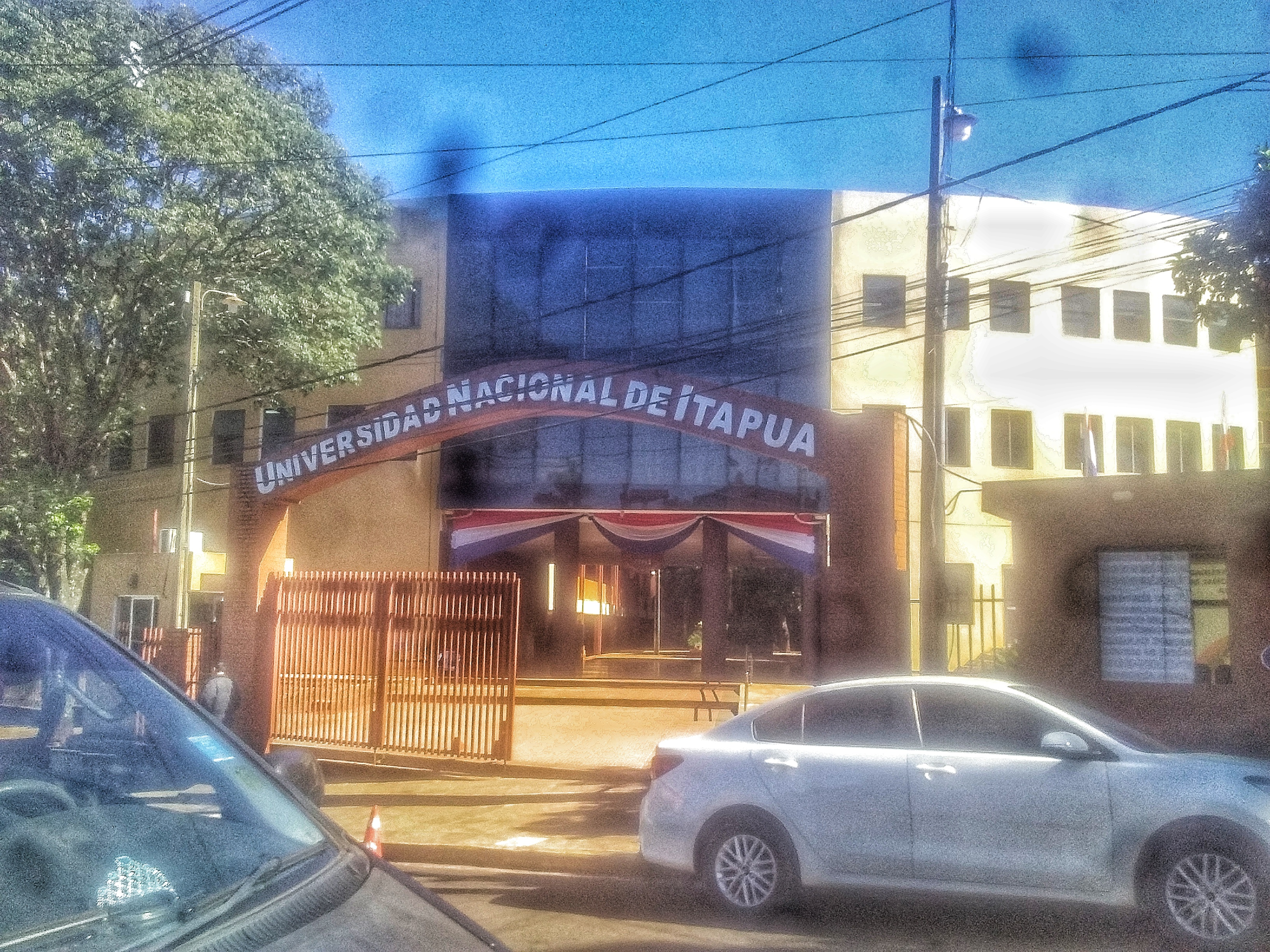
- Type: Public
- Established: December 3, 1996; 29 years ago
- Rector: Hermenegildo Cohene Velázquez
- Location: Encarnación, Itapúa, Paraguay
- Website: https://uni.edu.py

National University of Itapua (Acronym: UNI) is a Paraguayan national university with a range of degree offerings. UNI's campus is located on the Itapúa Department in the city of Encarnacion.

== History ==
The National University of Itapua was founded in 1996. Established by law No. 1009 dated on December 3, 1996. The proposal was submitted on March 25, 1995 to the Paraguayan Congress by Lorenzo Zacarías López who was the chair committee. On June 24, 1995 a Central Coordinating Committee was conformed by departmental representatives, local authorities, educators, politicians, businessmen and professionals from the city of Encarnacion. On November 7, 1996, the Board of Universities resolves the creation and the start up of UNI with the openings of two careers, Medicine and Electromechanical Engineering. In just over twenty years of existence, the University currently has more than six thousand students, and seven faculties, with various undergraduate and postgraduate courses, including master's degrees, doctorates, diplomas, specializations, scholarships, university residence, etc.; thus being one of the most important universities in the region.

== Academics ==
UNI is known for engineering, medicine, business, science and technology, environmental studies, humanities and social sciences. The university has seven faculties:

- The Faculty of Engineering has majors in Electromechanical Engineering, Civil Engineering, Industrial Engineering, and Engineering informatics.
- The Faculty of Medicine
- The Faculty of Humanities, Social Sciences and Guarani Culture
- The Faculty of Agricultural Science and Forestry
- The Faculty of Juridical Science
- The Faculty of Economic Science and administrative
- The Faculty of Science and Technology

== Logo ==
The authors of the logo are Rubén Sykora y Liliana Dreger de Sykora. All the elements used in the logo links to the Itapúa Department. The arc summarizes the Jesuit Reductions, with the characteristic colors of the stones in terracotta color, national pride and declared UNESCO World Heritage Site. A cross with the heart of the first Paraguayan saint, San Roque G. de Santa Cruz, projects from the top of the arc. Inside the arc, the great book of wisdom with a golden-yellow wheat spike which symbolizes the predominantly agricultural area. The text use a "giligans extrabold" font since it has a visual weight, strength and presence. The acronym "UNI" is located right at the bottom of the book.

== See also ==
- List of universities in Paraguay
