= Rubén Lezcano =

Paraguayan association football player (born 2004)

Personal information
- Full name: Rubén Dario Lezcano Portillo
- Date of birth: 9 February 2004 (age 22)
- Place of birth: Repatriación, Paraguay
- Height: 1.78 m (5 ft 10 in)
- Position: Midfielder

Team information
- Current team: Olimpia (on loan from Fluminense)
- Number: 19

Senior career*
Years	Team	Apps	(Gls)
2022-2025	Club Libertad	90	(18)
2025-	Fluminense	13	(1)
2026-	→ Olimpia (loan)	4	(3)
- * Club domestic league appearances and goals as of 22:03 (UTC) 9 March 2026

Rubén Dario Lezcano Portillo (born 9 February 2004) is a Paraguayan footballer who plays as an attacking midfielder for División de Honor club Olimpia, on loan from Fluminense.

== Club career ==
From Repatriación, he made his professional debut for Club Libertad in 2022. After scoring for Libertad in the 2023 Copa Paraguay against Club Sol de América he performed a celebration made known by Manchester United footballer Marcus Rashford and discussed after the game his admiration for the English forward. In 2024, he scored the winning goal for Libertad in the final of the 2024 Copa Paraguay.

=== Fluminense ===
On February 27, 2025, he reached an agreement to join Brazilian club Fluminense. The Tricolor paid US$ 5 million for 60% of the young player's rights.

== International career ==
In 2024, he was selected for the Paraguay U23 squad. He was selected for the Paraguay U23 squad for the 2024 Olympic Games.

== Style of play ==
An attacking midfielder, the strongest points in the game have been reported as dribbling and creating opportunities. He was included in the top ten under-21 players worldwide by the International Centre for Sports Studies in collaboration with Wyscout in December 2024.
