= Jesús, Paraguay =

Jesús
- district
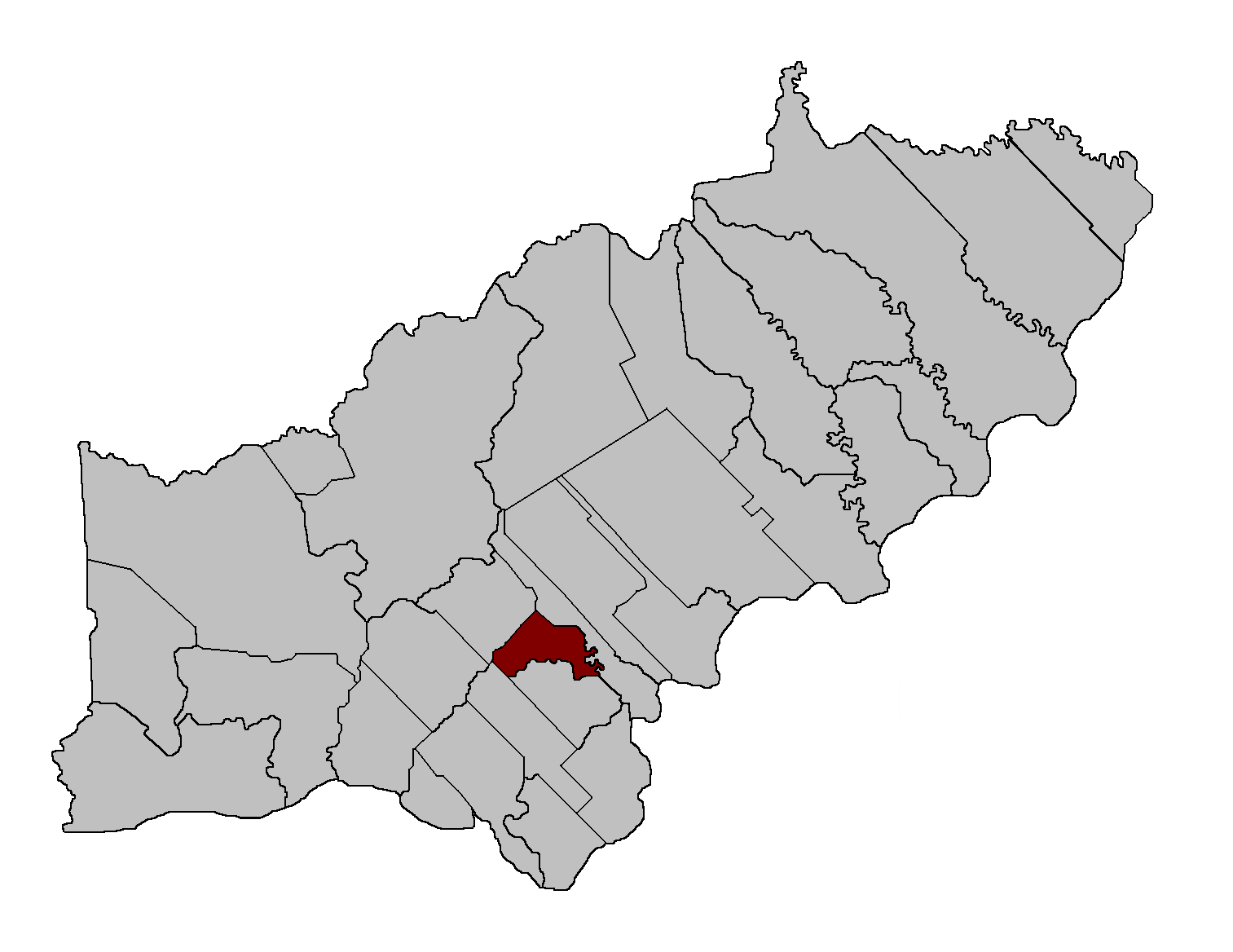

- Location within Paraguay
- Coordinates: 27°3′22″S 55°44′24″W
- Country: Paraguay
- Department: Itapúa Department

Population (2017)
  - Total: 6,363

Jesús is a district in the Itapúa Department of Paraguay. It is well known for its Jesuit Mission, the Ruins of Jesús de Tavarangue. In 1993, the mission was declared a UNESCO World Heritage Site, and is open to visitation by tourists.

== Location ==
Jesús is located 10 km from Ruta 6, 40 km north of the department’s capital, Encarnación, and is surrounded by the following districts:

- Hohenau to the east and north-east.
- La Paz to the west and north-west.
- Capitán Miranda to the west.
- Trinidad to the south.

== Population ==
According to the projection made by the Dirección General de Estadísticas, Encuestas y Censos, as of 2017 the district will have a total of 6,363 inhabitants.
