= Universidad Columbia del Paraguay =

Coordinates: 25.2859°S 57.6298°W

The Universidad Columbia del Paraguay (Columbia University of Paraguay) is a private university. It was founded in 1943 (82 years ago); it obtained the title of university in 1991 (34 years ago). In 60 years it had more than 200,000 students.

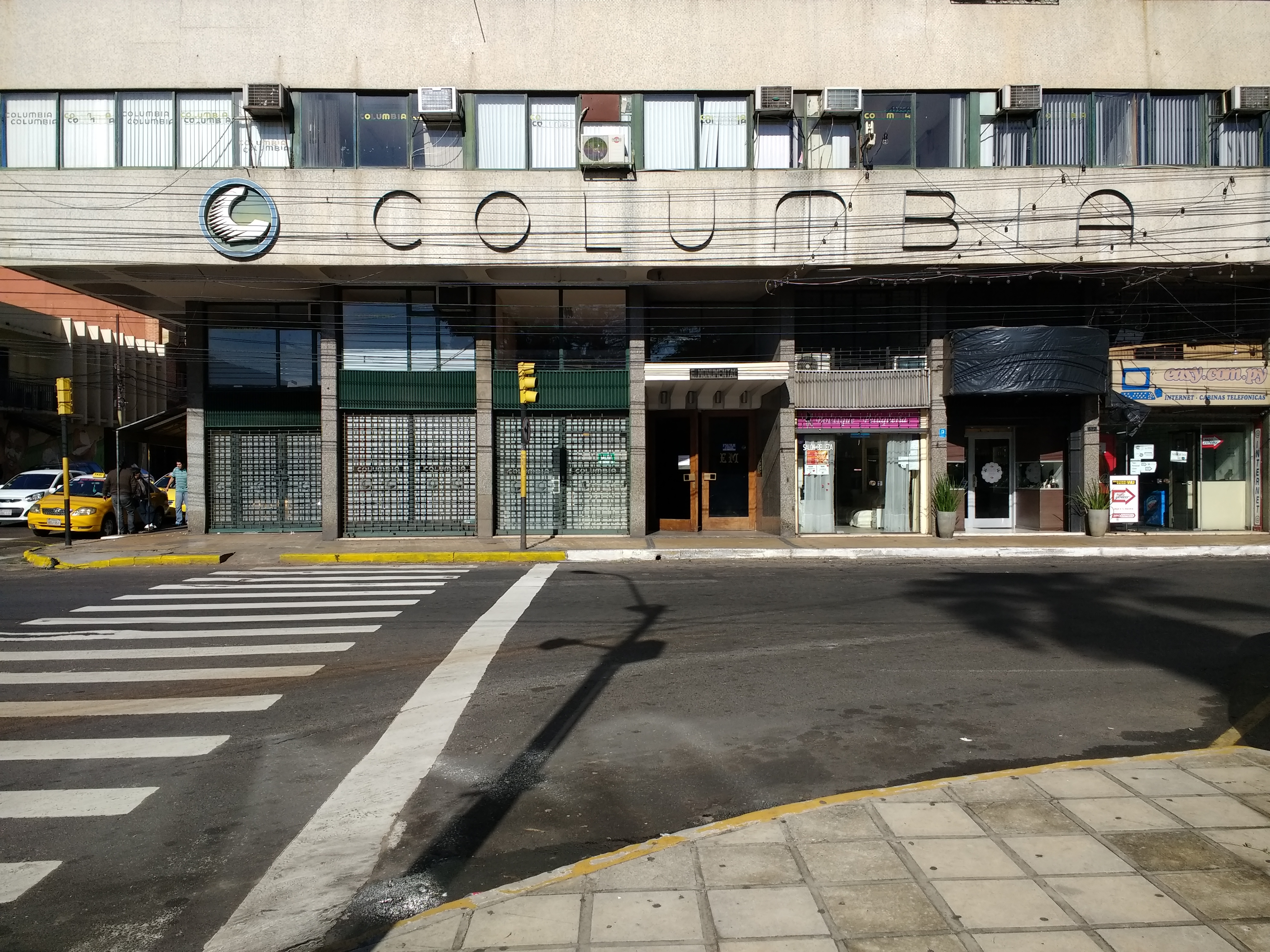
The Columbia University of Paraguay

== Degrees ==
These are the careers that UCP has:

- Accounting
- Agricultural Management
- Architecture
- Business Administration
- Commercial engineering
- Computer engineering
- Education
- Film Industry
- Fine arts
- Foreign Trade
- Hotel and Tourism
- Law
- Marketing
- Psychology
- Social Engineering
- Veterinary

== Campuses ==
- Asunción-25 de Mayo
- Asunción-España
- Pedro Juan Caballero
- San Lorenzo
