= Leandro Oviedo =

- district
- Location within Paraguay
- Coordinates: 26°43′12″S 56°13′48″W
- Country: Paraguay
- Department: Itapúa Department
- Elevation: 107 m (351 ft)

Population (2008)
  - Total: 327

Leandro Oviedo or José Leandro Oviedo is a district in the Itapúa Department of Paraguay.

== Sources ==
- World Gazeteer: Paraguay – World-Gazetteer.com
