= Yatytay =

- district
- Location within Paraguay
- Coordinates: 26°41′24″S 55°4′48″W
- Country: Paraguay
- Department: Itapúa Department

Area
  - Total: 226.3 km^{2} (87.4 sq mi)

Population (2022)
  - Total: 8,651
  - Density: 38.22/km^{2} (99.0/sq mi)

Yatytay (Guarani for snail water) is a district in the Itapúa Department of Paraguay. It is located in the southern part of the country, about 400 kilometers southeast of the national capital, Asunción and 120 kilometers northeast of the department capital, Encarnación. The district spans 299.9 square kilometers with its population reaching 8,651 residents as of the 2022 Paraguayan census. Originally developing as a timber transport stop along forest routes leading to the Paraná River, Yatytay experienced significant settlement beginning in the 1970s and was established as an independent district on 10 August 1987. The district is predominantly rural and is known for its annual Feast of Saint John celebrations.

== Geography and location ==
Yatytay is located in the southern part of Paraguay, in the Itapúa Department, about 400 kilometers southeast of the national capital, Asunción and 120 kilometers northeast of the department capital, Encarnación.

== Name ==
The meaning of Yatytay in the Guarani language is "snail water", represented at the entrance to the district by a large snail sculpture that welcomes visitors. Interestingly, the name is a palindrome, reading the same backwards as forwards.

== History ==
Yatytay originated as one of several stopping points along forest trails used to transport timber to the Paraná River for shipment to sawmills near Encarnación. Although a few homes existed in the area during the early 20th century, significant settlement began in the early 1970s with the arrival of colonists to lands that had previously been heavily forested. By 1979, the growing population led to the establishment of a neighborhood council and later a rural community under the jurisdiction of the district of Domingo Robledo (now known as Natalio). Yatytay was officially established as a separate district on 10 August 1987.

== Demographics ==
According to data from the General Directorate of Statistics of Paraguay, the population of Yatytay declined from 11,415 inhabitants recorded in the 2002 Paraguayan census to 8,651 inhabitants recorded in the 2022 Paraguayan census, representing a negative annual growth rate of -1.4% over the two decade period. Given the district's total land area of 226.3 square kilometers, the population density stands at 38.22 inhabitants per square kilometer.

The 2022 census data revealed a balanced gender distribution, consisting of 4,378 (50.6%) males and 4,273 (49.4%) females. In terms of age distribution, the district skews toward the young and middle-aged demographics. The largest segment of the population falls within the 15-64 age bracket, accounting for 5,494 individuals (63.5%). Children and adolescents aged 14 and under represent a quarter of the population at 2,165 individuals (25%), while the elderly population aged 65 and older forms the smallest part with 992 residents (11.5%).

Regarding the distribution of the population between rural areas and urban settings, Yatytay has a majority rural population with 5,408 residents (62.5%) residing in rural parts, while 3,243 people (37.5%) inhabit urban centers.

== Culture ==
The Feast of Saint John (Fiesta de San Juan), celebrated annually on 24 June, is an important cultural and religious event in Yatytay. During the festivities, residents prepare a wide variety of traditional Paraguayan dishes, including regional recipes that have become uncommon.
