= Universidad Nacional de Pilar =

Coordinates: 26.8532°S 58.3097°W

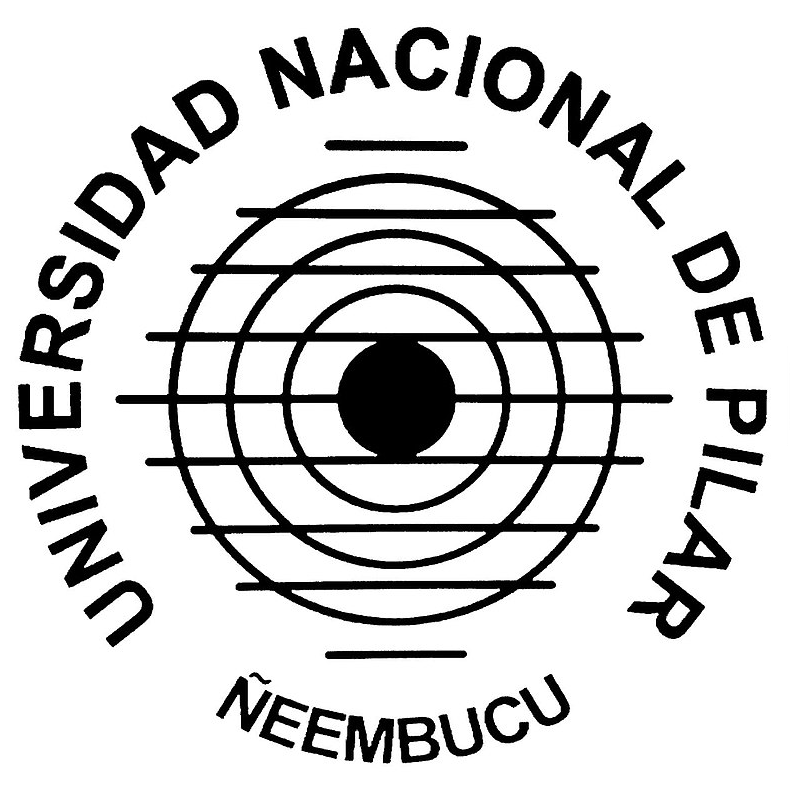
- Motto: Conocimiento en Acción desde el Sur
- Motto in English: Knowledge in Action from the South
- Type: Public
- Established: 14 July 1991; 34 years ago
- Rector: Víctor Ríos Ojeda
- Location: Pilar, Ñeembucú, Paraguay
- Website: www.unp.edu.py

The National University of Pilar (Acronym: UNP) is a Paraguayan national and public university with a range of degree offerings. The main campus is located in the capital of the Ñeembucú department, the city of Pilar. It was founded in 1991 and created by law in 1994.

== Branches ==
Apart from its main campus in Pilar, it operates in three cities of the neighbour Misiones Department: San Ignacio, San Juan Bautista and Ayolas. Also, in Asunción, a subsidiary operates in the premises of the Institute of Comparative Studies in Criminal and Social Sciences of Paraguay (INECIP-Py) thanks to an inter-institutional cooperation agreement.

== Academics ==
The university has seven faculties:

- Faculty of Agricultural Sciences and Rural Development
- Faculty of Applied Sciences
- Faculty of Accounting, Administrative and Economic Sciences
- Faculty of Law, Political and Social Sciences
- Faculty of Humanities and Education Sciences
- Faculty of Sciences, Technologies and Arts
- Faculty of Biomedical Sciences

== See also ==
- List of universities in Paraguay
