= General Isidoro Resquín =

- City and district
- Location within Paraguay
- Coordinates: 24°12′0″S 56°34′0″W
- Country: Paraguay
- Department: San Pedro
- Founded: 1981 by Presidente de la República "Gral. Alfredo Stroessner".

Government
  - Intendente Municipal: Lorenzo Correa Ojeda
- Elevation: 227 m (745 ft)

Population
  - Total: 24.543
  - Density: 57.48/km^{2} (148.9/sq mi)
- Time zone: -4 Gmt
- Postal code: 8490

General Isidoro Resquín is a city and district in the San Pedro department of Paraguay. Named after Francisco Isidoro Resquín it was established in 1981 by decision of Alfredo Stroessner.

It has about 22,350 inhabitants who engage in agriculture and trade in the capital of the department (San Pedro del Ycuamandyyú). It is separated from the Canindeyú, (formerly called Canendiyú) by the river Jejuí Guazú.

== Geography ==
Bordered on the north by the District Santa Rosa del Aguaray, it is separated by the river Aguaray Guazú.
To the south are districts: Guayaibí and Choré; two districts of the river separating the Jejui Guazú.
At the west lies the district of Lima (San Pedro).
By This is the XIV Canindeyú Department and XIII Department of Amambay.

=== Hydrography ===
Apart from the Paraguay River department's major rivers are tributaries of the same:

- Aguara Guazu
- Jejuì Guazú,.
- It has also streams Tajhekil, and the stream Cartei Cué which are tributaries of the river Aguara Guazu.

The district has the following ports: Puerto San Vincente and Puerto San Jose both on the river Jejuí Guazú.

=== Climate ===
It is wet and rainy; the relative humidity is 70 to 80%. The average temperature is 23 °C, the highest in summer (in January) is 35 °C and the minimum is 10 °C.

=== Roads ===
This district is accessible by Route 3 General Elizardo Aquino.

Its routes are without pavement, roads have all types of paving.
This district has public transport services with interdistrict services and newspapers until Asunción Ciudad del Este Pedro Juan Caballero Argentina, Brazil and Chile.

In terms of telephone communication, most services have dialups and now with satellite systems.

== Economy ==
Its soil is suitable for agriculture as for the livestock. The city is a major centre of activity that includes livestock production of cattle, horses, sheep and pigs.

In agriculture, the following crops are produced in the district: mate, cotton, snuff, sugarcane, cassava, sesame, Paraguayan cedar, soy, potato, alfalfa, citrus, peanuts, oranges, (sweet and sour), sunflower.

Despite being a department rich in agricultural production and especially cattle, the dominant feature of it is the marked deficiency in terms of infrastructure and human development.

Much of the district's population, or 69.4% is poor and although the rest of the population is not considered poor, the gaps are very marked, the average monthly income per family corresponds to the sum of only 409,151 Guarani, which represents an income per person monthly average of 78,764 Guarani. The population of the District of General Isidoro Resquín also engages in commercial river fishing.

== Education ==
The educational level of the vast majority of the employed population (more than two-thirds) is very low, less than the first six years of basic instruction. The working population of the department itself lacks a reasonable level of qualification, which conspires against the development of the area.

The illiteracy, due to extreme poverty, which makes it difficult to send their children to school, particularly affects women.

The indigenous bias also has access to primary education, albeit with little notice.

In the area the town has Mennonite schools Jesuit and Dominican.

For the tertiary level and / or University, it has a specialized school, which is the " St. Vincent Agricultural School "

== Language ==
Predominant language Guarani that approximately 80% of the people speak, and the Spanish-Guarani (yoparà) is spoken by 20% of the remaining population.

== Demographics ==
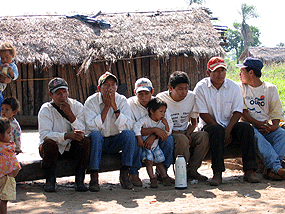
Community indigenous

The General District Resquín, has a total population of 22,350 inhabitants in the urban area is the amount of 1,936 inhabitants, and in the area Rural is 24,543 inhabitants.

Its rural population is 91.33% of the total population.

The total households in the district amounts to the amount of 4,046, of which corresponds to households in urban areas the number of 407, and in rural areas the number of 3,639 households, representing 89.94% of the households are living in rural areas.

As for the main socio-demographic indicators, General Resquín district, we have the following details:

- Population less than 15 years 48.2%.
- Average of 3.6 children per woman.
- Illiterate 9.4%.
- Employed by the primary sector 77.7%.
- Employed by the secondary sector 5.4%.
- Employed in the tertiary sector 16.6%.
- Occupied work in the agricultural 76.8%.
- Homes with electricity 75.1%.
- Homes with running water 55.3%.

=== Indigenous communities ===
Within indigenous communities that exist in the district include the following:

- Santa Carolina (Yvy Ju).
- Ka´a Poty - San Vicente.
- Naranjito - San Vicente.
- Tahekyi – San Luis.
- Yvoty Hu.

== Bibliography ==
- Fascicules Journal of Ultima Hora "Paraguay Tourist"
- Fascicles of the Journal News "Che Retà Paraguay"

== Sources ==
- World Gazeteer: Paraguay – World-Gazetteer.com
