= General Delgado =

- district
- Location within Paraguay
- Coordinates: 27°5′24″S 56°31′12″W
- Country: Paraguay
- Department: Itapúa Department

Population (2008)
  - Total: 1 706

General Delgado is a district in Itapúa Department of Paraguay.

== Sources ==
- World Gazeteer: Paraguay – World-Gazetteer.com
