= Carlos Antonio López, Paraguay =

Carlos Antonio López
- district
- Location within Paraguay
- Coordinates: 26°23′59″S 54°45′36″W
- Country: Paraguay
- Department: Itapúa Department
- Established: 6 August 1996

Area
  - Total: 1,620 km^{2} (630 sq mi)
- Elevation: 222 m (728 ft)

Population (2017)
  - Total: 19,783

Carlos Antonio López is a district in the Itapúa Department of Paraguay.
