= Tembiaporá =

Coordinates: 25°20′S 55°23′W

- District
- Location within Paraguay
- Country: Paraguay
- Department: Caaguazú
- Time zone: UTC−4
  - Summer (DST): UTC−3

Tembiaporá (Guarani: Tembiaporã) is a district in the department of Caaguazú, Paraguay.
