= Mayor Otaño =

- Town and district
- Location within Paraguay
- Coordinates: 26°24′0″S 54°42′36″W
- Country: Paraguay
- Department: Itapúa Department

Population (2008)
  - Total: 5 564

Mayor Otaño or Mayor Julio D. Otaño is a town and district in the Itapúa Department of Paraguay.

== Sources ==
- World Gazeteer: Paraguay – World-Gazetteer.com
