= Mbutuy =

- Location within Paraguay
- Coordinates: 24°58′30″S 56°18′36″W
- Country: Paraguay
- Department: Caaguazú

Population (2008)
  - Total: 1 522

Santa Rosa del Mbutuy is a town and district in the Caaguazú department of Paraguay that is best described as the 'Cruce del Mbutuy' by residents of the Santa Rosa District, where it is located, because of the intersection of two major roads that the town is built around.

Some of the town's early growth could be attributed to the fact that it was on an asphalt paved road that intersected with a dirt road to the rest of the District of Santa Rosa del Mbutuy, and other departments of the nation.

== Economy ==
Much of the town's economy is derived from traveler services such as food and fuel to those that pass through, as well as services to the local agricultural sector.

== Communication ==
Before cellular phone services where available in the area, it was home to one of the two telephone exchanges in the district.

== Location ==
It is located about 3.5 hours by bus north-east of Asunción, the capital city of the country.

== Sources ==
- World Gazeteer: Paraguay – World-Gazetteer.com
