= Choré District =

Coordinates: 24.2°S 56.5667°W

Choré District Distrito de Choré (Spanish) Táva Chore (Guarani)
- District
- Interactive map of Choré District
- Country: Paraguay
- Department: San Pedro Department

Area
  - Water: 703 km^{2} (271 sq mi)

Population (2022)
  - Total: 23,548

Choré District (Guarani: Chore) is a district of the San Pedro Department, Paraguay. It occupies an area of 703 km^{2} (271 sq mi). As per the 2022 census, it had a population of 23,548 individuals. The district was officially established on 11 December 1981.

== History ==
The original occupants of the regions were the indigenous Guaraní people. The name Choré came from the tribal chieftain of the indigenous people known as Juan Choré, whose name itself was derived from the name of a wild bird known as "Guyraû Choré".

The region was earlier part of the San Estanislao district. Following petitions by the locals for the creation of an independent district, the Choré district was officially established on 11 December 1981.

== Geography ==
Choré is a district located in the San Pedro Department in Paraguay. It occupies an area of 703 km^{2} (271 sq mi). It is located about 230 km (140 mi) from the Paraguayan capital of Asunción, and separated from the districts of Lima and General Isidoro Resquín to the north by the Jejuí River. It borders the districts of General Elizardo Aquino and San Estanislao to the south, and Guayaibí to the west.

It has humid climate with heavy rainfall throughout the year. The average annual temperature is 23 °C (73 °F), with a maximum of 40 °C (104 °F) and a minimum of 1 °C (34 °F).

== Demographics and economy ==
As per the 2022 census, Choré had a population of 23,548 inhabitants of which 11,957 were males and 11,591 were females. About 85.9% of the population was classified rural, and the rest (14.1%) lived in urban areas. About 28.4% of the population was below the age of fourteen, and 9.3% was more than 65 years of age.

The economy is dependent on agriculture majorly tobacco, and livestock rearing. Limited fishing is practiced by the people, who reside on the banks of the Jejui River. Club Choré Central is a football club based out of Choré and plays in the Paraguayan Primera División B Nacional.
