= San Rafael del Paraná =

- District
- Interactive map of San Rafael del Paraná
- Coordinates: 26°39′0″S 54°55′48″W
- Country: Paraguay
- Department: Itapúa Department

Population (2008)
  - Total: 510

San Rafael del Paraná is a district in the Itapúa Department of Paraguay.

== Sources ==
- World Gazeteer: Paraguay – World-Gazetteer.com
