= Nueva Alborada =

- District
- Location within Paraguay
- Coordinates: 27°15′0″S 55°37′12″W
- Country: Paraguay
- Department: Itapúa Department

Population (2008)
  - Total: 320

Nueva Alborada is a district in the Itapúa Department of Paraguay.

== Sources ==
- World Gazeteer: Paraguay – World-Gazetteer.com
