= La Paz, Paraguay =

La Paz
- district
- Location within Paraguay
- Coordinates: 26°59′30″S 55°33′31″W
- Country: Paraguay
- Department: Itapúa Department
- Established: 6 August 1996

Area
  - Total: 256 km^{2} (99 sq mi)
- Elevation: 240 m (790 ft)

Population (2017)
  - Total: 3,333

La Paz is a district in the Itapúa Department of Paraguay.
