= Pirapó, Paraguay =

Pirapó
- district
- Location within Paraguay
- Coordinates: 26°51′36″S 55°32′42″W
- Country: Paraguay
- Department: Itapúa Department

Area
  - Total: 840 km^{2} (320 sq mi)
- Elevation: 122 m (400 ft)

Population (2017)
  - Total: 9,069

Pirapó is a district in the Itapúa Department of Paraguay.
