= Loreto, Paraguay =

Coordinates: 23°16′S 57°19′W

Loreto
- District
- Location within Paraguay
- Country: Paraguay
- Department: Concepción

Population
  - Total: 18,419
- Time zone: -4 Gmt

Loreto is a district in the department of Concepción, Paraguay. Its population was estimated in 2015 to be 18,419.
