= Regimiento de Infantería Tres Corrales =

Tres Corrales
- Location within Paraguay
- Coordinates: 25.3400°S 56.1917°W
- Country: Paraguay
- Department: Caaguazú

Population (2002)
  - Total: 7,666

Tres Corrales is a village and district in the Caaguazú department of Paraguay.

== Sources ==
- World Gazeteer: Paraguay – World-Gazetteer.com
