= San Cristóbal District, Paraguay =

Coordinates: 25°53′S 55°28′W

San Cristobal District
- District
- Interactive map of San Cristobal District
- Country: Paraguay
- Department: Alto Paraná

Area
  - Land: 926.8 km^{2} (357.8 sq mi)

Population (2022)
  - Total: 8,563
  - Density: 9.239/km^{2} (23.93/sq mi)

San Cristóbal is a district of the Alto Paraná Department, Paraguay. It occupies an area of 926.8 km^{2} (357.8 sq mi) and is one of the most isolated districts in the department. As per the 2022 census, it had a population of 8,563 individuals.

== Geography ==
San Cristóbal is a district located in the Alto Paraná Department in Paraguay. It occupies an area of 926.8 km^{2} (357.8 sq mi). It is located in a remote and isolated location in southern part of the department.

It is located at an elevation of 282.62 m (927.2 ft) above sea level. The district has a tropical savanna climate (Köppen climate classification: Aw). The average annual temperature is 24.11 °C (75.40 °F). The district receives an average annual rainfall of 15.18 cm (5.98 in) and has 143.25 rainy days in a year.

== Infrastructure and services ==
San Cristóbal is characterized by deficient public infrastructure and other services including proper road connections, and healthcare facilities. Due to this isolation, residents and local businesses have often been forced to self-organize support systems, including voluntary monthly contributions to help maintain public operations such as policing due to limited state allocation.

== Demographics ==
As per the 2022 census, San Cristóbal district had a population of 8,563 inhabitants of which 4,433 were males and 4,130 were females. About 82.7% of the population was classified rural, and the rest (17.3%) lived in urban areas. About 28.6% of the population was below the age of fourteen, and 5.7% was more than 65 years of age. The economy is dependent on agriculture particularly wheat production.
