= Yby Yaú =

Yby Yaú Yby Ja'u (Guarani)
- City and district
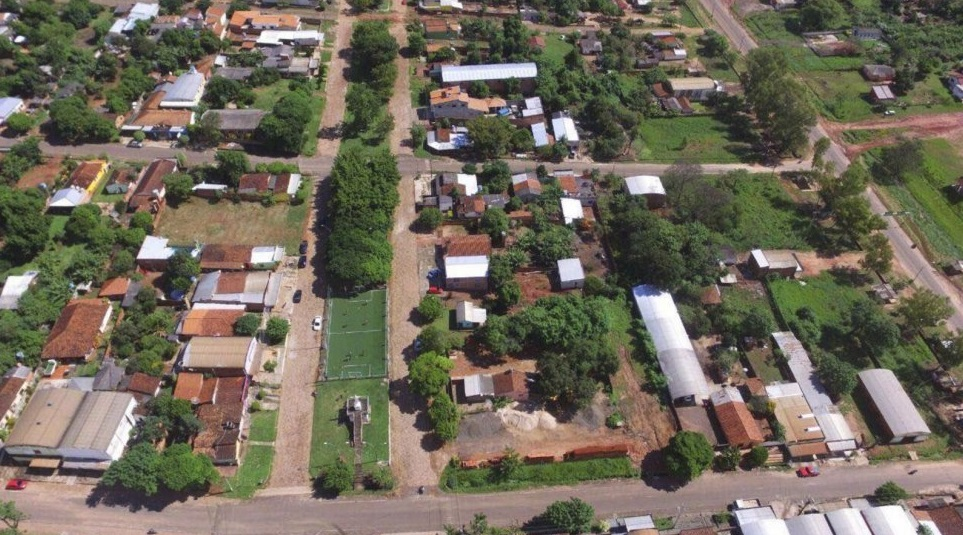
- Aerial view of Yby Yaú, Paraguay

- Location within Paraguay
- Coordinates: 22°57′47″S 56°32′09″W
- Country: Paraguay
- Department: Concepción
- Foundation: 20 December 1984

Area
  - Total: 2,420 km^{2} (930 sq mi)
- Elevation: 163 m (535 ft)

Population
  - Total: 31,290
- Time zone: -4 Gmt
- Postal code: 8900
- Area code: 595 39
- Climate: Aw

Yby Yaú (Guarani: Yvy Ja'u) is a district and city located in the department of Concepción of Paraguay.
