= San Alberto, Paraguay =

San Alberto
- City
- Location within Paraguay
- Coordinates: 24°58′12″S 54°54′0″W
- Country: Paraguay
- Department: Alto Paraná

Population (2008)
  - Total: 6 242

San Alberto is a city in the Alto Paraná department of Paraguay. It is one of the districts of Northern Alto Paraná and is located about 439 km. from the capital Asunción.

San Alberto has seen a rapid development and today is the main city in Northern Alto Paraná.

The city was founded by Alberto Fernández Valenzuela (1906-2005), a captain of the Paraguayan navy, who was president of the Empresa Colonizadora Industrial Mbaracayu S.A. (Industrial Colonizing Company Mbaracayu S.A.), initially was known as Gleba 6 and belonged to the district of Hernandarias.

The inhabitants are mostly of Brazilian origin.

Agriculture is the main source of economic income of the district.

== Sources ==
- World Gazeteer: Paraguay – World-Gazetteer.com
