= Raúl Arsenio Oviedo =

- Location within Paraguay
- Coordinates: 25°11′22.15″S 55°36′0.94″W
- Country: Paraguay
- Department: Caaguazú

Population (2008)
  - Total: 1 616

Raúl Arsenio Oviedo is a town in the Caaguazú department of Paraguay.

== Sources ==
- World Gazeteer: Paraguay – World-Gazetteer.com
