= Vaquería =

- Location within Paraguay
- Coordinates: 25°1′12″S 55°49′48″W
- Country: Paraguay
- Department: Caaguazú

Population (2008)
  - Total: 3 153

Vaquería is a town in the Caaguazú department of Paraguay.

== Sources ==
- World Gazeteer: Paraguay – World-Gazetteer.com
