= General Artigas =

- district
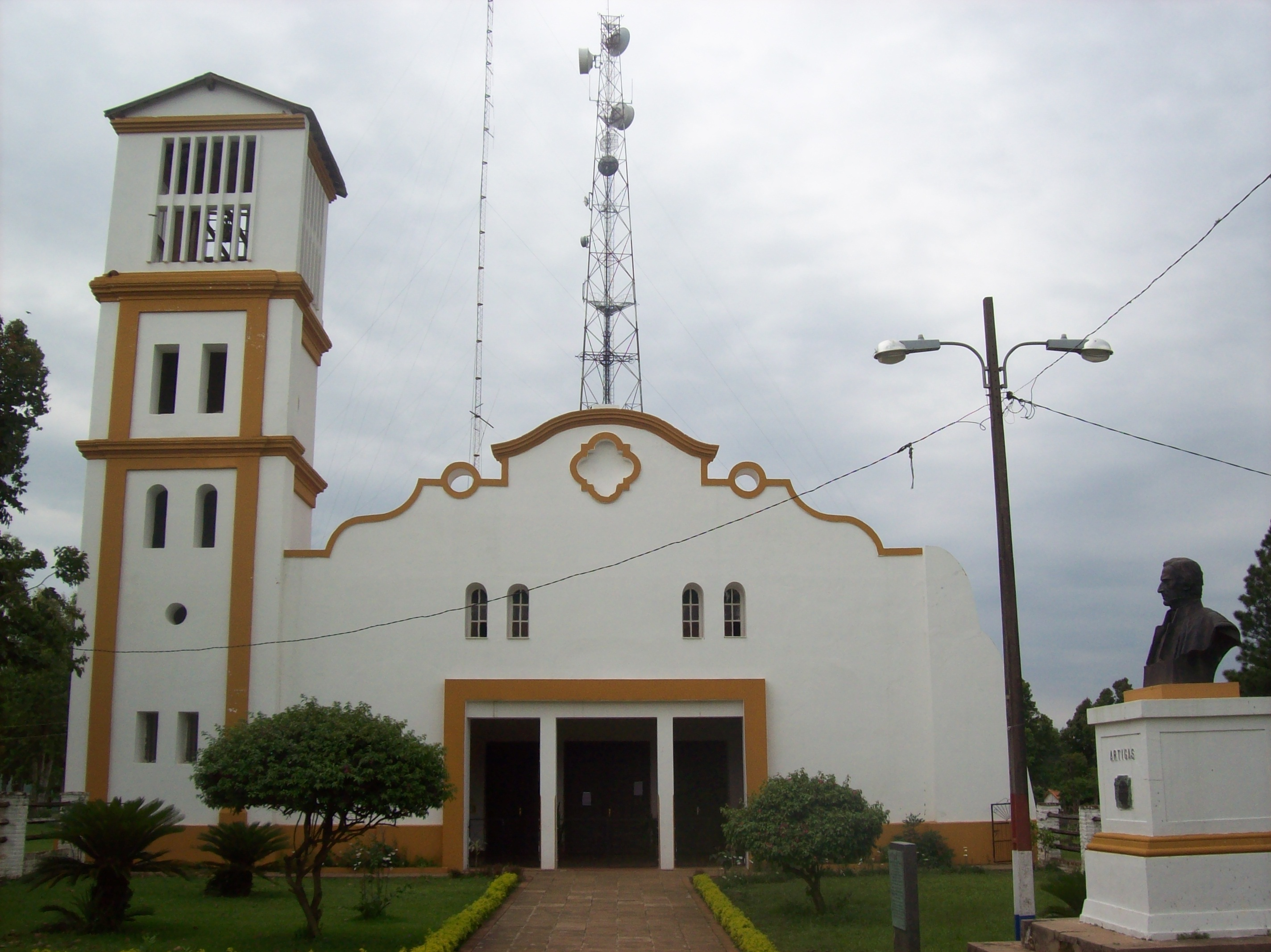
- General Artigas, Paraguay

- Location within Paraguay
- Coordinates: 26°56′24″S 56°13′12″W
- Country: Paraguay
- Department: Itapúa Department

Population (2008)
  - Total: 4 435

General Artigas is a town in the Itapúa Department of Paraguay.

It is named after the Uruguayan national hero, José Gervasio Artigas, who spent his last 30 years exiled in Paraguay (1820-1850).

== Sister cities ==
General Artigas is twinned with:

- Fray Bentos, Uruguay

== Sources ==
- World Gazeteer: Paraguay – World-Gazetteer.com
