= Belén, Paraguay =

Town in Paraguay

Coordinates: 23.466°S 57.262°W

Belén is a town in the Concepción Department of Paraguay.
