= Teniente Primero Manuel Irala Fernández =

- District
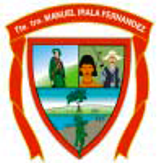

- Location in Paraguay
- Coordinates: 22.814°S 59.586°W
- Country: Paraguay
- Department: Presidente Hayes
- Founded: 16 June 1979
- District status: 2 March 2006

Government
  - Intendente Municipal: El Monchi Papá (Guasú Front)

Area
  - Total: 13,278 km^{2} (5,127 sq mi)

Population (2017)
  - Total: 25,890
- Time zone: -4 Gmt
- Climate: Cfa

Teniente Primero Manuel Irala Fernández is a district and locality in the Presidente Hayes Department of Paraguay. It is located 580 km from Asunción and has a population of 25,890 inhabitants. It was established as a category by means of law 3000/06.

"The District of First Lieutenant Manuel Irala Fernández, or also called" Irala Fernández ", was created in 2006 and has that name in honor Manuel Irala Fernández, nicknamed" Yacaré Valija "who was a great fighter of great prominence in the War of the Chaco for his patrols and infiltrations in enemy lines, he had previously participated in the revolution of 1922, where after an anecdote comes his nickname.

The district was previously known as 25 Leguas and belonged to Villa Hayes, until it was disaffected in the aforementioned year. It is one of the richest and richest districts of the Chaco in terms of its nature as well as in the number of forts and historical sites of the War that are within its more than 13,000 km² of surface.

Being a "new" district, its urban center does not offer the common style of the cities because it is surrounded by estancias and only Ruta 9 becomes practically its only means of communication. However, two urban centers near the municipality are the most important in the aforementioned city, such as San Eugenio and La Piedad.

In Irala Fernández one can enjoy the aquatic complex of the salt lakes, located approximately 50 km from the urban center. This complex is a natural refuge for birds of many species and is characterized by the fact that during the months of July, August and September, the southern pink flamingos migrate from Bolivia to continue their journey to Chile. "

- See more at: http://www.bienvenidoaparaguay.com/ciudades.php?xmlcity=228&xmldepto=16#sthash.TSLvqGgj.dpuf
