= Capitán Meza =

- district
- Location within Paraguay
- Coordinates: 27°1′12″S 55°34′12″W
- Country: Paraguay
- Department: Itapúa Department

Population (2008)
  - Total: 1 192

Capitán Meza is a town in the Itapúa Department of Paraguay.

== Climate ==
Climate data for Capitán Meza (1991–2020)
Month	Jan	Feb	Mar	Apr	May	Jun	Jul	Aug	Sep	Oct	Nov	Dec	Year
Mean daily maximum °C (°F)	31.8 (89.2)	31.2 (88.2)	30.4 (86.7)	27.7 (81.9)	23.5 (74.3)	21.8 (71.2)	21.6 (70.9)	24.1 (75.4)	25.7 (78.3)	28.3 (82.9)	29.7 (85.5)	31.2 (88.2)	27.3 (81.1)
Daily mean °C (°F)	25.4 (77.7)	24.7 (76.5)	23.8 (74.8)	21.1 (70.0)	17.4 (63.3)	16.0 (60.8)	15.2 (59.4)	17.1 (62.8)	18.9 (66.0)	21.6 (70.9)	23.0 (73.4)	24.7 (76.5)	20.7 (69.3)
Mean daily minimum °C (°F)	20.5 (68.9)	20.1 (68.2)	18.9 (66.0)	16.4 (61.5)	12.9 (55.2)	11.4 (52.5)	10.0 (50.0)	11.7 (53.1)	13.7 (56.7)	16.5 (61.7)	17.6 (63.7)	19.6 (67.3)	15.8 (60.4)
Average precipitation mm (inches)	153.7 (6.05)	142.2 (5.60)	132.0 (5.20)	181.3 (7.14)	148.2 (5.83)	121.4 (4.78)	99.3 (3.91)	79.4 (3.13)	123.6 (4.87)	218.6 (8.61)	187.8 (7.39)	199.0 (7.83)	1,786.4 (70.33)
Source: NOAA

== Sources ==
- World Gazeteer: Paraguay – World-Gazetteer.com
