= Itapúa Department =

Department of Paraguay

Itapúa Departamento de Itapúa (Spanish) Tetãvore Itapúa (Guarani)
- Department
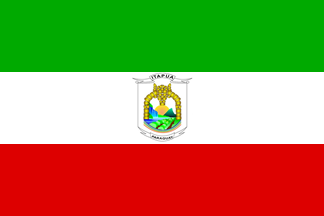
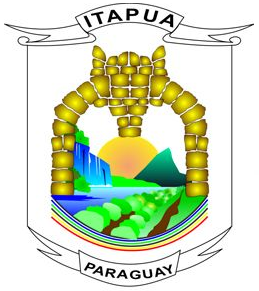
- Flag Coat of arms

- Coordinates: 27°20′S 55°53′W
- Country: Paraguay
- Established: 1906
- Capital: Encarnación

Government
  - Governor: Javier Pereira (PLRA)

Area
  - Total: 16,525 km^{2} (6,380 sq mi)

Population (2022 census)
  - Total: 449,642
  - Density: 27.210/km^{2} (70.473/sq mi)
- Time zone: UTC-04 (AST)
  - Summer (DST): UTC-03 (ADT)
- ISO 3166 code: PY-7
- Number of Districts: 30
- Website: http://www.itapua.gov.py

Itapúa (Spanish pronunciation: [itaˈpu.a]) is a department in the southern region of Paraguay. The capital is the city of Encarnación. It is divided into 30 districts, more than any other department in the country.

== History ==
The department was created after the breakup of the Misiones Department, with the city of Encarnación as the capital. It had high economic growth in the first 30 years of the arrival of immigrants and the Carlos Antonio Lopez Railway; the growth was accompanied by several ups and downs.

An era of decline followed until the 1950s when the Carnaval Encarnaceno became better known and attracted tourists from various regions. In the 1980s the department became more industrial, but modestly so compared with other departments like the Central Department.

In 1989, the Yacyretá Dam displaced the people living in the Yacyretá Reservoir; the displacement still continues. The San Roque González de Santa Cruz Bridge was inaugurated in 1991, connecting not only the city of Encarnación and Posadas, but also Paraguay with Argentina.

== Toponymy ==
The name is in Guaraní and refers to the place where Encarnación, the current capital city, was founded. The site was known as "itá" (rock, stone) and "púa" (tip); hence the name means "Tip of the Stone".

== Demographics ==
According to the 2002 National Census, Itapúa has a total population of 453,692 inhabitants, making it the third-most populated department of the country after Central and Alto Paraná. 8.9% of Paraguay's total population lives in this department.

=== Cultural diversity ===
Much of the Itapúa region was colonized by immigrants from different origins, among them the Italians, Germans, Ukrainians, French, Japanese, Poles, and also immigrants from Syria and Lebanon in more recent times. Because of this cultural diversity Itapúa was given the name "Melting pot", making it the most cosmopolitan department of Paraguay.

In the beginning, the first major economic activity of the immigrants was the exploitation of natural resources, especially timber, in the Alto Paraná and San Rafael Hills (now a national park). Nowadays, residents are engaged in several thriving industries, including agriculture (soybean, tung, corn, etc.) and livestock.

== Geography ==
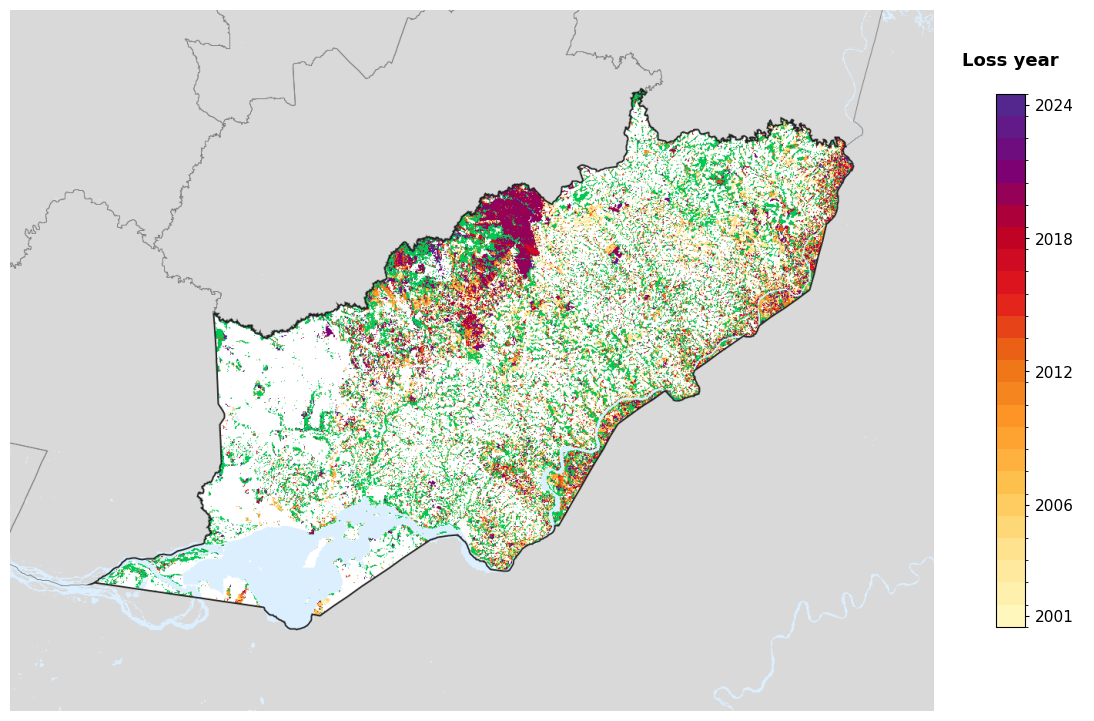
Tree-cover loss year in Itapúa, 2001-2024, from the Global Forest Change dataset.

=== Location ===
This department is located southeast of the Eastern Region of Paraguay.

=== Limits ===
- North: the departments of Alto Paraná and Caazapá.
- South: with Argentina (Provinces of Misiones and Corrientes). Separated by the Paraná River.
- East: the Argentine Republic (Misiones Province).
- West: with the Misiones Department.

=== Climate ===
The climate is humid subtropical with a tendency for low temperatures, the annual average is 15 °C, with a maximum of 40 °C and a minimum of -3 °C. Rainfall is abundant, with an annual average of nearly 1,700 mm, recorded throughout most of the year except in July and August.

== Administrative division ==
The department is divided into the following 30 districts:

District	Population (2002)	District	Population (2002)	District	Population (2002)
1 Alto Verá	13,799	11 Fram	6,923	21 Nueva Alborada	9,193
2 Bella Vista	9,193	12 General Artigas	11,042	22 Obligado	11,441
3 Cambyretá	9,193	13 General Delgado	6,611	23 Pirapó	6,754
4 Capitán Meza	9,193	14 Hohenau	9,685	24 San Cosme y Damián	7,322
5 Capitán Miranda	9,193	15 Itapúa Poty	14,642	25 San Juan del Paraná	7,091
6 Carlos Antonio López	17,622	16 Jesús	5,560	26 San Pedro del Paraná	28,598
7 Carmen del Paraná	9,193	17 La Paz	3,076	27 San Rafael del Paraná	20,434
8 Coronel Bogado	17,065	18 Leandro Oviedo	4,353	28 Tomás Romero Pereira	27,239
9 Edelira	22,287	19 Mayor Otaño	12,157	29 Trinidad	6,873
10 Encarnación	93,497	20 Natalio	19,456	30 Yatytay	11,415

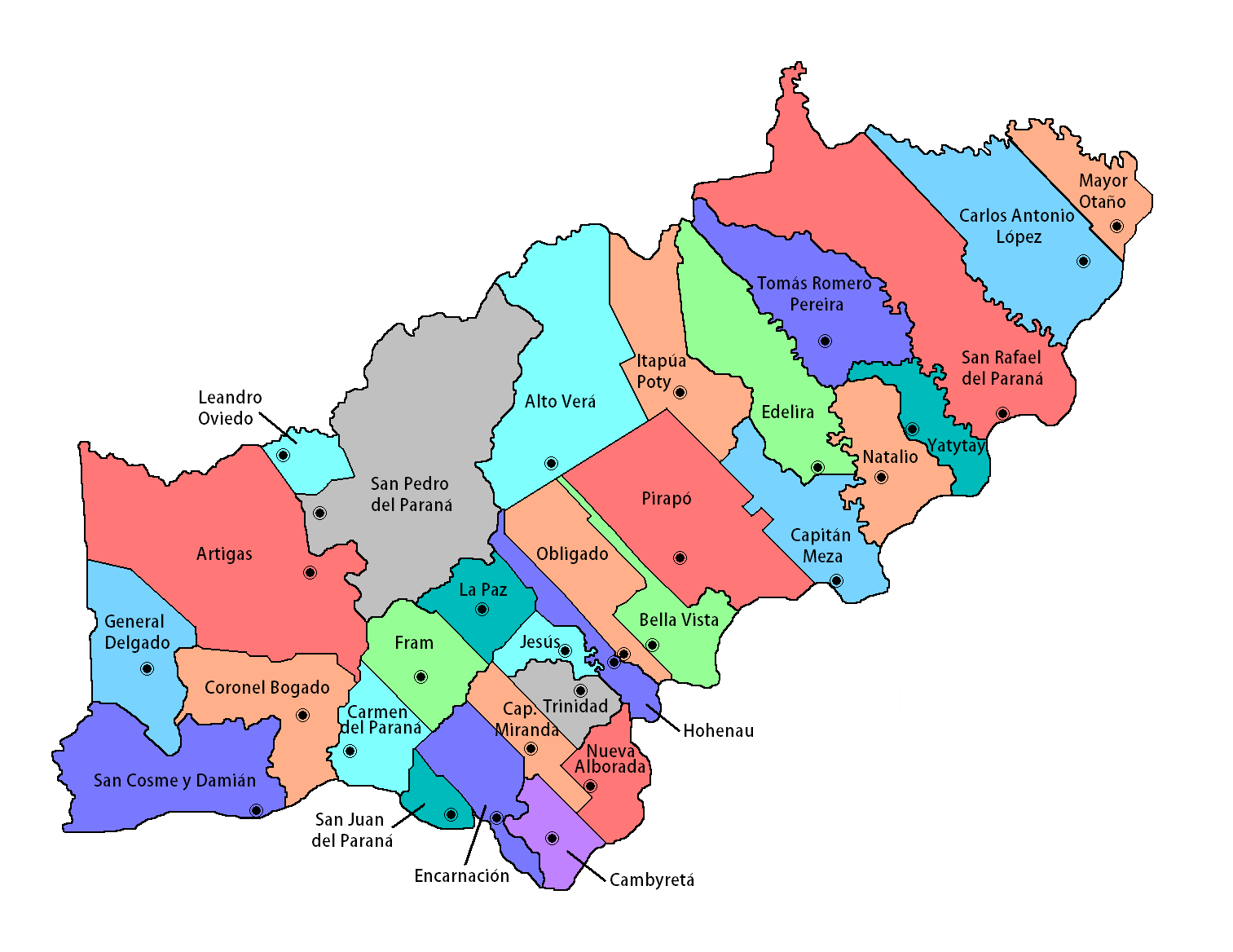

== See also ==
- List of high schools in Itapúa
