= Natalio =

- District
- Location within Paraguay
- Coordinates: 26°43′12″S 55°4′48″W
- Country: Paraguay
- Department: Itapúa Department
- Natalio: 1974

Government
  - Municipal Intendent: Marco Maidana Ojeda

Area
  - Total: 386 km^{2} (149 sq mi)

Population (2002)
  - Total: 19,456
- Time zone: UTC−04:00

Natalio is a district in the Itapúa Department of Paraguay. It is located in the South-East of the country, with the town center located just 10 km from the Paraná River and the border with Argentina. The district lies 45 km off Route 6 which connects departmental capitals Encarnación and Ciudad del Este. The town is located in a fertile agricultural region. Local crops are soy, corn, wheat, tung, sorghum, and cotton. Natalio's slogan is "the Capital of Soy".

== Sources ==
- World Gazeteer: Paraguay – World-Gazetteer.com
