= Juan Emilio O'Leary =

Juan Emiliano O'Leary
- Location within Paraguay
- Coordinates: 25°25′12″S 55°23′24″W
- Country: Paraguay
- Department: Alto Paraná Department

Population (2008)
  - Total: 3 214
- Climate: Cfa

Juan Emilio O'Leary is a town in the Alto Paraná Department of Paraguay.

== Sources ==
- World Gazeteer: Paraguay – World-Gazetteer.com
