= Repatriación =

- Town
- Location within Paraguay
- Coordinates: 25°31′48″S 55°57′0″W
- Country: Paraguay
- Department: Caaguazú

Population (2008)
  - Total: 9 774

Repatriación is a town in the Caaguazú department of Paraguay.

== Sources ==
- World Gazeteer: Paraguay – World-Gazetteer.com

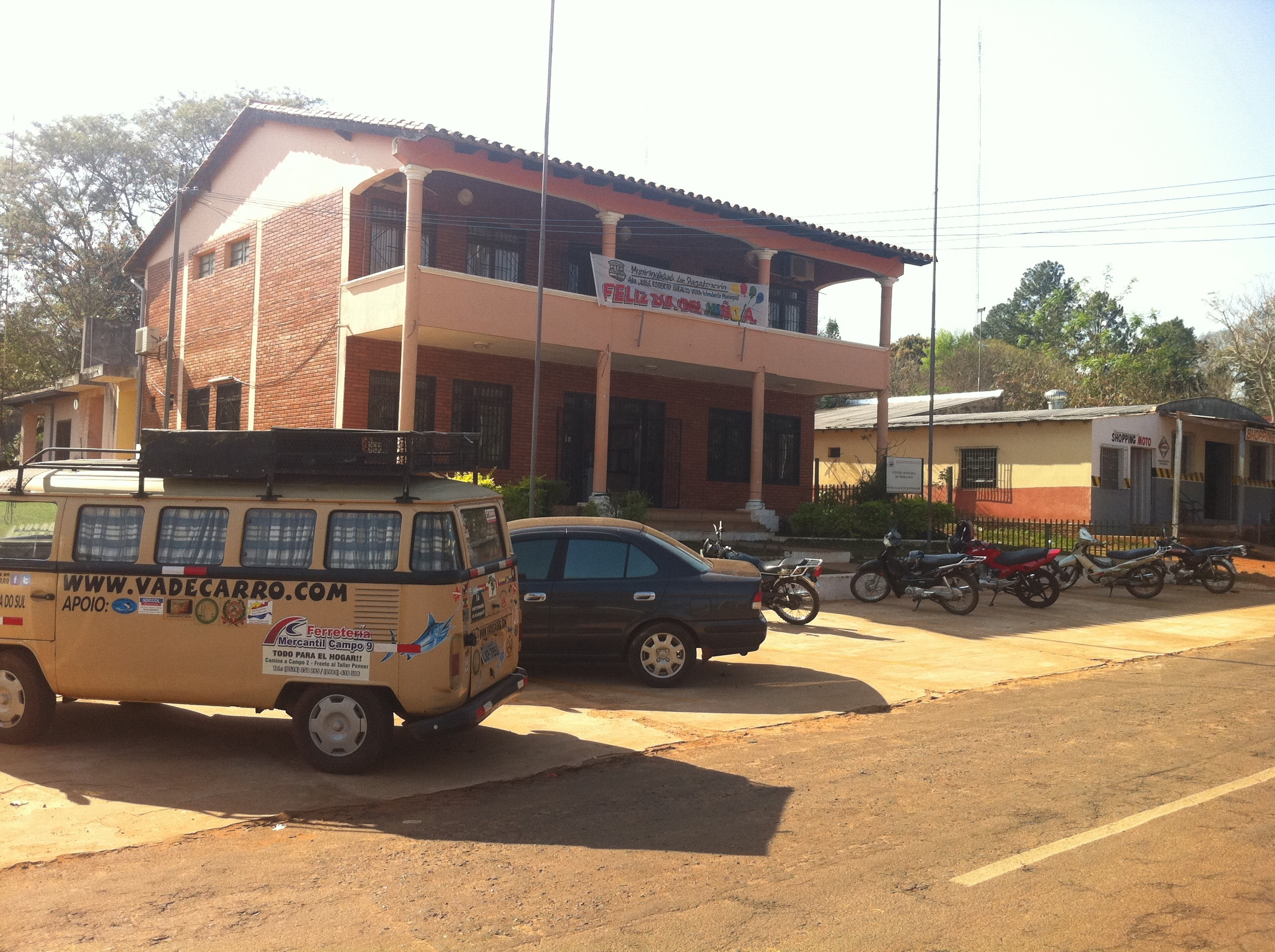
Repatriación town hall
