= Alto Verá =

- District
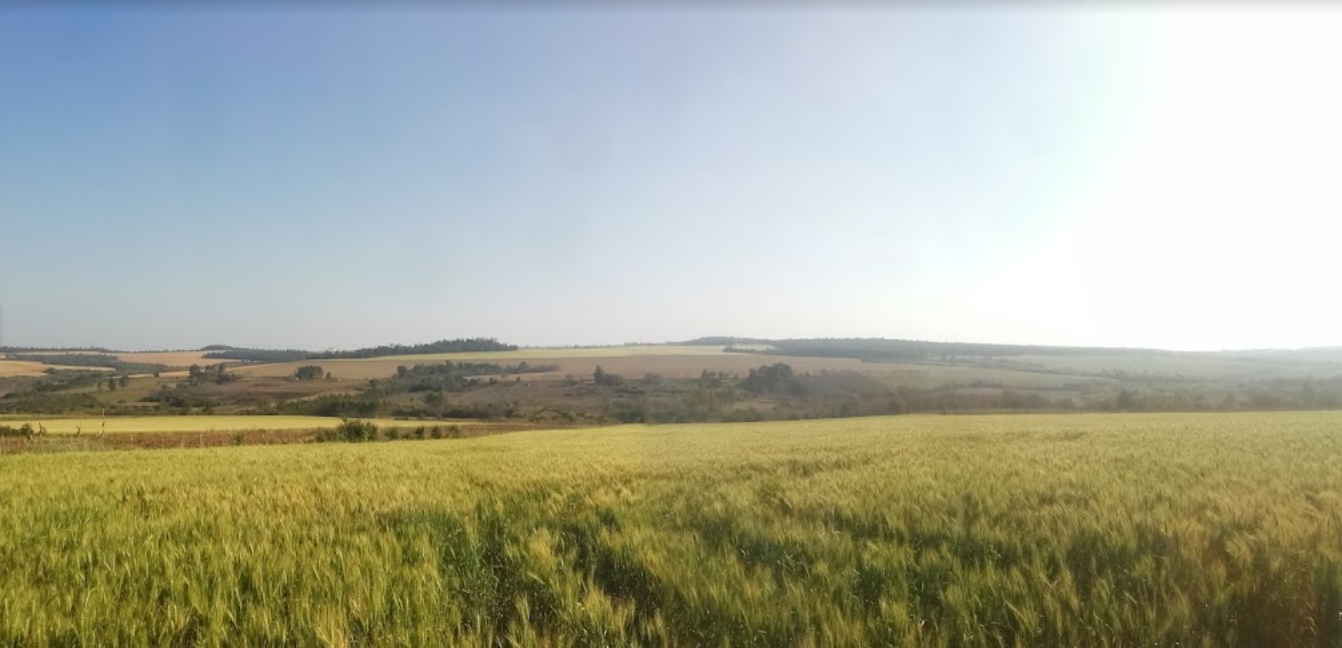
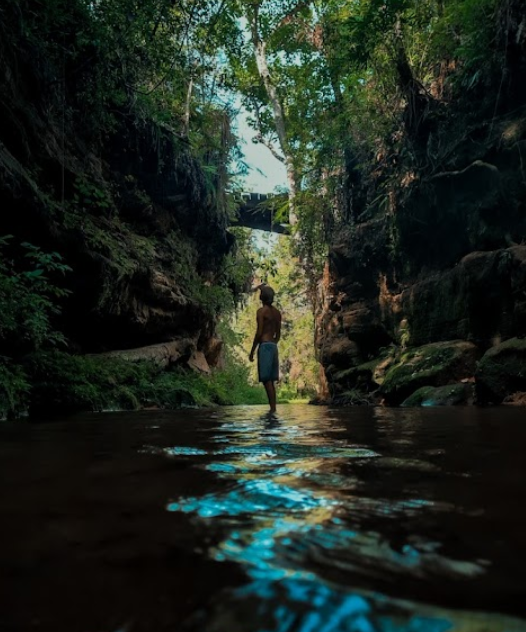
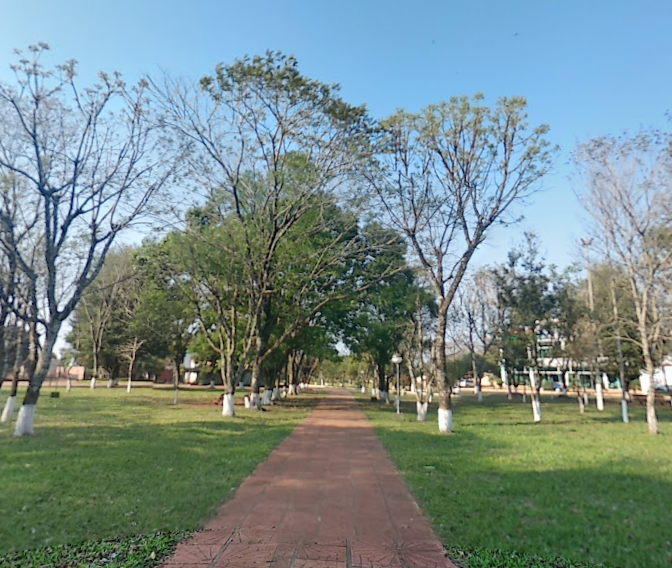
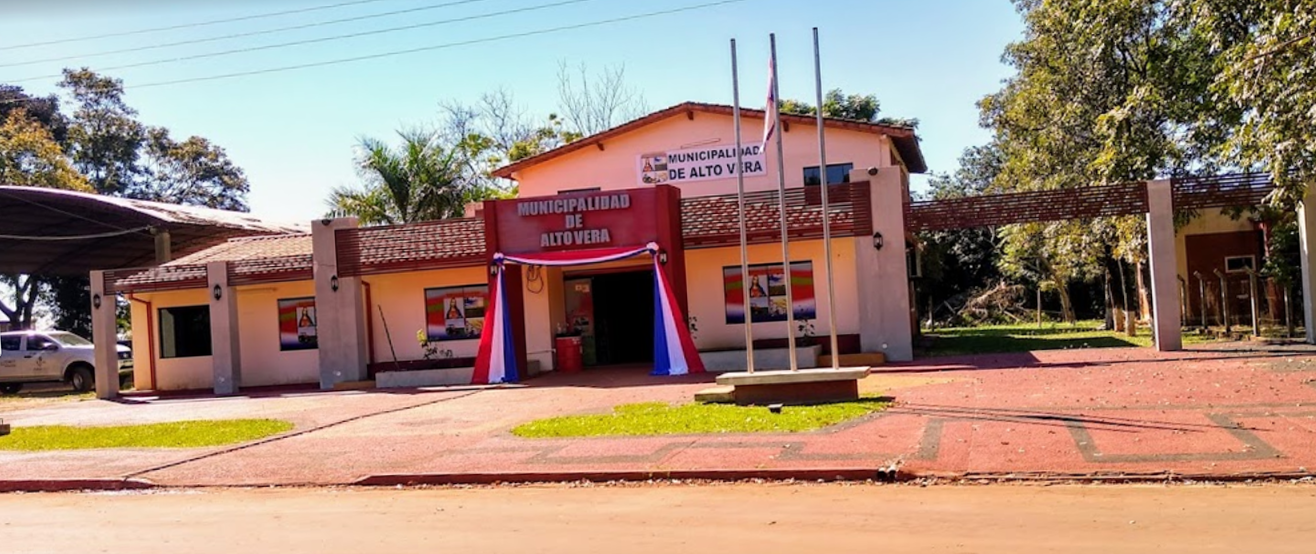
- Clockwise from top: a grassland in Alto Verá, a man standing under the Caronay Old Bridge, a view of the central park and the city hall building.

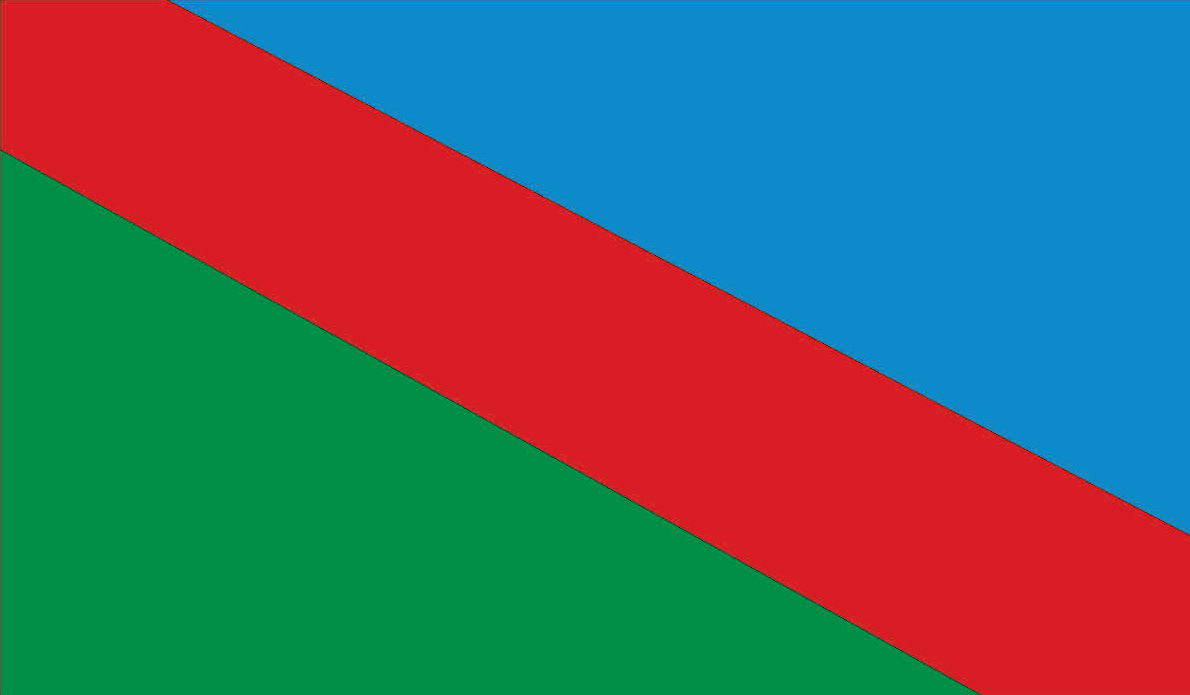
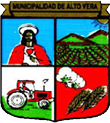
- Flag Coat of arms

- Location within Paraguay
- Coordinates: 26°45′20″S 55°45′59″W
- Country: Paraguay
- Department: Itapua

Area
  - Total: 886.8 km^{2} (342.4 sq mi)
- Elevation: 297 m (974 ft)

Population (2022)
  - Total: 11,503
  - Density: 12.97/km^{2} (33.60/sq mi)
- Time zone: UTC-4
- Postal code: 6680
- Website: https://www.altovera.gov.py

Alto Verá is a district in the Itapúa Department of Paraguay. It is spread over an area of 886.8 km^{2} (342.4 sq mi) and had a population of 11,503 inhabitants as per the 2022 census. It was established in December 1984, and was named as Alto Verá in January 1990.

== History ==
Alto Verá district was established as per Law No.1101 on 20 December 1984 as "Doña Heriberta Stroessner de Iglesias" during the presidency of Alfredo Stroessner. It was renamed to Alto Verá by Law No. 66 enacted on 19 January 1990.

== Geography ==
Alto Verá is a district in the Itapúa Department in Paraguay. It occupies an area of approximately 886.8 km^{2} (342.4 sq mi). It is in the north-central part of the department, approximately 95 km (59 mi) from the departmental capital of Encarnación, and 406 km (252 mi) from the national capital of Asunción.

The San Rafael National Park is a protected reserve area in the district, and has several waterfalls. The Kanguery Biological Station is located within the national park. The Arroyo cavern is formed by a rock crevice, which leads to a 20 ft (6.1 m) high waterfall.

Alto Vera is located at an elevation of 298.47 m (979.2 ft) above sea level. It has a tropical savanna climate (Köppen climate classification: Aw) with an average annual temperature of 23.63 °C (74.53 °F), and a precipitation of 176.55 mm (6.951 in).

== Demographics and economy ==
As per the 2022 census, Alto Verá had a population of 11,503 inhabitants, a decrease compared to 13,799 inhabitants recorded in the 2002 census. As per the 2022 census, the district had 6,115 male inhabitants and 5,388 female inhabitants in 2022. Majority (91.3%) of the population was classified as rural, and the rest (8.7%) lived in the urban areas. About 32% of the population was below the age of fourteen, and 7.3% was more than 65 years of age.

The economy is majorly dependent on agriculture, particularly the production of soybeans.
