= Tomás Romero Pereira, Paraguay =

Tomás Romero Pereira
- Town and district
- Location within Paraguay
- Coordinates: 26.5304°S 55.2601°W
- Country: Paraguay
- Department: Itapúa

Population (2008)
  - Total: 6,522

Tomás Romero Pereira, commonly known as Maria Auxiliadora, is a town and district in the Itapúa Department of Paraguay.

== Sources ==
- World Gazeteer: Paraguay – World-Gazetteer.com
- Tomas Romero Pereira Municipality – Tomas Romero Pereira Municipality
