= Edelira =

- district
- Location within Paraguay
- Coordinates: 26°45′0″S 55°16′12″W
- Country: Paraguay
- Department: Itapúa Department

Area
  - Total: 641.6 km^{2} (247.7 sq mi)

Population (2022)
  - Total: 17,362
  - Density: 27.06/km^{2} (70.1/sq mi)

Edelira is a district in the Itapúa Department of Paraguay. The district spans 641.6 square kilometers and its population consisted of 17,362 residents as of the 2022 Paraguayan census. It is located in the southern part of the country, about 410 kilometers southeast of the national capital, Asunción and 96 kilometers northeast of the department capital, Encarnación. The local economy is mostly rural, driven by a variety of crops, cattle breeding, and small-scale artisanal industries.

== Geography and location ==
Edelira is located in the southern part of Paraguay, in the Itapúa Department, about 410 kilometers southeast of the national capital, Asunción and 96 kilometers northeast of the department capital, Encarnación.

== Demographics ==
According to data from the General Directorate of Statistics of Paraguay, the population of Edelira declined from 22,287 inhabitants recorded in the 2002 Paraguayan census to 17,362 inhabitants recorded in the 2022 Paraguayan census, representing a negative annual growth rate of -1.2% over the two decade period. Given the district's total land area of 641.6 square kilometers, the population density stands at 27.06 inhabitants per square kilometer. The 2022 census data revealed a slight gender imbalance within the district, with males comprising 51.8% of the population (8,998 individuals) and females accounting for 48.2% (8,364 individuals). In terms of age distribution, the population was mostly working age individuals, with 63.2% (10,978 individuals) falling into the 15-64 age bracket. Children between the ages of 0-14 made up 26.5% of the population (4,596 individuals), while older adults aged 65 and over accounted for the remaining 10.3% (1,788 individuals). Geographically, Edelira is overwhelmingly rural in character, with the vast majority of the population (89.7%) residing in rural areas, with only 10.3% residing in urban centers.

== Economy ==
The economy of Edelira is primarily driven by the agricultural and livestock sectors. Local agriculture is diversified, focusing on the cultivation of soybeans, wheat, sunflower, corn, cotton, yerba mate, cassava, and tung. Additionally, the livestock sector includes cattle breeding and fattening. Other important sources of local income include beekeeping, artisanal sugarcane honey packaging, charcoal manufacturing, and rural tourism.
