= Guayaibí =

Guayaibi

- Location within Paraguay
- Coordinates: 24°31′48″S 56°25′48″W
- Country: Paraguay
- Department: San Pedro

Population (2008)
  - Total: 2 674

Guayaibi is a town in the San Pedro department of Paraguay. It includes such notable communities as Carayao-i and Dos Mil Fatima.

== Sources ==
- World Gazeteer: Paraguay – World-Gazetteer.com
