= Pedro Juan Caballero, Paraguay =

Pedro Juan Caballero
- City
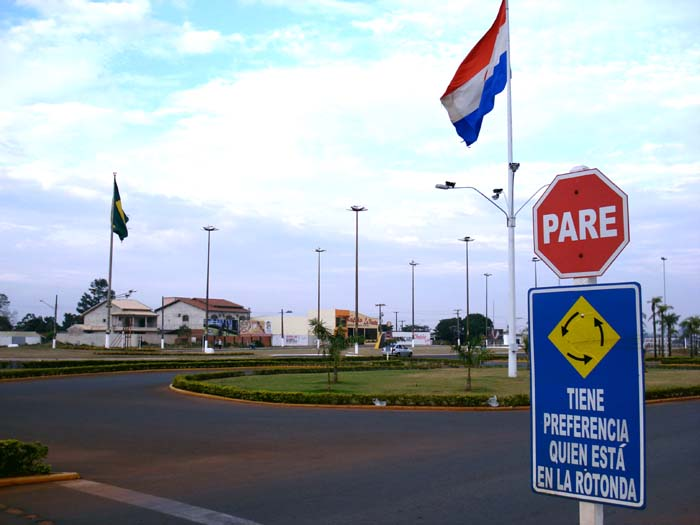
- View of the border with the city of Ponta Porã, Brazil.

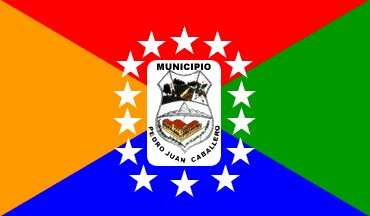
- Flag

- Location within Paraguay
- Coordinates: 22°31′48″S 55°45′0″W
- Country: Paraguay
- Department: Amambay
- Founded: December 1, 1899

Government
  - Intendant: Jose Carlos Acevedo (PLRA)
  - Demonym: pedrojuanio/a

Area
  - Total: 588 km^{2} (227 sq mi)
- Elevation: 607 m (1,991 ft)

Population (2025)
  - Total: 122,190
  - Density: 208/km^{2} (538/sq mi)
- Time zone: UTC-03 (PYT)
- Climate: Af

Pedro Juan Caballero (Spanish pronunciation: [ˈpeðɾo ˈxwaŋ kaβaˈʎeɾo]) is a Paraguayan city and the capital of the Amambay Department. It lies on the border with the Brazilian city of Ponta Porã in the state of Mato Grosso do Sul and is known as a centre for cheap electronic and consumer goods. This city is the highest city in Paraguay at 670 m (2201 ft) above sea level and is named after Pedro Juan Caballero. Pedro Juan Caballero is serviced by the Dr. Augusto Roberto Fuster International Airport and the country's most modern shopping centre, the Shopping Dubai, which cost US$30million.

The Blue Lagoon Amambay Hotel & Residential Complex is located in the city, the hotel is modernly structured and Paraguay.com considered it a First World condominium. The city is home to the Club Sportivo 2 de Mayo, counting with the Monumental Río Parapití which was used for the 1999 Copa América and is Paraguay's fifth biggest football stadium.

== History ==
Pedro Juan Caballero originated around a small lake. The city based its economy initially on the processing of yerba mate (it is located in the south end of the herds of Tacurupyta, that, after the War of the Triple Alliance, were almost totally passed into the hands of Brazil) and the forest exploitation. On December 1, 1899, a police station was built, near the Punta Porá Lagoon, a date that is considered to be that of the creation of the city. Some scholars, however, consider that the correct date of foundation is August 30, 1901. In 1899, merchant Don Jorge Casaccia, owner of large tracts of land, plantations and an import-export company founded at the end of the War of the Triple Alliance, a large shareholder of "La Industrial Paraguaya" and the "Mercantile Bank", ceded to the government a land for the settlement of the population, according to SA Cardona.

The first house was built in 1894, owned by Don Jose Tapia Ortiz, although it actually settled in a place called "Portera", a year after the foundation of Ponta Porã. But as early as 1893, Don Pablino Ramirez had settled with his wagons and footpaths on the shores of Lake Punta Porá, making it difficult to known for sure who was the first "official" Pedrojuanino. Pedro Juan Caballero was founded on December 1, 1900. On December 13, 1901, the first peace court was created, with José Ramón Giménez as the first judge. On December 29, 1905, the Junta Económico Administrativa was created to carry out activities very similar to those of the present communes and municipalities.

Don Rufino Spika Henry was the first president. On July 10, 1945, the city of Pedro Juan Caballero was designated capital of the department of Amambay XIII. In the second half of the 20th century, the city had a rapid commercial development, being nowadays not only a border trade city with Brazil, but also a tourist city and host of international events.

== Population ==
The district of Pedro Juan Caballero has a total of 114,917 inhabitants according to the census conducted by the General Directorate of Statistics, Surveys and Censuses in 2002; of this total 77,504 inhabitants are in the urban area of the district, the rest of the population are in the rural area. It is the most populated city in the northern part of the country.

== Government ==
In 2020, 75 prisoners escaped the local prison in the city.

== Education ==
The district has a total of 31 secondary schools and high schools. Among the private ones, the best known are: The Parochial Rosenstiel School, of the Redemptorist Missionaries; Santa María de los Ángeles School, of the Franciscan Education Sisters of Cristo Rey; the Ebenezer College and the Baptist School. Among the nationals, the best known is the Dr. Raúl Peña Regional Education Center and the Cerro Corá National School of Commerce.

It is the headquarters of universities such as the subsidiaries of the Faculty of Agricultural Sciences and the Faculty of Law and Social Sciences of the National University of Asunción; private universities such as the Universidad Sudamericana, Columbia University, UniNorte, the Catholic University "Nuestra Señora de la Asunción", Polytechnic and Artistic University of Paraguay, Universidad del Pacífico, Intercontinental University, American University, Technological University, La Serrana University, Three University Borders, San Carlos University, San Lorenzo University, National University of Villa Rica del Espíritu Santo, among others.

== Attractions ==
Pedro Juan Caballero is serviced by the Dr. Augusto Roberto Fuster International Airport and the country's most modern shopping centre, the Shopping Dubai, which cost US$30million.

== Climate ==
The climate of Pedro Juan Caballero is classified as humid subtropical climate (Köppen climate classification Cfa) bordering with tropical rainforest climate (Af) according to the Köppen climate classification. The average annual temperature is 21 °C (70 °F). The annual average of precipitations is abundant, with 1,650 millimetres (65 in) approximately.

Summers are hot, with a January average of 25 °C (77 °F). The high humidity usually becomes suffocating to heat. The winter is mild, with an average July temperature of 18 °C (64 °F). Temperatures below 0 °C (32 °F) or above 36 °C (97 °F) are rarely encountered.

Climate data for Pedro Juan Caballero (1991-2020, extremes 1973-present)
Month	Jan	Feb	Mar	Apr	May	Jun	Jul	Aug	Sep	Oct	Nov	Dec	Year
Record high °C (°F)	37.0 (98.6)	39.4 (102.9)	38.0 (100.4)	36.8 (98.2)	34.8 (94.6)	34.0 (93.2)	33.4 (92.1)	37.6 (99.7)	39.6 (103.3)	39.8 (103.6)	39.2 (102.6)	38.8 (101.8)	39.8 (103.6)
Mean daily maximum °C (°F)	30.6 (87.1)	30.3 (86.5)	30.1 (86.2)	28.5 (83.3)	24.8 (76.6)	24.1 (75.4)	24.5 (76.1)	27.2 (81.0)	28.6 (83.5)	29.8 (85.6)	29.9 (85.8)	30.4 (86.7)	28.2 (82.8)
Daily mean °C (°F)	24.8 (76.6)	24.4 (75.9)	24.1 (75.4)	22.4 (72.3)	19.0 (66.2)	18.2 (64.8)	17.9 (64.2)	20.0 (68.0)	21.6 (70.9)	23.5 (74.3)	23.9 (75.0)	24.7 (76.5)	22.0 (71.6)
Mean daily minimum °C (°F)	21.0 (69.8)	20.7 (69.3)	20.1 (68.2)	18.3 (64.9)	15.3 (59.5)	14.3 (57.7)	13.3 (55.9)	14.9 (58.8)	16.6 (61.9)	19.1 (66.4)	19.5 (67.1)	20.6 (69.1)	17.8 (64.0)
Record low °C (°F)	12.0 (53.6)	11.2 (52.2)	8.0 (46.4)	3.6 (38.5)	1.0 (33.8)	−0.2 (31.6)	−1.8 (28.8)	0.4 (32.7)	1.4 (34.5)	8.4 (47.1)	7.0 (44.6)	9.0 (48.2)	−1.8 (28.8)
Average precipitation mm (inches)	181.9 (7.16)	192.6 (7.58)	147.5 (5.81)	154.5 (6.08)	142.6 (5.61)	96.1 (3.78)	52.7 (2.07)	54.0 (2.13)	111.1 (4.37)	182.2 (7.17)	197.1 (7.76)	196.5 (7.74)	1,708.7 (67.27)
Average precipitation days (≥ 1.0 mm)	12	10	10	7	7	6	4	5	6	9	9	10	95
Average relative humidity (%)	75	75	71	71	72	73	64	57	64	67	67	71	69
Mean monthly sunshine hours	223.7	181.4	219.5	228.3	192.6	185.8	216.5	238.4	207.8	211.4	224.4	227.3	2,556.9
Percentage possible sunshine	54	51	58	67	57	59	65	69	58	54	57	55	58
Source 1: WMO (precipitation days 1971-2000)
Source 2: NOAA (extremes) DWD (humidity 1959-1968 and sunshine 1994-2022)

Climate data for Pedro Juan Caballero, Paraguay (1961-1990 normals)
Month	Jan	Feb	Mar	Apr	May	Jun	Jul	Aug	Sep	Oct	Nov	Dec	Year
Mean daily maximum °C (°F)	28.5 (83.3)	29.1 (84.4)	28.5 (83.3)	27.7 (81.9)	24.6 (76.3)	24.2 (75.6)	23.8 (74.8)	25.9 (78.6)	26.6 (79.9)	27.2 (81.0)	28.8 (83.8)	29.2 (84.6)	27.0 (80.6)
Daily mean °C (°F)	23.9 (75.0)	24.2 (75.6)	23.3 (73.9)	21.9 (71.4)	19.1 (66.4)	18.3 (64.9)	18.1 (64.6)	19.6 (67.3)	20.8 (69.4)	22.0 (71.6)	23.3 (73.9)	24.1 (75.4)	21.6 (70.8)
Mean daily minimum °C (°F)	19.3 (66.7)	19.3 (66.7)	17.8 (64.0)	16.1 (61.0)	13.6 (56.5)	13.1 (55.6)	12.3 (54.1)	13.3 (55.9)	15.0 (59.0)	16.8 (62.2)	17.8 (64.0)	19.0 (66.2)	16.1 (61.0)
Average precipitation mm (inches)	190.0 (7.48)	139.0 (5.47)	151.0 (5.94)	122.0 (4.80)	136.0 (5.35)	101.0 (3.98)	41.0 (1.61)	70.0 (2.76)	90.0 (3.54)	173.0 (6.81)	182.0 (7.17)	187.0 (7.36)	1,582 (62.27)
Average precipitation days	13	9	10	7	8	5	4	6	7	8	11	10	98
Source: Deutscher Wetterdinest

== Transportation ==
Route 5 "Gral. Bernardino Caballero" connects the city with Concepción and Asunción.

== Consular representation ==
Brazil has a Consulate in Pedro Juan Caballero.

== See also ==
- Ponta Porã
- Chiriguelo
- Ciudad del Este
- Dourados

== Sources ==
- World Gazeteer: Paraguay – World-Gazetteer.com
