= List of cities and towns in Paraguay =

This is a list of towns and cities in Paraguay.

== A ==
- Abaí
- Acahay
- Aguaray
- Alberdi
- Alto Verá
- Altos
- Areguá
- Arroyito
- Asunción
- Atyrá
- Ayolas

== B ==
- Bella Vista, Amambay
- Benjamín Aceval, Paraguay

== C ==
- Caacupé
- Caaguazú
- Caapucú
- Caazapá
- Cambyreta
- Capiatá
- Capiíbary
- Capitán Bado
- Capitán Mauricio José Troche
- Capitán Meza
- Capitán Miranda
- Caraguatay
- Carapeguá
- Carayaó
- Carmen del Paraná
- Cerrito
- Ciudad del Este
- Concepción
- Coronel Bogado
- Coronel Martínez
- Coronel Oviedo
- Curuguaty

== D ==
- Desmochados
- Doctor Botrell
- Doctor Cecilio Báez
- Doctor Eulogio Estigarribia
- Doctor Juan Manuel Frutos
- Doctor Moisés Santiago Bertoni
- Doctor Pedro P. Peña

== E ==
- Edelira
- Encarnación
- Escobar

== F ==
- Fernando de la Mora
- Fernheim Colony
- Filadelfia
- Fuerte Olimpo

== G ==
- General Artigas
- General Delgado
- General Elizardo Aquino
- General Eugenio A. Garay
- General Francisco Caballero Álvarez
- General Higinio Morínigo
- General Isidro Resquín
- General José Eduvigis Díaz
- Guarambaré
- Guayaibi
- Guazu-Cua

== H ==
- Hernandarías
- Hohenau
- Horqueta
- Humaitá

== I ==
- Independencia
- Isla Pucu
- Isla Umbú
- Itacurubí de la Cordillera
- Itacurubí del Rosario
- Itanará
- Itapé
- Itapúa Poty
- Itaquyry
- Itauguá
- Iturbe

== J ==
- José Falcón
- José Fassardi
- José Ocampos
- Juan Emilio O'Leary

== K ==
- Karapaí
- Katueté

== L ==
- La Pastora
- La Victoria
- Lambaré
- Laureles
- Leandro Oviedo
- Limpio
- Luque

== M ==
- María Antonia
- Mariano Roque Alonso
- Mariscal Estigarribia
- Mariscal Francisco Solano López
- Mayor José de Jesús Martínez
- Mayor Otaño
- Mayor Pablo Lagerenza
- Mbaracayú
- Mbocayaty
- Mbocayty del Yhaguy
- Mbutuy
- Mbuyapey
- Menno Colony
- Minga Guazú

== N ==
- Nanawa
- Natalicio Talavera
- Natalio
- Neuland Colony
- Nueva Alborada
- Nueva Germania
- Nueva Italia
- Nueva Londres

== Ñ ==
- Ñacunday
- Ñemby
- Ñumí

== O ==
- Obligado

== P ==
- Paraguarí
- Paso de Patria
- Paso Yobai
- Pedro Juan Caballero
- Pilar
- Pirayú
- Pozo Colorado
- Presidente Franco
- Primero de Marzo
- Puerto Pinasco
- Piribebuy

== Q ==
- Quiindy
- Quyquyhó

== R ==
- Raúl Arsenio Oviedo
- Repatriación

== S ==
- Salto del Guairá
- San Alberto
- San Bernardino
- San Cosme y Damián
- San Estanislao
- San Ignacio
- San José de los Arroyos
- San Juan Bautista de Ñeembucú
- San Juan Bautista
- San Juan del Paraná
- San Juan Nepomuceno
- San Lorenzo
- San Pablo
- San Pedro de Ycuamandiyú
- San Pedro del Paraná
- San Rafael del Paraná
- San Vicente Pancholo
- Sapucaí

== T ==
- Tacuaras
- Tacuatí
- Tavaí
- Tebicuary-mí
- Tomás Romero Pereira
- R. I. Tres Corrales
- Tres de Mayo
- Trinidad

== U ==
- Unión

== V ==
- Vaquería
- Veinticinco de Diciembre
- Villa Elisa
- Villa Franca
- Villa Hayes
- Villa Oliva
- Villalbín
- Villarrica
- Villeta

== Y ==
- Yabebyry
- Yaguarón
- Yasy Cañy
- Yataity
- Yataity del Norte
- Yatytay
- Yby Pytá
- Ybycuí
- Ybytimí
- Yegros
- Ygatimi
- Yhú
- Ypacaraí
- Ypané
- Ypehú
- Yuty

== Z ==
- Zanja Pytá

== See also ==
- List of cities and towns in Paraguay by population
- List of cities by country
