= Route 20 (Paraguay) =

National Route 20
- Ruta nacional PY20
- PY20 highlighted in red

Route information
- Length: 230 km (140 mi)

Major junctions
- East end: San Patricio
- PY01 in San Patricio, MS; PY04 in Paso de Patria, NE
- West end: Paso de Patria

Location
- Country: Paraguay

Highway system
- Highways in Paraguay

National Route 20 (officially, PY20, better known as Ruta Veinte) is a highway in Paraguay, which runs from San Patricio to Paso de Patria, connecting the southern cities of the departments of Misiones and Ñeembucú. It's currently paved only from San Patricio to Yabebyry.

== History ==
With the Resolution N° 1090/19, it obtained its current number and elevated to National Route in 2019 by the MOPC (Ministry of Public Works and Communications).

== Distances, cities and towns ==
The following table shows the distances traversed by PY20 in each different department, showing cities and towns that it passes by (or near).

Km	City	Department	Junctions
0	San Patricio	Misiones	PY01
17	Santiago	Misiones	
49	Ayolas	Misiones	
85	Yabebyry	Misiones	
119	Laureles	Ñeembucú	
170	Villalbín	Ñeembucú	
201	Mayor José J. Martinez	Ñeembucú	
217	Gral. Jose Eduvigis Diaz	Ñeembucú	
230	Paso de Patria	Ñeembucú	PY04
