= Route 4 (Paraguay) =

Road in Paraguay

National Route 04
- Ruta nacional PY04
- Gral. José Eduvigis Díaz
- PY04 highlighted in red

Route information
- Length: 197 km (122 mi)

Major junctions
- East end: San Ignacio
- Route 1 in San Ignacio, MS PY19 in Pilar, NE Route 20 in Paso de Patria, NE
- West end: Paso de Patria

Location
- Country: Paraguay

Highway system
- Highways in Paraguay

National Route 4 (officially, PY04, also known as Ruta Cuarta) is a highway in Paraguay, which runs from San Ignacio to Paso de Patria. In San Ignacio it connects with the National Route 1.

== Distances, cities and towns ==
The following table shows the distances traversed by National Route 4 in each different department, showing cities and towns that it passes by (or near).

| Km | City | Department | Junctions |
|---|---|---|---|
| 0 | San Ignacio | Misiones | PY01 |
| 100 | Guazú Cuá | Ñeembucú | |
| 102 | Tacuaras | Ñeembucú | |
| 137 | Pilar | Ñeembucú | PY19 |
| 177 | Humaitá | Ñeembucú | |
| 197 | Paso de Patria | Ñeembucú | PY20 |
