= Misiones Department =

Department of Paraguay

Misiones Department Departamento de Misiones (Spanish) Tetãvore Misiónes (Guarani)
- Department
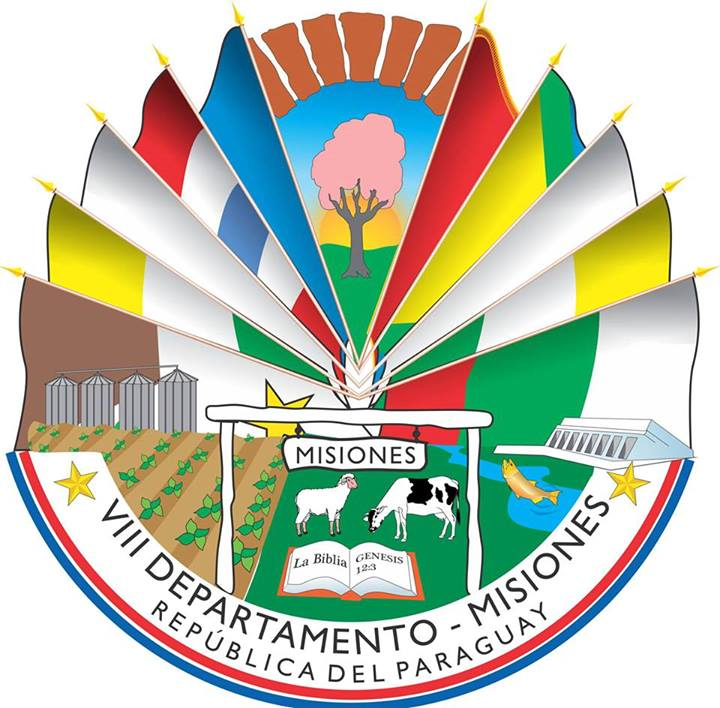
- Flag Coat of arms

- Misiones shown in red
- Coordinates: 26°38′S 57°10′W
- Country: Paraguay
- Region: Eastern Region
- Established: 1906
- Capital: San Juan Bautista
- Largest city: San Ignacio

Government
  - Governor: Richard Ramírez (ANR)

Area
  - Total: 9,556 km^{2} (3,690 sq mi)
  - Rank: 12

Population (2022 census)
  - Total: 111,142
  - Rank: 14
  - Density: 11.63/km^{2} (30.12/sq mi)
- Time zone: UTC-04 (AST)
  - Summer (DST): UTC-03 (ADT)
- ISO 3166 code: PY-8
- Number of Districts: 10
- Website: www.misiones.gov.py

Misiones (Spanish pronunciation: [miˈsjo.nes]) is a department located in the southern region of Paraguay. Its capital is San Juan Bautista. The eighth of Paraguay's 17 departments, it was created in 1906, then known as the San Ignacio Department, and was not given its present name until 1945. Its current name reflects its status as home to several Jesuit Reductions, or missions.

Misiones borders the departments of Paraguarí and Caazapá to the north, Itapúa to the east, Ñeembucú to the west, and the Corrientes Province of Argentina to the south.

== History ==
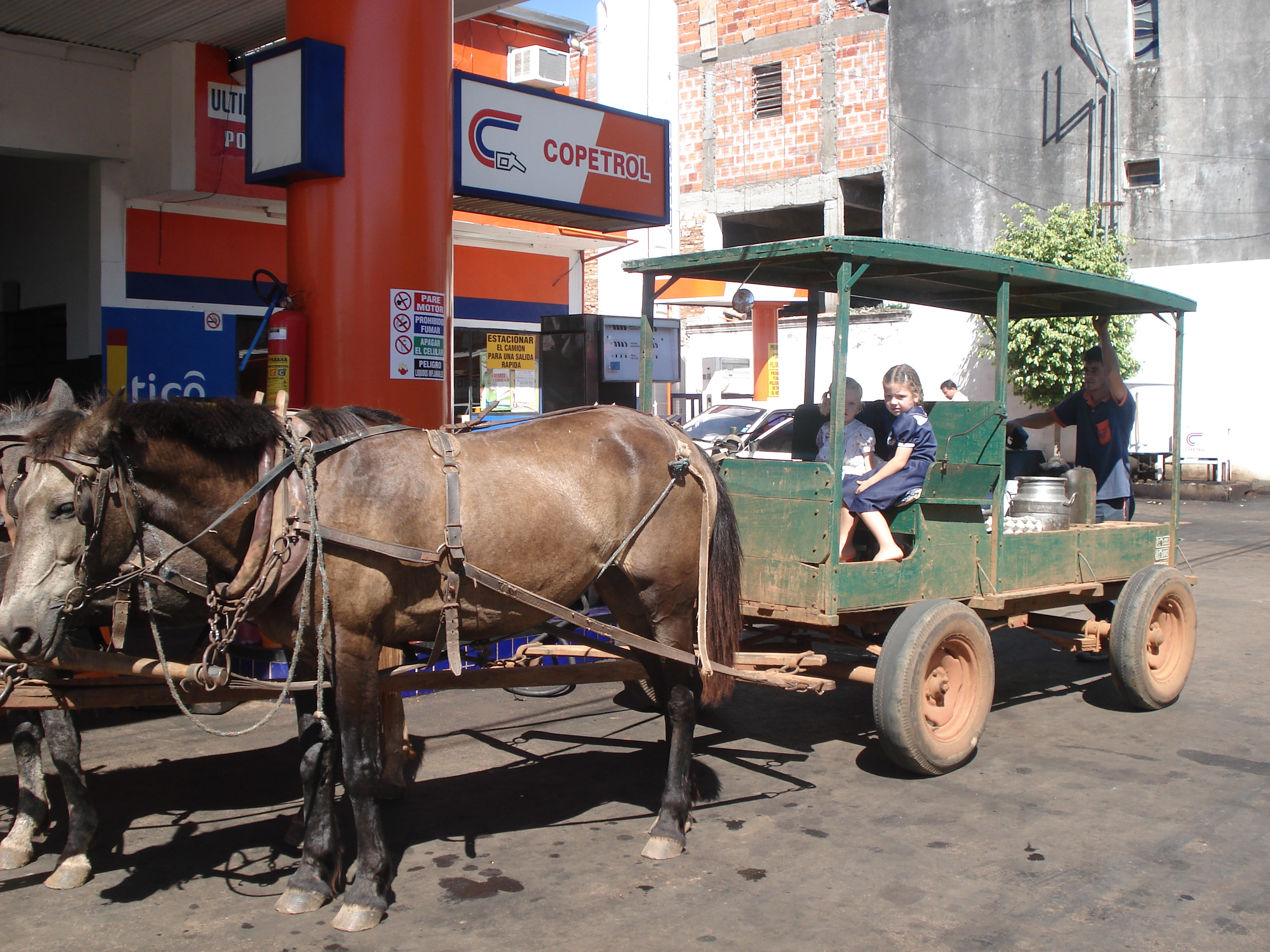
San Juan Bautista.

The modern settling of Misiones began with the arrival of Jesuit missionaries to the region in the 17th century and the subsequent establishment of several reductions whose purpose was to both civilize and catechize the indigenous Guaraní peoples. While several of these reductions would ultimately be in Argentinian and Brazilian territory, 8 of the reductions would remain in Paraguay, concentrated in what would become the Misiones and Itapúa departments. Some of these reductions, namely San Ignacio Guazú, Santa Maria de Fe and Santiago, would become the foundation for subsequent towns in Misiones.

The town of Yabebyry was established in 1790, and later, during the presidency of Carlos Antonio López, the towns of San Miguel and San Juan Bautista were founded. When the Misiones department was created in 1906 as the San Ignacio department, these towns were made several of the department's first 8 districts, along with Santa Rosa, Ayolas and Villa Florida. When the department was renamed in 1945, its capital was moved from San Ignacio to San Juan Bautista.

== Geography ==
Misiones department is relatively flat and crossed by a number of rivers and streams. The northern and southern borders of the department are formed by, respectively, the Tebicuary and the Paraná rivers, the latter of which is an important waterway in the region. A number of other streams cross the department, including the Yabebyry, Atingui, San Roque, Sauce, Uruguay, Ca'a Po'i, Tororo, San Tadeo, San Antonio and Itay.

== Districts ==
The department is divided into ten districts:

District	Area (km^{2})	Population (2021)
Ayolas	1,060	19,265
San Ignacio	2,020	35,497
San Juan Bautista	2,300	24,484
San Miguel	540	6,075
San Patricio	190	3,758
Santa María	520	9,146
Santa Rosa	1,010	18,558
Santiago	740	6,532
Villa Florida	196	3,787
Yabebyry	984	2,683

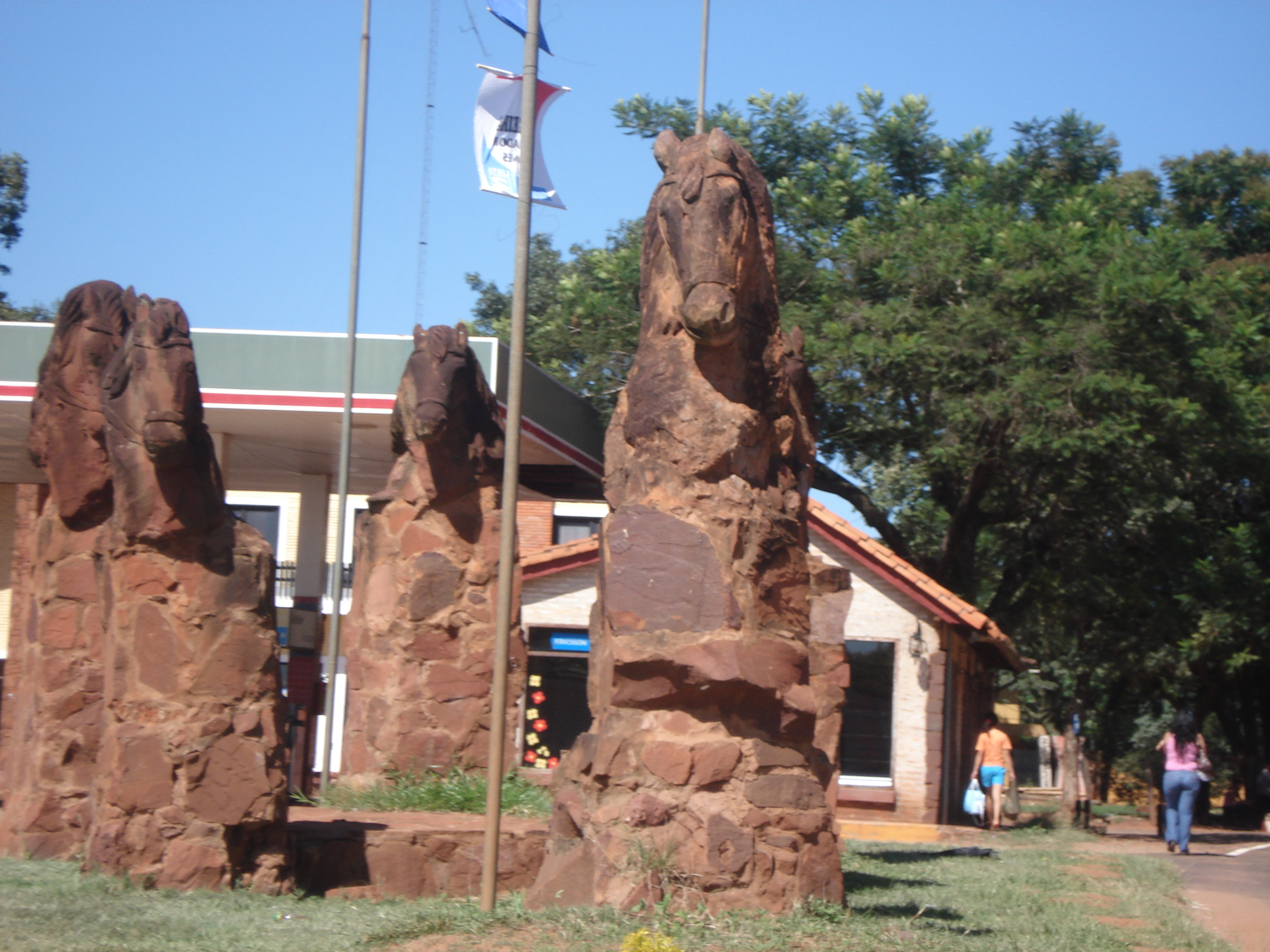
San Ignacio Guasú.

== Economy ==
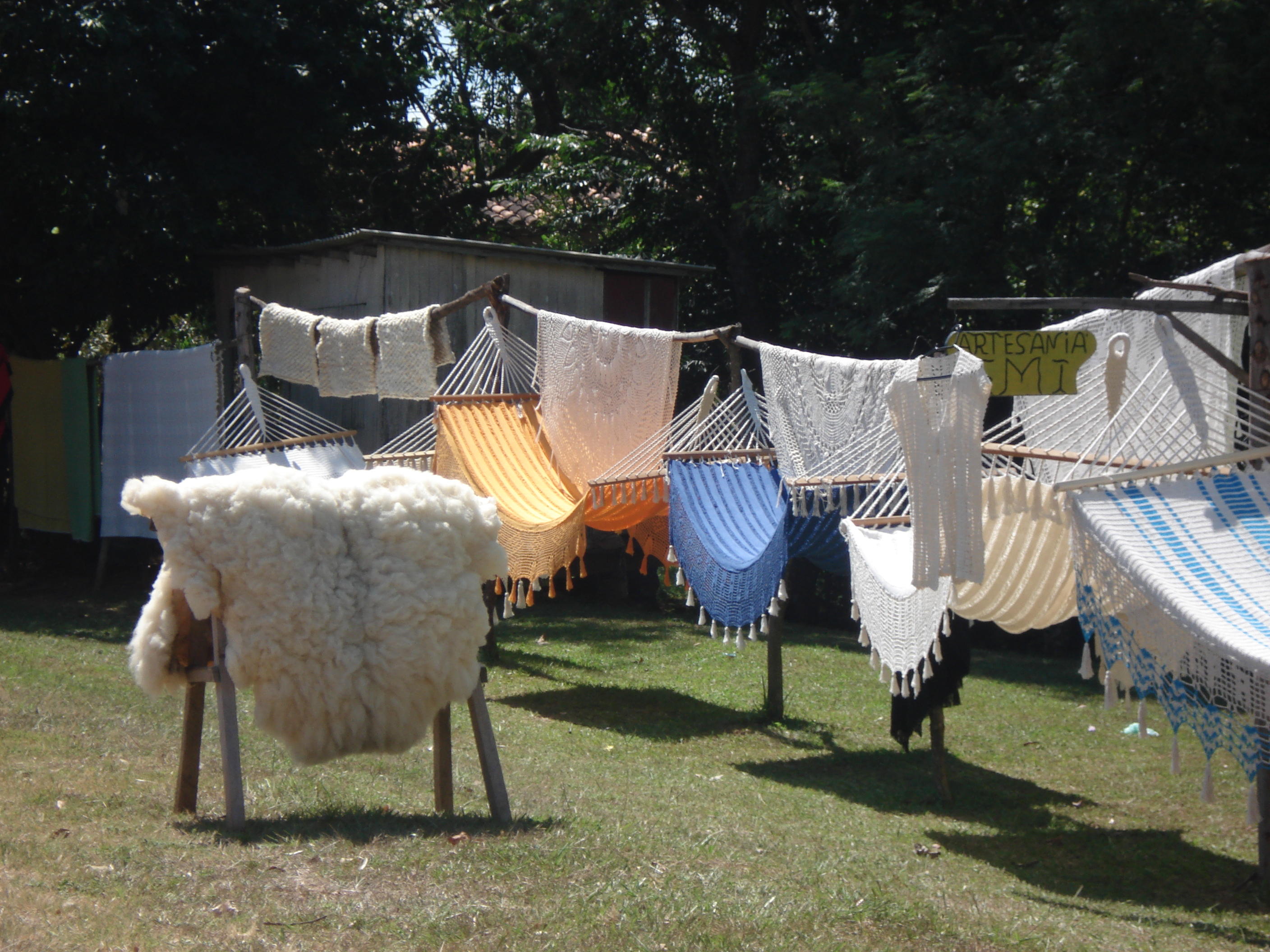
San Miguel

The main economic activities are livestock raising and agriculture. Cattle are the most common livestock, and pigs, sheep, horses, and goats are common as well. Agriculture is widely practiced, with fields mainly in the north and center of the department. The main crops are rice, soya, corn, sweet oranges, sugar cane, sweet potatoes, potatoes, and cotton.

== Transportation ==
=== Roads ===
Misiones is connected to Asunción and Encarnación via national route PY01 which passes through 6 of the 10 districts: Villa Florida, San Miguel, San Juan Bautista, San Ignacio, Santa Rosa and San Patricio, it even passes through the district of Santiago, but not by its urban area.
The national routes PY04 and PY20 connects Misiones with neighbor Ñeembucú department.
All ten districts urban areas are accessible by paved road.

=== Airports ===
Small airports are located in San Juan Bautista and Ayolas (Juan de Ayolas Airport) to the south.

=== Water transport ===
The southern part of the department is accessible to the Paraná River, which is navigable by large cargo ships downstream of the Yacyretá Dam near Ayolas.

== Education ==
There are numerous institutions which provide Pre-school Education, Elementary and Highschool . with Technical and Scientific emphasis.

== Tourism ==
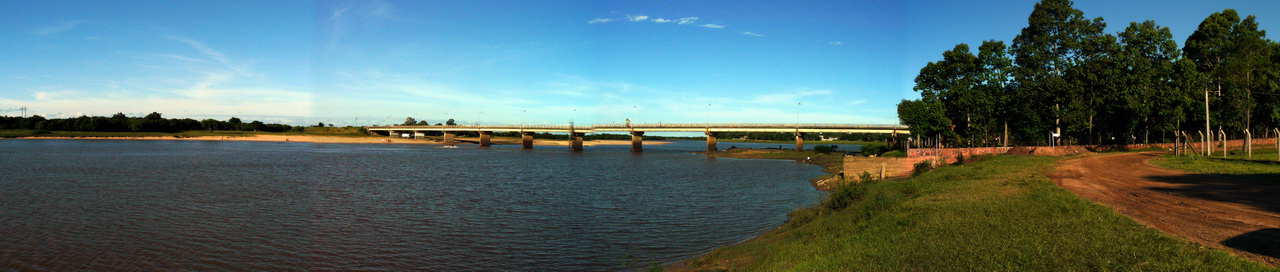
Villa Florida

Its main attractions are the beaches formed by the rivers Paraná and Tebicuary. Villa Florida is a city which offers landscapes to its visitors. This department is known by the work of evangelizing by the Jesuits priests who founded the place with many reductions. A few towns still have the remains of that era such as the colonial churches.

Part of the historical remains is exposed in Museums with many samples of wooden carvings made by the Indians at the reductions period.

== Bibliography ==
- Geografía del Paraguay - Editorial Hispana Paraguay S.R.L.- 1a. Edición 1999 - Asunción Paraguay
- Geografía Ilustrada del Paraguay - ISBN 99925-68-04-6 - Distribuidora Arami S.R.L.
- La Magia de nuestra tierra. Fundación en Alianza. Asunción. 2007.
