= Justo Villar =

Paraguayan footballer (born 1977)

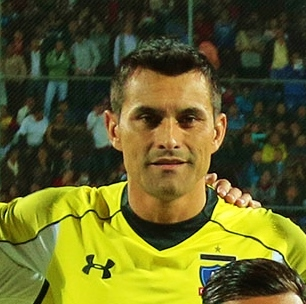
- Villar with Colo-Colo in 2016

Personal information
- Full name: Justo Wilmar Villar Viveros
- Date of birth: 30 June 1977 (age 49)
- Place of birth: Cerrito, Paraguay
- Height: 1.80 m (5 ft 11 in)
- Position: Goalkeeper

Youth career
- Sol de América

Senior career*
Years	Team	Apps	(Gls)
1996–2000	Sol de América	119	(0)
2001–2004	Libertad	109	(0)
2004–2008	Newell's Old Boys	135	(0)
2008–2011	Valladolid	44	(0)
2011–2012	Estudiantes	18	(0)
2013	Nacional	13	(0)
2013–2017	Colo-Colo	87	(0)
2017–2018	Nacional	0	(0)
Total		525	(0)

International career
1997	Paraguay U20	5	(0)
2000	Paraguay U23	4	(0)
1999–2018	Paraguay	120	(0)
Medal record
Representing Paraguay
Copa América
Runner-up	2011 Argentina	Team
- * Club domestic league appearances and goals

Justo Wilmar Villar Viveros (born 30 June 1977) is a Paraguayan former professional footballer who played as a goalkeeper.

Other than in his own country, he also played in Argentina, Spain and Chile, in a senior career that lasted 22 years.

A Paraguay international on 120 occasions, Villar represented the nation in three World Cups and seven Copa América tournaments.

== Club career ==
Born in Cerrito, Ñeembucú Department, Villar started his career at Club Sol de América where he was coached by legendary Ever Hugo Almeida, also a goalkeeper, as the team also included another player in that position as their coach, Modesto Sandoval.

In 2001, he moved to Club Libertad, where he was reunited with Sandoval: he won back-to-back Paraguayan Primera División titles with the side, in 2002 and 2003, signing the following year with Argentina's Newell's Old Boys.

As an undisputed starter, Villar helped Newell's to the 2004 Apertura championship, also being considered by the press as the Goalkeeper of the Year – previously, he had won the Paraguayan Footballer of the Year award (2004).

In January 2008, terms were agreed upon between Newell's and Real Valladolid of Spain for Villar's transfer, effective in the summer. On 14 July, he was officially presented by his new club; due to starter Sergio Asenjo's injury, he was able to appear in 15 La Liga matches in his first year.

During the 2009–10 season, Villar constantly battled for first-choice status with Jacobo, featuring in 23 games as the Castile and León side returned to Segunda División after a three-year stay. He was released in June 2011 at the age of 34, mainly due to his high salary.

The following month, Villar moved back to Argentina and signed a three-year deal with Estudiantes de La Plata. In 2013 he returned to his homeland, joining Club Nacional.

Villar changed clubs and countries again on 18 June 2013, after agreeing to a one-and-a-half-year contract with Colo-Colo in the Chilean Primera División. He helped them win the Clausura in his debut campaign, as first-choice.

After one season with Asunción-based Club Nacional, Villar announced his retirement from professional football at age 41, adding he wished to remain active in the sport.

== International career ==
Villar represented Paraguay at the 1997 FIFA World Youth Championship, and received his first cap for the full side two years later. He also appeared with the under-23s at the 2000 CONMEBOL Men Pre-Olympic Tournament, making four appearances.

Having been selected for the 2002 FIFA World Cup, backing up José Luis Chilavert, Villar was already a starter in the 2006 edition, but had a brief participation: during the first seven minutes of the opener against England, just after Carlos Gamarra's own goal, he got injured, was replaced by Aldo Bobadilla and subsequently sidelined for the rest of the tournament, in which the national team was eliminated in the first round.

In the 2010 FIFA World Cup in South Africa, Villar played all the matches for the eventual quarter-finalists and only conceded two goals, against Italy in the group stage (1–1) and Spain in the last-eight match (0–1, also saving a Xabi Alonso penalty), and was selected as captain. During the 2011 Copa América he was again first-choice and captain, and helped his team reach the final, notably saving a penalty in the quarter-finals shootout against Brazil (0–0 after 120 minutes); he was named the Best Goalkeeper for his displays during the competition, keeping clean sheets in three games.

Villar played four games in the 2015 Copa América, helping Paraguay to the fourth place in Chile.

== Career statistics ==
=== Club ===
Appearances and goals by club, season and competition
Club	Season	League			National cup		Continental		Total	
Club	Season	Division	Apps	Goals	Apps	Goals	Apps	Goals	Apps	Goals
Sol de América	1996	Paraguayan Primera División	22	0	—		—		22	0
Sol de América	1997	Paraguayan Primera División	19	0	—		—		19	0
Sol de América	1998	Paraguayan Primera División	30	0	—		—		30	0
Sol de América	1999	Paraguayan Primera División	16	0	—		—		16	0
Sol de América	2000	Paraguayan Primera División	32	0	—		—		32	0
Sol de América	Total		119	0	—		—		119	0
Libertad	2001	Paraguayan Primera División	31	0	—				31	0
Libertad	2002	Paraguayan Primera División	35	0	—		4	0	39	0
Libertad	2003	Paraguayan Primera División	28	0	—		9	0	37	0
Libertad	2004	Paraguayan Primera División	15	0	—		4	0	19	0
Libertad	Total		109	0	—		17	0	126	0
Newell's Old Boys	2004–05	Argentine Primera División	38	0	—				38	0
Newell's Old Boys	2005–06	Argentine Primera División	33	0	—		10	0	43	0
Newell's Old Boys	2006–07	Argentine Primera División	34	0	—		—		34	0
Newell's Old Boys	2007–08	Argentine Primera División	30	0	—		—		30	0
Newell's Old Boys	Total		135	0	—		10	0	145	0
Valladolid	2008–09	La Liga	15	0	2	0	—		17	0
Valladolid	2009–10	La Liga	23	0	0	0	—		23	0
Valladolid	2010–11	Segunda División	6	0	2	0	—		8	0
Valladolid	Total		44	0	4	0	—		48	0
Estudiantes	2011–12	Argentine Primera División	4	0	0	0	1	0	5	0
Estudiantes	2012–13	Argentine Primera División	14	0	—		—		14	0
Estudiantes	Total		18	0	0	0	1	0	19	0
Nacional	2013	Paraguayan Primera División	13	0	—		—		13	0
Colo-Colo	2013–14	Chilean Primera División	29	0	5	0	2	0	36	0
Colo-Colo	2014–15	Chilean Primera División	25	0	5	0	4	0	34	0
Colo-Colo	2015–16	Chilean Primera División	23	0	7	0	5	0	35	0
Colo-Colo	2016–17	Chilean Primera División	10	0	5	0	2	0	17	0
Colo-Colo	Total		87	0	22	0	13	0	122	0
Nacional	2018	Paraguayan Primera División	0	0	—		0	0	0	0
Career total			525	0	26	0	41	0	592	0

=== International ===
Appearances and goals by national team and year
National team	Year	Apps	Goals
Paraguay	1999	8	0
Paraguay	2000	1	0
Paraguay	2001	1	0
Paraguay	2002	0	0
Paraguay	2003	8	0
Paraguay	2004	8	0
Paraguay	2005	9	0
Paraguay	2006	5	0
Paraguay	2007	11	0
Paraguay	2008	9	0
Paraguay	2009	10	0
Paraguay	2010	12	0
Paraguay	2011	11	0
Paraguay	2012	5	0
Paraguay	2013	4	0
Paraguay	2014	2	0
Paraguay	2015	7	0
Paraguay	2016	7	0
Paraguay	2018	1	0
Total		120	0

== Honours ==
Libertad

- Paraguayan Primera División: 2002, 2003

Newell's Old Boys

- Argentine Primera División: 2004 Apertura

Colo-Colo

- Campeonato Nacional (Chile): 2014 Clausura, 2015 Apertura
- Copa Chile: runner-up 2015

Paraguay

- Copa América: runner-up 2011

Individual

- Paraguayan Footballer of the Year: 2004
- 2011 Copa América: Golden Glove

== See also ==
- List of men's footballers with 100 or more international caps
- Players and Records in Paraguayan Football
