= Alberdi, Paraguay =

Alberdi
- Town
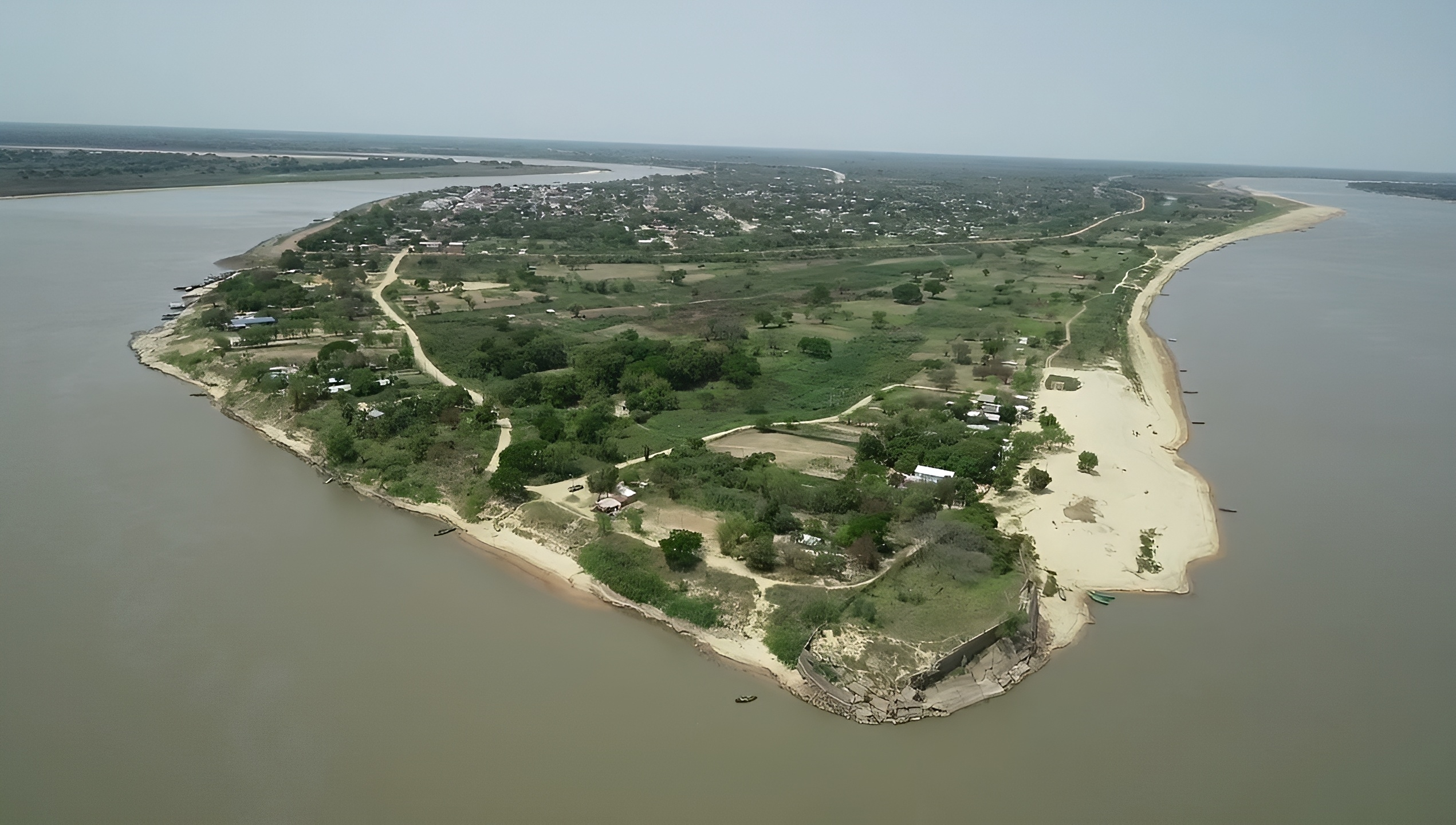
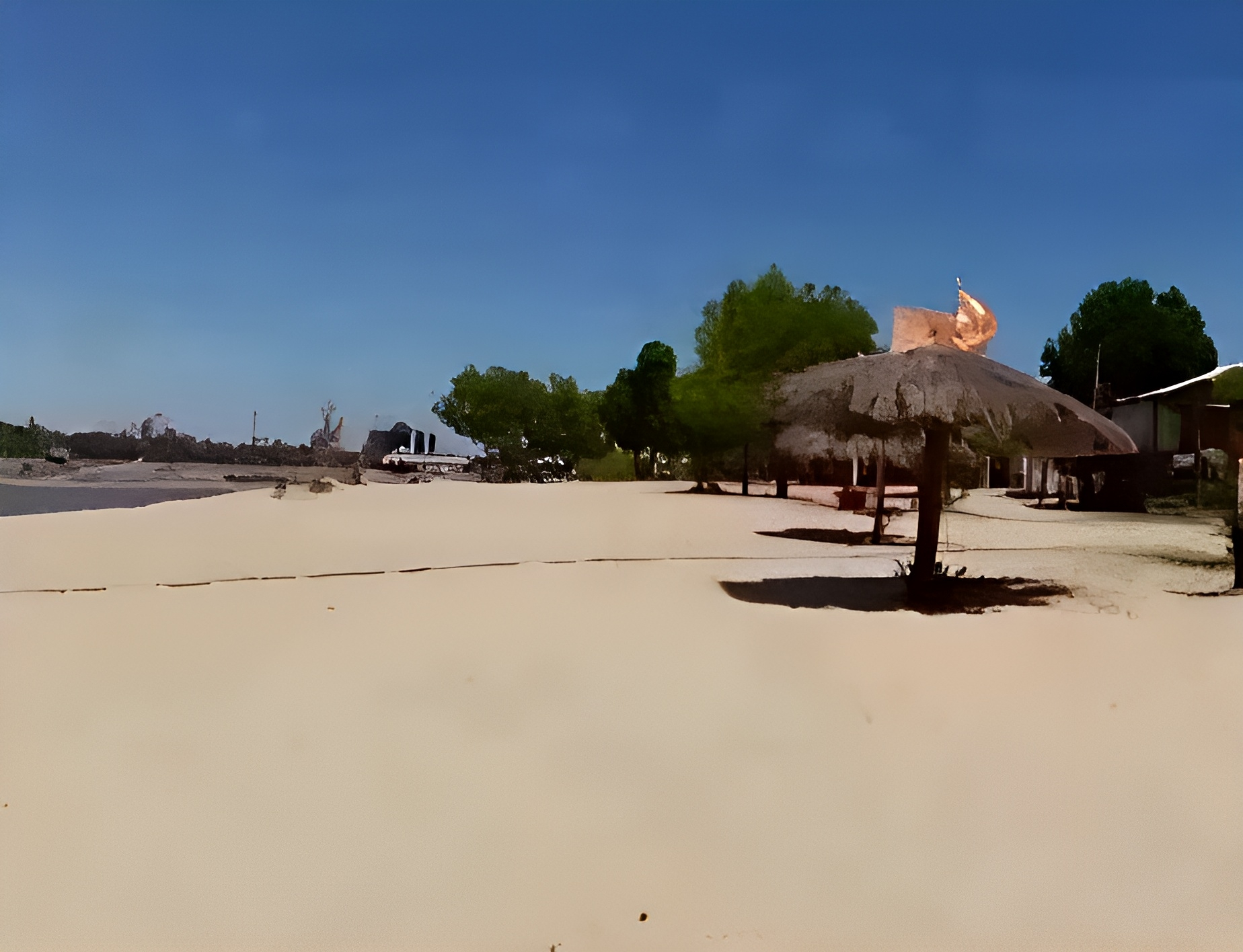
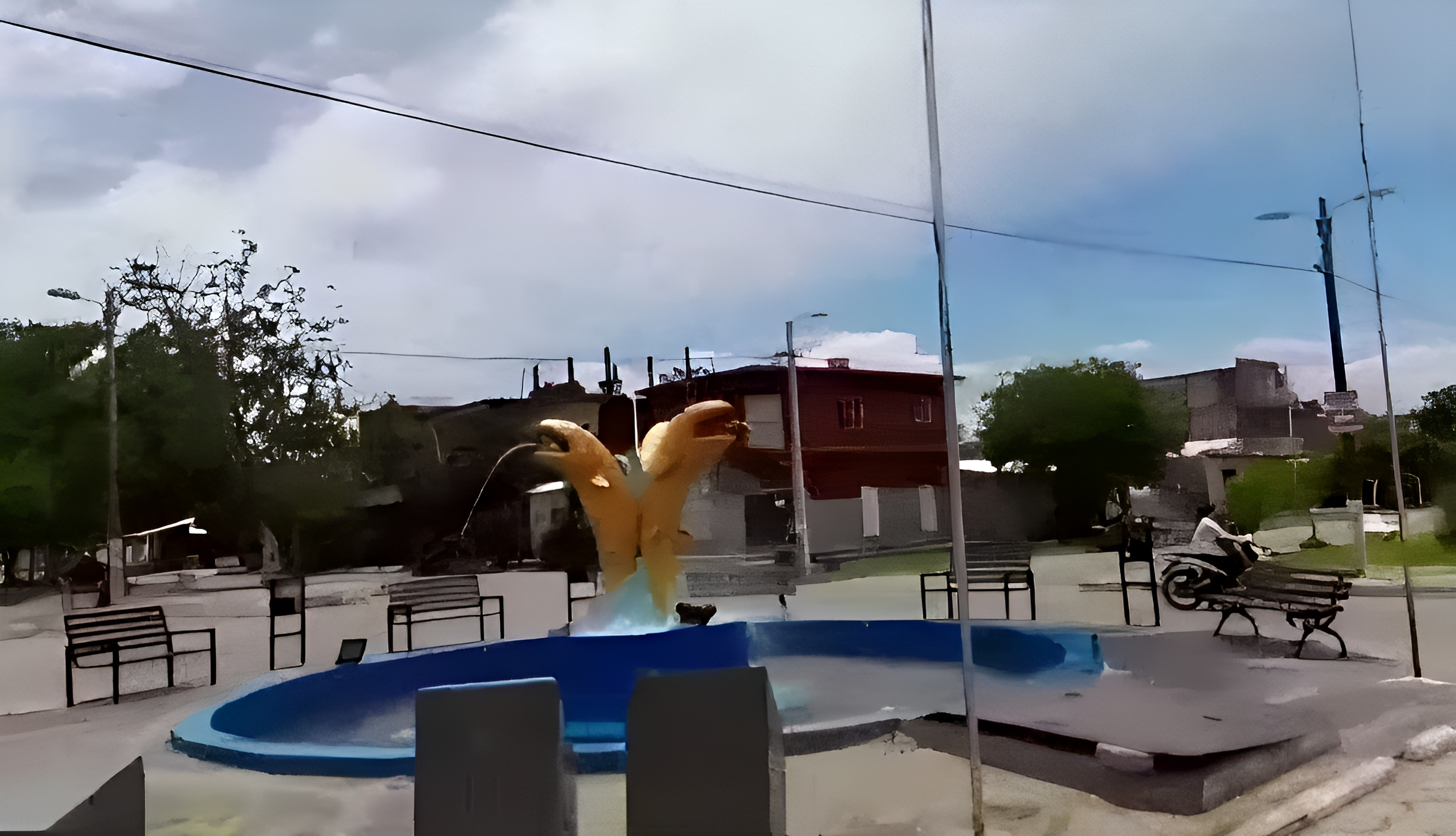
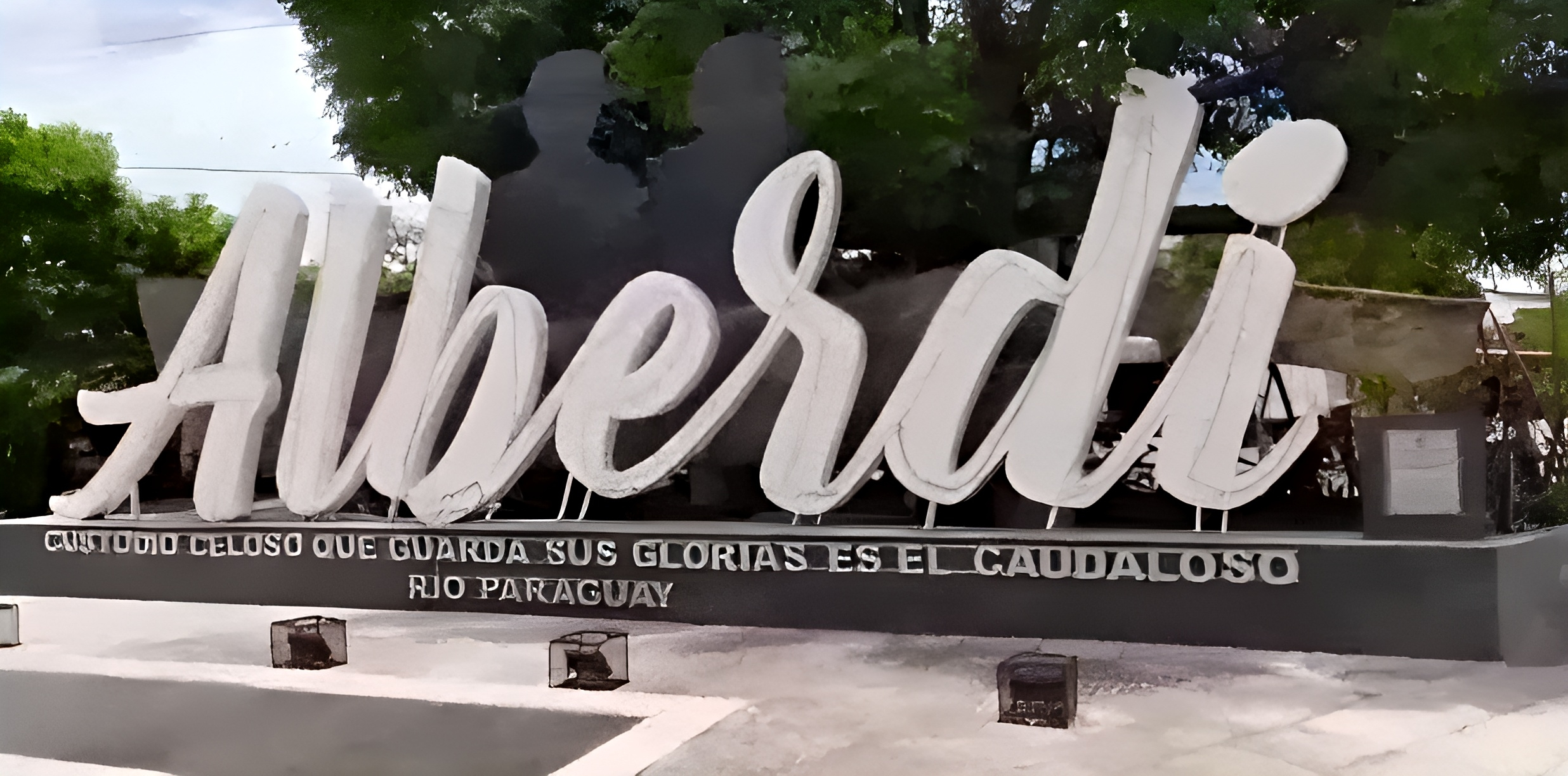
- Clockwise from the top: The city view of Alberdi, the Alberdi city sign, a square in the city featuring the locally abundant Dorado fish and the Punta Arena Beach, in Alberdi, Paraguay

- Location within Paraguay
- Coordinates: 26°11′24″S 58°7′48″W
- Country: Paraguay
- Department: Ñeembucú
- Elevation: 45 m (148 ft)

Population (2021)
  - Total: 9,679

Alberdi is a town in the Ñeembucú department of Paraguay. It is 144 km (89 mi) south of the capital city, Asunción. As of 2021, the population of Alberdi is 9,679.

== History ==
Alberdi was founded on 29 August 1930 under president José Patricio Guggiari. The town was named after Juan Bautista Alberdi, an Argentine diplomat and writer who voiced his support of Paraguay during the Paraguayan War.

== Geography ==
Alberdi is located along the Paraguay River in northern Ñeembucú, a department in southeast Paraguay. It is neighbored by the Paraguayan towns of Villa Oliva to the north and Villa Franca to the south, as well as the city of Formosa, Argentina across the Paraguay River to the west.

Most of the town is located within the region of Lake Ypoá, which is marked by landscapes of estuaries, streams and rivers that contribute to the region's cool and humid climate. Many of the riparian areas of Alberdi are prone to significant flooding following periods of heavy rain.

== Demographics ==
Alberdi, Ñeembucú, Paraguay Population Breakdown
Census Year	Pop.	Male	Female	Ages 0-14	Ages 15-29	Ages 30-44	Ages 45-59	Ages 60-74	Ages 75+
2002	7,717	51.0%	49.0%	31.5%	25.5%	18.2%	13.7%	7.9%	3.2%
2012	8,717	50.5%	49.5%	26.6%	25.7%	19.2%	15.6%	9.4%	3.6%

According to the department of Ñeembucú, Alberdi's 2021 population of 9,679 accounted for 11% of the department's total population. Alberdi is the second most populated city behind Pilar, the department’s capital.

== Economy ==
=== Commerce destination ===
Being at the Argentina–Paraguay border, a popular characteristic of the town is its commerce with the Argentine city of Formosa, which sits across the river. A large number of Argentines travel through the Formosa-Alberdi Port in order to shop for merchandise, mainly electronics and clothing, in Alberdi due to prices being markedly lower than those found in Argentina. The local Alberdi municipality encourages the activity and assists in organizing travel to and from Formosa by offering speedboats to shuttle tourists across the Paraguay River every half hour, as the Villeta–Alberdi–Pilar Route passes through the city.

=== Agriculture ===
In addition to commercial tourism, Alberdi relies to a lesser extent on agriculture and fishing. The primary crops are cassava, lettuce, and squash.

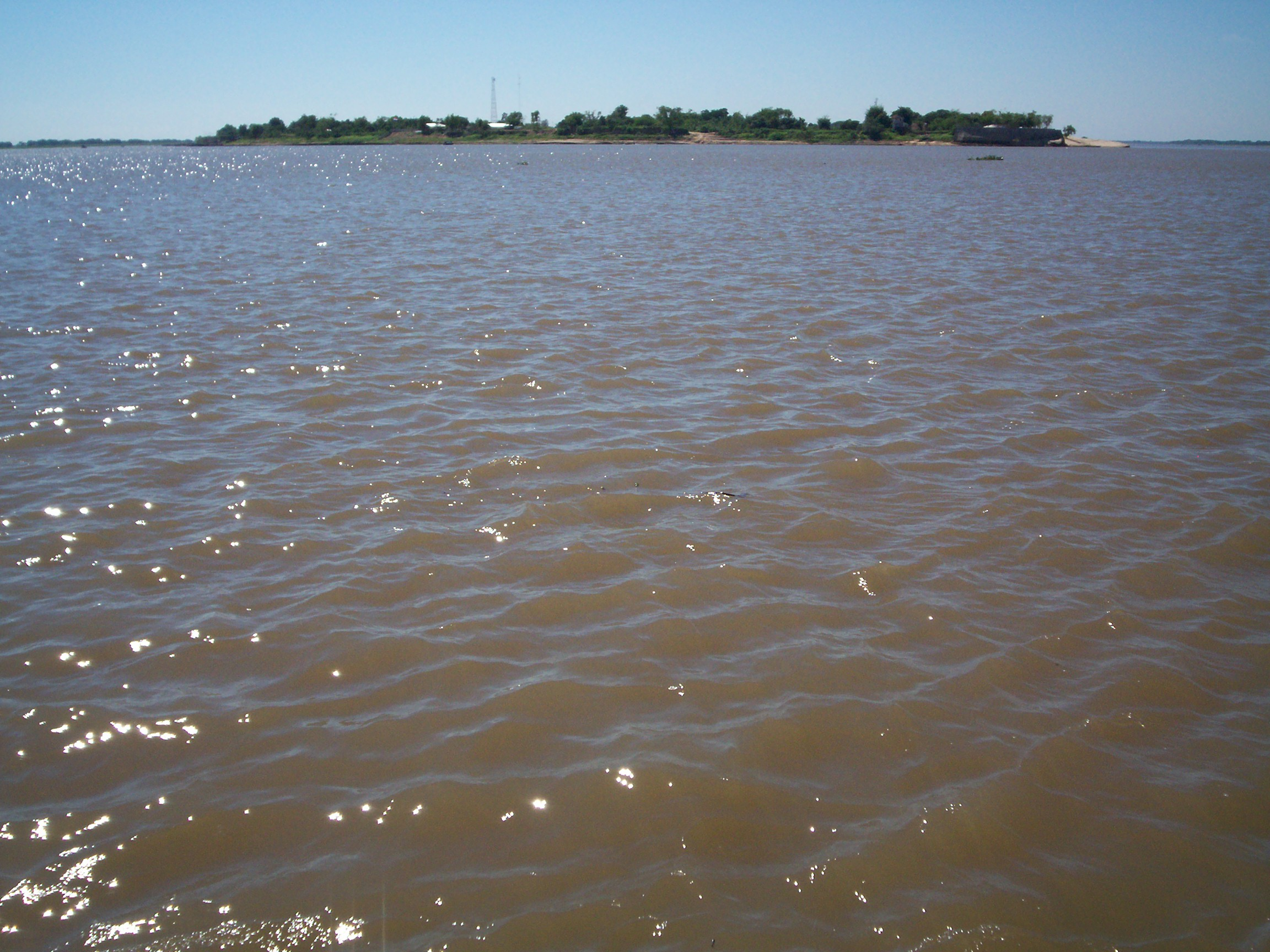
Alberdi, Paraguay seen from Argentina

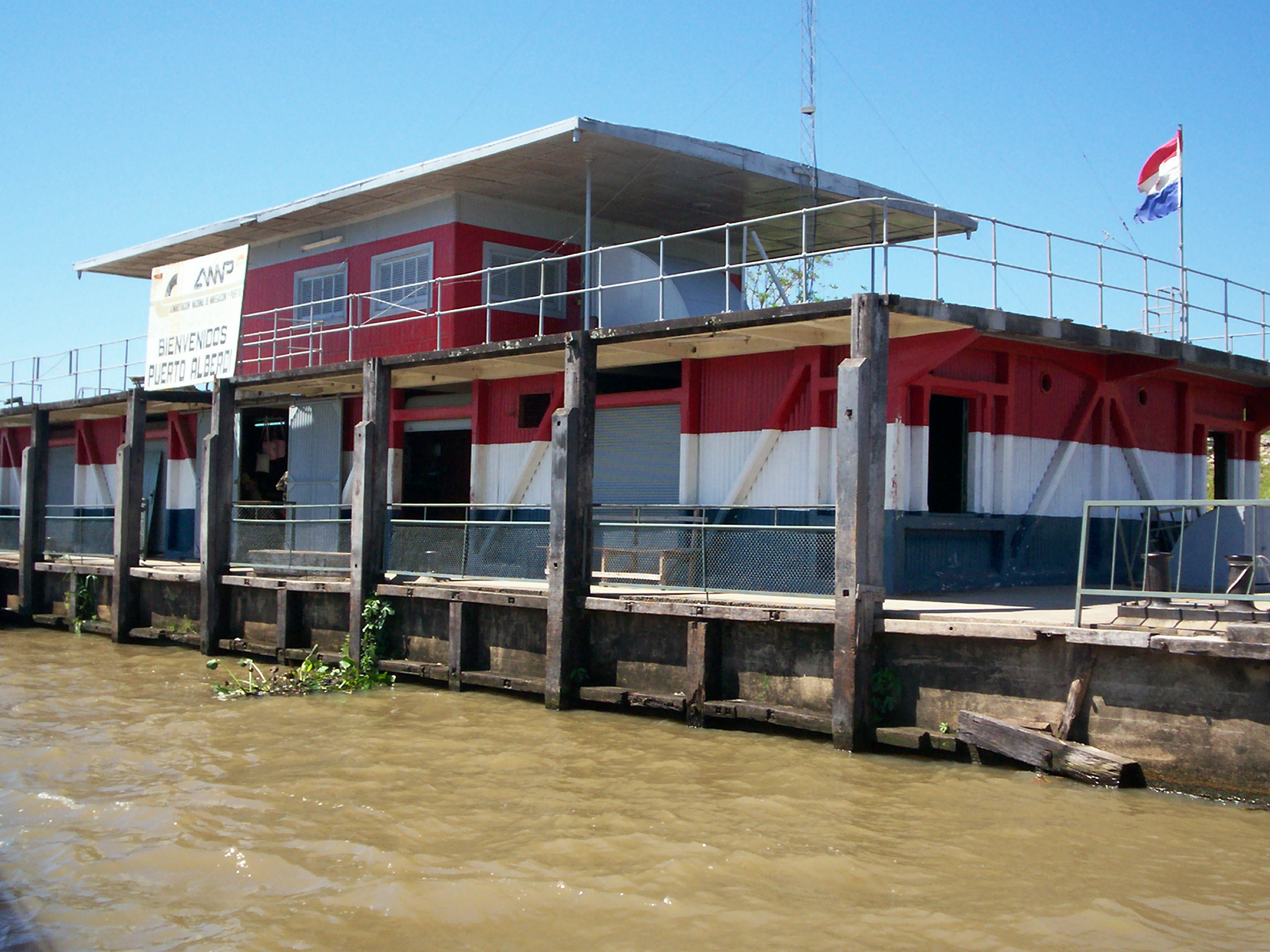
The port of Alberdi, Paraguay

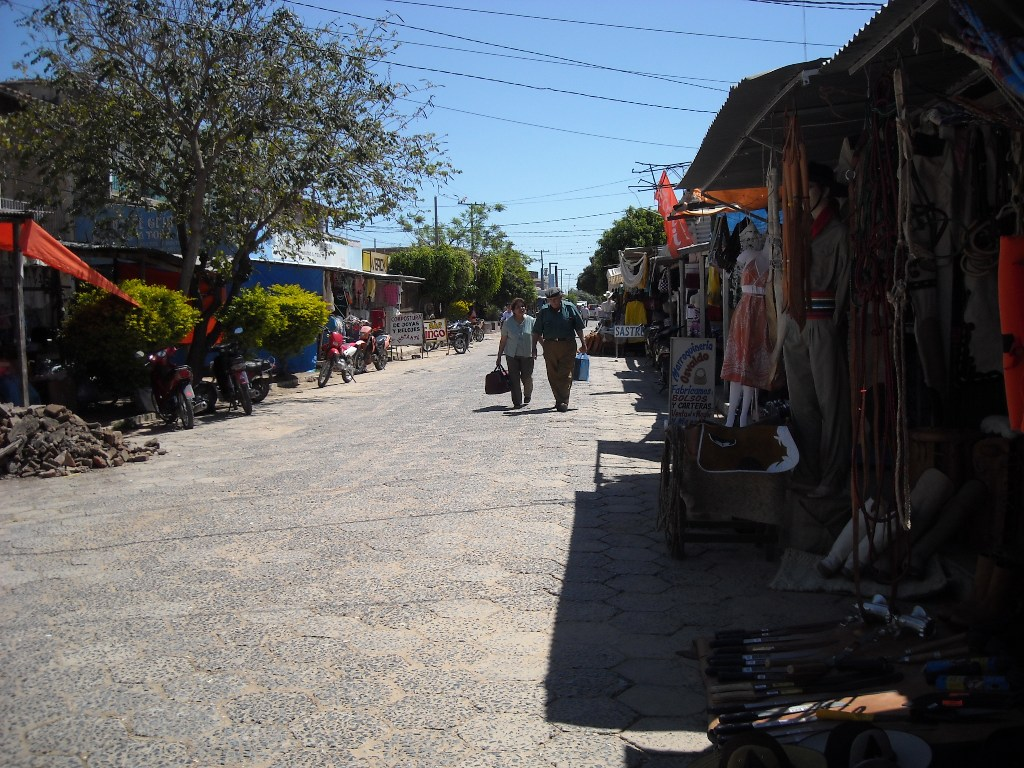
Alberdi, Paraguay

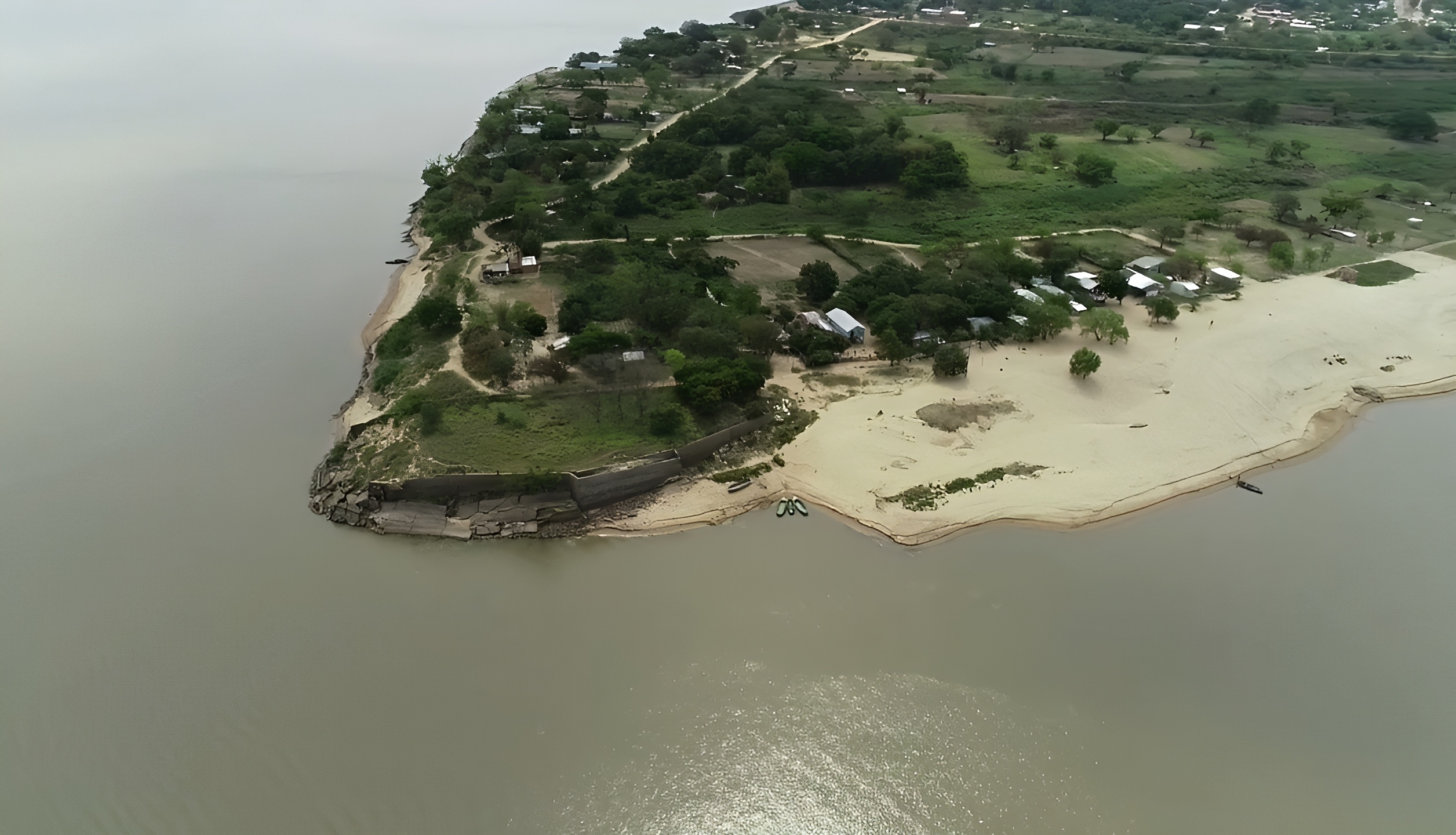
Punta Arena beach, in Alberdi, Paraguay

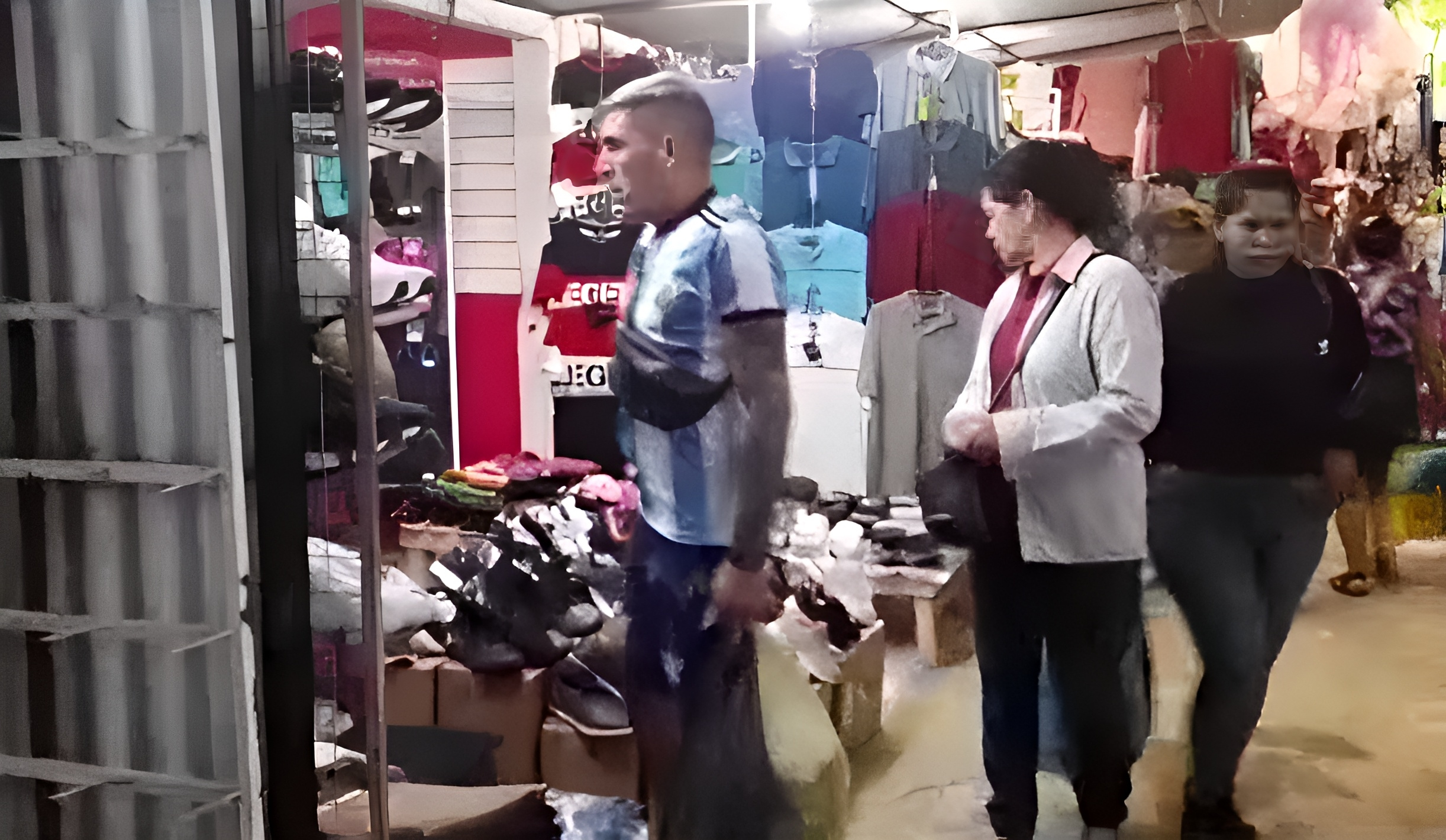
Alberdi, Paraguay

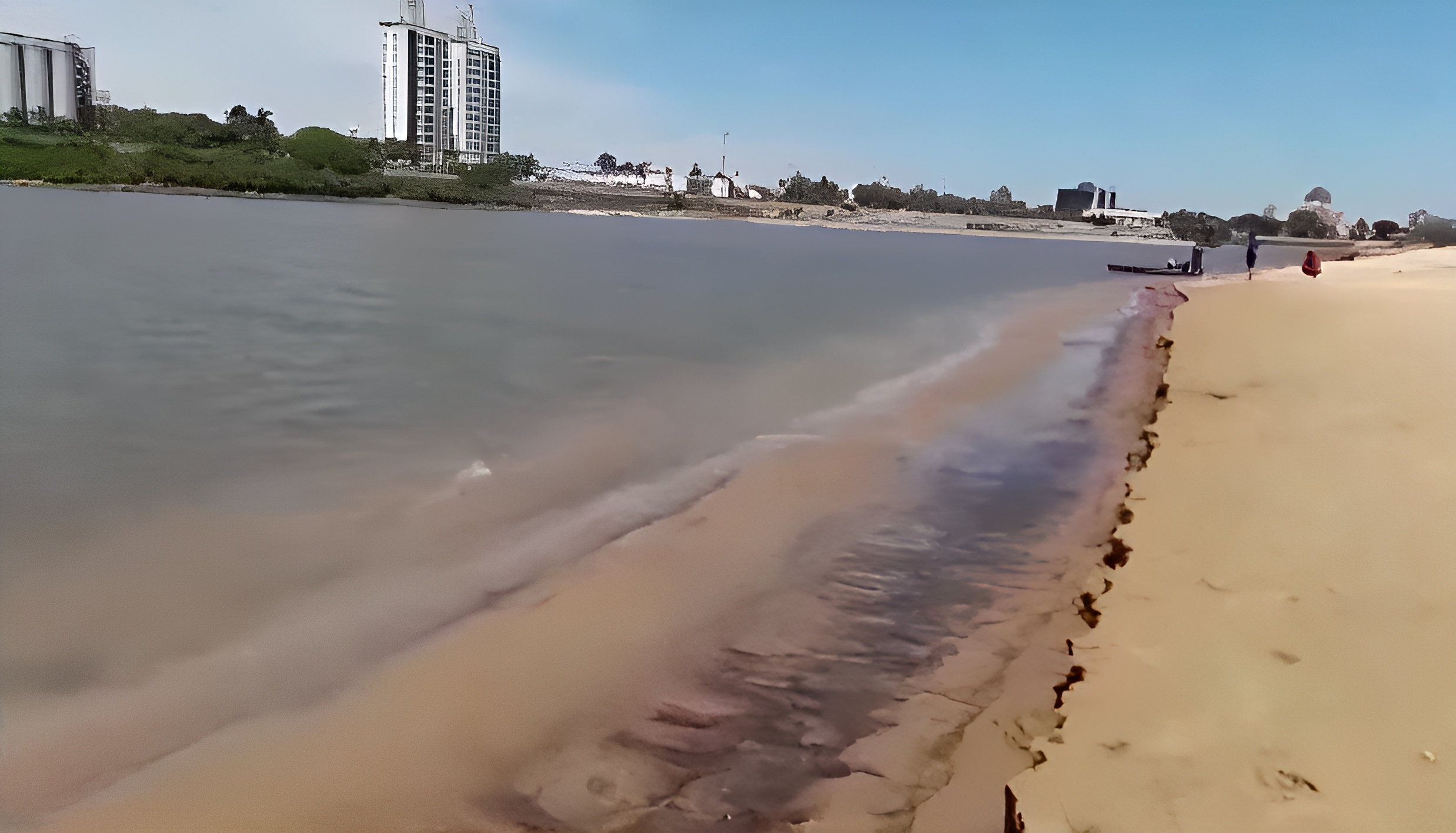
Punta Arena beach, in Alberdi, Paraguay

== Notable people ==
- Carlos Federico Abente (Guaraní poet)
- Demetrio Ortiz (composer)
