= Humaitá =

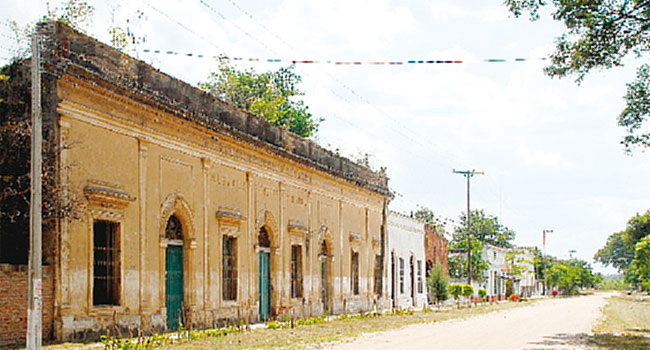
- Colonial houses in Humaitá

- Location within Paraguay
- Coordinates: 27°04′06″S 58°30′31″W
- Country: Paraguay
- Department: Ñeembucú
- Founder: February 1778 Pedro Melo de Portugal

Government
  - Intendente Municipal: Federico Cáceres Delgado

Area
  - Total: 389 km^{2} (150 sq mi)
- Elevation: 44 m (144 ft)

Population (2008)
  - Total: 3,214
  - Density: 8/km^{2} (21/sq mi)
- Time zone: -4 Gmt
- Postal code: 2840

Humaitá is a town and district in southern Paraguay. On the east bank of the Paraguay River, it is 275km south of the capital Asunción.

In the immediate vicinity was the Fortress of Humaitá, a major defensive site commanding a bend in the river and barring the way to Asunción. During much of the Paraguayan War it served as the main Paraguayan stronghold. Up to 24,000 troops were based there, as was the country's president Francisco Solano López. In the siege of Humaitá the fortress held up the enemy advance for more than two years; the defenders were reduced to near starvation. It fell on 25 July 1868 and was razed to the ground pursuant to the Treaty of the Triple Alliance.

The most important remaining structure is the church of San Carlos de Borromeo, which served the garrison, and was ruined beyond repair by Brazilian naval gunfire. Remains of defensive earthworks are within visiting distance, as are some battlefields. The town is frequented by visitors interested in the zone's military history.

== Toponymy ==
Humaitá comes from the Guaraní words "yma" (meaning ancient) and "itá" (meaning stone).

== Geography ==
The predominant geography in the zone is a sheet of low areas, of whitish land, without prominent waviness. Due to the proximity of the Paraguay River, the increase of the waves overwhelms the whole bordering zone, therefore the geopolitical importance that the city had in the past.

=== Climate ===
The climate is subtropical, with temperatures reaching -2 °C in winter and 40 °C in the summer.

== History ==
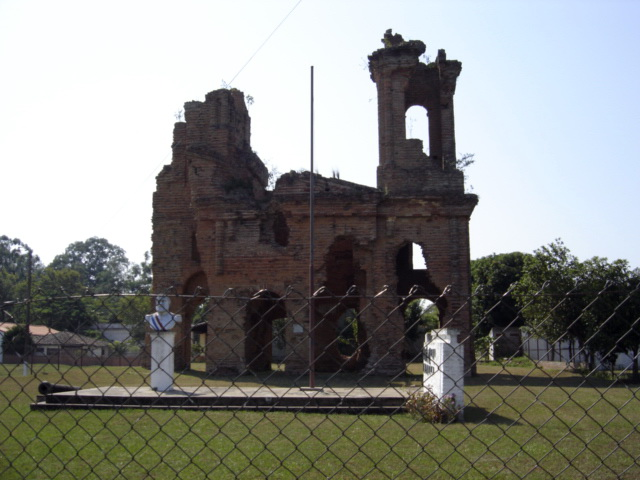
The ruined church of San Carlos de Borromeo, Humaitá, destroyed during the siege

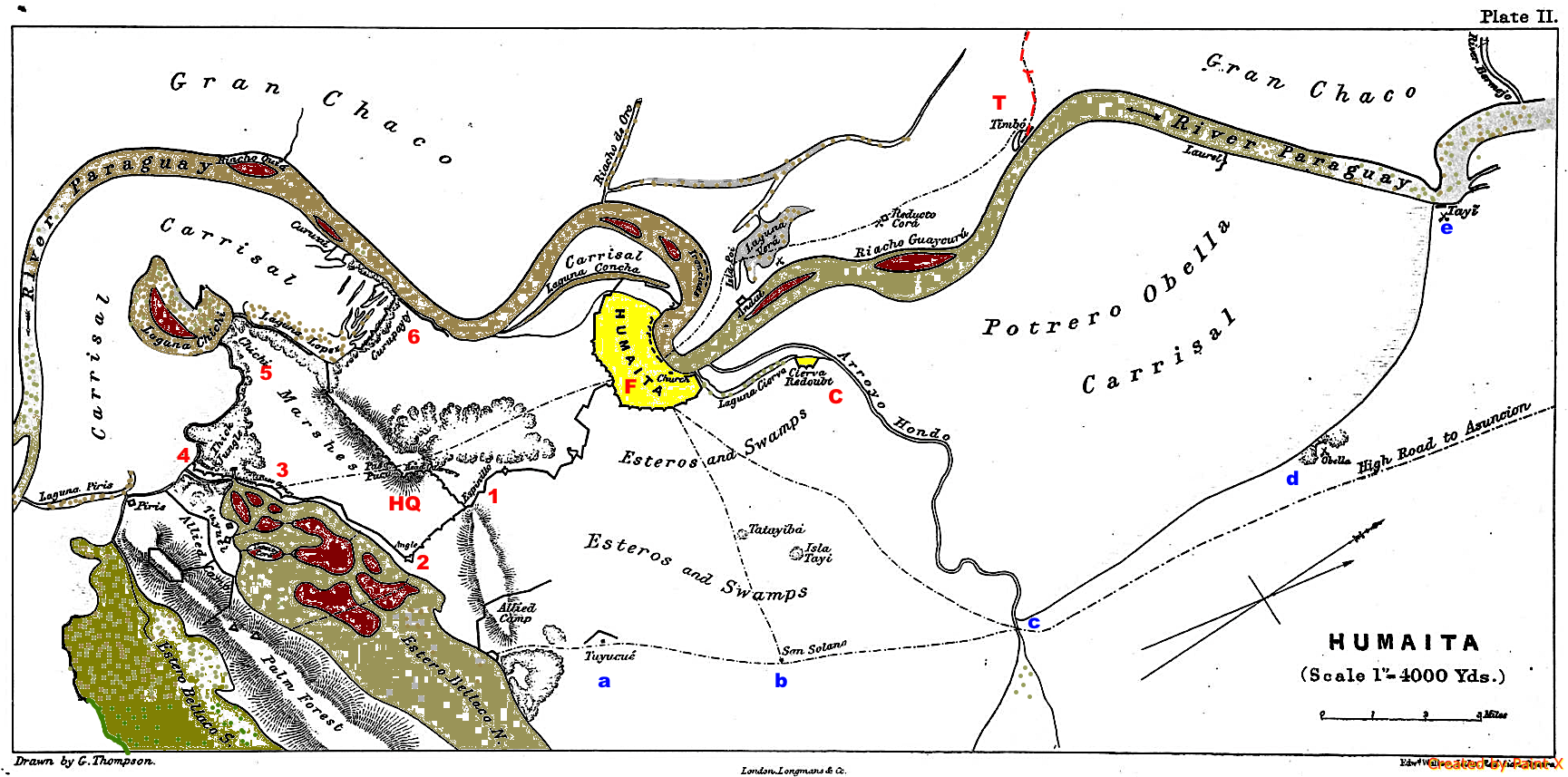
Position of the old Fortress of Humaitá.

The remains of the old fortress of Humaitá are located on the left side of the Paraguay River, approximately 430 km to the south of Asunción. During the Paraguayan War (1864–1870) this fortress was important because it controlled river access to the capital, Asunción.

The defenses of Humaitá were begun by Carlos Antonio López (1790–1862). The ruins of the church and possibly the town museum are the only remains of the installation.

== Economy ==
The inhabitants fish, raise cattle, and practice small-scale agriculture.

Local crafts include vases, gauntlets, pictures in burlap, and articles made from vegetable sponges. Carpets, tapestries, tablecloths, and crocheted apparel are also produced.

== Transportation ==
Humaitá may be reached via Route 1 from Asunción, after reaching San Ignacio, take the detour to Pilar. Humaitá also may be reached through the new Villeta–Alberdi–Pilar Route.

One may also take the bus from Asunción to Pilar and transfer to an interurban bus that serves Humaitá.

== Patrimony ==
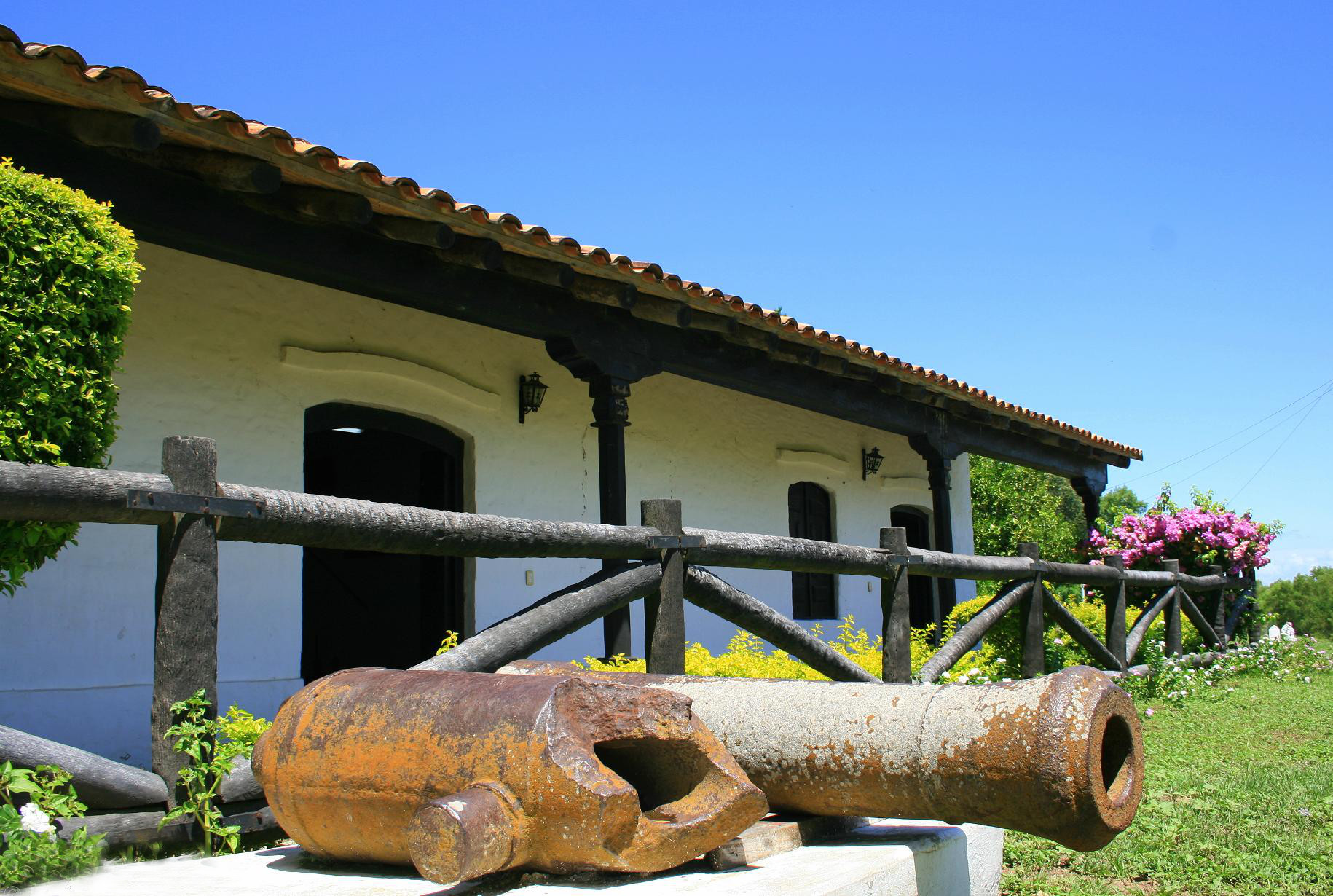
Cuartel de López

The city has a rich historical patrimony. Humaitá was more involved than any other city in the Paraguayan War. The Paraguayan army used this city to contain the invasion by the Alliance. By the end of the war, the city had been wrecked by the invading troops.

The Cuartel de López, a museum in Francisco Solano López's former barracks, has three rooms where bullets, cannons, stirrups, spurs, swords, and other battlefield relics are displayed.

== Tourism ==
Many tourists visit Humaitá. Students from all over Paraguay come to view the vestiges of the Paraguayan War, as do Uruguayan, Brazilian, Paraguayan and Argentine military men and civilians from throughout America and Europe.

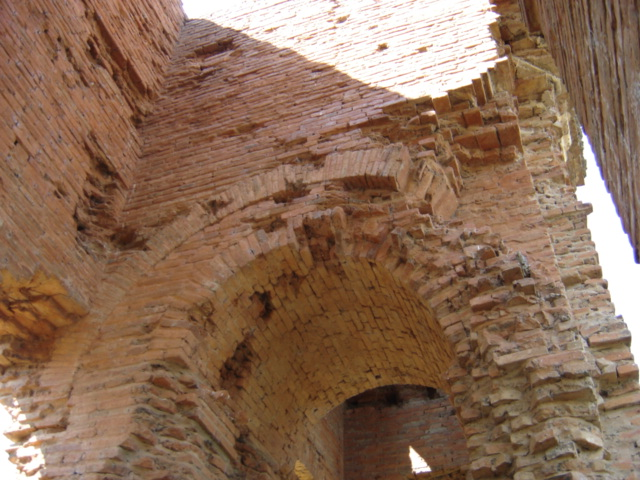
Ruins of church of Humaitá, detail

- Ruins of Humaitá. Only a few vestiges survived bombardment by enemy cannons during the war. One of these was San Carlos Borromeo's church. Carlos Antonio López ordered its construction. It was inaugurated on January 1, 1861. At the time, it was considered one of the most beautiful in the Americas.
- Itapunta
- Curupayty
- Estero Bellaco

Hotels in the city include the Municipal Hotel, with Italianate architecture, constructed at the end of the 19th century. Many historians believe that Stroessner stayed there during the 1947 revolution.

== Fishing ==
Due to its location on the Paraguay River, Humaitá is also a popular place to fish. Fish such as Mandi'i, catfish, piranha, armado, duck, dorado, surubí, and pacú provide the main income of fishermen. Milanese surubí is a popular dish in local restaurants.

== Gallery ==
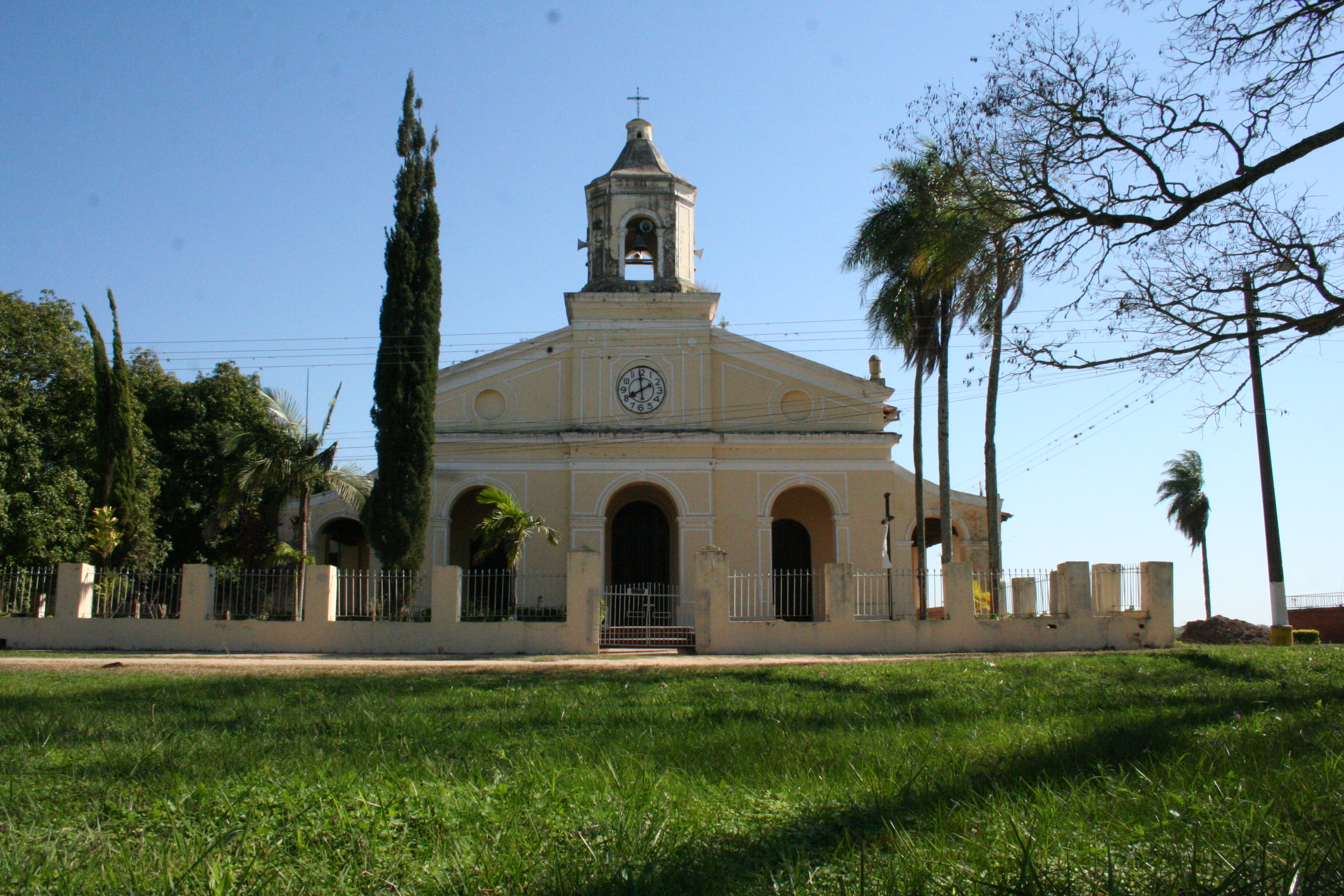
A local church in Humaitá

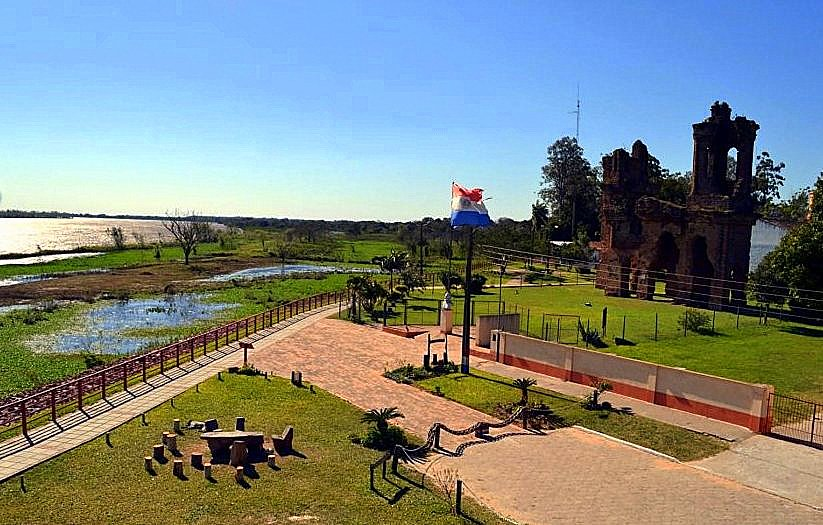
Humaitá, Paraguay

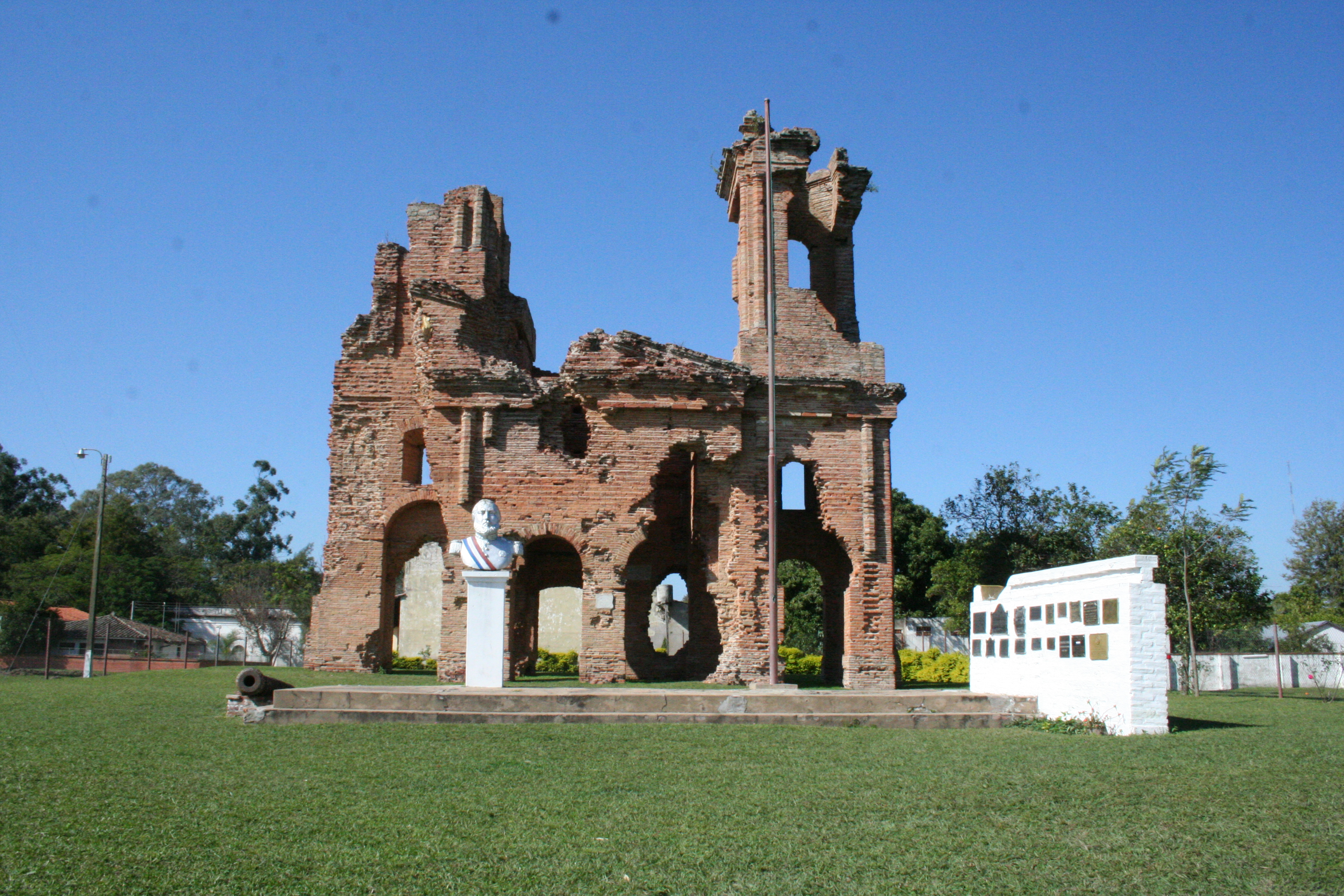
Humaitá, Paraguay

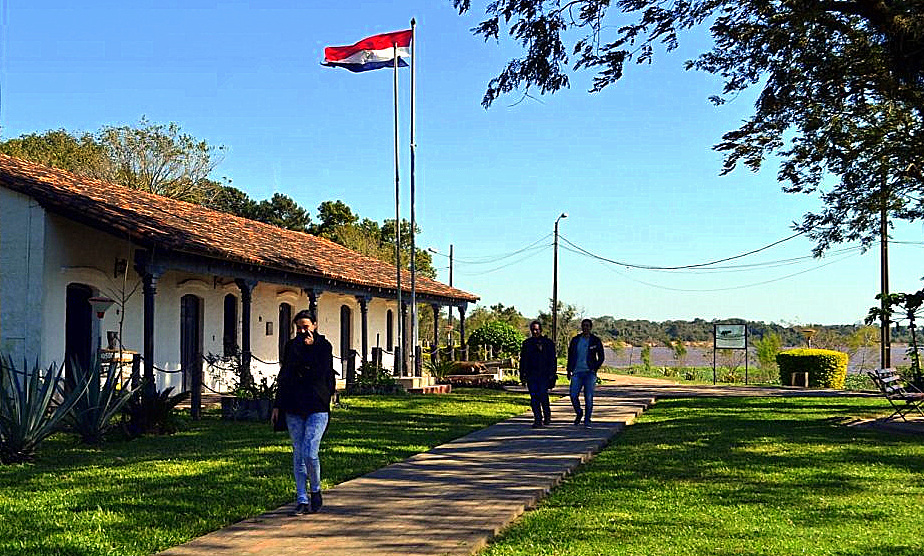
Humaitá, Paraguay

== Twin towns ==
Humaitá is twinned with:

- Malbrán, Argentina

== Sources ==
- World Gazeteer: Paraguay – World-Gazetteer.com * Revista Zeta
