= Battle of Laguna Sirena =

Part of the Paraguayan War

- Part of the Humaitá campaign
Date	April 17, 1866
Location	Laguna Sirena, Paso de Patria, Paraguay
Result	Brazilian victory

Belligerents
Empire of Brazil	Paraguay

Commanders and leaders
Manuel Luís Osório; Jacinto Machado	Basílio Benitez

Strength
10,000 soldiers	4,000 soldiers

Casualties and losses
337 casualties	500 casualties

The Battle of Laguna Sirena took place in the Paraguayan War, on April 17, 1866, close to Paso de Patria, between Brazilians and Paraguayans.

== The Battle ==
Brazilian general Manuel Luís Osório, accompanied by eleven soldiers, wanted to be the first ally to set foot in Paraguay. After him, troops from the 2nd Volunteers of the Homeland, 11th Line and from the division of commander Alexandre Gomes de Argolo Ferrão Filho also entered the region. The lagoon was located near Passo da Patria, between the confluences of the Paraná and Paraguay rivers. The night before the main battle, about 2,000 Paraguayan soldiers showed up, and Brazilian forces, who were setting up camp, managed to attack and drive them away. After this confrontation, the imperials believed that the Paraguayans would carry out a counterattack.

In the early hours of April 17, 3,200 or 4,000 Paraguayan soldiers, under the command of Colonel Basílio Benitez, returned and attacked Brazilian forces. Osório already foresaw the attack, and had organized the defense with troops from the 1st Division. At the beginning of the combat, the general sent Colonel Jacinto Machado and, with two battalions, flanked the Paraguayan columns that changed the position of the attack. Taking advantage of this change, Osório ordered a bayonet charge on the enemy, who retreated and suffered the loss of 500 men, including dead and wounded, two pieces of artillery and a flag. The Brazilians had 337 casualties.
