= Route 1 (Paraguay) =

Major road in Paraguay

National Route 01
- Ruta nacional PY01
- Mcal. Francisco Solano López
- PY01 highlighted in red

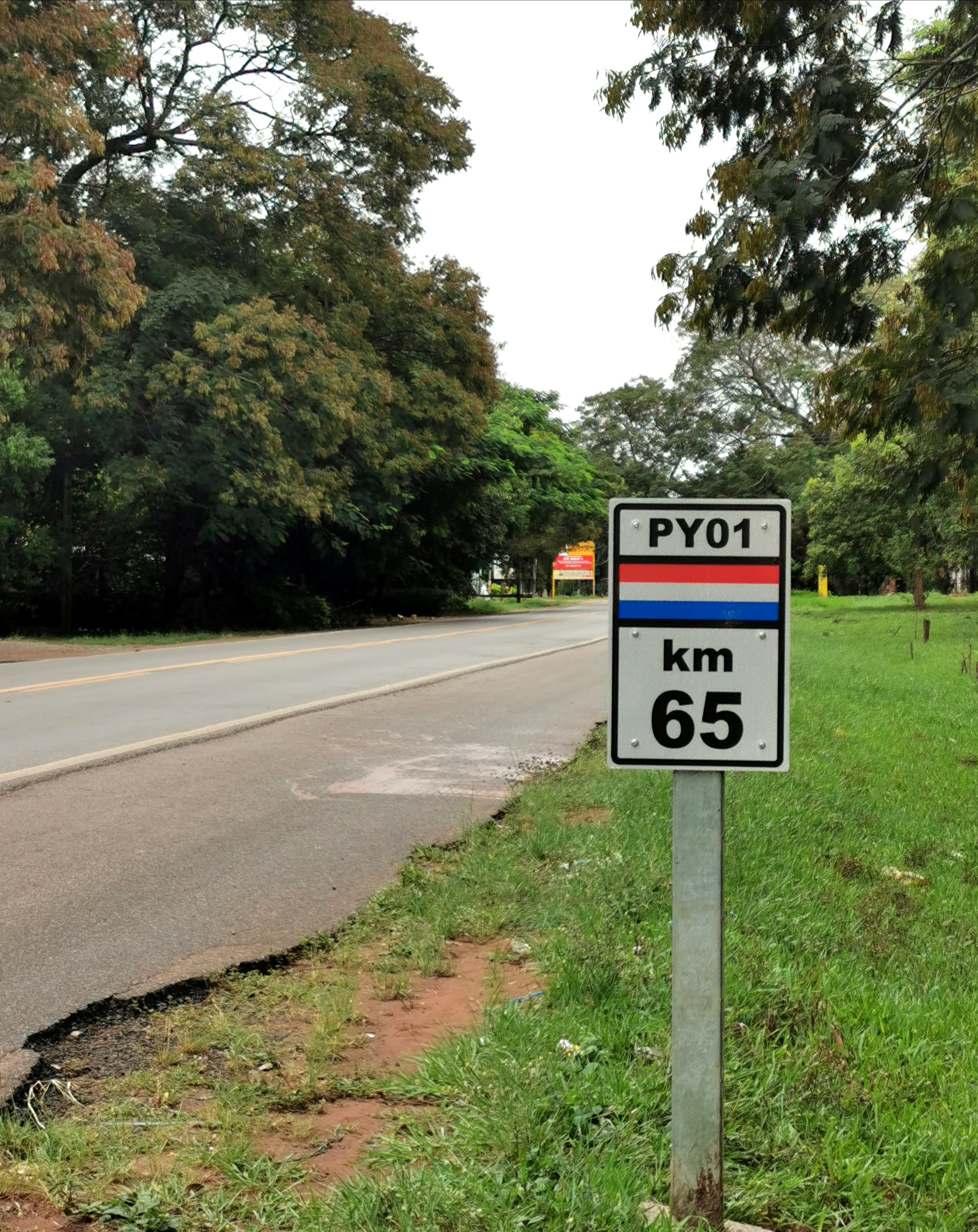
- PY01 sign near the city of Paraguarí.

Route information
- Length: 382 km (237 mi)

Major junctions
- North end: Asunción
- PY10 in Paraguarí, PI PY18 in Carapeguá, PI; PY04 in San Ignacio, MS; PY20 in San Patricio, MS; PY08 in Coronel Bogado, IT PY06 in Encarnación, IT
- South end: Encarnación

Location
- Country: Paraguay

Highway system
- Highways in Paraguay

National Route 1 (officially PY01, in Spanish, Ruta Nacional Número 1, or simply Ruta Uno) is one of the most important and one of the first highways in Paraguay, which runs from the capital city, Asunción to Itapua Department's capital, Encarnación. It crosses the Central, Paraguarí, Misiones and Itapua departments. It starts on the National Pantheon of the Heroes, and ends at the San Roque González de Santa Cruz Bridge, on the Paraná River, traversing 382 km (237 mi).

== Distances and important cities ==
The following table shows the distances traversed by PY01 in each different department, and important cities that it passes by (or near).

| Km | City | Department | Junctions/Tolls |
|---|---|---|---|
| 0 | Asunción | Capital District | |
| 8 | Villa Elisa/Fernando de la Mora | Central | |
| 13 | Ñemby/San Lorenzo | Central | |
| 19 | San Antonio | Central | |
| 23 | Ypané | Central | |
| 30 | Guarambaré | Central | |
| 37 | Itá | Central | |
| 48 | Yaguarón | Paraguarí | |
| 69 | Paraguarí | Paraguarí | PY10 |
| 83 | Carapeguá | Paraguarí | PY18 |
| 95 | San Roque G. de Santa Cruz | Paraguarí | |
| 109 | Quiindy | Paraguarí | |
| 138 | Caapucú | Paraguarí | |
| 160 | Villa Florida | Misiones | |
| 178 | San Miguel | Misiones | |
| 196 | San Juan Bautista | Misiones | |
| 224 | San Ignacio | Misiones | PY04 |
| 243 | Santa Rosa | Misiones | |
| 252 | San Patricio | Misiones | PY20 |
| 288 | General Delgado | Itapúa | |
| 320 | Coronel Bogado | Itapúa | PY08/ |
| 330 | Carmen del Paraná | Itapúa | |
| 365 | San Juan del Paraná | Itapúa | |
| 382 | Encarnación | Itapúa | PY06 |
