= Modesto Sandoval =

Paraguayan footballer (1941–2023)

Modesto Sandoval (12 February 1941 – 27 May 2023) was a Paraguayan football player and coach who played as a goalkeeper.

== Playing career ==
Sandoval initiated his career in the Club Sportivo Luqueño from 1960 to 1964 having a lot of spectacular saves when he played for the inferiors and a good future for his career. After his great reputation in Luque he was sent to the Club Nacional neighborhood of Barrio Obrero (Asunción) from 1965 to 1968.

Then he passed to Venezuela in the Club Deportivo Galicia from 1969 to 1972 where he won his first title. After his good saves and unmatchable skills he was bought and transferred to the Deportivo Italia where he just played on the year of 1973 and won his second title. And his last and most successful club was in the Estudiantes de Mérida FC from 1974 to 1979 where he was once more champion at the Copa de Venezuela in 1975.

== Coaching career ==
After his professional career, Sandoval trained a lot of notable goalkeepers in different clubs. He still trained goalkeepers and worked in Cerro Porteño. The most notable are Sergio Goycochea, Faryd Aly Mondragón both in Cerro Porteño, Jose Luis Chilavert in Sportivo Luqueño and Justo Villar in Sol de America and in the Club Libertad. Sandoval is the only trainer that until now formed and trained in youth the three national team goalkeepers of Paraguay, Justo Villar, Aldo Bobadilla, and Diego Barreto. Another notable experience of Sandoval was in the qualifying round for the 1982 Spain soccer World Cup where he trained Ever Hugo Almeida, Roberto Fernández, and Manuel Battaglia.

Goalkeepers he trained from youth level:

Paraguay

- Diego Barreto
- Roberto Junior Fernández
- Justo Villar
- Jose Luis Chilavert
- Danilo Aceval
- Aldo Bobadilla

Goalkeepers he trained:

Argentina

- Sergio Goycochea
- Ezequiel Medrán
- Hilario Navarro

Colombia

- Faryd Aly Mondragón

== Death ==
Sandoval died on 27 May 2023, at the age of 82.

== Honours ==
Champion with the Deportivo Galicia in 1969, Deportivo Italia in 1972, and Estudiantes de Mérida FC in 1975.
