= San Miguel, Paraguay =

San Miguel San Miguel
- Location within Paraguay
- Coordinates: 27°24′0″S 57°8′24″W
- Country: Paraguay
- Department: Misiones

Population (2002)
  - Total: 5,253

San Miguel is one of the ten districts of the Misiones Department in Paraguay. San Miguel is known as the Wool Capital.

== Geography ==
San Miguel is located 178 km south from Asunción, the capital city of Paraguay. it is reached by Route Number 1 from Asuncion.

== Sources ==
- World Gazeteer: Paraguay – World-Gazetteer.com
