= Ranked list of Paraguayan departments =

Population figures from the 2022 Census by the INE, the National Statistics Institute.

== By population ==
Rank	Department	Population (2022)	%
1	Central	1,866,562	30.55%
2	Alto Paraná	784,839	12.85%
3	Asunción	477,346	7.82%
4	Itapúa	436,966	7.15%
5	Caaguazú	430,142	7.04%
6	San Pedro	341,895	5.6%
7	Cordillera	271,475	4.45%
8	Concepción	204,536	3.35%
9	Paraguarí	199,430	3.27%
10	Canindeyú	189,128	3.1%
11	Guairá	180,121	2.95%
12	Amambay	173,770	2.84%
13	Caazapá	140,060	2.29%
14	Presidente Hayes	126,880	2.07%
15	Misiones	114,542	1.87%
16	Ñeembucú	85,749	1.4%
17	Boquerón	68,595	1.12%
18	Alto Paraguay	17,608	0.28%
	Paraguay	6,109,644	100%

== By area ==
Rank	Department	Area (km^{2})	%
1	Boquerón	91,699	22.5%
2	Alto Paraguay	82,349	20.2%
3	Presidente Hayes	72,907	17.9%
4	San Pedro	20,002	4.9%
5	Concepción	18,051	4.4%
6	Itapúa	16,525	4.1%
7	Alto Paraná	14,895	3.7%
8	Canindeyú	14,667	3.6%
9	Amambay	12,933	3.2%
10	Ñeembucú	12,147	3.0%
11	Caaguazú	11,474	2.8%
12	Misiones	9,556	2.3%
13	Caazapá	9,496	2.3%
14	Paraguarí	8,705	2.1%
15	Cordillera	4,948	1.2%
16	Guairá	3,846	0.9%
17	Central	2,465	0.6%
18	Asunción	117	0.0%
	Paraguay	406,752	100%

== By density ==
Rank	Department	Density
1	Asunción	4,453.9
2	Central	910.3
3	Cordillera	63.7
4	Guairá	59.8
5	Alto Paraná	56.5
6	Caaguazú	49.7
7	Itapúa	37.8
8	Paraguarí	29.9
9	San Pedro	22.0
10	Caazapá	20.5
11	Canindeyú	16.3
12	Concepción	14.3
13	Misiones	13.6
14	Amambay	13.5
15	Ñeembucú	7.5
16	Presidente Hayes	1.8
17	Boquerón	0.7
18	Alto Paraguay	0.2
	Paraguay	18.1

This is a list of regions of Paraguay by Human Development Index as of 2017.

Rank	Region	HDI (2017)
High human development
1	Central (Asunción, Central)	0.743
–	Paraguay	0.702
Medium human development
2	South-East (Guairá, Misiones, Paraguarí, Ñeembucú)	0.692
3	North-East (Caaguazú, Alto Paraná, Canindeyú)	0.679
4	South-West (Caazapá, Itapúa)	0.678
5	North-West (Boquerón, Alto Paraguay, Presidente Hayes, Concepción, Amambay, San Pedro, Cordillera)	0.674
