= Desmochados =

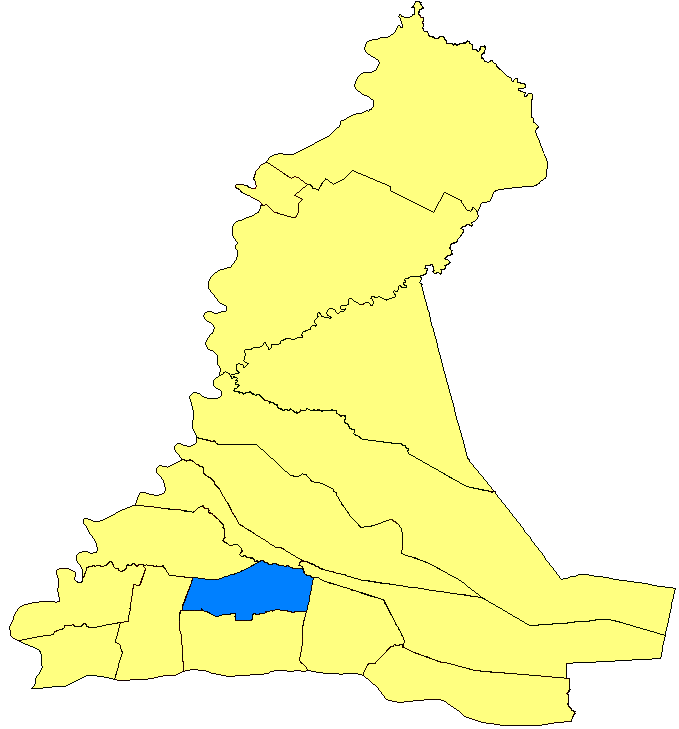

- Location within Paraguay
- Coordinates: 27°7′12″S 58°6′0″W
- Country: Paraguay
- Department: Ñeembucú

Population (2008)
  - Total: 252

Desmochados is a village in Paraguay, near the northern border of Argentina.

The population is about 250 people. Some nearby larger cities are:

- Corrientes (Argentina) 90 km (56 mi),
- Resistencia (Argentina) 105 km (65 mi),
- Pilar (Paraguay). 44 km (27 mi)

== Sources ==
- World Gazeteer: Paraguay – World-Gazetteer.com
