= Isla Umbú =

Isla Umbú Ypa'ũ Umbu
- Location within Paraguay
- Coordinates: 27°0′0″S 58°18′0″W
- Country: Paraguay
- Department: Ñeembucú
- Founded: Siglo XVIII

Government
  - Intendente Municipal: Silverio Romero Miranda.

Population (2008)
  - Total: 320 hab.
- Time zone: -4 Gmt
- Postal code: 2800

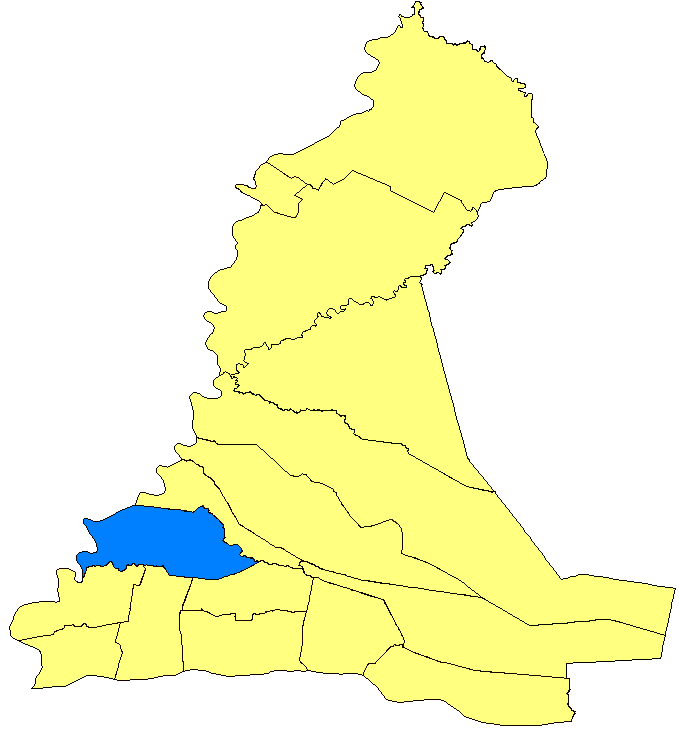

Isla Umbú (Guarani: Ypa'ũ Umbu) is a village in the Ñeembucú department of Paraguay, about 12 km south of Pilar. It is known as the watershed of dairy Ñeembucú.

== The people ==
There are 320 people (national census 2002).

At the entrance of the village there is a monument. Caters to the city of Pilar with some 3,000 liters of milk a day.

Isla Umbu was founded in 1860 by order of Don Carlos Antonio López in a quiet spot Ñeembucú, surrounded by swamps.

The streets of the city have a natural grass covering, which gives it a serene, very quiet with little vehicle traffic. These are motorcycles, horses and carts the most common means of locomotion flowing through the dirt roads.

On one side of the church is the block of buildings at the time was the founding Cabildo and then, Army barracks in campaign. At its construction and wood were used tacuara intertwined with strings of leather and mud. A few years ago, the house was restored and for the Historical Museum Cnel. Pedro Hermosa, in tribute to a former soldier of the War of 70.

History tells us that "After completing the Paraguayan War, Colonel Hermosa returned to this area and married Juanita Pesoa, the lover of Mariscal López.

Students receive education in the Elementary School No. 265 St. Athanasius, at the College National Contralmirante Ramon E. Martino and Center youth and adult education.

== Economy ==
The breeding of livestock and agricultural work are the main activities to those involved. People grow corn, cotton and vegetables. Also part of the economic items beekeeping and milk production that is traded on a daily basis with neighbor Pilar.

== History ==
In a document of the year 1785 slogan that Gov. Pedro Melo of Portugal ordered to Mr. Juan Jara of organizing the population of territorial space ranging from the Villa del Pilar, Curupayty up to prevent the entry of Indian infidels.

"We agreed to give each family free land, animals; certain amount of horses, cows and a few years grace in the payment of tithe. At that time they said Isla Umbú and a place in the not too distant already had a chapel that was called Lord's Chapel. It is assumed that the crucified Christ which is now located above the altar was the first patron saint of Isla Umbú, "explains.

== 19th century ==
Among sets of old houses is the greatest treasure Isla Umbú. It is the original church that was started lifting two years after the foundation, dated 1860. The book maintains the colonial-style architectural features of the 19th century: thick adobe walls and roof that mixes karanda'y, tacuarillas and tiles. Floors are made of brick and have a loft that serves to the choir. A large wooden cross solid times initial environmental input to the sacred enclosure, stored in its internal solemn airs. At the heart of the simple wooden altar, sits St. Athanasius. They say the voices popular that the holy warrior was appointed skipper of Isla Umbú following a request for help made by Marshal Francisco Solano López during the Paraguayan War (1864–1870).

On May 2, 1866, before the battle of Estero Bellaco, Marshal López made a promise to St. Athanasius, who earned if the confrontation, it would designate patron saint of the first church in Paraguay after completion of that event of war. And as it was, he was in appreciation for the triumph.

At the top of the altarpiece, which is also located carving of a crucified Christ, was recorded the Paraguayan national shield: the star among the palm and olive trees.

== Historical heritage and tourism ==
The Church: In 1970, became the first restoration work at the church. It replaced the old pieces of wood which were very damaged by the effects of time and termites. Also, a portion of the roof, especially on the altarpiece. Since then, the old buildings were declared historical and cultural heritage of the nation. The community, again placing the bell in its original place and redo the wood, as was the original. The community has an active participation in the preservation of historical heritage and tourist city.

The Historical Museum Isla Umbú was again restored and rehabilitated four years ago. A group of villagers were searching objects and relics to the acquis. They have done an awareness campaign through the radio program that the City has once a week in a transmitter of Pilar, for people who had some things related story done or provide the Commune order to expose the museum. People responded favorably. Many people approached their belongings familiar to assemble collections. It was a thorough job of go house to house across the district and so we were able to collect assets that today are on display.

In the halls of the museum can be seen from a trunk tajy hand carved, which was used by some families of the area as a water container and other times to save seed consumption, until wearing priests of the parish. There are old mess utensils, sewing machines, lamps, urns voting, trunks, coins and photos of veterans of the Chaco War (1932–1935).

In another room are located the remains of War 70: remnants of weapons, rifles, Yatagan, gun bullets, wheeled carts, running boards, found in Tajy and Boquerón, existing companies Umbu Island. It raises the curiosity of visitors a bed of iron, artistically worked, which belonged to Juanita Pesoa. And in the courtroom, which was supposed Marshal Lopez when she hosted the Intendant of the Army, Excel tables in oil signed by the painter Bartolome Martinez. In several paintings are scenes of bloody battles in some others women delivering their jewellery to Marshal, and portraits of Paraguayan hero, Madama Lynch and Pancha Garmendia.

- 'La Laguna Chapel' is located alongside the central sector of Isla Umbu, is an attractive area of distraction. With a privileged landscape gives clear water and green environment, steals the attention of holidaymakers during the season.

== Important festivals ==
During the patron festival of May 2, Isla Umbu was crowded. Returning villagers who emigrated in search of better employment alternatives in Asunción, Ciudad del Este, Pilar or Buenos Aires. And lately, some who went to Madrid (Spain). The celebrations are with "Torin", runs rings and installs the festival with the Carousel. There are fair foods, Bandita and great joy.

== Transportation ==
From Pilar, there is public transport every day.

== How to Get There ==
From Pilar is a 12 km, in a land route, which is empowered to vehicles of all kinds most of the year. Taking the main route south toward Humaitá, there is a no paved road to Isla Umbu.

== Sources ==
- World Gazeteer: Paraguay – World-Gazetteer.com
