= Laureles, Paraguay =

Laureles
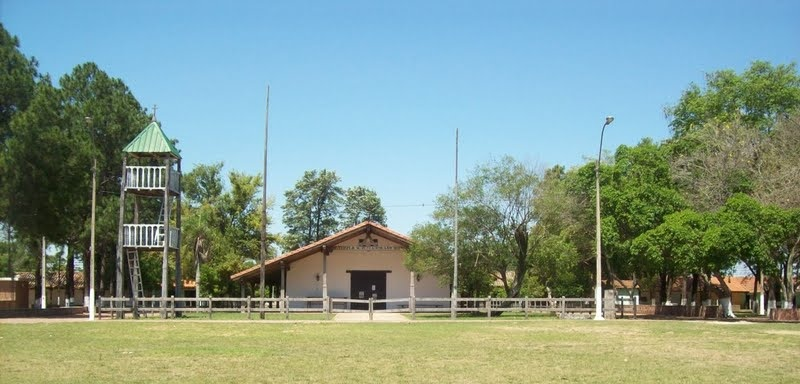
- Laureles

- Location within Paraguay
- Coordinates: 27°14′24″S 57°29′24″W
- Country: Paraguay
- Department: Ñeembucú

Population (2008)
  - Total: 777

Laureles is a town in the Ñeembucú department of Paraguay.

== Sources ==
- World Gazeteer: Paraguay – World-Gazetteer.com
