= General José Eduvigis Díaz =

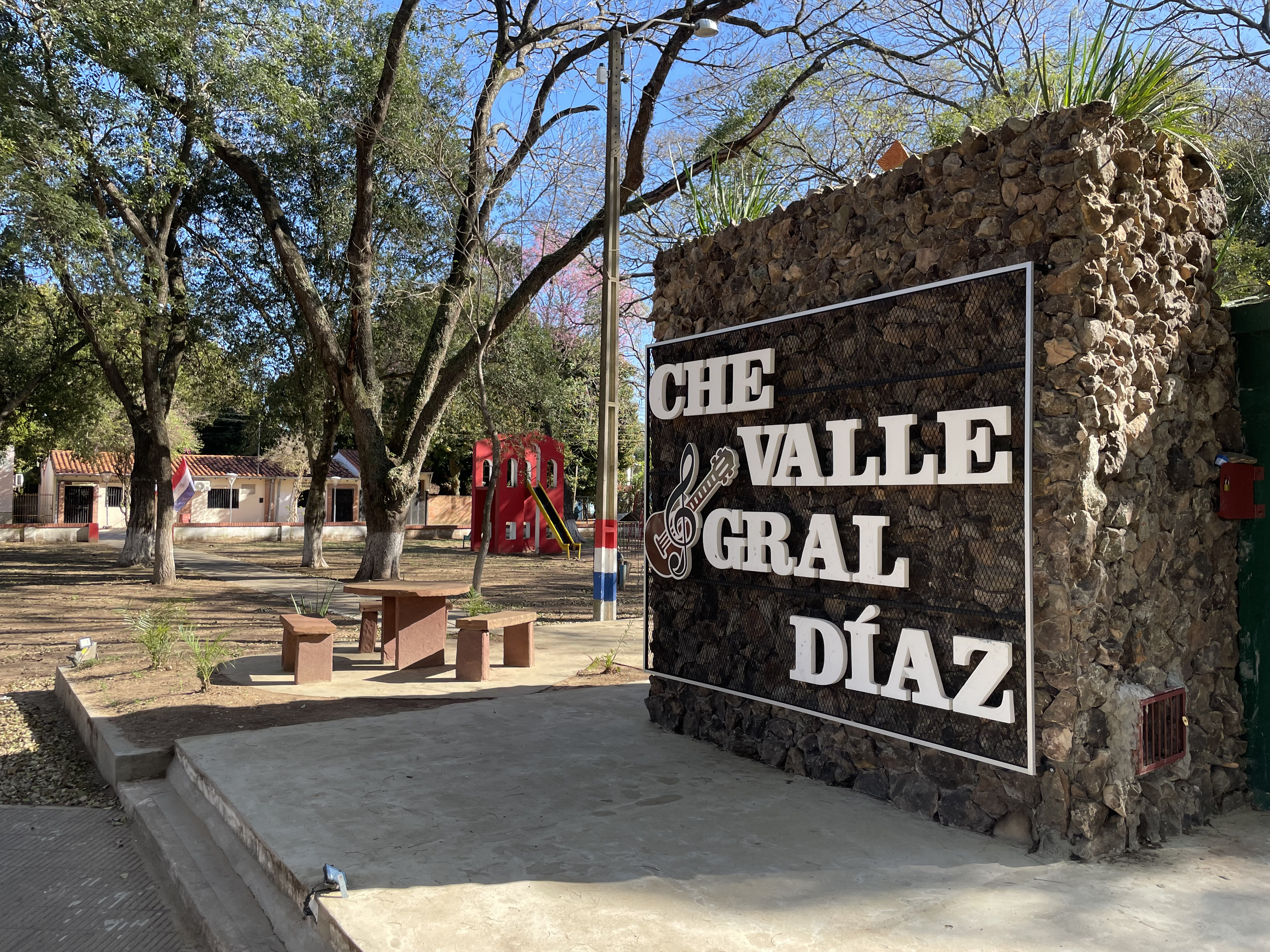
- Park and welcome sign in the town

- Location within Paraguay
- Coordinates: 27.200837°S 58.366660°W
- Country: Paraguay
- Department: Ñeembucú

Population (2008)
  - Total: 1 521

General José Eduvigis Díaz is a town in the Ñeembucú department of Paraguay.

== Sources ==
- World Gazeteer: Paraguay – World-Gazetteer.com
