= Yabebyry =

- Location within Paraguay
- Coordinates: 27°24′0″S 57°8′24″W
- Country: Paraguay
- Department: Misiones
- Founded: January 14, 1790

Government
  - Intendant: Ramón Anibal Allende Iseren ANR

Area
  - Total: 980 km^{2} (380 sq mi)

Population (2002)
  - Total: 2,851
  - Density: 2.95/km^{2} (7.6/sq mi)
- Area code: 072

Yabebyry is a town and distrito in the Misiones department of Paraguay.

== Sources ==
- Yabebyry: Paraguay
