= Mayor José de Jesús Martínez =

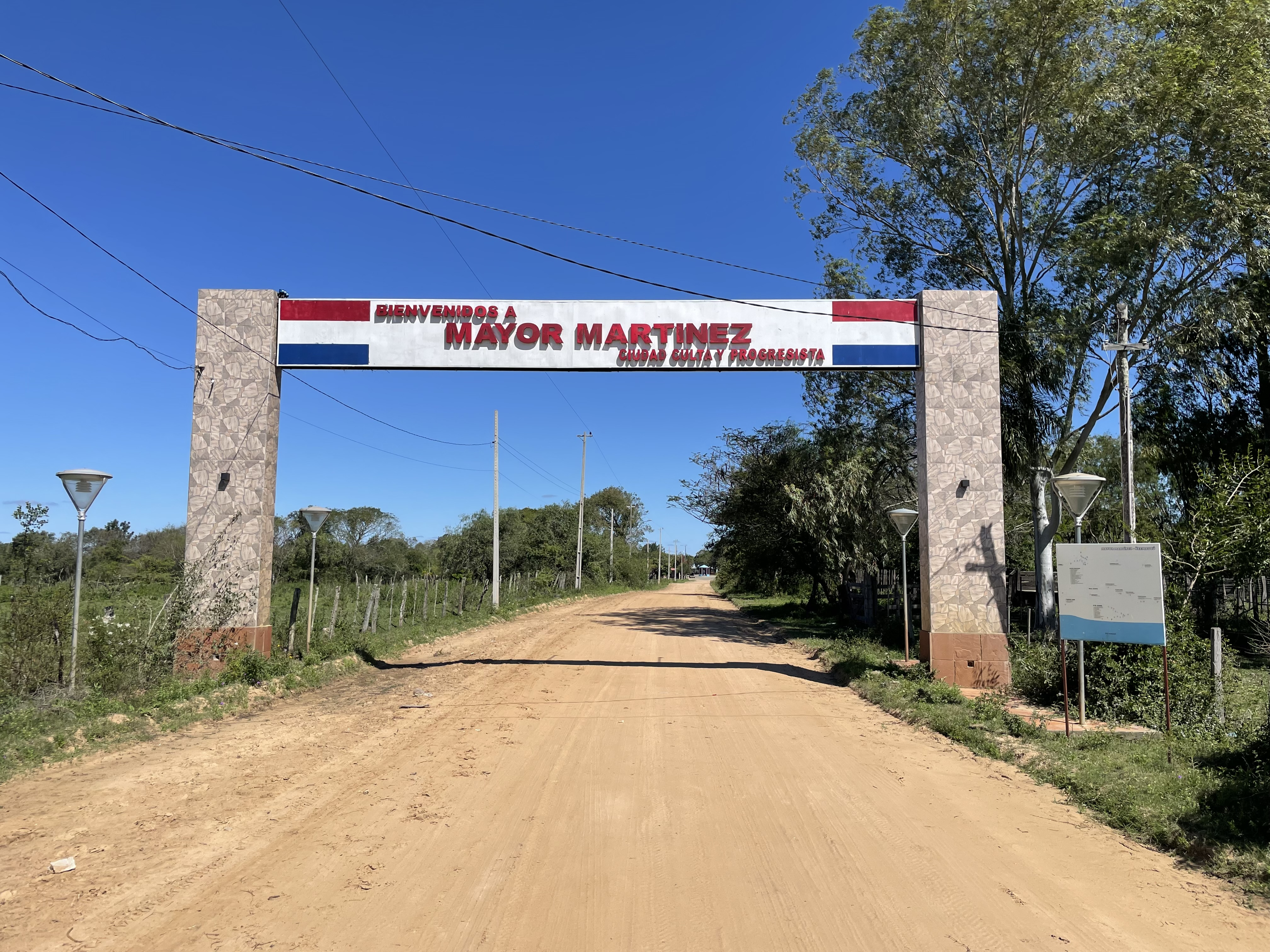
- Welcome sign entering the town

- Location within Paraguay
- Coordinates: 27°9′0″S 58°13′12″W
- Country: Paraguay
- Department: Ñeembucú

Population (2008)
  - Total: 1 019

Mayor José de Jesús Martínez or Mayor José J. Martínez is a town in the Ñeembucú department of Paraguay.

== Sources ==
- World Gazeteer: Paraguay – World-Gazetteer.com
