= Cerrito, Paraguay =

Cerrito
- Location within Paraguay
- Coordinates: 27°19′12″S 57°40′12″W
- Country: Paraguay
- Department: Ñeembucú

Population (2008)
  - Total: 1,105

Cerrito is a small town in the Ñeembucú Department, Paraguay.

It is located along the Paraná River, and is a small town with about 1,000 permanent residents. Its name comes from a little hill (cerrito) located on the bank of the river, from which you can see the beautiful landscape of the city and the river.

With warm, clear water, and lovely beaches, Cerrito is a popular vacation spot. Sand dunes mark both sides of the river, and often stretch into the water. In fishing season, anglers flock to Cerrito in pursuit of the elusive Dorado.

At the top of the hill lied a statue of former Paraguayan president Alfredo Stroessner which was destroyed by a lightning strike just before he was overthrown out of the presidency in 1989. Some believe this event indicated a "prediction" of the eventual fall of Stroessner. Others say the statue was never hit by lightning, but was actually toppled by the local citizens celebrating Strossener's overthrow. Local residents say the "hit-by-lightning" story was invented out of embarrassment by local politicians because they belonged to the Colorado Party (Paraguay), same as the disgraced dictator.

A lot of Indian tribes inhabit the city, and several pre-Columbine tombs were found in an area that is very hard to reach because of the poor conditions of the dirt roads. The main tourist attraction of this city is the good fishing spots in the river. Fishing guides and camping areas are available. There are also water taxis to take passengers across the river to Argentina.

Cerrito is the birthplace of former Paraguay goalkeeper Justo Villar.
