= Tacuaras =

- Location within Paraguay
- Coordinates: 26°49′12″S 58°6′0″W
- Country: Paraguay
- Department: Ñeembucú
- Funded: 1791

Government
  - Intendant: Lorenzo Teófilo Irún Garcia

Population (2002)
  - Total: 3,280
- Time zone: -4 UTC
- Area code: 0786

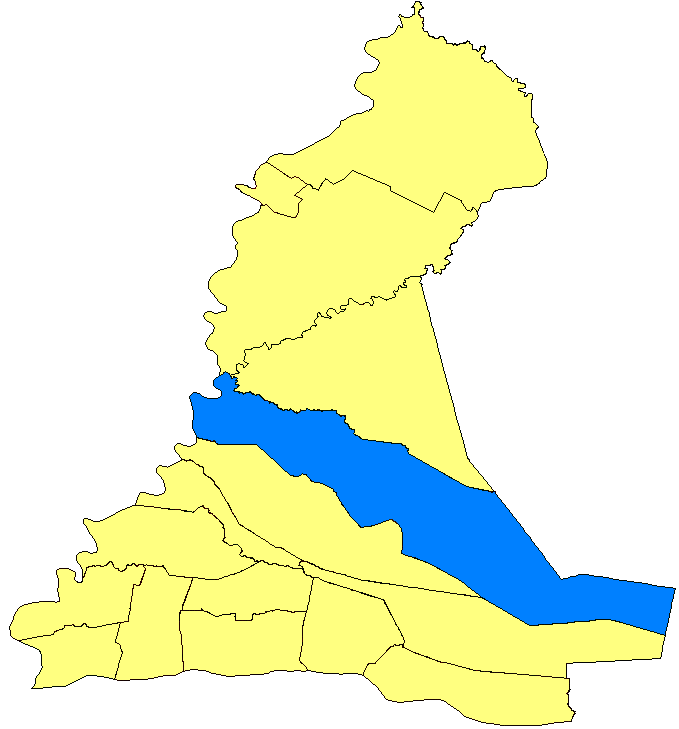
Map of Tacuaras

Tacuaras is a town in the Ñeembucú department of Paraguay. Tacuaras is a good fertile area for farming; it used to be lush green tropical forest, but now it has a population of about 300 people. The land in that territory is not very expensive, selling for about $100 per hectare.

== Sources ==
- World Gazeteer: Paraguay – World-Gazetteer.com
