= San Juan Bautista de Ñeembucú =

San Juan Bautista de Ñeembucú San Huã Bautista Ñe'embukupegua
- Location within Paraguay
- Coordinates: 26°39′0″S 57°55′48″W
- Country: Paraguay
- Department: Ñeembucú

Population (2008)
  - Total: 292

San Juan Bautista de Ñeembucú (Guarani: San Huã Bautista Ñe'embukupegua) is a village and distrito in the Ñeembucú department of Paraguay.

== Sources ==
- World Gazeteer: Paraguay – World-Gazetteer.com
