= Villa Franca =

- Location within Paraguay
- Coordinates: 26°16′48″S 58°8′24″W
- Country: Paraguay
- Department: Ñeembucú

Population (2008)
  - Total: 525

Villa Franca is a village in the Ñeembucú department of Paraguay.

== Sources ==
- World Gazeteer: Paraguay – World-Gazetteer.com
