= Guazu-Cua =

Guazú Cuá Guasu Kua (Guarani)
- Location within Paraguay
- Coordinates: 26°52′48″S 58°3′0″W
- Country: Paraguay
- Department: Ñeembucú

Population (2008)
  - Total: 441

Guazú Cuá (Guarani: Guasu Kua) is a village and district in the Ñeembucú department of Paraguay, located 14 kilometres south of Tacuaras. Guazú Cuá is a small rural community of around 440 people. Guazú Cuá has a school that goes up to the 11th grade, a well run healthpost, a police station, a church, soccer field with lights for night-time games and its own bus line, Linea 10 GuasuKua.

== Sources ==
- World Gazeteer: Paraguay – World-Gazetteer.com
