= Villa Oliva =

- Location within Paraguay
- Coordinates: 26°1′12″S 57°52′12″W
- Country: Paraguay
- Department: Ñeembucú

Population (2008)
  - Total: 990

Villa Oliva is a village in the Ñeembucú department of Paraguay.

== Sources ==
- World Gazeteer: Paraguay
- villa Oliva in istria
