= San Patricio, Paraguay =

Coordinates: 26.9667°S 56.8167°W

San Patricio is a town and district located in the Misiones department in Paraguay.
