= Villalbín =

- Location within Paraguay
- Coordinates: 27°9′0″S 57°55′12″W
- Country: Paraguay
- Department: Ñeembucú

Population (2008)
  - Total: 403
- Time zone: UTC−4 (PYT)
  - Summer (DST): UTC−3 (PYST)

Villalbín is a village and distrito in the Ñeembucú department of Paraguay.

== Sources ==
- World Gazeteer: Paraguay – World-Gazetteer.com
