= Paso de Patria =

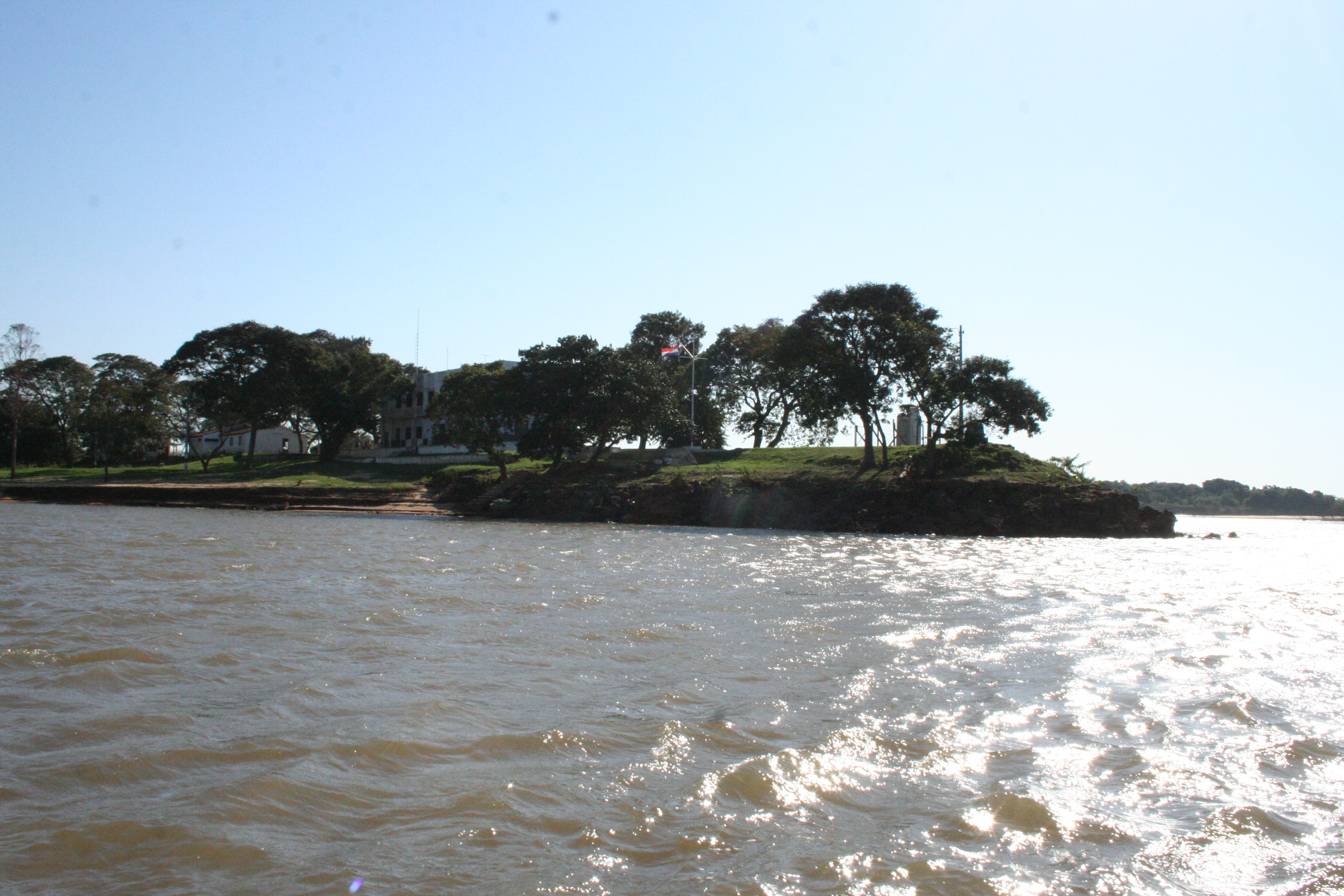
- Fortaleza de Itapirú, Paso de Patria, Paraguay

- Location within Paraguay
- Coordinates: 27°15′0″S 58°33′0″W
- Country: Paraguay
- Department: Ñeembucú

Population (2008)
  - Total: 938

Paso de Patria is a town at the Argentina–Paraguay border, in the Ñeembucú department of Paraguay.

== Sources ==
- World Gazeteer: Paraguay – World-Gazetteer.com
