= Ñeembucú Department =

Department of Paraguay

Ñeembucú Department Departamento de Ñeembucú (Spanish) Tetãvore Ñe'ẽmbuku (Guarani)
- Department
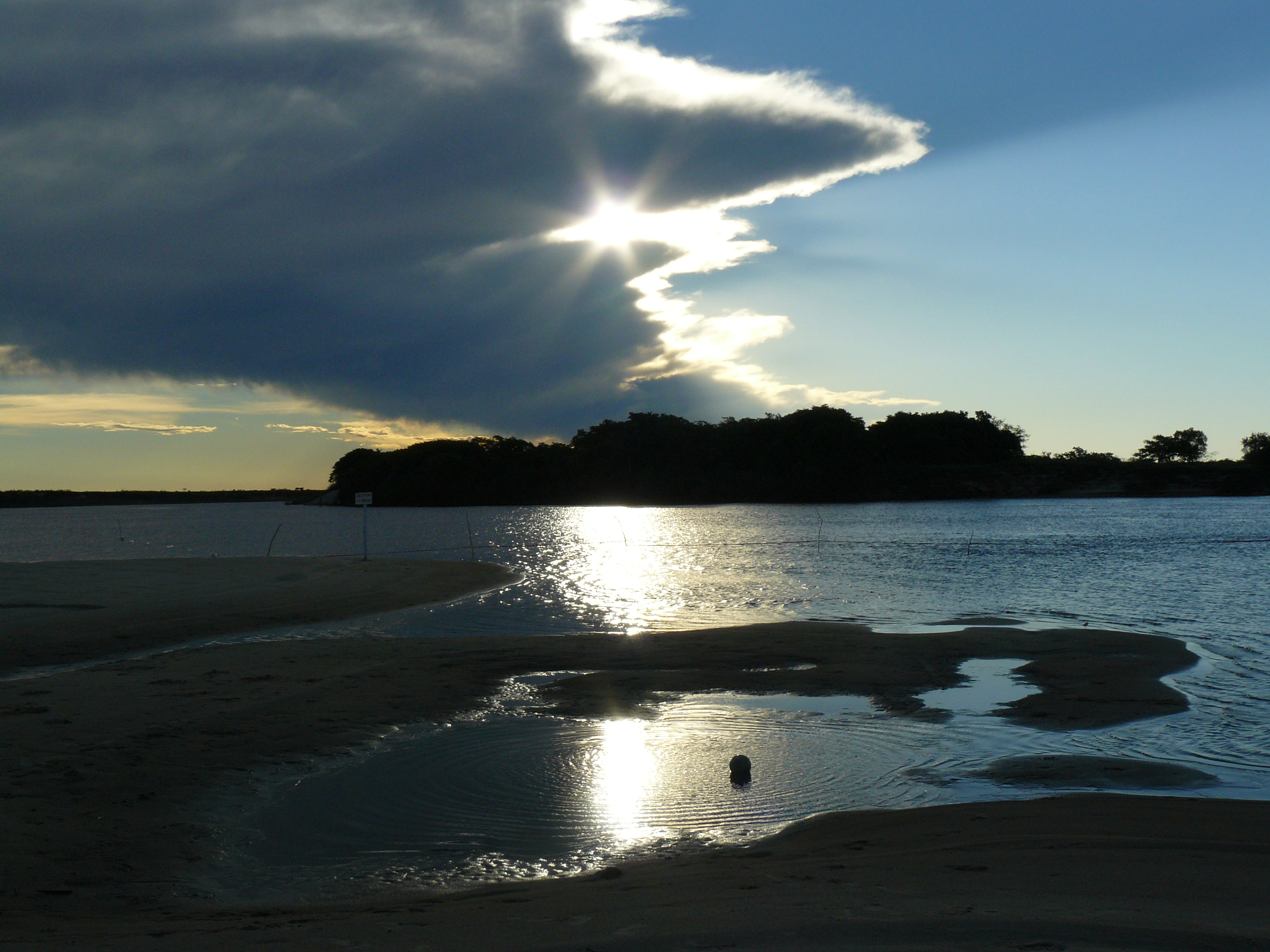
- View of the Paraguay River in Ñeembucú

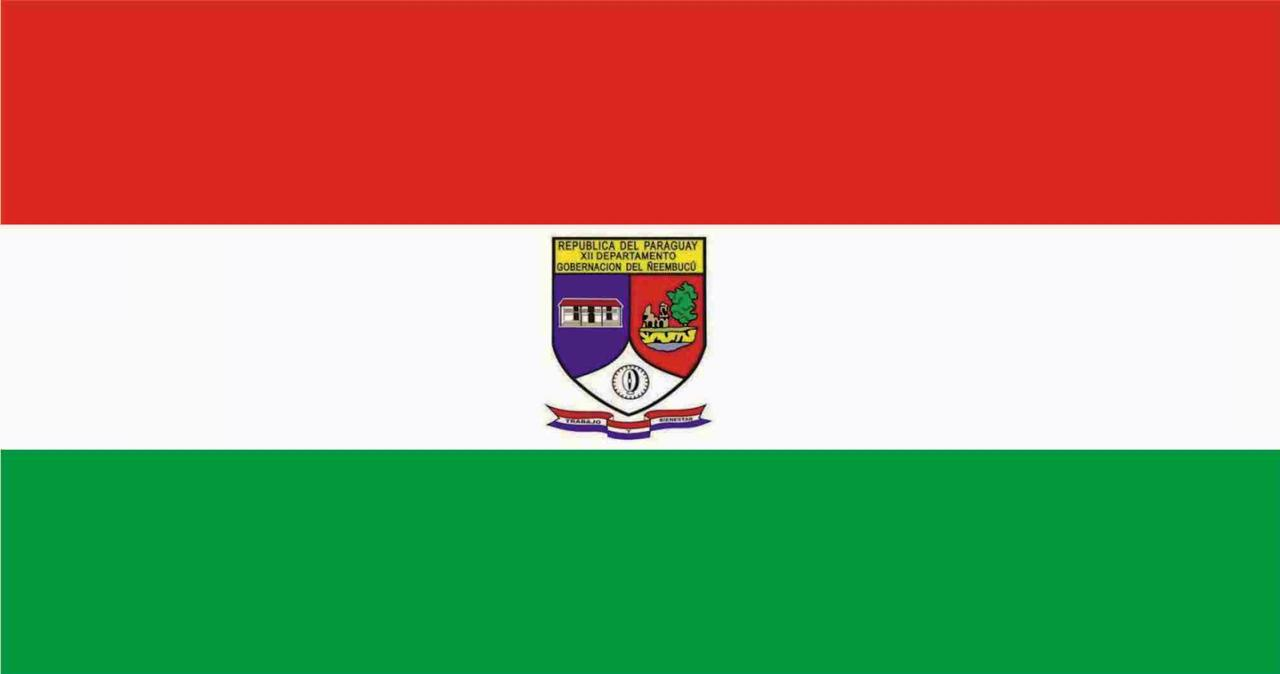
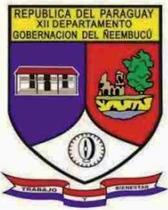
- Flag Coat of arms

- Ñeembucu shown in red
- Coordinates: 26°52′S 58°18′W
- Country: Paraguay
- Region: Eastern Region
- Established: 1776
- Capital: Pilar
- Largest city: Pilar

Government
  - Governor: Víctor Hugo Fornerón (ANR)

Area
  - Total: 12,147 km^{2} (4,690 sq mi)
  - Rank: 10

Population (2022 census)
  - Total: 76,719
  - Rank: 16
  - Density: 6.3159/km^{2} (16.358/sq mi)
- Time zone: UTC-04 (AST)
  - Summer (DST): UTC-03 (ADT)
- ISO 3166 code: PY-12
- Number of Districts: 16

Ñeembucú (Spanish pronunciation: [ɲe(e)mbuˈku]; Guaraní: Ñe'ẽmbuku) is a department located in the south of the Eastern Region of Paraguay. The capital is Pilar. The department is almost entirely rural, and is home to some of the oldest and best-preserved Jesuit ruins, which are located near the town of Humaitá.

== Districts ==
The department is divided in 16 districts:

1. Alberdi
2. Cerrito
3. Desmochados
4. General José Eduvigis Díaz
5. Guazú Cuá
6. Humaitá
7. Isla Umbú
8. Laureles
9. Mayor José J. Martínez
10. Paso de Patria
11. Pilar
12. San Juan Bautista de Ñeembucú
13. Tacuaras
14. Villa Franca
15. Villa Oliva
16. Villalbín

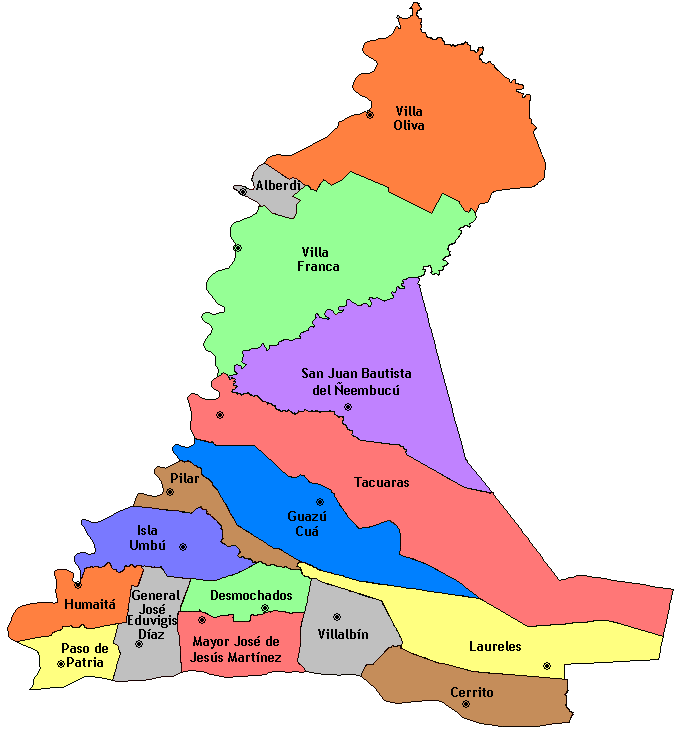

== Geography ==
=== Land ===
The terrain in Ñeembucú is markedly flat, covered mostly in flat, grassy fields only broken by the occasional wetland swamp or green "monte". Montes, despite their name, are not mountains at all, but patches of dense trees and brush that provide shade to the cattle who graze on the flat plains surrounding them. Almost all of the land in Ñeembucú is used for grazing (cattle, sheep) or other types of agriculture.

=== Borders ===
To the west, Ñeembucú is limited by the Rio Paraguay and Argentina, to the south by the Rio Paraná and Argentina, to the north by the Central department, and to the east by the departments of Paraguarí and Misiones.

== History ==
Ñeembucú was the theatre of the second phase of the War of the Triple Alliance. Battles fought there included Tuyutí, Curupaytí, the Boquerón del Sauce and Humaitá.

== See also ==
- List of high schools in Ñeembucú
