= Mullberg =

- District of Wiesmoor
- Interactive map of Mullberg
- Location within Germany Location within Lower Saxony
- Coordinates: 53.40378°N 7.76474°E
- Country: Germany
- State: Lower Saxony
- District: Aurich
- City: Wiesmoor
- Elevation: 12 m (39 ft)
- Time zone: UTC+01:00 (CET)
  - Summer (DST): UTC+02:00 (CEST)
- Postal codes: 26639
- Dialling codes: 04944
- Vehicle registration: AUR

Mullberg is a district (Stadtteil) of the East Frisian town of Wiesmoor, in Lower Saxony. A linear settlement, it is located southeast of the town and east of the Nordgeorgsfehn Canal.

== Etymology ==
The name Mullberg is derived from the Low German word Mull for humus soil, and Berg refers to the sand ridges that once existed in that area.

== History ==
Settlers originally wanted to settle in the place, which lies on the southeastern outskirts of the present-day town of Wiesmoor, as early as 1840. However, this took more than 70 years, as the Nordgeorgsfehn Canal had to be built beforehand to ensure the necessary drainage of the raised bog.

The settlement process that began in 1914 corresponded to the requirements of the so-called Deutschen Hochmoorkultur ("German raised bog culture"), i.e. drainage was followed by arable farming with the help of artificial fertilizers. Workers who farmed as a secondary occupation were settled there. Farm settlements with farms measuring 26 to 31 hectares only began to emerge in the 1950s. The school established in 1927 was closed in 1997.

An independent municipality since 1922, Mullberg was incorporated into the newly created municipality of Wiesmoor together with the present-day districts of Auricher Wiesmoor II and Wilhelmsfehn I and II in 1951. At the same time, the area was transferred from the Wittmund district to the Aurich district.
