= Rammsfehn =

- District of Wiesmoor
- Interactive map of Rammsfehn
- Location within Germany Location within Lower Saxony
- Coordinates: 53.38885°N 7.74599°E
- Country: Germany
- State: Lower Saxony
- District: Aurich
- City: Wiesmoor
- Time zone: UTC+01:00 (CET)
  - Summer (DST): UTC+02:00 (CEST)
- Postal codes: 26639
- Dialling codes: 04944
- Vehicle registration: AUR

Rammsfehn is a district (Stadtteil) of the East Frisian town of Wiesmoor, in Lower Saxony. A linear settlement, it is located south of the town, along the Nordgeorgsfehn Canal, just to the northeast of Hinrichsfehn.

== History ==
Rammsfehn is the second youngest district of Wiesmoor and was built in the 1930s on both sides of Oldenburger Straße (Landesstraße 12). The district was named after Eberhard Ramm, State Secretary in the Prussian Ministry of Agriculture. The colonist district was built for the workers of the peat power plant of the electricity company Nordwestdeutsche Kraftwerke. The district consisted of 13 semi-detached houses and eight single houses until the Second World War, but grew after the war through the settlement of displaced persons. Rammsfehn is part of the town of Wiesmoor since 1951.
