= Germany–Paraguay relations =

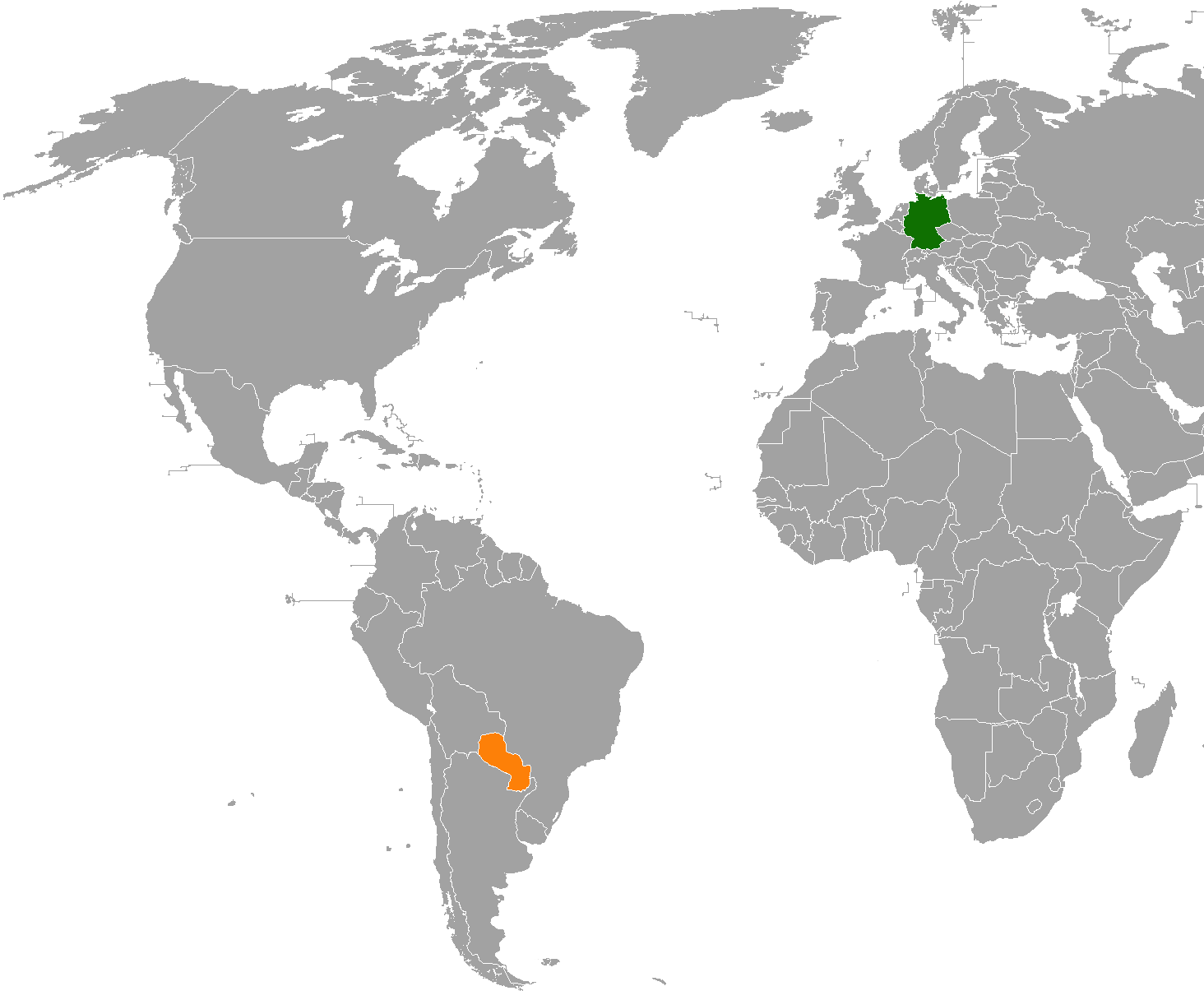

- Germany: Paraguay

Germany–Paraguay relations are the bilateral relations between Germany and Paraguay. Both nations enjoy friendly relations, the importance of which centers on the history of German migration to Paraguay. Approximately 300,000 Paraguayans claim German origin.

== History ==
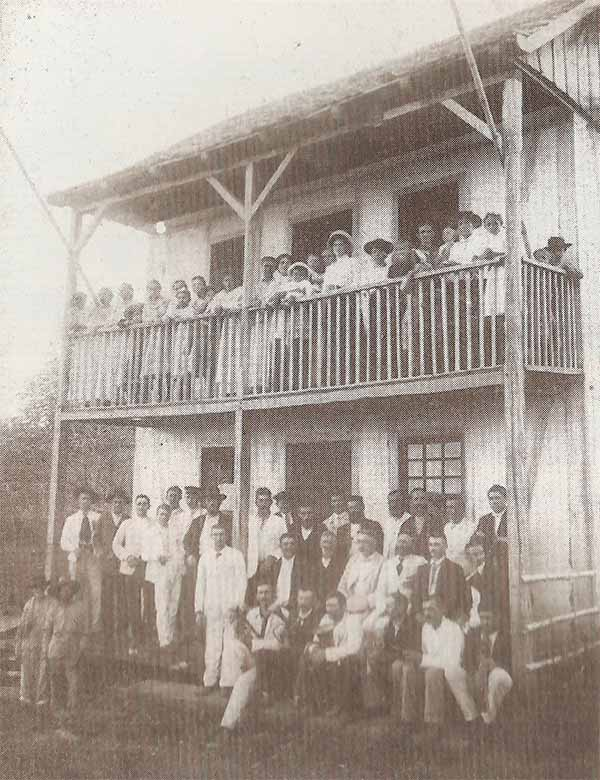
German migrants in Hohenau, Paraguay, 1912.

Paraguay established diplomatic relations with Prussia in 1860. In the aftermath of the War of the Triple Alliance between Paraguay and its neighbors, Paraguay lost up to 69% of its population, mostly due to illness, hunger and physical exhaustion, of which 90% were male. As a result, Paraguay took steps to promote immigration to the country. Several communities from Europe and Asia took initiative to settle in Paraguay. One of the first groups were a group of Germans led by Bernhard Förster and Elisabeth Förster-Nietzsche (the sister of German philosopher Friedrich Nietzsche) who came to Paraguay in 1887 with 14 German families to establish and create a model community in the New World and to demonstrate the supremacy of German culture and society. The settlement they established was called Nueva Germania. The settlement did not last and several people from the settlement returned to Germany, but many stayed and their descendants remain in Paraguay today. Later, groups of Mennonites arrived in Paraguay and settled in its Gran Chaco region.

In 1922, Germany opened a diplomatic legation in Asunción. Between the two World Wars there were several more waves of German immigration to the country. During World War II, Paraguay was initially in favor of the Axis powers, but, due to international pressure, Paraguay declared war on the Axis powers in February 1945. During the war, Paraguay was a major hotspot for German espionage during Operation Bolívar. After the war Paraguay received many Nazis to the country escaping capture and trial. Notable Nazis such as Eduard Roschmann and Josef Mengele moved to Paraguay. In 1959, Josef Mengele became a naturalized citizen of Paraguay and resided in Hohenau, Paraguay near the Argentine border.

In 1954, West Germany opened an embassy in Asunción. That same year, Alfredo Stroessner became President of Paraguay. Stroessner was of German origin on his father's side and ruled Paraguay for 35 years. His time in office became known as El Stronato. Stroessner kept close political ties with West Germany and paid several visits to the country, but relations between West Germany and Stroessner soured when the West German government pressured him to stop sheltering Nazi war criminals in Paraguay. In 1964, the West German government asked Stroessner to extradite Mengele but Stroessner angrily refused and would not strip him of his citizenship either. In February 1989, Stroessner was ousted from power and relations between West Germany and Paraguay resumed once again.

After the reunification of Germany Germany continued to assist Paraguay on the road to democracy, and with investigations into human rights violations committed during the Stroessner dictatorship. The German development agency, GIZ, has carried out several development-related projects in Paraguay. Furthermore, leaders of both nations have met on numerous occasions and have signed several bilateral agreements. In May 2019, Paraguayan Foreign Minister Luis Castiglioni visited Germany and met German Foreign Minister Heiko Maas. During his visit, Foreign Minister Castiglioni asked for continued German support in strengthening the rule of law, scholarships programs for specializations and assistance in fighting deforestation and climate change in Paraguay.

== Trade ==
In 2019, trade between both nations totaled €270 million. Germany's main exports to Paraguay include: vehicle parts, machinery and chemical products. Paraguay's main exports to Germany include: raw materials, especially oil seeds and oleaginous fruits. Germany's development assistance to Paraguay focuses on rural development and sustainable management of resources.

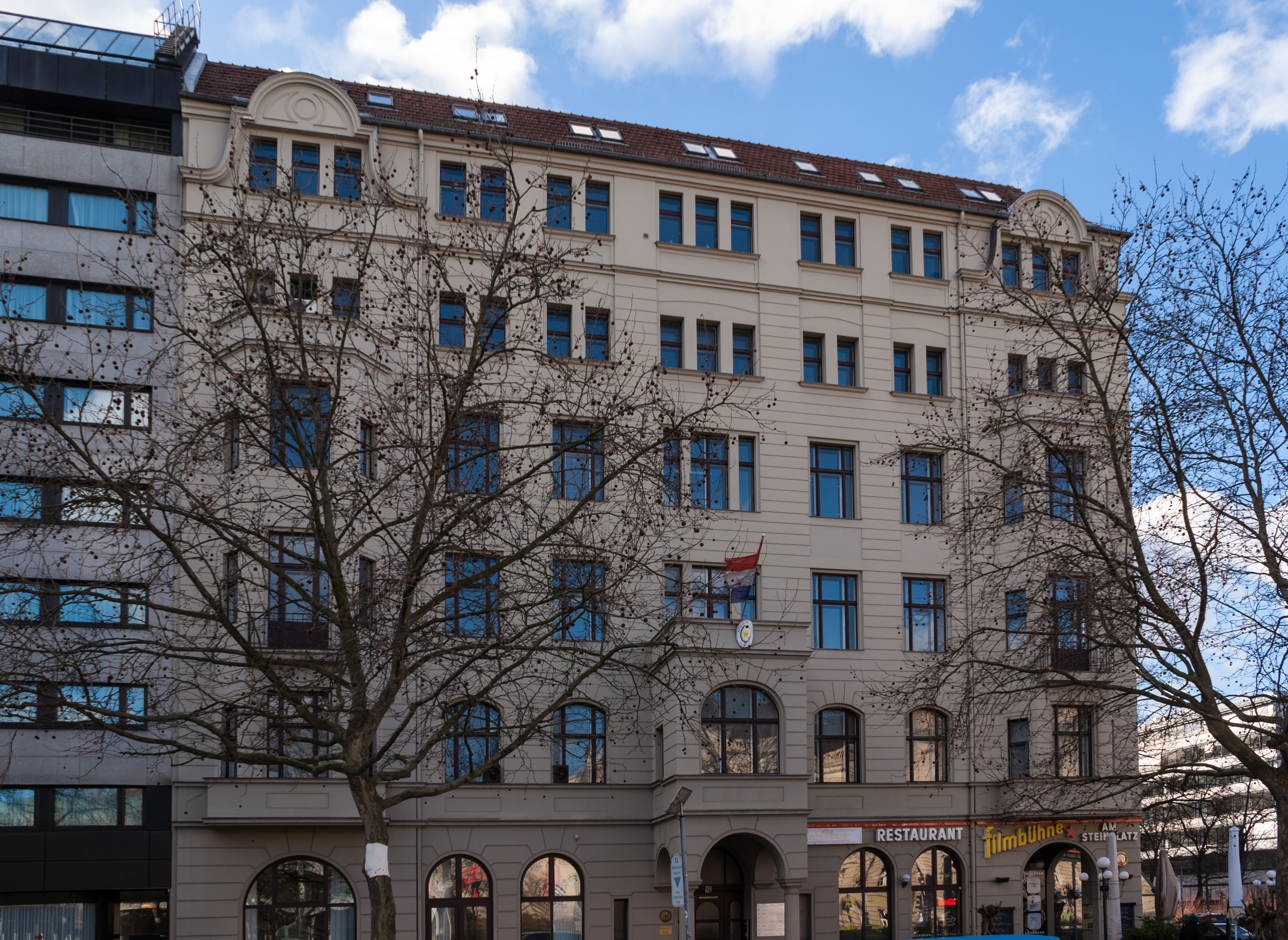
Embassy of Paraguay in Berlin

== Resident diplomatic missions ==
- Germany has an embassy in Asunción.
- Paraguay has an embassy in Berlin and a consulate-general in Frankfurt.

== See also ==
- Foreign relations of Germany
- Foreign relations of Paraguay
- Germans in Paraguay
- List of ambassadors of Germany to Paraguay
- List of ambassadors of Paraguay to Germany
