= Auricher Wiesmoor II =

- District of Wiesmoor
- Interactive map of Auricher Wiesmoor II
- Location within Germany Location within Lower Saxony
- Coordinates: 53.39753°N 7.67232°E
- Country: Germany
- State: Lower Saxony
- District: Aurich
- City: Wiesmoor
- Time zone: UTC+01:00 (CET)
  - Summer (DST): UTC+02:00 (CEST)
- Postal codes: 26639
- Dialling codes: 04944
- Vehicle registration: AUR

Auricher Wiesmoor II is a district (Stadtteil) of the East Frisian town of Wiesmoor, in Lower Saxony. A linear settlement, it is located southwest of the town and runs along the Voßbarg Canal.

== History ==
The settlement owes its name to the almost central subdivision of the Ostfriesischen Zentralhochmoores (East Frisian Central Raised Bog), carried out by the Hanoverian government in 1840. In addition to the Aurich Wiesmoor, the Friedeburg Wiesmoor was also created. The border between the two areas is now formed by the Nordgeorgsfehn Canal. After the integration of the Kingdom of Hanover into the Kingdom of Prussia in 1866, the Auricher Wiesmoor was divided by the Prussian administration into the Aurich Wiesmoor I, which today includes the villages of Aurich-Oldendorf, Kreismoor and Felde in the municipality of Großefehn, and the Aurich Wiesmoor II, which lies south of Wilhelmsfehn I and II.

The construction of a state-owned settlement began here in 1878 on an area of 1,800 hectares. For this purpose, 48 colonies with an area of 4 to 6 hectares were created in the form of tract housing, which were sold after a few years. In 1890 the place became an independent municipality, which was incorporated into the municipality of Wiesmoor in 1951.
