= German Paraguayans =

Ethnic group in Paraguay

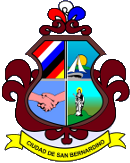
- The coat of arms of the city of San Bernardino, a German-founded town in Paraguay, displays the German and Paraguayan flags.

Total population
- 450,000

Regions with significant populations
- Asunción, Itapúa Department and Boquerón Department.

Languages
- Paraguayan Spanish, Guaraní, German, Hunsrik, Plautdietsch

Religion
- Christianity (mostly Roman Catholic and Protestantism), Judaism

Related ethnic groups
- German diaspora, German Canadians, German-Chileans, German-Argentinians, German-Brazilian, German Uruguayan, German Americans, Russia Germans

The German minority in Paraguay came into existence with immigration during the industrial age. The "Nueva Germania" colony was founded in Paraguay in 1888; though regarded as a failure, it still exists despite being abandoned by many of its founders in the 1890s. Paraguay was a popular place for German leaders accused of war crimes to retreat after the second World War. There are large communities of German descendants living in the central Paraguayan department of Guairá, in a town called Colonia Independencia, in the northern Paraguayan department capital city of Filadelfia and in the southern Paraguayan cities of Encarnación, Obligado, Bella Vista, Fram, Pilar, San Ignacio, Coronel Bogado and Hohenau. Some recent immigrants from other countries to Paraguay also have German ancestry. Notable Paraguayans of German descent include the former president of Paraguay Alfredo Stroessner. The German Paraguayans are one of the most prominent and growing German communities in South America, with some 25,000 German-speaking Mennonites living in the Paraguayan Chaco.

== Russian Mennonites ==
Another large group of Germanic people who immigrated to Paraguay are Plautdietsch-speaking Russian Mennonites, people of Dutch and Prussian ancestry who immigrated to Russia under the rule of Czarina Catherine the Great. The Paraguayan Mennonite community left Russia in two waves: the first in the 19th century when their exemption from military service ended, and the second to avoid Stalin's collectivization programs. Russian Mennonites are different from another German-Russian group, the Volga Germans, through religion, ethnicity, and reasons for immigrating to Russia. Russian Mennonites are religious Mennonites while the Volga Germans are religious Lutherans and Roman Catholics. Russian Mennonites are mostly of Flemish and Frisian origin.

When the Communists came to power in Russia, the German-speaking population were persecuted by the new government. Some Russian Mennonites saw Paraguay as a perfect place to settle because it looked isolated. The government of Paraguay wanted more people to settle in the Chaco region, which was under dispute with its southern neighbor Argentina and its western neighbor Bolivia. The move to Paraguay was difficult for the Russian Mennonites, because they were new to the climate. Some of them left Paraguay for neighboring Argentina, where they met many Volga Germans, who had decided to settle in Argentina to escape the persecution in Russia.

The Russian Mennonites settled in the Boquerón Department in Paraguay.

== Gallery ==
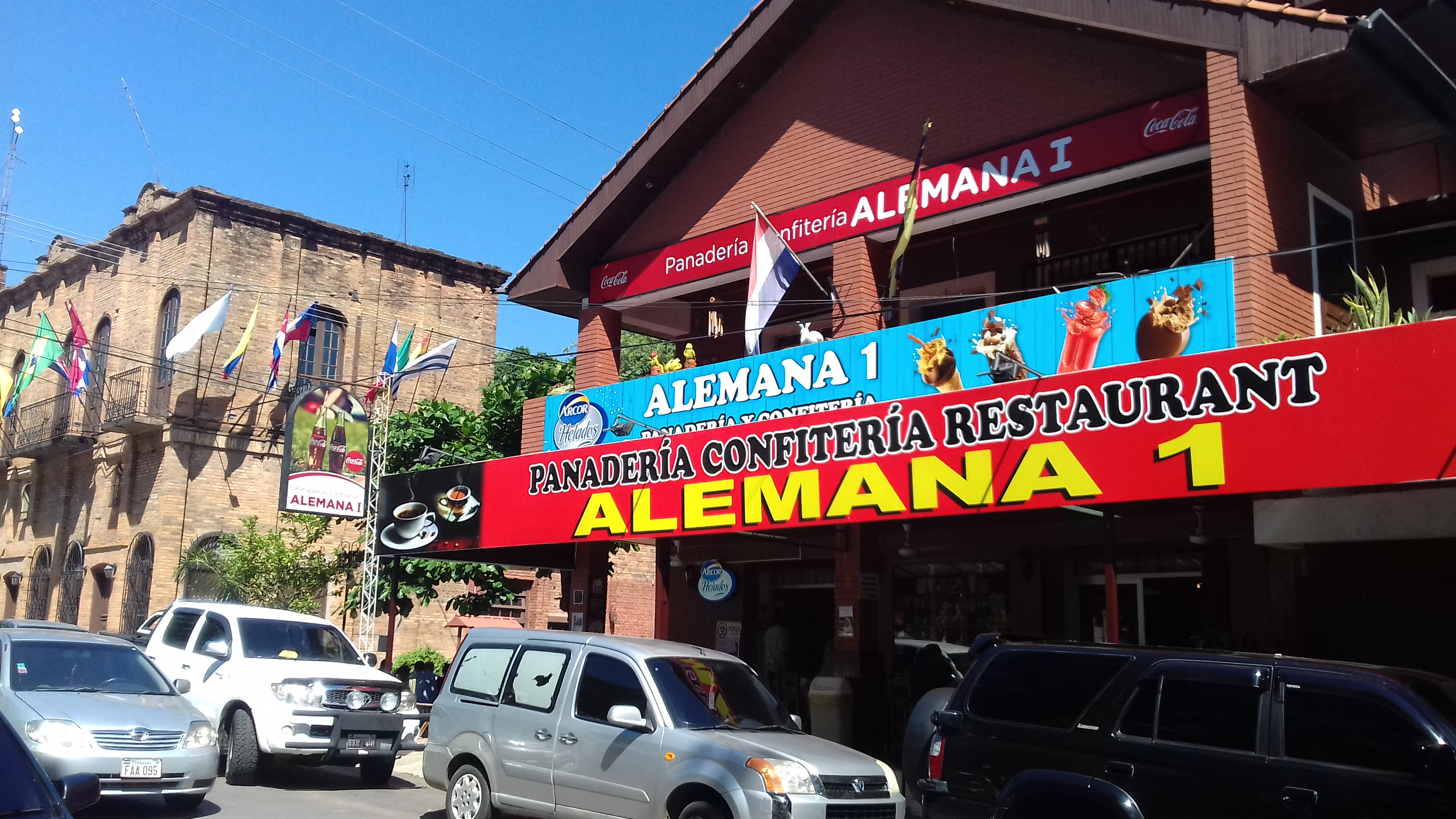
Alemana 1, a German pastry shop and restaurant in San Bernardino, is a popular meeting place year-round.

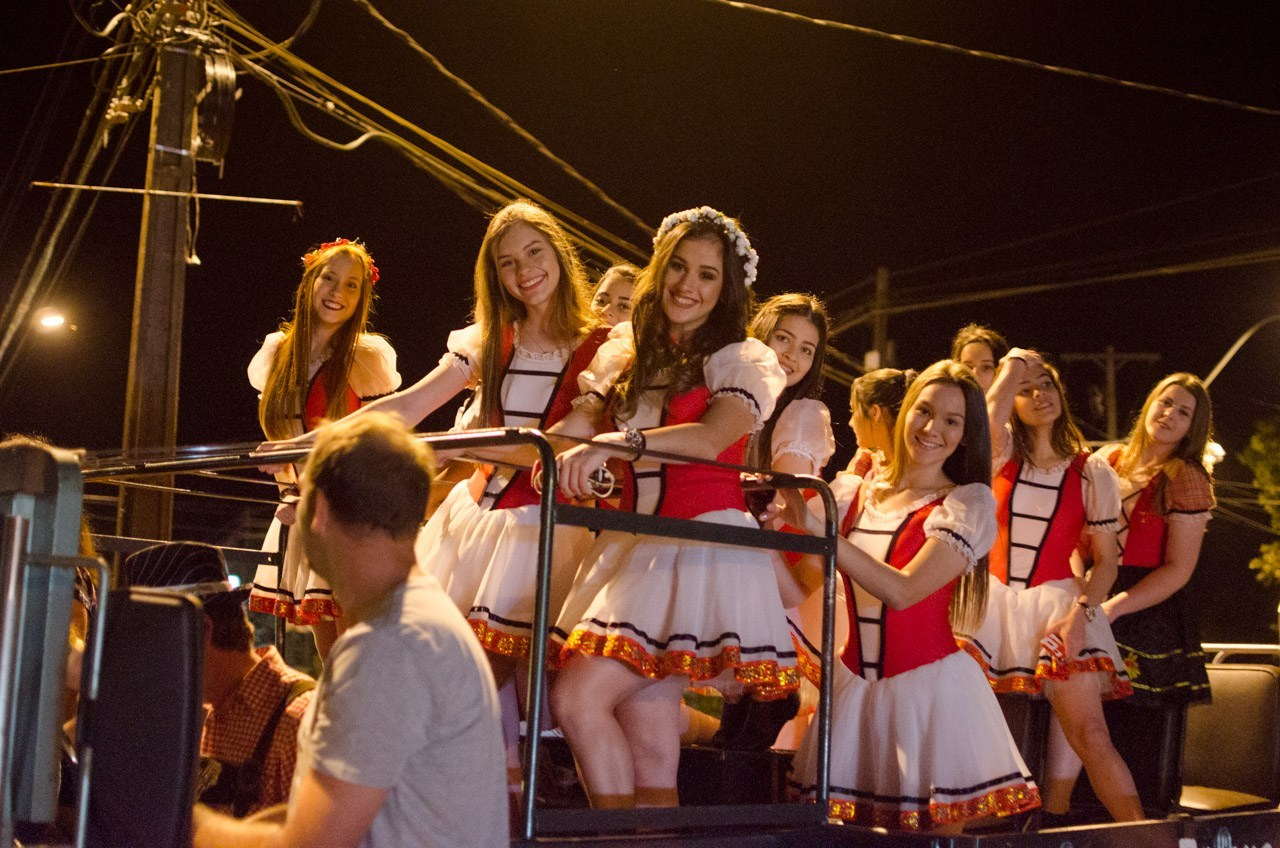
Girls from the Obligado dance school promote the Choppfest 2017, wearing the Dirndl.

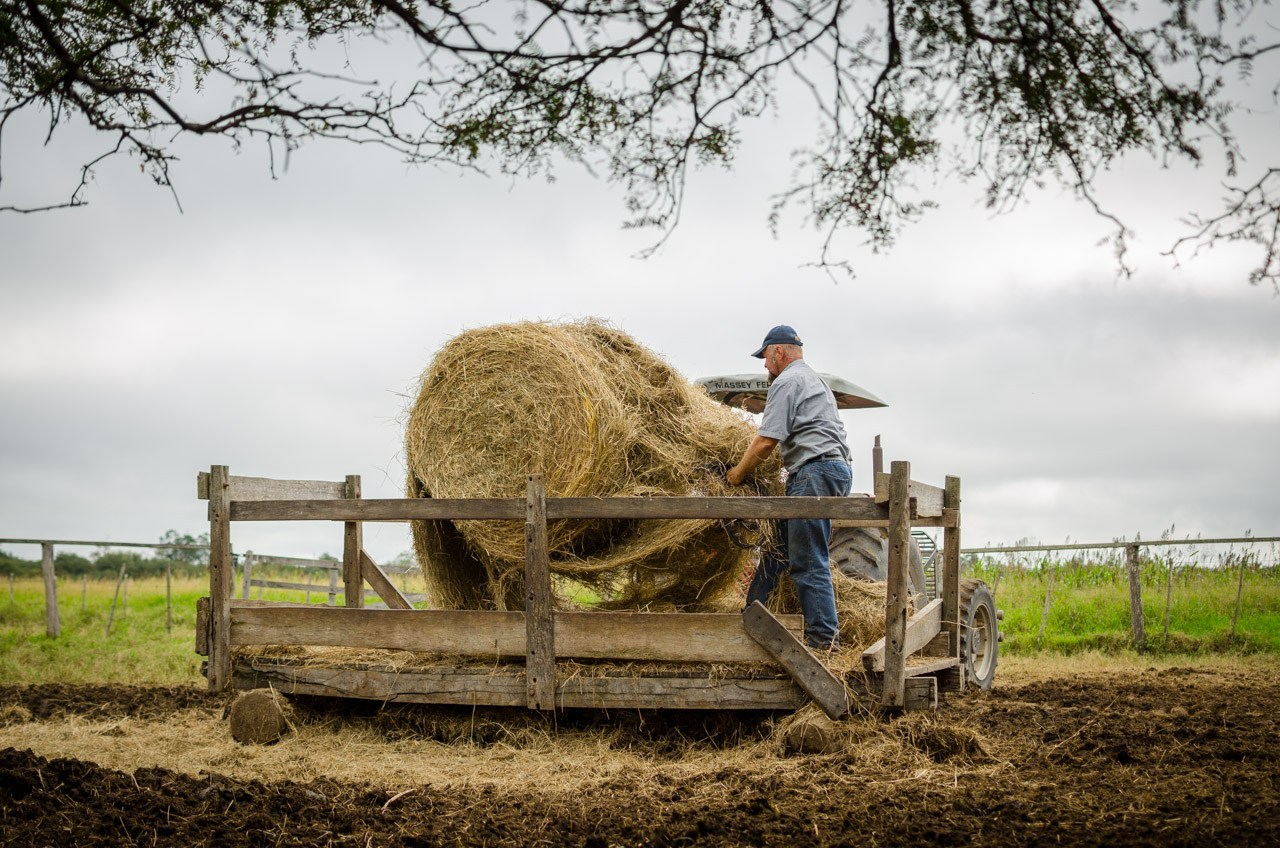
A farmer rolls out hay to feed the cows on his farm near the Mennonite village of Grünau, Presidente Hayes Department

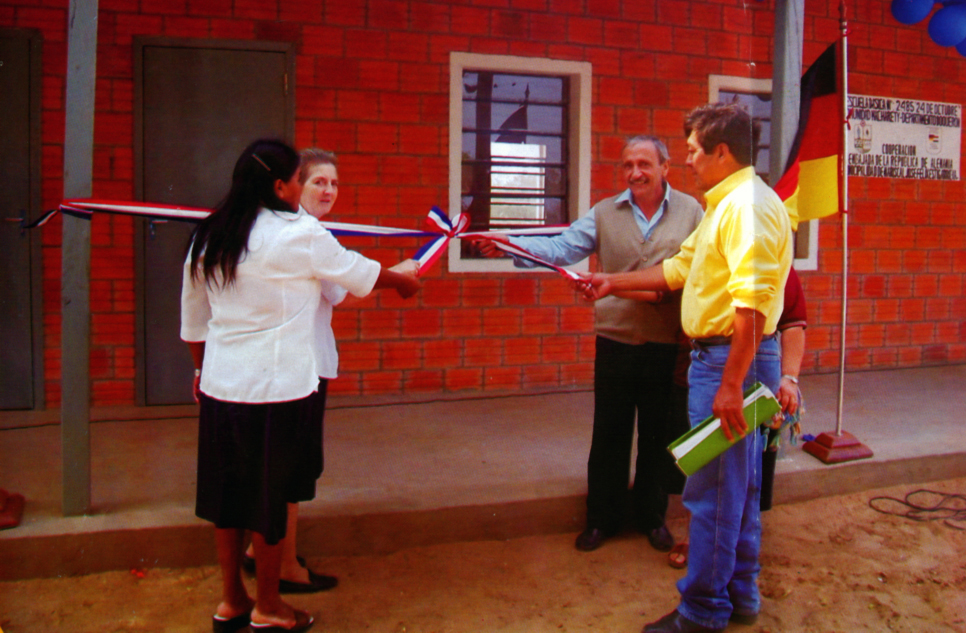
Inauguration of a German-Paraguayan school in the Boquerón Department, where there is a significant population of German descent, (Mennonites), Paraguayan Chaco.

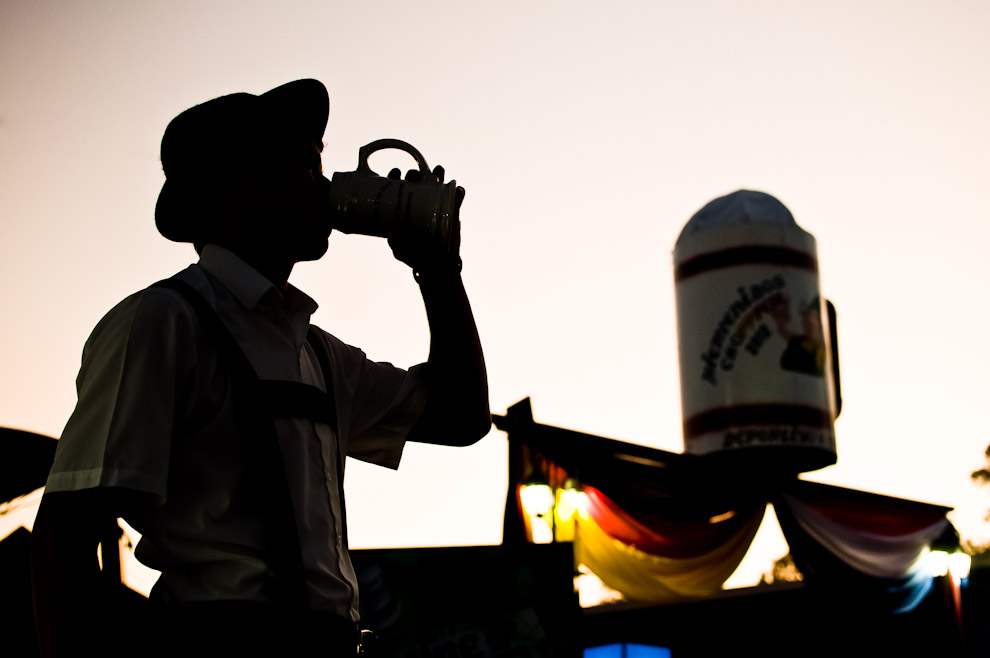
Young man drinking a beer in front of the Club Alemán in Colonia Independencia, Central Paraguay.

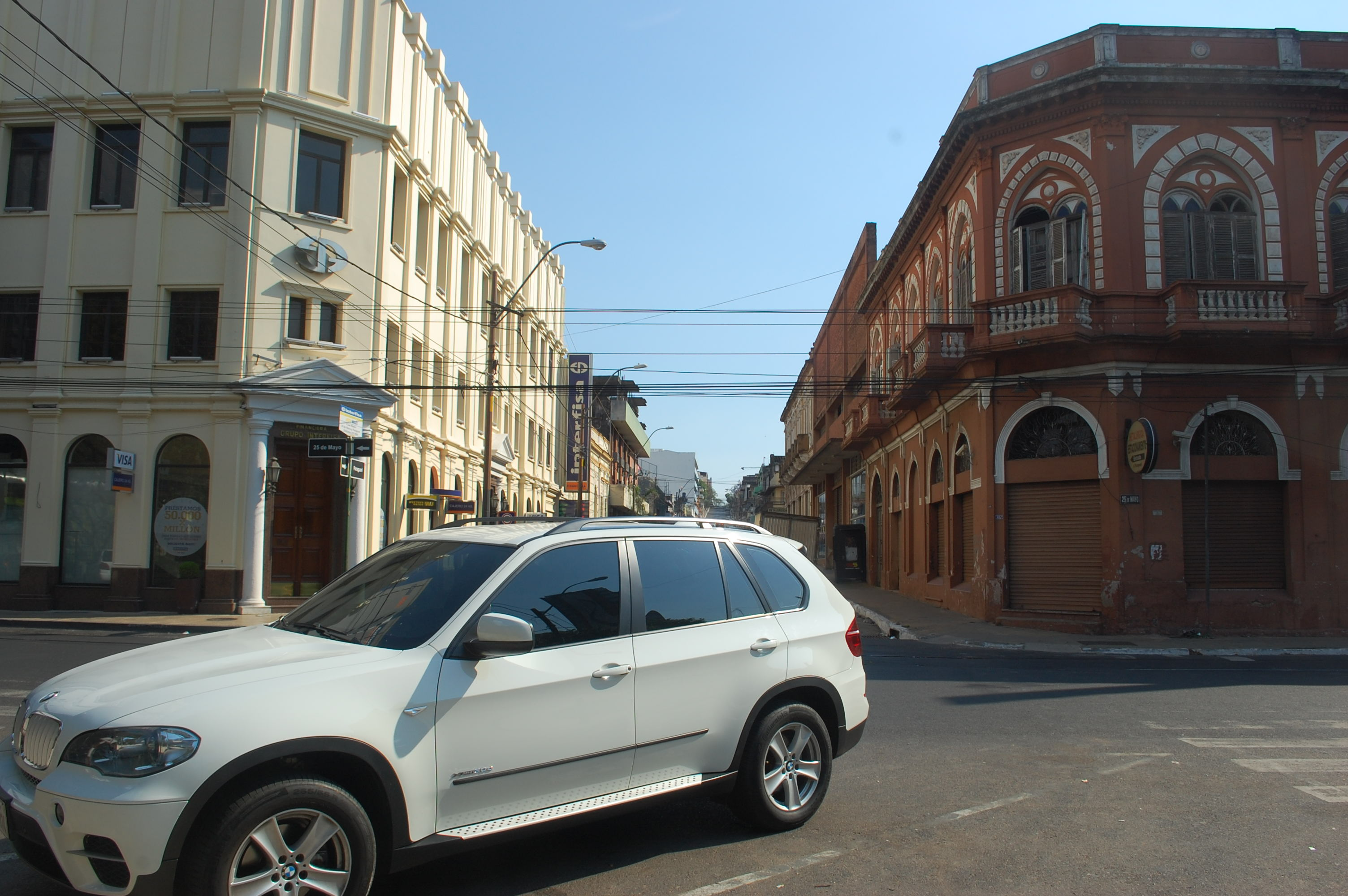
A BMW X5 in Asunción

== Education ==
German schools:

- Deutsche Schule, Asunción
- Colegio Aleman Concordia, Asunción
- Colegio Gutenberg, Asunción

Historic German schools:

- Deutsche Schulen Alto-Parana-Gebiet
- Deutsche Schulen, Zentralschule Filadelfia, and Lehrerseminar Filadelfia Kolonie Fernheim
- Deutsche Schulen and Zentralschule (Kolonie Friesland)
- Deutsche Schulen (Kolonie Independencia)
- Deutsche Schulen, Vereinschule Loma Plata, and Lehrerfortbildungsanstalt Loma Plata (Kolonie Menno)
- Deutsche Schulen and Zentralschule Halbstadt (Kolonie Neuland)
- Deutsche Schule and Zentralschule Tiefenbrunn(Kolonie Volendam)

== See also ==
- Demographics of Paraguay
- German Argentine
- German Brazilian (see also: Riograndenser Hunsrückisch)
- German Bolivians
- Bavaria
- Germany–Paraguay relations
- Roque Santa Cruz
