= Rudolf von Bülow =

German diplomat

German Envoy to Paraguay
- In office 1922–1933
- Preceded by: Paul Goetsch
- Succeeded by: Erhard von Wedel

Personal details
- Born: Rudolf Ernst Alfred Arthur von Bülow; 1 January 1873; Goslar, Lower Saxony, German Empire
- Died: 1955 (aged 82); Waren, Mecklenburg-Vorpommern, Germany
- Relations: Otto von Bülow (uncle)
- Parent(s): Albert von Bülow; Marie Friederike Emilie Karoline von Meerheimb

Rudolf Ernst Alfred Arthur von Bülow (1 January 1873 – 1955) was a German diplomat.

== Early life ==
Bülow was born on 1 January 1873 in Goslar, in Lower Saxony, Germany into the von Bülow family, a part of the Mecklenburg nobility. He was a younger son of Prussian Major general Albert von Bülow and Baroness Marie Friederike Emilie Karoline von Meerheimb. Among his extended family were uncles, Otto von Bülow, a prominent diplomat, and Adolf von Bülow, the General Adjutant and Royal Prussian General of the Cavalry.

He studied law at the Ruprecht-Karls University. In 1894 he was commissioned into the Corps Vandalia Heidelberg.

== Career ==
After completing his studies, he entered the judicial service, but later switched to the diplomatic service. In 1903 he became vice-consul in Cape Town. In 1906 he became head of the Consulate general in Lourenco Marques. In 1906 he was appointed Consul general in Madrid, in 1913 in Alexandria and in 1914 in Kovno. In 1914 he was taken prisoner by Russia on the Eastern Front during World War I. After a prisoner of war exchange in 1915, he was again employed in the Foreign Office. First in 1915 in Department IV (News) and then in 1916 as head of the Arnhem passport office. He became Consul general in Brno and Sofia in 1918, in Schaffhausen in 1919 and in Rio de Janeiro in 1920. From 1922 to 1933, he was German envoy in Asunción.

== Personal life ==
Bülow died in 1955 in Waren, a town and climatic spa in the state of Mecklenburg-Vorpommern, Germany.

Diplomatic posts
Preceded by Paul Goetsch	German envoy to Paraguay; 1922–1933	Succeeded by Erhard von Wedel
