= Wiesmoor =

- Town
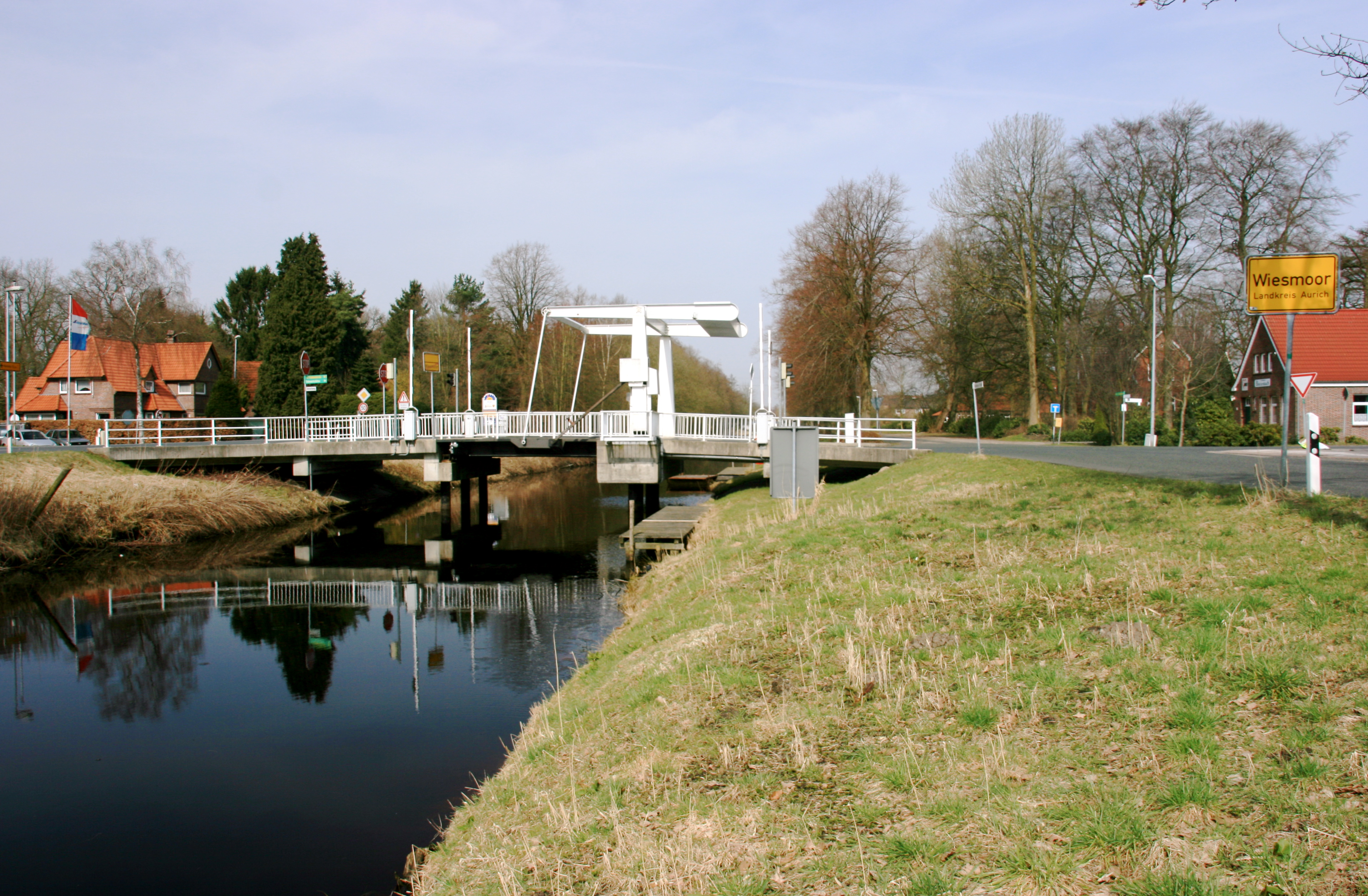

- Flag Coat of arms

- Location of Wiesmoor within Aurich district
- Interactive map of Wiesmoor
- Location within Germany Location within Lower Saxony
- Coordinates: 53.41598°N 7.73374°E
- Country: Germany
- State: Lower Saxony
- District: Aurich
- Subdivisions: 8 districts

Government
  - Mayor (2021–26): Sven Lübbers (Ind.)

Area
  - Total: 82.94 km^{2} (32.02 sq mi)
- Elevation: 11 m (36 ft)

Population (2025-12-31)
  - Total: 13,967
  - Density: 168.4/km^{2} (436.2/sq mi)
- Time zone: UTC+01:00 (CET)
  - Summer (DST): UTC+02:00 (CEST)
- Postal codes: 26639
- Dialling codes: 04944
- Vehicle registration: AUR
- Website: www.wiesmoor.de

Wiesmoor (German pronunciation: [ˈviːsˌmoːɐ̯]) is a town in the district of Aurich in the northwest of Lower Saxony. It lies on the Nordgeorgsfehnkanal and is the youngest town in the East Frisia area having been bestowed town rights on 16 March 2006, two days later on 18 March 2006, Wiesmoor celebrated the Centenary of the settlement's founding. The town owes its growth to the industrialisation of the harvesting of peat from the surrounding moors. Wiesmoor holds an annual flower festival and the town is also known as the ‘Flower City’, the name originates from the large numbers of flowers which are grown in the town’s industrial greenhouse. Formerly the greenhouses were heated by waste heat from the now defunct peat burning power station which was located in the city. Wiesmoor also has the official title of a Luftkurort; tourism now plays an important role in the local economy.

== Geography ==
Wiesmoor lies around 30 km inland from the North Sea in the north-western Germany in the centre of the historic district of East Frisia. The city of Wiesmoor and its surroundings have a population of between 35,000 and 40,000 people.

The most south-eastern community in the Landkreis of Aurich Wiesmoor lies centrally within the East Frisian peninsula. The city is in the district of Aurich. In the East, the city borders with the Friedeburg in the district of Wittmund, in the south with Uplengen in the district of Leer. West of Wiesmoor is the village of Großefehn lies and to the north of that the city of Aurich, both in the district of Aurich.

The closest large cities to Wiesmoor are Wilhelmshaven (30 km to the North East), Oldenburg (45 km to the South East), Bremen (80 km to the South East) as well as the Dutch city of Groningen (80 km to the South West).

The entire metropolitan area of Wiesmoor extends to an area of 82.99 km². The city has dimensions of approximately 11 km in the North-South direction and about 7 km in the East-West Direction.

The city of Wiesmoor lies in the middle part of the East Frisian raised bog, which was formed by glaciation and contained up to 1900 layers of peat up to 8m deep. Originally the bog had an area of around 100km2 although the majority of that is now covered by the city.

The city ranges over heights of 10.6 to 14m above sea level, with the average being 11m.

Wiesmoor was laid out in 1906, the city today consists of the original 20th-century planned city and an additional 9 quarters. A peculiarity of Wiesmoor lies therein that almost all current quarters of the city are older than the City Centre itself.

== History ==
The bog area around Wiesmoor remained mostly uninhabited for a long time. The earliest records for the presence of people are a Stone Age axe and an earthen vessel from the pre-Roman Iron Age that were discovered in Marcardsmoor. These items likely belonged to someone who drowned in the bog rather than an indication of a durable settlement. In the bog in Wilhelmsfehn, a neck ring from around 700 BCE has also been found. In 1999 a bronze hatchet which dated to the middle of the Bronze Age was discovered amongst rubbish in Ostgroßefehn. The hatchet is unique to East Frisia and it was likely disposed of in the bog rather than originating in the area.

In 1633 colonisation of the bog area surrounding Wiesmoor began, however by 1880, there were still only around 100 inhabitants living within the current city area. At the beginning of the 20th century plans were drawn up by Dr. Eberhard Ramm from the Prussian Ministry of Agriculture to begin industrial harvesting of peat from the bogs, this would be done using large machinery rather than the traditional methods of spades and hoes. Further to this Dr. Ramm, in co-operation with Carl Friedrich von Siemens, also planned to construct a new peat burning power plant in the area.

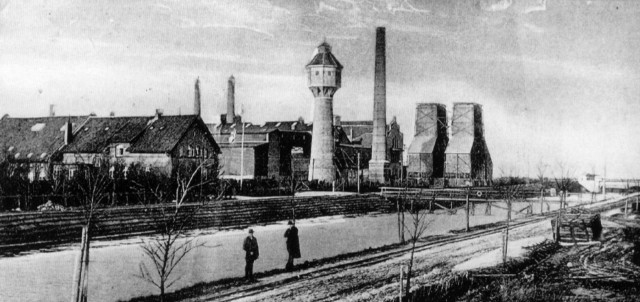
Peat-fired power plant in 1910

In 1906, the Nordgeorgsfehnkanal was constructed through the bog to be able to drain the area. While in the beginning, only specialists and prison labourers came to work by 1907 the first residents to Wiesmoor began to arrive and by 1909 the peat power plant was in operation. The plant was originally owned by Siemens until 1921 when it was taken over by the North West German Power Plants Company (Nordwestdeutschen Kraftwerke AG). The plant provided power all the way from Ems down to the lower Elbe. The waste heat from the power plant was used from 1925 onwards to warm greenhouses to allow the year-round growing of flowers and vegetables, with an area of about 75,000 square meters the greenhouse at Wiesmoor was the largest in Europe at the time.

During the Second World War, it was the location of a forced labour subcamp of the Nazi prison in Emden.

After the war, the Ernst Benary flower company erected a further twenty greenhouses and sowed forty hectares of outdoors area. This can be regarded as the start of Wiesmoor as the ‘Flower City’. Around 40,000 people were visiting the town annually by this time and plans were put down to for the building of a baths, an open-air stage and for the extension of the park into a health establishment. In 1951 the boundaries of Wiesmoor were redrawn, several local villages became part of the towns and the area was incorporated into the district of Aurich. With 51.64 square kilometers, Wiesmoor was now the largest town by area in East Frisia, at this time the town had a total of 5,166 inhabitants.

1952 saw the staging of the first flower festival or Blütenfest in German. In that year the peat power plant was employing around 1,200 people and roughly 120,000 tons of peat was being harvested annually. A Further 200 people worked in the greenhouses, whose products, such as tomatoes and cucumber, were exported into neighboring European countries.

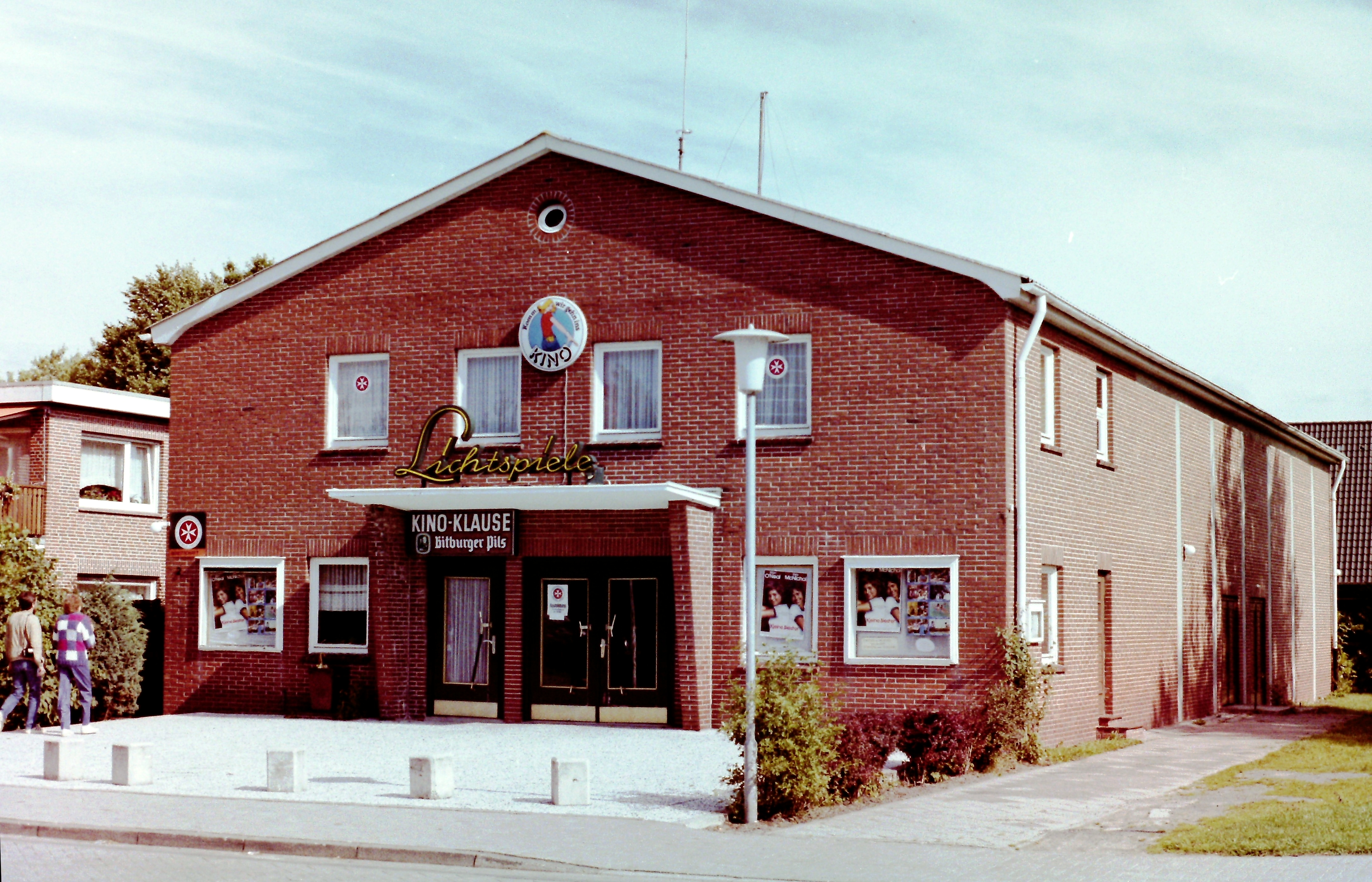
Local cinema in 1982

The peat power plant was dismantled 1966 to be replaced with a larger capacity gas turbine power plant. The loss of jobs caused by the closure of the power plant was helped by the growth of local company Bohlen and Doyen who have grown to become easily the largest employer in the city. In 1972 further changes to local boundaries meant that Wiesmoor continued to grow in size and population by incorporating more local villages. In 1977 the town was designated as a Luftkurort, literally an air spa, due to its high air quality.

In 1995 the gas turbine power plant was demolished.

On 16 March 2006, Wiesmoor was granted city status. Lower Saxony Secretary of the Interior, Uwe Schünemann, delivered the documentation personally and congratulated the city on its rapid growth over the last 100 years.

=== 1989 mid-air collision ===
On Friday 13 January 1989, a half year after the Ramstein Airshow Disaster, there was a collision of several military jets at low altitude over the Hinrichsfehn area of Wiesmoor. A Panavia Tornado ZD891 of 14 Sqn of the Royal Air Force collided with a squadron of German Alphas Jets of the Jagdbombergeschwader 43 division. One of the German Alpha Jets was seriously damaged but managed to make an emergency landing, the a further Alpha Jet and the Tornado were destroyed, the pilot of the Alpha Jet managed to eject but the two pilots in the Tornado died in the accident. The wreckage from the jets landed near a primary school in South Wiesmoor.

British at Bruggen, flying at 150 metres, hit a German military aircraft at 9.50am, of squadron Jagdbombergeschwader 43, and crashed near a village. Both RAF pilots were killed in Wiesmoor. The German pilot, Hermann Späth, aged 38, ejected.

Fl Lt Alan George Grieve, the navigator, was born on 28 May 1960, and was aged 28, from Forres in Moray. He attended Forres Academy, and the University of Aberdeen. His father, George, was a policeman. Alan became a navigator in September 1984. He married in August 1985 at Brechin Cathedral, when a Flying Officer. He had an 18 month old daughter Kirsten. Fl Lt Michael Peter Staveley Smith was born on 26 January 1951, and was aged 37, and married with two sons.

== Subdivisions ==
Administratively, the town of Wiesmoor consists of its town centre and ten further districts (Stadtteile):

- Auricher Wiesmoor II
- Hinrichsfehn
- Marcardsmoor
- Mullberg
- Rammsfehn
- Voßbarg
- Wiesederfehn
- Wilhelmsfehn I
- Wilhelmsfehn II
- Zwischenbergen

== Blütenfest ==
The flower festival in Wiesmoor was first took place in 1952, the festival is held annually on the first weekend in September (from Thursday to Monday). The festival consist of displays of flowers as well as a parade with floats. Each year at the time of the festival a new Blütenkönigin or Blossom Queen is selected. On the Saturday evening of the festival the old Blütenkönigin parachutes over the sports ground which is the signal to start a party which culminates in a large fireworks display. A new Blütenkönigin is selected on the Sunday afternoon and on Monday the festival concludes with the ‘Kanal in Flammen’ (literally canal in flames) which is a large fireworks display held on and around the Nordgeorgsfehnkanal

== See also ==
- Vossbarg
