= Zwischenbergen =

- District of Wiesmoor
- Interactive map of Zwischenbergen
- Location within Germany Location within Lower Saxony
- Coordinates: 53.36395°N 7.68153°E
- Country: Germany
- State: Lower Saxony
- District: Aurich
- City: Wiesmoor

Population
  - Metro: 334
- Time zone: UTC+01:00 (CET)
  - Summer (DST): UTC+02:00 (CEST)
- Postal codes: 26639, 26629
- Dialling codes: 04944, 04946
- Vehicle registration: AUR
- Website: www.zwischenbergen.de

Zwischenbergen is a village and district (Stadtteil) of the East Frisian town of Wiesmoor, in Lower Saxony. It is located approximately six kilometers southwest of the town center.

== History ==
After the land reclamation edict of King Frederick II of Prussia, many new settlements were founded in East Frisia to secure space and livelihood for the growing population. Under the Dutch occupation, the settlement Tüssen Bargen (transl. "Between Mountains") was founded in 1810 between the colony of Voßbarg and Fiebing. It was also popularly known as "the Dutch colony". In the long term, the High German name Zwischenbergen prevailed.

The municipality of Zwischenbergen was incorporated (at least partially) into the municipality of Wiesmoor on 1 July 1972.
