= Wiesederfehn =

- District of Wiesmoor
- Interactive map of Wiesederfehn
- Location within Germany Location within Lower Saxony
- Coordinates: 53.42941°N 7.75795°E
- Country: Germany
- State: Lower Saxony
- District: Aurich
- City: Wiesmoor
- Elevation: 9 m (30 ft)
- Time zone: UTC+01:00 (CET)
  - Summer (DST): UTC+02:00 (CEST)
- Postal codes: 26639
- Dialling codes: 04944
- Vehicle registration: AUR

Wiesederfehn is a small village and district (Stadtteil) of the East Frisian town of Wiesmoor, in Lower Saxony. It is located northeast of the town, along the Bundesstraße 436.

== History ==
Wiesederfehn lends its name to the more northern village of Wiesede. It is an East Frisian moor colony, founded in 1796. In the 19th century, the place belonged to the parish of Reepsholt, and from 1903 to 1914 to the parish of Marcardsmoor. On 1 July 1972, the previously independent community became part of Wiesmoor.
