= Colonias Unidas =

Coordinates: 26°42′S 59°38′W

- City and district
- Interactive map of Colonias Unidas
- Country: Paraguay
- Province: Itapúa Department
- Time zone: UTC−3 (PYT)

Colonias Unidas are a collection of settlements in the Itapúa Department of southern Paraguay founded by German-speaking immigrants in the early 1900s, including the districts of Hohenau, Obligado, Bella Vista.

The population of Colonias Unitas is 36,862 per the 2022 census, with 12,809 in Hohenau, 13,606 in Obligado, and 10,447 in Bella Vista.

== History ==
The first of the Colonias Unidas, Hohenau, was founded on March 14, 1900 by German-Brazilian colonists. Additional German colonists later founded the neighboring municipalities of Obligado in 1912 and Bella Vista in 1918. Initially a colony, Hohenau was recognized by the Paraguayan government as an official district in 1959, followed by Obligado in 1980, and Bella Vista in 1960.

In 1953, 78 farmers formed a cooperative organization called the Cooperativa Colonias Unidas, which supports farming operations, operates fuel stations and grocery stores, and provides health care to the Colonias Unidas.

== Economy and culture ==
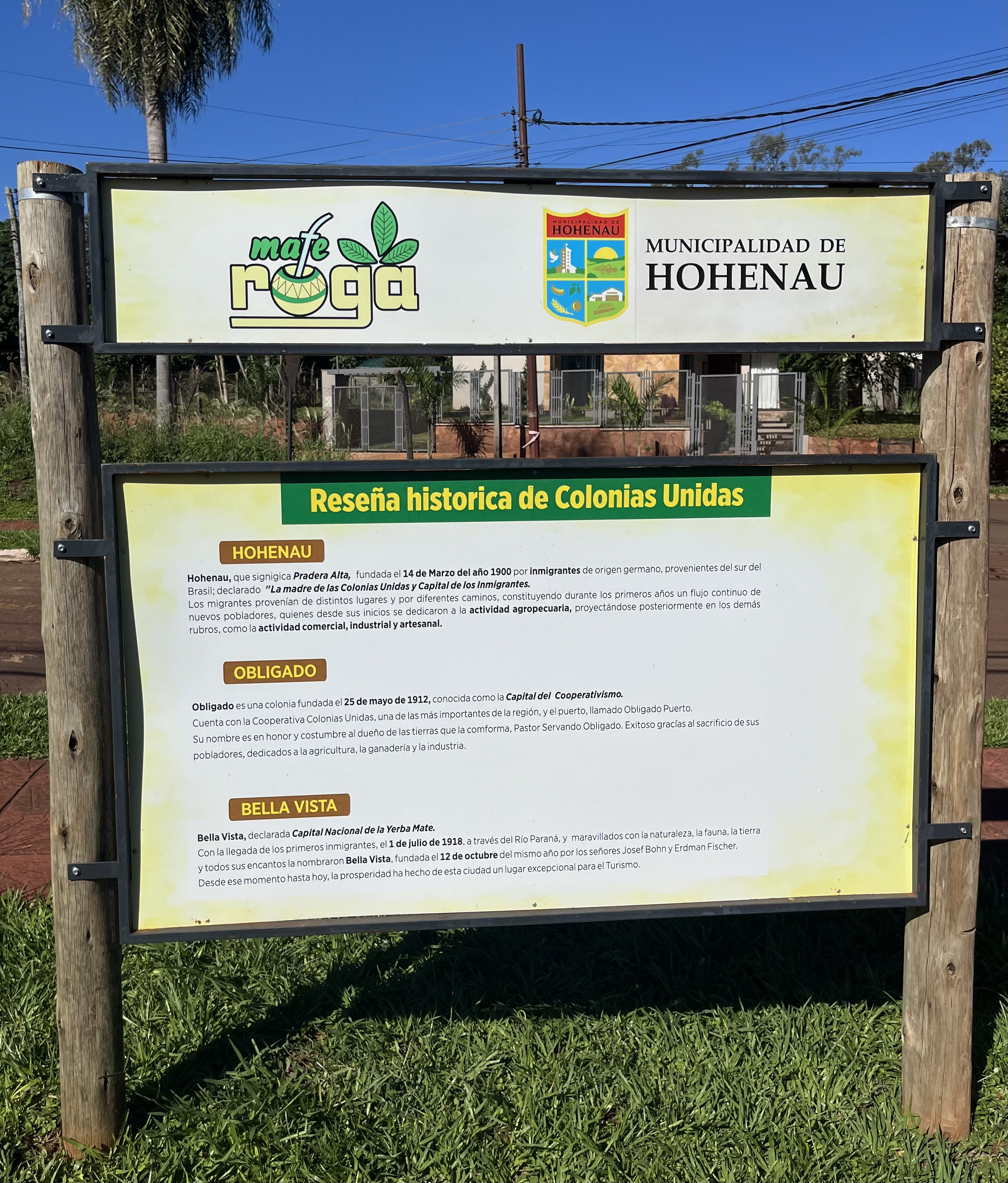
A sign in Hohenau displays information about the history of the Colonias Unidas.

The economy of Colonias Unidas is largely centered on agricultural crops including yerba mate, with Bella Vista known as "Capital Nacional de la Yerba Mate". Additional exports include soybeans, dairy, and pork.

Each district is governed by its own mayor and municipal board, with elections for the five board members occurring every five years, most recently October 10, 2021.

=== Culture ===
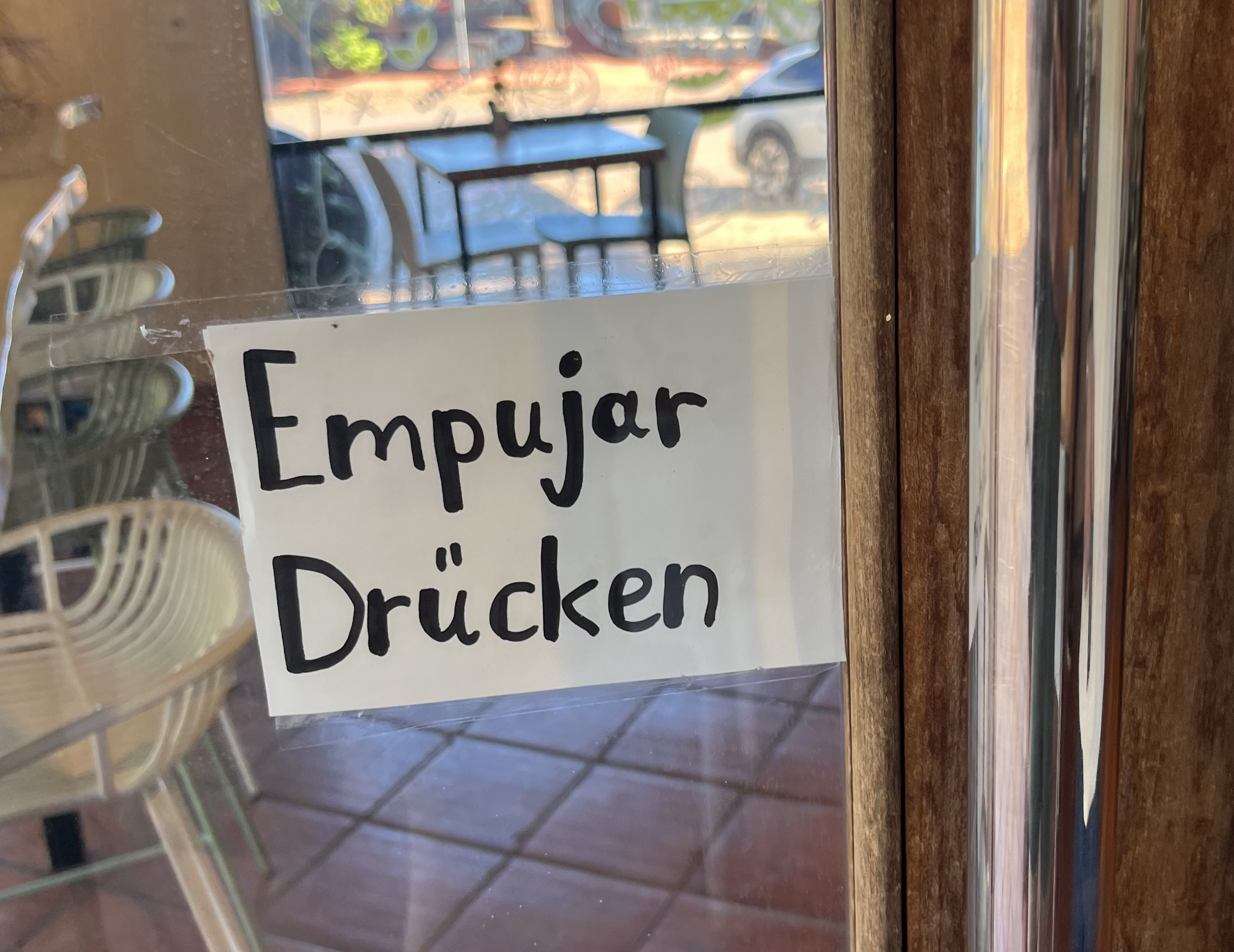
A bilingual German and Spanish sign on the door of a store in Hohenau instructs visitors to push.

Colonias Unidas residents typically speak Paraguayan Spanish with some speaking German, Guarani, and other languages. The colonies celebrate an annual festival in September as well as a local variant of Oktoberfest called Choppfest, and they hosted the 2025 World Rally Championship. Cultural institutions include the Centro Cultural de Edwin Krug, a museum in Hohenau with artifacts from early settlers.
