= List of ambassadors of Germany to Paraguay =

The list of German ambassadors in Paraguay contains the highest-ranking representatives of the German Empire and the Democratic Republic of Germany in Paraguay. The seat of the embassy is Asunción.

== History ==
An embassy was not established in Asunción until 6 May 1922, although diplomatic relations with the Kingdom of Prussia had existed since 1858. Before 1922, the professional consul there acted as chargé d'affaires "for the period when the envoy was not present" (which was almost always the case). The diplomatic representative accredited in Asunción was the envoy in Buenos Aires until 1920 (previously known as the "envoy to the La Plata states"). Paul Goetsch was the first envoy to Montevideo. The charge d'affaires in Asunción was Consul Wolfgang Frank until 14 March 1921 and then Consul Karl Pistor until the opening of the embassy. The consulate in Asunción was not closed during World War I but there was a break off of relations in 1942 during World War II that lasted until 1952.

== German Empire ==
Name	Image	Term Start	Term End	Notes
Paul Goetsch		1920	1922	Envoy
Rudolf von Bülow		1922	1933	Envoy
Fritz Max Weiss		1933	1934	Envoy
Erhard Graf von Wedel		1934	1937	Envoy
Hans Büsing		1937	1941	Envoy; died in office on 20 July 1941.

== Federal Republic of Germany ==
Name	Image	Term Start	Term End	Notes
Julius Borgs-Maciejewski		1952	1959	Embassy opened by West Germany in 1954.
Eckard Briest		1960	1965	
Hubert Krier		1965	1970	
Hanns-Christoph Becker von Sothen		1970	1974	
Hellmut Hoff		1975	1978	
Joseph Engels		1978	1982	
Walter L. Groener		1982	1984	
Konrad Gracher		1984	1986	
Richard Louis		1986	1989	
Heinz Schneppen		1989	1993	
Joachim Kausch		1993	1997	
Josef Rusnak		1997	2001	
Peter Kiewitt		2001	2004	
Horst-Wolfram Kerll		2004	2007	
Dietmar Blaas		2007	2010	
Claude Robert Ellner		2010	2014	
Johannes Trommer		2014	2016	
Claudius Fischbach		2016	2020	
Holger Scherf		2020	Present	
