= Hans Büsing =

German diplomat

- Born: 11 February 1880; Schwerin, Mecklenburg-Schwerin, German Empire
- Died: 20 July 1941 (aged 61); Asunción, Paraguay
- Education: University of Tübingen
- Occupation: Diplomat

Hans Carl Paul Eduard Büsing (11 February 1880 – 20 July 1941) was a German diplomat who served as Minister to Finland and Minister to Paraguay.

== Early life and education ==
Born in Schwerin in the Grand Duchy of Mecklenburg-Schwerin on 11 February 1880, after school education Büsing studied law at the University of Tübingen. While at university in 1899 he was a member of the Corps Suevia Tübingen. In 1902 Büsing started his career at the Ministry of Justice, receiving his doctor of law in 1903, but after a few years switched his career to the German Foreign Office in 1910.

== Diplomatic career ==
In 1911 his first posting was as Consul-General in London operating under Ambassador Paul Wolff Metternich until in 1912 when he was transferred as acting Consul in Cape Town in the absence of Consul-General Hans Paul von Humboldt-Dachroeden. In December 1913 he was appointed as Consul-General in Monrovia, Liberia. Büsing served in Liberia until the outbreak of the First World War in late 1914 when he signed up for active military service. However the foreign office retained him in service and appointed him Consul-General in Esbjerg, Denmark and then to Christiania, Sweden in 1916 followed by an appointment as Legation Counsellor in Stockholm in 1917 under Minister Hellmuth Lucius von Stoedten.

In 1918 he returned to work in the Foreign Office in Berlin, but in 1921 was appointed Consul-General in Canton until late 1923. In November 1923 he was appointed as Consul-General to Australia, being the first German diplomat to be posted there since the war. Initially based in Melbourne, in 1928 he moved the consulate back to Sydney. As the German consul, Büsing attempted to repair German relations with Australians and spoke out against the treatment of German property in Australia confiscated during the war by the Australian Government. On 15 July 1932 Büsing was sent to Helsinki as Minister to Finland, serving until 1935. On 12 February 1937 Büsing received his last diplomatic appointment to Asunción as Minister to Paraguay, where he died on 20 July 1941.

Diplomatic posts
New title	Consul-General of Germany for Australia; 1923 – 1932	Succeeded by Rudolf Asmis
Preceded by Martin Renner	German Minister to Finland; 1932 – 1935	Succeeded by Wipert von Blücher
Preceded by Erhard Graf von Wedel	German Minister to Paraguay; 1937 – 1941	Succeeded by ????
