= Obligado =

- City and district
- Location within Paraguay
- Coordinates: 27°1′48″S 55°37′48″W
- Country: Paraguay
- Department: Itapúa Department

Population (2017)
  - Total: 16,605

Obligado is a city and district in the Itapúa Department of Paraguay and one of the Colonias Unidas. It has been called "Capital City of Cooperativism" and the industrial capital of Itapúa.

== History ==
The city was founded on May 25, 1912, by German colonists who bought the land from Argentine pastor Servando Obligado. It was reclassified as district on June 20, 1955.

Obligado, together with Hohenau and Bella Vista, makes up a cluster of districts in Itapúa called Colonias Unidas for their industrial work.
