= Marcardsmoor =

- District of Wiesmoor
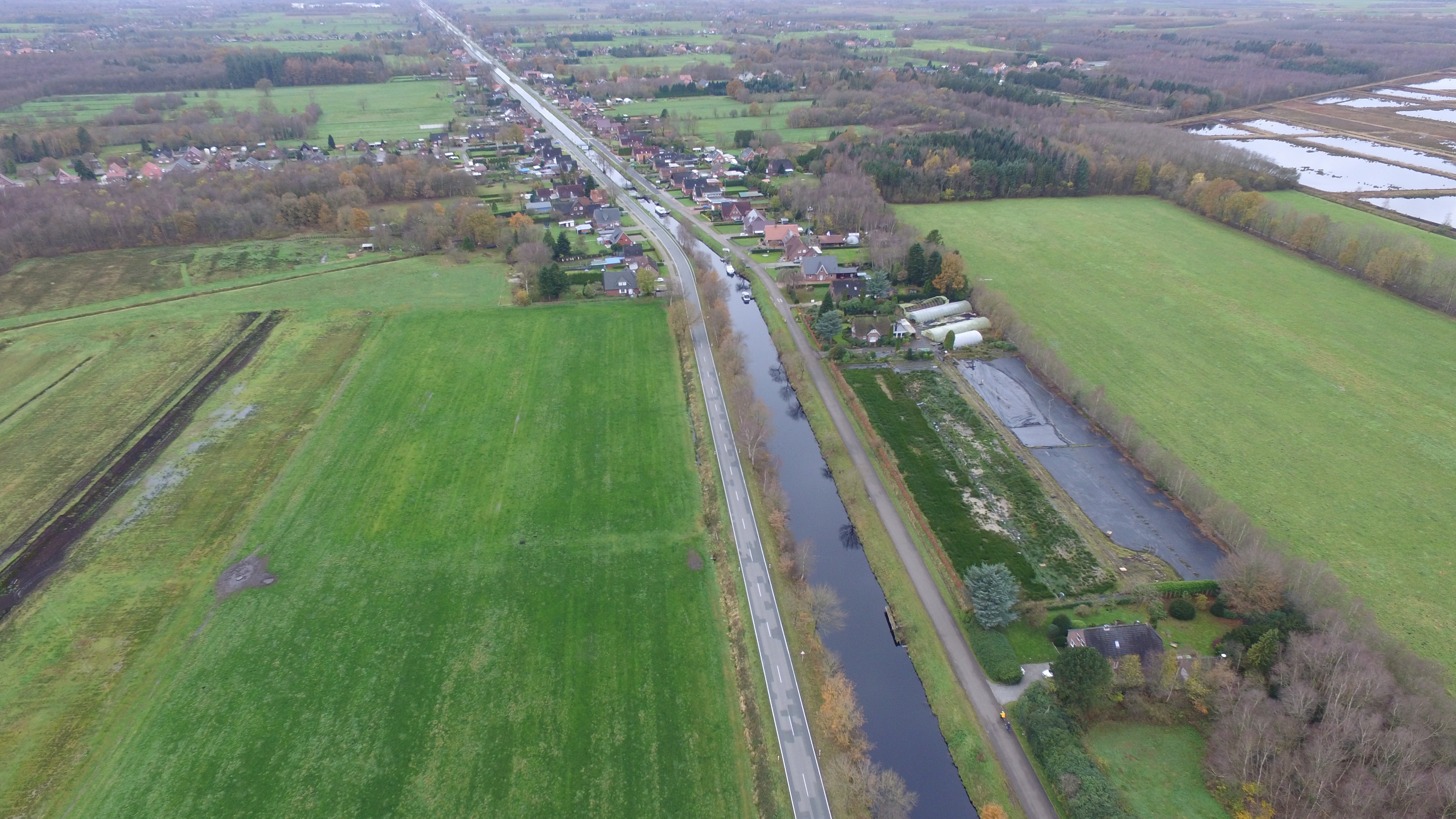
- Aerial view of Marcardsmoor
- Interactive map of Marcardsmoor
- Location within Germany Location within Lower Saxony
- Coordinates: 53.46112°N 7.71851°E
- Country: Germany
- State: Lower Saxony
- District: Aurich
- City: Wiesmoor

Area
  - District of Wiesmoor: 13.88 km^{2} (5.36 sq mi)
- Elevation: 12 m (39 ft)

Population
  - Metro: 875
- Time zone: UTC+01:00 (CET)
  - Summer (DST): UTC+02:00 (CEST)
- Postal codes: 26639
- Dialling codes: 04948
- Vehicle registration: AUR
- Website: www.marcardsmoor.de

Marcardsmoor is a village and district (Stadtteil) of the East Frisian town of Wiesmoor, in Lower Saxony. It is located north of the town, on the intersection of the Ems-Jade Canal and the Nordgeorgsfehn Canal.

== History ==
The village was the first to be established in the late 19th century according to the so-called "Deutschen Hochmoorkultur". This envisaged that agricultural use should be made possible after the raised bog had been drained with the help of artificial fertilizer. After the Ems-Jade Canal was built between 1880 and 1888, the Prussian Central Moor Commission began cultivating an area of around 2,100 hectares to the north and south of the canal. Until then, Marcardsmoor was only inhabited by a bridge and lock keeper on the canal. Settlers and prisoners took on the reclamation of the moor. They dug drainage ditches into the moor at a right angle to the canal running east–west. Five settlers were counted in 1890, and by 1900 another 29 had followed. In 1906, construction of the Nordgeorgsfehn Canal began from Marcardsmoor, which enabled the settlement of what is now the core area of Wiesmoor.

After further growth, the state-owned Gutsbezirk of Marcardsmoor was converted into an independent municipality in 1924. It belonged to the Wittmund district and was named after the former Undersecretary of State in the Prussian Ministry of Agriculture Eduard von Marcard, who had dealt extensively with the cultivation of raised bogs and was temporarily chairman of the Central Moor Commission.

In 1951, the area was ceded from the Wittmund district to the Aurich district. Marcardsmoor has been part of Wiesmoor since 1 July 1972.

== Sights ==
There is a church in the village, the Holy Cross Church (German: Kreuzkirche). The raw brick church building in neo-Gothic style was built in 1907.

== Gallery ==
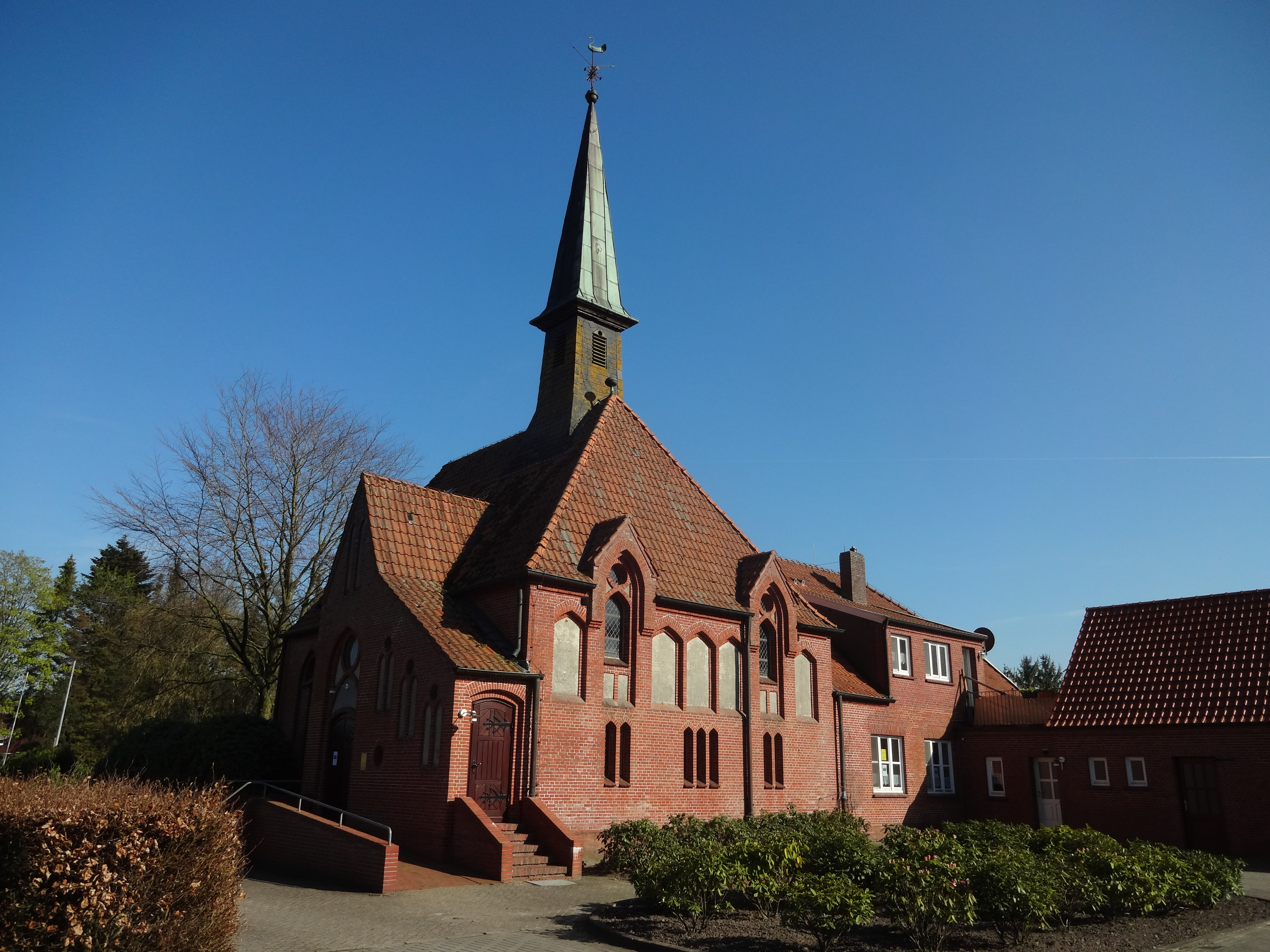
Holy Cross Church

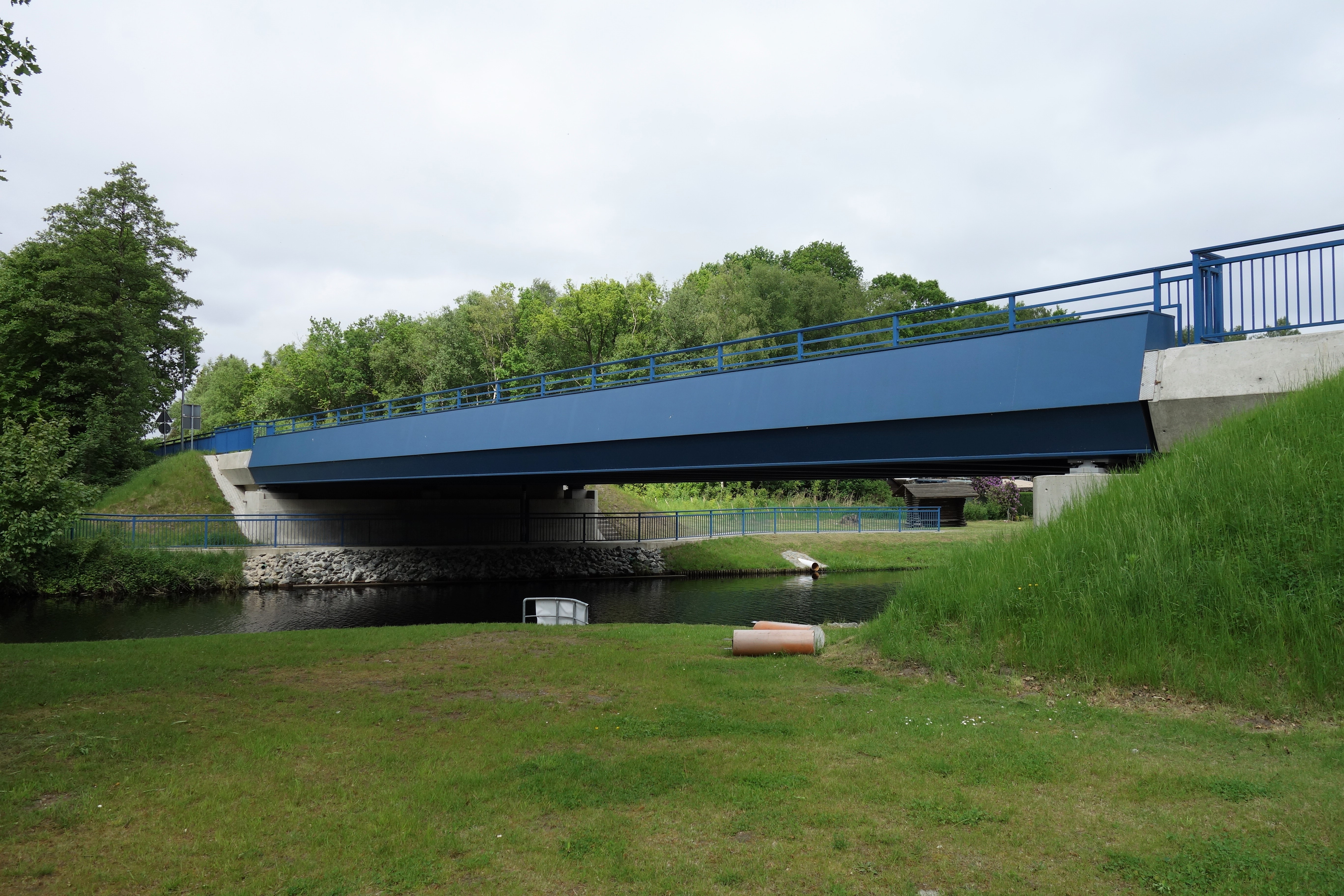
Eduard von Marcard Bridge

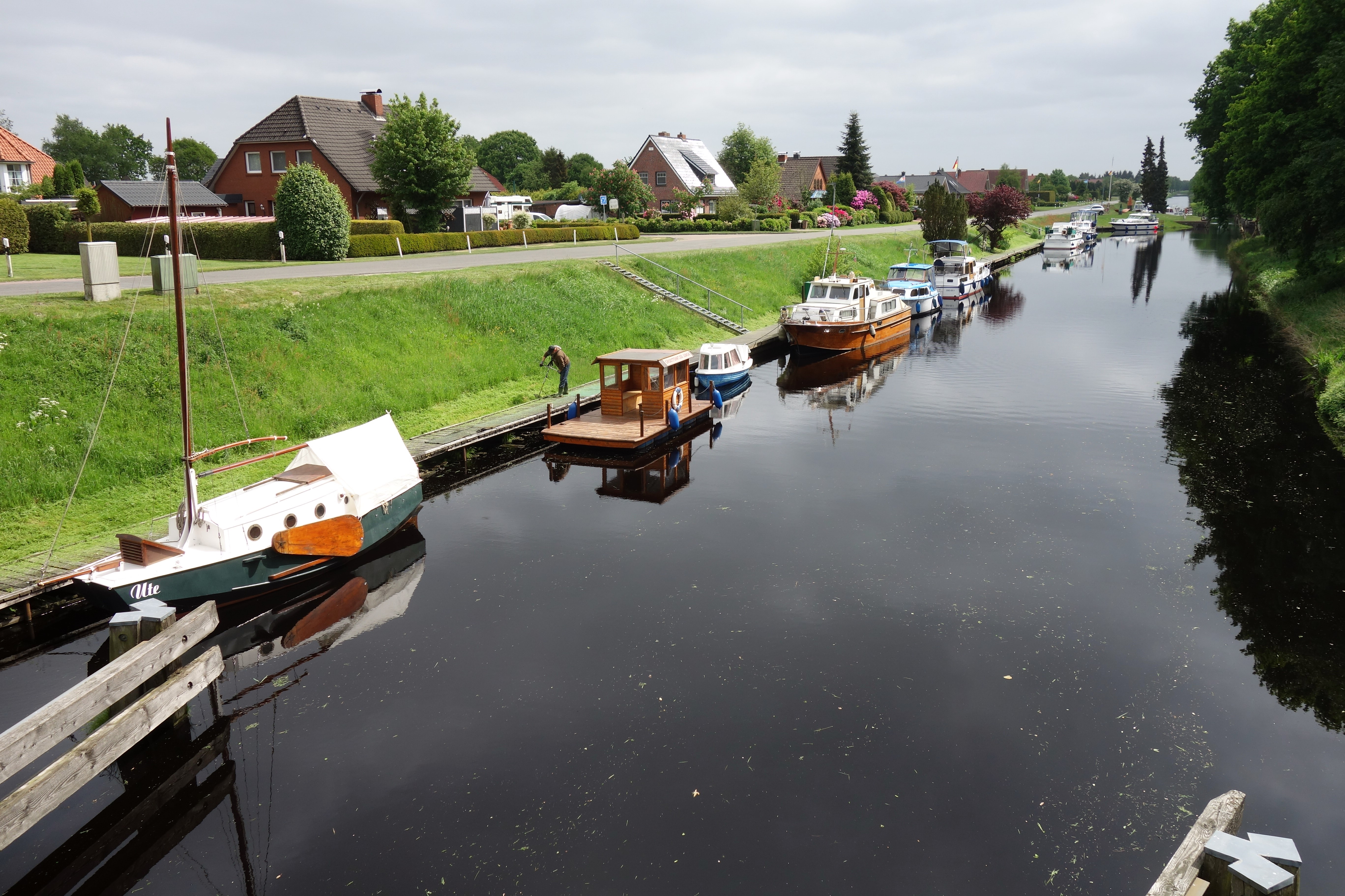
Marcardsmoor from the Nordgeorgsfehn Canal
