= Hinrichsfehn =

- District of Wiesmoor
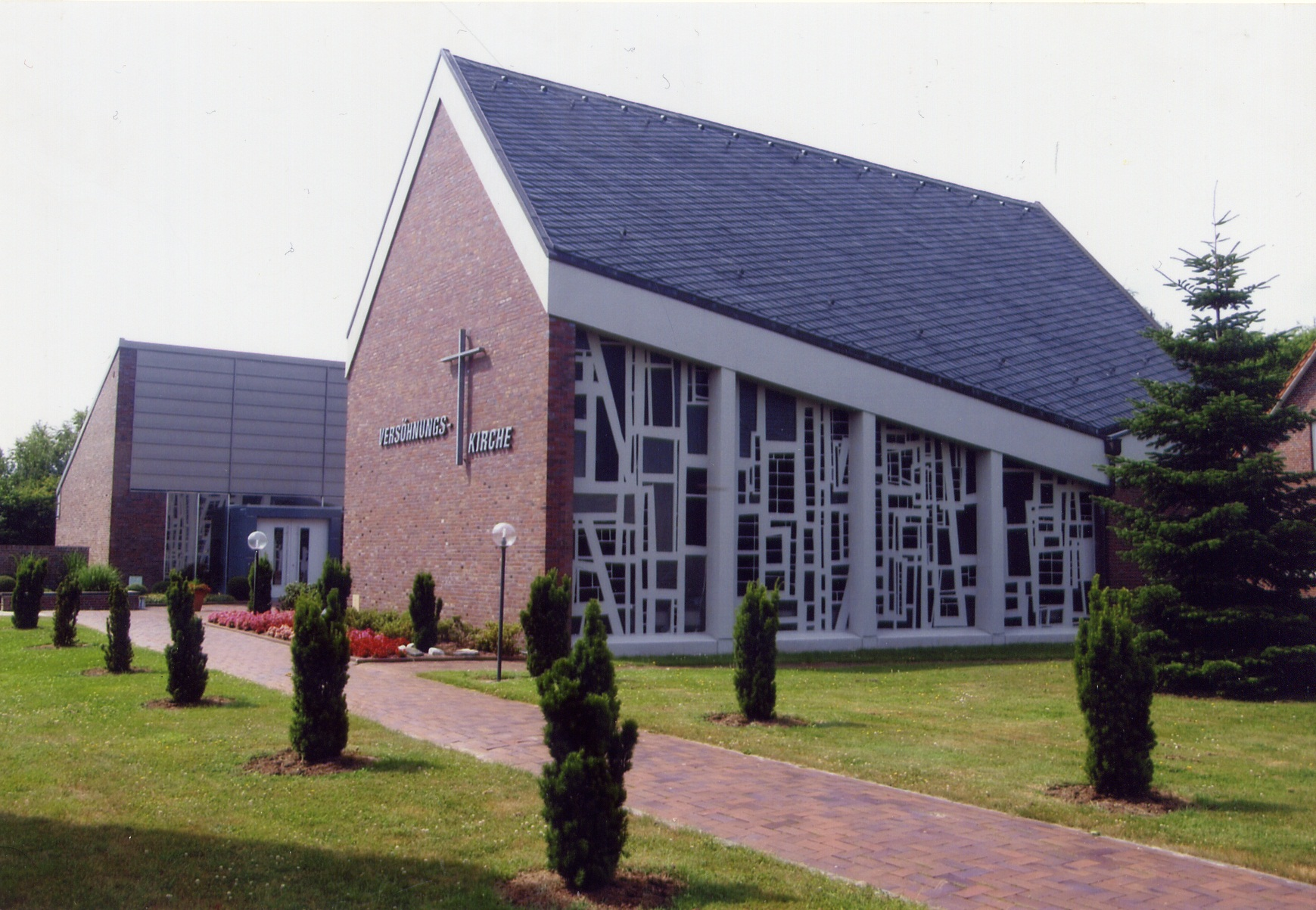
- Church of Reconciliation
- Interactive map of Hinrichsfehn
- Location within Germany Location within Lower Saxony
- Coordinates: 53.37607°N 7.73301°E
- Country: Germany
- State: Lower Saxony
- District: Aurich
- City: Wiesmoor
- Elevation: 11 m (36 ft)

Population
  - Metro: 1,000
- Time zone: UTC+01:00 (CET)
  - Summer (DST): UTC+02:00 (CEST)
- Postal codes: 26639
- Dialling codes: 04944
- Vehicle registration: AUR
- Website: www.hinrichsfehn.de

Hinrichsfehn is a district (Stadtteil) of the East Frisian town of Wiesmoor, in Lower Saxony. It is located south of the town and west of the Nordgeorgsfehn Canal.

== History ==
The district is the youngest of Wiesmoor and was only created after the Second World War. The initiator of the establishment of the settlement was the director of the peat power plant of the electricity company Nordwestdeutsche Kraftwerke, Jan Hinrichs. The settlement was named after him.

The land on which the district was built had already been cultivated. The first 63 houses in the new district were built from peat sod and clay and covered with thatch. By 1960 the district had grown to 830 people, which led to a school being built in 1951 and the founding of the Hinrichsfehn sports club in 1955. In 1965 the Evangelical Lutheran Church of Reconciliation (German: Versöhnungskirche) was consecrated as a branch church of the Wiesmoor Church. In 1987 it became the church of the independent Hinrichsfehn Church of Reconciliation.
