= Albert von Bülow =

German officer (1829–1892)

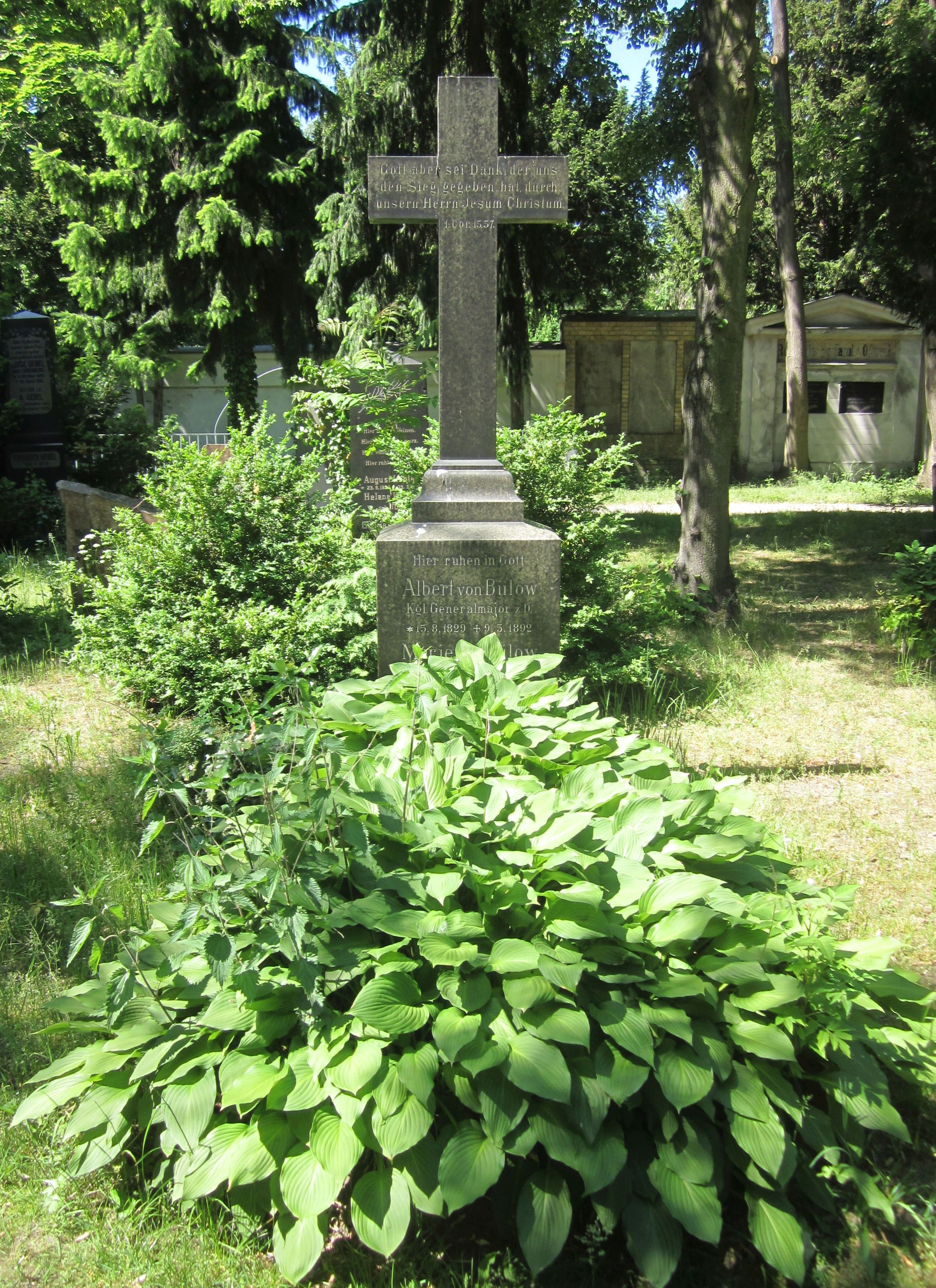
The grave of major general Albert von Bülow (1829–1892), Cemetery I of Trinity Church in Berlin-Kreuzberg.

Ernst Friedrich Albert von Bülow (15 August 1829 – 9 May 1892) was a Prussian major general.

== Early life ==
Albert von Bülow, was born on 15 August 1829 in Berlin. He came from the von Bülow family in the Mecklenburg nobility. He was the second son of the Royal Prussian Legation Councilor Friedrich Karl von Bülow (1789–1853) and, his second wife, Ida Pauline Natalie von Carlowitz (1806–1872). Among his siblings were brothers Otto von Bülow, the diplomat, and Karl Adolf Leopold von Bülow, the General Adjutant and Royal Prussian General of the Cavalry.

Among his extended family were Bernhard Ernst von Bülow, the State Secretary for Foreign Affairs, and Prince Bernhard von Bülow, Chancellor of the German Empire from 1900 to 1909.

== Career ==
In April 1847, Bülow joined the 1st Foot Guards Regiment of the Prussian Army as an ensign. He received his commission as a Second lieutenant in May 1849 and attended the Prussian Staff College from 1852 to 1855.

He fought in the Second Schleswig War in 1864. Bülow commanded the 2nd Magdeburg Infantry Regiment No. 27 from May 1880 to May 1885 and was then promoted to Major general with a statutory pension.

== Personal life ==
In 1866 he married Baroness Marie Friederike Emilie Karoline von Meerheimb (1835–1925) in Jürgenshagen. She was a daughter of Friedrich von Meerheimbug and Emilie Kleist von Meerheimbug. Together, they were the parents of several children, including:

- Friedrich August Otto Karl von Bülow (1868–1936), who married Baroness Irmgard Lewine Hedwig Auguste Alma Bertha Anna von Hammerstein-Loxten, daughter of Prussian Agriculture Minister Ernst von Hammerstein-Loxten.
- Rudolf von Bülow (1873–1955), who became a diplomat and served as the German ambassador to Paraguay.

Bülow died in Berlin in 1892.
