= Colegio Goethe =

Coordinates: 25.2832°S 57.5559°W

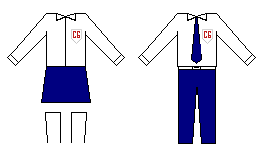
- Asunción; Paraguay

Information
- Type: German international school
- Founded: 1893; 133 years ago
- Grades: Pre-primary education through bachillerato
- Language: German
- Website: www.goethe.edu.py

Colegio Goethe (German: Deutsche Schule Asunción, Goethe-Schule) is a German international school in Asunción, Paraguay. The school serves pre-primary education through bachillerato/Abitur-level (senior high school) education.

== History ==
The school was founded by German immigrants in 1893. A Protestant church was founded at the same time.

== See also ==
- Germans in Paraguay
