= Otto von Bülow (diplomat) =

German diplomat (1827–1901)

His Excellence Otto von Bülow
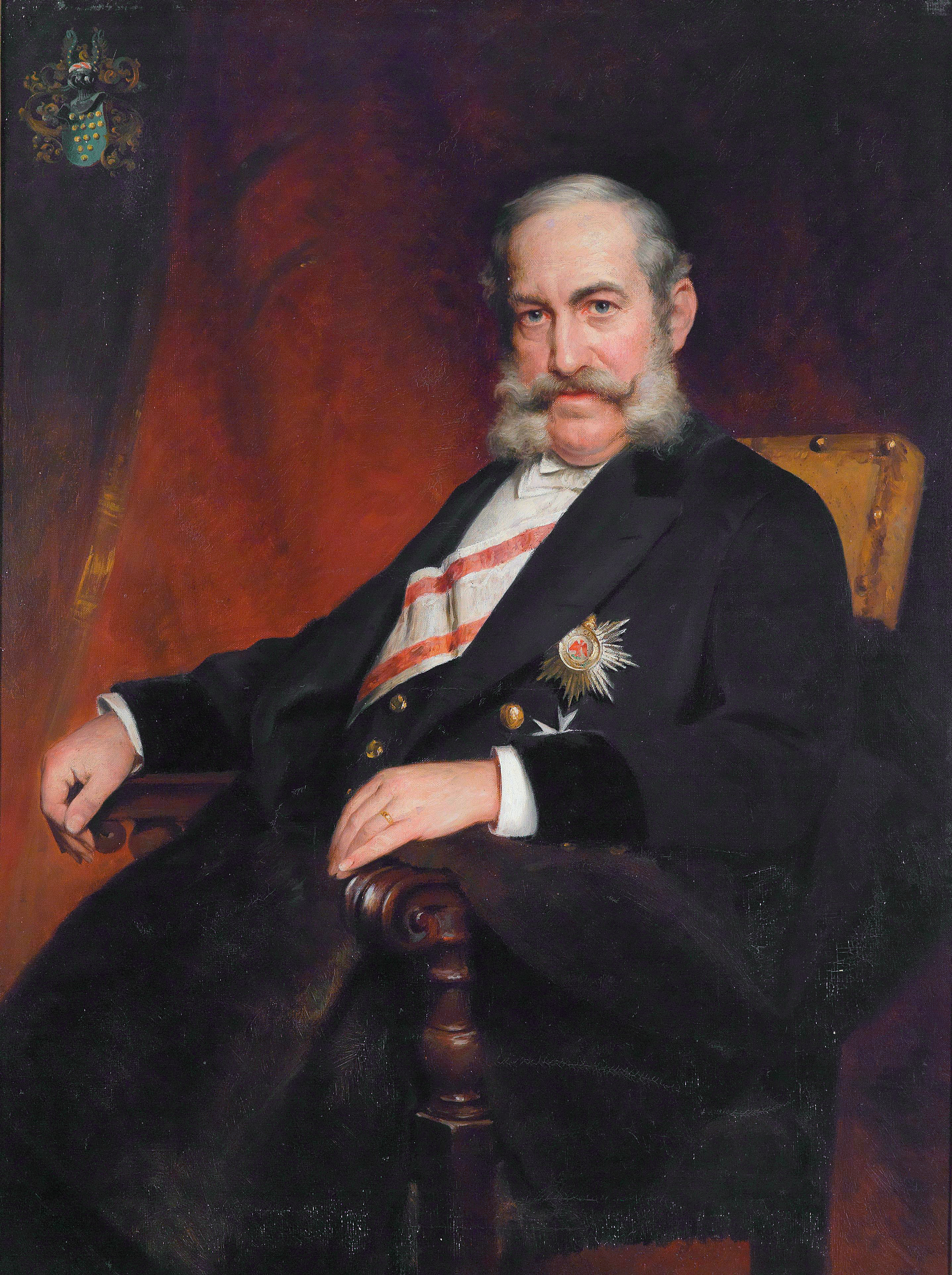
- Portrait of von Bülow, Georg Lampe

German Envoy to the Holy See
- In office 1892–1898
- Preceded by: Kurd von Schlözer

German Ambassador to Switzerland
- In office 1882–1892
- Preceded by: Heinrich von Roeder
- Succeeded by: Clemens Busch

Personal details
- Born: Hans Otto Theodor von Bülow; 28 December 1827 Frankfurt am Main
- Died: 22 November 1901 (aged 73) Rome
- Spouse(s): Marie Meyer (m. 1858; died 1861) Martha Florowna von Schele (m. 1865; died 1891)
- Relations: Bernhard Ernst von Bülow (uncle); Bernhard von Bülow (cousin)
- Children: 2
- Parent(s): Friedrich Karl von Bülow; Ida Pauline Natalie von Carlowitz

Hans Otto Theodor von Bülow (28 December 1827 – 22 November 1901) was a German diplomat.

== Early life ==
Hans Otto Theodor von Bülow, generally called Otto von Bülow, was born on 28 December 1827 in Frankfurt am Main. He came from the von Bülow family in the Mecklenburg nobility. He was the eldest son of the Royal Prussian Legation Councilor Friedrich Karl von Bülow (1789–1853) and, his second wife, Ida Pauline Natalie von Carlowitz (1806–1872). Among his siblings were brothers Ernst Friedrich Albert von Bülow, the Royal Prussian Major general, and Karl Adolf Leopold von Bülow, the General Adjutant and Royal Prussian General of the Cavalry.

Among his extended family were Bernhard Ernst von Bülow, the State Secretary for Foreign Affairs, and Prince Bernhard von Bülow, Chancellor of the German Empire from 1900 to 1909.

Bülow studied law at Friedrich-Wilhelms-Universität in Berlin, Ruprecht-Karls-Universität in Heidelberg, and University of Halle in Saale. He was a member of the Corps Neoborussia-Berlin in c. 1844 and the Corps Marchia Halle in 1849 and in the Corps Saxo-Borussia Heidelberg in 1850.

== Career ==
After completing his studies, he entered the three-stage Prussian post-university training in 1851 as an auscultator (trainee lawyer), which he completed in 1853. He was promoted to Assessor in c. 1856. A year later he worked as an auxiliary expedient in the Prussian Foreign Office, where ten years later he was promoted to expedient, a kind of secretary in the civil service. In 1862 he was appointed as a candidate for legation councilor in Prussia's diplomatic service. This was followed in 1867 by his appointment to the Real Legation Council and the Lecturing Council (described as a higher civil service). In 1872, he was appointed Privy Legation Councilor. From 1880 onwards, von Bülow was integrated into the diplomatic service in the Prussian-German Empire as a Real Privy Legation Councilor, at the time of the first Chancellor of the German Empire, Prince Otto von Bismarck.

From 1881 to 1882 he was the Prussian ambassador to the Württemberg in Stuttgart. From 1882 onwards he was appointed as ambassador to Switzerland in Bern, where von Bülow received further promotion, which entitled him to use the title of Real Privy Councilor, with the title of Excellence, from 1890 onwards. In this role he was involved in the negotiations of the Berne Convention. Due to disagreements between Kaiser Wilhelm II and the Reich Chancellor and Prussian Prime Minister Bismarck, which led to Bismarck's resignation at Wilhelm II's insistence on 18 March 1890 and personnel changes in the diplomatic service. The generally difficult relationship between the Holy See and the religiously reformed Prussia also led to disagreements in the German diplomatic Corps, which is why the Prussian envoy to the Vatican, Kurd von Schlözer was replaced in 1892 with von Bülow as distinguished envoy to the Holy See in the Vatican, holding the office of Prussian ambassador until his retirement in 1898.

== Personal life ==
On 3 August 1858, von Bülow was married Marie Meyer (1828–1861) in Berlin. Before her death on 24 December 1861 in Berlin, they were the parents of one son:

- Ernst Otto Wilhelm Friedrich Nikolaus Albert von Bülow (1859–1915), a Judge at the International Court of Justice in Alexandria; he married Anna Christine Elsa Schricker in 1895 in Strasbourg.

After the death of his first wife, he married Martha Florowna von Doliva-Dobrovolsky (1830–1891), widow of Eugen von Schele and daughter of Florian Dolivo-Dobrovolsky, on 4 October 1865, in St. Petersburg, Russia. Together, they were the parents of a daughter:

- Marie Pauline Viktoria von Bülow (1866–1944), who married Dr. Rudolf von Scala, a professor at the University of Graz, in 1898.

His second wife Martha died on 20 February 1891. Bülow died on 22 November 1901 in Rome and was buried in the Protestant Cemetery there.
