= Vossbarg =

Vossbarg Voßbarg
- District of Wiesmoor
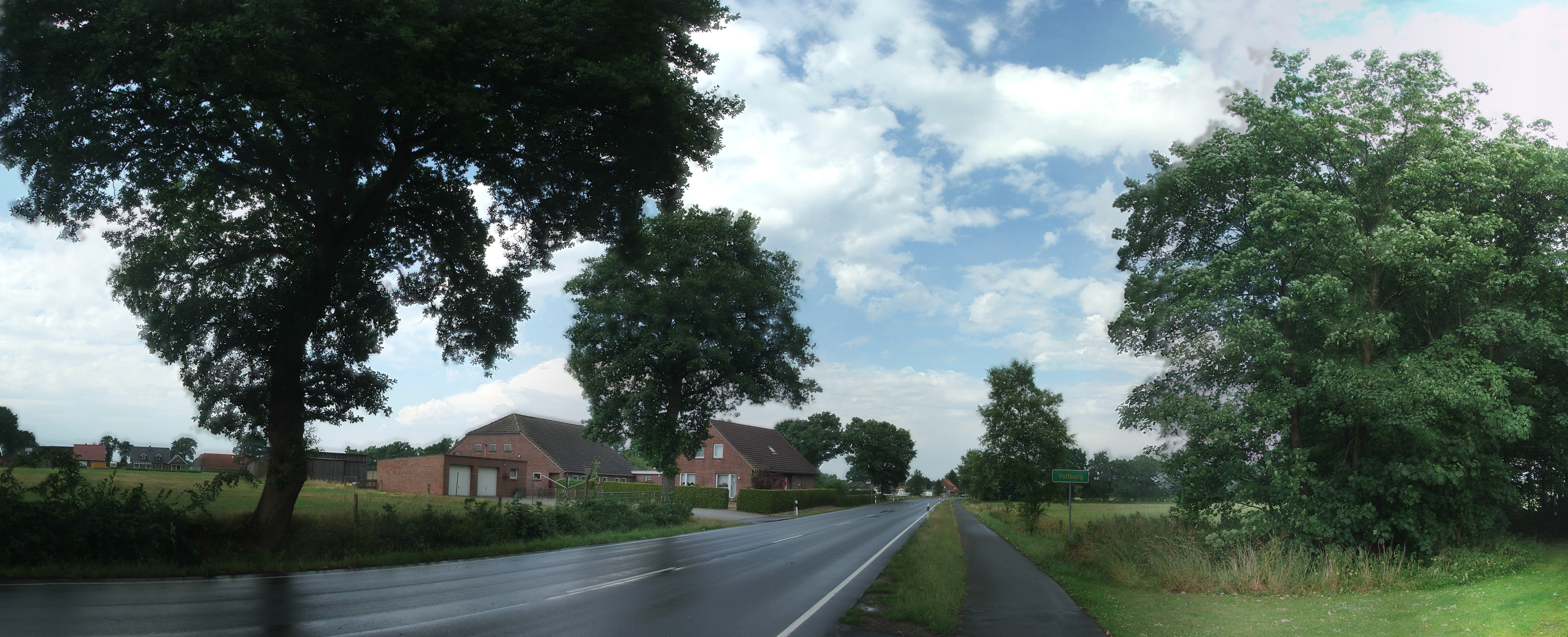
- Entry of Vossbarg
- Interactive map of Vossbarg
- Location within Germany Location within Lower Saxony
- Coordinates: 53.39440°N 7.70397°E
- Country: Germany
- State: Lower Saxony
- District: Aurich
- City: Wiesmoor
- Elevation: 10 m (33 ft)
- Time zone: UTC+01:00 (CET)
  - Summer (DST): UTC+02:00 (CEST)
- Postal codes: 26639
- Dialling codes: 04944
- Vehicle registration: AUR

Vossbarg (also spelled Voßbarg) is a row village in East Frisia, Germany. It is a Moorland colony consisting mostly of pasture land and is predominantly an agricultural area.

== History ==
After the reclamation edict of King Frederick II of Prussia, many new settlements were created in East Frisia.

In 1780, after two years of debate for rights to the land, the first piece of land, 3 Diemat (about 1.5 hectares) in area, was awarded to Rencke Janssen. Following him were other settlers Claas Janssen, Otto Christoffers, January Focken and Harm Habben. Vossbarg initially belonged Strackholt, a town to the west, but few years later, in 1787, Vossbarg emerged as an independent municipality.

The first Moorland lived as farmers of the cultivation of wheat. Starting from 1824 some craftsmen, carpenters, restaurant operators/barkeepers, cutters, bakers, and shoemakers began to settle in Vossbarg. Peat was harvested for personal fuel needs, however, there was no canal present and transportation of large quantities of peat became nearly impossible. After some years the moorland soil became depleted. The town, which had a promising beginning, began to experience poverty. The heads of families hired themselves out as day laborers to the moor companies in the neighboring towns of Spetzerfehn and Großefehn. Others sought work as harvest hands in the marsh areas or in the Netherlands. During time, Vossbarg citizens were persuaded to emigrate to America in response to the other citizens who had emigrated there. Between 1850 and 1900 numerous residents of Vossbarg emigrated because of the economic and political difficulties.

By the end of the 19th century, the situation in Vossbarg had improved. Artificial fertilizers were in use and the crop yields had increased. A particular blessing for Vossbarg was the founding of the power-station at Wiesmoor. Many men and women were employed there for the production of peat.

== Modern ==
In 1972, Vossbarg came under the jurisdiction of Wiesmoor as a result of the district reforms instituted by the state of Lower Saxony.

Through the efforts of the villagers, the 200th anniversary of the founding of Vossbarg was celebrated in 1987. Heinz Saathoff, the Vossbarg village manager, published an anniversary booklet for the occasion. Richard Ahlrichs, a teacher and native of Vossbarg, wrote the text. Numerous old photos and documents were produced by the residents and printed in the booklet or displayed in the school building of Vossbarg. The entire community was spruced up festively for the occasion. In 1972, Vossbarg came under the jurisdiction of Wiesmoor as a result of the district reforms instituted by the state of Lower Saxony.
