= Wilhelmsfehn II =

- District of Wiesmoor
- Interactive map of Wilhelmsfehn II
- Location within Germany Location within Lower Saxony
- Coordinates: 53.40981°N 7.69183°E
- Country: Germany
- State: Lower Saxony
- District: Aurich
- City: Wiesmoor
- Time zone: UTC+01:00 (CET)
  - Summer (DST): UTC+02:00 (CEST)
- Postal codes: 26639
- Dialling codes: 04944
- Vehicle registration: AUR

Wilhelmsfehn II is a district (Stadtteil) of the East Frisian town of Wiesmoor, in Lower Saxony. A linear settlement, it is located west of the town, to the south of Wilhelmsfehn I.

== History ==
The settlement was founded in 1878. In that year, canals reaching into the Ostfriesische Zentralhochmoor ("East Frisian central raised bog") such as the Norderwieke and the Süderwieke were extended eastwards. The moor colony was named after Emperor Wilhelm I.

In contrast to Wilhelmsfehn I, the development of the place came to a standstill. Both canals now end in the moor and were not connected to the Nordgeorgsfehn Canal as originally planned. The reason for this is seen as changed economic conditions, especially the decline of the peat shipping that had been intensively operated until then. In 1931, the village, which remained an estate district (Gutsbezirk) under municipal law, received its own school. In 1951 it was added to the greater municipality of Wiesmoor.
