= Fritz Max Weiss =

German diplomat (1877–1955)

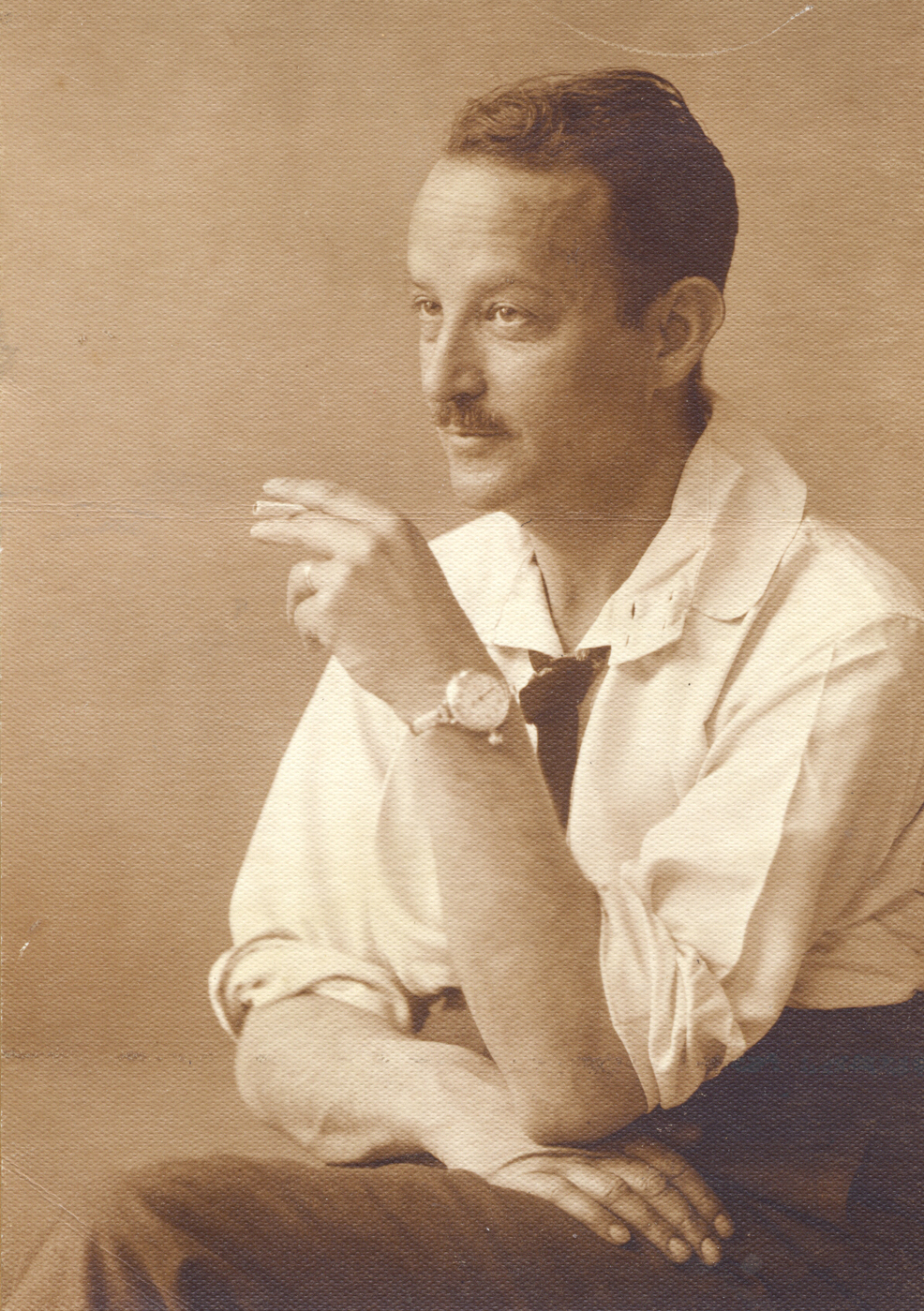

Personal details
- Born: Max Friedrich Weiss; 23 February 1877 Zurich, Switzerland
- Died: 22 October 1955 (aged 76) Heidelberg, West Germany (now Germany)
- Citizenship: Switzerland; Germany
- Spouse: Hedwig Sonnenburg (m. 1911)
- Children: 3
- Education: University of Zurich; University of Berlin
- Occupation: Diplomat, jurist, orientalist, translator

Max Friedrich "Fritz" Weiss since 1951 Max Friedrich Wyss (23 February 1877 – 22 October 1955) was a Swiss-born German diplomat, jurist and orientalist.

== Early life and education ==
Weiss was born 23 February 1877 in Zurich, Switzerland, the son of Heinrich "Emil" Weiss (1830–1904), an executive director of Swiss Northeastern Railway, and German-born Ludmilla Aschenberg (widowed Askunas; born 1847), who was of German Jewish descent but had assimilated to Protestantism. Through his mother, Weiss had three older half-siblings.

His maternal family originally hailed from Fehraltorf in the Zürcher Oberland, where they belonged to the local bourgeoisie since the 16th century and were mainly active as merchants, officials and educators. Since 1846, they held municipal citizenship of Winterthur. Upon the death of his grandfather in 1848, Emil Weiss, became a protégé of Alfred Escher. His mother originally hailed from a German Jewish family in Köthen and spent her early adulthood married in St. Kilda, Victoria.

He was primarily raised in Cologne where he completed his Abitur at Friedrich Wilhelm Gymnasium. From 1896 to 1899, Weiss studied law at the University of Zurich and the University of Berlin. In 1898, he obtained a higher diploma in Chinese, and ultimately became a translator.

== Personal life ==
In 1911, Weiss married Hedwig Margarete Sonnenburg (1889–1955), a daughter of Dr. Eduard Sonnenburg (1848–1915) and Anna Marianne Caroline Sonnenburg (née Westphal; 1864–1943), with whom he had three children:

- Jutta Ludmilla Clara Fanny Margarete Weiss (1914–1969), married Swiss-born François Michel Simon (1917–1982), an actor, of Geneva, Switzerland.
- Alice Ludmilla Weiss (1916–2002), married Philip Rhein (1908–2000)
- Dieter Eduard Heinrich Yäshuana Weiss (1923–1994), a psychiatrist and professor, married to Ursula Daecke (1919–2000), had one daughter Tamara Wyss (1950–2016), a documentary film maker.

In 1951, Weiss officially changed the family name to Wyss, which is the more original Swiss spelling, it is assumed that he also held Swiss citizenship by paternal descent.
