= Hohenau, Paraguay =

Hohenau
- City and district
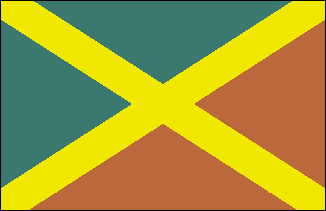
- Flag

- Location in Paraguay
- Coordinates: 27°04′43″S 55°38′43″W
- Country: Paraguay
- Department: Itapúa
- Founded: March 14, 1900
- Founder: Carlos Reverchon, Guillermo Closs, Ambrosio Scholler and Esteban Scholler, helped by German colonists

Area
  - Total: 220 km^{2} (85 sq mi)

Population (2008)
  - Total: 11,044
  - Density: 50/km^{2} (130/sq mi)
- Time zone: UTC-4
- Postal code: 6290
- Area code: (595) (75)

Hohenau is a city and district of the Itapúa Department, Paraguay, and was the first of the Colonias Unidas. It was founded as a colony in 1900 by settlers of German descent, and maintains a significant population of German Paraguayans. The city has a largely agricultural economy and is known for yerba mate production. The population is 12,809 according to the 2022 census.

== Name ==
The name Hohenau translates to 'high meadow' in German, from the German hoch 'high' and Au(e) 'floodplain'.

== History ==
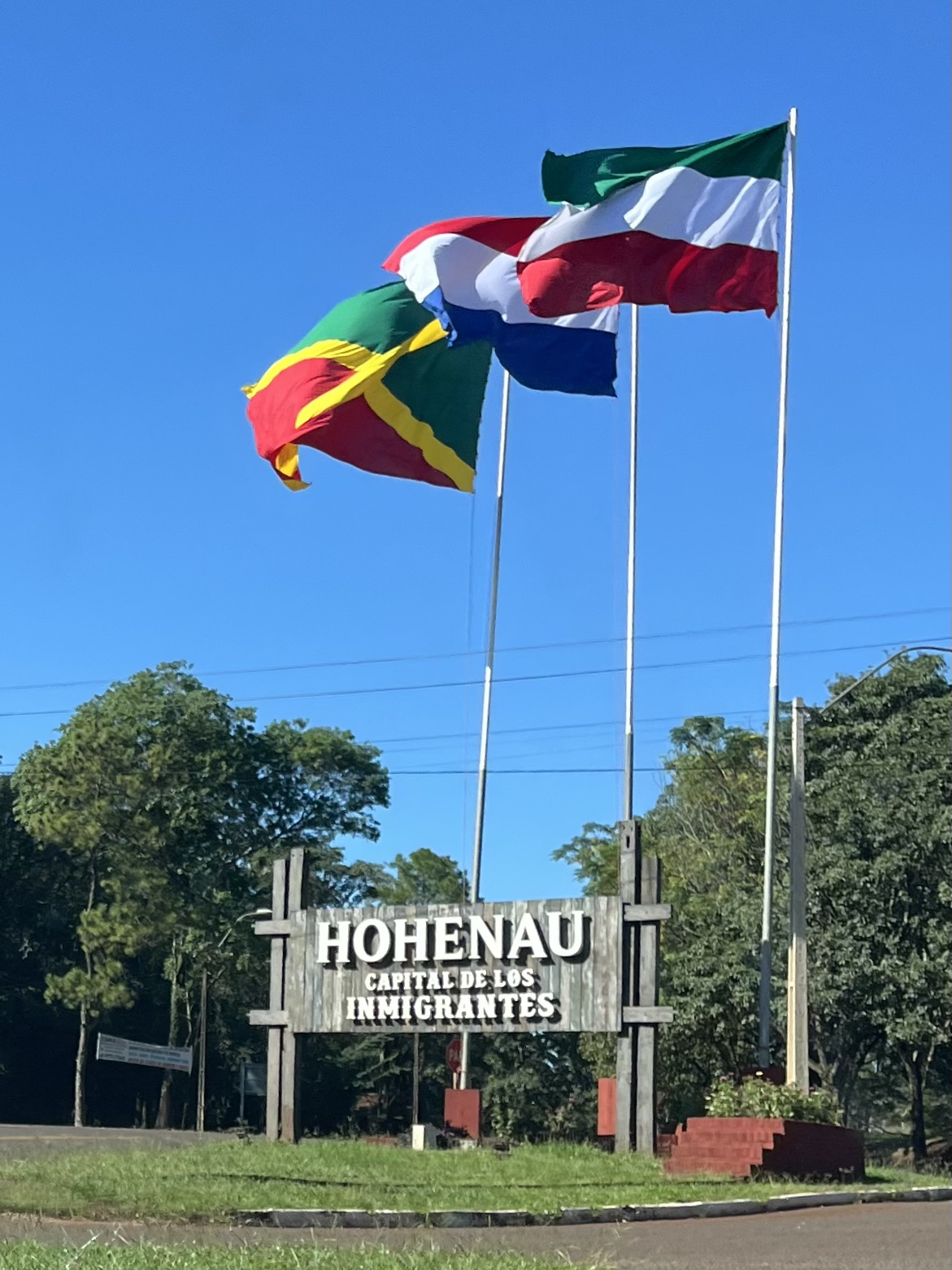
A welcome sign in Hohenau with the city flag, the flag of Paraguay, and the flag of North Rhine-Westphalia.

Hohenau was founded on March 14, 1900 by a group of German Brazilians including Wilhelm "Guillermo" Closs who was born in Dois Irmãos (then Baumschneis) on 31 October 1841 and established "Serra Pelada" in Río Grande do Sul before moving to Paraguay. There he met Carlos Reverchon, Hohenau's future co-founder, and together drafted plans for a massive wave of German immigrants to settle in the region. Additional co-founders are Ambrosio and Esteban Scholler.

Aided by the Austrian consul to Paraguay, the group persuaded the Paraguayan government to allow for the construction of a colony. In a decree dated September 12, 1898, Paraguay gave Closs and Reverchon a share of 16 square leagues in the then Alto Paraná, Encarnación Department.

On March 14, 1900, the first settlers arrived from Encarnación, and the arrival of 8 more families (a total of 55 people) in August of that year set the stage for mass migration to the colony. These early families include the Dresslers, Kuschels, Fritzes, and Jachows.

Settlers initially faced many problems, such as disease, scarcity of resources, and a lack of communication. In 1944, Hohenau's status was elevated to an official district.

German migration to Hohenau increased following World War I. In the 1930s and 1940s, the colony began to attract Polish, Ukrainian, and Russian settlers, and to a lesser degree Belgian and French. Later, in 1958, a large wave of Japanese Paraguayans arrived and went on to found the district of La Paz.

== Geography ==
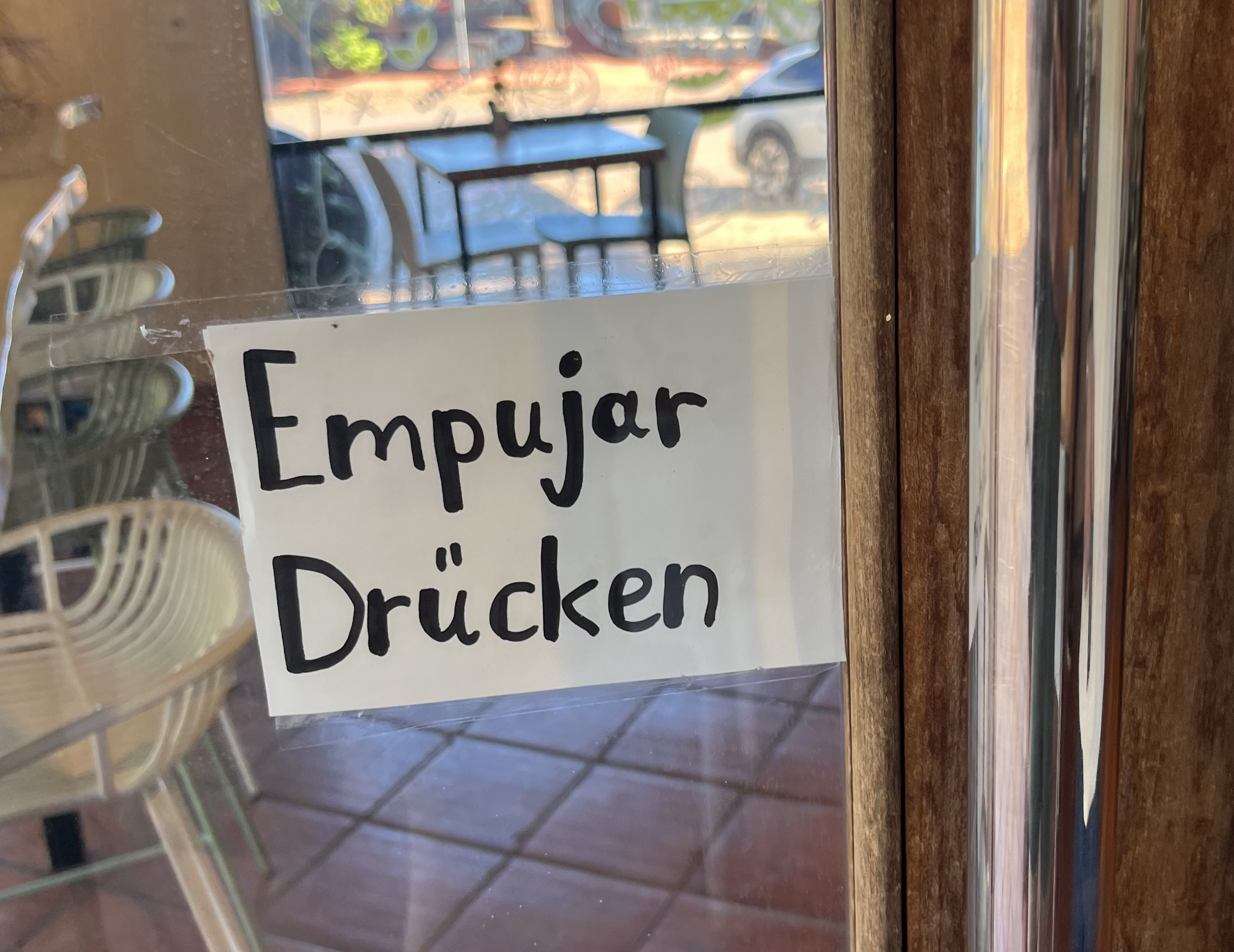
A bilingual German and Spanish sign on the door of a store in Hohenau instructs visitors to push.

The city is 220 square kilometers in area. It is bordered on the north and the east by the Obligado district, on the south by the Trinidad district, and on the west by the Jesús, La Paz, and San Pedro del Paraná districts.

The area is rich in water resources, including the Paraná River and Capi'ivary stream.

=== Climate ===
The climate is sub-tropical, ideal for agriculture, with temperatures ranging from 3-4 °C in winter to 37-38 °C in summer.

=== Demography ===
Hohenau has a total population of 7,987 inhabitants.

== Economy ==
The inhabitants are mainly focused on agriculture, specifically on the cultivation of soy, cotton, corn, manioc, yerba mate, tung, sorgo, bean, peanut, and watermelon, and the stock breeding of cows, pigs and poultry. There are also flour mills, yerba mate mills, wineries, brick factories, bakeries, saw-mills, carpentry shops, and starch factories.

According to the General Directorate of Statistics, Polls, and Census, the Hohenau district has the second-highest living standard in Paraguay, behind the capital, Asunción.

=== Tourism ===
A tourist attraction is the Alto Paraná Hunting and Fishing Club, where traditional dorado fishing takes place.

Hohenau can be reached by the Ruta Sexta Doctor Juan León Mallorquín, a road that crosses the urban center of the city and connects it with the cities of Encarnación and Ciudad del Este. A network of local roads connects Hohenau with other places in the surrounding area.

== Neighborhoods and institutions ==
Neighborhoods in the center include San José, San Blás, Cerro Corá, CONAVI, Primavera, Obrero, and Santa Lucía. Rural neighborhoods include Hohenau 1 (Puerto Hohenau), Hohenau 2 (Centro Urbano), Hohenau 3 (Campo Ángel), Hohenau 4 (Caguarené), and Hohenau 5 (Santa María).

Hohenau has a dance school, culinary arts academy, tailoring academy, barber academy, and other institutions that teach computer science and typewriting.

Medical institutions in the city include SOS Aldea de Niños, founded August 21, 1971 on land donated by the German Association of Hohenau with 17 buildings housing 160 children; the Mother and Child Hospital; the SOS Hospital with 40 beds and 2500 monthly consultations; and the Adventist Clinic that started its medical assistance service to the district and the department in 1963.

== Notable residents ==
- Nazi war criminal Josef Mengele lived in hiding in Hohenau between 1959 and 1960.
- Dutch author and far-right political figure Sid Lukkassen [nl] moved to Hohenau in 2026.
