= Luftkurort =

Title given to towns or cities in Germany which are considered beneficial to health

Luftkurort (German pronunciation: [ˈlʊftˌkuːɐ̯ʔɔʁt]), literally meaning 'air spa', is a title given to towns or cities in Austria, Switzerland, and Germany which are health resorts which have a climate and air quality which is considered beneficial to health and recovery. Tests are repeated on a regular basis to ensure that standards of air quality are maintained. A municipality with this classification can charge a health resort tax for all guests who spend the night there.

== See also ==
- Nature therapy
- Sanatorium (resort)
- Hill station
