= Wilhelmsfehn I =

- District of Wiesmoor
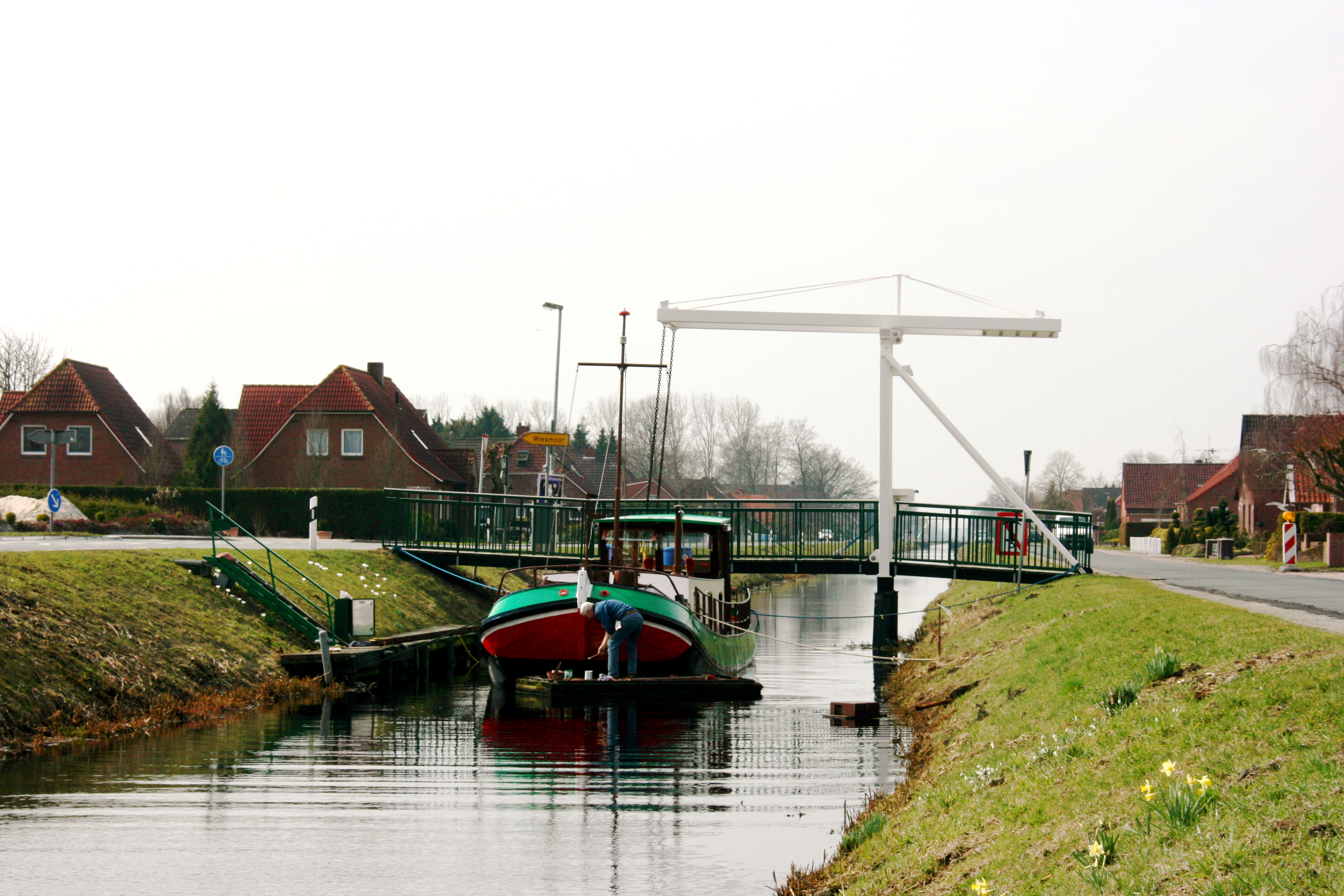
- Wilhelmsfehn Canal
- Interactive map of Wilhelmsfehn I
- Location within Germany Location within Lower Saxony
- Coordinates: 53.42226°N 7.69150°E
- Country: Germany
- State: Lower Saxony
- District: Aurich
- City: Wiesmoor
- Time zone: UTC+01:00 (CET)
  - Summer (DST): UTC+02:00 (CEST)
- Postal codes: 26639
- Dialling codes: 04944
- Vehicle registration: AUR

Wilhelmsfehn I is a district (Stadtteil) of the East Frisian town of Wiesmoor, in Lower Saxony. A linear settlement, it is located northwest of the town, to the north of Wilhelmsfehn II.

== History ==
The moor colony was founded in 1888 as an eastern extension of Ostgroßefehn and is still closely linked to it in terms of urban development today: the transition is fluid. The village was created by the Großefehngesellschaft and was named after Emperor Wilhelm I. By 1921 the town had grown to 245 inhabitants.

Wilhelmsfehn I was initially an estate district (Gutsbezirk), which became the municipality of Wilhelmsfehn in the 1920s. When the municipality of Wiesmoor was formed in 1951, the municipality of Wilhelmsfehn was incorporated into it.
