= Bella Vista, Itapúa =

Bella Vista
- district
- Location within Paraguay
- Coordinates: 27°02′00″S 55°35′00″W
- Country: Paraguay
- Department: Itapúa Department
- Established: 1918

Area
  - Total: 299.9 km^{2} (115.8 sq mi)
- Elevation: 190 m (620 ft)

Population (2022)
  - Total: 10,447
  - Density: 34.84/km^{2} (90.2/sq mi)

Bella Vista is a district and city in the Itapúa Department of Paraguay. It is located in the southern part of the country, about 400 kilometers southeast of the national capital, Asunción and 50 kilometers northeast of the department capital, Encarnación. The district spans 299.9 square kilometers with its population reaching 10,447 residents as of the 2022 Paraguayan census. Recognized as the national capital of yerba mate, the district draws over 60,000 tourists annually and was included in the World Tourism Organization's list of best tourist towns in the world.

== Geography and location ==
Bella Vista is located in the southern part of Paraguay, in the Itapúa Department, about 400 kilometers southeast of the national capital, Asunción and 50 kilometers northeast of the department capital, Encarnación.

== Demographics ==
According to data from the General Directorate of Statistics of Paraguay, the population of Bella Vista grew from 9,193 inhabitants recorded in the 2002 Paraguayan census to 10,447 inhabitants recorded in the 2022 Paraguayan census, representing an annual growth rate of 0.64% over the two decade period. Across the district's total area of 299.9 square kilometers, this population size yields a population density of 34.84 people per square kilometer.

The 2022 census data revealed a balanced gender distribution, consisting of 5,324 (51%) males and 5,123 (49%) females. In terms of age distribution, the district skews toward the young and middle-aged demographics. The largest segment of the population falls within the 15-64 age bracket, accounting for 6,959 individuals (66.6%). Children and adolescents aged 14 and under represent nearly a quarter of the population at 2,557 individuals (24.5%), while the elderly population aged 65 and older forms the smallest part with 931 residents (8.9%).

Regarding the distribution of the population between rural areas and urban settings, Bella Vista is slightly more urbanized, though it maintains a strong rural presence. A slim majority of the population, totaling 5,508 residents (52.7%), resides in urban areas, while 4,939 people (47.3%) inhabit the district's rural parts.

== Economy ==
The economy of Bella Vista is driven by agriculture, particularly the cultivation of yerba mate, with the district being declared the "national capital of yerba mate". In addition to yerba mate, farmers in Bella Vista widely cultivate crops such as soybeans, wheat, and corn, utilizing the region's fertile soil.

Tourism has also emerged as a significant economic driver, drawing over 60,000 visitors annually and generating approximately $US 3 million in revenue through cultural festivals and specialized agritourism circuits centered around the yerba mate industry. This successful integration of rural heritage and sustainable tourism earned the district recognition from the World Tourism Organization, who included it in their list of best tourist towns in the world.
