= Nordgeorgsfehn Canal =

Canal in Germany

Coordinates: 53°13′N 7°38′E

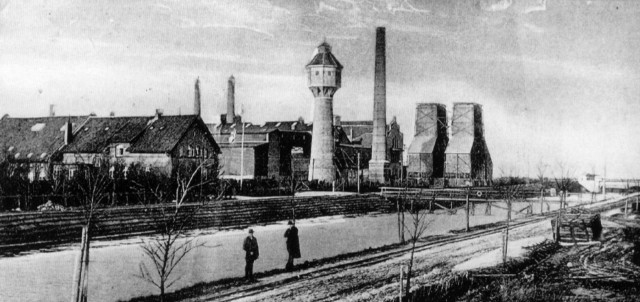

The Nordgeorgsfehn Canal (German: Nordgeorgsfehnkanal or NGFK) is a canal in East Frisia, Lower Saxony, Germany. It connects the Jümme with the Ems-Jade Canal. It is 31.8 km long and 13 m wide. The maximum permitted draught of boats on the canal is 1.4 m and the maximum permitted height is 2.2 m. The canal has eight locks and twenty five bridges of which ten are swing bridges.

The canal is owned by the state of Lower Saxony and is operated by NLWKN.
