= Juan de Ayolas Airport =

Juan de Ayolas Airport Aeropuerto Juan de Ayolas
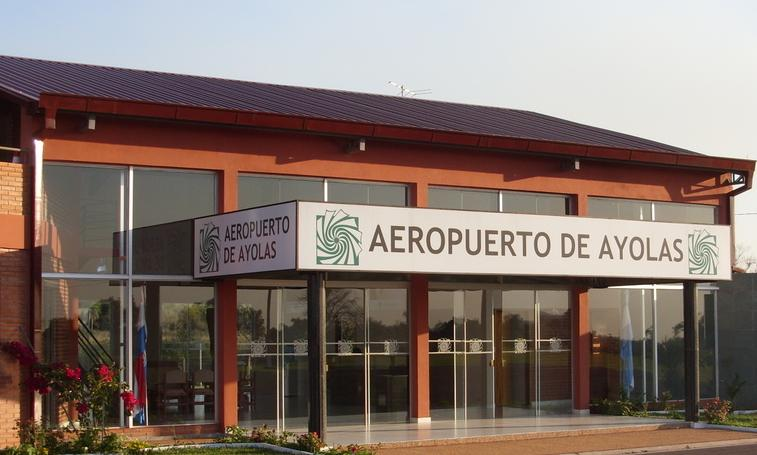
- IATA: AYO; ICAO: SGAY

Summary
- Airport type: Public
- Serves: Ayolas, Paraguay
- Elevation AMSL: 223 ft / 68 m
- Coordinates: 27°22′14″S 056°51′14″W
- Interactive map of Juan de Ayolas Airport

Runways
Direction	Length		Surface
Direction	m	ft	Surface
02/20	1,850	6,070	Asphalt
- Source: DAFIF

Juan de Ayolas Airport (IATA: AYO, ICAO: SGAY) is an airport that serves the city of Ayolas, in the Misiones Department of Paraguay. The airport is named after Juan de Ayolas. It is operated by both Argentine and Paraguayan authorities.
It's located 20 km from the Yacyretá Dam.

== Accidents and incidents ==
- On 26 July 2018, a Minister of Agriculture and Livestock of Paraguay Beechcraft Baron carrying Luis Gneiting, the vice minister and the two pilots crashed shortly after takeoff near the airport.

== See also ==
- List of airports in Paraguay
- Transport in Paraguay
