= Luis Gneiting =

Paraguayan politician (1968–2018)

Minister of Agriculture and Livestock of Paraguay
- In office May 24, 2018 – July 25, 2018
- President: Horacio Cartes
- Preceded by: Marcos Medina
- Succeeded by: TBD

Governor of Itapúa Department
- In office August 15, 2013 – August 15, 2017
- Preceded by: David Benjamín Franz Kugler
- Succeeded by: Federico Vergara

Member of the Chamber of Deputies of Paraguay
- In office August 15, 2008 – August 15, 2013

Mayor of Carmen del Paraná
- In office 1997–1999

Personal details
- Born: Luis Roberto Gneiting Dichtiar; February 22, 1968 Carmen del Paraná, Paraguay
- Died: July 25, 2018 (aged 50) Ayolas, Paraguay
- Party: Colorado Party
- Spouse(s): Delia Edith Floris Cardozo (div. 2012) Liliana Beatriz Benítez (?–2018; his death)
- Children: Guillermo Gneiting Floris; Viviane Gneiting Floris; Alejandro Vera y Aragón Benítez
- Education: Universidad Nacional de Asunción
- Occupation: Veterinarian

Luis Roberto Gneiting Dichtiar (22 February 1968 – 25 July 2018) was a Paraguayan politician.

His parents were Miguel Gneiting and Irene Dichtiar. Prior to his political career, Luis Gneiting was a veterinarian. The younger Gneiting succeeded his father as mayor of Carmen del Paraná in 1997 and served until 1999. In 2008, Luis Gneiting was elected to the Chamber of Deputies. He left the legislature to assume the governorship of Itapúa Department. Gneiting stepped down in 2017, and was appointed Minister of Agriculture and Livestock in May 2018. He died in a plane crash on 25 July 2018, aged 50. Gneiting and deputy agriculture minister Vicente Ramírez were traveling from Ayolas to Asunción.

Gneiting was survived by his second wife Liliana Beatriz Benítez, and children from his first marriage to Delia Edith Floris Cardozo, whom he divorced in April 2012.
