= Néstor Camacho =

Paraguayan footballer (born 1987)

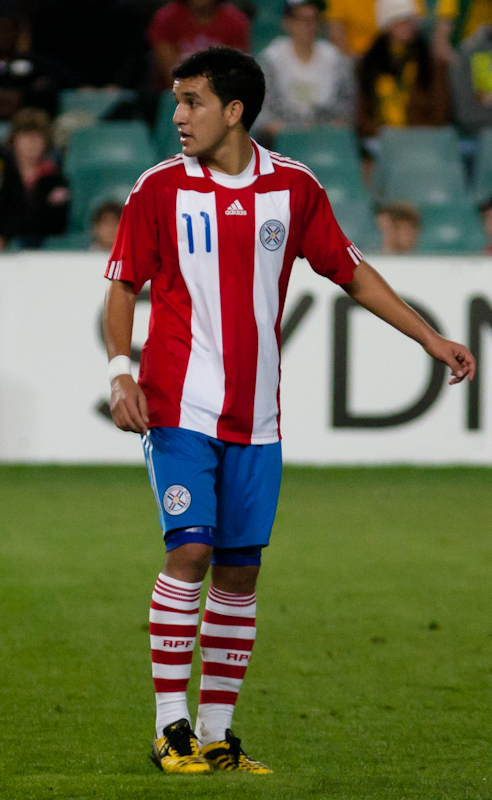
- Camacho with Paraguay in 2010

Personal information
- Full name: Néstor Abrahan Camacho Ledesma
- Date of birth: 15 October 1987 (age 39)
- Place of birth: Villa Florida, Paraguay
- Height: 1.75 m (5 ft 9 in)
- Positions: Attacking midfielder; winger

Team information
- Current team: Sportivo Trinidense
- Number: 7

Youth career
- 2005–2007: Libertad

Senior career*
Years	Team	Apps	(Gls)
2007–2013	Libertad	61	(5)
2009–2011	→ Rubio Ñu (loan)	50	(13)
2011–2013	→ Newell's Old Boys (loan)	18	(0)
2013–2014	Deportivo Cali	34	(6)
2014–2015	Libertad	38	(10)
2015–2016	Avaí	12	(1)
2016–2017	Guaraní	41	(18)
2017–2022	Olimpia	152	(56)
2022–2023	Guaraní	48	(13)
2024	Tacuary	31	(4)
2025–	Sportivo Trinidense	23	(9)

International career
2010–2018	Paraguay	8	(1)
- * Club domestic league appearances and goals as of 13 August 2025

Néstor Abrahan Camacho Ledesma (born 15 October 1987) is a Paraguayan professional footballer who plays for Sportivo Trinidense. Mainly an attacking midfielder or winger, he can also appear as a central midfielder.

== Club career ==
Born in Villa Florida, Misiones, Camacho was a Libertad youth graduate. He made his first team debut during the 2007 season, appearing in five matches.

In 2009 Camacho was loaned to fellow Primera División side Rubio Ñú, for one year. He scored his first senior goal on 22 November, netting the first in a 2–0 home win against 2 de Mayo.

Camacho scored 11 goals for Rubio Ñú during the 2010 campaign, with his side achieving an impressive fifth position. On 16 February 2011 he moved abroad, signing for Argentine Primera División side Newell's Old Boys.

After being sparingly used, Camacho switched teams and countries again, joining Colombia's Deportivo Cali on 12 August 2013. The following year, he returned to his first club Libertad.

On 31 July 2015 Camacho moved to Campeonato Brasileiro Série A side Avaí. He contributed with 12 appearances and one goal, suffering team relegation.

On 20 January 2016 Camacho moved back to Paraguay and joined Guaraní. He finished the year with a career-best 18 league goals, as his side was crowned champions.

== International career ==
On 24 August 2010 Camacho was called up to Paraguay national team by manager Gerardo Martino for friendlies against Japan and China. He made his full international debut on 4 September, starting in a 0–1 loss against the former in Yokohama.

Camacho scored his first international goal on 6 September 2011, netting the first in a 3–0 win at Honduras through a penalty.

== Career statistics ==
=== Club ===
As of 18 December 2016

Club	Season	League			Cup		Continental		Other		Total	
Club	Season	Division	Apps	Goals	Apps	Goals	Apps	Goals	Apps	Goals	Apps	Goals
Libertad	2007	Primera División	5	0	—		—		—		5	0
Libertad	2008	Primera División	1	0	—		—		—		1	0
Libertad	2009	Primera División	5	0	—		1 (Note: All appearance(s) in Copa Libertadores)	0	—		6	0
Libertad	2012	Primera División	37	5	—		4	1	—		41	6
Libertad	2013	Primera División	13	0	—		—		—		13	0
Libertad	Subtotal		61	5	—		5	1	—		66	6
Rubio Ñú	2009	Primera División	14	2	—		—		—		14	2
Rubio Ñú	2010	Primera División	35	11	—		—		—		35	11
Rubio Ñú	2011	Primera División	1	0	—		—		—		1	0
Rubio Ñú	Subtotal		50	13	—		—		—		50	13
Newell's Old Boys	2010–11	Primera División	12	0	—		—		—		12	0
Newell's Old Boys	2011–12	Primera División	6	0	—		—		—		6	0
Newell's Old Boys	Subtotal		18	0	—		—		—		18	0
Deportivo Cali	2013	Primera A	21	5	1	1	—		—		22	6
Deportivo Cali	2014	Primera A	13	1	—		3	1	2 (Note: All appearance(s) in Superliga Colombiana)	0	18	2
Deportivo Cali	Subtotal		34	6	1	1	3	1	2	0	40	8
Libertad	2014	Primera División	20	7	—		4 (Note: All appearance(s) in Copa Sudamericana)	0	—		24	7
Libertad	2015	Primera División	18	3	—		4	0	—		22	3
Libertad	Subtotal		38	10	—		8	0	—		46	10
Avaí	2015	Série A	12	1	—		—		—		12	1
Guaraní	2016	Primera División	41	18	—		2	0	—		43	18
Career total			254	53	1	1	18	2	2	0	275	56

=== International ===
As of 1 July 2017

Paraguay
Year	Apps	Goals
2010	5	0
2011	2	1
2017	1	0
Total	8	1

==== International goals ====
Scores and results list Paraguay's goal tally first.

No	Date	Venue	Opponent	Score	Result	Competition
1.	6 September 2010	Olímpico Metropolitano, San Pedro Sula, Honduras	Honduras	1–0	3–0	Friendly

== Honours ==
Deportivo Cali

- Superliga Colombiana: 2014

Libertad

- Paraguayan Primera División: 2014-I, 2014-II

Guaraní

- Paraguayan Primera División: 2016
