= Oscar Rivas (environmentalist) =

Paraguayan environmentalist

- Known for: Grassroots environmental activism
- Awards: Goldman Environmental Prize (2000)

Oscar Rivas is a Paraguayan environmentalist. He was awarded the Goldman Environmental Prize in 2000, jointly with Elias Diaz Peña, for their efforts to protect the ecosystems of the Paraná River and the Paraguay River, in particular consequences from the Yacyretá Dam project.
