= San Cosme y Damián =

- district
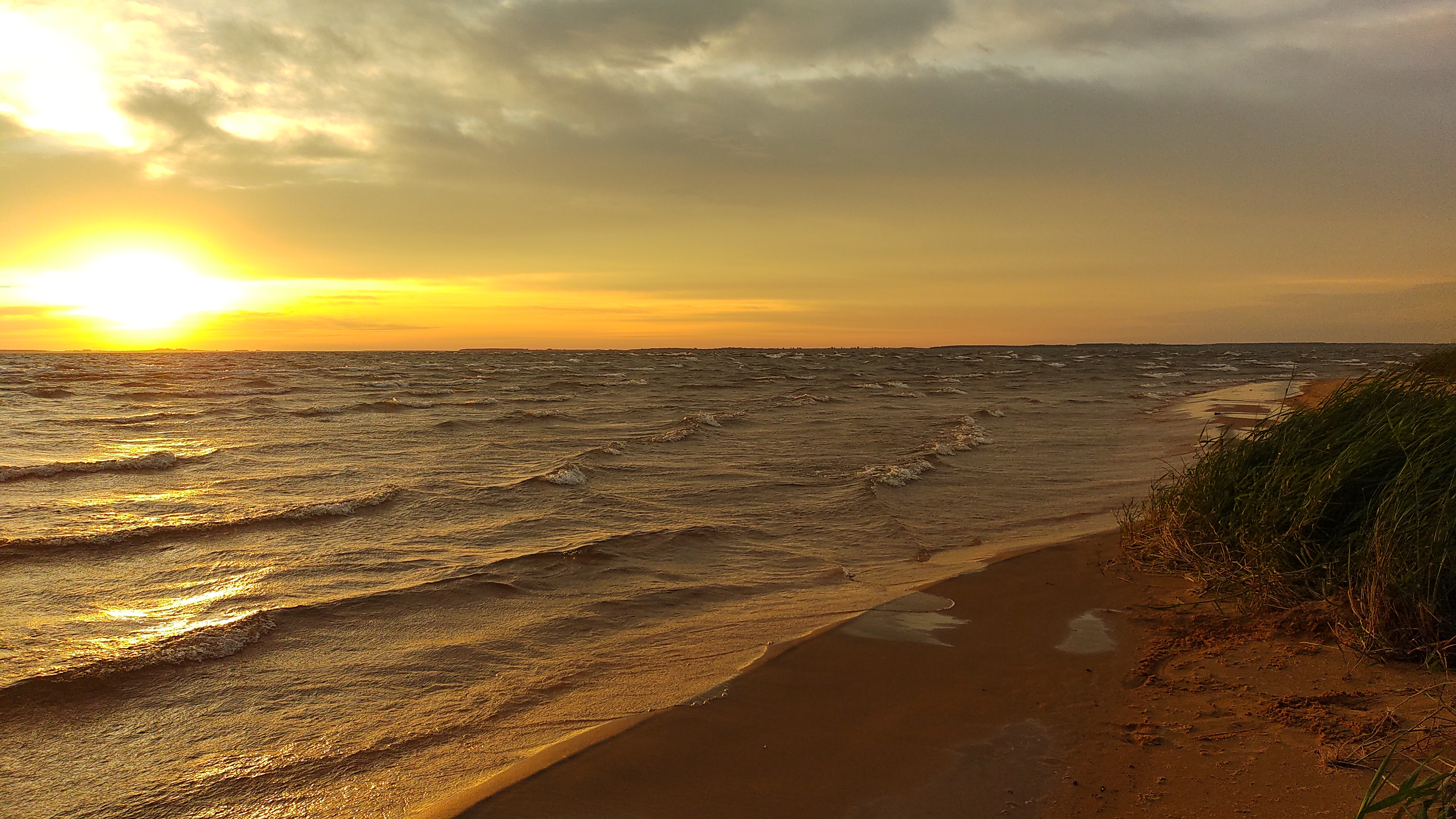
- San Cosme y Damián, Paraguay

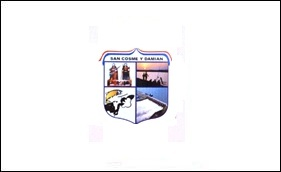
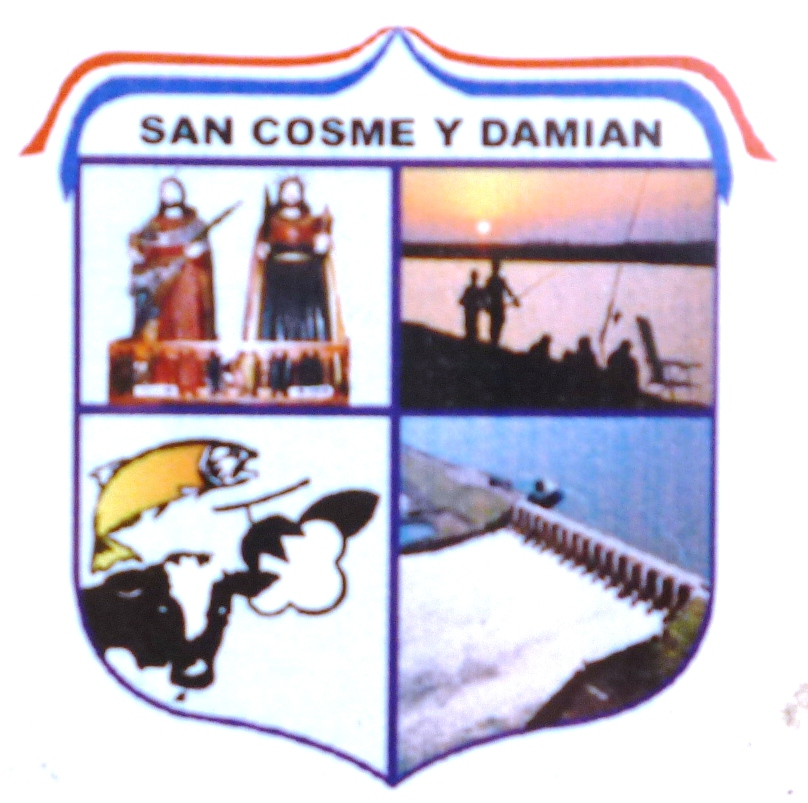
- Flag Seal

- Location within Paraguay
- Coordinates: 27°19′12″S 56°21′0″W
- Country: Paraguay
- Department: Itapúa Department
- Founded: 1632

Government
  - Intendente: Juan Manuel Santacruz

Area
  - Total: 800 km^{2} (310 sq mi)

Population (2015)
  - Total: 9,500
- Area code: 073

San Cosme y Damián is a district in the Itapúa Department of Paraguay. Located 80 km west of Encarnación, it is close to places like Ayolas, General Artigas or Isla Apipé, in Southern Paraguay and Northern Argentina, along the Paraná River, at the Argentina–Paraguay border. It covers an area of 800 km^{2} and has an estimated population of over 10,000 in 2023.

== History ==
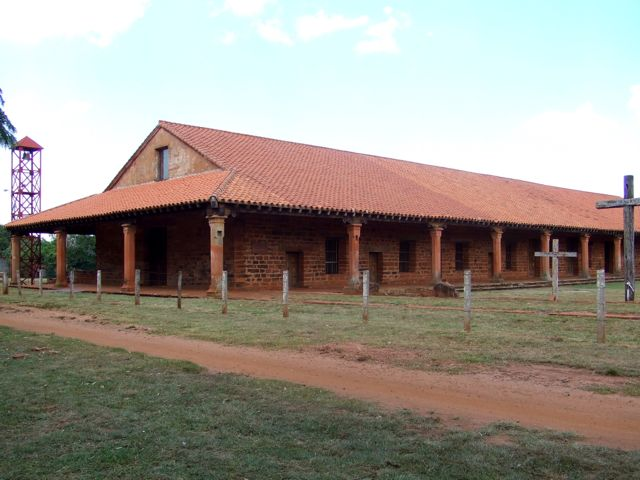
Mission San Cosme y Damian church

The name was given by Jesuits after Saints Cosmas and Damian, twin brothers from third-century who practiced medicine.

The Jesuit ruins found in San Cosme y Damián are the remains of some 30 missions, also known as reductions (Spanish: reducciones), found in the Río de la Plata region. The San Cosme y Damián mission was one of seven missions located in Paraguay; the other missions are found in modern day Argentina and Brazil. The Jesuit mission of San Cosme y Damián was founded in 1632 by Father Adriano Formoso. The settlers had to move several times before ultimately establishing themselves upon the north bank of the Paraná River in 1718.

The ruins of the San Cosme y San Damián mission holds several well-preserved artifacts and archaeological finds. These ruins are the only ones in Paraguay to still have a functional church, which has been continually used to this day as a place of worship and as a community centre. The church also has original wood carvings, a number of them even with their original colouring. Some of these carvings depict Jesus with indigenous features. The school and priests' rooms are also well-preserved. One can still observe the original painted ceiling and stone ornaments made by the inhabitants. As of April 2022, there remains a side of the mission that has not been excavated.

During the 18th century, Mission San Cosme y San Damián was also the site of an observatory, due to the work of Father Buenaventura Suárez. Born in Santa Fe, Argentina in 1678, Father Suárez came to San Cosme y Damián in 1703. He stayed and worked there till his death in 1750. With the help of the Guaraní people, he built several astronomical devices such as sundials, telescopes, quadrants, etc. Although rudimentary in nature, these devices were completely functional and accurate and allowed Father Suárez to make many observations. He sent his observations of eclipses, satellites of Jupiter, and the rings of Saturn to European scientists who were intrigued by astronomical data from the Southern Hemisphere. Some of his findings were even published in European journals. Father Suárez's work culminated in the publication of his book Lunario de un Siglo (English: Lunar Centenar) in 1743. This was an astronomical calendar of a century, 1740-1840. This book predicted with great accuracy the eclipses that would occur in this time period and also contained geographical data of 70 cities. Nearly all of his instruments have been lost, with only the sundial still remaining in the schoolyard.

Other priests who played an important role in the development of San Cosme y Damián include Fathers Adolfo Scal, Johan Gilde, Unger and Taddaeus Enis. Father Enis was especially famous for leading the native population in battles against the Portuguese.

== Geography ==
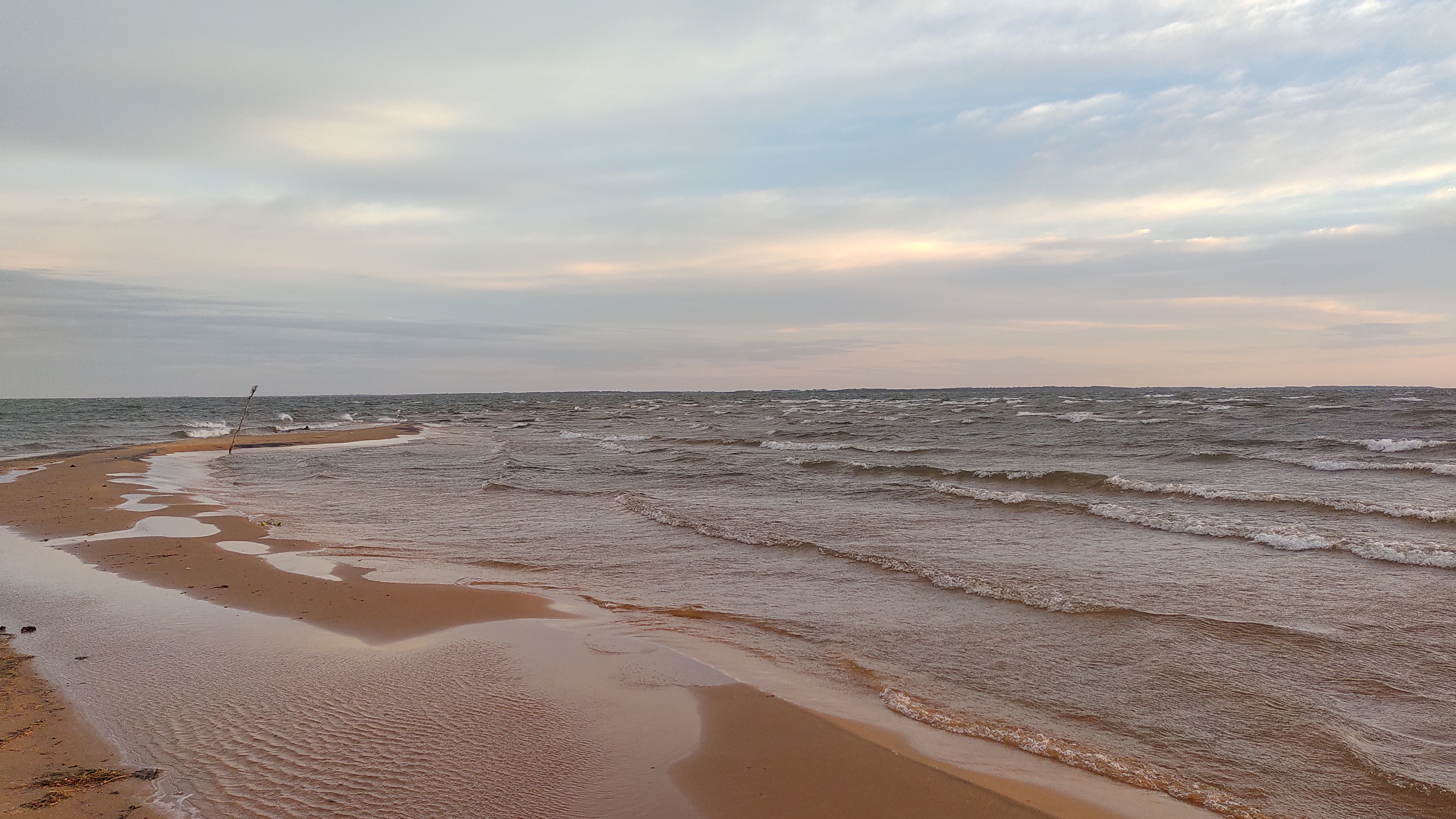
Sand dunes of San Cosme y Damián, from the island of Ybycuí

To the north of San Cosme y Damián is the district of Coronel Bogado. To the west is Misiones Department and the district of General Delgado. The Paraná river runs through the southern border and separates the district from Argentina. Major towns in this district include Tiburcio Bogado, Lomas Valentinas, San Lorenzo (Colonia Voluntad), Cambyretá, Tiburcio Bogado, Pirity, Potrero Yvate, San Mauricio and Atinguy.

The island Ybycuí is found in the Paraná river, near the district. The island is well known for containing sand dunes, which are the remains of Yacyretá Island.

== Economy ==
The principal economic activities are farming, livestock and fishing. The agricultural output largely includes cotton, maize, cassava, rice, bean, soybean and sugarcane and most of the livestock is bovine, chicken and pig. Like many rural communities, the district suffers from brain drain as many of the youth will leave to study or work in nearby Argentina or more urban areas of Paraguay like Asunción, Encarnación and Ciudad del Este.

Tourism also contributes to the economy. In 2015, over 16,000 people went to visit the Jesuit missions among the Guaraní in San Cosme y Damián and over 17,000 were recorded in 2016.
