= Carmen del Paraná =

Carmen del Paraná Karmen Parana-pegua
- district
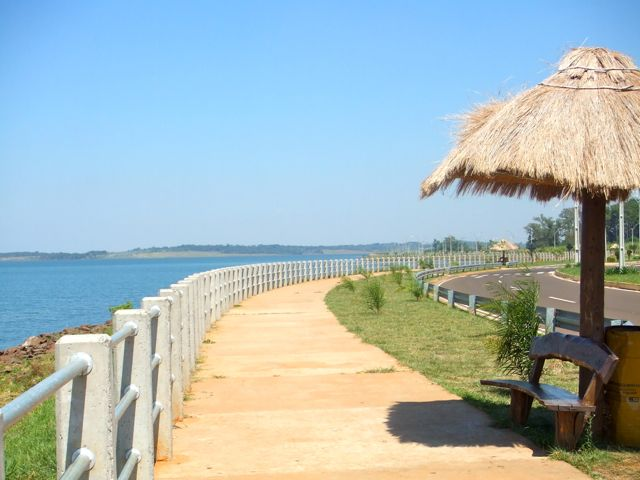

- Location within Paraguay
- Coordinates: 27°13′48″S 56°13′12″W
- Country: Paraguay
- Department: Itapúa Department

Population (2022)
  - Total: 6,417

Carmen del Paraná (Guarani: Karmen Parana-pegua) is a district in the Itapúa Department of Paraguay. It is located in the southern part of the country, about 350 kilometers south of the national capital, Asunción and 35 kilometers northwest of the department capital, Encarnación. Founded in 1843 by Carlos Antonio López and Mariano Roque Alonso, the district is historically revered as the "Cradle of Independence of Paraguay" due to the pivotal Battle of Tacuarí in 1811.

Covering an area of 302.5 square kilometers, Carmen del Paraná has a predominantly urban and working age population of 6,417 inhabitants per the 2022 Paraguayan census. Economically, the district is a major agricultural hub famously known as the "Capital of Rice," hosting three of Paraguay's largest rice processing mills. In recent years, infrastructure developments following the construction of the Yacyretá Dam have transformed the district into a popular summer destination, drawing thousands of tourists to its 10-kilometer waterfront and beaches.

== Geography and location ==
Carmen del Paraná is located in the southern part of Paraguay, in the Itapúa Department, about 350 kilometers south of the national capital, Asunción and 35 kilometers northwest of the department capital, Encarnación.

== History ==
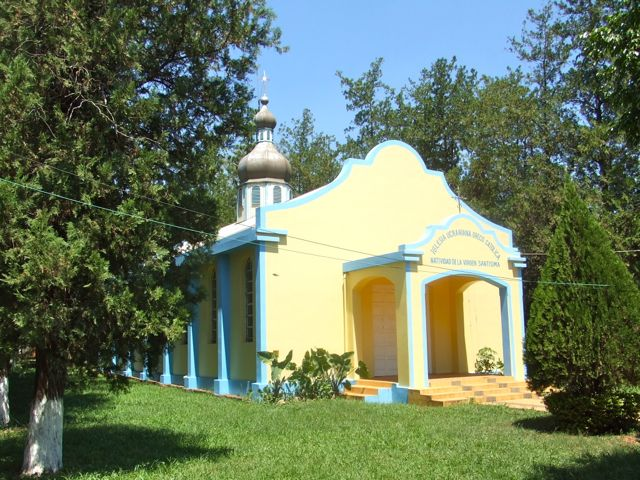
Ukrainian Church in Carmen de Parana

Carmen del Paraná was founded on 24 April 1843 by decree of Carlos Antonio López and Mariano Roque Alonso. The district is known as the "Cradle of Independence of Paraguay" due to the Battle of Tacuarí that took place on 9 March 1811, which was a definitive step towards achieving the country's independence in May 1811.

== Demographics ==
According to data from the General Directorate of Statistics of Paraguay, the population of Carmen del Paraná grew from 6,165 inhabitants recorded in the 2002 Paraguayan census to 6,417 inhabitants recorded in the 2022 Paraguayan census, representing an annual growth rate of 0.20% over the two decade period. Across the district's total area of 302.5 square kilometers, this population size yields a population density of 21.21 people per square kilometer. The 2022 census data revealed a highly balanced gender distribution, consisting of 3,210 males and 3,207 females, each comprising approximately 50% of the population. Structurally, the population is predominantly urban and working age. Approximately 70.1% (4,499 people) reside in urban centers compared to 29.9% (1,918 people) in rural areas, while 64.5% (4,136 people) fall into the 15-64 age bracket, with children aged 0-14 making up 24.4% (1,566 people) and elderly residents aged 65 and older accounting for the remaining 11.1% (715 people).

== Economy ==
The inhabitants of Carmen del Paraná mainly work in the agriculture, with extensive plantations of rice, soybeans, and wheat, and in livestock on cattle ranches. The district is considered the "Capital of Rice" due to three of the largest rice processing mills in the country are located there, with the district being a major rice producer since 1940.

Following infrastructure developments by the Yacyretá Binational Entity to compensate for lost territory due to the construction of the Yacyretá Dam, the district emerged as a popular summer destination by 2013. Its 10-kilometer waterfront and three beaches attracted up to 15,000 weekend tourists, creating a shift toward a seasonal coastal lifestyle despite a local deficit in hotels and restaurants.
