= Agustín Pío Barrios =

Paraguayan guitarist and composer (1885–1944)

Agustín Pío Barrios Agustín Pío Barrios
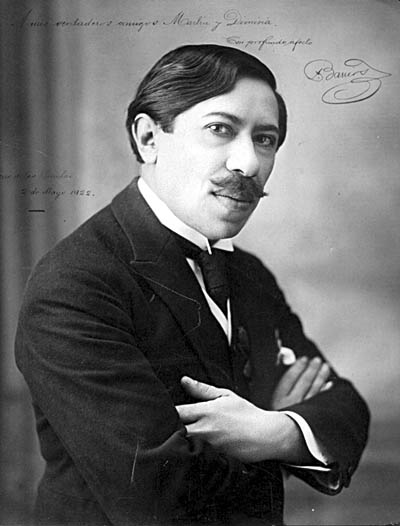

Background information
- Born: Agustín Pío Barrios Ferreira; May 5, 1885; San Juan Bautista, Paraguay
- Died: August 7, 1944 (aged 59) San Salvador, El Salvador
- Occupations: Guitarist, composer
- Instruments: Classical guitar

Agustín Pío Barrios (also known as Agustín Barrios Mangoré and Nitsuga—Agustín spelled backwards—Mangoré; May 5, 1885 – August 7, 1944) was a Paraguayan virtuoso classical guitarist and composer, regarded by some as one of the greatest performers and arguably the most prolific composer for the classical guitar.

== Biography ==
=== Birthplace ===
It has been generally accepted that Barrios was born in San Juan Bautista, Paraguay, although the baptismal document in the book of registries in the cathedral of that city does not give his place of birth and several biographers and authorities present evidence that he was actually born in nearby Villa Florida, Misiones, on the Tebicuary River, 30 km to the north; Barrios' diplomatic papers, found in 2019, give "Missiones" [sic] as the place of birth.

=== Early life ===
As a child, Barrios developed a love of music and literature, two arts that were very important to his family. Barrios would eventually speak two languages (Spanish and Guarani), and read three others (English, French, and German).

Barrios began to show an interest in musical instruments, particularly the guitar, before he reached his teens. He went to Asunción in 1900, at the age of fifteen, to attend Colegio Nacional de Asunción, thus becoming one of the youngest university students in Paraguayan history. Apart from his studies in the music department, Barrios was highly appreciated by members of the mathematics, journalism and literature departments. He was a skilled graphic artist and worked for a time in the Agricultura bank and the Paraguayan Naval office.

After leaving the Colegio Nacional, Barrios dedicated his life to music, poetry, and travel. He composed more than 100 original works and arranged another 200 works of other composers. Barrios made several friends during his many trips across South America. He was known for giving his friends and fans signed copies of his poems. As a consequence, there are several versions of his poetical works that have surfaced across the Americas. Many current collectors warn potential buyers to be careful when they come across a work reportedly autographed by Barrios because of known forgeries.

=== Career ===
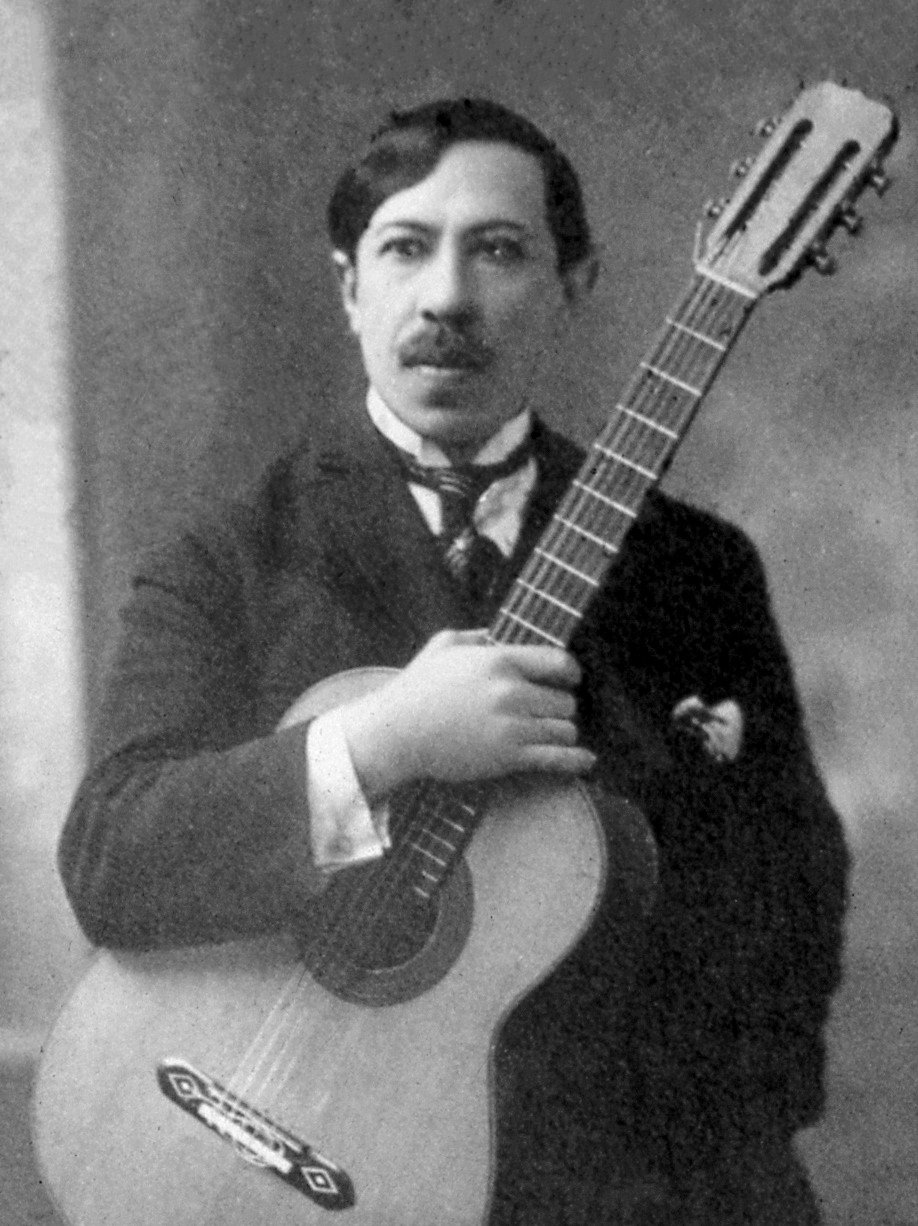
Barrios in 1922

Barrios was famed for his phenomenal performances, both live and on gramophone recordings. Eye-witness testimony from Lope Texera in Caracas Venezuela on April 18, 1932, declared that Barrios was "superior to Segovia whom I saw in London last year". Barrios has been credited as the first classical guitarist to make recordings, in 1909/10, but the earliest known recordings were by guitarists Luis and Simon Ramirez, onto cylinders, for the "Viuda de Aramburo" label, in Madrid, between 1897 and 1901. Barrios sometimes performed in concert in traditional Paraguayan dress (he was partly of Guaraní origin), beginning in 1932 using the pseudonym of Nitsuga Mangoré ('Nitsuga' being Agustín spelled backwards, and 'Mangoré' being the name of a cacique of the South American indigenous group Timbú).

His works were largely late-Romantic in character, despite his having lived well into the twentieth century. Many of them are also adaptations of, or are influenced by, South American and Central American folk music. Many of them are considered virtuosic.

The Johann Sebastian Bach-inspired La Catedral, from 1921, is widely considered to be Barrios' magnum opus, winning the approval of Andrés Segovia, who said "In 1921 in Buenos Aires, I played at the hall La Argentina noted for its good acoustics for guitar, where Barrios had concertized just weeks before me. He was presented to me by his secretary Elbio Trapani. At my invitation, Barrios visited me at the hotel and played for me upon my very own guitar several of his compositions, among which the one that really impressed me was a magnificent concert piece The Cathedral whose first movement is an andante, like an introduction and prelude, and a second very virtuosic piece which is ideal for the repertory of any concert guitarist. Barrios had promised to send me immediately a copy of the work (I had ten days remaining before continuing my journey) but I never received a copy." However, it is possible that Segovia did receive the score and chose not to play it, either out of distaste for Barrios' folk-based music or professional jealousy (because Barrios was more of a composer than he was).

=== Later life and death ===
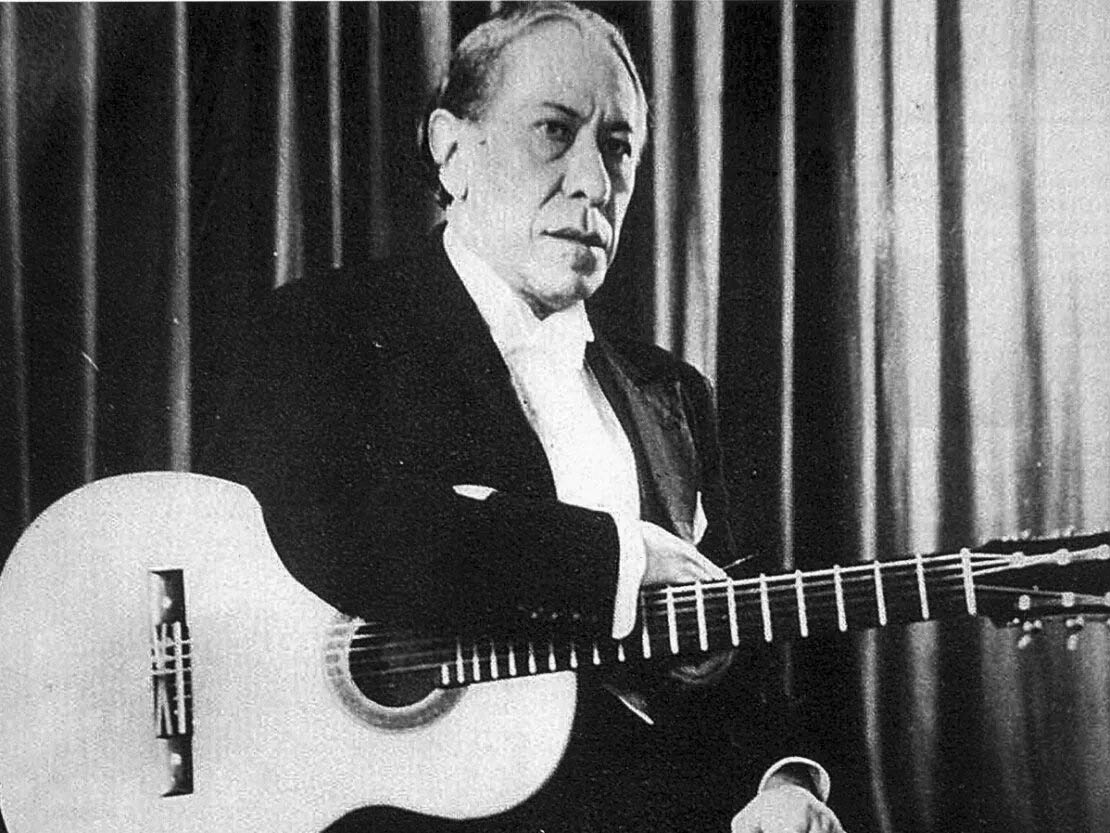
An elderly Barrios in the 1940s

After touring Europe in 1934-35, Barrios performed in Venezuela, Haiti, Cuba, Costa Rica, Nicaragua, El Salvador and Guatemala. Several writers have suggested that Barrios revisited Mexico in 1939, but his immigration file with the Mexican government did not include an entry for him or his wife Gloria that year. He fulfilled his dream to reach the United States after getting an entry visa at the US Embassy in Maracaibo Venezuela on December 23, 1936. Ship passenger lists reveal that Barrios and his wife travelled as diplomats and arrived in Puerto Rico, a US territory, in January 1937.

He reportedly suffered a myocardial infarction in front of the US Embassy in Guatemala City on October 27, 1939, after it was discovered that he was travelling with phony diplomatic papers issued by his lifetime friend and Patron Tomas Salomoni. Having recently been in Germany, at the lead-in to the Second World War, Barrios was never again able to use his diplomatic connections. He was sent an invitation to leave Guatemala because of his political leanings. He accepted a presidential invite of Maximiliano Hernández Martínez, then President of El Salvador, to move to El Salvador, and take up a position in the National Conservatory of Music and Declamation 'Rafael Olmedo'.

He was never to leave El Salvador. Past biographers suggested that, on August 7, 1944, he suffered a second myocardial infarction which caused his death, but this is still undetermined. A forensic physician has suggested that his death was more likely due to poisoning. At the time, Barrios' wife was carrying on an open affair with the Italian coffee plantation owner Pasquale Cosarelli, who was also residing in the Barrios household. Cosarelli was soon to marry Barrios' widow, and had both the motive and the chemicals to carry out the murder. Barrios was buried at Cementerio de Los Ilustres, having been carried there in the hottest week of the year on the shoulders of his students. In the hours after his death, his handwritten scores were stolen by his students along with his scrapbooks.

== Legacy ==
=== Twelve "Mangoreanos" ===
During his performing years, Barrios only informally shared bits of his musical knowledge with his patrons Luis Pasquet, Martin Borda Pagola, Dionisio Basualdo, Bautista and Lalyta Almiron, and Raul Borges.

Barrios vehemently rejected the idea of devoting time to the formal instruction of students, as he saw it detrimental to the flourishing of the artist, often responding to persuasive attempts "cuando nace el maestro, muere el artista" (the artist dies with the birth of the teacher). Given his masterful command of the instrument and compositional prolificity, the stance was then perceived as tragic eccentricity.

Following his extensive travels in Brazil while he was still an active performer, and beginning in 1940, he wrote his guitar method. Fate and necessity had it such that he, after arriving in El Salvador, were to finally provide comprehensive guitar composition and performance instruction to selected students, mostly of Salvadoran nationality. They were known as the Twelve "Mangoreanos":

1. Luis Mario Samayoa ( -1969)
2. Benjamín Cisneros ( -1987)
3. Rubén Urquilla ( -1993)
4. René Cortés-Andrino ( -1995)
5. Mario Cardona Lazo ( -1999)
6. Jesús Quiroa ( -2001)
7. Jose Cándido Morales ( -2002)
8. Julio Cortés-Andrino ( -2006)
9. Cecilio Orellana ( -2007)
10. Roberto Bracamontes ( -2007)
11. Víctor Urrutia ( -2010)
12. Elena Valdivieso (-unknown)

Jose Cándido Morales and Roberto Bracamontes were the only ones to learn from Barrios as live-in students in the Barrios home, which functioned as a boarding house.

After Barrios' death, Morales remained the keeper of Barrios' legacy, techniques, and late works. Morales taught hundreds across socio-economic segments, ages, and natural talents. Notable descendants of Barrios through Morales' formation include Dr Jorge Alberto Sanabria and Oscar Babich.

== Folk music ==
The folk music of Paraguay (including the polca paraguaya and vals) provided the young Barrios with his first introduction to music. In 1898, Barrios was formally introduced to the classical guitar repertoire by Gustavo Sosa Escalada. At that time, Barrios may have already composed works for the guitar, and also performed pieces written by his other composers, such as La Chinita and La Perezosa. Under the influence of his new teacher, Barrios went on to perform and study the works of Tárrega, Viñas, Sor and Aguado. Sosa Escalada was so impressed with his new pupil that he convinced Barrios's parents to let him move to Asunción to continue his education. Having already surpassed the technical and performing abilities of most guitarists, Barrios began seriously to compose around 1905.

Among the folkloric influences, Barrios is known to have played such popular Paraguayan works as "Campamento Cerro León", "Londón Carapé", "Guyrá campana", "Mamá Cumandá". As an example, "Guyrá campana" is very interesting, since some of the material can be heard in parts of Barrios' recording of "Caazapá — Aire Popular Paraguayo". Though "Guyrá campana" is traditional music, many maintain that it is very closely related to guitarist Carlos Talavera (from Caazapá), whom Barrios knew. There are various versions of "Guyrá campana" (it is also known as "Pájaro campana") e.g. for Paraguayan harp (Félix Pérez Cardozo); in some versions, the birdsong imitations can be very clearly heard.

== Composer ==
Barrios's compositions can be divided into three basic categories: folkloric, imitative and religious. Barrios paid tribute to the music and people of his native land by composing pieces modeled after folk songs from South America and Central America. Implementing the compositional style and techniques of the Baroque and Romantic periods was another side to his craftsmanship. Una Limosna por el Amor de Dios (Alms for the Love of God) is an example of a religiously-inspired work.

== Discography ==
- Agustin Barrios: The Complete Guitar Recordings 1913–1942 – 3-CD set transferred and digitally remastered from 78-rpm gramophone recordings from Atlanta, Odeon, Artigas labels and some of Barrios' personal home recordings, released by Chanterelle Historical Recordings in 1993.
- Agustín Barrios: Complete Music for Solo Guitar – a 6-CD-box released by Brilliant Classics in 2010

== Works ==
Romanza
Romanza en imitación al violoncello played by Barrios himself in 1923

Over 300 of Barrios' compositions and arrangements survive. Australian guitarist John Williams, former student of Andres Segovia, said of Barrios: "As a guitarist/composer, Barrios is the best of the lot, regardless of era. His music is better formed, it's more poetic, it's more everything! And it's more of all those things in a timeless way."

Outstanding pieces in his repertoire include:

- Abrí la Puerta Mi China
- Aconquija (Aire de Quena)
- Aire de Zamba
- Aire Popular Paraguayo
- Aires Andaluces
- Aires Criollos
- Aires Mudéjares (fragment)
- Aire Sureño (fragment)
- Allegro Sinfónico
- Altair
- A Mi Madre-serenata
- Arabescos
- Armonías de América
- Bicho Feo
- Canción de la Hilandera
- Capricho Español
- Suite "La Catedral" (Preludio—Andante religioso—Allegro solemne) (1921)
- Chôro da Saudade
- Confesión (Confissao de Amor)
- Contemplación
- Córdoba
- Cueca (Danza Chilena)
- Danza en Re Menor
- Danza Guaraní
- Danza Paraguaya no.1
- Danza Paraguaya no.2 'Jha, che valle'
- Danza Paraguaya (duet version)
- Diana Guaraní
- Dinora
- Divagación en Imitación al Violín
- Divagaciones Criollas
- Don Perez Freire
- El Sueño de la Muñequita
- Escala y Preludio
- Estilo Uruguayo
- Estilo
- Estudio de Concierto No.1 in A major
- Estudio de Concierto No.2 in A major
- Estudio del Ligado in A major
- Estudio del Ligado in D minor
- Estudio en Arpegio
- Estudio en Si Menor (solo and duet)
- Estudio en Sol Menor
- Estudio Inconcluso
- Estudio No. 3
- Estudio No. 6
- Estudio Para Ambas Manos
- Estudio Vals
- Fabiniana
- Gavota al Estilo Antiguo
- Habanera
- Humoresque
- Invocación a Mi Madre
- Jha, Che Valle
- Julia Florida
- Junto a tu Corazón
- Jota
- La Bananita (tango)
- La Samaritana
- Las Abejas
- Leyenda de España
- Leyenda Guarani
- Una Limosna por el Amor de Dios (or "El ultimo trémolo" or "El último canto")
- London Carapé
- Luz Mala
- Mabelita
- Madrecita
- Madrigal Gavota
- Maxixe
- Mazurka Apasionata
- Medallón Antiguo
- Milonga
- Minuet in A major
- Minuet in A major
- Minuet in B major
- Minuet in C major
- Minuet in C minor
- Minuet in E major
- Oración (Oración de la Tarde)
- Oración por Todos
- Pepita
- Pericón in F
- Pericón in G
- Preludio Op. 5, No. 1
- Preludio in E major
- Preludio in A minor
- Preludio in C major
- Preludio in C minor
- Preludio in D minor
- Preludio in E minor
- Romanza en Imitación al Violoncello (Página d¹ Album, Fuegos Fátuos)
- Sargento Cabral
- Sarita
- Serenata Morisca
- Souvenir d'un rêve (more known as "Un sueño en la floresta")
- Tango No. 1
- Tango No. 2
- Tarantella (Recuerdos de Nápoles)
- Tua Imagem
- Vals de Primavera
- Vals Op. 8, No. 1 (Junto a tu Corazon)
- Vals Op. 8, No. 2
- Vals Op. 8, No. 3
- Vals Op. 8, No. 4
- Vals Tropical
- Variaciones sobre un Tema de Tárrega
- Variaciones sobre el Punto Guanacasteco
- Vidalita con variaciones in A minor
- Vidalita in D minor
- Villancico de Navidad
- Zapateado Caribe (trio)

He also wrote a couple of poems:

- Mi Guitarra
- El Bohemio

== Instruments ==
While in Paraguay, Barrios had access only to instruments of limited quality. However, soon after his arrival in Buenos Aires in 1910, he was exposed to, and played, the finest instruments of his time for the remainder of his career. Barrios normally traveled with two guitars, and had several modified with the addition of a 20th fret. He is documented by photograph to have played the instruments of Spanish luthiers Manuel Ramirez, José Ramírez I, Enrique García, Francisco Simplicio, Domingo Esteso, Enrique Sanfeliu and Ricardo Sanchis Nacher, Brazilian maker Di Giorgio, and in print by Uruguayan maker Rodolfo Camacho.

== In popular culture ==
On August 21, 2015, the film Mangoré – For the Love of Art was released in Asunción, based loosely on the life of Agustin Barrios, with a script and direction by the Chilean filmmaker Luis R. Vera. The guitarist was played by the Mexican actor Damián Alcázar and the Paraguayan actor Celso Franco, star of 7 Boxes. The music in the soundtrack was played by the Paraguayan guitarist Berta Rojas. The concert scenes were filmed using a guitar by Mexican guitar maker Federico Sheppard.

The Prelude for Barrios’s La Catedral is featured in the soundtrack for the 2001 Flight-Simulation video game Ace Combat 04.

== Bibliography ==
- Carlos Salcedo Centurion, El Inalcanzable Agustín Barrios Mangoré, 2007
- Richard D. Stover, Six Silver Moonbeams: The Life and Times of Agustin Barrios Mangoré, GSP (GSP210)
- Sila Godoy, Luis Szarán, Mangoré: Vida y Obra de Agustín Barrios, Editorial Don Bosco/Ñanduti Vive, Asunción, Paraguay
- Nicolás T. Riveros, Dos almas musicales: Agustín Pío Barrios y José del Rosario Diarte, Asunción, Paraguay
- Bacón Duarte Prado, Agustín Barrios, un genio insular. Editorial Araverá, Asunción del Paraguay, 1985 (in Spanish)
- Richard Pinnell, Frederick Sheppard, The Diary of Agustin Barrios
- Frederick Sheppard, Ramses Calderon, El Libro de Oro (vol. 1–6), Les Productions d'Oz
