= Villa Florida =

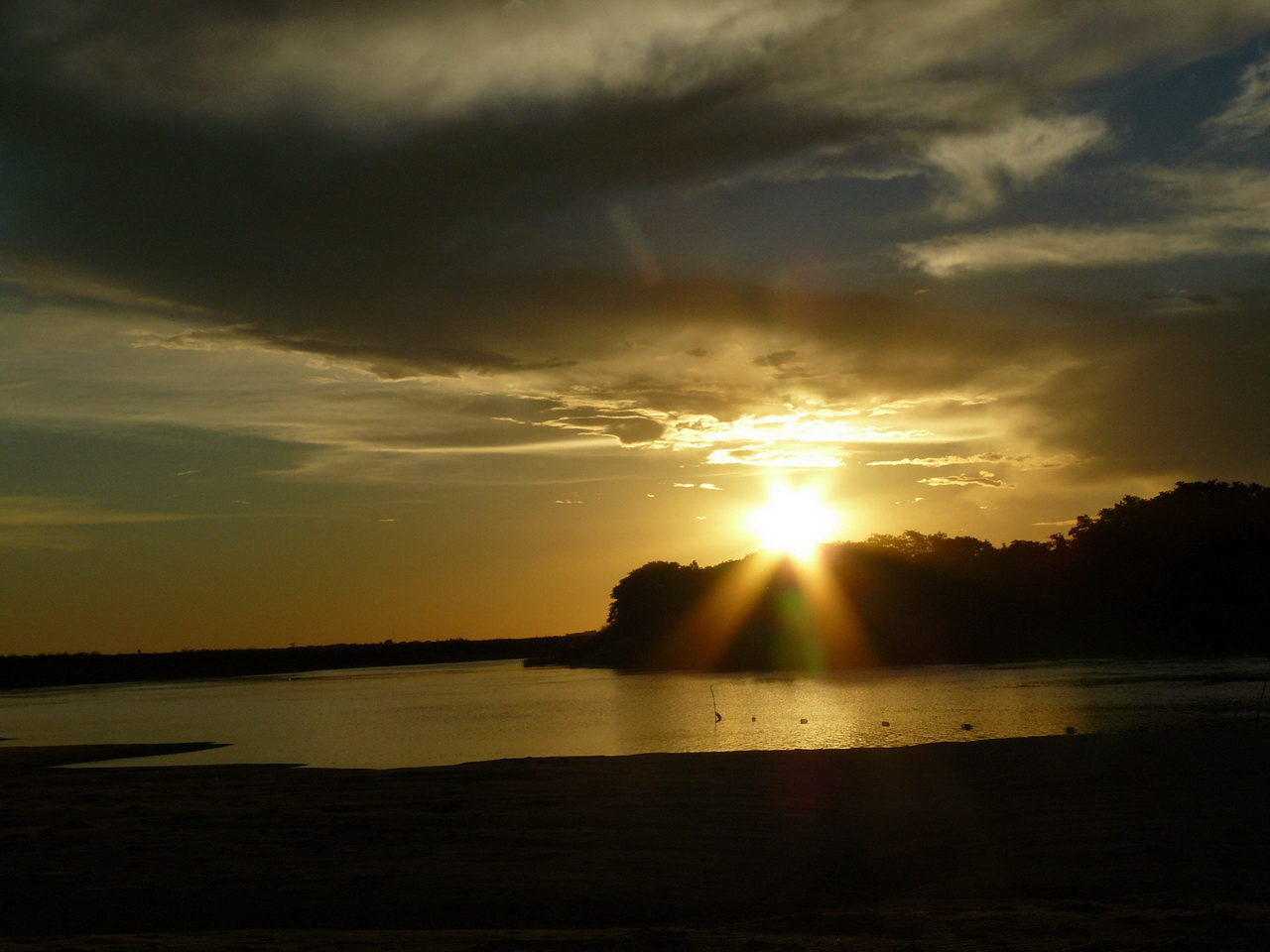
- Villa Florida beach sunset

- Location within Paraguay
- Coordinates: 26°24′27″S 57°07′44″W
- Country: Paraguay
- Department: Misiones
- Established: September 6, 1880 by Bernardino Caballero

Government
  - Intendente Municipal: Michel Flores (Colorados)

Area
  - Total: 196 km^{2} (76 sq mi)
- Elevation: 80 m (260 ft)

Population (2008)
  - Total: 2,914
  - Density: 15/km^{2} (39/sq mi)
- Time zone: -4 Gmt
- Postal code: 4820
- Area code: (595) (83)

Villa Florida is a city in southern Paraguay located on the Tebicuary River at the entrance of Misiones Region. Initially, when it was established by the Jesuits in 1632, it was called Paso Santa María. It was officially founded as a city on September 6, 1880 during Bernardino Caballero's government.

Villa Florida is 161 km (100 mi) from Asunción. Citizens mainly work on commercial activities, cattle raising and tourism, linked to the beautiful Tebicuary River. This river nearly encloses the city, and has wide white beaches.

One of the main annual festivities is the day of the city's festival, the Inmaculada Concepcion de Maria, celebrated on December 8.

== Geography ==
The land is mainly flat. The soil is rich in salts and minerals, which makes it especially good for cattle rising. Because of the soil characteristics, there are no forests, but some groves of trees are found close to the Tebicuary River. Close to the city there are some lime and iron mines that were exploited in the past.

Villa Florida is unusual in Paraguay in being one of the few districts that have no counties or scattered neighborhoods.

== Weather ==
The weather is mainly mild in the four months of southern-hemisphere winter and hot in summer: temperatures range from 25 to 35 Celsius (77-95 F) during eight months and from 3 to 24 Celsius (37-75 F) during winter. This city has good conditions for outdoor activities most of the year. Nevertheless, tourists should be careful with exposure to solar ultraviolet rays.

== Demography ==
There is nearly no population growth, because there are not enough job opportunities for young people, who migrate searching for alternatives to more populated cities.

== History ==
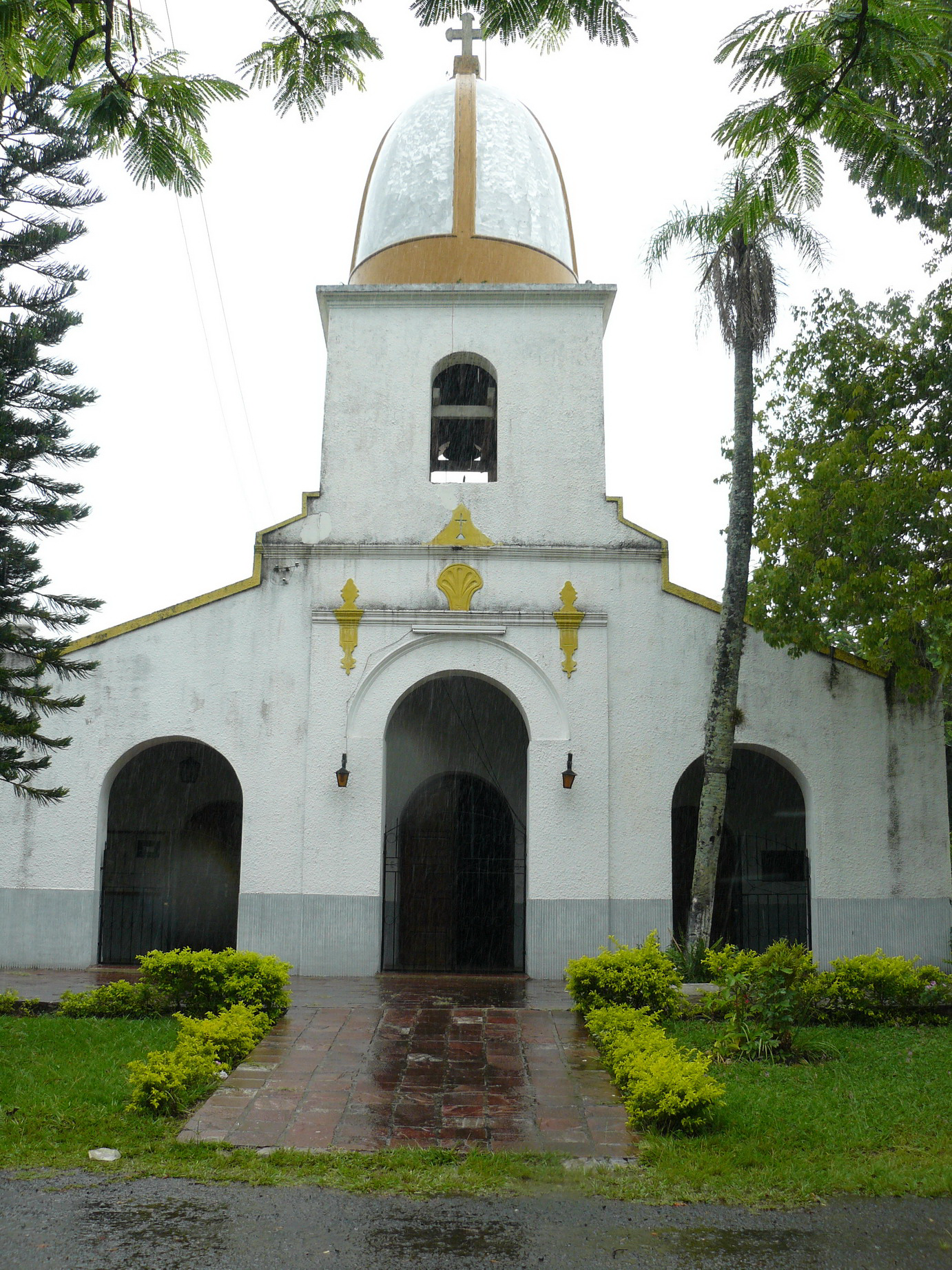
Iglesia principal de Villa Florida

Villa Florida was founded in September, 1880 by General Bernardino Caballero. Initially named Paso Santa Maria, it was located in the route that linked the center with the south of the country. That place was located approximately 800 meters (0.50 miles) upriver from where the bridge is now. (This bridge was inaugurated in 1968)

A well-maintained highway traces a straight line 19 km (12 mi) long that links Villa Florida with San Miguel City.

== Economy ==
The city economy is based mainly on tourism and cattle rising. Years ago, fishing was another special attraction, but waters were over exploited, without any respect for laws. During the 70s, Villa Florida was a must for fishing fans. Nowadays, only local people still fish there for their living.

== Transportation ==
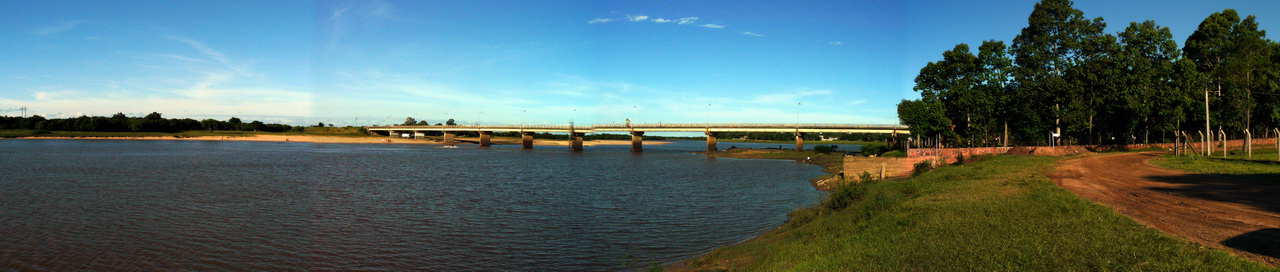
The Villa Florida Bridge

The city receives buses that are passing by or coming from Asuncion, Encarnación, and other places in Argentina. In Asuncion Bus Terminal, one can find buses going to Villa Florida or passing by the city in their route to Encarnación or San Juan Bautista every 30 minutes.

There is also a landing runway for small planes. Transit in the river is limited to boats and small crafts, since it is not deep.

== Arts and Culture ==
The city has a History Museum where carved wood images and stone sculptures are displayed. In the city's centennial a great cross was installed next to the church by the riverside. The city also owns a public library that many students use for school research.

The poet F. Aguiar described the melancholic feeling that arises when being away from this land in a beautiful song, "Villa Florida". Hilarión Correa composed the music. More references are available in Música Paraguaya.org.py The famous harpist Kike Pedersen also born in Villa Florida, where his artistic family resided.

== Tourism ==
Villa Florida is one of the most important centers of tourism in the country. There are many hotel and inns, one of them being run by the Tourism Office.

Ecologic Tourism is a must, due to the natural style of the place. Ranch Tourism is available. There are several places around the city that receive and host visitors.

Cabañas Museum is located in a former ranch 12 km (7.5 mi) from Villa Florida, heading to Caapucú. This ranch was once property of General Anastasio Cabañas, a hero in Cerro Porteño and Tacuary battles (1810), even before Paraguayan independence.

Villa Florida specialties are mainly river fish delicacies, as fish soup, Milanesa de Surubí, Surubí grillé and Surubí a la Napolitana.

== Notable people ==
One of the most important people from the Misiones Region, was the musician Agustín Barrios (Mangore), and Villa Florida was part of his life. Official records show that he was born in San Juan Bautista de las Misiones. His father was vice-consul from Argentina, because during that time Villa Florida was an international port. His mother was a local teacher. Even though some people state that he was born in Villa Florida, he was registered in San Juan Bastista records that at the moment were the most important city of the region, and had the office required for the procedure.

Luis Alberto Riart was also born in Villa Florida. He was President in 1924.

== City Hall ==
Since the return of the democracy in 1989, the city had four Mayors.

== Bibliography and references ==
- Geografía del Paraguay - Editorial Hispana Paraguay S.R.L.- 1a. Edición 1999 - Asunción Paraguay
- Geografía Ilustrada del Paraguay - ISBN 99925-68-04-6 - Distribuidora Arami S.R.L.
