= Elías Díaz Peña =

Paraguayan environmentalist

- Organization: Sobrevivencia
- Known for: Grassroot environmentalism
- Awards: Goldman Environmental Prize (2000)

Elias Diaz Peña is a Paraguayan environmentalist. He was awarded the Goldman Environmental Prize in 2000, jointly with Oscar Rivas, for their efforts to protect the ecosystems of the Paraná River and the Paraguay River.
