= Yacyretá Island =

Island in Paraguay

Native name: Isla Yacyretá / jasý retã
- Location within Paraguay
- Interactive map of Yacyretá Island

Geography
- Location: Paraná River
- Coordinates: 27°24′S 56°48′W

Administration
- Paraguay
- Itapúa

Demographics
- Population: 400

Yacyretá Island (Spanish: Isla Yacyretá; Guaraní: jasý retã "land of the Moon") is an island in the Itapúa Department, Paraguay, located in the Paraná River, sectioned by the Yacyretá Dam. Administratively, it is part of the southern province of Itapúa. It is known for its white sand dunes. It has a population of about 400 people who live mainly from fishing.

== See also ==
- Yaciretá Dam
- Geography of Paraguay
