= San Juan Bautista, Paraguay =

San Juan Bautista San Huã Vautísta
- City
- San Juan Bautista de las Misiones
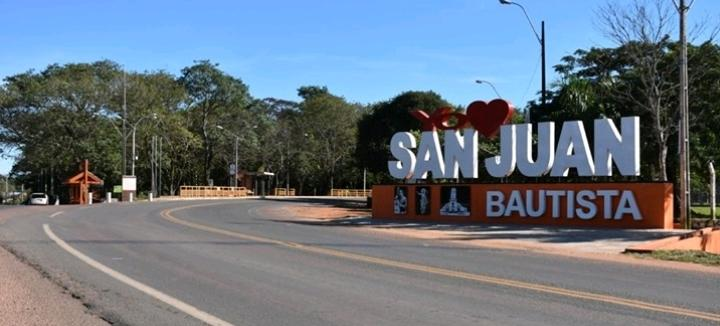
- Entrance to San Juan Bautista

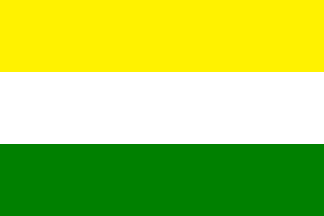
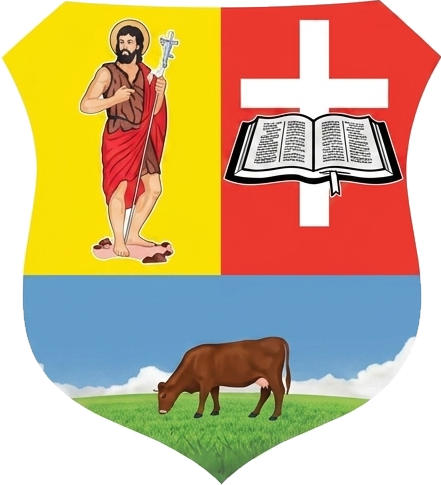
- Flag Coat of arms

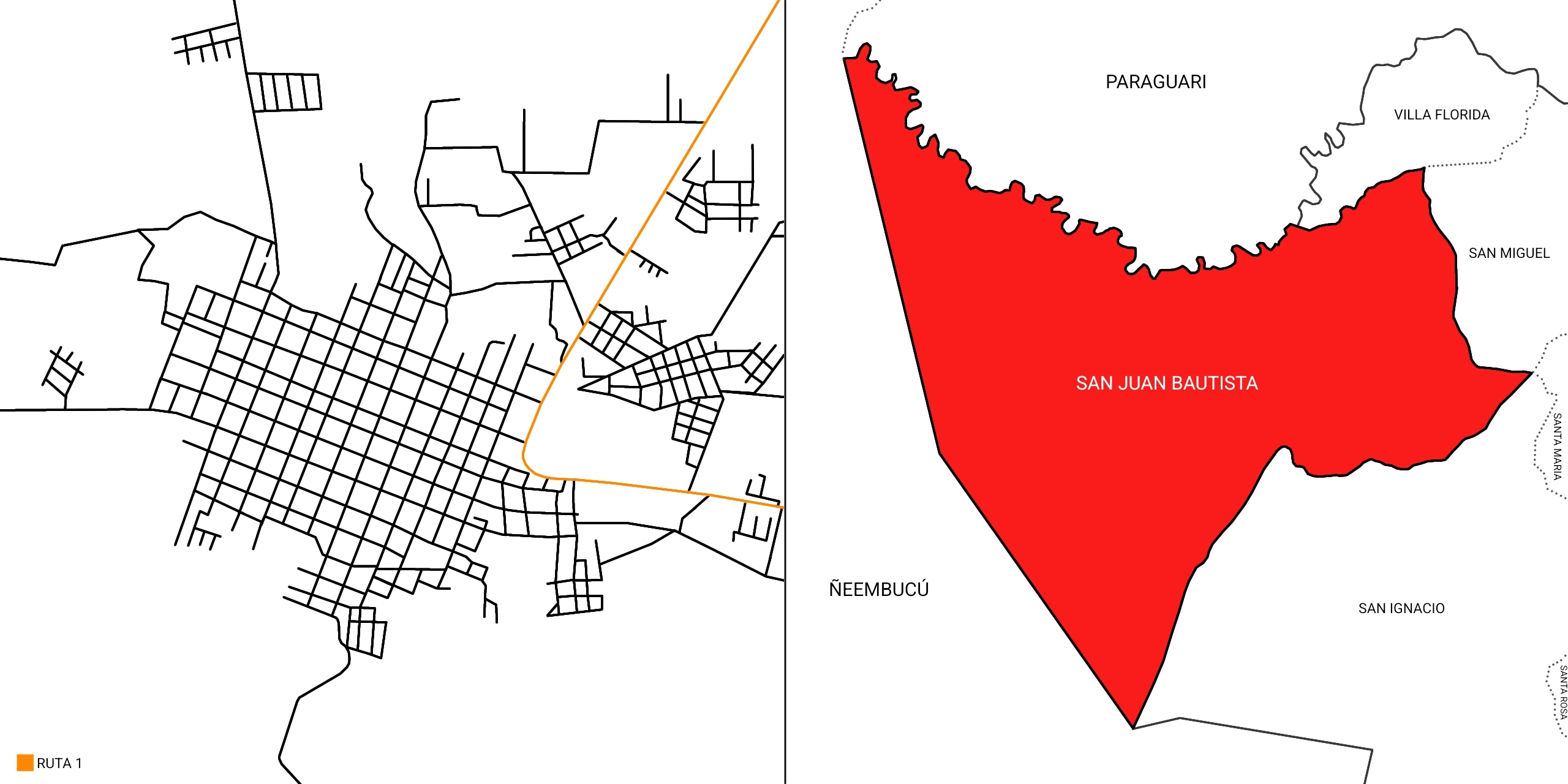

- Location within Paraguay
- Coordinates: 26°38′0″S 57°10′0″W
- Country: Paraguay
- Department: Misiones
- Founded: 1893

Government
  - Intendente Municipal: Sr. Andrés María Riveros Obregón (PLRA)

Area
  - Total: 5 km^{2} (1.9 sq mi)
- Elevation: 61 m (200 ft)

Population
  - Total: 16,593
  - Density: 3,300/km^{2} (8,600/sq mi)
- Postal code: 4700
- Area code: +595 (81)

San Juan Bautista (Spanish pronunciation: [saŋ ˈxwam bawˈtista]; Guarani: San Huã Vautísta), capital of the Department of Misiones, Paraguay, is considered the cradle of the religious mission culture. The city is the seat of the Roman Catholic Diocese of San Juan Bautista de las Misiones.

== Geography ==
San Juan Bautista Misiones is located 196 kilometers south of Asunción. One can travel to the city by following the Route 1st “Mcal. Francisco Solano López”.

=== Climate ===
The climate is humid subtropical, with Cfa designation in Köppen climate classification. The maximum temperature is 32.6 °C (90.7 °F) in January and 22.6 °C (72.7 °F) in July. The minimum temperature in July is 11.4 °C (52.5 °F), while in January it is 21.4 °C (70.5 °F). The annual average temperature is 21.7 °C (71.1 °F) and annual precipitation is over 1,600 mm (63 in).

Climate data for San Juan Bautista (1991–2020)
Month	Jan	Feb	Mar	Apr	May	Jun	Jul	Aug	Sep	Oct	Nov	Dec	Year
Record high °C (°F)	42.5 (108.5)	41.7 (107.1)	41.5 (106.7)	37.0 (98.6)	36.0 (96.8)	35.2 (95.4)	34.2 (93.6)	38.8 (101.8)	40.2 (104.4)	41.6 (106.9)	41.0 (105.8)	40.6 (105.1)	42.5 (108.5)
Mean daily maximum °C (°F)	32.6 (90.7)	31.9 (89.4)	31.0 (87.8)	28.3 (82.9)	24.3 (75.7)	23.0 (73.4)	22.8 (73.0)	25.3 (77.5)	26.5 (79.7)	28.7 (83.7)	30.1 (86.2)	31.9 (89.4)	28.0 (82.4)
Daily mean °C (°F)	26.7 (80.1)	25.9 (78.6)	24.7 (76.5)	22.0 (71.6)	18.4 (65.1)	16.9 (62.4)	16.1 (61.0)	18.1 (64.6)	19.9 (67.8)	22.3 (72.1)	23.8 (74.8)	25.7 (78.3)	21.7 (71.1)
Mean daily minimum °C (°F)	21.4 (70.5)	21.0 (69.8)	19.9 (67.8)	17.4 (63.3)	14.2 (57.6)	12.6 (54.7)	11.4 (52.5)	13.0 (55.4)	14.9 (58.8)	17.6 (63.7)	18.9 (66.0)	20.5 (68.9)	16.9 (62.4)
Record low °C (°F)	13.2 (55.8)	10.5 (50.9)	8.0 (46.4)	5.2 (41.4)	1.5 (34.7)	−1.0 (30.2)	−1.2 (29.8)	−0.6 (30.9)	1.6 (34.9)	6.4 (43.5)	7.0 (44.6)	9.4 (48.9)	−1.2 (29.8)
Average precipitation mm (inches)	165.1 (6.50)	137.8 (5.43)	122.3 (4.81)	184.7 (7.27)	136.0 (5.35)	92.6 (3.65)	72.3 (2.85)	69.4 (2.73)	105.2 (4.14)	195.4 (7.69)	174.5 (6.87)	177.3 (6.98)	1,632.7 (64.28)
Average precipitation days (≥ 0.1 mm)	9	8	8	8	7	7	6	7	7	9	8	7	91
Average relative humidity (%)	65	68	70	71	73	74	71	69	67	64	64	62	68
Mean monthly sunshine hours	244.9	251.7	233.0	185.2	148.2	151.6	169.0	217.0	209.5	228.6	260.6	290.5	2,553.5
Source 1: NOAA,(extremes-precipitation days-humidity 1961-1990), Meteomanz(extremes 2000-2023)
Source 2: Meteo Climat (sun, 1991-2020)

== Demography ==
With a total area of 2,300 square kilometers, San Juan Bautista has a population of 18,441 inhabitants, 9,281 male and 9,161 female, according to projections of the General Office of Statistics, Surveys and Censuses. The city is the third most populated one in Misiones, after San Ignacio and Ayolas.

== History ==
This city was established during the government of Carlos Antonio López, declared a small town in 1893, and in 1945 was made the capital of the department.

== Economy ==
San Juan Bautista is an agricultural and livestock area. It produces soy, wheat, cotton, rice and corn. livestock is also important there.

Te Guaraní- natural products for health life style. Distribuidora Pilar -Wholesale Company of household cleaning Staff.

== Tourism ==
Important educational institutions, como el colegio diocesano misionero government institutions, the bishopric, and health centers are located in the city. The church is a Jesuit style relic.

There are springs and streams in the city. At Lilly's Island, in San Cristobal, a diversity of these flowers may be seen.

During the holidays honoring the city's patron saint, Saint John the Baptist, processions, riding on horseback, colt taming, and bullfights are held. Some typical foods eaten then are batiburrillo, asado a la estaca and caburé.

In January, the party of Siriki is celebrated.

The house of Mangoré, today a museum and a cultural center, is frequented by tourists.

Other interesting locations in the vicinity are:

- The art gallery “El Viejo Taller”
- The “Monseñor Rojas” Theater
- Seminario Diocesano San José
- The Boquerón square, with a fountain in its center
- The pyramids constructed honoring the veterans of the Chaco War and the country

== Transportation ==
Beyond San Juan Bautista, an unpaved road goes to Santa María. Another road also goes to Route 4th and to Pilar in Ñeembucú.

== Notable people ==
- Celeste Amarilla, lawyer and politician
- Agustín Pío Barrios, guitarist
- Gustavo Gómez, footballer

== Gallery ==
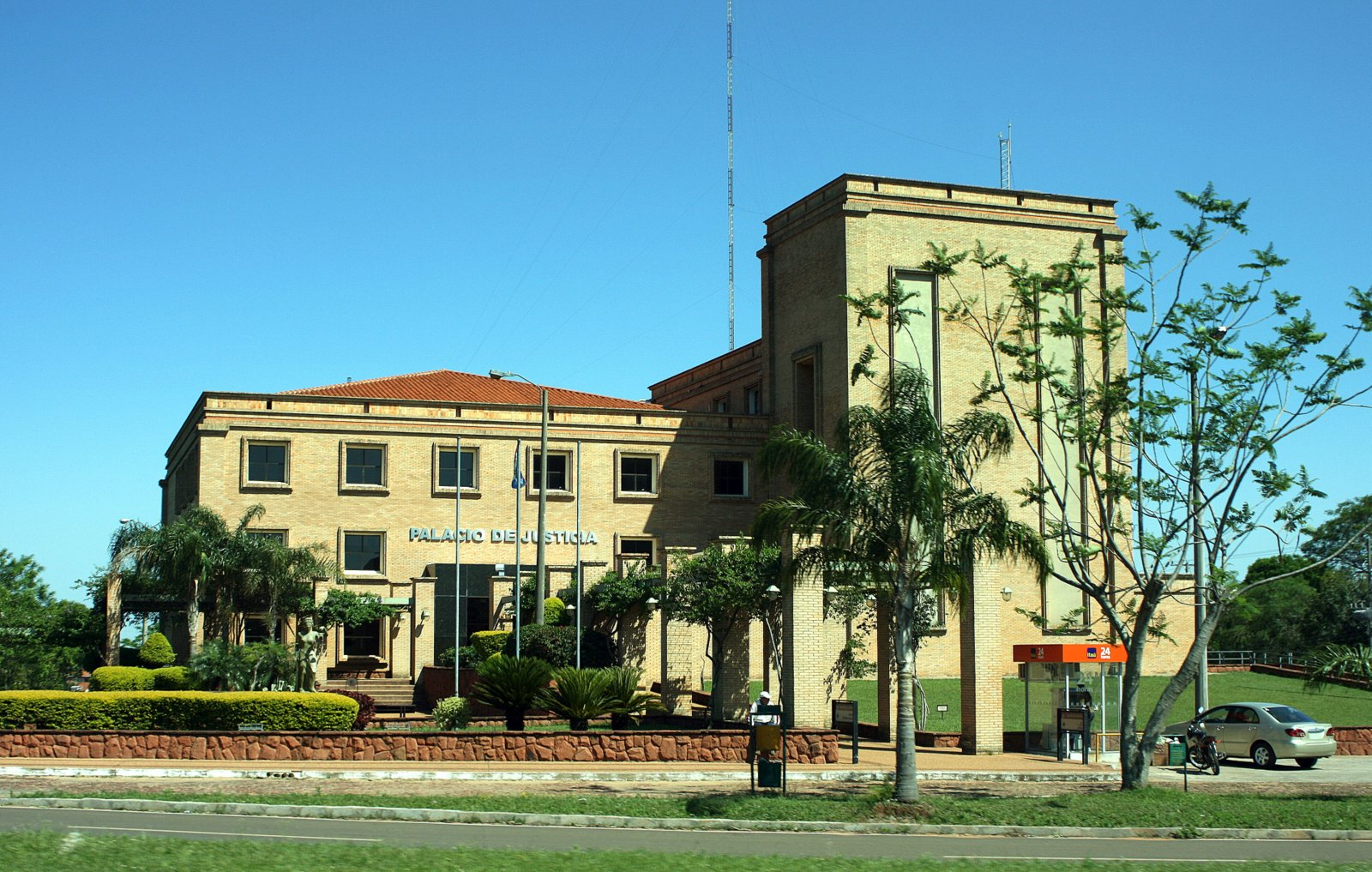
Court building at San Juan Bautista, Paraguay

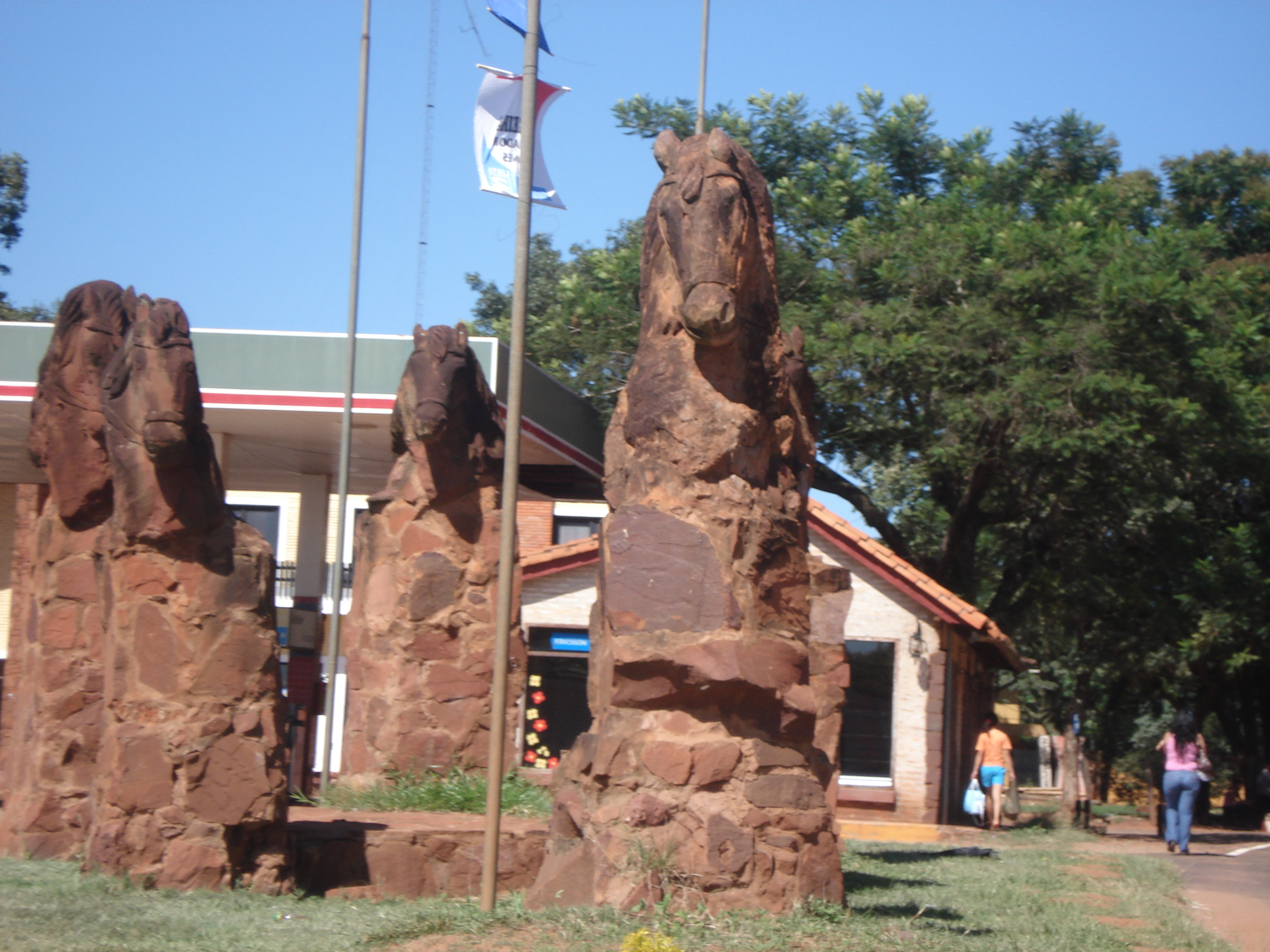
San Juan Bautista, Paraguay

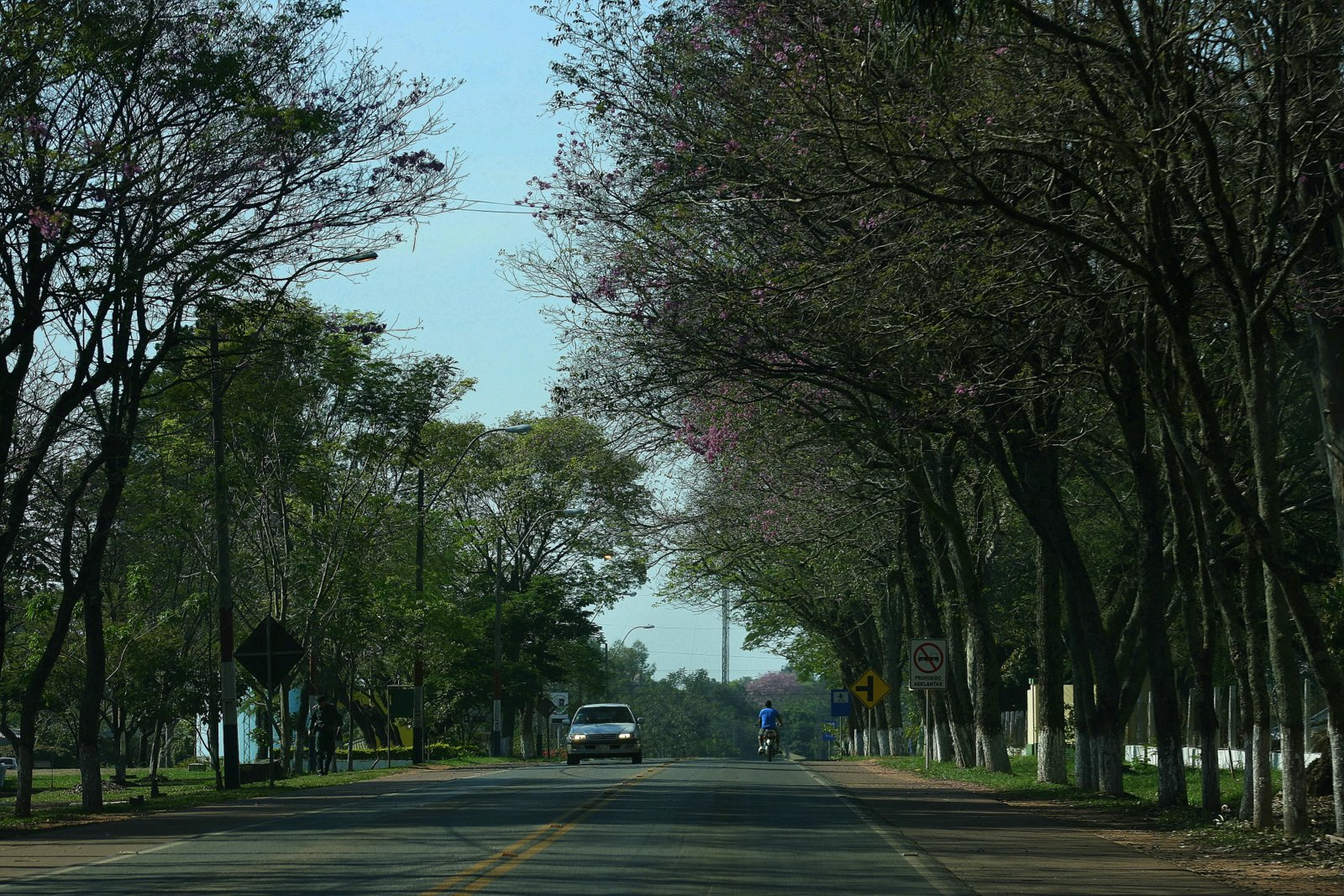
San Juan Bautista, Paraguay

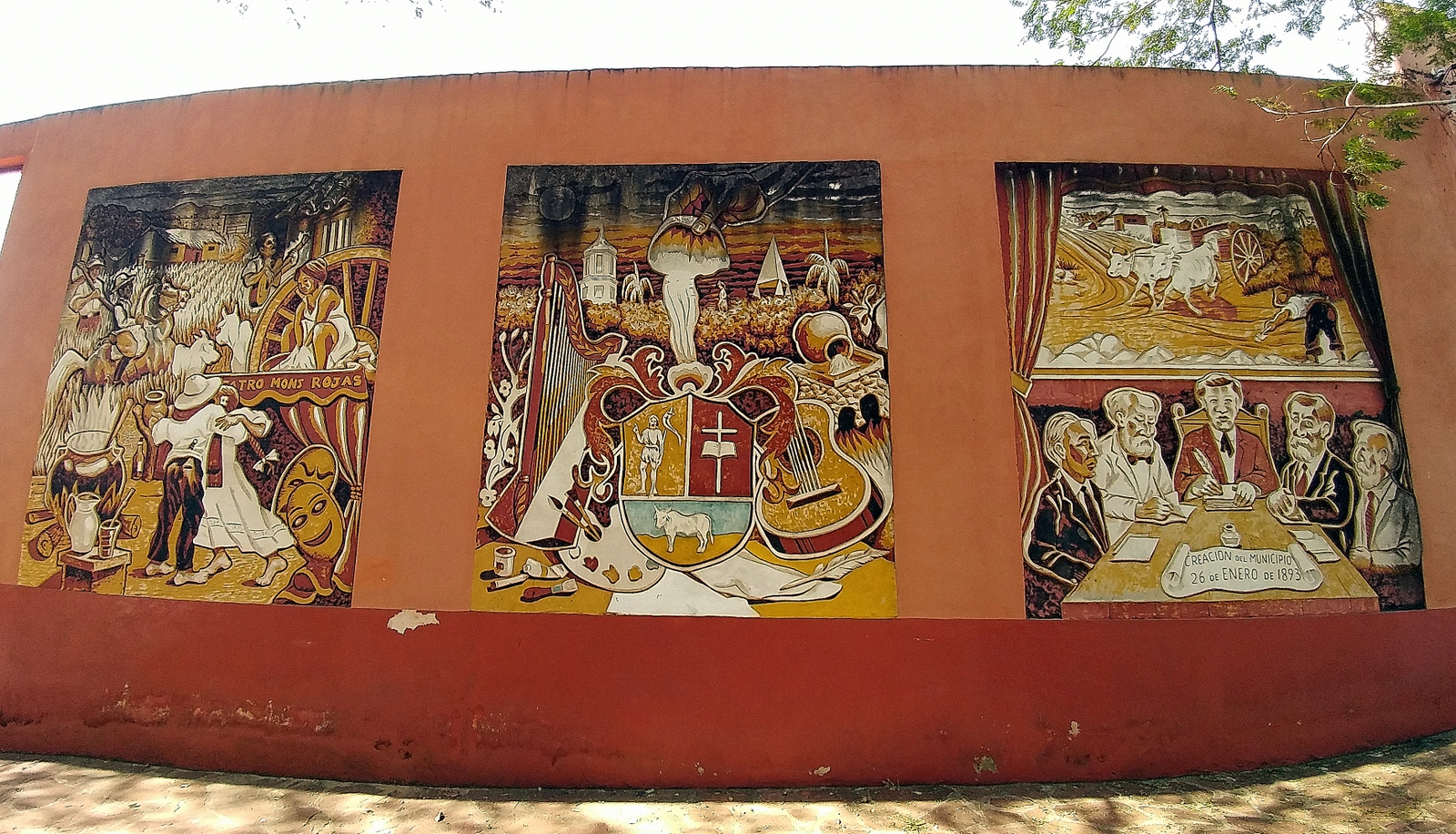
San Juan Bautista, Paraguay

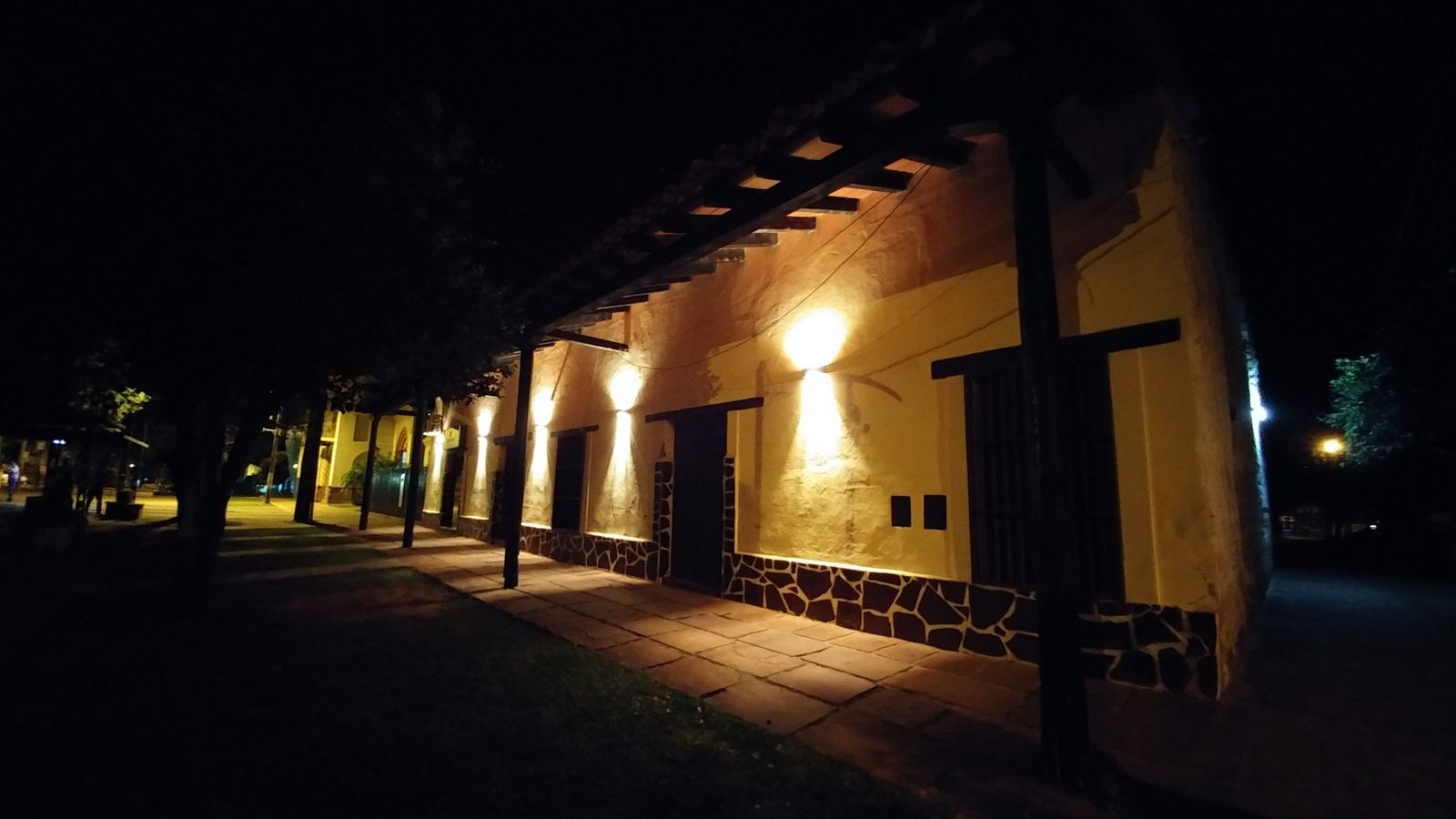
Old houses colonnade at one corner of Plaza Mariscal Estigarribia in San Juan Bautista, Paraguay.

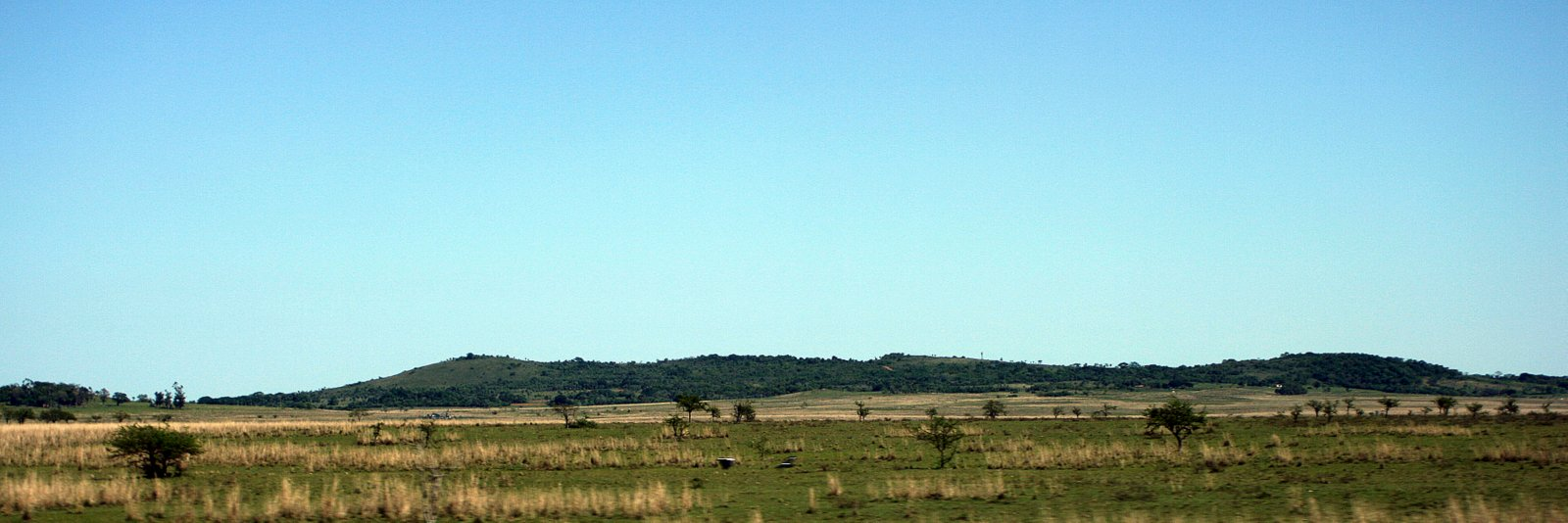
Cerro Perõ, outside San Juan Bautista, Paraguay

== Twin towns ==
San Juan Bautista, Paraguay is twinned with:

- Luque, Paraguay
- San Juan, Argentina
