= Ayolas =

- District
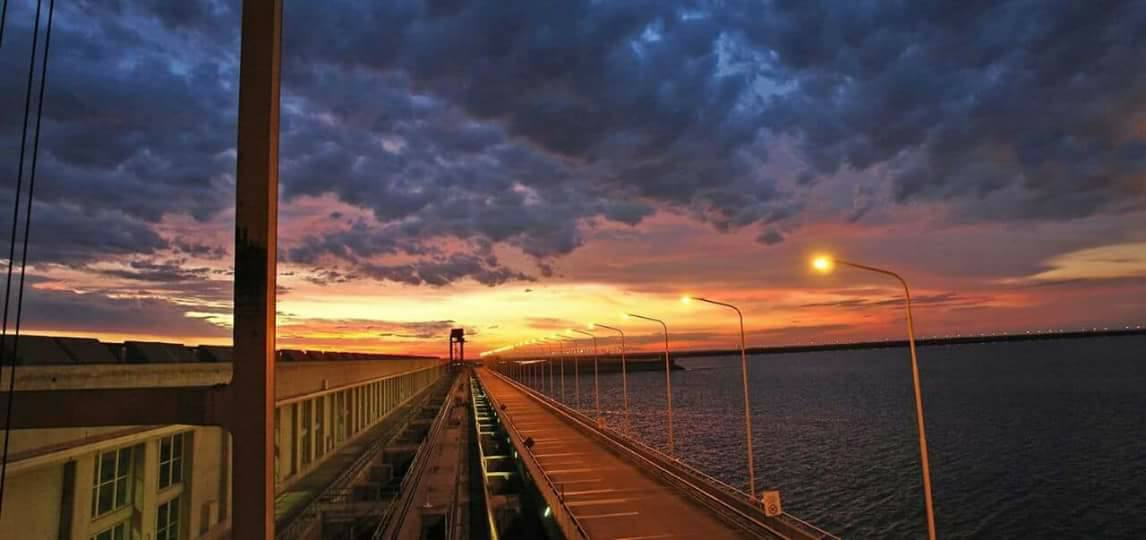
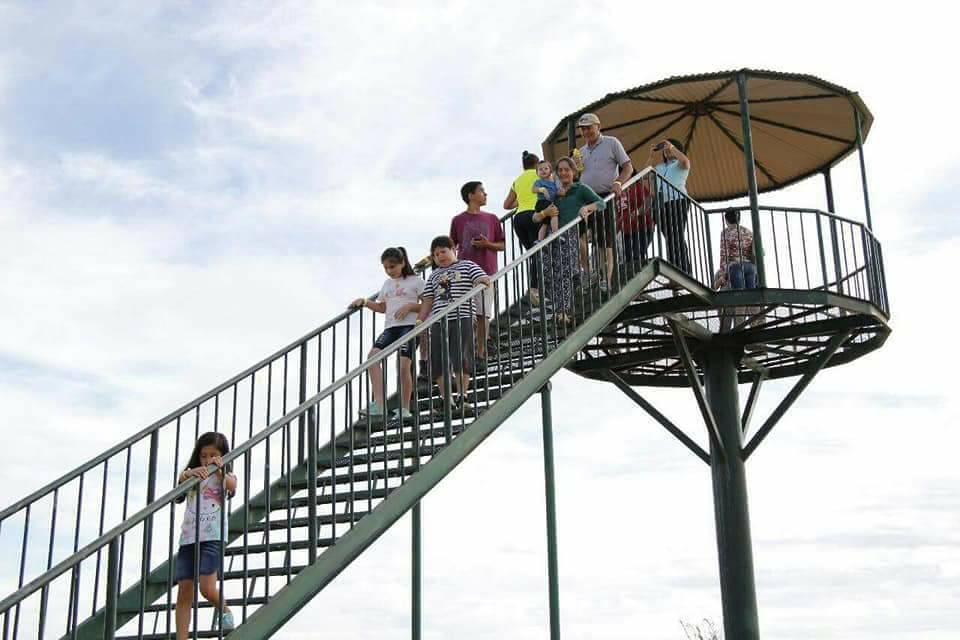
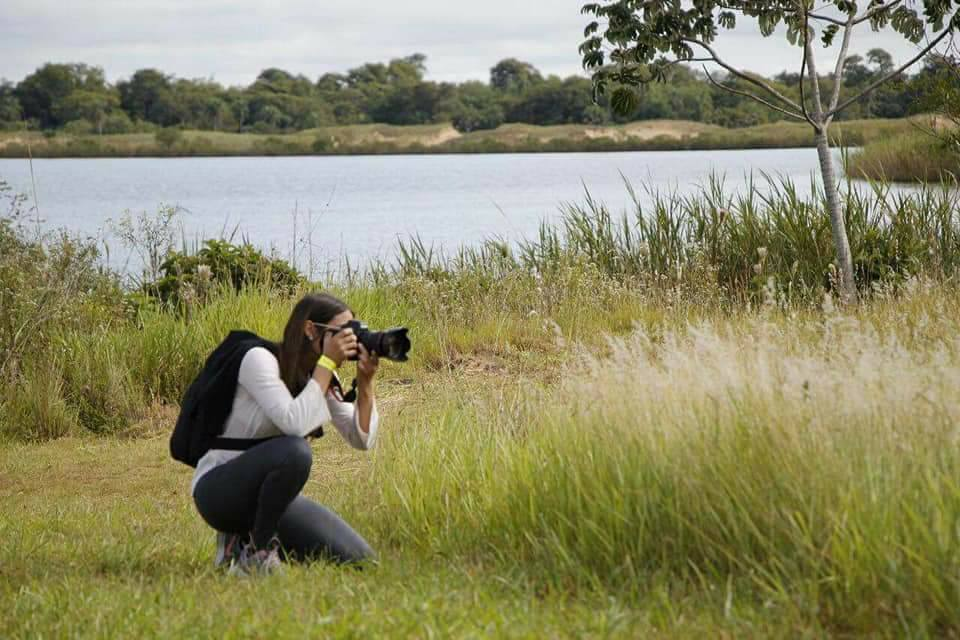
- Clockwise from top: a view of the sunset from the coast, people getting off a watchtower and a photographer taking pictures.

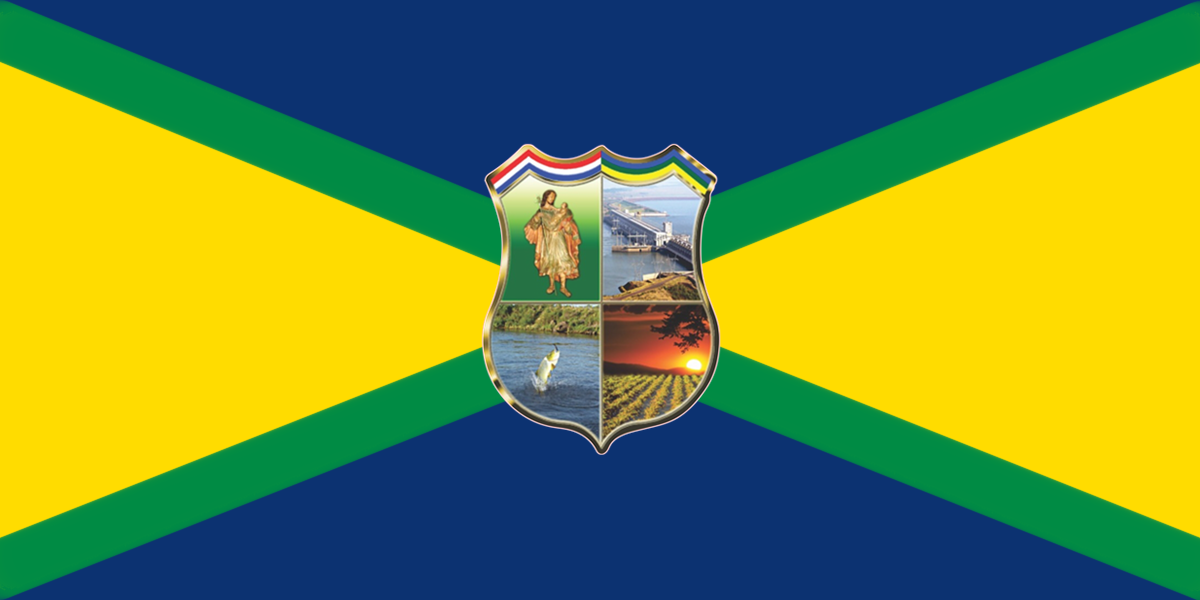
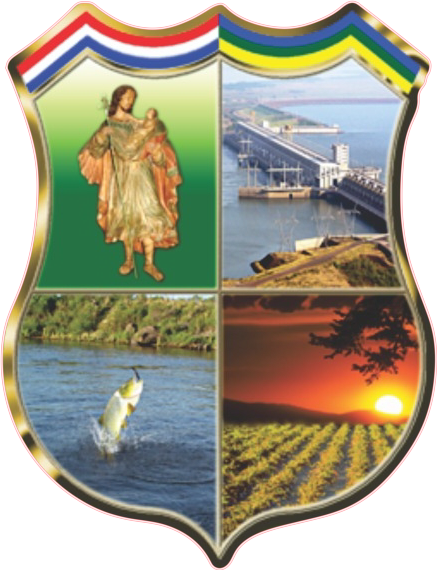
- Flag Coat of arms
- Etymology: Juan de Ayolas
- Nickname(s): A Paradise by the River
- Location within Paraguay

Government
  - Mayor: Carlos María Arrechea Ortiz (ANR)

Area
  - Total: 122 km^{2} (47 sq mi)
- Elevation: 70 m (230 ft)

Population
  - 2023 estimate: 19,739
  - Density: 622/km^{2} (1,611.0/sq mi)
- Time zone: UTC-4
- Calling code: 72
- Website: https://www.municipalidadayolas.gov.py

Ayolas is a city in the department of Misiones, Paraguay, located at 310 km southeast of Asunción, on the banks of the Paraná River. It is, also, the name of the district within which the city is located.

== Toponymy ==
The city takes its name on behalf of Juan de Ayolas, second of Pedro de Mendoza, who founded Puerto la Candelaria, now Fuerte Olimpo, on the Paraguay River. He is believed to have been killed by Chaco Indians, because he disappeared and never was heard of again.

Before being called Ayolas, it was known as "Paraje San Josemí", in accordance with the foundation decree that established that Ayolas should be founded in Coratei, but because the founders found that Coratei was a desolate place, they decided to found Ayolas in Paraje San Jose mi, which was a Jesuit port, and had a certain amount of population, had a church, plaza and had more status than that of Coratei for that reason Ayolas was founded in San Jose Mi and not in Coratei.

== Geography ==
Ayolas is located on the south of the country, near the towns of Santiago, San Juan Bautista and San Ignacio, opposite Ituzaingó, Argentina. It is on the north bank of the Paraná River, at the border with Argentina, and is close to the Yacyretá Dam.

It was a simple fishing village, which has been completely transformed with the construction of the Yacyretá Hydroelectric, with modern infrastructures, which make it the most modern city in the department of Misiones. Corateí beach, with its white sands, is very visited by tourists, in summer, water sports are practiced there.

In summer, the maximum temperature is 41 °C, the minimum in winter is generally 0 °C. The annual average is 21 °C. In terms of seismicity, the region responds to the "Paraná River" and "Uruguay River" sub-faults, with low seismicity. Its last expression occurred with the Ituzaingó tremor of 2009, with 3.5.3

The Civil Defense must warn about listening and obeying about severe, infrequent storms, and low seismicity, with seismic silence of 12 years due to the "Paraná River sub-fault" and the "Uruguay River"

18 km from the Permanent Villa of Ayolas, there is an area of 100 ha, where various animal species are housed in conditions of survival and reproduction, in the Atinguy Refuge. This refuge has been maintained by the Yacyretá Binational Entity since 1982. Guided tours are made along specially marked trails. The native animals of the area of influence of the dam are protected in order to disseminate and develop captive breeding programs for species with conservation problems.

=== Weather ===
In the summer, the maximum temperature is about 39 °C, the minimum in winter is −2 °C generally. The annual median is around 21 °C.

== Demography ==
Ayolas has a population of 15,219 inhabitants, from which 7,749 are male and 7,470, female. In the rural area there are 10,851 and in the urban area, 4,368 people; being the second city most inhabited of the department, after San Ignacio.

== History ==
The city of Ayolas was founded in 1840 by Patricio Aquino, on a request made by José Gaspar Rodríguez de Francia.

In Ayolas, the Binational Entity of Yacyreta is located within the city area. When the dam was being built, the city was projected from scratch right next to the original town settlement (also known as "el pueblo" locally) so that the workforce could be properly lodged. As such the Villa Permanente was raised in 1979 as a model town with 4 basic house models in a very organize arrangement, as well as modern schools, malls, water treatment plant, hospital, police stations, and a bus terminal. As the dam project advanced and more workforce was needed the same process led to the creation of the “Mil viviendas” (thousand houses) or "Nucleo 1" and then "Nucleo 2" housing neighborhoods in the mid-1980s. These housing solutions were offered free of charge to workers to encourage them to move from more populated cities. In most cases, the regular utilities as potable water, electricity, and phone were covered by the employer, at least until the late '90s.

The district is famous for fishing and specifically for fishing "EL DORADO", after the completion of the Yacyretá hydroelectric power plant, it is promoted as a tourist attraction in the area, it is currently visited by thousands of tourists from the country and the world.

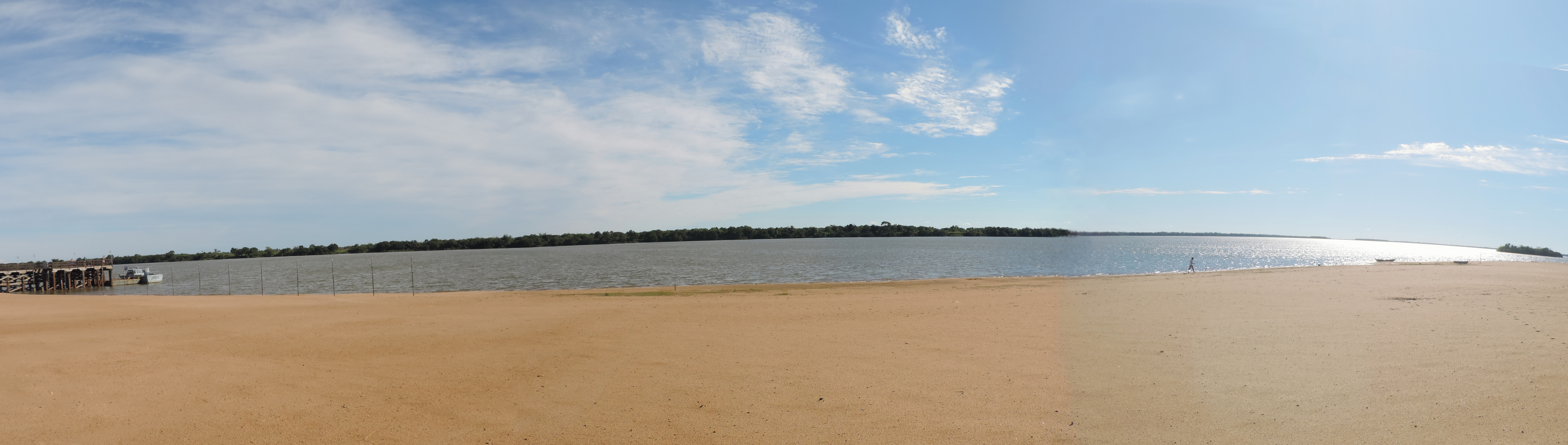
Paraná River, in Ayolas, Southern Paraguay

== Economy ==
The people from Ayolas are dedicated to livestock, trade, and fishing. Being fishing, the characteristic activity, for which the city is known. Although due to the construction of the "Yacyreta Binational Dam", working on it has become one of the main sources of work and income for the population of Ayolas that grows around it.

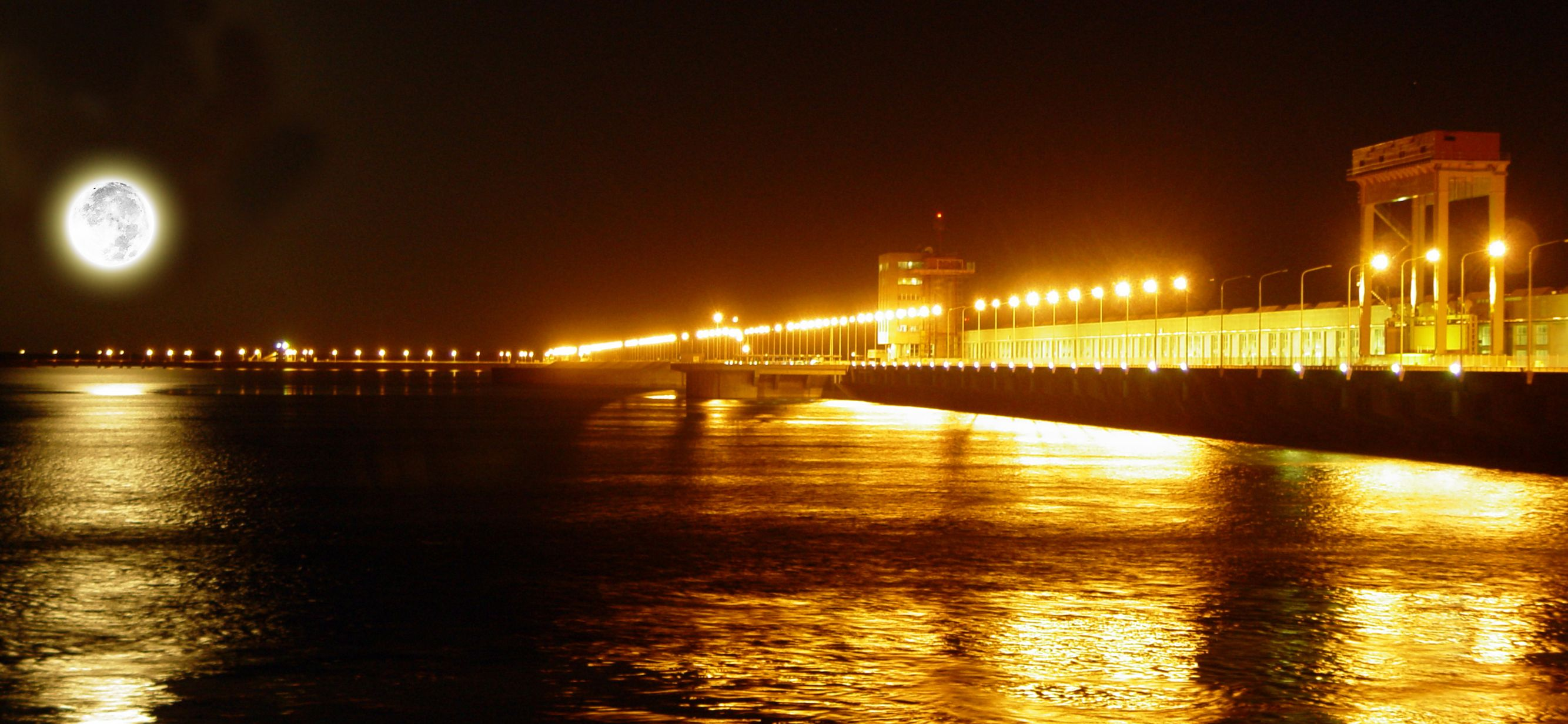
The night view at the Yacyreta dam

Near the town is the hydroelectric dam of Yacyretá, "country of the moon" due to its location near an island which coexists with unique ecosystems in Paraguay. The Arary forest and the wide dunes with clear lagoons stand out. This dam gave rise to many jobs in the town and in the surroundings, it is the work of Paraguayans and Argentines.

== Transportation ==
The city is home for the Juan de Ayolas Airport, however, there is no commercial air traffic at the airport.

== Twin towns ==
Ayolas is twinned with:

- Diamante, Argentina
