= Yacyretá Dam =

Dam on the Paraná River on the border of Argentina and Paraguay

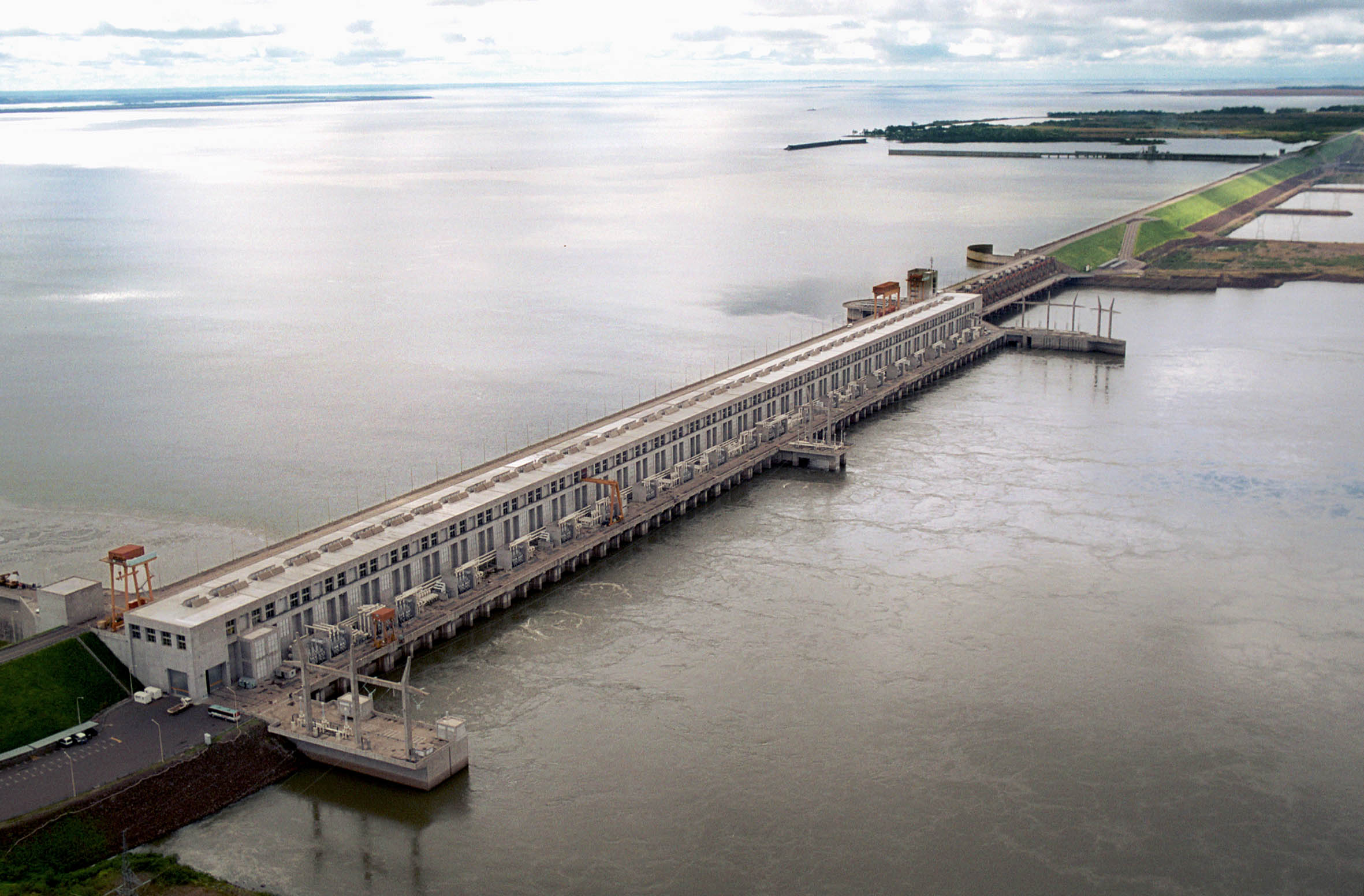
- View of the dam from down-river

- Location of the dam on the Argentina–Paraguay border
- Official name: Jasyretâ-Apipé Hydroelectric Power Station
- Country: Paraguay/Argentina
- Coordinates: 27°28′57.68″S 56°43′29.95″W
- Status: In use
- Construction began: 1983
- Opening date: 1994
- Construction cost: $15 billion

Dam and spillways
- Spillway type: Service, gate-controlled
- Spillway capacity: 55,000 m^{3}/s (1,900,000 cu ft/s)

Power Station
- Commission date: 1994–1998, 2011
- Hydraulic head: 22 m (72 ft)
- Turbines: 20 × 155 MW (208,000 hp) Kaplan turbines
- Installed capacity: 3,100 MW (4,200,000 hp) (final design)
- Annual generation: 20.091 TWh (72.33 PJ)
- Website https://www.eby.org.ar/, https://www.eby.gov.py/

The Yacyretá Dam or Jasyretâ-Apipé Hydroelectric Power Station (from Guaraní jasy retã, "land of the moon") is a dam and hydroelectric power plant built over the waterfalls of Jasyretâ-Apipé in the Paraná River, between the Paraguayan City of Ayolas and the Argentine Province of Corrientes. The dam is named for Yacyretá Island just upstream, much of which the dam submerged. The word "Yacyreta" is the Hispanicized spelling of the original Guaraní term Jasyretâ.

The dam is 808 metres (2,651 ft) long, and its installed equipment has a maximum power output of 3,100 megawatts (4,200,000 hp), with a record maximum annual power output of 20.091 TWh (72.33 PJ) achieved in year 2012, and a maximum water flow rate of 55,000 cubic meters per second. Until February 2011, its reservoir was seven meters below its planned water level, only allowing it to operate at 60% capacity.

The project generated controversy and criticism during its planning and construction because of the effects it had on local ecology, particularly the flooding of a unique environment causing the extinction in the wild of several species. The financial management of the project also garnered criticism, as it greatly exceeded its original budget, ultimately costing more than $11 billion. On 18 September 2006 Paraguay agreed to settling its part of the overall debt of $11,000,000,000 owed to Argentina for the construction of Yaciretá by paying in electricity, at the rate of 8,000 GWh per year for 40 years.

In 2014, Paraguay consumed almost 5% of its share of Yacyreta's production, exporting the rest to Argentina.

The Yacyreta Dam is managed by the Yacyreta Bi-National Entity, established by treaty between the two countries.

== Geography ==
Yacyretá is located 260 kilometres (160 mi) southeast of Asunción. It is located in the region of a city called Ayolas, 100 kilometres (62 mi) downstream from Encarnación and 2 kilometres (1.2 mi) away from the rapids of Apipé. The main dam is near the islands of Jasyretâ and Talavera.

== Chronology ==
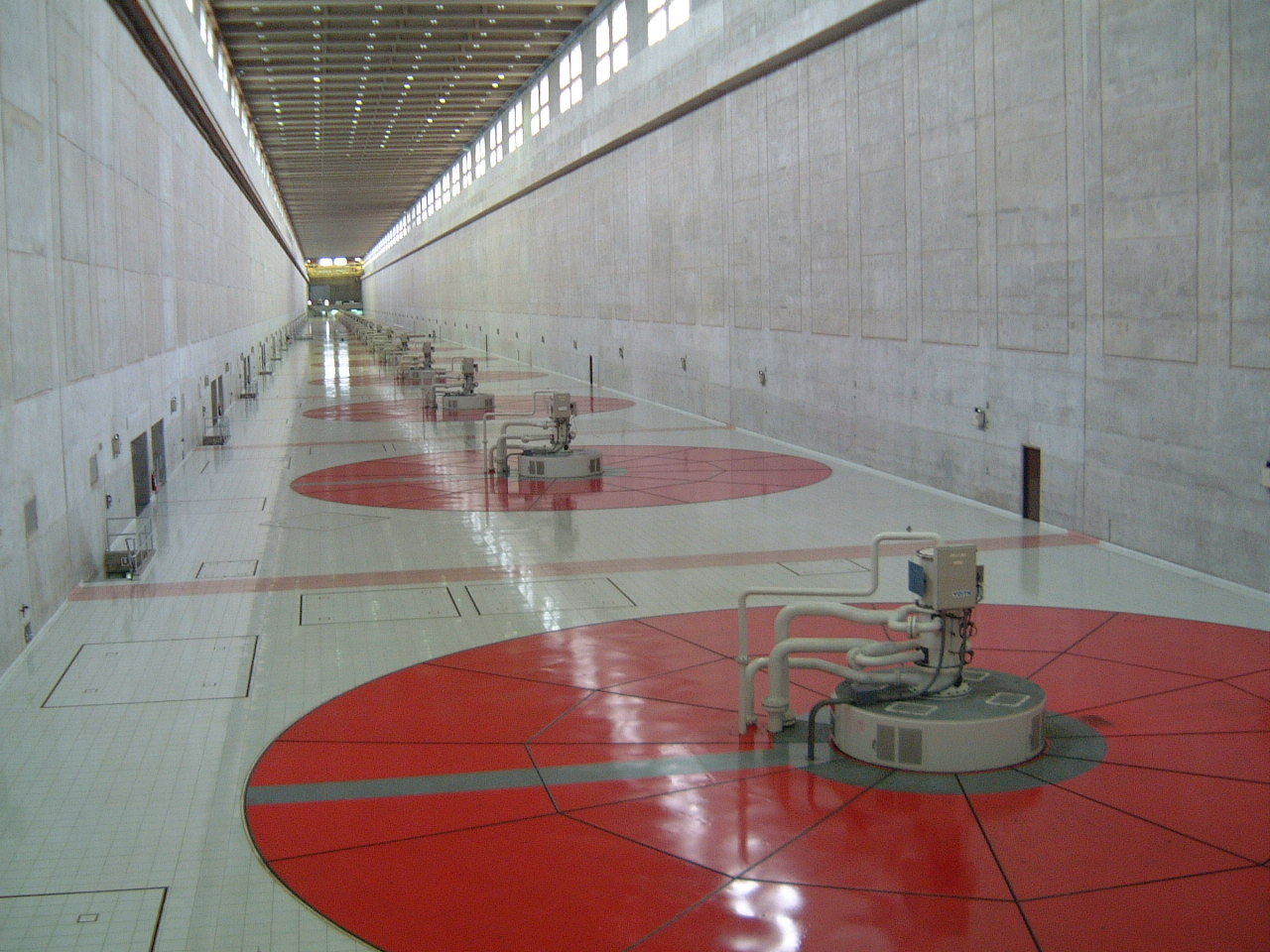
Generator hall

The initial protocol to determine the use of the waterfalls was signed on February 1, 1925, in the United States. However, it was not until January 1958 that the Technical Argentine-Paraguayan Commission was created to undertake technical studies of the uses of the river. The studies were presented on December 3, 1973, in Asunción and the Treaty of Yasyreta was signed; both countries compromised to embark together in the construction. For that, the Bi-National Organization Yasyreta was founded. Each state would share jurisdiction and responsibility for executing studies and projects related to the dam.

The construction started on December 3, 1983; on April 26, 1989, agreements were signed that defined the definitive plans for the protection of the valleys and streams to the right side of the river (Paraguay). In June of the same year the main branch of the river was closed and on May 19, the other branch, Aña Kuá, was also closed. On June 1, 1993, the navigational ship lock was opened, and on September 2, 1994, the first hydroelectric Kaplan turbine began operation. The 20 programmed units functioned for the first time together on July 7, 1998.

== Construction ==
In addition to the dam, a barrage of materials 65 kilometres (40 mi) long closes both arms of the river divided by the island Jasyretâ; the hydroelectric dam is in part located over this. Both extremes are settled in the Argentine coast, in the locality of Rincón Santa María and in the Paraguayan coast, near the city of San Cosme y Damián. The artificial lake formed by the dam rises 21 metres (69 ft) above the original level and covers 1,600 square kilometres (620 sq mi).

Each branch has a slope. The turbines are in the main branch, in a slope with eighteen gates that allow a maximum flow of 55,000 cubic meters per second. The other branch of the river has sixteen more gates with a capacity for another 40,000 cubic meters per second.

A ship lock excavated in the basaltic bedrock allows passage of boats with draft up to 12 feet (3.6 m). A fish ladder, designed after the ecological studies proved that the presence of the dam inhibited the reproduction of certain migratory species of the Paraná River, especially the dorado and surubí, allows fish that swim upstream to cover the 25-meter difference to spawn in the Alto Paraná.

The machine house is 70 meters high. The waterfall, currently 15 meters high, has an average volume of 8,000 cubic meters per second that pass through the turbines and produces energy continuously. For comparison, the falls of Iguazú are 70 meters high, with a volume of 1,750 cubic meters per second.

== Population and ecological impact ==
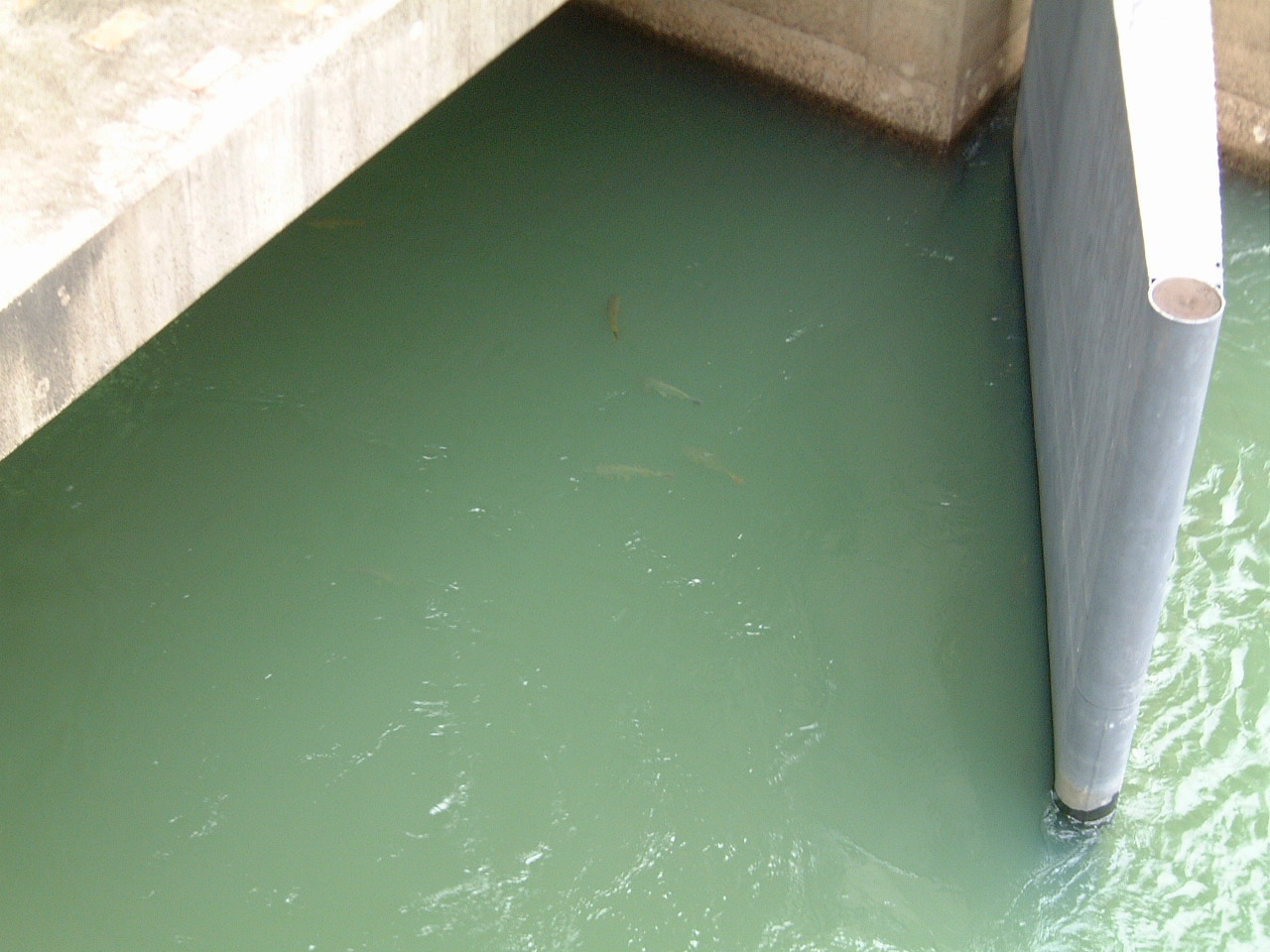
Flood gate for fish

The lake created by the dam displaced 40,000 people. The elevation of the water level also affected the road infrastructure and sewage of the region in a way that many studies undertaken prior to construction of the dam did not take into account; independent research later confirmed that the census of INDEC in 1990 was altered to reduce the amount of money the Yacyreta Organization would have to pay to compensate the people displaced.

Ecologically, the construction of the dam most greatly affected the environment of the region in three ways. Firstly, it altered aquatic habitats via the elevation of the water level and the flooding of previously dry areas, which produced chemical changes in the water, including a drop in water oxygen levels. Besides, the alteration of the streams of water affected the dynamics of the floating vegetation that in the system Iberá is the habitat of many endemic species. The more calm water behind the dam has also allowed the spread of waterborne diseases and disease vectors, such as schistosomiasis, dengue fever and malaria.

The structure and composition of the productive activities of the primary sector, that in addition to the direct flooding also modifies the level of humidity of thousand of hectares destined to agriculture and the exploit of wood, thousands of cattle were lost in the process of formation of the lake.

Destruction of the habitat submerged by the dam could cause great loss of biodiversity. Numerous protected species have been affected in one of the few spaces in which they survive in Paraguay and Argentina, including pampas deer, capybara, certain water birds and yacare caiman. The consequences for the fish population of Paraná have been very severe, causing a large drop in the volume of some species, especially when the dam was first constructed. Aquatic invertebrates also declined. For example, among four Aylacostoma aquatic snails restricted to the area, two became extinct, one extinct in the wild, and the final is seriously threatened. The construction of the system of elevators helped reduce this effect.

== Current state ==
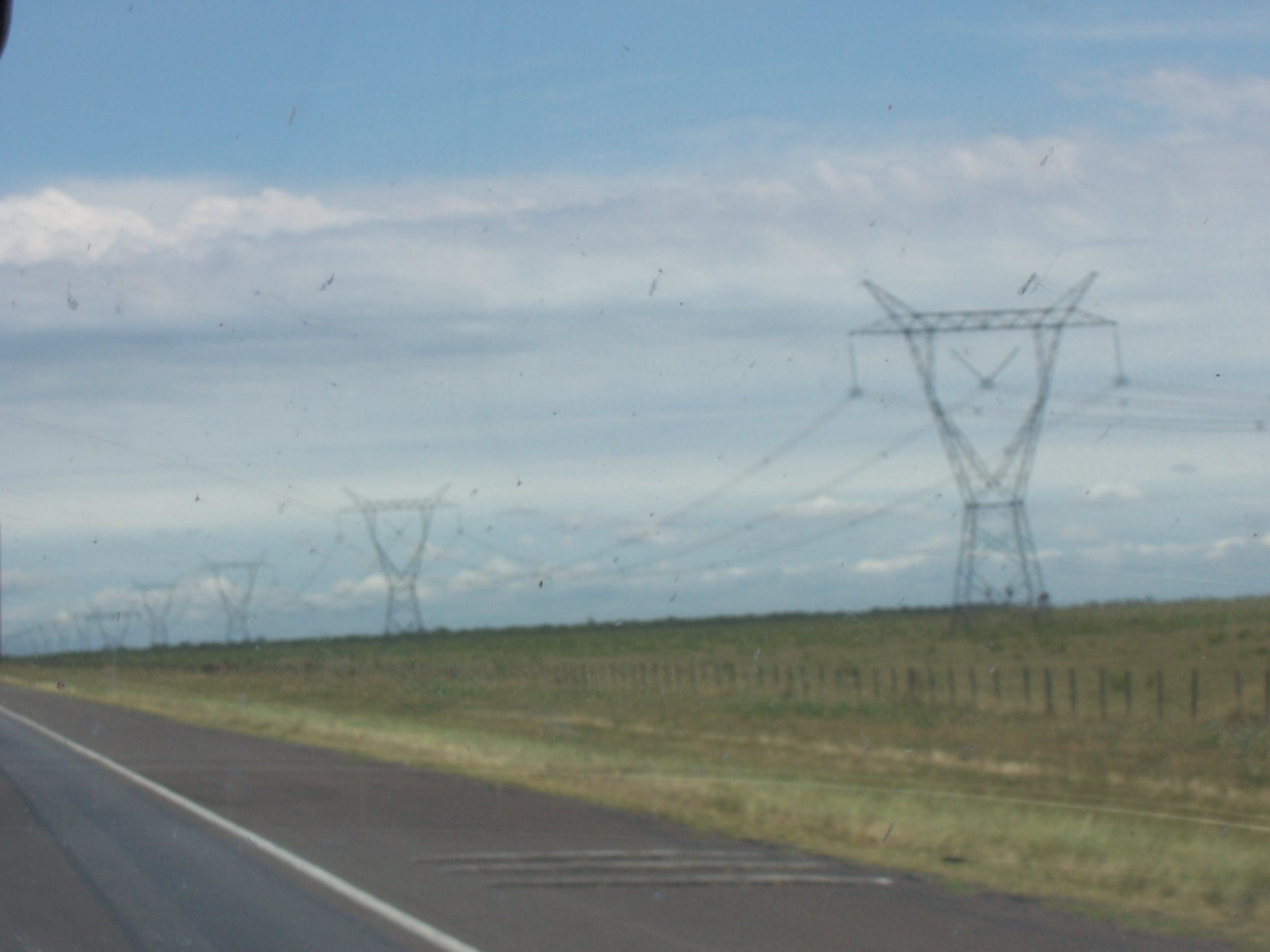
Transmission towers

Before February 2011, the water level was 76 metres (249 ft) above sea level, 7 metres (23 ft) less than planned. This caused the hydroelectric component of the dam to operate at only 60% of its capacity. The water level was raised, bringing it to 83 metres (272 ft) above sea level and covering another 1,650 square kilometres (640 sq mi) of land surface, affecting more than 50,000 people. This brought the installed capacity to its final design of 3,100 MW and the annual generation to about 20,000 GWh; a capacity factor of 74%.

The plan to finish the Yacyretá project included:

- Freeing the flooded areas, taking into consideration the expropriation of properties, the safety of the freed areas, the relocation of the population and the rehabilitation of the economy.
- Doing all the necessary work to reduce negative effects on the natural environment.
- Repairing the infrastructure, routes, bridges, ports, airports, electric supply lines, etc.
- Repairing the damage to the urban areas of Encarnación, Posadas and other cities.

Problems with the 500 kV transmission lines from the Yacyretá Dam caused a power outage on June 16, 2019, that lasted most of the day affecting 44 million residents of Argentina and others in Paraguay and Uruguay. Investigations were launched to determine the cause of the outage.

== Navigation ==
To ease navigation a ship lock was built in the locality of Santa María in the Argentine side. This has a length of 270 meters, and width of 27 meters and a depth of 5 meters, which allows the passage of 12-foot draft boats.

== Tourism ==
The area has an abundant fauna and there are areas for fishing. Fishing is regulated to protect and maintain fish populations, requiring fishing permits that can be obtained in the regional Office of Fishing.

- The Yacyreta Regional Museum is located in Ayolas. It exhibits archaeological objects, minerals and examples of specimens of the native fauna.
- The Animal Refuge of Atinguy is located 18 kilometres from Ayolas; its territory is roughly 100 hectares, where a great variety of flora and fauna of the region can be found.
- The refuge provides conditions for the animals to live in a natural environment.

Even though the hydroelectric power station produces a relatively low amount of contaminants, the Bi-National Organization has set aside areas for the preservation and recuperation of the local flora and fauna, trying to reduce the consequences of the construction. From flooding, 11,000 animals from 110 different species were relocated. Currently, the Organization has a protected area of about 58,000 hectares, with plans for an eventual increase to 187,000 hectares. There is a centre for visitors and a track of 2,500 meters called "Akuti po’i" that serves to take guided tours. There are several hotels to stay in when visiting the place, such as the Hotel Nacional de Turismo and the Jasyretâ Apart Hotel.

== See also ==
- List of power stations in Paraguay
- List of power stations in Argentina
