= Laudo Hayes Firm Day =

Annual provincial holiday in Paraguay

Laudo Hayes Firm Day is an annual provincial holiday in a department of Paraguay celebrated annually on November 12. It commemorates U.S. President Rutherford B. Hayes' intervention in an international border dispute between Paraguay and Argentina, arbitrated in favor of Paraguay. The area that became Presidente Hayes Department with its capital city of Villa Hayes was named for the U.S. president who awarded an area that comprises 60 percent of modern Paraguay to the country while arbitrating a boundary dispute between Paraguay and Argentina after the Paraguayan War, which Paraguay lost, and in which hundreds of thousands died, including more than half of Paraguay's population. The dispute over the remote "Chaco Boreal", the Gran Chaco region and Chaco (Paraguay) specifically was settled. The area is sparsely populated and includes many indigenous people. The compromise was reached after 8 years of negotiations on November 12, 1878.
