= Presidente Hayes Department =

Department of Paraguay

Presidente Hayes Departamento de Presidente Hayes (Spanish) Tetãvore Presidente Hayes (Guarani)
- Department
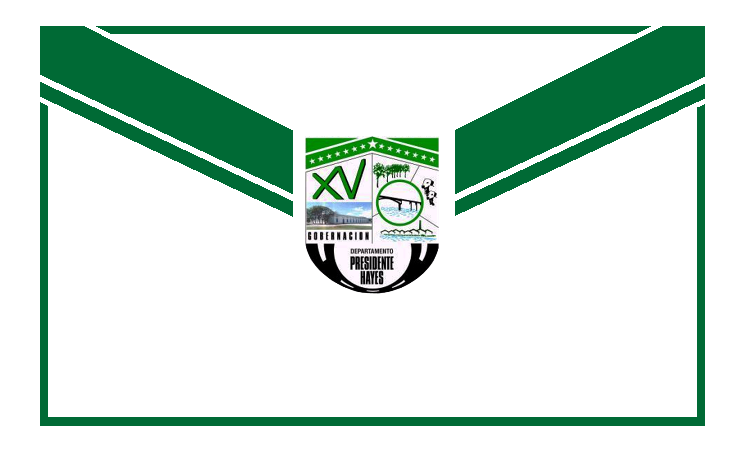
- Flag

- Coordinates: 23°46′S 58°37′W
- Country: Paraguay
- Capital: Villa Hayes

Government
  - Governor: Bernardo Zárate (ANR)

Area
  - Total: 72,907 km^{2} (28,150 sq mi)

Population (2022)
  - Total: 126,880
  - Density: 1.7403/km^{2} (4.5074/sq mi)
- Time zone: UTC-03 (PYT)
- ISO 3166 code: PY-15
- Number of Districts: 8

Presidente Hayes (Spanish pronunciation: [pɾesiˈðente ˈaʝes]) is a department in Paraguay. The capital is the city of Villa Hayes. The department was named after U.S. President Rutherford B. Hayes, who awarded the territory to Paraguay while arbitrating a boundary dispute between Paraguay and Argentina after the Paraguayan War.

== Districts ==
The department is divided into eight districts:

1. Benjamín Aceval
2. Campo Aceval
3. General Bruguez
4. José Falcón
5. Nanawa (Puerto Elsa)
6. Nueva Asunción (Chaco’í)
7. Puerto Pinasco
8. Teniente Esteban Martínez
9. Teniente Primero Manuel Irala Fernández
10. Villa Hayes

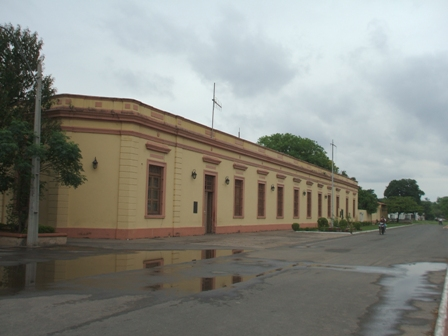
Government of Presidente Hayes near the Paraguay river

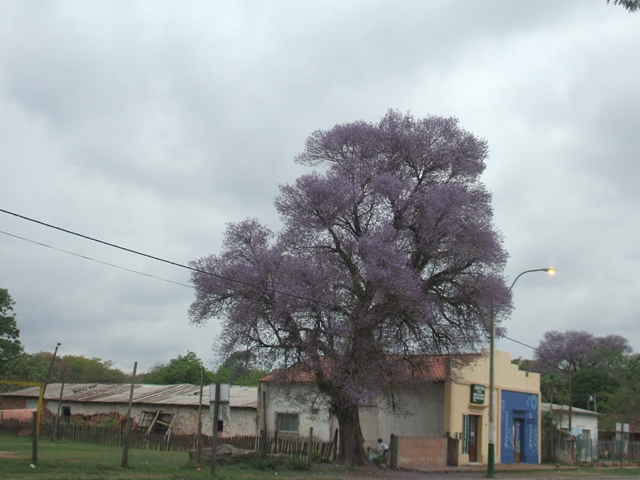
A street of Benjamín Aceval

== History ==
In the colonial period, conflicts between settlers and native tribes resulted in the abandonment of towns and missions including Melodía, Timbó, Naranjajay, and Remolinos.

Only Fort Borbon, today called Fort Olimpo, survived. Founded during the government of Joaquín Alós y Brú, the garrison contained the southern advance of the Portuguese.

French settlers tried but failed to settle the area, with the exception of Villa Occidental.

After the Paraguayan War of 1864–1870, U.S. President Rutherford B. Hayes arbitrated a boundary dispute between Argentina and Paraguay and ultimately awarded the territory to Paraguay in 1878. In gratitude, Paraguay renamed the department as "Presidente Hayes".

In 1906, during the political division of Paraguay, the department was divided into two regions, Oriental and Occidental. The latter was divided in military headquarters that depended on the War and Marine Ministry.

Important dates for this department include June 12 (Chaco Peace Day), September 29 (Boquerón Victory Day) and November 12 (Laudo Hayes Firm Day).

Pozo Colorado was named the capital in 1988. However, the capital was changed to Villa Hayes in 1999.

== Environment ==
In 2023 and 2024, in the Western Region, most of the fires occurred in the Presidente Hayes Department. Reported on the 1st of October 2020, when within 24 hours, there were more than 12,000 fires raging in Paraguay, the Presidente Hayes Department was the department with the highest number of fires in Paraguay, with 8,617 different fires recorded in the last 24 hours, with the city of Villa Hayes concentrating most of them with 6,105 hotspots in the same time period.

== Geography ==
=== Borders ===
Located between parallels 22° 03′ and 25° 20′ of South latitude and the meridians 57° 15′ and 61° 00′ of longitude West.

- To the North: Alto Paraguay department, from which is separated by the road of the railway from "km 160" to "km 20", from this point by an imaginary straight line until Paraguay River.
- To the South: Formosa Province, Argentina, from which is separated by the Pilcomayo River, all the way from its flow into the Paraguay River to the San Lorenzo Mission.
- To the East: the departments Concepción, San Pedro, Cordillera and Central; Presidente Hayes is separated from them by the Paraguay River, from its flow into the La Paz River until the Pilcomayo River.
- To the West: Boquerón department, separated by the road that connects the San Lorenzo Mission with the Forts Gral. Díaz, Avalos Sánchez, Zenteno, Dr. Gaspar Rodríguez de Francia, Boquerón, Isla Poí and Casanillo, and from this point with an imaginary straight line until "km 160".

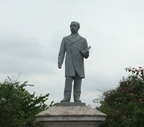
Monumento de Benjamín Aceval

=== Climate ===
The temperature reaches 44 °C (111 °F) in summer and drops to 0 °C (32 °F) in winter. The average temperature is 26 °C (79 °F). The average amount of precipitation is between 900 and 1,200 millimetres (35 and 47 in) annually.

=== Hydrography ===
The Paraguay River forms one border of the department. The tributary rivers Pilcomayo, San Carlos, Siete Puntas, Negro, Verde, Montelindo, Aguaray Guazú, and Confuso also flow through the department but are not navigable for big ships. To the south lies the Patiño Swamp.

The city of Villa Hayes floods frequently when the rivers overflow. The land elsewhere in the department is higher.

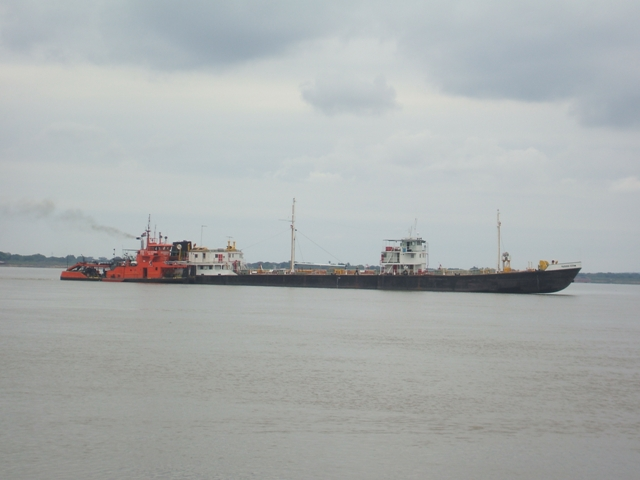
View from Villa Hayes of a ship sailing on the Paraguay River

=== Environment ===
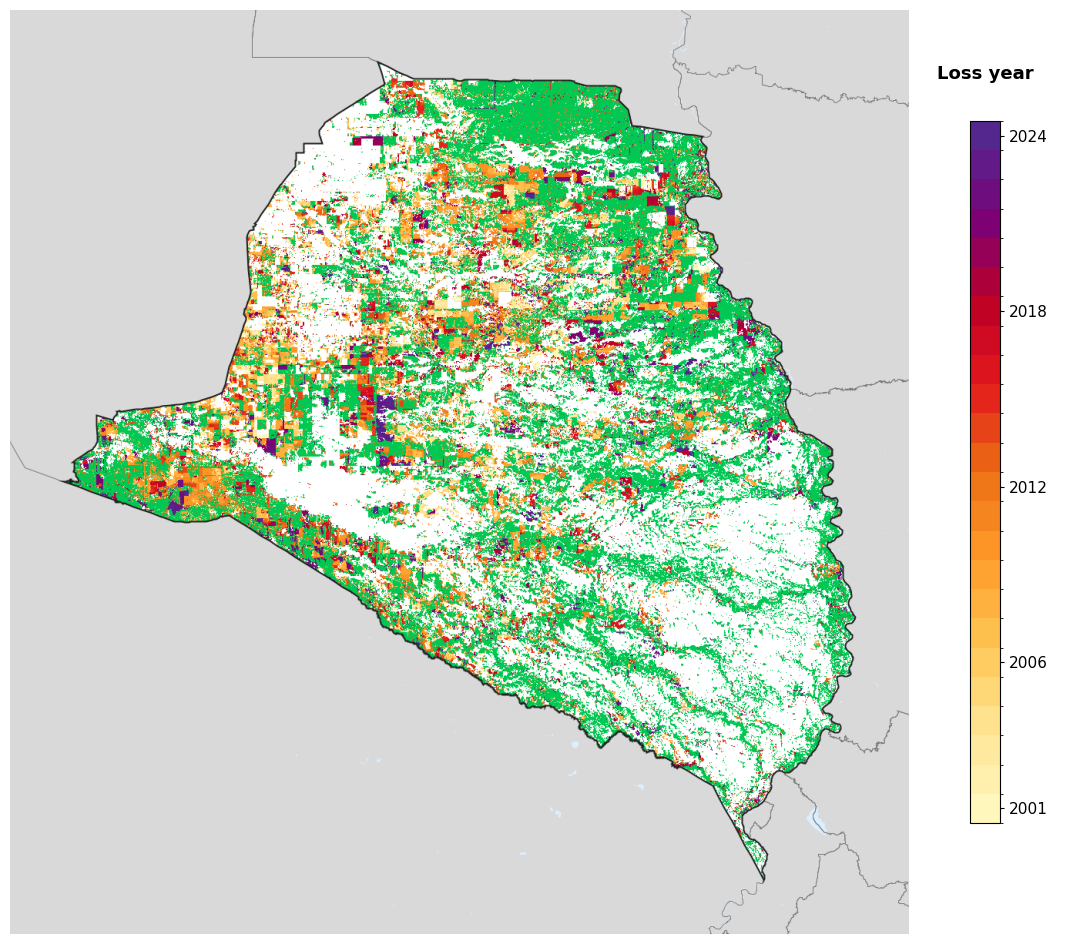
Tree-cover loss year in Presidente Hayes, 2001-2024, from the Global Forest Change dataset.

There are four ecosystems in the Chaco territory: the floodplain of the Paraguay River, Pozo Azul, Laguna Salada, and the Floodplain of the Pilcomayo River.

The Pilcomayo River's deviation towards Argentina has produced several changes in the habits of the people; the drought causes the migration of the jacarés to most humid areas and spreads diseases.

Endangered flora include timbó, samu'u, white and red quebracho, and karanday and endangered fauna include carpincho, jurumi, jacaré, and tapir.

The east has saline soil and the south has calcareous soil. The hills Confuso, Siete Cabezas and Galván are small elevations.

== Economy ==
=== Industry and business ===
Presidente Hayes leads Paraguay in production of cattle, and is second in production of horses.

The population is heavily involved in agriculture; the department is third place in production of sorghum. Cotton and sugarcane are also agricultural products of the area; Villa Hayes and Benjamín Aceval are notable for production of sugarcane.

The sugar factory Censi and Pirota is located in Villa Hayes. Sawmills, ceramic factories and steel mills are also in the city. ACEPAR, Aceros del Paraguay, is an important iron and steel industry and is also located in Villa Hayes.

In addition, in Villa Hayes is Astillero Chaco Paraguayo S.A., a specialising in the construction of launches for heavy loads, fuel and vegetable oil transportation. There is also soap and lime factories and an ESSO plant of fuel and lubricants.

Puerto Falcón trades heavily with Argentina and also sees a lot of tourism. Tinfunqué National Park is a major tourist attraction with an area of 280,000 hectares.

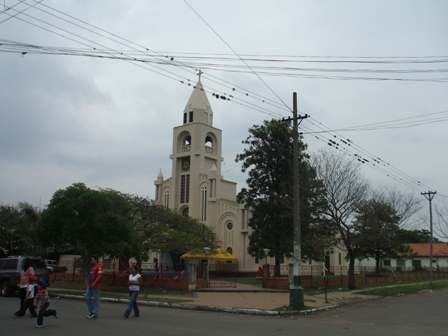
The church of Villa Hayes

=== Transportation and services ===
The most important way of transportation is Route No. 9 "Carlos Antonio López" also known as "Transchaco", which cross the Paraguay River through the Remanso Bridge and extends to Bolivia.

The Route No. 12 "Vice Presidente Sánchez" borders Pilcomayo River, but is not passable when raining.

The road Pozo Colorado-Puerto Milirar reaches Concepción, crossing the Paraguay River through a bridge.

The different roads that connect portions of the department have the inconvenience of being impassable during the rainy season.

Paraguay River is the most used way to communicate with Puerto Pinasco.

In Puerto Falcón, is possible the communication with the Argentine city Clorinda through the San Ignacio de Loyola International Bridge.

The cattle establishments use aerial ways.

There are two FM radio stations, Radio Villa Hayes and Dyon. About 3,200 people have phone service.

There are 16,865 households in the department, 6,165 in the urban area, and 10,700 in the rural area. The percentage of which count with basic facilities are the following:

- Electric power: 39.9%
- Running water: 19.1%
- Trash collection: 4.3%

=== Health and education ===
The region has 96 institutions of elementary education, 192 of basic education and 29 of high school education.

There are 38 hospitals and health care centers.

== Flag ==
The flag of Presidente Hayes Department.

The flag of the state is a simple green and white triband. Originally, the department's flag was a white flag with a green border and two diagonal stripes from the top-right and top-left corners touching a coat of arms design, but at some point it was replaced with the current one.

== See also ==
- Deforestation in Paraguay
