= Enso Villamayor =

Paraguayan footballer (born 1995)

Personal information
- Full name: Enso Rodrigo Villamayor
- Date of birth: 2 October 1995 (age 31)
- Place of birth: Emboscada, Paraguay
- Height: 1.81 m (5 ft 11 in)
- Position: Forward

Team information
- Current team: 3 de Febrero

Youth career
- Cerro Corá

Senior career*
Years	Team	Apps	(Gls)
2016–2019	Sportivo Luqueño	21	(6)
2017	→ Independiente (loan)	7	(0)
2018	→ Resistencia (loan)		
2018	→ All Boys (loan)	4	(0)
2019–	3 de Febrero	0	(0)
- * Club domestic league appearances and goals as of 14:16, 11 April 2019 (UTC)

Enso Rodrigo Villamayor (born 2 October 1995) is a Paraguayan professional footballer who plays as a forward for 3 de Febrero.

== Career ==
Villamayor had a youth spell with Cerro Corá. He began his senior career with Sportivo Luqueño. He made his professional bow in the Primera División versus Nacional on 12 March 2016, which preceded his first goals coming a week later as he netted a brace in a 2–2 draw at home to Deportivo Capiatá. Further goals came against General Díaz, River Plate, Nacional and General Caballero as the club finished eighth to qualify for the Copa Sudamericana. After just two total appearances for them in 2017, Villamayor left on loan in June 2017 to Independiente. A total of seven appearances followed with the Asunción team.

In August 2018, months after a stint with Resistencia in the División Intermedia, Villamayor switched Paraguay for Argentina after agreeing a move to All Boys of Primera B Metropolitana. His debut came in a 1–0 win over Talleres in October, with three more matches following. Villamayor left All Boys at the end of 2018, subsequently securing a contract back in his homeland with 3 de Febrero on 3 March 2019.

== Career statistics ==
As of 11 April 2019.

Appearances and goals by club, season and competition
Club	Season	League			Cup		Continental		Other		Total	
Club	Season	Division	Apps	Goals	Apps	Goals	Apps	Goals	Apps	Goals	Apps	Goals
Sportivo Luqueño	2016	Primera División	18	6	—		3 (Note: Appearance(s) in the Copa Sudamericana)	0	0	0	21	6
Sportivo Luqueño	2017	Primera División	1	0	—		1	0	0	0	2	0
Sportivo Luqueño	2018	Primera División	2	0	—		0	0	0	0	2	0
Sportivo Luqueño	Total		21	6	—		4	0	0	0	25	6
Independiente (loan)	2017	Primera División	7	0	—		—		0	0	7	0
All Boys (loan)	2018–19	Primera B Metropolitana	4	0	0	0	—		0	0	4	0
3 de Febrero	2019	Primera División	0	0	0	0	—		0	0	0	0
Career total			32	6	0	0	4	0	0	0	36	6
