= Rutherford B. Hayes =

President of the United States from 1877 to 1881

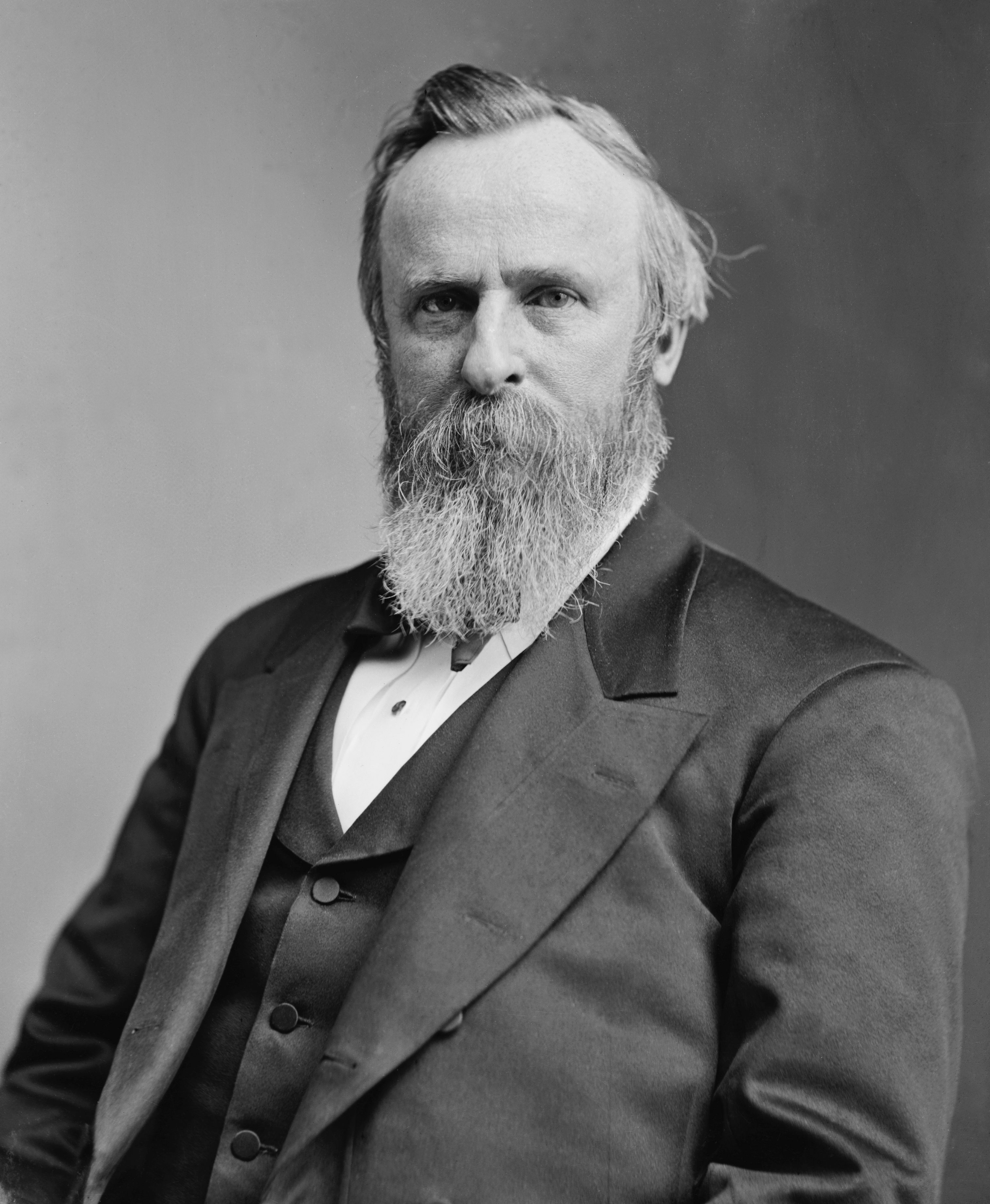
- Portrait, c. 1870–1880

19th President of the United States
- In office March 4, 1877 – March 4, 1881
- Vice President: William A. Wheeler
- Preceded by: Ulysses S. Grant
- Succeeded by: James A. Garfield

29th & 32nd Governor of Ohio
- In office January 10, 1876 – March 2, 1877
- Lieutenant: Thomas L. Young
- Preceded by: William Allen
- Succeeded by: Thomas L. Young
- In office January 12, 1868 – January 8, 1872
- Lieutenant: John Calvin Lee
- Preceded by: Jacob Dolson Cox
- Succeeded by: Edward Follansbee Noyes

Member of the U.S. House of Representatives from Ohio's 2nd district
- In office March 4, 1865 – July 20, 1867
- Preceded by: Alexander Long
- Succeeded by: Samuel Fenton Cary

Personal details
- Born: Rutherford Birchard Hayes; October 4, 1822 Delaware, Ohio, U.S.
- Died: January 17, 1893 (aged 70) Spiegel Grove, Ohio, U.S.
- Resting place: Spiegel Grove
- Party: Whig (until 1854); Republican (from 1854)
- Spouse: Lucy Ware Webb (m. 1852; died 1889)
- Children: 8, including Webb and Rutherford
- Relatives: John Humphrey Noyes (first cousin) and Carl Edwards (great-great-great grandson)
- Education: Kenyon College (BA); Harvard University (LLB)
- Occupation: Politician; lawyer

Military service
- Branch/service: Union army; United States Volunteers
- Years of service: 1861–1865
- Rank: Brigadier general; Major general (brevet)
- Regiments: 23rd Ohio Infantry
- Commands: Kanawha Division
- Battles/wars: See list: American Civil War; Battle of Carnifex Ferry; Battle of Giles Court House; Battle of South Mountain (WIA); Battle of Buffington Island; Battle of Cloyd's Mountain; Battle of Lynchburg; Second Battle of Kernstown; Third Battle of Winchester; Battle of Fisher's Hill; Battle of Cedar Creek

Rutherford Birchard Hayes (/ˈrʌðərfərd/; October 4, 1822 – January 17, 1893) was the 19th president of the United States, serving from 1877 to 1881. He served as Cincinnati's city solicitor from 1858 to 1861 and was known as a staunch abolitionist who defended refugee slaves in court proceedings. At the start of the Civil War, Hayes left a fledgling political career to join the Union army. He was wounded five times, most seriously at the Battle of South Mountain in 1862. Hayes earned a reputation for bravery in combat, rising in the ranks to serve as brevet major general. After the war, he was a prominent member of the "Half-Breed" faction of the Republican Party. Hayes served in Congress from 1865 to 1867 and was elected governor of Ohio, serving two consecutive terms from 1868 to 1872 and half of a third two-year term from 1876 to 1877 before his swearing-in as president.

Hayes won the Republican nomination in the 1876 United States presidential election. Upon election, Hayes pledged to serve only one term. In the disputed general election, he defeated Democratic nominee Samuel J. Tilden while losing the popular vote. Neither candidate initially secured enough electoral votes to win, but Hayes prevailed after a Congressional Commission awarded him 20 contested electoral votes in the alleged Compromise of 1877. The electoral dispute was reportedly settled in an agreement between Southern Democrats and Whiggish Republican businessmen whereby Hayes would be president but end both federal support for Reconstruction and the military occupation of the former Confederacy, though the existence of such a deal remains heavily disputed.

Hayes's administration was influenced by his belief in meritocratic government and equal treatment without regard to wealth, social standing, or race. One of the defining events of his presidency was the Great Railroad Strike of 1877, which Hayes resolved by calling in the U.S. Army against the railroad workers. It remains the deadliest conflict between workers and strikebreakers in American history.

As president, Hayes implemented modest civil service reforms that laid the groundwork for further reform in the 1880s and 1890s. He vetoed the Bland–Allison Act of 1878, which put silver money into circulation and raised nominal prices, but Congress overrode his veto. Hayes also arbitrated a territorial dispute between Argentina and Paraguay after the Paraguayan War and appointed John Marshall Harlan to the U.S. Supreme Court. His policy toward western Native Americans anticipated the assimilationist program of the Dawes Act of 1887. At the end of his term, Hayes kept his pledge not to run for reelection and retired to his home in Ohio. Historians and scholars generally rank Hayes as a below-average to average president.

== Early life and family ==
=== Childhood and family history ===
Rutherford Birchard Hayes was born in Delaware, Ohio, on October 4, 1822, to Rutherford Ezekiel Hayes, Jr. and Sophia Birchard. His father, a Vermont storekeeper, had taken the family to Ohio in 1817. He died 10 weeks before Rutherford's birth. Sophia raised Hayes and his sister, Fanny, the only two of four children to survive to adulthood. She never remarried, and Sophia's younger brother, Sardis Birchard, lived with the family for a time. He was always close to Hayes and became a father figure to him, contributing to his early education.

Through each of his parents, Hayes was descended from New England colonists. His earliest immigrant ancestor came to Connecticut from Scotland. Hayes's great-grandfather Ezekiel Hayes was a militia captain in Connecticut in the American Revolutionary War, but Ezekiel's son (Hayes's grandfather, also named Rutherford) left his Branford home during the war for the relative peace of Vermont. His mother's ancestors migrated to Vermont at a similar time. Hayes wrote:

I have always thought of myself as Scotch, but of the fathers of my family who came to America about thirty were English and two only, Hayes and Rutherford, were of Scotch descent. This is on my father's side. On my mother's side, the whole thirty-two were probably all of other peoples besides the Scotch.

John Noyes, an uncle by marriage, had been his father's business partner in Vermont and was later elected to Congress. His first cousin, Mary Jane Mead, was the mother of sculptor Larkin Goldsmith Mead and architect William Rutherford Mead. John Humphrey Noyes, the founder of the Oneida Community, was also a first cousin.

=== Education and early law career ===
Hayes attended the common schools in Delaware, Ohio, and enrolled in 1836 at the Norwalk Seminary in Norwalk, Ohio. He did well at Norwalk, and the next year transferred to the Webb School, a preparatory school in Middletown, Connecticut, where he studied Latin and Ancient Greek. Returning to Ohio, Hayes attended Kenyon College in Gambier in 1838. He enjoyed his time at Kenyon and was successful scholastically; while there, Hayes joined several student societies and became interested in Whig politics. His classmates included Stanley Matthews and John Celivergos Zachos. Hayes graduated Phi Beta Kappa with the highest honors in 1842 and addressed the class as its valedictorian.

After briefly reading law in Columbus, Ohio, Hayes moved east to attend Harvard Law School in 1843. Graduating with an LL.B, he was admitted to the Ohio bar in 1845 and opened his own law office in Lower Sandusky (now Fremont). Business was slow at first, but Hayes gradually attracted clients and also represented his uncle Sardis in real estate litigation. In 1847, Hayes became ill with what his doctor thought was tuberculosis. Thinking a change in climate would help, he considered enlisting in the Mexican–American War, but on his doctor's advice, Hayes visited family in New England instead. Returning from there, Hayes and his uncle Sardis made a long journey to Texas, where Hayes visited Guy M. Bryan, a Kenyon classmate and distant relative. Business remained meager on his return to Lower Sandusky, and Hayes decided to move to Cincinnati.

=== Cincinnati law practice and marriage ===
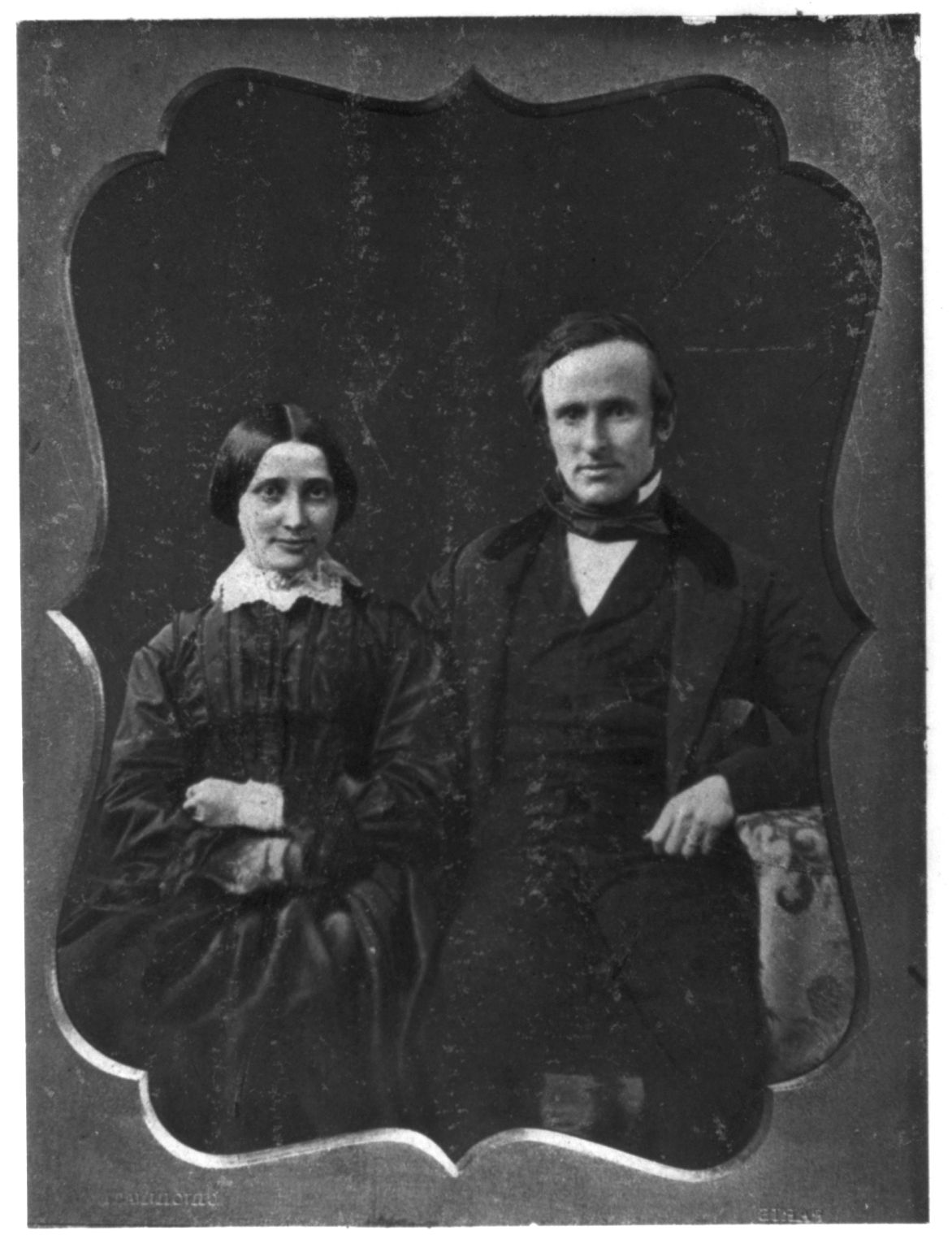
Rutherford and Lucy Hayes on their wedding day

In 1850, Hayes moved to Cincinnati and opened a law office with John W. Herron, a lawyer from Chillicothe. (Note: Herron's daughter, Helen, later married William Howard Taft.) Herron later joined a more established firm and Hayes formed a new partnership with William K. Rogers and Richard M. Corwine. He found business better in Cincinnati and enjoyed its social attractions, joining the Cincinnati Literary Society and the Odd Fellows Club. Hayes also attended the Episcopal Church in Cincinnati but did not become a member.

Hayes courted his future wife, Lucy Webb, during his time there. His mother had encouraged him to get to know Lucy years earlier, but Hayes had believed that she was too young and focused his attention on other women. Four years later, Hayes began to spend more time with Lucy. They became engaged in 1851 and married on December 30, 1852, at Lucy's mother's house. Over the next five years, Lucy gave birth to three sons: Birchard Austin (1853), Webb Cook (1856), and Rutherford Platt (1858). A Methodist, Lucy was a teetotaler and abolitionist. She influenced her husband's views on those issues, though Hayes never formally joined her church.

Hayes had begun his law practice dealing primarily with commercial issues but won greater prominence in Cincinnati as a criminal defense attorney, defending several people accused of murder. In one case, he used a form of the insanity defense that saved the accused from the gallows; she was instead confined to a mental institution. Hayes also defended slaves who had escaped and been accused under the Fugitive Slave Act of 1850. Because Cincinnati was just across the Ohio River from Kentucky, a slave state, it was a destination for escaping slaves, and many such cases were tried in its courts. A staunch abolitionist, Hayes found his work on behalf of fugitive slaves personally gratifying as well as politically useful, as it raised his profile in the newly formed Republican Party.

Hayes's political reputation rose with his professional plaudits. He declined a Republican nomination for a judgeship in 1856. Two years later, some Republicans proposed that Hayes fill a vacancy on the bench, and he considered accepting the appointment until the office of city solicitor also became vacant. The city council elected Hayes city solicitor to fill the vacancy, and he was elected to a full two-year term in April 1859 by a larger majority than other Republicans on the ticket.

== Civil War ==
=== West Virginia and South Mountain ===
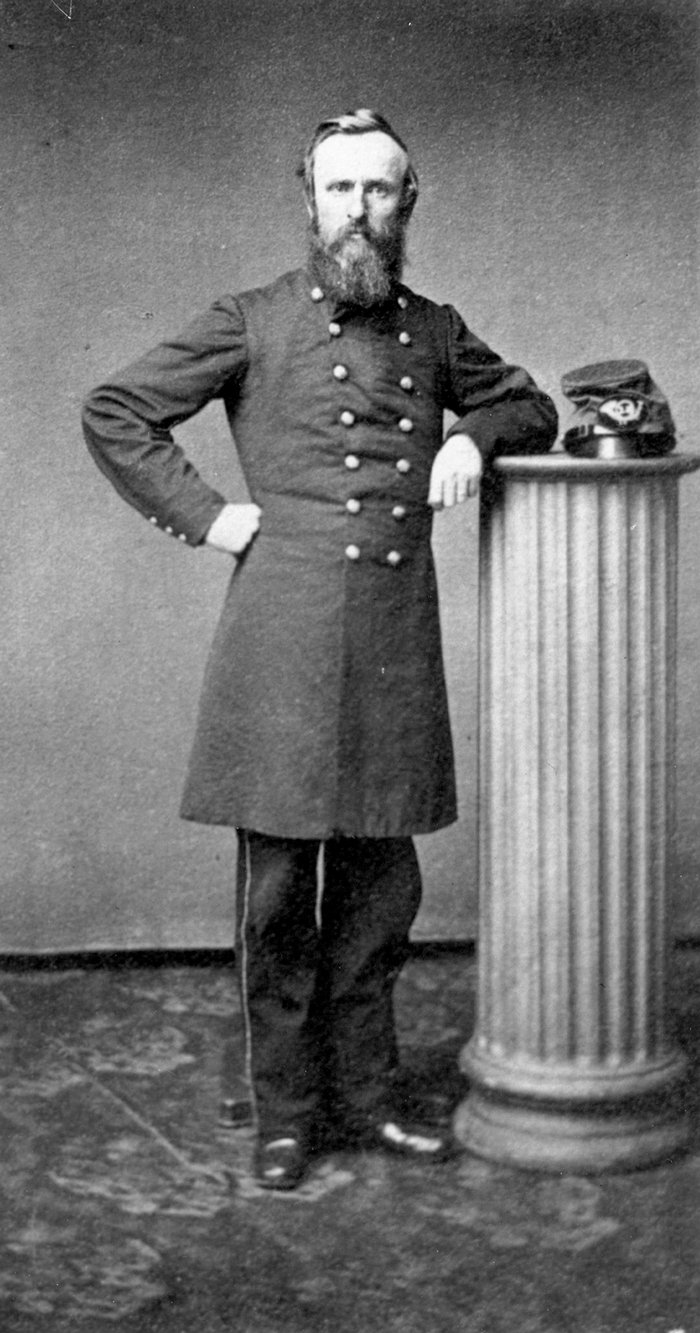
Hayes in Civil War uniform in 1861

As the Southern states quickly began to secede after Lincoln's election to the presidency in 1860, Hayes was lukewarm about civil war to restore the Union. Considering that the two sides might be irreconcilable, he suggested that the Union "[l]et them go." Ohio had voted for Lincoln in 1860, but Cincinnati voters turned against the Republican Party after secession. Its residents included many from the Southern United States, and they voted for the Democrats and Know-Nothings, who combined to sweep the city elections in April 1861, ejecting Hayes from the city solicitor's office.

Returning to private practice, Hayes formed a very brief law partnership with Leopold Markbreit, lasting three days before the war began. After the Confederates fired on Fort Sumter, Hayes resolved his doubts and joined a volunteer company composed of his Literary Society friends. That June, Governor William Dennison appointed several of the officers of the volunteer company to positions in the 23rd Regiment of Ohio Volunteer Infantry. Hayes was promoted to major, and his friend and college classmate Stanley Matthews was appointed lieutenant colonel. Also joining the regiment as a private was another future president, William McKinley.

After a month of training, Hayes and the 23rd Ohio set out for western Virginia in July 1861 as a part of the Kanawha Division. They did not meet the enemy until September, when the regiment encountered Confederates at Carnifex Ferry in present-day West Virginia and drove them back. In November, Hayes was promoted to lieutenant colonel (Matthews having been promoted to colonel of another regiment) and led his troops deeper into western Virginia, where they entered winter quarters. The division resumed its advance the following spring, and Hayes led several raids against the rebel forces, on one of which he sustained a minor injury to his knee. That September, Hayes's regiment was called east to reinforce General John Pope's Army of Virginia at the Second Battle of Bull Run. Hayes and his troops did not arrive in time for the battle, but joined the Army of the Potomac as it hurried north to cut off Robert E. Lee's Army of Northern Virginia, which was advancing into Maryland. Marching north, the 23rd was the lead regiment encountering the Confederates at the Battle of South Mountain on September 14. Hayes led a charge against an entrenched position and was shot through his left arm, fracturing the bone. Hayes had one of his men tie a handkerchief above the wound in an effort to stop the bleeding, and continued to lead his men in the battle. While resting, Hayes ordered his men to meet a flanking attack, but instead his entire command moved backward, leaving Hayes lying in between the lines.

Eventually, his men brought Hayes back behind their lines, and he was taken to hospital. The regiment continued on to Antietam, but Hayes was out of action for the rest of the campaign. In October, he was promoted to colonel and assigned to command of the first brigade of the Kanawha Division as a brevet brigadier general.

=== Army of the Shenandoah ===
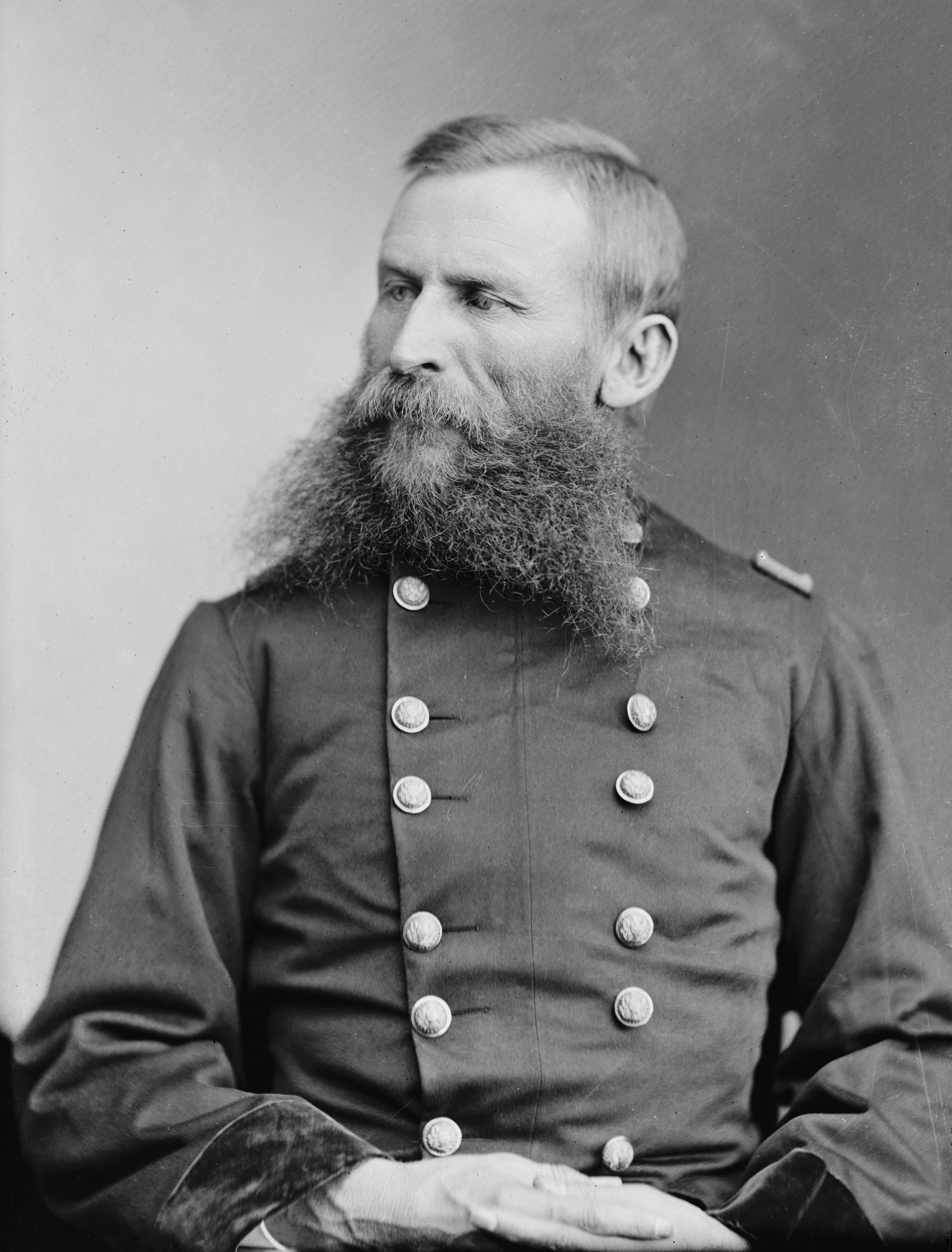
George Crook was Hayes's commander and the namesake of his fourth son

The division spent the following winter and spring near Charleston, Virginia (present-day West Virginia), out of contact with the enemy. Hayes saw little action until July 1863, when the division skirmished with John Hunt Morgan's cavalry at the Battle of Buffington Island. Returning to Charleston for the rest of the summer, Hayes spent the fall encouraging the men of the 23rd Ohio to reenlist, and many did. In 1864, the Army command structure in West Virginia was reorganized, and Hayes's division was assigned to George Crook's Army of West Virginia. Advancing into southwestern Virginia, they destroyed Confederate salt and lead mines there. On May 9, they engaged Confederate troops at Cloyd's Mountain, where Hayes and his men charged the enemy entrenchments and drove the rebels from the field. Following the rout, the Union forces destroyed Confederate supplies and again successfully skirmished with the enemy.

Hayes and his brigade moved to the Shenandoah Valley for the Valley Campaigns of 1864. Crook's corps was attached to Major General David Hunter's Army of the Shenandoah and soon back in contact with Confederate forces, capturing Lexington, Virginia, on June 11. They continued south toward Lynchburg, tearing up railroad track as they advanced, but Hunter believed the troops at Lynchburg were too powerful, and Hayes and his brigade returned to West Virginia. Hayes thought Hunter lacked aggression, writing in a letter home that "General Crook would have taken Lynchburg." Before the army could make another attempt, Confederate General Jubal Early's raid into Maryland forced their recall to the north. Early's army surprised them at Kernstown on July 24, where Hayes was slightly wounded by a bullet to the shoulder. He also had a horse shot out from under him, and the army was defeated. Retreating to Maryland, the army was reorganized again, with Major General Philip Sheridan replacing Hunter. By August, Early was retreating up the valley, with Sheridan in pursuit. Hayes's troops fended off a Confederate assault at Berryville and advanced to Opequon Creek, where they broke the enemy lines and pursued them farther south. They followed up the victory with another at Fisher's Hill on September 22, and one more at Cedar Creek on October 19. At Cedar Creek, Hayes sprained his ankle after being thrown from a horse and was struck in the head by a spent round, which did not cause serious damage. His leadership and bravery drew his superiors' attention, with Ulysses S. Grant later writing of Hayes, "[h]is conduct on the field was marked by conspicuous gallantry as well as the display of qualities of a higher order than that of mere personal daring."

Cedar Creek marked the end of the campaign. Hayes was promoted to brigadier general in October 1864 and brevetted major general. Around this time, he learned of the birth of his fourth son, George Crook Hayes. The army went into winter quarters once more, and in spring 1865 the war quickly came to a close with Lee's surrender to Grant at Appomattox. Hayes visited Washington, D.C., that May and observed the Grand Review of the Armies, after which he and the 23rd Ohio returned to their home state to be mustered out of the service.

== Post-war politics ==
=== U.S. Representative from Ohio ===
While serving in the Army of the Shenandoah in 1864, Hayes was nominated by Republicans for the House of Representatives from Ohio's 2nd congressional district. Asked by friends in Cincinnati to leave the army to campaign, he refused, saying that an "officer fit for duty who at this crisis would abandon his post to electioneer for a seat in Congress ought to be scalped." Instead, Hayes wrote several letters to the voters explaining his political positions and was elected by a 2,400-vote majority over the incumbent, Democrat Alexander Long.

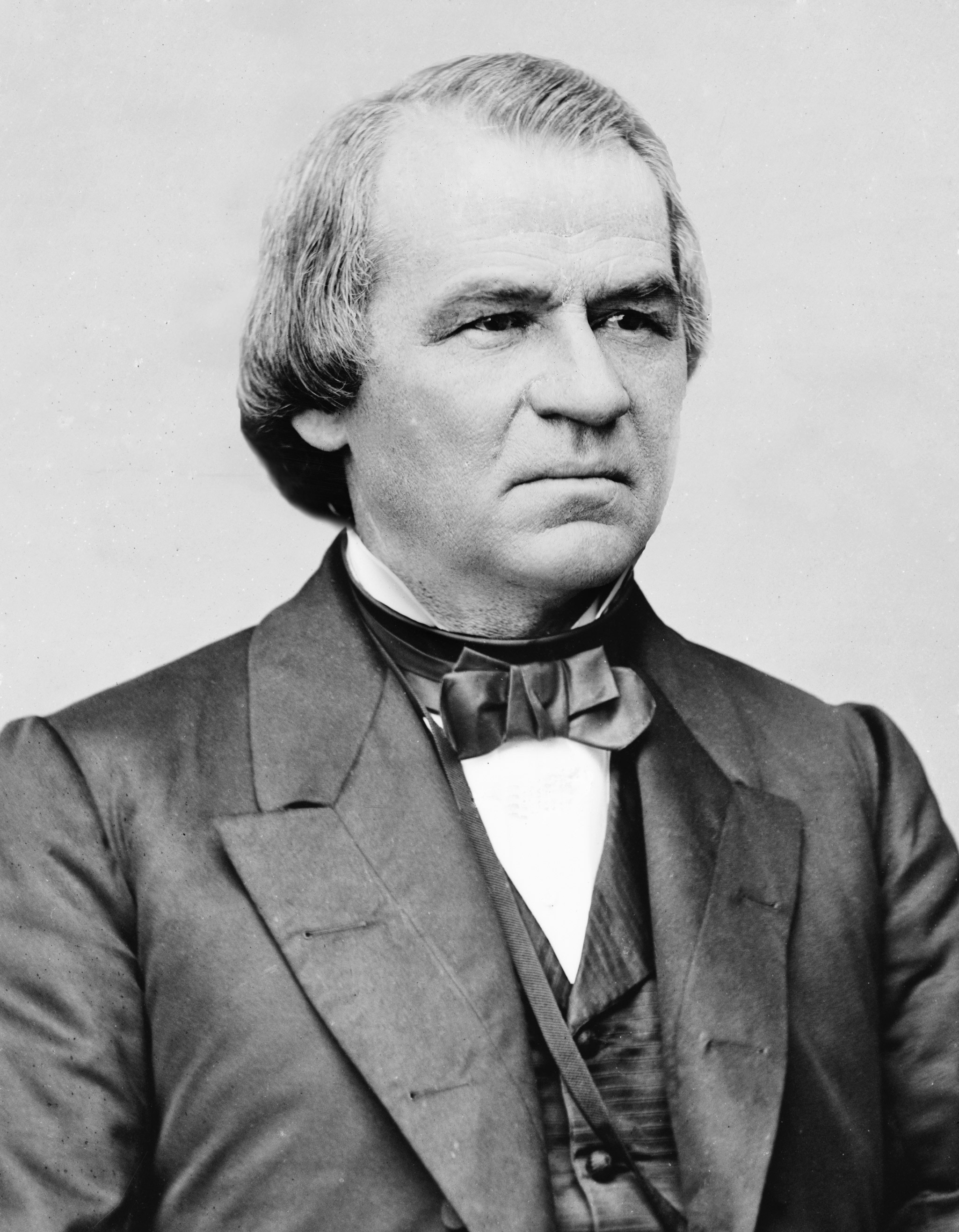
Democratic President Andrew Johnson and Radical Republicans fought over Reconstruction.

When the 39th Congress assembled in December 1865, Hayes was sworn in as a part of a large Republican majority. Hayes identified with the party's moderate wing, but was willing to vote with the radicals for the sake of party unity. The major legislative effort of the Congress was the Fourteenth Amendment to the United States Constitution, for which Hayes voted and which passed both houses of Congress in June 1866. Hayes's beliefs were in line with his fellow Republicans on Reconstruction issues: that the South should be restored to the Union, but not without adequate protections for freedmen and other black southerners. President Andrew Johnson, who succeeded to office following Lincoln's assassination, to the contrary wanted to readmit the seceded states quickly without first ensuring that they adopted laws protecting the newly freed slaves' civil rights; he also granted pardons to many of the leading former Confederates. Hayes, along with congressional Republicans, disagreed. They worked to reject Johnson's vision of Reconstruction and to pass the Civil Rights Act of 1866.

Reelected in 1866, Hayes returned to the lame-duck session. On January 7, 1867, he voted for the resolution that authorized the first impeachment inquiry against Andrew Johnson. Hayes also voted during this time for the Tenure of Office Act, which ensured that Johnson could not remove administration officials without the Senate's consent, and unsuccessfully pressed for a civil service reform bill that attracted the votes of many reform-minded Republicans. Hayes continued to vote with the majority in the 40th Congress on the Reconstruction Acts, but resigned in July 1867 to run for governor of Ohio.

=== Governor of Ohio ===
A popular Congressman and former Army officer, Hayes was considered by Ohio Republicans to be an excellent standard-bearer for the 1867 election campaign. His political views were more moderate than the Republican party's platform, although Hayes agreed with the proposed amendment to the Ohio state constitution that would guarantee suffrage to black male Ohioans. His opponent, Allen G. Thurman, made the proposed amendment the centerpiece of the campaign and opposed black suffrage. Both men campaigned vigorously, making speeches across the state, mostly focusing on the suffrage question. The election was mostly a disappointment to Republicans, as the amendment failed to pass and Democrats gained a majority in the state legislature. Hayes thought at first that he, too, had lost, but the final tally showed that Hayes had won the election by 2,983 votes of 484,603 votes cast.

As a Republican governor with a Democratic legislature, Hayes had a limited role in governing, especially since Ohio's governor had no veto power. Despite these constraints, he oversaw the establishment of a school for deaf-mutes and a reform school for girls. Hayes endorsed the impeachment of President Andrew Johnson and urged his conviction, which failed by one vote in the United States Senate. Nominated for a second term in 1869, Hayes campaigned again for equal rights for black Ohioans and sought to associate his Democratic opponent, George H. Pendleton, with disunion and Confederate sympathies. Hayes was reelected with an increased majority, and the Republicans took the legislature, ensuring Ohio's ratification of the Fifteenth Amendment to the United States Constitution, which guaranteed black (male) suffrage. With a Republican legislature, Hayes's second term was more enjoyable. Suffrage was expanded and a state Agricultural and Mechanical College (later to become Ohio State University) was established. He also proposed a reduction in state taxes and reform of the state prison system. Choosing not to seek reelection, Hayes looked forward to retiring from politics in 1872.

=== Private life and return to politics ===
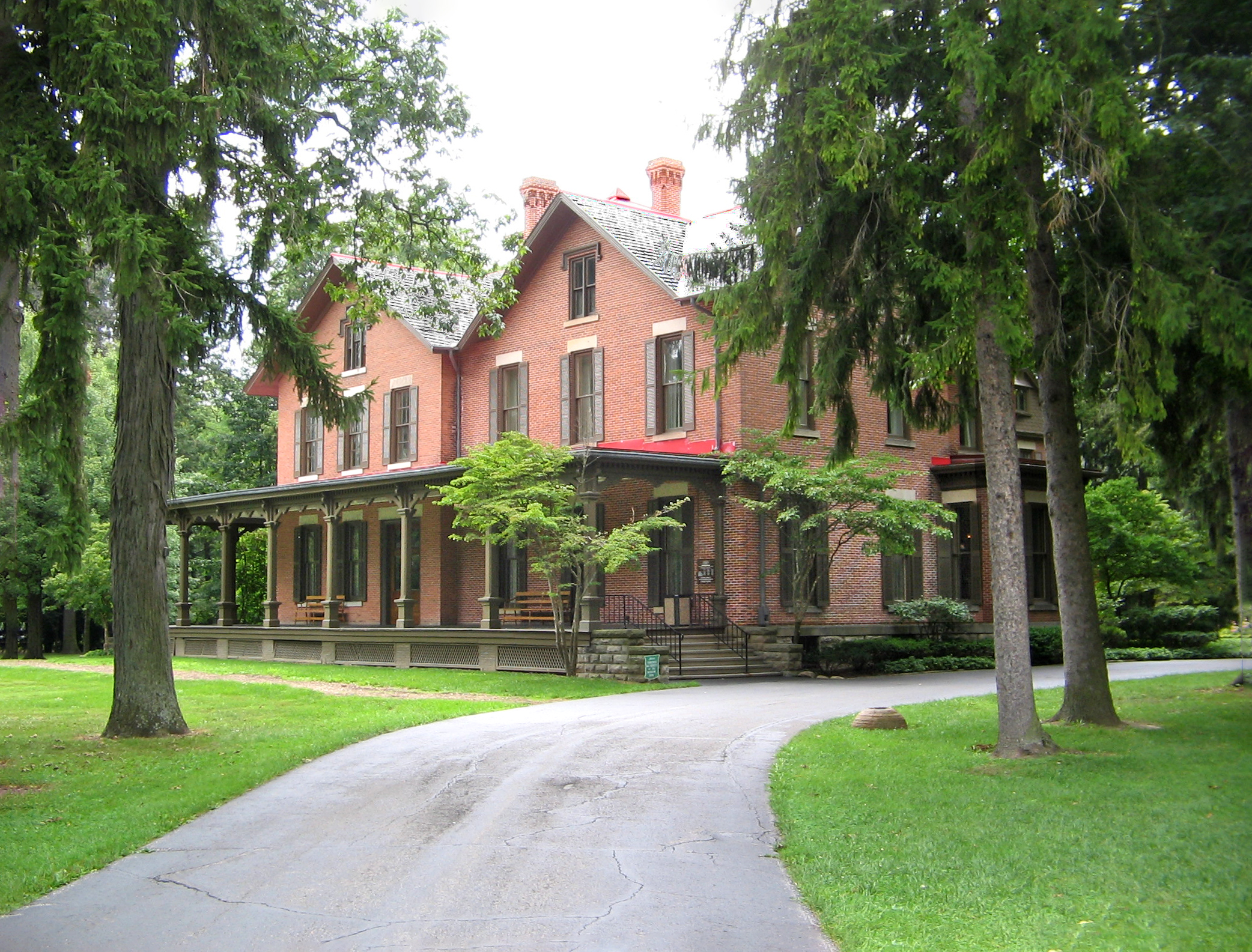
Hayes's home, Spiegel Grove, in Fremont, Ohio

As Hayes prepared to leave office, several delegations of reform-minded Republicans urged him to run for United States Senate against the incumbent Republican, John Sherman. Hayes declined, preferring to preserve party unity and retire to private life. He especially looked forward to spending time with his children, two of whom (daughter Fanny and son Scott) had been born in the past five years. (Note: His first two sons, Joseph and George, had died in infancy.) Initially, Hayes tried to promote railway extensions to his hometown, Fremont. Hayes also managed some real estate he had acquired in Duluth, Minnesota. Not entirely removed from politics, Hayes held out some hope of a cabinet appointment, but was disappointed to receive only an appointment as assistant U.S. treasurer at Cincinnati, which he turned down. Hayes agreed to be nominated for his old House seat in 1872, but was disappointed when he lost the election to Henry B. Banning, a fellow Kenyon College alumnus.

In 1873, Lucy gave birth to another son, Manning Force Hayes. (Note: He was named after Hayes's friend, Manning Force.) That same year, the Panic of 1873 hurt business prospects across the nation, including Hayes's. His uncle Sardis Birchard died that year, and the Hayes family moved into Spiegel Grove, the grand house Birchard had built with them in mind. That year, Hayes announced his uncle's bequest of $50,000 in assets to endow a public library for Fremont, to be called the Birchard Library. It opened in 1874 on Front Street, and a new building was completed and opened in 1878 in Fort Stephenson State Park, as per the terms of the bequest. Hayes served as chairman of the library's board of trustees until his death.

Hayes hoped to stay out of politics in order to pay off the debts he had incurred during the Panic, but when the Republican state convention nominated him for governor in 1875, he accepted. His campaign against Democratic nominee William Allen focused primarily on Protestant fears about the possibility of state aid to Catholic schools. Hayes was against such funding and, while not known to be personally anti-Catholic, he allowed anti-Catholic fervor to contribute to the enthusiasm for his candidacy. The campaign was a success, and on October 12, 1875, Hayes was returned to the governorship by a 5,544-vote majority. The first person to earn a third term as governor of Ohio, Hayes reduced the state debt, reestablished the Board of Charities, and repealed the Geghan Bill, which had allowed for the appointment of Catholic priests to schools and penitentiaries.

== Election of 1876 ==
=== Republican nomination and campaign against Tilden ===
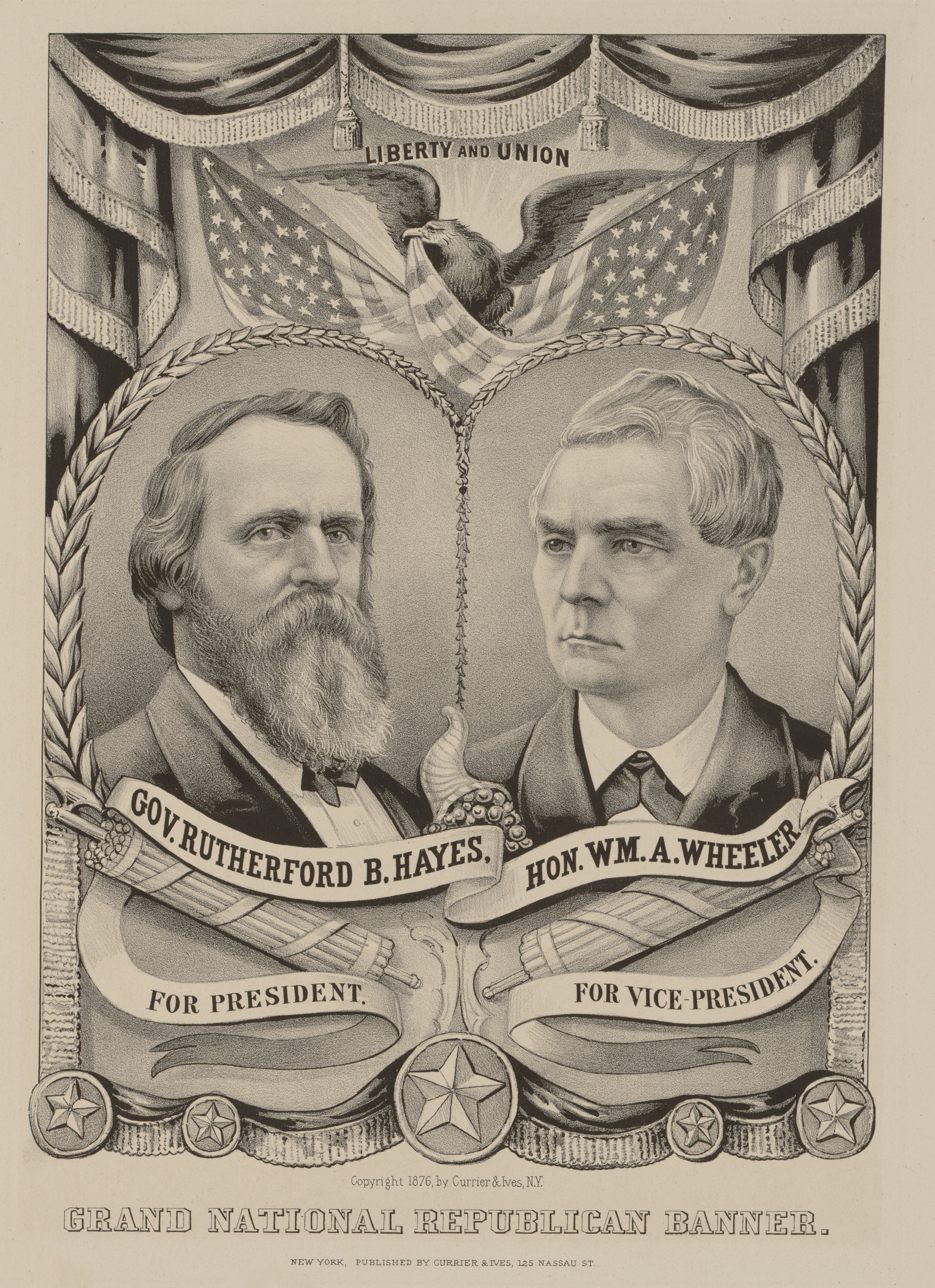
Original Currier & Ives campaign poster depicting the Hayes-Wheeler ticket, the last and rarest in the firm's "Grand National Banner" series

Hayes's success in Ohio immediately elevated him to the top ranks of Republican politicians under consideration for the presidency in 1876. The Ohio delegation to the 1876 Republican National Convention was united behind him, and Senator John Sherman did all in his power to get Hayes the nomination. In June 1876, the convention assembled with James G. Blaine of Maine as the favorite. Blaine started with a significant lead in the delegate count, but could not muster a majority. As he failed to gain votes, the delegates looked elsewhere for a nominee and settled on Hayes on the seventh ballot. The convention selected Representative William A. Wheeler from New York for vice president, a man about whom Hayes had recently asked, "I am ashamed to say: who is Wheeler?"

Hayes and Wheeler emphasized conciliatory appeals to the Southern Whiggish element, attempting to "detach" old Southern Whigs from Southern Democrats. The Democratic nominee was New York governor Samuel J. Tilden. Tilden was considered a formidable adversary who, like Hayes, had a reputation for honesty. Also like Hayes, Tilden was a hard-money man and supported civil service reform. As was the custom at the time, the campaign was conducted by surrogates, with Hayes and Tilden remaining in their respective hometowns. The poor economic conditions made the party in power unpopular and Hayes suspected he would lose the election.

Both candidates concentrated on the swing states of New York and Indiana, as well as the three southern states—Louisiana, South Carolina, and Florida—where Reconstruction Republican governments still barely ruled, amid recurring political violence, including widespread efforts to suppress freedman voting. The Republicans emphasized the danger of letting Democrats run the nation so soon after Southern Democrats had provoked the Civil War and, to a lesser extent, the danger a Democratic administration would pose to the recently won civil rights of southern blacks. Democrats, for their part, trumpeted Tilden's record of reform and contrasted it with the corruption of the incumbent Grant administration.

As the returns were tallied on election day, it was clear that the race was close: Democrats had carried most of the South, as well as New York, Indiana, Connecticut, and New Jersey. In the Northeastern United States, an increasing number of immigrants and their descendants voted Democratic. Although Tilden won the popular vote and claimed 184 electoral votes, Republican leaders challenged the results and charged Democrats with fraud and voter suppression of blacks (who would otherwise have voted Republican) in Florida, Louisiana, and South Carolina. Republicans realized that if they held the three disputed unredeemed southern states together with some of the western states, they would emerge with an electoral college majority.

=== Disputed electoral votes ===
On November 11, three days after election day, Tilden appeared to have won 184 electoral votes, one short of a majority. Hayes appeared to have 166, with the 19 votes of Florida, Louisiana, and South Carolina still in doubt. Republicans and Democrats each claimed victory in the three latter states, but the results in those states were rendered uncertain because of fraud by both parties. To further complicate matters, one of the three electors from Oregon (a state Hayes had won) was disqualified, reducing Hayes's total to 165, and raising the disputed votes to 20. (Note: The elector, John W. Watts, was disqualified because he held "an Office of Trust or Profit under the United States", in violation of Article II, section 1, clause 2 of the U.S. Constitution.) If Hayes was not awarded all 20 disputed votes, Tilden would be elected president.

Results of the 1876 election, with states won by Hayes in red, and those won by Tilden in blue

There was considerable debate about which person or house of Congress was authorized to decide between the competing slates of electors, with the Republican Senate and the Democratic House each claiming priority. By January 1877, with the question still unresolved, Congress and President Grant agreed to submit the matter to a bipartisan Electoral Commission, which would be authorized to determine the fate of the disputed electoral votes. The commission was to be made up of five representatives, five senators, and five Supreme Court justices. To ensure partisan balance, there would be seven Democrats and seven Republicans, with Justice David Davis, an independent respected by both parties, as the 15th member. The balance was upset when Democrats in the Illinois legislature elected Davis to the Senate, hoping to sway his vote. Davis disappointed Democrats by refusing to serve on the Commission because of his election to the Senate. As all the remaining Justices were Republicans, Justice Joseph P. Bradley, believed to be the most independent-minded of them, was selected to take Davis's place on the commission. The Commission met in February and the eight Republicans voted to award all 20 electoral votes to Hayes. Democrats, outraged by the result, attempted a filibuster to prevent Congress from accepting the commission's findings. Eventually, the filibusterers gave up, allowing the House and Senate to reassemble to complete the count of the electoral votes, and at 4:10 a.m. on March 2, Senator Thomas W. Ferry announced that Hayes and Wheeler had been elected to the presidency and vice presidency by an electoral margin of 185–184.

The events that resolved the dispute remain heavily contested among historians. C. Vann Woodward's version of events are the following: As inauguration day neared, Republican and Democratic Congressional leaders met at Wormley's Hotel in Washington to negotiate a compromise. Republicans promised concessions in exchange for Democratic acquiescence to the committee's decision. The main concession Hayes promised was the withdrawal of federal troops from the South and an acceptance of the election of Democratic governments in the remaining "unredeemed" southern states. The Democrats agreed, and on March 2, the filibuster was ended. Regardless of the existence of such a deal, Hayes was elected, but Reconstruction was finished, and freedmen were left at the mercy of white Democrats who did not intend to preserve their rights.

== Presidency (1877–1881) ==
=== Inauguration ===
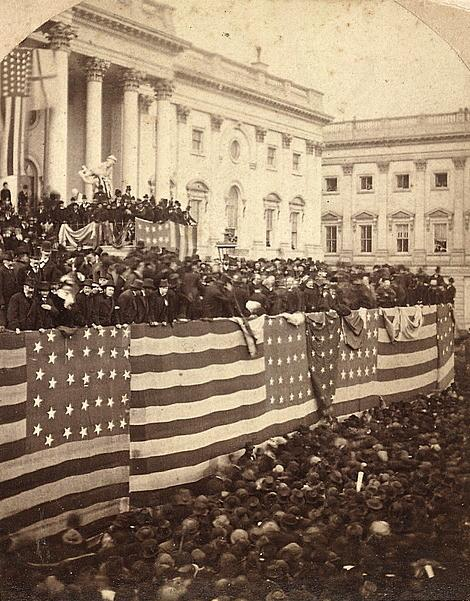
Chief Justice Morrison R. Waite administering the oath of office to Hayes

Because March 4, 1877, was a Sunday, Hayes took the oath of office privately on Saturday, March 3, in the Red Room of the White House, the first president to do so in the Executive Mansion. Two days later, he took the oath publicly on the East Portico of the United States Capitol. In his inaugural address, Hayes attempted to soothe the passions of the past few months, saying that "he serves his party best who serves his country best". Hayes pledged to support "wise, honest, and peaceful local self-government" in the South, as well as reform of the civil service and a full return to the gold standard. Despite his message of conciliation, many Democrats never considered Hayes's election legitimate and referred to him as "Rutherfraud" or "His Fraudulency" for the next four years.

=== The South and the end of Reconstruction ===
Hayes had firmly supported Republican Reconstruction policies throughout his career, but the first major act of his presidency was an end to Reconstruction and the return of the South to "home rule". Even without the conditions of the Wormley's Hotel agreement, Hayes would have been hard-pressed to continue his predecessors' policies. The House of Representatives in the 45th Congress was controlled by a majority of Democrats, and they refused to appropriate enough funds for the army to continue to garrison the South. Even among Republicans, devotion to continued military Reconstruction was fading in the face of persistent Southern insurgency and violence. Only two states, South Carolina and Louisiana, were still under Reconstruction's sway when Hayes assumed the presidency on March 5. On April 3, Hayes ordered Secretary of War George W. McCrary to withdraw federal troops stationed at the South Carolina State House to their barracks. A few weeks later on April 20, he ordered McCrary to send the federal troops stationed at New Orleans's St. Louis Hotel to Jackson Barracks.

At the time of the 1876 election, only three states, Florida, South Carolina, and Louisiana, still had Republican governments. In Florida, the Democrats won the governor's election and controlled the state house, leaving South Carolina and Louisiana as the only states where Republican regimes were still supported by federal troops. Without troops to enforce the voting rights laws, these soon fell to Democratic control.

Hayes's later attempts to protect the rights of southern blacks were ineffective, as were his attempts to rebuild Republican strength in the South. But he did defeat Congress's efforts to curtail federal power to monitor federal elections. Democrats in Congress passed an army appropriation bill in 1879 with a rider that would have repealed the Enforcement Acts, which had been used to suppress the Ku Klux Klan. Chapters had flourished across the South and it had been one of the insurgent groups that attacked and suppressed freedmen. Those Acts, passed during Reconstruction, made it a crime to prevent someone from voting because of his race. But other paramilitary groups, such as the Red Shirts in the Carolinas, had intimidated freedmen and suppressed the vote. Hayes was determined to preserve the law protecting black voters and vetoed the appropriation.

The Democrats did not have enough votes to override the veto, but they passed a new bill with the same rider. Hayes vetoed that bill too, and the process was repeated thrice more. Finally, Congress passed a bill without the offensive rider, but refused to pass another bill to fund federal marshals, who were vital to the enforcement of the Enforcement Acts. The election laws remained in effect, but the funds to enforce them were curtailed for the time being.

Hayes tried to reconcile the social mores of the South with the recently passed civil rights laws by distributing patronage among southern Democrats. "My task was to wipe out the color line, to abolish sectionalism, to end the war and bring peace," he wrote in his diary. "To do this, I was ready to resort to unusual measures and to risk my own standing and reputation within my party and the country." All his efforts were in vain; Hayes failed to persuade the South to accept legal racial equality or to convince Congress to appropriate funds to enforce the civil rights laws.

=== Civil service reform ===
Hayes took office determined to reform the system of civil service appointments, which had been based on the spoils system since Andrew Jackson's presidency. (Note: Hayes's predecessor, President Ulysses S. Grant, appointed the first Civil Service Commission in 1871, but it dissolved in 1874.) Instead of giving federal jobs to political supporters, Hayes wished to award them by merit according to an examination that all applicants would take. His call for reform immediately brought him into conflict with the Stalwart, or pro-spoils, branch of the Republican party. Senators of both parties were accustomed to being consulted about political appointments and turned against Hayes. Foremost among his enemies was New York Senator Roscoe Conkling, who fought Hayes's reform efforts at every turn.

To show his commitment to reform, Hayes appointed one of the best-known advocates of reform at the time, Carl Schurz, to be Secretary of the Interior and asked Schurz and Secretary of State William M. Evarts to lead a special cabinet committee charged with drawing up new rules for federal appointments. Treasury Secretary John Sherman ordered John Jay to investigate the New York Custom House, which was stacked with Conkling's spoilsmen. Jay's report suggested that the New York Custom House was so overstaffed with political appointees that 20% of the employees were expendable.

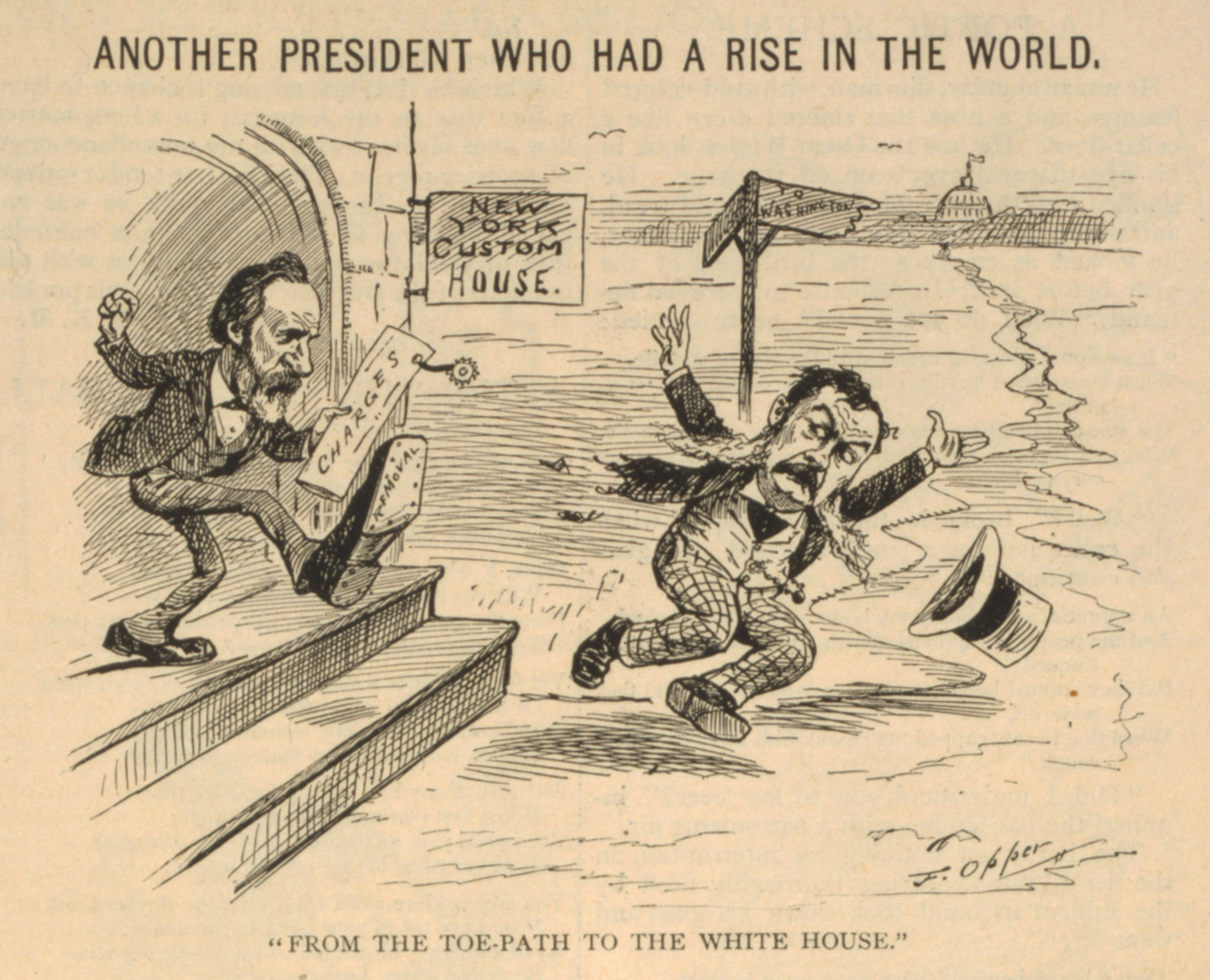
A cartoon of Hayes kicking Chester A. Arthur out of the New York Custom House

Although he could not convince Congress to prohibit the spoils system, Hayes issued an executive order that forbade federal office holders from being required to make campaign contributions or otherwise taking part in party politics. Chester A. Arthur, the Collector of the Port of New York, and his subordinates Alonzo B. Cornell and George H. Sharpe, all Conkling supporters, refused to obey the order. In September 1877, Hayes demanded their resignations, which they refused to give. He submitted appointments of Theodore Roosevelt, Sr., L. Bradford Prince, and Edwin Merritt—all supporters of Evarts, Conkling's New York rival—to the Senate for confirmation as their replacements. The Senate's Commerce Committee, chaired by Conkling, voted unanimously to reject the nominees. The full Senate rejected Roosevelt and Prince by a vote of 31–25, and confirmed Merritt only because Sharpe's term had expired.

Hayes was forced to wait until July 1878, when he fired Arthur and Cornell during a Congressional recess and replaced them with recess appointments of Merritt and Silas W. Burt, respectively. (Note: Charles K. Graham filled Merritt's former position.) Conkling opposed confirmation of the appointees when the Senate reconvened in February 1879, but Merritt was approved by a vote of 31–25 and Burt by 31–19, giving Hayes his most significant civil service reform victory.

For the remainder of his term, Hayes pressed Congress to enact permanent reform legislation and fund the United States Civil Service Commission, even using his last annual message to Congress in 1880 to appeal for reform. Reform legislation did not pass during Hayes's presidency, but his advocacy provided "a significant precedent as well as the political impetus for the Pendleton Act of 1883," which was signed into law by President Chester Arthur. Hayes allowed some exceptions to the ban on assessments, permitting George Congdon Gorham, secretary of the Republican Congressional Committee, to solicit campaign contributions from federal officeholders during the Congressional elections of 1878. In 1880, Hayes quickly forced Secretary of the Navy Richard W. Thompson to resign after Thompson accepted a $25,000 (~$714,967 in 2025) salary for a nominal job offered by French engineer Ferdinand de Lesseps to promote a French canal in Panama.

Hayes also dealt with corruption in the postal service. In 1880, Schurz and Senator John A. Logan asked Hayes to shut down the "star route" rings, a system of corrupt contract profiteering in the Postal Service, and to fire Second Assistant Postmaster-General Thomas J. Brady, the alleged ringleader. Hayes stopped granting new star route contracts but let existing contracts continue to be enforced. Democrats accused him of delaying proper investigation so as not to damage Republicans' chances in the 1880 elections but did not press the issue in their campaign literature, as members of both parties were implicated in the corruption. Historian Hans L. Trefousse later wrote that Hayes "hardly knew the chief suspect [Brady] and certainly had no connection with the [star route] corruption." Although Hayes and the Congress both investigated the contracts and found no compelling evidence of wrongdoing, Brady and others were indicted for conspiracy in 1882. After two trials, the defendants were acquitted in 1883.

=== Great Railroad Strike ===
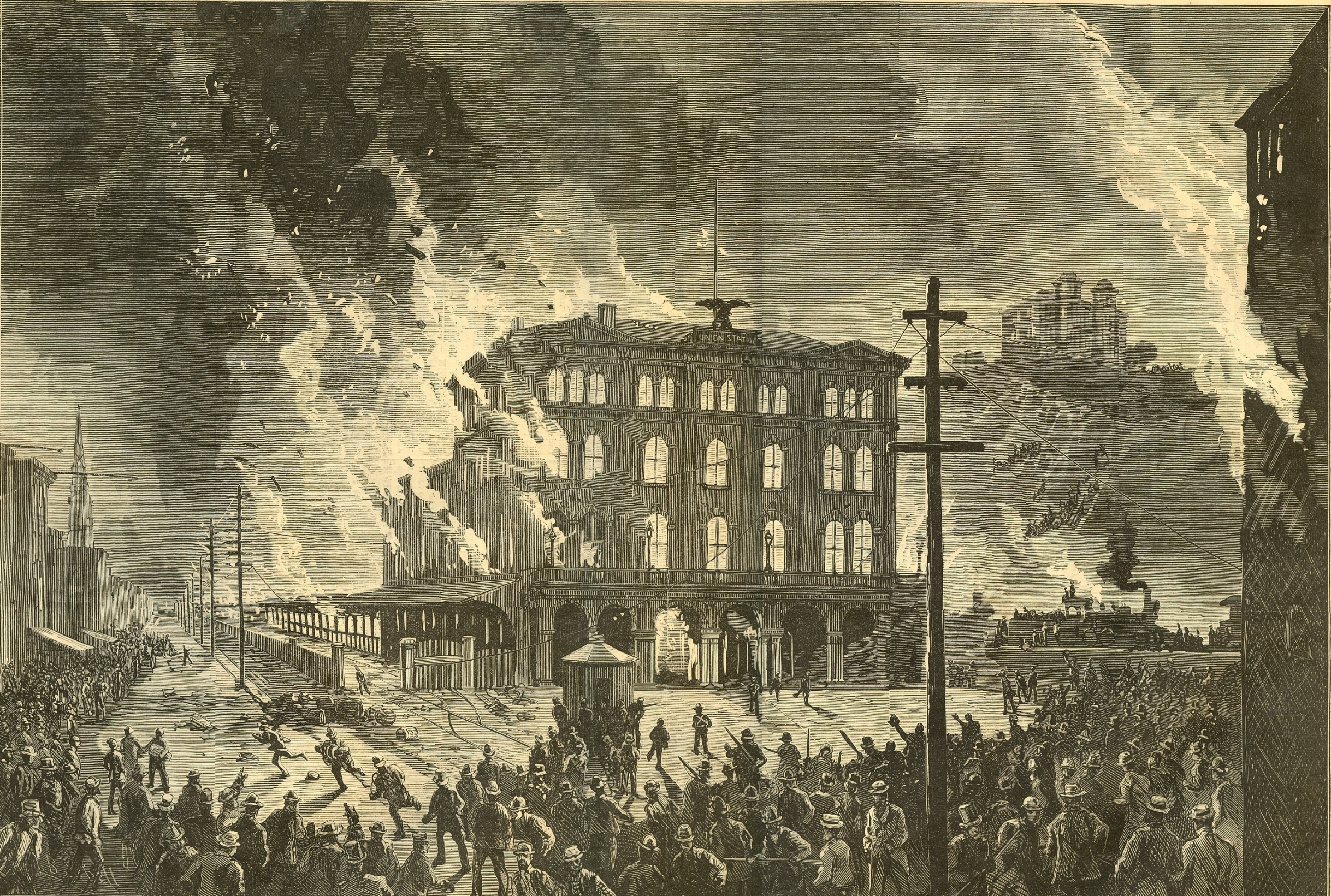
Burning of Union Depot, Pittsburgh, Pennsylvania, July 21–22, 1877

In his first year in office, Hayes was faced with the United States' largest labor uprising to date, the Great Railroad Strike of 1877. To make up for financial losses suffered since the panic of 1873, the major railroads had cut their employees' wages several times in 1877. In July of that year, workers at the Baltimore & Ohio Railroad walked off the job in Martinsburg, West Virginia, to protest their reduction in pay. The strike quickly spread to workers of the New York Central, Erie, and Pennsylvania railroads, with the strikers soon numbering in the thousands. Fearing a riot, Governor Henry M. Mathews asked Hayes to send federal troops to Martinsburg. Hayes did so, but when the troops arrived there was no riot—only a peaceful protest. A riot did erupt in Baltimore on July 20, and Hayes ordered the troops at Fort McHenry to assist the governor in suppressing it.

Pittsburgh exploded into riots next, but Hayes was reluctant to send in troops without the governor's request. Other discontented citizens joined the railroad workers in rioting. After a few days, Hayes resolved to send in troops to protect federal property wherever it appeared to be threatened and gave Major General Winfield Scott Hancock overall command of the situation, marking the first use of federal troops to break a strike against a private company. The riots spread further, to Chicago and St. Louis, where strikers shut down railroad facilities.

By July 29, the riots had ended and federal troops returned to their barracks. No federal troops had killed any of the strikers, or been killed themselves, but clashes between state militia troops and strikers resulted in deaths on both sides. The railroads were victorious in the short term, as the workers returned to their jobs and some wage cuts remained in effect. But the public blamed the railroads for the strikes and violence, and they were compelled to improve working conditions and make no further cuts. Business leaders praised Hayes, but his own opinion was more equivocal; as he recorded in his diary:

"The strikes have been put down by force; but now for the real remedy. Can't something [be] done by education of strikers, by judicious control of capitalists, by wise general policy to end or diminish the evil? The railroad strikers, as a rule, are good men, sober, intelligent, and industrious."

=== Currency debate ===
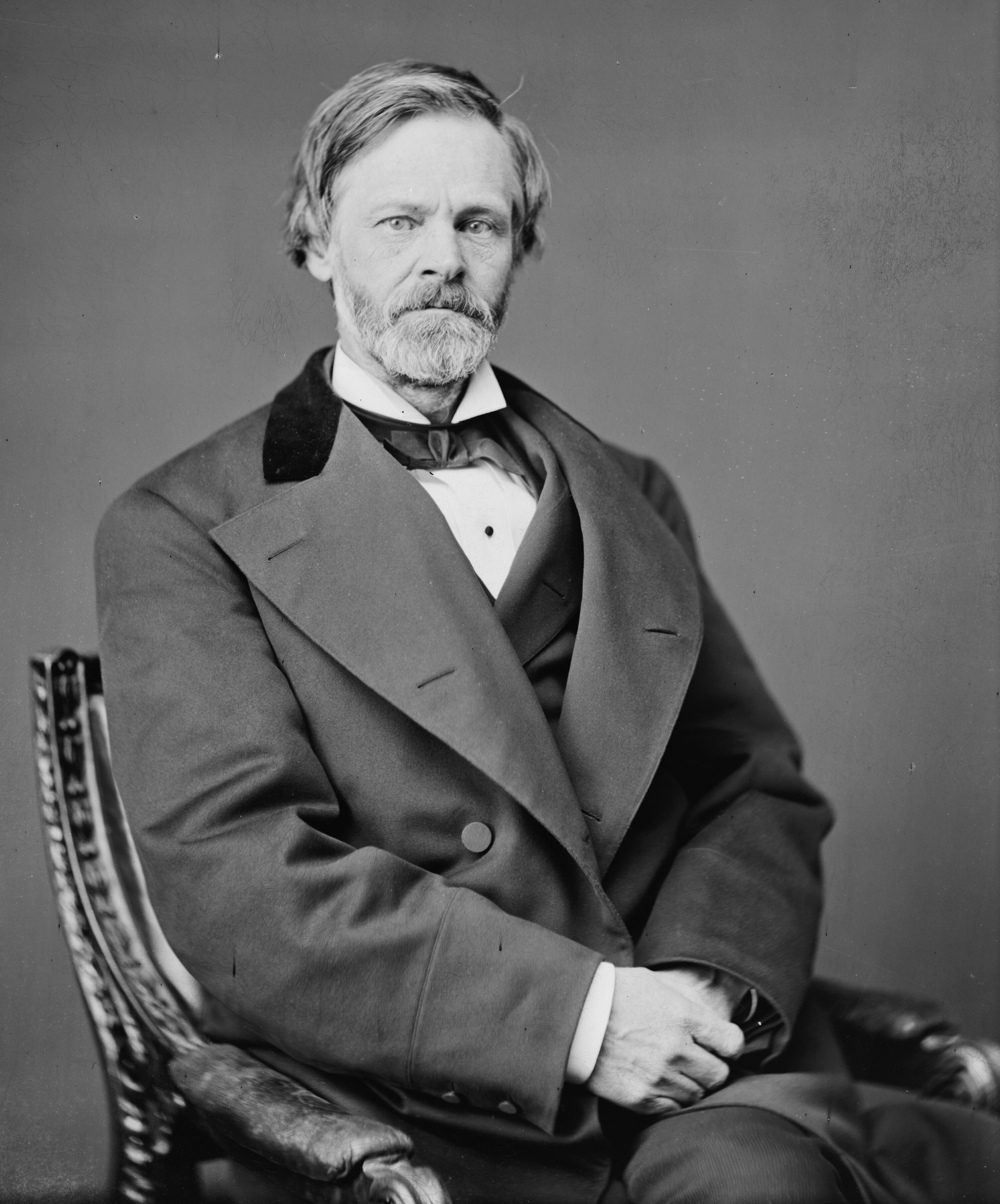
Treasury Secretary John Sherman worked with Hayes to return the country to the gold standard.

Hayes confronted two issues regarding the currency, the first of which was the coinage of silver, and its relation to gold. In 1873, the Coinage Act of 1873 stopped the coinage of silver for all coins worth a dollar or more, effectively tying the dollar to the value of gold. As a result, the money supply contracted and the effects of the Panic of 1873 grew worse, making it more expensive for debtors to pay debts they had contracted when currency was less valuable. Farmers and laborers, especially, clamored for the return of coinage in both metals, believing the increased money supply would restore wages and property values. Democratic Representative Richard P. Bland of Missouri proposed a bill to require the United States to coin as much silver as miners could sell the government, thus increasing the money supply and aiding debtors. William B. Allison, a Republican from Iowa, offered an amendment in the Senate limiting the coinage to two to four million dollars per month, and the resulting Bland–Allison Act passed both houses of Congress in 1878. Hayes feared the Act would cause inflation that would be ruinous to business, effectively impairing contracts that were based on the gold dollar, as the silver dollar proposed in the bill would have an intrinsic value of 90 to 92 percent of the existing gold dollar. He also believed that inflating the currency was dishonest, saying, "[e]xpediency and justice both demand an honest currency." He vetoed the bill, but Congress overrode his veto, the only time it did so during his presidency.

The second issue concerned United States Notes (commonly called greenbacks), a form of fiat currency first issued during the Civil War. The government accepted these notes as valid for payment of taxes and tariffs, but unlike ordinary dollars, they were not redeemable in gold. The Specie Payment Resumption Act of 1875 required the treasury to redeem any outstanding greenbacks in gold, thus retiring them from circulation and restoring a single, gold-backed currency. Sherman agreed with Hayes's favorable opinion of the Act, and stockpiled gold in preparation for the exchange of greenbacks for gold. But once the public was confident that they could redeem greenbacks for specie (gold), few did so; when the Act took effect in 1879, only $130,000 of the outstanding $346,000,000 in greenbacks were actually redeemed. Together with the Bland–Allison Act, the successful specie resumption effected a workable compromise between inflationists and hard money men and, as the world economy began to improve, agitation for more greenbacks and silver coinage quieted down for the rest of Hayes's presidency.

=== Foreign policy ===
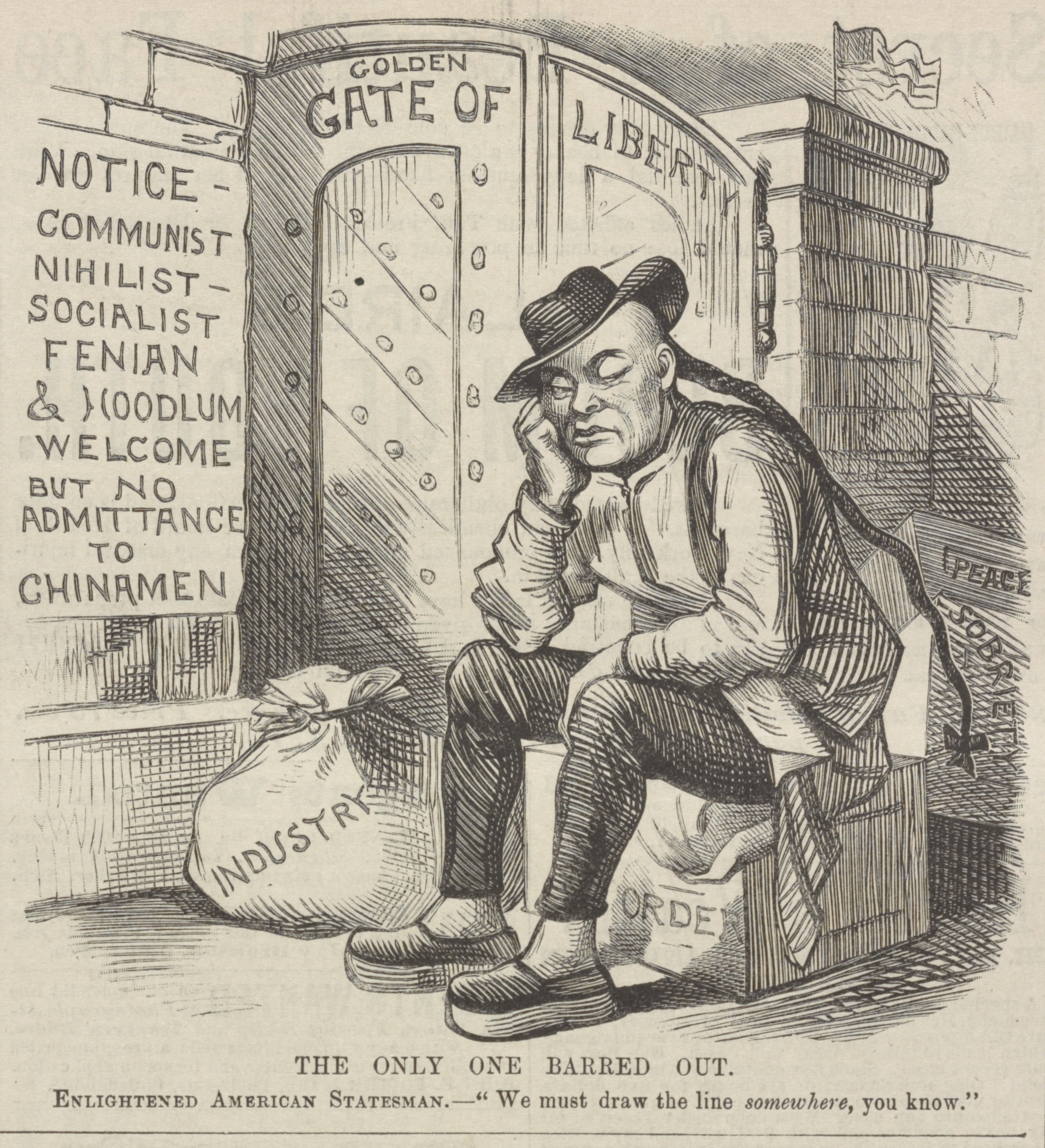
A political cartoon from 1882, criticizing Chinese exclusion

Most of Hayes's foreign policy concerns involved Latin America. In 1878, following the Paraguayan War, he arbitrated a territorial dispute between Argentina and Paraguay. Hayes awarded the disputed land in the Gran Chaco region to Paraguay, and the Paraguayans honored him by renaming a city (Villa Hayes) and a department (Presidente Hayes) in his honor. Hayes became concerned over the plans of Ferdinand de Lesseps, the builder of the Suez Canal, to construct a canal across the Isthmus of Panama, then part of Colombia. Worried about a repetition of French adventurism in Mexico, Hayes interpreted the Monroe Doctrine firmly. In a message to Congress, he explained his opinion on the canal: "The policy of this country is a canal under American control ... The United States cannot consent to the surrender of this control to any European power or any combination of European powers."

The Mexican border also drew Hayes's attention. Throughout the 1870s, "lawless bands" often crossed the border on raids into Texas. Three months after taking office, Hayes granted the Army the power to pursue bandits, even if it required crossing into Mexican territory. Mexican president Porfirio Díaz protested the order and sent troops to the border. The situation calmed as Díaz and Hayes agreed to jointly pursue bandits and Hayes agreed not to allow Mexican revolutionaries to raise armies in the United States. The violence along the border decreased, and in 1880, Hayes revoked the order allowing pursuit into Mexico.

Outside the Western Hemisphere, Hayes's biggest foreign policy concern dealt with China. In 1868, the Senate had ratified the Burlingame Treaty with China, allowing an unrestricted flow of Chinese immigrants into the United States. As the economy soured after the Panic of 1873, Chinese immigrants were blamed in the American West for depressing workmen's wages. During the Great Railroad Strike of 1877, anti-Chinese riots broke out in San Francisco, and a third party, the Workingman's Party, formed with an emphasis on stopping Chinese immigration. In response, Congress passed the Chinese Exclusion Act in 1879, abrogating the 1868 treaty.

"Political Suicide of President Hayes," a caricature of Hayes by George Frederick Keller published in The Wasp, March 8, 1879

Hayes vetoed the bill, believing that the United States should not abrogate treaties without negotiation. The veto drew praise from Northeastern New England Republicans, but Hayes was bitterly denounced in the Western United States. In the subsequent furor, Democrats in the House of Representatives attempted to impeach him, but narrowly failed when Republicans prevented a quorum by refusing to vote. After the veto, Assistant Secretary of State Frederick W. Seward suggested that the countries work together to reduce immigration, and he and James Burrill Angell negotiated with the Chinese to do so. Congress passed a new law to that effect, the Chinese Exclusion Act of 1882, after Hayes had left office.

In 1877, former President Grant embarked on a world tour shortly after his second term. Hayes was aware of Grant's popularity in Europe and encouraged Grant to extend his tour in the hope that it would improve various foreign relations and strengthen American interests abroad. When Grant was in Nice, he boarded USS Vandalia, a screw sloop-of-war that Hayes had personally sent for Grant's winter cruise about the Mediterranean and journey to Egypt.

=== Policy on Native Americans ===
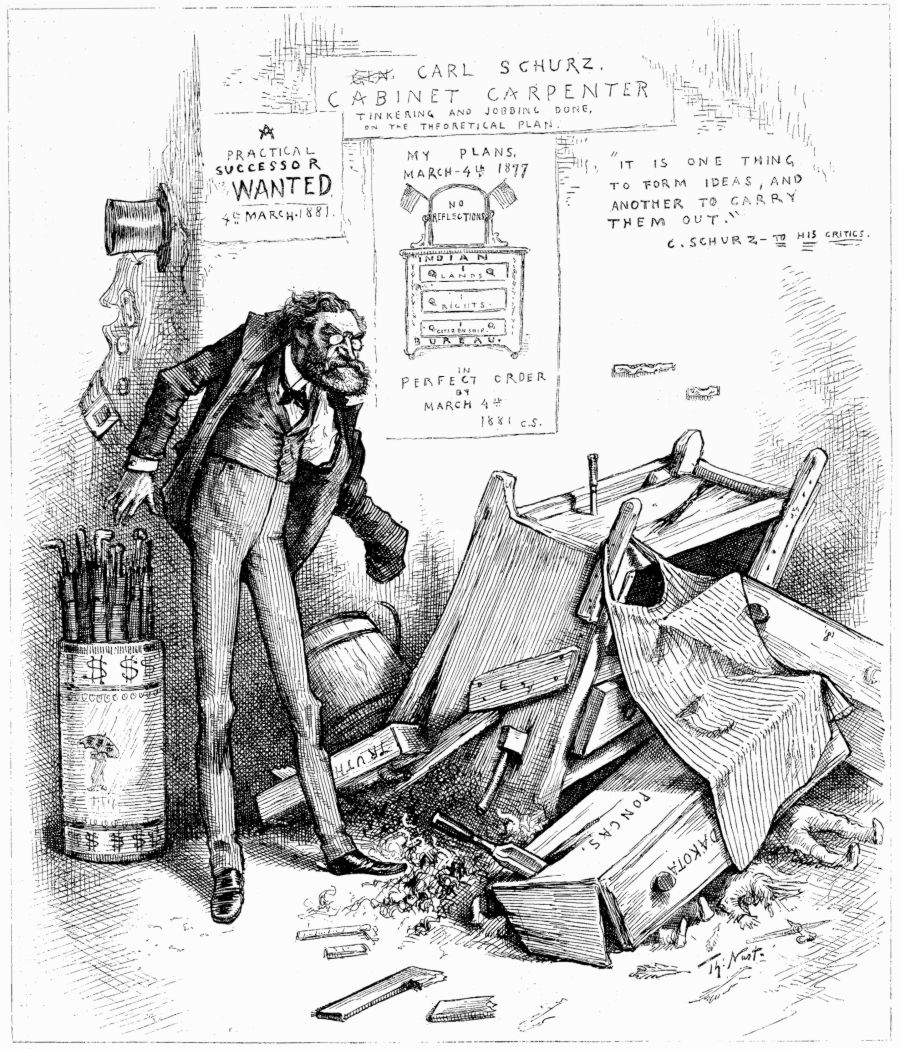
An 1881 political cartoon about Carl Schurz's management of the Indian Bureau

Interior Secretary Carl Schurz carried out Hayes's Native American policy, beginning with preventing the War Department from taking over the Bureau of Indian Affairs. Hayes and Schurz carried out a policy that included assimilation into white culture, educational training, and dividing Native land into individual household allotments. Hayes believed his policies would lead to self-sufficiency and peace between "Indians" and "whites". The allotment system under the Dawes Act, later signed by President Grover Cleveland in 1887, was favored by liberal reformers at the time, including Schurz, but instead proved detrimental to Native Americans. Natives lost much of their land through sales of what the government classified as "surplus lands", and more to unscrupulous white speculators who tried to get Natives to sell their allotments. Hayes and Schurz reformed the Bureau of Indian Affairs to reduce fraud and gave Native Americans responsibility for policing their reservations, but the Bureau was generally understaffed.

Hayes dealt with several conflicts with Native tribes. The Nez Perce, led by Chief Joseph, began an uprising in June 1877 when Major General Oliver O. Howard ordered them to move to a reservation. Howard's men defeated the Nez Perce in battle, and the tribe began a 1,700-mile retreat to Canada. In October, after a decisive battle at Bear Paw, Montana, Chief Joseph surrendered and William T. Sherman ordered the tribe transported to Indian Territory in Kansas, where they were forced to remain until 1885. The Nez Perce war was not the last conflict in the West, as the Bannock rose up in spring 1878 in Idaho and raided nearby settlements before being defeated by Howard's army in July. In 1879, war with the Ute tribe broke out in Colorado when some Ute killed Nathan Meeker, who had been attempting to convert the Ute to Christianity. The subsequent White River War ended when Schurz negotiated peace with the Ute and prevented white settlers from taking revenge for Meeker's death.

Hayes also became involved in resolving the removal of the Ponca tribe from Nebraska to Indian Territory (present-day Oklahoma) because of a misunderstanding during the Grant administration. The tribe's problems came to Hayes's attention after its chief, Standing Bear, filed a lawsuit to contest Schurz's demand that Native Americans stay in "Indian Territory". Overruling Schurz, Hayes set up a commission in 1880 that ruled the Ponca were free to return to their home territory in Nebraska or stay on their reservation. The Ponca were awarded compensation for their land rights, which had been previously granted to the Sioux. In a message to Congress in February 1881, Hayes insisted he would "give to these injured people that measure of redress which is required alike by justice and by humanity."

=== Great Western Tour of 1880 ===
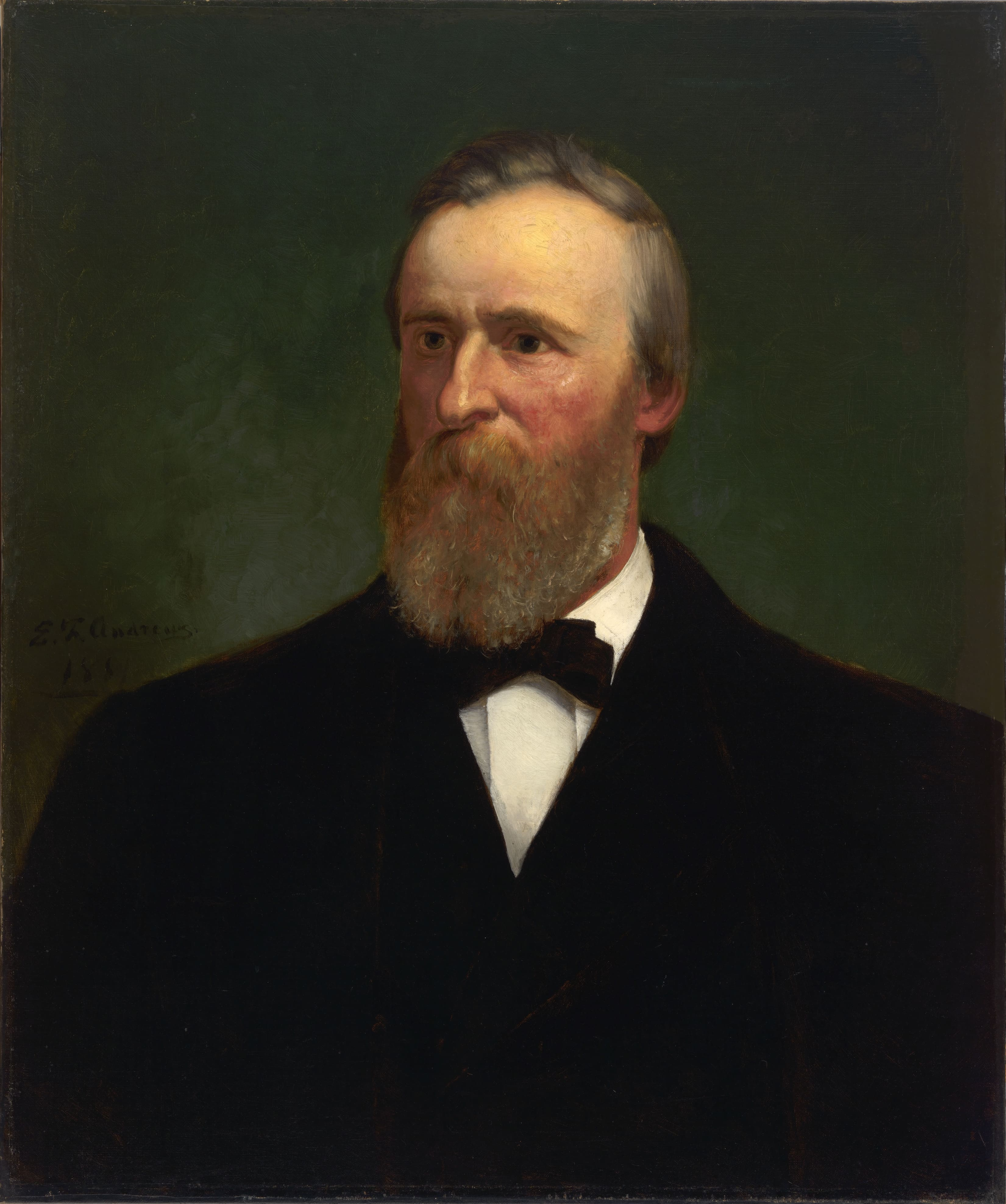
Portrait of Rutherford B. Hayes by Eliphalet Frazer Andrews, 1881

In 1880, Hayes embarked on a 71-day tour of the Western United States, becoming the second sitting president to travel west of the Rocky Mountains. (Hayes's immediate predecessor, Ulysses Grant, visited Utah in 1875.) His traveling party included his wife and William T. Sherman, who helped organize the trip. Hayes began his trip in September 1880, departing from Chicago on the transcontinental railroad. Hayes journeyed across the continent, ultimately arriving in California, stopping first in Wyoming and then Utah and Nevada, reaching Sacramento and San Francisco. By railroad and stagecoach, the party traveled north to Oregon, arriving in Portland, and from there to Vancouver, Washington. Going by steamship, they visited Seattle, and then returned to San Francisco. Hayes then toured several southwestern states before returning to Ohio in November, in time to cast a vote in the 1880 presidential election.

=== Hayes's White House ===
Hayes and his wife, Lucy, were known for their policy of keeping an alcohol-free White House, giving rise to her nickname "Lemonade Lucy". The first reception at the Hayes White House included wine, but Hayes was dismayed at drunken behavior at receptions hosted by ambassadors around Washington, leading him to follow his wife's temperance leanings. Alcohol was not served again in the Hayes White House. Critics charged Hayes with parsimony, but Hayes spent more money (which came out of his personal budget) after the ban, ordering that any savings from eliminating alcohol be used on more lavish entertainment. His temperance policy also paid political dividends, strengthening his support among Protestant ministers. Although Secretary Evarts quipped that at the White House dinners, "water flowed like wine," the policy was a success in convincing prohibitionists to vote Republican.

=== Judicial appointments ===
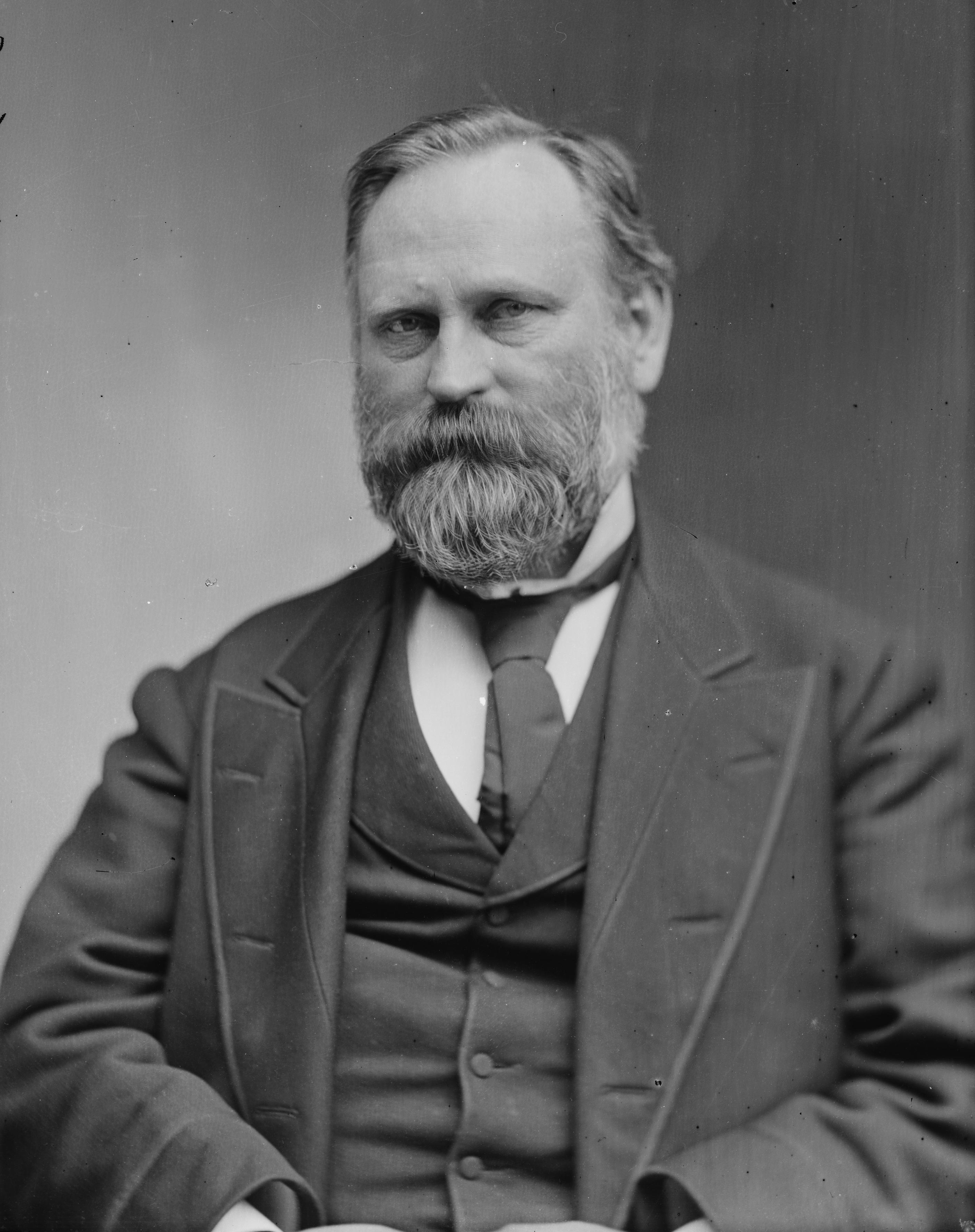
Stanley Matthews's confirmation to the Supreme Court was more difficult than Hayes expected.

Hayes appointed two Associate Justices to the Supreme Court. The first vacancy occurred when David Davis resigned to enter the Senate during the election controversy of 1876. On taking office, Hayes appointed John Marshall Harlan to the seat. A former candidate for governor of Kentucky, Harlan had been Benjamin Bristow's campaign manager at the 1876 Republican convention, and Hayes had earlier considered him for attorney general. Hayes submitted the nomination in October 1877, but it aroused some dissent in the Senate because of Harlan's limited experience in public office.

Harlan was nonetheless confirmed and served on the court for 34 years, voting (usually in the minority) for aggressive enforcement of civil rights laws. In 1880, a second seat became vacant when Justice William Strong resigned. Hayes nominated William Burnham Woods, a carpetbagger Republican circuit court judge from Alabama. Woods served six years on the Court, ultimately proving a disappointment to Hayes as he interpreted the Constitution in a manner more similar to that of Southern Democrats than to Hayes's own preference.

Hayes unsuccessfully attempted to fill a third vacancy in 1881. Justice Noah Haynes Swayne resigned with the expectation that Hayes would fill his seat by appointing Stanley Matthews, a friend of both men. Many senators objected to the appointment, believing that Matthews was too close to corporate and railroad interests, especially those of Jay Gould, and the Senate adjourned without voting on the nomination. The following year, when James A. Garfield entered the White House, he resubmitted Matthews's nomination to the Senate, which this time confirmed Matthews by one vote, 24 to 23. Matthews served for eight years until his death in 1889. His opinion in Yick Wo v. Hopkins in 1886 advanced his and Hayes's views on the protection of ethnic minorities' rights.

== Post-presidency (1881–1893) ==
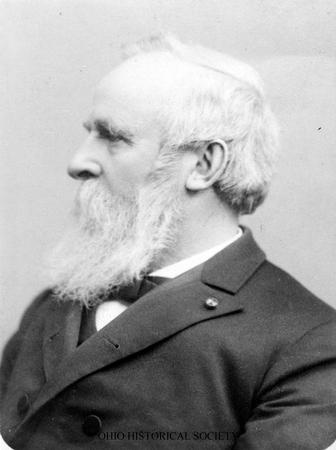
Hayes in 1886

Hayes declined to seek reelection in 1880, keeping his pledge not to run for a second term. During the 1880 Republican National Convention, he opposed the nomination of both Conkling and Arthur for the Vice Presidency, as well as opposing Grant's attempt to run for a third term. Hayes considered Grant a failure as president, and believed that the president should have a single six-year term. He was gratified by the election of fellow Ohio Republican James A. Garfield to succeed him, and consulted with him on appointments for the next administration. After Garfield's inauguration, Hayes and his family returned to Spiegel Grove.

In 1881, Hayes was elected a companion of the Military Order of the Loyal Legion of the United States. He served as commander-in-chief (national president) of the Loyal Legion from 1888 until his death in 1893. Although he remained a loyal Republican, Hayes was not too disappointed in Democrat Grover Cleveland's election to the presidency in 1884, approving of Cleveland's views on civil service reform. He was also pleased at the progress of the political career of William McKinley, his army comrade and political protégé.

Hayes became an advocate for educational charities and federal education subsidies for all children. He believed that education was the best way to heal the rifts in American society and allow people to improve themselves. In 1887, Hayes was appointed to the Board of Trustees of Ohio State University, the school he helped found as governor of Ohio. Hayes emphasized the need for vocational, as well as academic, education: "I preach the gospel of work," he wrote, "I believe in skilled labor as a part of education." He urged Congress, unsuccessfully, to pass a bill written by Senator Henry W. Blair that would have allowed federal aid for education for the first time. In 1889, Hayes gave a speech encouraging black students to apply for scholarships from the Slater Fund, one of the charities with which he was affiliated. One such student, W. E. B. Du Bois, received a scholarship in 1892. Hayes also advocated better prison conditions.

In retirement, Hayes was troubled by the disparity between the rich and the poor, saying in an 1886 speech, "free government cannot long endure if property is largely in a few hands and large masses of people are unable to earn homes, education, and a support in old age." The next year, he recorded thoughts on that subject in his diary:

In church it occurred to me that it is time for the public to hear that the giant evil and danger in this country, the danger which transcends all others, is the vast wealth owned or controlled by a few persons. Money is power. In Congress, in state legislatures, in city councils, in the courts, in the political conventions, in the press, in the pulpit, in the circles of the educated and the talented, its influence is growing greater and greater. Excessive wealth in the hands of the few means extreme poverty, ignorance, vice, and wretchedness as the lot of the many. It is not yet time to debate about the remedy. The previous question is as to the danger—the evil. Let the people be fully informed and convinced as to the evil. Let them earnestly seek the remedy and it will be found. Fully to know the evil is the first step towards reaching its eradication. Henry George is strong when he portrays the rottenness of the present system. We are, to say the least, not yet ready for his remedy. We may reach and remove the difficulty by changes in the laws regulating corporations, descents of property, wills, trusts, taxation, and a host of other important interests, not omitting lands and other property.

Although identified with conservatism, Hayes expressed sympathy with socialism, with one journal noting after his passing:

That socialism is not necessarily a revolutionary, or even extreme, doctrine, is evident in the fact that so conservative a man as the late ex-President Hayes was strongly in sympathy with that phase of thought. There is the best of authority for this statement. Mr. Hayes and Mr. W.D. Howells were friends, and it was the ex-president who first gave a socialistic direction to Mr. Howells's thoughts, and thus caused his work to have the decidedly socialistic character that now distinguishes it. Mr. Hayes was fond of citing our postal service, our public schools and other long established institutions as examples of practical socialism. When Mr. Bellamy's "Looking Backward" caused the nationalistic movement to shape itself in this country, Mr. Hayes expressed a cordial sympathy with the tendencies for which it stood.

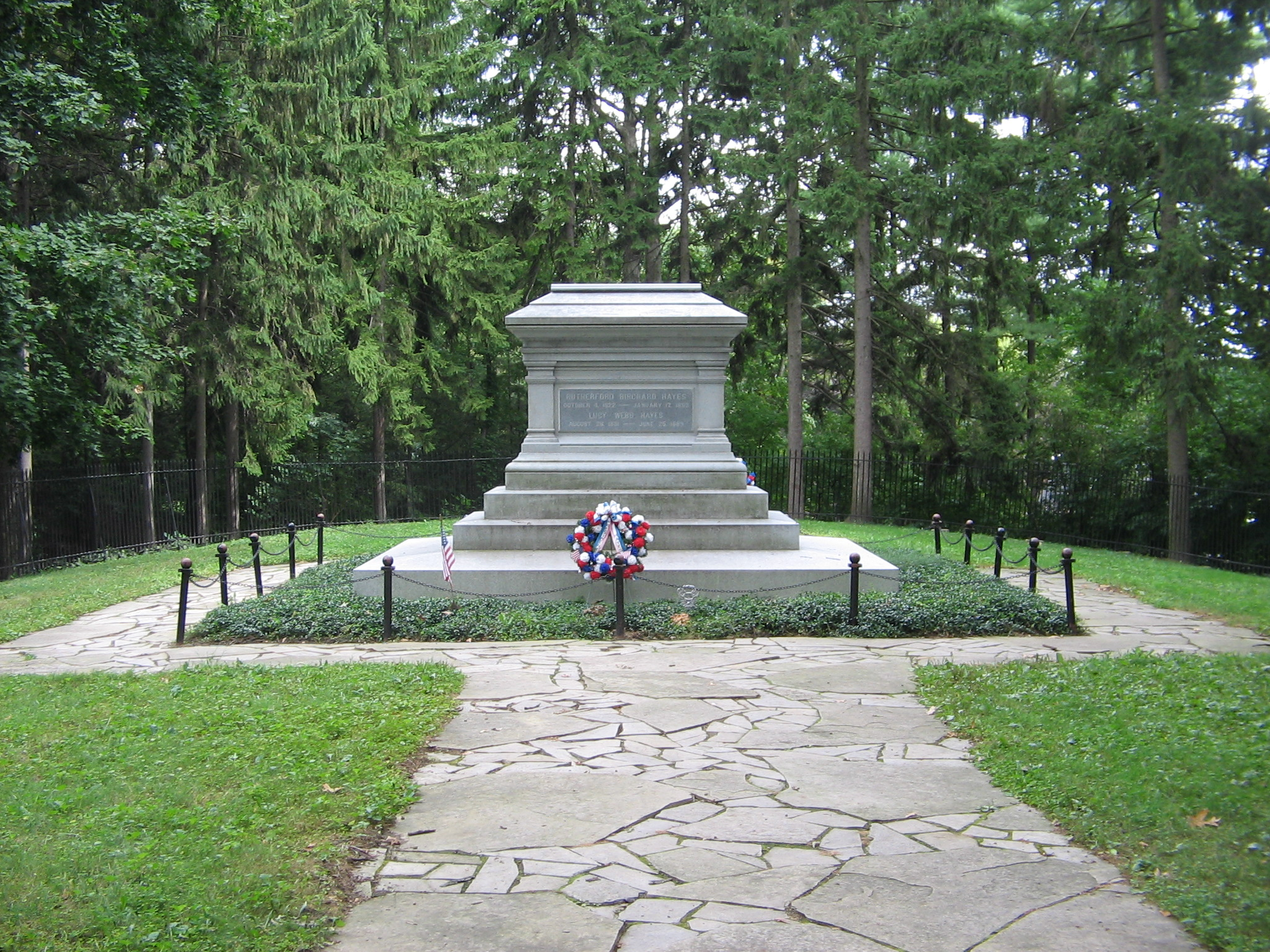
Hayes's grave at Spiegel Grove

Hayes was greatly saddened by his wife's death in 1889. When she died, Hayes wrote, "the soul had left [Spiegel Grove]". After Lucy's death, Hayes's daughter Fanny became his traveling companion, and he enjoyed visits from his grandchildren. In 1890, Hayes chaired the Lake Mohonk Conference on the Negro Question, a gathering of reformers that met in upstate New York to discuss racial issues.

Hayes died of complications from a heart attack at his home on January 17, 1893, at age 70. His last words were, "I know that I'm going where Lucy is." President-elect Cleveland and Ohio governor McKinley, who would be Cleveland's immediate successor in 1897, led the funeral procession that followed his body until Hayes was interred in Oakwood Cemetery in Fremont, Ohio. In 1915, Hayes's remains were moved to his former home in Spiegel Grove for burial with his wife Lucy.

== Legacy and honors ==
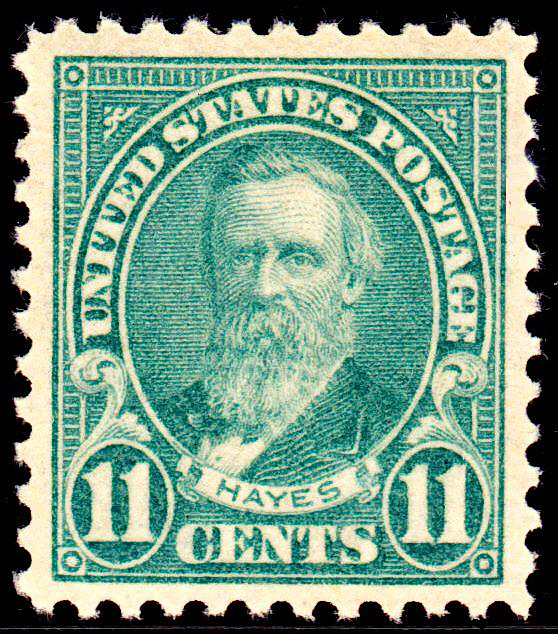
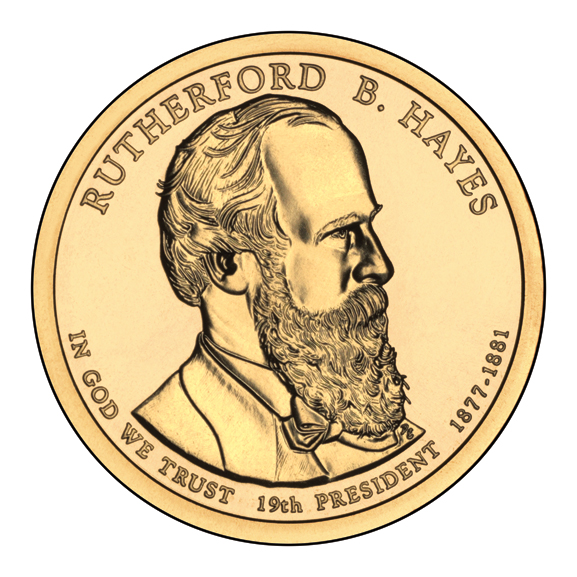
Left: Hayes postage stamp, 1922 issue
Right: Hayes presidential dollar coin, 2011

Biographer Ari Hoogenboom has written that Hayes's greatest achievement was to restore popular faith in the presidency and reverse the deterioration of executive power that had established itself after the assassination of Abraham Lincoln in 1865. His supporters have praised his commitment to civil service reform; his critics have derided his leniency toward former Confederate states as well as his withdrawal of federal support for African Americans' voting rights and civil rights. Historians and scholars generally rank Hayes as an below-average to average president.

After the donation of his home to the state of Ohio for Spiegel Grove State Park, Hayes was reinterred there in 1915. The next year the Hayes Commemorative Library and Museum, the country's first presidential library, opened on the site, funded by contributions from the state of Ohio and Hayes's family.

In 1922 the U.S. Post Office issued its first postage stamp honoring Hayes, 29 years after his death, on the 100th anniversary of his birth. Another Hayes stamp, a 19-cent issue, was released in 1938. In 2011, the U.S. Mint released a "Golden Dollar", the first item of U.S. currency to honor Hayes.

Hayes had arbitrated and decided an 1878 dispute between Argentina and Paraguay in favor of Paraguay, giving Paraguay 60% of its current territory. This led to the naming of a province in the region after him: Presidente Hayes Department (capital: Villa Hayes); an official holiday: Laudo Hayes Firm Day, the anniversary of the decision, celebrated in Presidente Hayes province; a local soccer team: Club Presidente Hayes (also known as "Los Yanquis"), based in the national capital, Asunción; a postage stamp, the design of which was chosen in a contest run by the U.S. Embassy; and even the granting of the wish of a young girl who came out of a coma—a trip to the Hayes Presidential Center in Fremont, Ohio.

Also named for Hayes is Hayes County, Nebraska. Hayes was elected a member of the American Antiquarian Society on October 21, 1890.

Rutherford B. Hayes High School in Hayes's hometown of Delaware, Ohio, was named in his honor, as is Hayes Hall, built in 1893, at the Ohio State University. It is Ohio State's oldest remaining building, and was placed on the National Register of Historic Places on July 16, 1970, due to its front facade, which remains virtually untouched from its original appearance. Hayes knew the building would be named in his honor, but did not live to see it completed. The City of Delaware also erected a statue of Hayes.

== See also ==
- Bibliography of Rutherford B. Hayes
- List of Harvard University politicians
- List of presidents of the United States
- List of presidents of the United States by previous experience

== Notes ==
U.S. House of Representatives
Preceded by Alexander Long	Member of the U.S. House of Representatives from Ohio's 2nd congressional district 1865–1867	Succeeded by Samuel Fenton Cary
Party political offices
Preceded by Jacob Dolson Cox	Republican nominee for Governor of Ohio; 1867, 1869	Succeeded by Edward Follansbee Noyes
Preceded by Edward Follansbee Noyes	Republican nominee for Governor of Ohio; 1875	Succeeded by William H. West
Preceded by Ulysses S. Grant	Republican nominee for President of the United States; 1876	Succeeded by James A. Garfield
Political offices
Preceded by Jacob Dolson Cox	Governor of Ohio; 1868–1872	Succeeded by Edward Follansbee Noyes
Preceded by William Allen	Governor of Ohio; 1876–1877	Succeeded by Thomas L. Young
Preceded by Ulysses S. Grant	President of the United States; 1877–1881	Succeeded by James A. Garfield
