= General José María Bruguez =

Coordinates: 24°45′S 58°49′W

- District
- Location within Paraguay
- Country: Paraguay
- Department: Presidente Hayes
- Time zone: -4 Gmt

Municipality of General Bruguez, Department of President Hayes, Chaco, Paraguay.

General José María Bruguez is a district in the department of Presidente Hayes, Paraguay.

== Climate ==
Climate data for General Bruguez (1991–2020)
Month	Jan	Feb	Mar	Apr	May	Jun	Jul	Aug	Sep	Oct	Nov	Dec	Year
Mean daily maximum °C (°F)	34.2 (93.6)	33.3 (91.9)	32.3 (90.1)	30.1 (86.2)	25.9 (78.6)	25.0 (77.0)	24.7 (76.5)	27.6 (81.7)	29.0 (84.2)	31.1 (88.0)	31.7 (89.1)	33.2 (91.8)	29.8 (85.6)
Daily mean °C (°F)	27.6 (81.7)	26.7 (80.1)	25.4 (77.7)	22.7 (72.9)	18.9 (66.0)	17.5 (63.5)	16.4 (61.5)	18.6 (65.5)	21.1 (70.0)	24.1 (75.4)	25.0 (77.0)	26.9 (80.4)	22.6 (72.7)
Mean daily minimum °C (°F)	22.3 (72.1)	21.8 (71.2)	20.7 (69.3)	18.1 (64.6)	14.5 (58.1)	12.9 (55.2)	11.0 (51.8)	12.3 (54.1)	14.9 (58.8)	18.7 (65.7)	19.5 (67.1)	21.6 (70.9)	17.3 (63.1)
Average precipitation mm (inches)	122.2 (4.81)	156.5 (6.16)	140.8 (5.54)	139.4 (5.49)	96.2 (3.79)	46.1 (1.81)	31.1 (1.22)	27.0 (1.06)	59.6 (2.35)	114.3 (4.50)	167.6 (6.60)	143.3 (5.64)	1,244.1 (48.98)
Source: NOAA
