= Juan Francisco Amancio González y Escobar =

- Born: Juan Francisco Amancio González y Escobar
- Died: Emboscada, Paraguay
- Known for: Priest

Juan Francisco Amancio González y Escobar was a Roman Catholic priest responsible for the spiritual colonization of the Christians in Chaco.

== Childhood and education ==
Juan Francisco Amancio González y Escobar was son of Captain Francisco González Durán and Josefa Antonia de Escobar y Gutiérrez.

He made his religious studies in Asunción, obtaining the bachelor's degree. He was self-taught in his intellectual formation, which made him deserving of the position of Ecclesiastic Prosecutor and Examiner Synodical.

He had great knowledge of Roman and Canonical Law, and was an eloquent orator of adventurous temperament.

== Career ==
Father Amancio González, priest of Emboscada, was founder of the Melodía Mission, located in the colony Nueva Burdeos in times of Carlos Antonio López, later called Villa Occidental and nowadays Villa Hayes, capital of the Boquerón department, in the Paraguayan Chaco.

The name Melodía was chosen in homage of the governor Pedro Melo of Portugal, with the purpose of gaining his support in the consolidation of the evangelical project to subdue the natives of the region.

Amancio González was priest in Emboscada since he was ordered in 1761. During the twenty-five years of ministry, he suffered along with the citizens, the constant siege of the natives of Chaco, who made that territory hostile, killing, stealing and taking colonials prisoner.

He wrote in his diaries that the guards near the colonial establishments were insufficient because they lack the necessary resources to stop the attacks.

He thought that it was urgent to establish a population stable enough where he could reach to the natives and conquer with the Faith. He wanted to live among them, gain their trust and integrate them to the civilization.

The previously mentioned mission was established in 1786, thanks to the help of some benefactors and the resources of the priest, who suffered great loss of his patrimony.

The Town Council of Asunción found convenient the establishment of the Mission in the other side of the river, in the part north of the Confuso River. In spite of having recommended it, the help of the government was poor, limiting to the remission of 25 horses as official contribution to the project to convert the natives.

The surviving of the village and the provision of food was very important so the natives would not go back to their tribes or unite with other nations; nevertheless, the propositions of the governor for this effect did not obtain the Viceroy’s authorization.

Father González left Emboscada with two canoes filled with tools and supplies, twenty men and the constant company of Father Hermenegildo Rosas. Near Peñón he entered the Confuso River and in a place near the hills, he determined where to establish a small fort. In the highest hill he set a cross, symbol of his spiritual commitment.

This, apparently unimportant fact, meant the mark of territorial rights of Paraguay and later would serve the lawyer Benjamín Aceval to defend and ensure the rights over the land of Hayes.

Once the state was settled, the governors finally sent six soldiers to the fortress Peñón and cannon with four gunpowder charges and shrapnel, also a hundred bullets. Unfortunately for the Missioner, the soldiers arrived without provisions of food, and proceeded to consume the little reserve of food they had in the fortress.

The same happened every time the Governor made an official visit; he always arrived with his entire committee and made use of all the resources of the place, including horses and food. The priest could find the positive side of this “official visits”.

On December 1788, he received some hope when was informed of the royal approval that congratulated his labor. The joy was short-lived, because the economic support was never present.

The interaction with the natives was marked by intense suspicions and distrust that gradually was diminishing.

In spite of the friendly treatment, with the passing years, the native Tobas and Machicuis became bold and proceed to steal horses and cattle, attacking the population constantly.

When the first states of white people settled near the fort, the native Lenguas, Tobas, Machicuis, Pitilagas and Enimagas, attracted by the possibility of getting meat, stealing cows and horses, became even more usual.

Father Amancio never ceased to try to accomplish better and friendly interactions with the natives, although without stopping to referring to them as liars, traitors and greedy. About him, Monsignor Agustín Blujaki, said that in spite the difficulties he had to endure, instead of being diminished his goodness, it only grew more every day.

Cattle was sent to Melodía from the nearby states of Emboscada and from other farer regions, but the permanent lack of security, due to the inefficiency of the troops the government assigned to the place to defend it from the natives, compromised the future of the mission.

“The constant stealing that is experienced here every day, every week, every month, and every moment. There is not a thing that remains save. Everything is stolen, the tools, the knives, the ribbons, the supplies. The only thing that has yet to be stolen is my inkpot” These were the terms in which he expressed his disillusion after he grew older and tired.

The unruly natives settled small family groups around the place with the only purpose of maintaining watch over the cattle ranches and watering places, from which they could steal the animals easily. They seemed unstoppable in their eagerness to commit robbery.

In between the regular administration tasks, Father Amancio received the annoying and constant pressure of the Governor to help the official commissions that were sent to explore the Chaco towards the Coast of Pilcomayo River, for which purpose he was required to give men, horses and cattle.

The fights among some tribes and the inopportune alliance of the Governor with the natives Payaguá, to which he entrusts the coast of Chaco, lead to slaughters that made unbearable the life in the village.

== Last years ==
Twenty years after the river was crossed for the first time, the old and disappointed priest decided to renounce his position. He went back to Emboscada and died soon after.

== Homage ==
In August 1904, the priest Fidel Maíz proposed to raise a monument in homage of Amancio González.

The Town Council of Emboscada agreed and raised in the Church’s square a wall with an effigy on bronze that prays: “In memory of Priest Amancio González y Escobar, illustrious missioner, great Paraguayan. Forever father of Emboscada”.

A renowned artery of neighborhood Vista Alegre, in Asunción was named after him.
