= Villa Hayes =

- City
- Villa Hayes
- Location within Paraguay
- Coordinates: 25°06′00″S 57°34′00″W
- Country: Paraguay
- Department: Presidente Hayes
- Founded: 1786
- Founder: Father Juan Francisco Amancio González y Escobar

Government
  - Intendente Municipal: Basilio Gustavo Nuñez Gimenez

Area
  - Total: 20,002 km^{2} (7,723 sq mi)
- Elevation: 55 m (180 ft)

Population (2008)
  - Total: 57,217
  - Density: 2.8606/km^{2} (7.4088/sq mi)
- Time zone: UTC-04 (AST)
  - Summer (DST): UTC-03 (ADT)
- Postal code: 9900
- Area code: (595) (26)
- Climate: Cfa

Villa Hayes (Spanish pronunciation: [ˈbiʎa ˈaʝes]) is a city in Paraguay, and is the capital of Presidente Hayes Department.

== Name ==
Known as "the City of the Five Names", it was eventually named in honor of Rutherford B. Hayes, 19th President of the United States.

== Geography ==
Villa Hayes is situated on the north bank of the Paraguay River, 31 kilometres (19 mi) north of Asunción City.

=== Weather ===
The city temperature in summer reaches 44 °C (111 °F) and drops to 0 °C (32 °F) in the winter. The average temperature is 23 °C (73 °F).

== Environment ==
In 2023 and 2024, in the Western Region, most of the fires occurred in the Presidente Hayes Department. Reported on the 1st of October 2020, when within 24 hours, there were more than 12,000 fires raging in Paraguay, the Presidente Hayes Department was the department with the highest number of fires in Paraguay, with 8,617 different fires recorded in the previous 24 hours, with the city of Villa Hayes concentrating most of them with 6,105 hotspots in the same time period.

== Demography ==
At the time of the 2002 census, Villa Hayes had a population of 19,001, (10,071 men and 9,930 women). Of these 2,049 lived in the city and 16,592 in the rural areas.

There are a number of different ethnicities among the city's inhabitants, including Native Americans, Europeans, Mennonites, and Paraguayans.

The Native Americans living in the city include members of the Nivaclé, Angaiteçé, Chané, Maká, Chamacoco, and Toba Qom tribes.

== Economy ==
ACEPAR (Aceros del Paraguay), Paraguay's principal steel manufacturer, is based in Villa Hayes. However, most of the city's inhabitants work in the cattle trade and to a lesser extent in agriculture.

== Tourism ==
Villa Hayes has a museum where uniforms, weapons, photographs, and other artifacts from the Chaco War are displayed. There is also a display of antique coins as well as animals of the region.

During the Chaco War, the Hospital de Sangre (field hospital) stood in what is now the city's Main Square.

The city's church and historic buildings are important tourist attractions.

The Festival del Acero (Steel Festival) is celebrated annually and features many artistic and cultural presentations.

There is a monument honoring American President Rutherford Hayes and another one for Benjamín Aceval on the bank of the Paraguay River. These men played prominent roles in resolving Paraguay's borders after the War of the Triple Alliance.

The Home Office and the Economics Faculty of the National University are located on one of the main streets of the city.

In the nearby countryside are the hills Galván and Confuso, as well as Patiño and the Natural Reserve Trinfunqué Park, which shelters many of the plants and animals typical of this region of Paraguay.

The Melodia Cultural Centre is based in a house built around 1870 for General Bartolomé Mitre. It is considered historically significant and is frequently visited by architecture students from all over the country. The Centre includes a library, holds information classes and is an important promoter of local culture and education.

== History ==
The town was originally known as Amancio Cué. In 1786 the city became the site of a Jesuit Mission founded by Father Juan Francisco Amancio González y Escobar with the name Reducción Melodía (Melody Mission) in honor of the Governor Pedro Melo.

The town was re-established during the 1841-1862 government of Carlos Antonio López and renamed Nueva Burdeos (New Bordeaux) by a colony of 120 French families. However, it did not prosper and was founded again the next year as Villa Occidental (Western Town). In the late 1860s, when Argentine soldiers occupied the city during the Paraguayan War, they called it Villa Argentina.

Finally, the city was named Villa Hayes, in accordance with the decree signed by President Cándido Bareiro, on May 13, 1879. This name was chosen to honor the American President, Rutherford Hayes, who on November 13, 1878, had been asked to arbitrate between Paraguay and Argentina after the Paraguayan War. His award of the disputed Gran Chaco region to Paraguay made him a national hero.

On November 12, 2018, Villa Hayes and Fremont, Ohio (home and burial site of President Hayes) became sister cities.

== Transportation ==
The main access to the city is via the Road IX Carlos Antonio López or Transchaco Road. The principal public transport is by bus routes 46 and 5.

Nicolás Bó Aerodrome (Sargento De Aviacion Nicolo Bo, ICAO:SGNB) is located near Villa Hayes, although it is used for training flights and does not have a paved runway or regular passenger service. Passenger airlines operate from Silvio Pettirossi International Airport, approximately 22 km southwest of Villa Hayes.

== Gallery ==
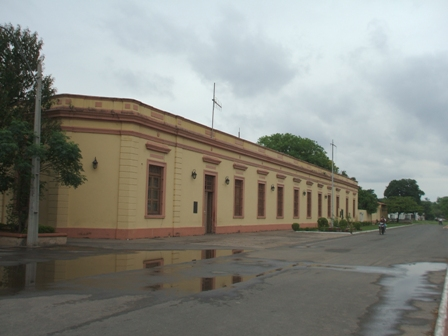
Government Building of Presidente Hayes near the Paraguay river

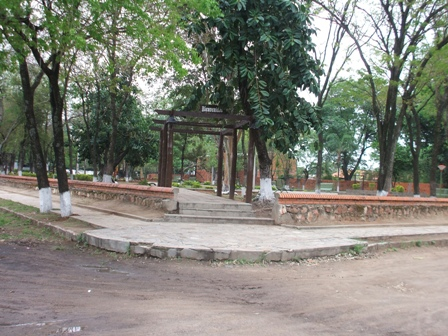
The city's plaza, formerly the Field hospital

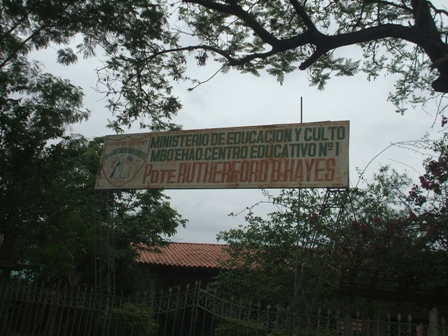
Rutherford B. Hayes School

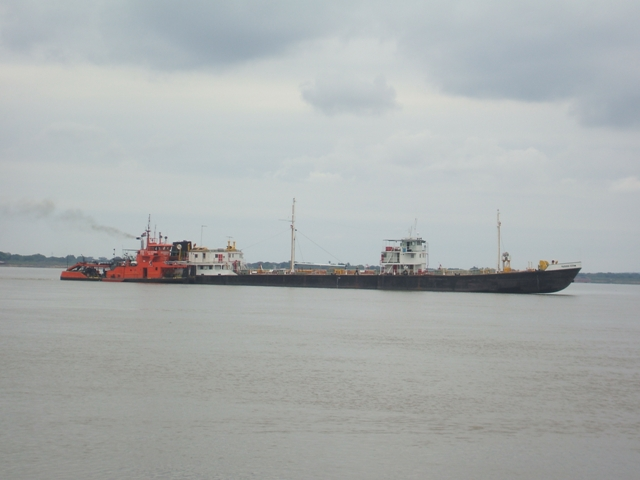
A ship on the Paraguay River viewed from Villa Hayes

== See also ==
- Deforestation in Paraguay
- Bibliography of Rutherford B. Hayes
