= Benjamín Aceval =

Benjamín Aceval may refer to:

- Benjamín Aceval (diplomat), Paraguayan statesman, educator and diplomat
- Benjamín Aceval, Paraguay, a city in the department of Presidente Hayes, Paraguay, named for the diplomat
