= Emboscada, Paraguay =

Emboscada
- Town & District
- Flag Coat of arms
- Interactive map of Emboscada
- Coordinates: 25°07′24″S 57°21′19″W
- Country: Paraguay
- Department: Cordillera

Government
  - Intendente Municipal: Jacinto Raul Peña Silva

Area
  - Total: 265 km^{2} (102 sq mi)
- Elevation: 192 m (630 ft)

Population (2008)
  - Total: 12,225
  - Density: 46/km^{2} (120/sq mi)
- Time zone: UTC-4 (-4 Gmt)
- Postal code: 3210
- Area code: (595) (529)

Emboscada is a town and district of the Cordillera Department, Paraguay.

== Etymology ==
“San Agustín de la Emboscada” refers to an ambush before the Spanish Conquest (emboscada meaning ambush in Spanish), against Carios tribe made by Guaicurú people. It is also known as the Stone City because many people there work in mining.

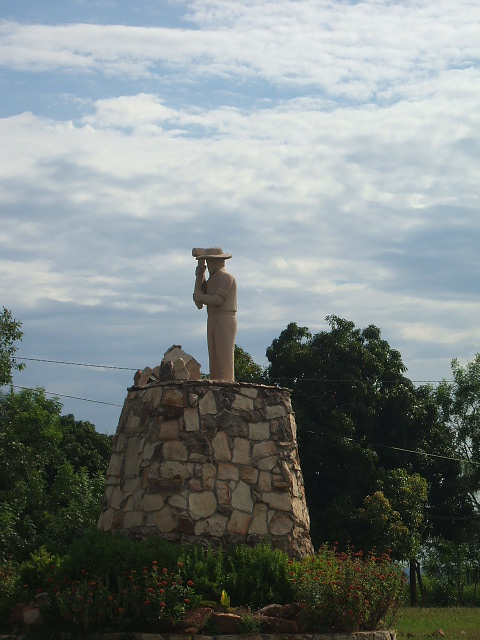
Emboscada

== Weather ==
The weather in Cordillera Region is mild and dry. Temperature ranges from 22 °C to 39 °C, in winter the temperature is 3 °C.

== Demographics ==
Emboscada has 12,225 inhabitants, of which 6,337 are men and 5,888 women (Census 2002) In the urban area 5,153 people and the rural area with 7,072 people. 80% of Emboscada's population considers itself to be of African descent.

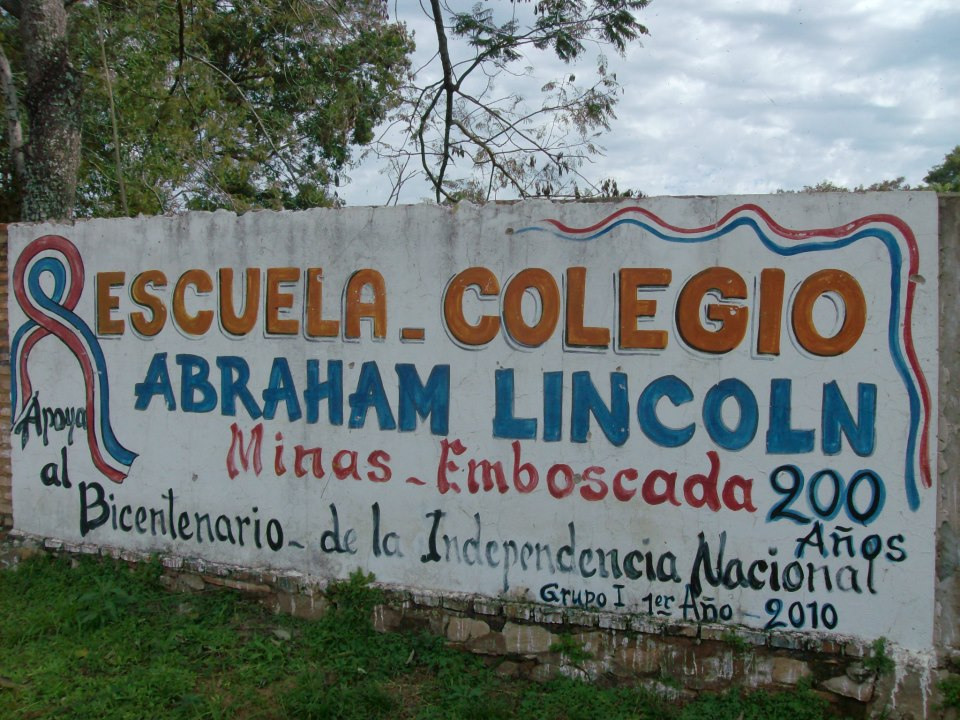
A school in the Afro-Paraguay city of Emboscada that pays tribute to the American president credited with freeing slaves in the United States.

== History ==
The first settlers were slaves from Brazil called “libertos” in XVIII. It was founded in 1740 by Governor Rafael de la Moneda with the name of “San Agustín de la Emboscada”. The most important penitentiary of Paraguay was built in Emboscada in 1816. During Stroessner's dictatorship it worked as the prison for convicts of political issues.

== Economy ==
The most important activity is mining. Others industries are coffee, oil, and fishing.

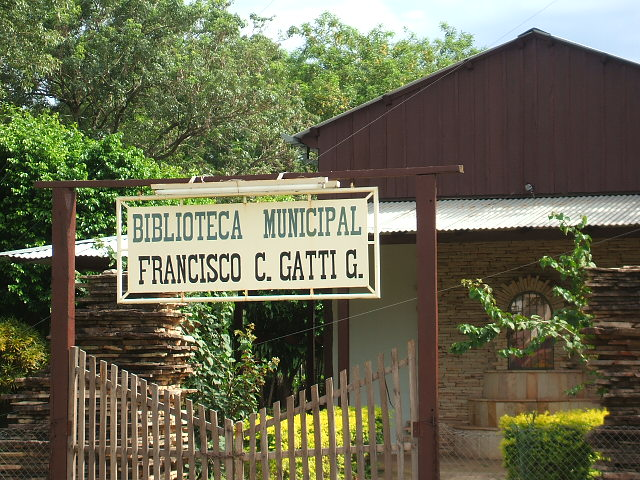
Library in Emboscada

== Transportation ==
It is located 38 km from Asunción, to get there one needs to go through PY03. From Emboscada you can visit Nueva Colombia and from this city Loma Grande, through a paved road. From Loma Grande one can get to Altos, Atyrá and San Bernardino. All these cities have paved roads connected to PY02.

== Tourism ==
On June 24. in minas a small town, there is a festival honoring San Francisco Solano. During this parade people walk behind San Francisco Solano's image singing and praying throughout the town till they get to the church. They wear masks and dance to drums rhythms, as a way to remember their ancestors, enslaved Africans. There is a lot of typical food, many local bands and pilgrims wearing feathers and leaves from banana plants together at the big square dancing and giving thanks for the favours to San Francisco Solano.

The church was built by Priest Amancio Gonzalez in 1774 honoring San Agustín, the altarpieces and the images made of carved woods belong to the Franciscan Style, the walls, doors and windows were engraved in the 18th century. The craftmanship of this place consists of making hats, they make it from karanda´y (a kind of palm), and a fan shaped object. They also make sweets, “guampa” a special kind of glass made of wood (usually palo santo) to drink tereré and mate, they also make sweets and finery from ysypo, a kind of liane.

== Notable people ==
- Juan Francisco Amancio González y Escobar
