= Loma Plata =

- City
- Location in Paraguay
- Coordinates: 22°23′19″S 59°50′10″W
- Country: Paraguay
- Department: Boquerón
- Founded: June 25, 1927

Government
  - Intendente: Ernst Giesbrecht
- Elevation: 133 m (436 ft)

Population (2017)
  - Total: 16,460
- Time zone: UTC-03:00 (PYT)
- Postal code: 9370
- Area code: (595)(492)
- Climate: BSh

Loma Plata is a city in the district (distrito) of the Department of Boquerón, Paraguay. It is located 407 km from Asunción by a paved detour of 22 km from the Ruta Transchaco. It is the main town of the Menno Colony, one of the Mennonite colonies of the Paraguayan Chaco.

== Climate ==
The temperature in summer reaches up to 44°C and can drop to 0°C in winter. The average temperature is 26°C. The rainy season lasts from December through March.

Climate data for Loma Plata
Month	Jan	Feb	Mar	Apr	May	Jun	Jul	Aug	Sep	Oct	Nov	Dec	Year
Record high °C (°F)	46.5 (115.7)	47.5 (117.5)	43.3 (109.9)	42.2 (108.0)	39.1 (102.4)	39.1 (102.4)	39.1 (102.4)	44.4 (111.9)	46.5 (115.7)	45.4 (113.7)	47.5 (117.5)	46.5 (115.7)	47.5 (117.5)
Mean daily maximum °C (°F)	37.6 (99.7)	36.4 (97.5)	34.5 (94.1)	31.5 (88.7)	27.0 (80.6)	25.4 (77.7)	25.6 (78.1)	30.4 (86.7)	34.1 (93.4)	35.9 (96.6)	36.5 (97.7)	37.2 (99.0)	32.7 (90.8)
Daily mean °C (°F)	31.4 (88.5)	30.3 (86.5)	28.4 (83.1)	25.4 (77.7)	22.0 (71.6)	20.3 (68.5)	20.4 (68.7)	23.5 (74.3)	27.1 (80.8)	28.5 (83.3)	29.5 (85.1)	30.2 (86.4)	26.4 (79.5)
Mean daily minimum °C (°F)	25.2 (77.4)	24.8 (76.6)	22.7 (72.9)	20.5 (68.9)	17.0 (62.6)	15.9 (60.6)	15.1 (59.2)	17.2 (63.0)	20.0 (68.0)	22.8 (73.0)	23.1 (73.6)	24.7 (76.5)	20.8 (69.4)
Record low °C (°F)	15.9 (60.6)	16.9 (62.4)	12.7 (54.9)	6.3 (43.3)	5.3 (41.5)	3.2 (37.8)	1.1 (34.0)	3.2 (37.8)	7.4 (45.3)	11.6 (52.9)	12.7 (54.9)	12.8 (55.0)	1.1 (34.0)
Average precipitation mm (inches)	134 (5.3)	160 (6.3)	133 (5.2)	114 (4.5)	99 (3.9)	49 (1.9)	31 (1.2)	22 (0.9)	35 (1.4)	110 (4.3)	141 (5.6)	167 (6.6)	1,195 (47.1)
Average precipitation days (≥ 1.0 mm)	15	14	12	11	12	8	5	3	5	11	13	13	122
Source: Weather and Climate

== History ==
After Russia introduced general conscription in 1874, about a third of the Russian Mennonites migrated to the US and Canada, as Mennonite churches have a tradition of non-violence. The members of the Colonia Menno (of which Loma Plata is the current largest town and administrative center), initially settled in Canada until a universal, compulsory, secular education was implemented in 1917 that required the use of the English language. Conservative Mennonites saw this as a threat to the religious basis of their community. In 1927, 1,743 pioneers came from Canada to Paraguay, turning the arid Chaco into fertile farmland. It was the first Mennonite colony in the region. Some years later, more Mennonite immigrants from Germany and Russia arrived in the Chaco area and founded the Fernheim (1930) and Neuland (1947) colonies.

The Mennonites' arrival was not properly prepared for by the Casado complex; the land had not been surveyed, no railroad had been constructed in the settlement location, and settlement was delayed by 16 months during which the Mennonites stayed in Puerto Casado.

With no railway, the settlers traveled with oxen carts through underdeveloped roads. The gradual move to the settlement area started in April 1928. Initially, some families lived in wilderness camps, while many still lived in Puerto Casado. Many became sick due to the lack of medical care, where 121 died, 75 of them being children under 14 years. Some 60 families returned to Canada. Eventually, they formed 14 villages. Over time, infrastructure was built alongside houses such as schools and churches. Today, the Menno Colony has about 9,000 descendants of the approximately 1,200 settlers, and a multicultural demographic including Mennonites, indigenous Paraguayans, Latin Paraguayans, and other smaller groups.

In 1937, Loma Plata emerged as the colony center, and a colony office was built (currently the Post office). Loma Plata is a Spanish name. Some settlers rejected it and petitioned for a German name. Loma Plata was unofficially renamed "Sommerfeld" but reverted to its publicly recognized name of Loma Plata within a dozen years.

Today, Loma Plata is the main town of the colony and home to an agricultural co-operative, La Cooperativa Chortitzer Ltda., which focuses on dairy and meat production.

== Church ==
The first and biggest church building was built in Osterwick outside Loma Plata. Today there are several German-speaking Mennonite churches as well as Spanish-speaking churches. Some German-speaking Churches include Emmanuelgemeinde, Elimgemeinde, Mennonitengemeinde, Bethelgemeinde, Hoffnung für Alle, and Manoagemeinde. Agua Viva is a Mennonite Spanish-speaking church. There are also Spanish/Portuguese-speaking Pentecostal churches.

== Economy ==
Residents of Loma Plata are engaged in agriculture, livestock, and industry. They are organized in La Cooperativa Chortitzer Ltda. There are some big dairies in the region, with about 5,000 people living in Loma Plata. There are also two big supermarkets, several smaller supermarkets, corner shops, hardware stores, a bookshop with German, English, and Spanish books, and many small clothes shops all over Loma Plata.

== Health ==
Loma Plata contains one of the 4 hospitals in the Department of Boquerón. It was constructed in 1948. The work and costs were largely covered voluntarily and with donations. The first building had a size of 17x50 feet with a consultation room, a laboratory, a pharmacy, and three rooms for patients.

Today, the hospital in Loma Plata is a modern health facility and is part of the services provided by the Asociacion Civil Chortitzer Komitee. It does not provide services exclusively to Mennonite colony members. Outward specialists come to the colony at scheduled times throughout the year to provide services including childbirth.

There is a health clinic at the hospital as well as a private health clinic in Loma Plata. Loma Plata has a nursing school where students can obtain a degree as licensed nurses in cooperation with Universidad Evangelica de Paraguay.

There are also several private medical clinics in the town, some with doctors that work privately as well as in the hospital. There are dental clinics as well. All pharmacies are private, with the exception of the pharmacy at the hospital, which belongs to the Asociacion Civil Chortitzer Komitee.

== Tourism ==
The tourist office is situated in a traditional building on the main street, north of the cooperative's supermarket. The tourist office screens a film on the founding of the colony daily.

Loma Plata has a museum with an outdoor exhibit of early farming equipment, a typical pioneer house, and a photographic exhibit on the colony's history. Guided tours are given in German, Plattdeutsch, Spanish, and English.

The dairy production company "Trebol" also offers guided tours of their facilities.

Tours are available to the meat workers, Frigochorti. The slaughtering process can be viewed through glass windows as it happens.

The Rodeo Club Isla Po'i, which belongs to the breeders' association in Colonia Menno, annually exhibits on June 12. The exhibit includes developments in agriculture and farming equipment, amongst other sponsors.

== Transportation ==
Loma Plata is accessible via a paved road 22 km long, branching off the Transchaco highway. Nasa and Golondrina provide bus services multiple times a day between Loma Plata and Asuncion. Loma Plata also has a private airport.
