= Anti-Brazilian sentiment =

Hatred or fear of anything Brazilian

Anti-Brazilian sentiment refers to negative feelings, fear, discrimination and hatred towards Brazil, the Brazilian variant of the Portuguese language, Brazilian people or the Brazilian culture.

== By country ==
=== Paraguay ===
Although in Brazil, the Paraguayan War was seen as a legitimate response to Solano López's invasion, in Paraguay there are still reports of resentment towards the conflict. After the end of the war, Brazil annexed parts of the defeated country and occupied its territory until 1876, with many Paraguayan historians blaming Brazil for the country's underdevelopment.

In Paraguay, anti-Brazilian sentiment is also associated with xenophobia and land conflicts involving populations of Brazilian farmers and their descendants (known as Brasiguayos) established in Paraguay, in areas close to the border with Brazil.

=== Portugal ===
Brazilians living in Portugal are the largest foreign community in the European country. However, they are also, according to statistics, among the largest targets for xenophobic attacks. According to data from the Commission for Equality and against Racial Discrimination, of the discrimination complaints received by the Portuguese government between 2017 and 2018, 21.4% were against Roma, followed by blacks (17.3%) and Brazilians. (13%), and the increase was 150% in the number of notifications in the case of the last group.

Reports of attacks against the Brazilian community in Portugal have grown in the 21st century with the increase in the flow of immigrants and are also associated with prejudice against the use of the Brazilian variant of the Portuguese language.

== Derogatory terms ==
=== In Portuguese ===
- Zuca (a contraction of Brazuca) is a derogatory term used in Portugal to refer to Brazilians.

== See also ==
- Brazil–Paraguay relations
- Brasiguayos
- Brazil–Portugal relations
- Lusophobia
- Mongrel complex
- Ellen Lima Wassu
