= Immigration to Paraguay =

Location of Paraguay in South America.

Historically, the migratory history of Paraguay has been ambiguous, since it has had periods of large scale emigration as well as small waves of immigrants, primarily from Europe.

Although the majority of people mostly descended from Native Americans, Paraguay considers itself as a mestizo country, the result of small scale intermarriage with Europeans (mostly of Spanish origin). Unlike neighbouring countries like Argentina or Brazil, Paraguay did not attract massive numbers of immigrants. However, during the 19th century the country suffered a devastating war that greatly reduced its population, having to rise from the ashes and repopulate their territory with large birthrates.

During the 20th century, Paraguay became a recipient of immigrants, especially Europeans fleeing wars occurring in the Old World, in search of a better life and peace. Among European groups in the country, this includes those of Spanish, German (many of them being Mennonites), Italian, French and Slavic origin. Other groups included these of Levantine/Arabs roots (mostly Christian Lebanese and Syrians) and East Asians (such as the Chinese and Japanese), among others.

Today, immigration to Paraguay has not ceased, but the places of origin of the newcomers have changed. According to the 2002 census, 84,2% of immigrants in Paraguay come from Brazil and Argentina.

== History ==
The first Europeans to arrive in what is now Paraguayan territory were Spaniards who left a palpable cultural heritage even today.

The government of Carlos Antonio López was marked by a period of international openness including immigration and attracting settlers to populate the country.

=== Settlement in the Paraguayan Chaco ===
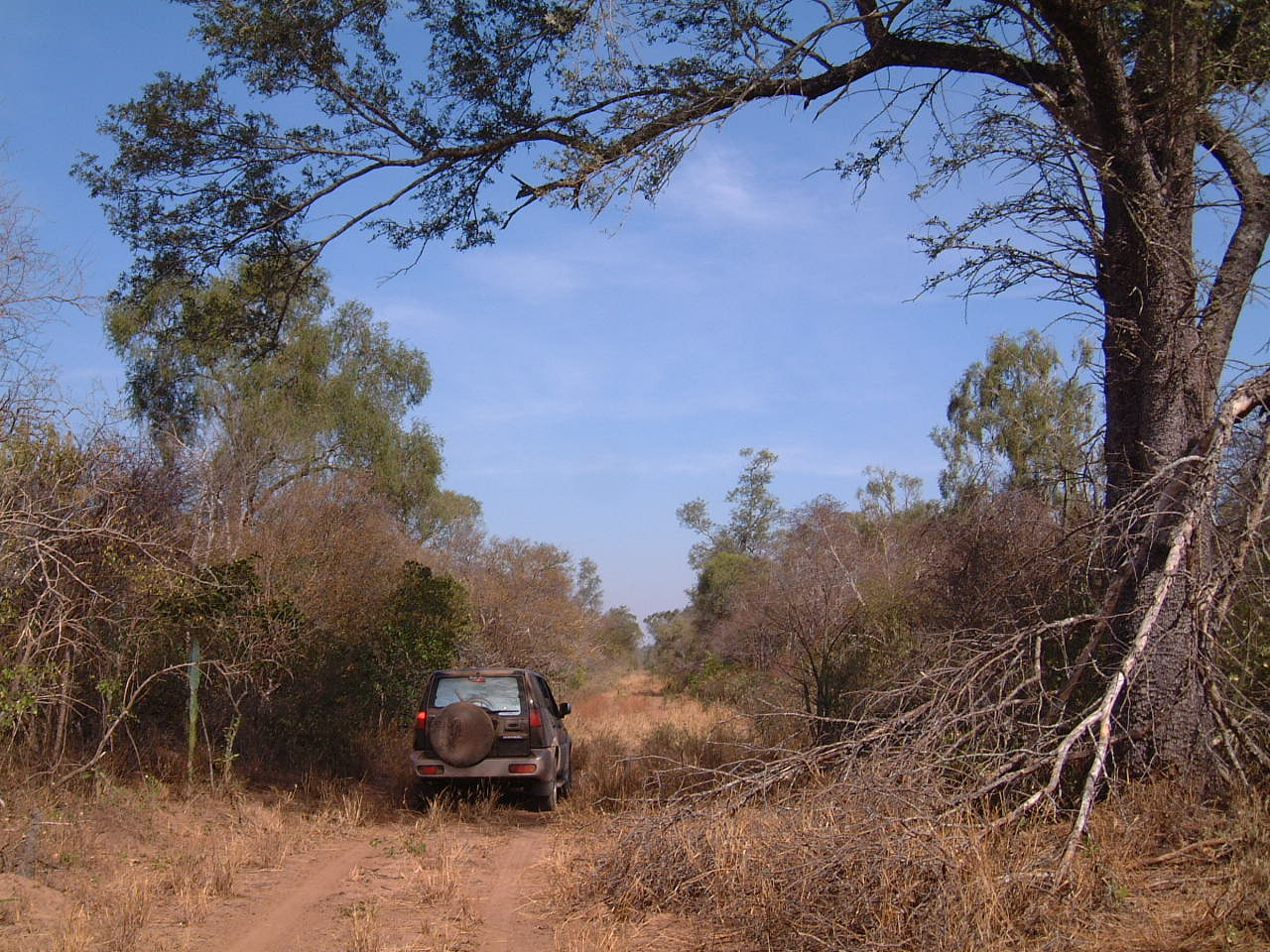
Chaco region in Paraguay during the dry season.

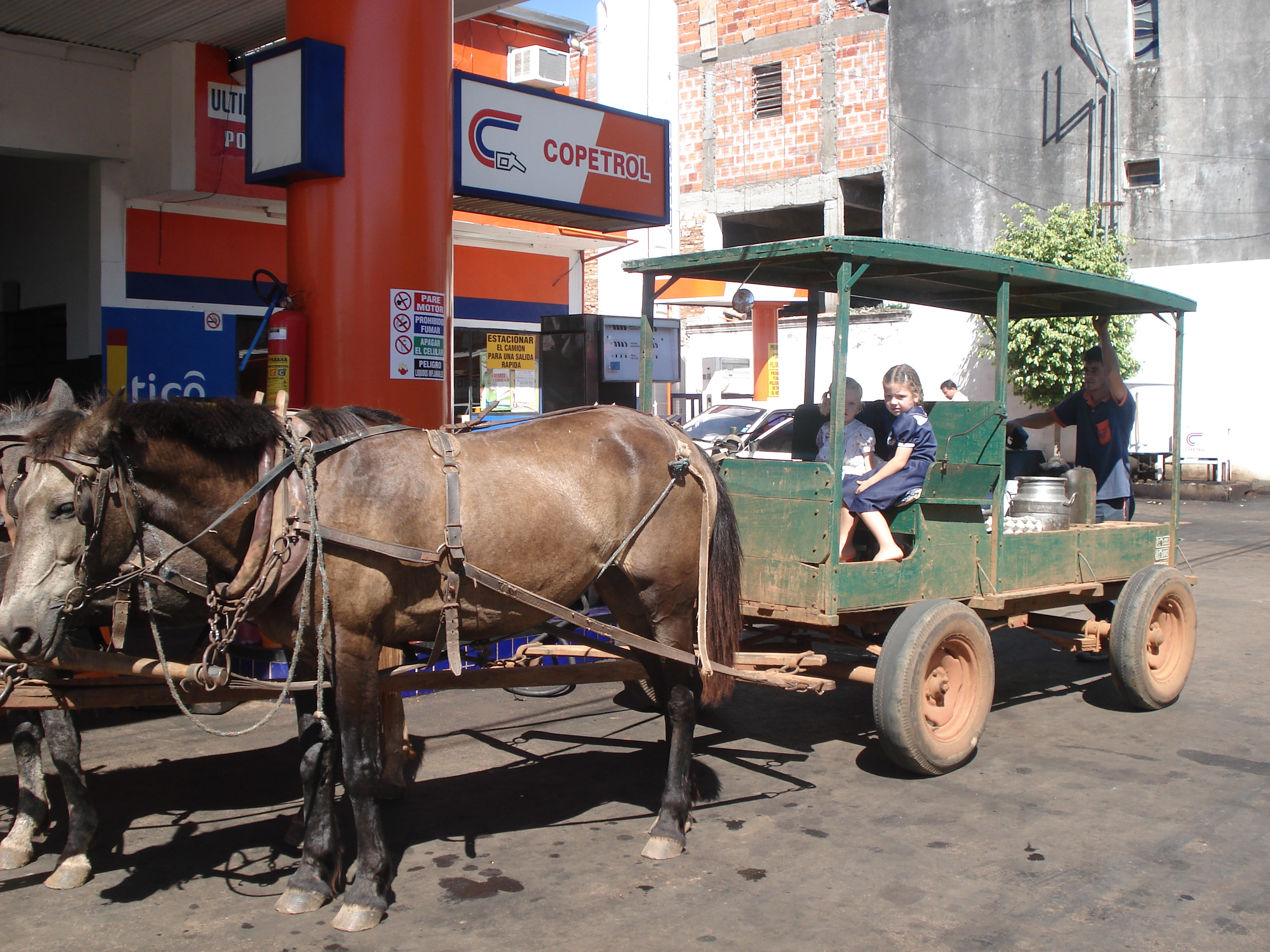
Mennonite children in a petrol station in Paraguay.

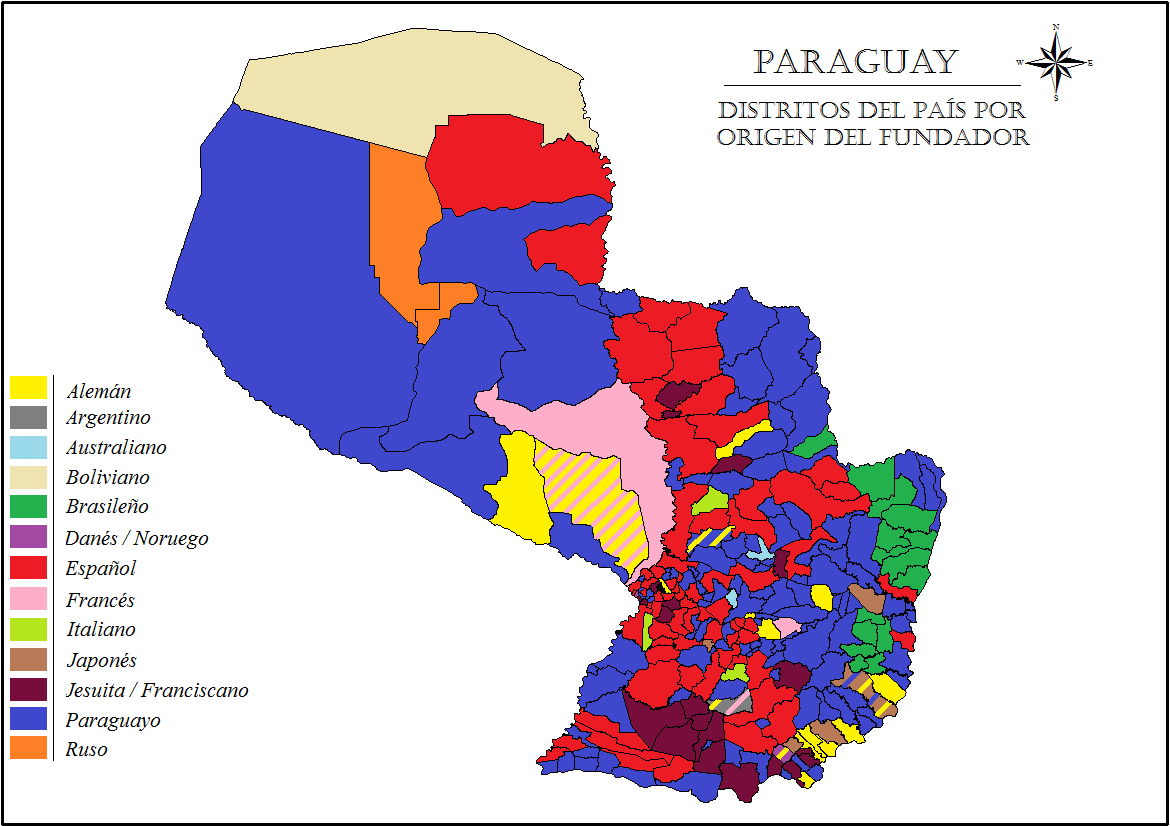
Map of Paraguay indicating the origin of the founders of the different districts in the country by colour.

Geographically, Paraguay can be divided into two parts: The Chaco or Western Region, and the Eastern Region, where Asunción is located, as well as the other main cities of the country.

The Chaco is the largest region by area with about 60% of the total territory but, on the other hand, it is the least populated region being home to less than 2% of the total population. Because of this, one of the main goals of the government of Paraguay was to populate this vast and immense region, which comprises the departments of Presidente Hayes, Boquerón, and Alto Paraguay (also known in English as Upper Paraguay).

The colonisation of the Chaco began with the founding of several colonies, including Nueva Burdeos (French: Nouvelle-Bordeaux, present-day Villa Hayes), which was founded by French immigrants. The first settlers came to this colony through the port of Asunción in 1856. In the years 1927, 1930 and 1947, three waves of German-speaking Mennonites originally Russia came from Canada and the Soviet Union to the Chaco and started three colonies there. In the 2020s about a third of the Chaco population belongs to these Chaco Mennonites who are an important part of the population of Mennonites in Paraguay.

== Figures ==
The table below obviously only shows the official numbers in individual immigrants. Most of the often German Brasiguayos, who came as early as around the year 1900 are not included. Also some 8,300 German speaking Mennonites who came from Canada in 1927 (1,778 people) and from Russia in 1930 and 1932 (ca. 2,000) and in 1947 (ca. 4,500 via Germany) are not in the table.

Place of origin	1870-1879	1880-1889	1890-1899	1900-1909	1910-1919	1920-1929	1930-1939	1940-1949	1950-1959
Paraguayan returnees	0	0	0	51	193	105	111	0	0
Argentina	0	4,895	18	364	1,122	100	141	512	2,036
Brazil	0	530	0	29	44	0	12	77	474
Uruguay	0	198	0	59	68	40	12	43	188
Bolivia	0	0	0	4	0	0	8	13	75
United States	0	0	6	37	3	35	9	60	385
Canada	0	0	0	0	0	1	0	20	99
Rest of the Americas	0	0	0	2	4	0	5	36	136
Total from the Americas	0	5,623	24	546	1,434	281	298	671	3,393
Italy	0	824	251	1,115	973	37	41	238	580
Spain	0	321	9	809	1,494	37	73	159	1,287
France	0	228	10	124	111	15	109	63	148
Germany	0	467	11	479	811	814	1,038	186	661
United Kingdom	800	39	28	35	31	9	8	84	160
Austria	0	0	1	122	318	137	533	50	32
Russia	0	53	0	99	252	46	515	288	319
Belgium	0	0	0	15	46	14	12	168	80
Switzerland	0	0	3	22	85	137	96	30	38
Czech Republic	0	0	0	0	0	44	527	126	90
Poland	0	0	0	0	0	34	8,079	461	188
Rest of Europe	0	146	0	14	14	44	332	279	480
Total from Europe	800	2,078	313	2,834	4,135	1,368	11,363	2,132	4,063
Syria; Lebanon	0	0	0	0	0	2	52	17	75
Rest of the Western Asia	0	0	0	15	4	2	2	3	0
Total from Western Asia	0	0	0	15	4	4	54	20	75
Japan	0	0	0	25	0	0	533	161	4,085
Rest of East Asia	0	73	78	0	127	0	0	18	72
Total from East Asia	0	73	78	0	127	0	0	18	4,157
Mennonites	0	0	0	0	0	1,876	381	4,258	7
Total of immigrants	0-800	4,808-7,774	415-3,743	3,420-7,115	5,700-6,306	3,264-3,529	12,629-20,141	7,280-7,555	10,044-11,665
Paraguayan population	?	239,774	?	490,719	651,040	843,905	987,824	1,259,826	1,816,890

== See also ==
- Demographics of Paraguay
