= Mennonites in Paraguay =

Religious denomination

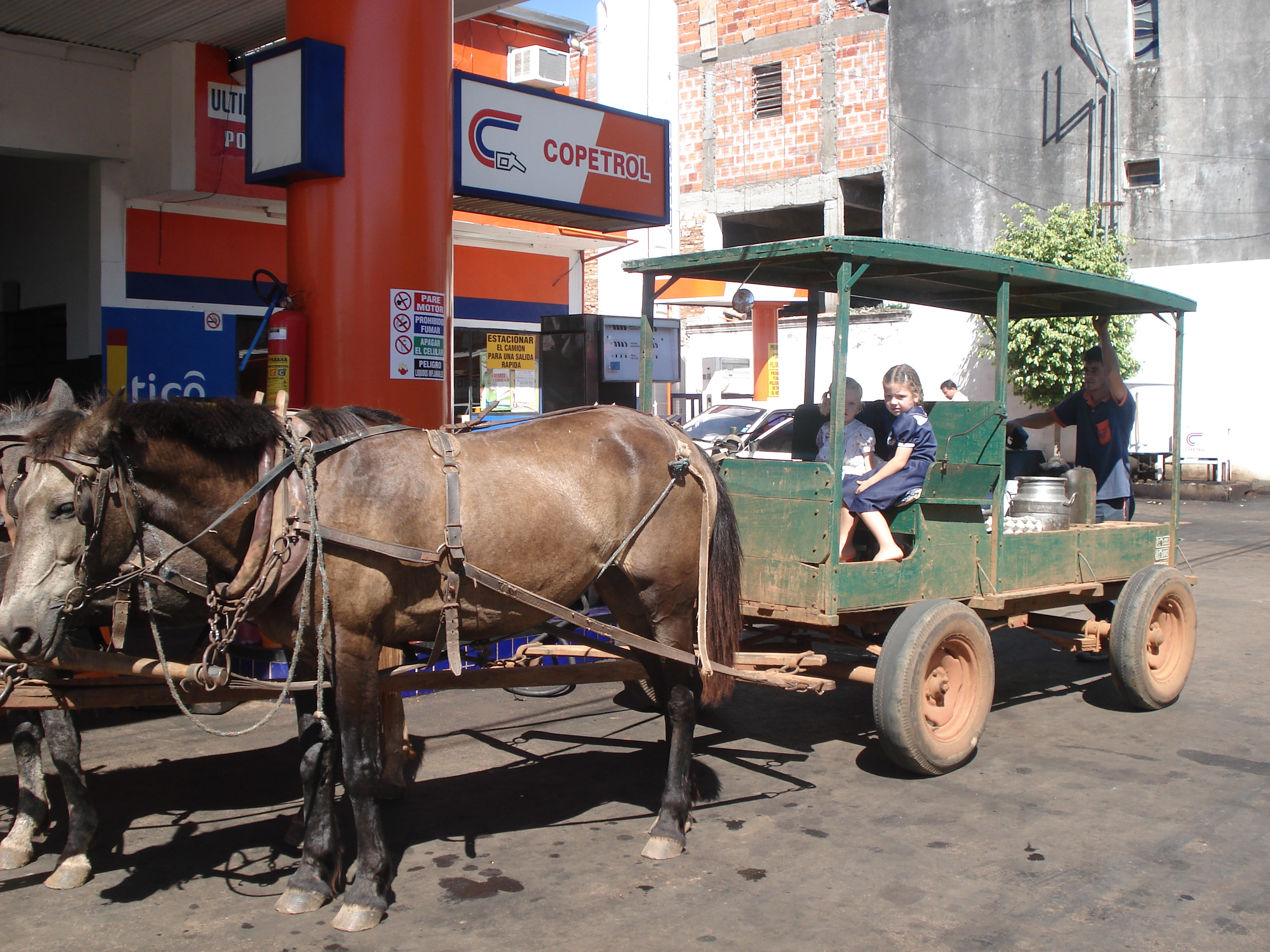
- Mennonite children in San Juan Bautista

Total population
- 38,731 (2022)

Regions with significant populations
- Boquerón Department (Menno Colony, Neuland Colony, Filadelfia, etc.)

Religions
- Anabaptist

Scriptures
- Bible

Languages
- Plautdietsch, Standard German, Spanish, English

Mennonites in Paraguay are either Plautdietsch-speakers of mostly Flemish, Frisian and Prussian ancestry or, like the majority of Paraguayans, of mixed (southern European/Amerindian) or Amerindian ancestry. Ethnic Mennonites contribute heavily to the agricultural and dairy output of Paraguay.

== History ==
In the 1780s, Catherine the Great of Russia invited Mennonites from Prussia to settle north of the Black Sea in exchange for religious freedom and exemption from military service, a precondition founded in their commitment to non-violence. After Russia introduced the general conscription in 1874, many Mennonites migrated to the US and Canada. The members of the Menno Colony moved to Paraguay from Canada when universal, secular compulsory education was implemented in 1917 that required the use of the English language. More conservative Mennonites saw this as a threat to the religious basis of their community. In 1927, 1743 pioneers came from Canada to Paraguay and turned the arid Chaco into fertile farmland over the years. It was the first Mennonite colony in the region.

In the beginning, the pioneers in the Chaco had to overcome many adversities. Many became sick due to the lack of medical care, of whom 121 died and some 60 families returned to Canada.

In 1930, another wave of Russian Mennonite immigrants arrived in the Chaco area from Russia (mostly via a temporary stop in Germany) and founded the Fernheim Colony. They were fleeing the persecution by the Communists and a bad economic situation that was caused by the collectivization in the Soviet Union and eventually led to the Holodomor. More Russian Mennonites fled to the west with the receding German Army at the end of WW2 fearing persecution, Russian forced labor camps and deportation. Some 3,500 of these Mennonites arrived in Paraguay and founded Neuland and Volendam colonies in 1947.

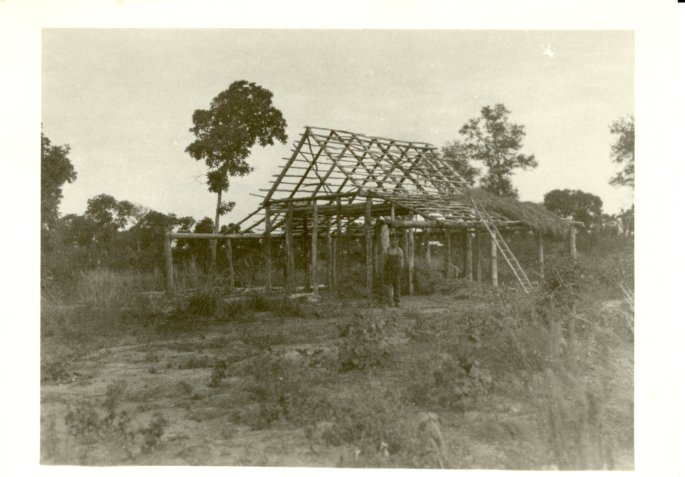
The appearance of the first houses built by the Mennonites.

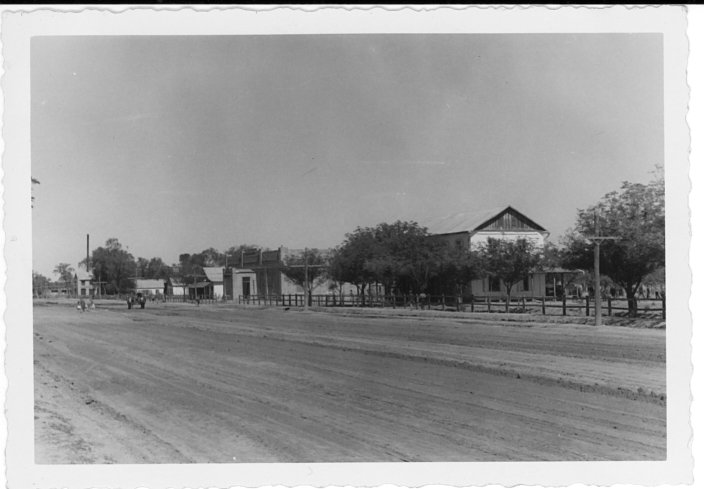
Colony of Filadelfia, 1949.

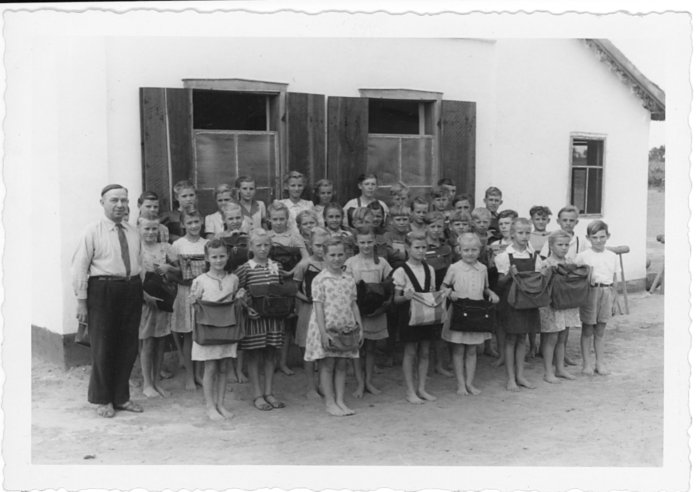
Mennonite school children In Paraguay, 1949.

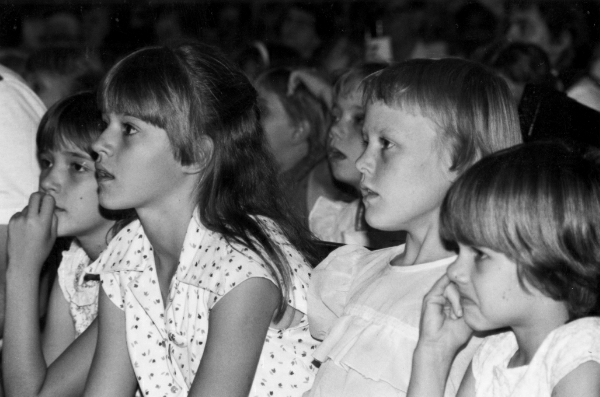
Girls from Fernheim Colony, 1987.

== Origin and languages ==
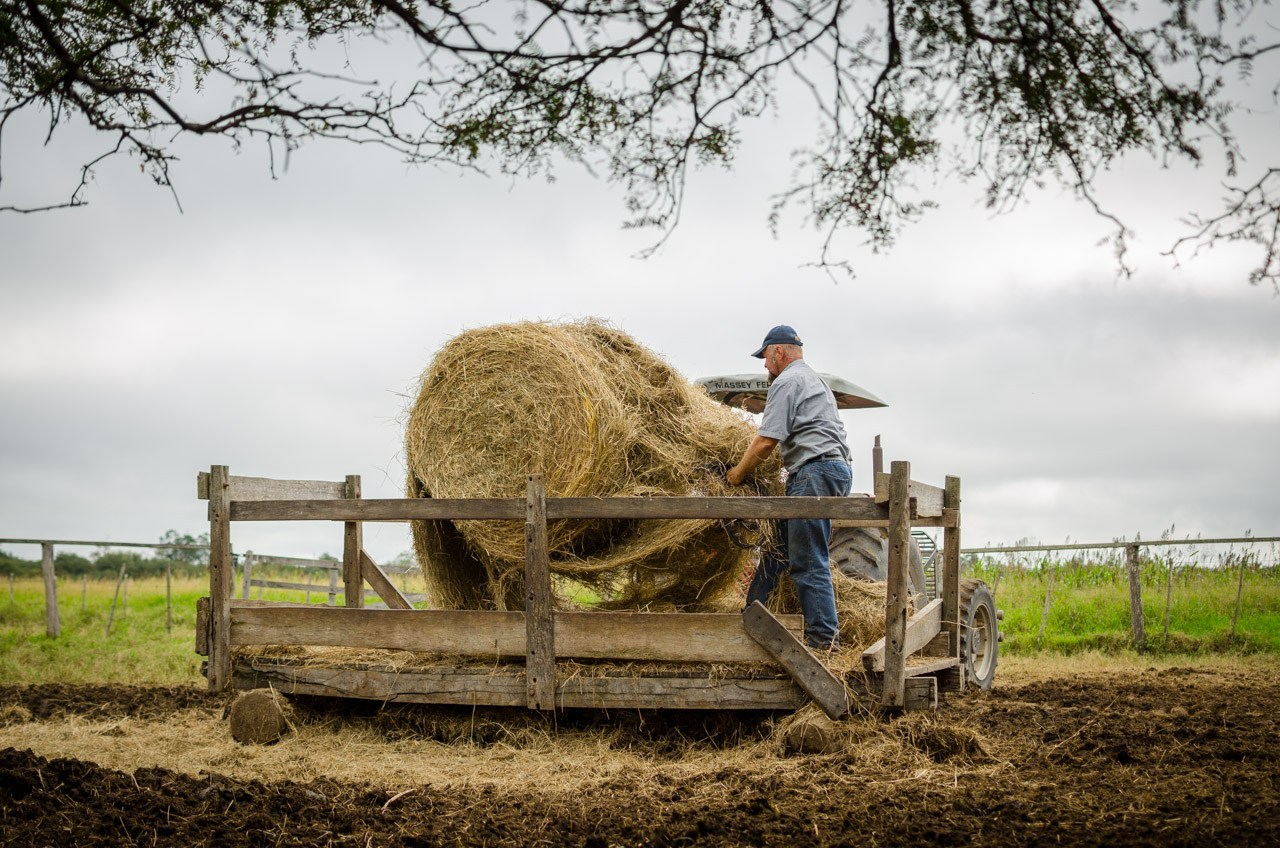
A mennonite farmer unrolls hay to feed the cows at his farm located near Lolita, Chaco.

The vast majority of Mennonites in Paraguay, spread out over nineteen colonies across Paraguay, are of the Russian Mennonite variety, meaning they are originally of Dutch ancestry and can trace their history to the Mennonite settlement in the Vistula Delta, from where they migrated to the Russian Empire and later to the Americas. The percentage of the Mennonites of Paraguay who came directly from Russia is 25 percent. 51 percent came from Russia via Canada, where they lived for several decades and a further 22% from Russia via Canada via Mexico (some from Mexico via Belize).

Smaller groups of Swiss German or Old Order Amish also exist in Paraguay, making up about two percent, and are descendants of Amish immigrants from the United States, who came originally from Switzerland and Southern Germany.

The Russian Mennonite majority share a common ancestry, Plautdietsch language, and many other traditions, which are quite distinct from the small group of Amish Mennonite in Paraguay, who speak Pennsylvania German along with English.

== Demography ==
Historical population
Year	Pop.	±%
1927	1,743	—
1940	4,354	+149.8%
1950	12,001	+175.6%
1956	13,040	+8.7%
1987	22,710	+74.2%
2000	29,045	+27.9%
2008	30,000	+3.3%
2022	38,731	+29.1%

There were 22,710 ethnic Mennonites living in Paraguay in 1987 and 29,045 in 2000. Plautdietsch speakers were estimated 40,000 in 2007 according to Ethnologue.

== Major colonies ==
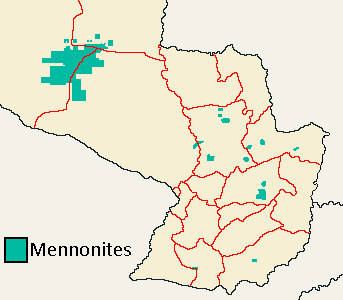
Map of Mennonite colonies in Paraguay

A 2020 survey found that there are more than 200 Mennonite colonies across 9 Latin American countries, with 25 in Paraguay alone.

Mennonite colonies are located in two quite different parts of Paraguay with quite different clime and natural resources: in the hot and dry Gran Chaco region (West), and the milder and more humid Eastern Paraguay. When calculating the population of Mennonites, sometimes only adult baptized members are counted, but here every Mennonite (i.e. baptized adult members, baptized young people and children who live in the colonies) is included.

Name	Location	Founded	Origin	1987 Population	2022 Population
Menno	West	1927	Canada	6,650	10,700
Fernheim	West	1930	USSR/Canada	3,240	4,984
Friesland	East	1937	USSR/Canada	720	672
Neuland	West	1947	USSR/Canada	1,330	2,347
Volendam	East	1947	USSR/Canada	690	710
Asuncion	East	1947	Diverse	750	1,550
Bergthal	East	1948	Canada	1,490	3,823
Sommerfeld	East	1948	Canada	1,860	4,963
Reinfeld	East	1966	Canada	120	365
Luz y Esperanza*	East	1967	USA	110	158
Agua Azul*	East	1969	USA	170	ca. 60
Rio Verde	East	1969	Mexico	2,490	3,600
Tres Palmas	East	1970	Canada/USSR	220	186
Santa Clara	East	1972	Mexico	130	302
Río Corrientes*	East	1975	USA	167	Ended ca. 1995
Florida*	East	1976	USA	100	116
Nueva Durango	East	1978	Mexico	2,050	2,410
Campo Alto*	East	1980	Belize	55	Ended ca. 1995
La Montaña*	East	1982	USA	70	325
Manitoba	East	1983	Mexico	290	1,269
Madelón	West	2013	Durango, PY	0	360
Monte Claro	West	2017	Rio Verde, PY	0	373
Paraguay				22,710	38,731

* Colonies of English-speaking Mennonites of South German origin and Spanish-speaking Mennonites of diverse origins like Beachy Amish and Conservative Mennonites

== Mennonites of the Central Chaco ==
The Central Chaco region probably has the highest concentration of ethnic Mennonites anywhere in Latin America. German speaking people (almost all of them Mennonites) formed 32% of the total population of the Central Chaco as of 2005. Only Paraguayan Indians (52%) were more numerous compared to them. Latin Paraguayans, the majority ethnic group in Paraguay, constituted just 11% and Braziguayans and Argentines another 5%.

Mennonites have received some criticism from human rights organizations for their relations with a number of indigenous tribes, including the Ayoreo people in Paraguay.

== See also ==
- Immigration to Paraguay
- Religion in Paraguay
- Mennonites in Argentina
- Mennonites in Bolivia – Religious denomination in South America
- Mennonites in Uruguay

== Bibliography ==
- Gerhard Ratzlaff et al.: Lexikon der Mennoniten in Paraguay. Asunción 2009.
- Peter Klassen: Die Mennoniten in Paraguay : Reich Gottes und Reich dieser Welt. Bolanden 1988.
- Hendrik Hack: Die Kolonisation der Mennoniten im paraguayischen Chaco. Den Haag 1961.
