= Chaco Basin =

Sedimentary basin in South America

- Cuenca Chaco, Cuenca Chaco Paranaense
- Location of the basin in South America
- Coordinates: 25°S 60°W
- Etymology: Chaco
- Location: Central South America
- Region: Gran Chaco; Paraná Basin
- Country: Argentina; Bolivia; Paraguay
- States: Chaco, Formosa; Chuquisaca, Santa Cruz, Tarija; Alto Paraguay, Boquerón
- Cities: Filadelfia

Characteristics
- On/Offshore: Onshore
- Boundaries: Andes
- Part of: Andean foreland basins

Hydrology
- Rivers: Paraguay, Paraná

Geology
- Basin type: Foreland basin
- Orogeny: Andean
- Age: Paleozoic-Holocene
- Stratigraphy: Stratigraphy

The Chaco Basin (Spanish: Cuenca Chaco, Spanish: Cuenca Chaco Paranaense or Spanish: Cuenca Chaco-Paraná) is a major sedimentary basin in Central South America around the borders of Argentina, Bolivia and Paraguay. The basin forms part of the larger Paraná Basin. Superficially, the Chaco Basin is an alluvial basin composed of land-derived (in contrast to marine sediments) material, mostly fine sand and clays of Paleogene, Neogene and Quaternary age. On deeper levels the Paraguayan Chaco is made up by four sub-basins, the Pirizal, Pilar, Carandaity and Curupaity basins.

== Stratigraphy ==
The basin is part of the megaregional Paraná Basin, of which it occupies its western portion. The basin is subdivided into the Western Chaco (Chaco Occidental) and Eastern Chaco (Chaco Oriental). The Paleozoic stratigraphy of the Chaco Basin comprises the Middle to Late Carboniferous Sachayoj Formation, the Late Carboniferous Charata Formation and the Early Permian Chacabuco Formation. The Neogene cover contains the Late Miocene Paraná Formation, the Late Pleistocene (Lujanian in the SALMA classification) Chaco Formation, also described as Eocene to Miocene, and the substratum-forming Fortín Tres Pozos Formation in the Formosa Province of northern Argentina.
