= Doctor Pedro P. Peña =

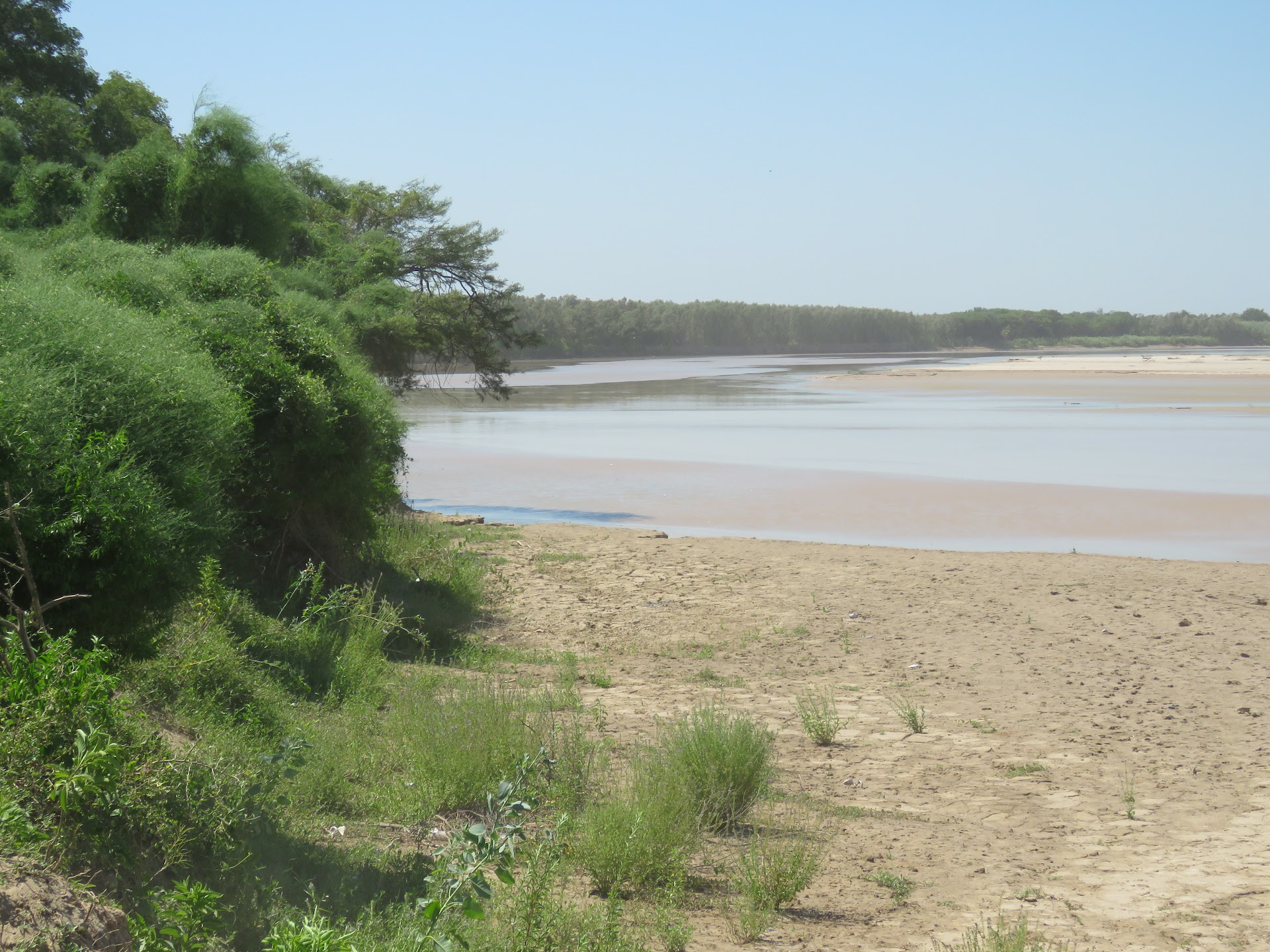
- The Pilcomayo River near Pedro Peña, Paraguay

- Location within Paraguay
- Coordinates: 22°28′48″S 62°18′0″W
- Country: Paraguay
- Department: Boquerón

Population (2008)
  - Total: 6 143

Doctor Pedro P. Peña is a village at the Argentina–Paraguay border, in the Boquerón department of Paraguay. It used to be the capital of Boquerón until 1992, when Filadelfia became capital.

At around 2006, the Pilcomayo River changed its path and destroyed most of Dr. Pedro P. Peña. The village was abandoned after the incident. The mission P. P. Peña moved approx. 8 km north.

== Sources ==
- World Gazeteer: Paraguay – World-Gazetteer.com
