= Menno Colony =

Coordinates: 22.51°S 60.01°W

- Location within Paraguay
- Country: Paraguay
- Department: Boquerón

Population (2022)
  - Total: 10,700

Menno Colony is a Mennonite settlement located in the central part of the Chaco region, in northwest Paraguay, occupying an area of 7500 km^{2} (2900 mi^{2}). It was founded in 1926 by Plautdietsch-speaking descendants of Russian Mennonites who emigrated from Canadian provinces of Manitoba and Saskatchewan. Neighbouring Mennonite settlements are Fernheim Colony and Neuland Colony. The main settlement of the colony is Loma Plata. Menno is the largest of the Mennonite colonies in Paraguay.

== History ==
The 10,000 residents are Mennonites of Prussian and Dutch background. The ancestors of these Mennonites originated in the Dutch speaking Low Countries and lived in Vistula Delta region of Poland until the end of the 18th century, in the Black Sea region of Ukraine until 1874 and in Manitoba, Canada, until 1926, before settling in Paraguay. Loma Plata with a population of about 3500 is the largest town within the colony and is the administrative centre. The emigration from Canada to Paraguay was a reaction to the introduction of universal, secular compulsory education in 1917 requiring the use of the English language, which the more conservative Mennonites saw as a threat to the religious basis of their community.

A second impetus was the Canadian settlement act, which prevented the form of cooperative farming that was practised in Russia. In 1919 a delegation was sent to South America to find a new home. The Paraguayan state was interested in opening the vast undeveloped Chaco to industrious settlers and made a considerable number of concessions to the delegation. Concessions included freedom from military service, the right to run their own German language schools, a far reaching guarantee to autonomously manage their own affairs within the jurisdiction of the colony without government interference, absolute religious freedom and an open immigration policy allowing more Mennonites settlers. The Mennonites bought the necessary land at an inflated price from the Argentine firm Casado, one of the largest landholders in the Chaco. 1743 settlers came to Paraguay from Canada in 1927.

In the 1950s, there was an exodus back to Canada because of unfavourable living conditions and in response to the conservatism of the colony. In the past decade, Menno has had a rapidly developing economy and good public image. Canadian Mennonites are returning and the colony is also an attraction to Paraguayans outside the Mennonite colonies.

== Economy ==
For a long time, the life of Mennonites in the Chaco was marked by extreme deprivation as a result of the new arrivals' complete lack of agricultural experience under tropical conditions. The relationship between the climate and the earth, especially the dryness of the winter months, turned out to be more extreme than the writing of the Paraguayan promoters had led them to believe. These circumstances were made even more difficult by voluntarily doing without modern agricultural equipment. Marketing products was extremely challenging because of the isolated location of the colony and as a result, most economic activity was related to subsistence farming.

An economic upswing in the central Chaco began in the 1980s when the agricultural co-operative, with the help of World Bank credits, invested in dairy production. The introduction of the drought- and heat-resistant buffalo grass from North America in 1955, which created the foundation of an extensive cattle industry, and the construction of the Trans-Chaco Highway to Asunción in 1965 were significant predecessors to economic growth. An important factor in the economic improvement was the reform of the school system and a general liberalisation.

== Population ==
Historical population
Year	Pop.	±%
1928	1,303	—
1956	4,333	+232.5%
1987	6,650	+53.5%
2014	10,000	+50.4%
2022	10,700	+7.0%

In 1928 the number of Mennonites who settled in Menno was 1,303. In 1956 it had grown to 4,333 and in 1987 to 6,650. In 2014 the population stood at about 10,000. There were not many people who left the colony, the ones who did so, left mainly in the first years and then again starting in the 1950s.

== Indigenous people ==
Lengua Indians lived in the area where the Mennonites settled. There were originally about 600 Lengua and the number has grown considerably since the founding of Menno Colony. Because of improved living conditions and exceptionally good relations between the original inhabitants and the Mennonite settlers, Menno and the neighbouring settlements attracted other native groups. For the social and economic advancement of the indigenous population the Mennonites established a service co-operative, Asociación de Servicios de Cooperación Indígena Mennonita (ASCIM) in 1961.

ASCIM has 300 members, of which half are Mennonites and half indigenous. The governing board of the non-profit association consists of 30 indigenous and 32 non-indigenous representatives. The number of indigenous residents is now about 25,000 and growing, numbering more than the Mennonite population. Although Mennonites and indigenous people have worked closely together for a long time and some of the latter learnt to speak the Plautdietsch language of the settlers, further mixing of the two cultures has not occurred. Christian mission work among the indigenous groups often becomes a competition between the missionary effort of the Mennonites and the Paraguayan Roman Catholic missionaries.

== Bibliography ==
- Gerhard Ratzlaff et al.: Lexikon der Mennoniten in Paraguay. Asunción 2009.
- Peter Klassen: Die Mennoniten in Paraguay : Reich Gottes und Reich dieser Welt. Bolanden 1988.
- Hendrik Hack: Die Kolonisation der Mennoniten im paraguayischen Chaco. Den Haag 1961.
