= Ellen Lima Wassu =

Brazilian indigenous writer and thinker

- Citizenship: Brazilian
- Notable work: Ixé ygara voltando pra 'y'kûá

Ellen Lima Wassu is a Brazilian indigenous writer and thinker from the Wassu Cocal people in Alagoas.

== Biography ==
Lima Wassu was born in Rio de Janeiro. Having a master's degree in art history, in 2021 she published Ixé ygara voltando pra 'y'kûá through the Urutau publishing house. The book, written in Portuguese and Old Tupi, addresses issues she had faced throughout her life. Lima Wassu also contributed to Volta para tua terra, an anthology of anti-fascist and anti-racist poets in Portugal. As of 2023, she was pursuing a doctoral degree in Postcolonial Studies at the University of Minho.

== See also ==
- Tupinizando
