= Fernheim Colony =

Settlement of Russian Mennonites in Paraguay

Coordinates: 22°20′24″S 60°01′48″W

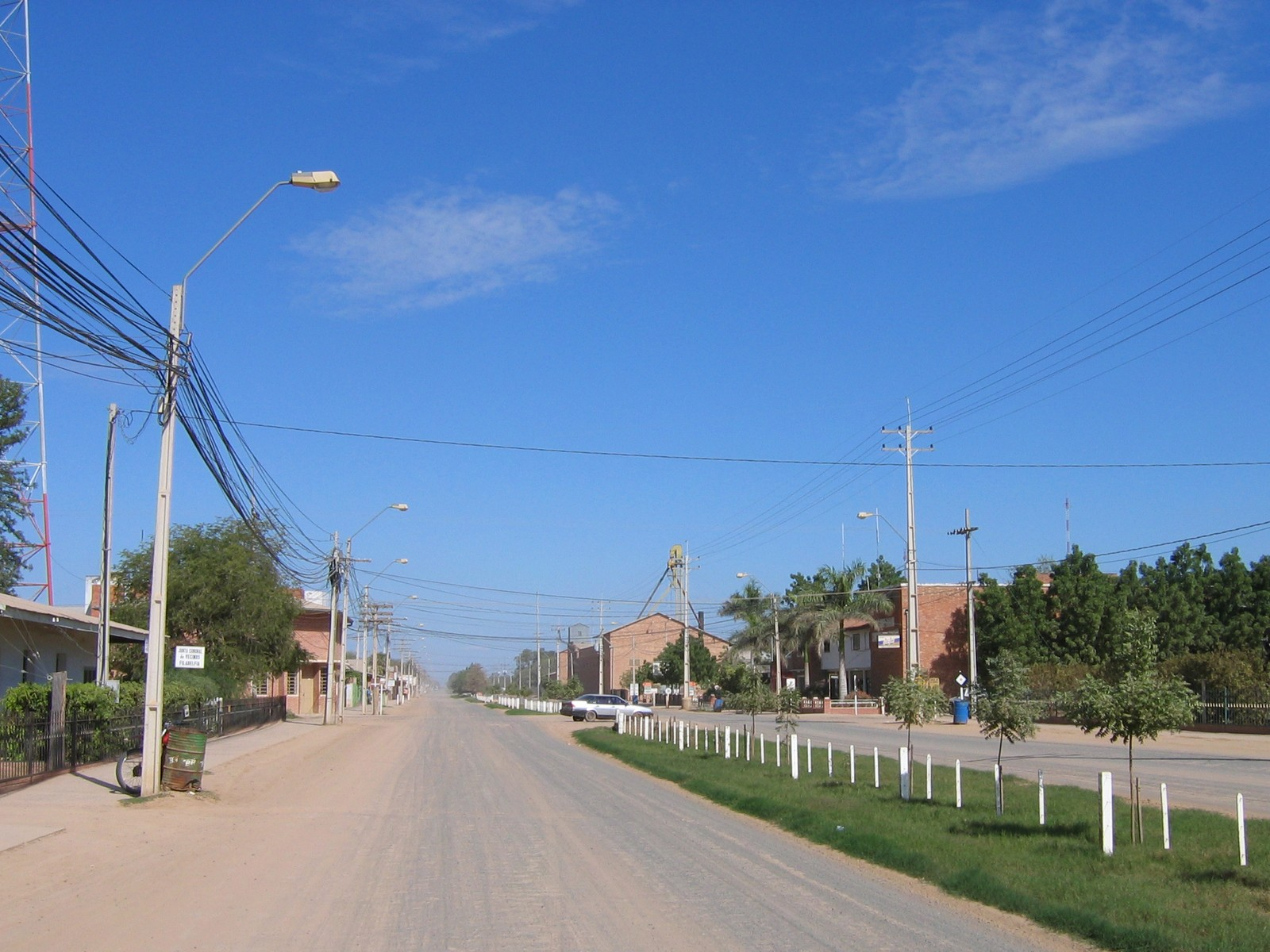
Main road of Filadelfia

The Fernheim Colony is a Plautdietsch-speaking settlement of Mennonites originally from Russia of about 5000 in the Chaco of Paraguay. Mennonites from the Soviet Union founded it between 1930 and 1932. Filadelfia is the administrative center of the colony, seat of Boquerón department and is considered the 'Capital of the Chaco'. Fernheim is the second Mennonite colony in Paraguay, after Menno Colony.

In the late 1920s, some Russian Mennonites decided to escape persecution of "Kulaks" in Stalinist Russia, which meant the total destruction of the Mennonite religious and cultural life. They left their villages and gathered in Moscow. For humanitarian reasons they were admitted into Germany, because of their German ethnicity that they had adopted during their 200- to 250-year stay in German-speaking lands, even though most of their ancestors came from Flanders and Frisia. Because there was no place in Germany where they could settle together as a community, they moved to Paraguay a year later. There already was a large settlement of Russian Mennonites in Paraguay: Menno Colony. This first Mennonite settlement in the Chaco was founded by conservative Chortitza, Sommerfeld and Bergthal Mennonites from Canada in the 1920s. The Mennonite refugees from the Soviet Union settled nearby, founding Fernheim Colony.

The journey to Paraguay was extremely difficult. Their destination in the Chaco, set aside by Paraguayan government decree, was completely undeveloped. They traveled by steamboat up the Paraguay River from Asunción to Puerto Casado, from where they boarded a narrow gauge railway and traveled 150 kilometres (93 mi) west into the Chaco region. From there it was a few more days of travel by oxcart to their settlement area. It was not until 1956 that the construction of the trans-Chaco highway connecting Asunción to Filadelfia was started.

The economic base of Fernheim is agriculture and processing of agricultural products. The most important products are cotton, peanuts, beef, milk and dairy products.

== See also ==
- Mennonites in Paraguay
