= Neuland Colony =

Neuland Vokerón (Guarani) Nielaunt, Newland
- Location in Paraguay
- Coordinates: 22°38′59″S 60°7′48″W
- Country: Paraguay
- Department: Boquerón
- Foundation: April 26, 1947

Area
  - Total: 36,367 km^{2} (14,041 sq mi)
- Elevation: 122 m (400 ft)

Population (2008)
  - Total: 3,400
- Time zone: UTC-04 (AST)
  - Summer (DST): UTC-03 (ADT)
- Postal code: 9100

Nielaunt (Plautdietsch pronunciation: [ˈnilɔnt]; Guarani: Vokerón) is a Mennonite settlement in Paraguay. After thousands of Plautdietsch-speaking Russian Mennonites fled the Soviet Union during the Great Trek of World War II, many were left displaced by the war. In response to this need, land in the Boquerón Department was purchased by the Mennonite Central Committee in 1947 and settled by these same Mennonite refugees from Europe.

The site is near Filadelfia, the capital of Boquerón, and not far from neighbouring Presidente Hayes Department. Neuland is located within the Gran Chaco and features, among other things, a museum of colonization history and a monument commemorating the Chaco War.

The monthly newspaper Neuland – Informiert und Diskutiert is one of several German-language newspapers in Paraguay.

== Etymology ==
Its name, which means "New Land," reflects its founding by settlers of German origin. It is the youngest of the Mennonite colonies.

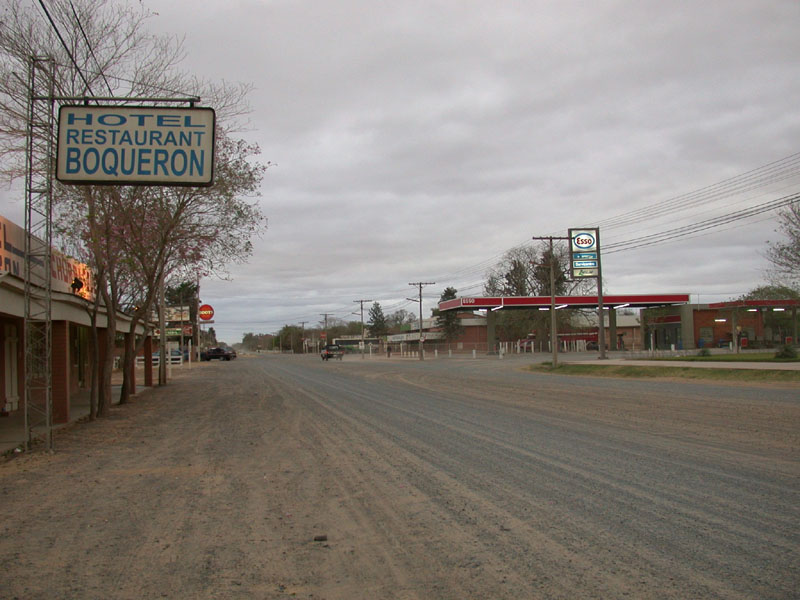
Main street, Neuland

== Climate ==
The climate is tropical, with summer temperatures reaching up to 45°C (113°F) and winter lows of around 9°C (48°F). The average temperature is 25°C (77°F). The region experiences long periods of drought followed by torrential rains.

== Geography ==
The terrain is mostly flat, not exceeding 300 meters (980 feet) above sea level, with occasional undulations. These areas provide fertile land for agriculture and animal husbandry.

It is close to Filadelfia, the capital of Boquerón Department, and not far from Presidente Hayes Department. Neuland is located within the Gran Chaco.

== History and tourism ==
It has a Museum of the History of Colonization and a monument commemorating the Chaco War (1932–1935).

The monthly Neuland informiert und diskutiert is one of several German-language newspapers in Paraguay. In May, the Rodeo Neuland takes place.

The Professional School Neuland receives support from the Ministry of Agriculture of Bavaria, Germany. Many technicians are trained there and subsequently apply their knowledge in the region.

The district includes Fort Boquerón, where the first decisive battle of the Chaco War took place on September 29, 1932. A statue, designed by Hermann Guggiari, stands at the site. Visitors can also appreciate exhibits about the beginnings of the colony and the work of the first settlers of Neuland.

The Public Relations Department of Cooperative Neuland is developing an educational tourism program to showcase ethnic interactions, historical battle sites from the Chaco War, nature reserves, and the region's flora and fauna. The program also includes stays with locals and other tourist attractions. Visitors can explore the rich and diverse flora and fauna of the Chaco during their tours of the area and nature reserves.

The Chaco ecosystem is very sensitive, so mass tourism is not recommended. Instead, ecotourism is encouraged as an educational approach.

Amistad Park is maintained in the same condition as the Chaco was 60 years ago.

Cooperative Neuland, aware of the growing tourist interest in the area and recognizing the importance of improving infrastructure to accommodate visitors, is steadily working to implement attractive projects.

== Transportation ==
It can be reached from Lagerenza by taking a detour from Route PY09, also known as Ruta Transchaco, to Cruce Pioneros at km 413, and then continuing along a road in very good condition.

== Education and culture ==
In Neuland, culture and education are highly valued, with music and song standing out among the major art forms. The prestigious Youth Symphony Orchestra features musicians instructed by international artists. In 1993, the music education center was established to train future musicians and organize rehearsals and presentations of works, including classical music and folk traditions from various cultures that converge in the region.

The Joy Choir is composed of people with certain ailments or those recently integrated into society, as well as seniors. It serves as both therapy and a form of distraction. In hospitals, the choir provides encouragement to patients in difficult situations. The choir was established based on the recommendation of doctors at Hospital Neuland.

Another major concern for Neuland is education. The first settlers prioritized education even before building their houses. Often, classes were held in the shade of trees. For the settlers, education was considered the best investment they could make.

Regarding infrastructure, primary and secondary educational institutions are equipped with modern classrooms, laboratories, and workshops for practical work and testing. Education is compulsory until ninth grade. Students from schools and colleges in the villages and town center are transported by a school bus managed by the Cooperative.

Regarding university education, the Cooperative awards scholarships for studies in Asunción or abroad to individuals who have completed their university studies. Recipients are expected to contribute to the community by providing development assistance upon completing their education.

Training is also a key focus for Neuland. Vocational training institutions have been established to prepare individuals for various professions, including farming, dairy farming, carpentry, mechanics, secretarial work, and accounting. Additionally, there are teacher training programs that prepare future educators to teach in primary schools across the country.

== Economy ==
After overcoming several challenges, Neuland has become a thriving community. It is an agricultural area where peanuts, cotton, sorghum, and sesame are grown. It is also an important region for livestock production, including cattle for meat and dairy.

== Health ==
The Concordia Neuland Hospital is equipped with modern facilities, including operating rooms, a pharmacy, and ambulances, providing comprehensive care for patients.

Members of the Cooperative have the option to join a health insurance plan through the hospital. The hospital has staff on call to attend to patients.

The hospital also offers guidance in health, education, family matters, spirituality, and services for the disabled, orphans, adolescents, and those who are ill.

As the Mennonite colony progressed, there was migration of the indigenous population to the colonies, where they receive education, medical care, and economic support.
