= Route 9 (Paraguay) =

Route in Paraguay

National Route 09
- Ruta nacional PY09
- Dr. Carlos Antonio López (Transchaco)
- PY09 highlighted in red.

Route information
- Length: 835 km (519 mi)

Major junctions
- South end: José Falcón
- North end: Fortín Sgto. Rodríguez

Location
- Country: Paraguay

Highway system
- Highways in Paraguay

National Route 9 (in Spanish, Ruta Nacional PY09, better known as Ruta Transchaco) is a national highway that crosses the Paraguayan Chaco, crossing the departments of Presidente Hayes and Boquerón in Paraguay. It starts at the Argentinian border in José Falcón and ends at the Bolivian border in Fortín Sgto. Rodríguez, traversing 780 km (485 mi).

== Distances and important cities ==
The following table shows the distances traversed by PY09 in each different department, and important cities that it passes by (or near).

Km	City	Department	Junctions/Tolls
0	José Falcón	Presidente Hayes	AR11/ PY12
20	Remansito	Presidente Hayes	
30	Villa Hayes	Presidente Hayes	
41	Benjamín Aceval	Presidente Hayes	
270	Pozo Colorado	Presidente Hayes	PY05/
415	Loma Plata	Boquerón	
434	Filadelfia	Boquerón	PY16
593	Mariscal Estigarribia	Boquerón	PY15
780	Fortín Sgto. Rodríguez	Boquerón	BO06
