= Tupinizando =

Social media page by Mateus Oliveira

- Tupinizando logo

Instagram information
- Page: tupinizando
- Genre: Education
- Followers: 209,437

TikTok information
- Page: Tupinizando
- Genre: Education
- Followers: 41,000

YouTube information
- Channel: Tupinizando
- Genre: Education
- Subscribers: 56,900
- Views: 3,249,324
- Last updated: 10 December 2025

Tupinizando (Portuguese: [tupiniˈzɐ̃du]; lit. 'Tupinizing') is a Brazilian social media page dedicated to the promotion of the Old Tupi language, as well as related subjects. Created by student Mateus Oliveira, it had over 209,000 followers on Instagram as of December 2025, being also available on YouTube and TikTok.

== History ==
Tupinizando was created by the then–Universidade São Francisco philosophy student Mateus Oliveira, (Note: BBC uses the name Matheus da Silva. Butzen & Dulci 2024 use Matheus Oliveira.) born in Atibaia and living in Nazaré Paulista, São Paulo, and of a family originating from the northeast of Brazil with Indigenous ancestry. According to Oliveira, the decision to start studying Old Tupi—a now dead language—occurred in 2020 still as a hobby, with no intention of sharing it, at the beginning of the COVID-19 pandemic when he was completing high school. The student considered studying languages such as Mandarin or Italian, but chose one of the more than two hundred native languages of Brazil as a way to affirm his ancestry, also stating it was a "duty" to learn at least one Indigenous language. The page was created on Instagram to share Oliveira's discoveries during the study of the language; he states that, since he began his studies, he has found out "Brazilians speak Tupi all day without knowing it".

Tupi is to us, for the formation of the Brazilian people, what Latin is to European civilization, or Greek. So, I think Tupi is our classical Indigenous language. It is the language that shaped our national identity in the early centuries, through the General Languages, which were much more spoken than Portuguese, at least two centuries ago in our history.

— Mateus Oliveira

Oliveira notes materials for studying Old Tupi are difficult to access, although this has been facilitated through the Internet, highlighting the work of the Brazilian philologist Eduardo de Almeida Navarro, author of the book Modern Method of Old Tupi.

== Page and content ==
Through Tupinizando, Mateus Oliveira explores the Tupi language from both linguistic and historical perspectives. In short video format, he provides information and curiosities about Old Tupi and its influence on Portuguese—such as the origins of words—as well as grammar lessons—such as verb conjugation or the use of adjectives. The page was created on Instagram, being also available on YouTube and TikTok. As of December 2025, Tupinizando had over 209,000 followers on Instagram, and as of February 2023 its most viewed video had been watched by over 250,000 people—in it, Oliveira informed the meanings of the names of five Brazilian states originating from Old Tupi.

Oliveira's page is associated with the democratization of historical knowledge, bringing to light facts often absent from traditional curricula on Indigenous peoples and expanding their marginalized narratives. Tupinizando also contributes to a greater online presence of Old Tupi, providing support materials for students and Indigenous people who wish to learn the language in the context of its revitalization. Indeed, Oliveira reflects he is able "to amplify the voices of people who are, at this moment, working on revitalizing the language".

== Bibliography ==
- Butzen, Gabriel Antonio; Dulci, Tereza Maria Spyer (2024). "É possível aprender História no TikTok?" [Is it possible to learn History on TikTok?]. Revista Horizontes Históricos (in Portuguese). 9 (2). Archived from the original on 15 January 2025.
- Cabral, Dherek Rinaldi (2024). A tradução como ferramenta de revitalização entre os Potiguara (PB): a criação de neologismos nos contextos didático, literário e virtual [Translation as a revitalization tool among the Potiguara (PB): the creation of neologisms in didactic, literary, and virtual contexts] (in Portuguese). São Paulo: Universidade de São Paulo. Archived from the original on 26 January 2025.
