= Brazil–Paraguay relations =

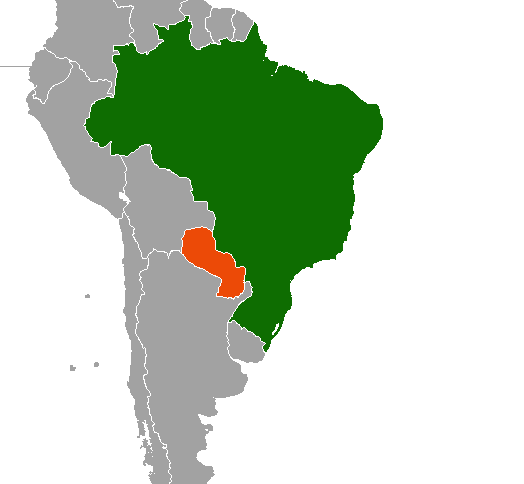

- Brazil: Paraguay

Brazil–Paraguay relations are foreign relations between Brazil and Paraguay.

== History ==
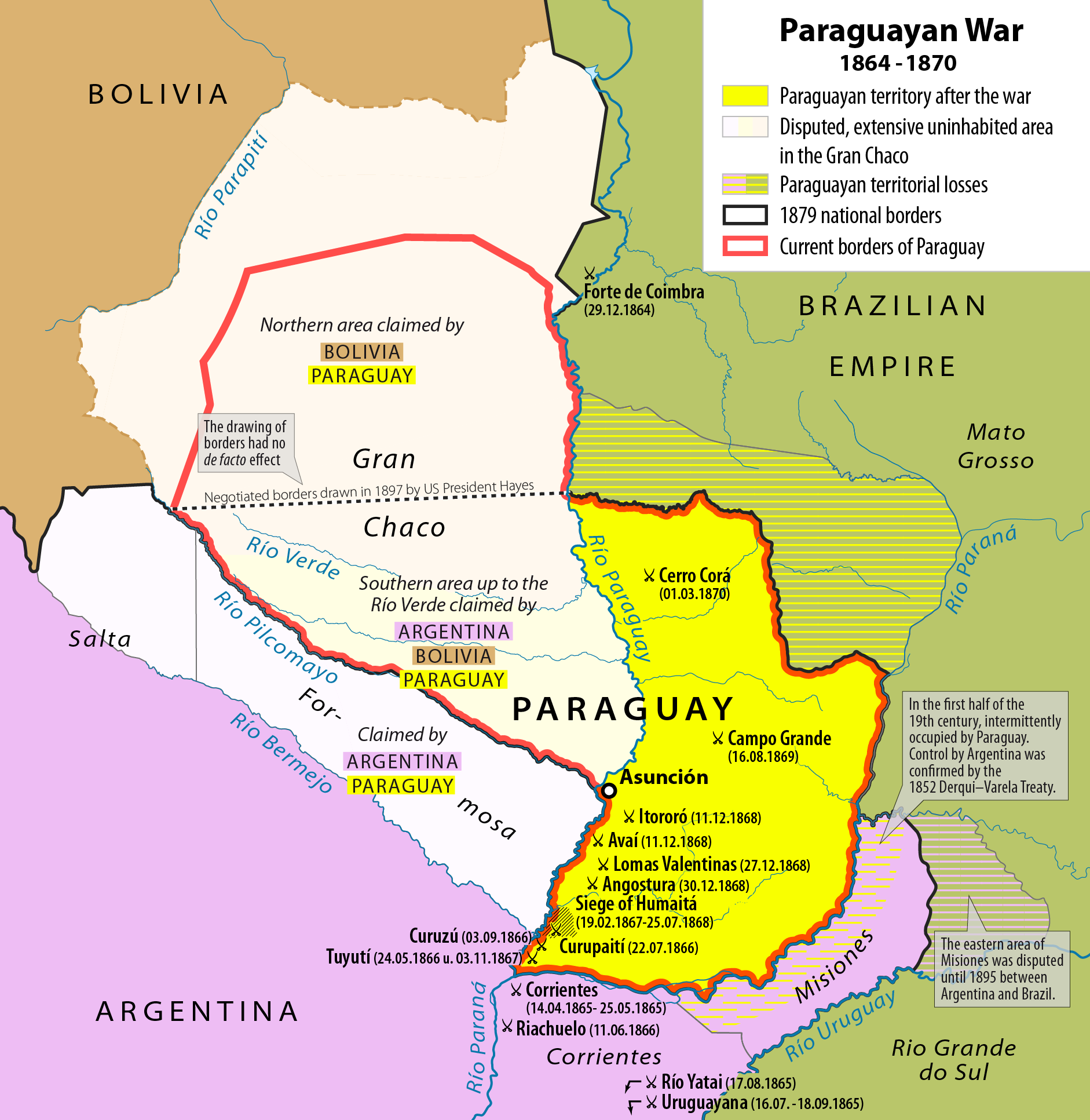
Battles and territorial disputes during the Paraguayan War

Brazil and Paraguay have a long history of diplomatic and economic relations, dating back to the 19th century when Brazil recognized Paraguay's independence from Spain in 1844.

On 14 October 1850, 800 Paraguayan troops expelled 35 Brazilian soldiers from Fecho dos Morros Island (near present-day Porto Murtinho). In December, the island was retaken by the Brazilians. 11 died during the conflict. The incident was resolved diplomatically.

In 1855, Brazil sent a naval expedition commanded by Admiral Pedro Ferreira de Oliveira, which sought to negotiate with the Paraguayan government the free circulation of Brazilian vessels on the Paraná and Paraguay rivers and to address an insult against its diplomat. The mission failed and the Admiral was fired.

Between 1857 and 1858, Brazil sent the so-called "Observation Army" which, combined with naval forces, totaled around 11,000 men. It aimed to negotiate the opening of navigation on the Paraguay River, preparing for a possible war, which did not occur.

Following unresolved tensions in the wake of the Uruguayan War, the Paraguayan War broke out between the two countries in 1864. Argentina joined the side of Brazil the following year, signing the secret Treaty of the Triple Alliance alongside Uruguay. The war ended as a Triple Alliance victory after the death of Paraguyan president Francisco Solano López on 1 March 1870. The Loizaga–Cotegipe Treaty was signed in 1872 between Brazil and Paraguay.

In the late 19th and early 20th centuries, Brazil and Paraguay engaged in several border disputes, which were resolved with the signing of the Treaty of Peace, Friendship, Commerce and Navigation in 1932. The treaty established the boundary between the two countries, and provided for free navigation of the Paraguay River by Brazilian vessels.

In the mid-20th century, Brazil and Paraguay strengthened their economic ties with the construction of the Itaipu hydroelectric dam on the Paraná River, which forms the border between the two countries. The project, which was completed in 1984, is one of the largest hydroelectric power plants in the world and supplies electricity to both Brazil and Paraguay. In the 1960s and 1970s, Brazil supported the dictatorship of General Alfredo Stroessner in Paraguay, which was criticized for its human rights abuses. However, in the 1980s, Brazil began to support the democratic movement in Paraguay and played a key role in the country's transition to democracy in 1989. In the 1990s, Brazil and Paraguay signed several agreements aimed at promoting economic cooperation and regional integration. The two countries are founding members of the Southern Common Market (Mercosur), a regional trade bloc established in 1991 that also includes Argentina and Uruguay.

== 21st century ==
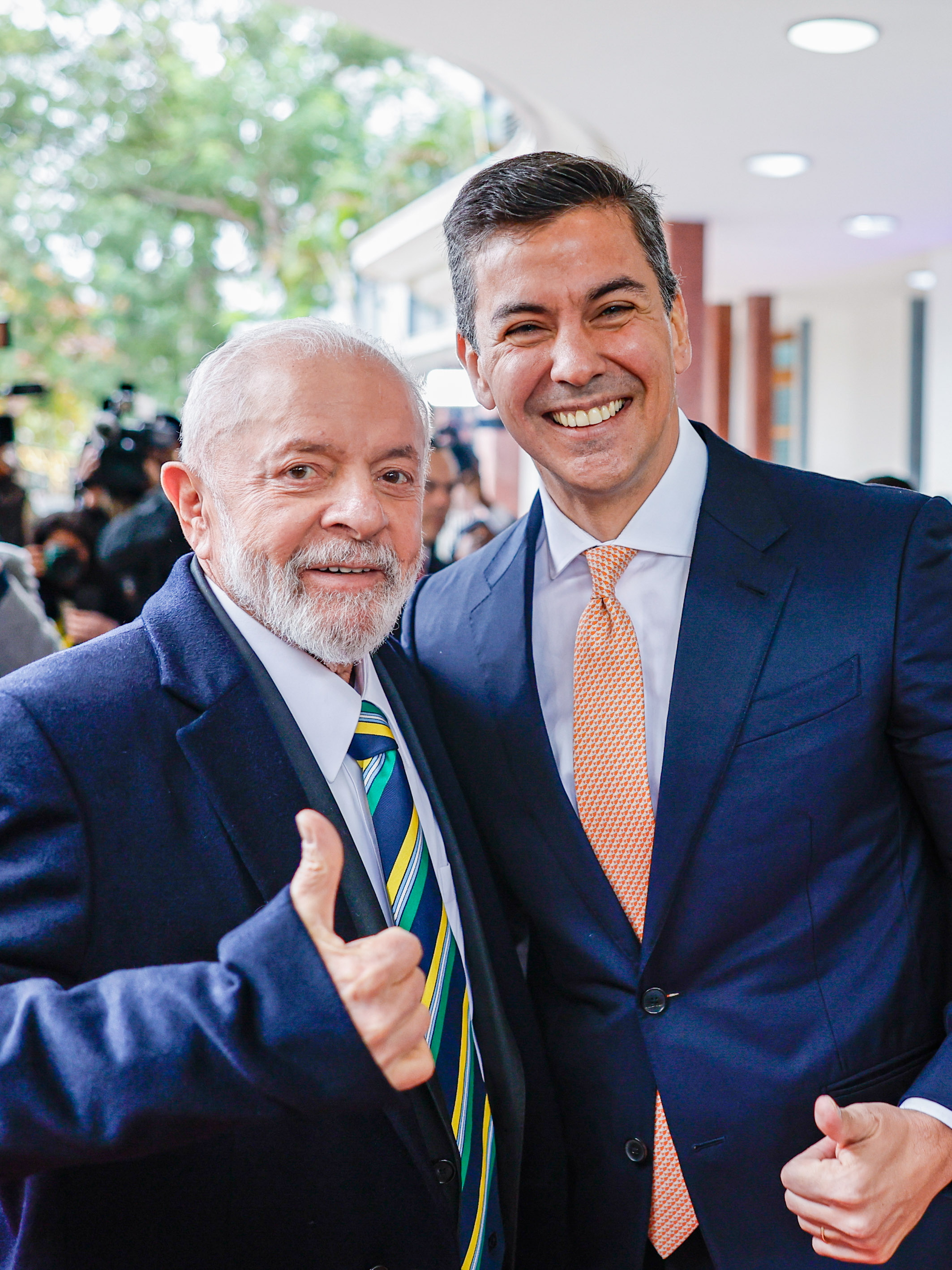
Presidents Luiz Inácio Lula da Silva and Santiago Peña of Brazil and Paraguay respectively in July 2024.

Brazil–Paraguay relations have improved greatly after Brazilian President Lula's decision in 2009 to triple its payments to Paraguay for energy from a massive hydro-electric dam on their border, ending a long-running dispute. Under the accord, Brazil will pay Paraguay $360m a year for energy from the jointly-operated Itaipu plant. Brazilian President Luiz Inácio Lula da Silva called it a "historic agreement" and the deal slated as a political victory for Paraguayan President Fernando Lugo. But deep-rooted problems remain in the relationship between the two countries, foremost of which are the unfavorable terms of the 1973 Itaipú Treaty under which Paraguay must sell hydro energy to Brazil as a derisory price and the presence of 300,000 Brazilian mainly soybean farmers in Paraguay, who pay minimal tax and have produced an exodus of small farmers from rural areas.

Brazil is home to 43,731 Paraguayan citizens. Most Paraguayan Brazilians live in the state of São Paulo. In addition, Paraguay is home to hundreds of thousands of Brazilian immigrants, or Brasiguayos, whose presence has caused tension in border regions.

=== Impeachment of Fernando Lugo ===
In June 2012 Paraguay's senate voted 39–4 to dismiss president Fernando Lugo from office. The event garnered criticism from neighboring countries, with Brazil recalling its ambassador. As a result, Paraguay was suspended from Mercosur, which included Argentina, Brazil, Uruguay, and the then-recent addition of Venezuela. However, Paraguay reintegrated into the trade block after the suspension.

=== Recent relations ===
Paraguay's president (2018–2023), Mario Abdo Benítez, had a close relationship with Brazilian President (2019–2022), Jair Bolsonaro. In February 2019, Brazilian President Jair Bolsonaro praised the late military strongman of Paraguay, Alfredo Stroessner, calling him "a man of vision" during a ceremony at the Itaipu hydroelectric dam on the countries' shared border. At his side was Paraguayan President Mario Abdo Benitez.

== Resident diplomatic missions ==
of Brazil in Paraguay

- Asunción (Embassy)
- Asunción (Consulate-General)
- Ciudad del Este (Consulate-General)
- Pedro Juan Caballero (Consulate)
- Salto del Guairá (Consulate)
- Concepción (Vice-Consulate)
- Encarnación (Vice-Consulate)

of Paraguay in Brazil

- Brasília (Embassy)
- Curitiba (Consulate-General)
- Foz do Iguaçu (Consulate-General)
- Rio de Janeiro (Consulate-General)
- São Paulo (Consulate-General)
- Guaíra (Consulate)
- Ponta Porã (Consulate)
- Porto Murtinho (Consulate)

Embassy of Brazil in Asunción

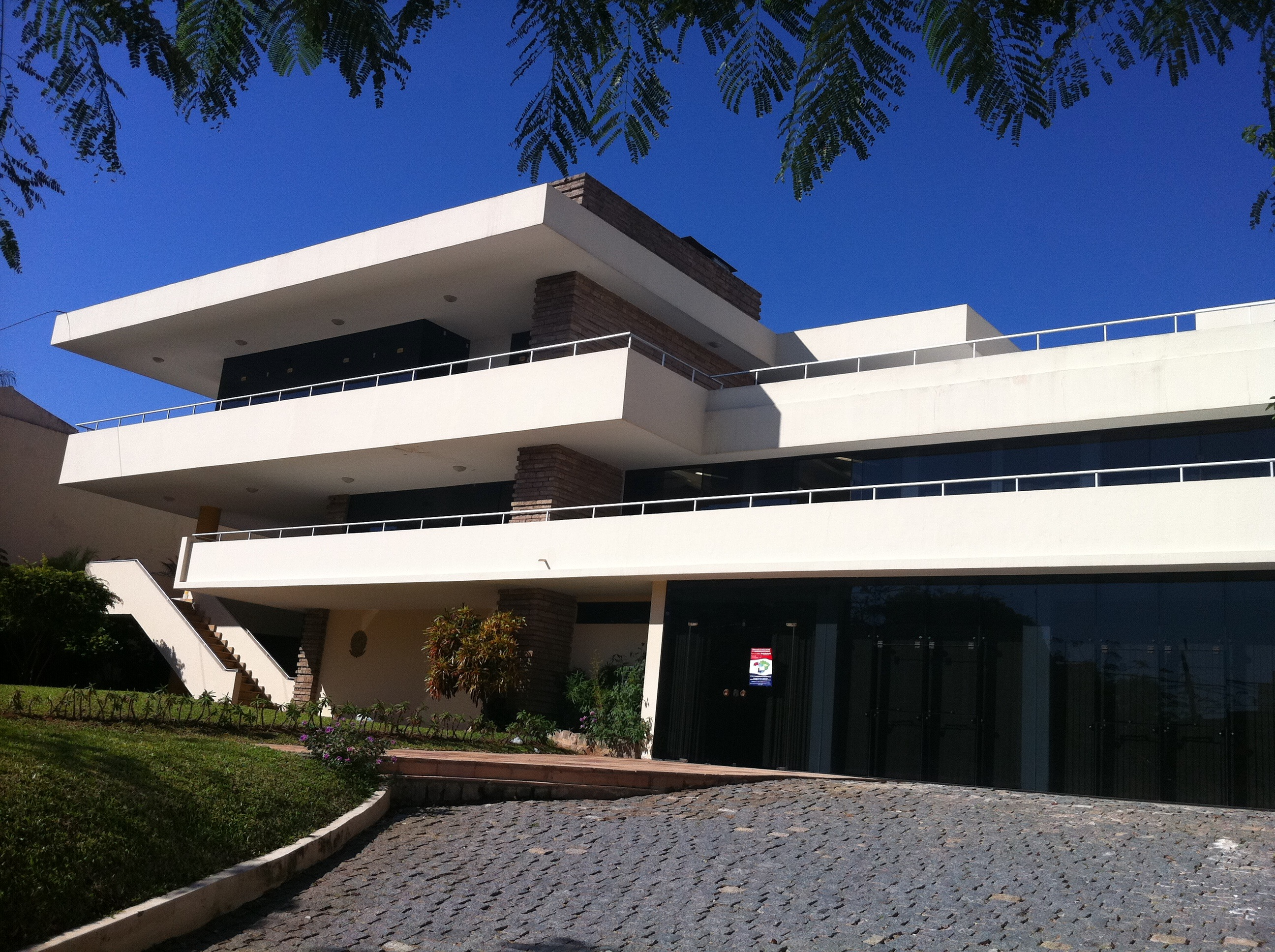
Consulate-General of Brazil in Asunción

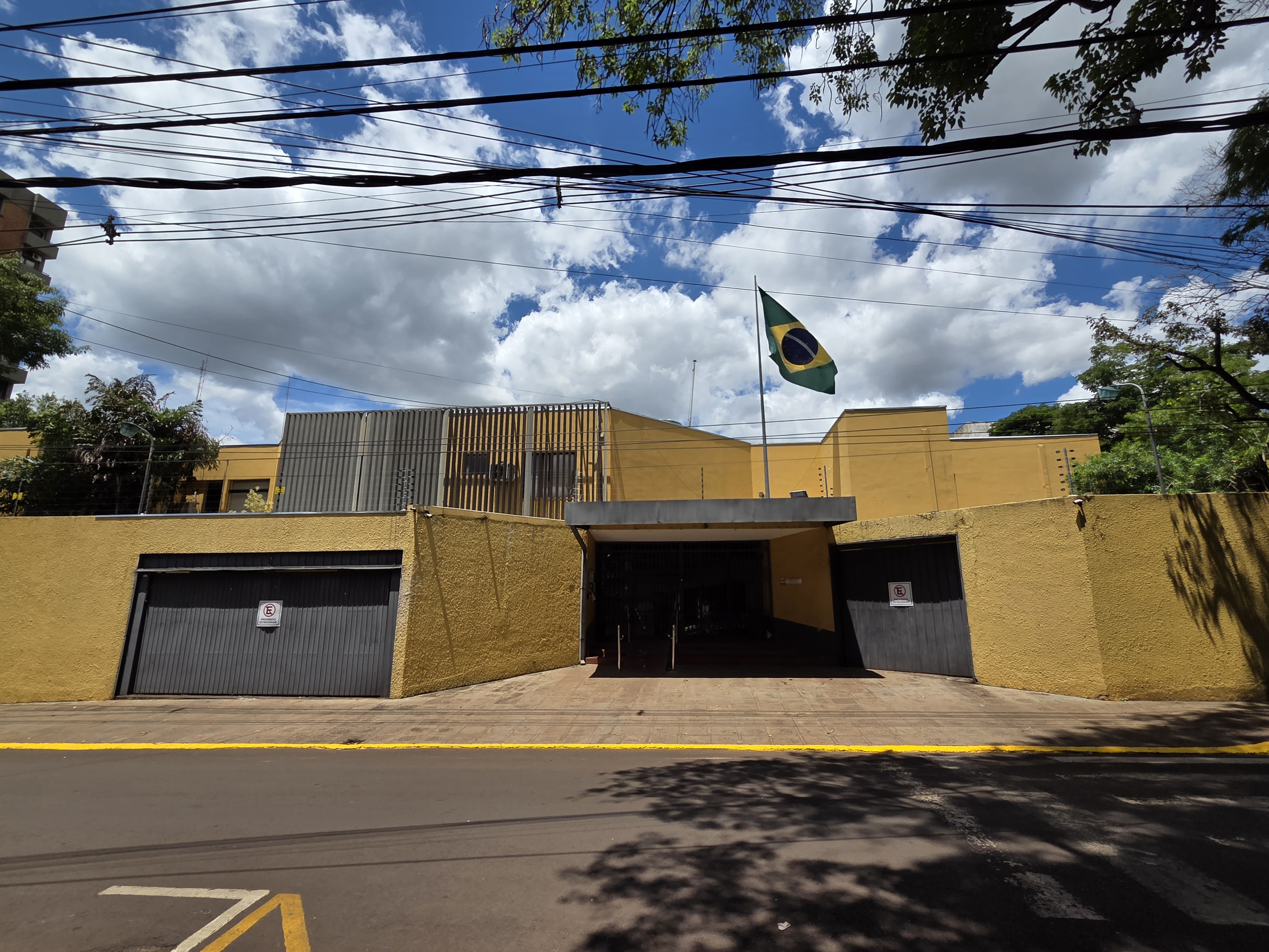
Consulate-General of Brazil in Ciudad del Este
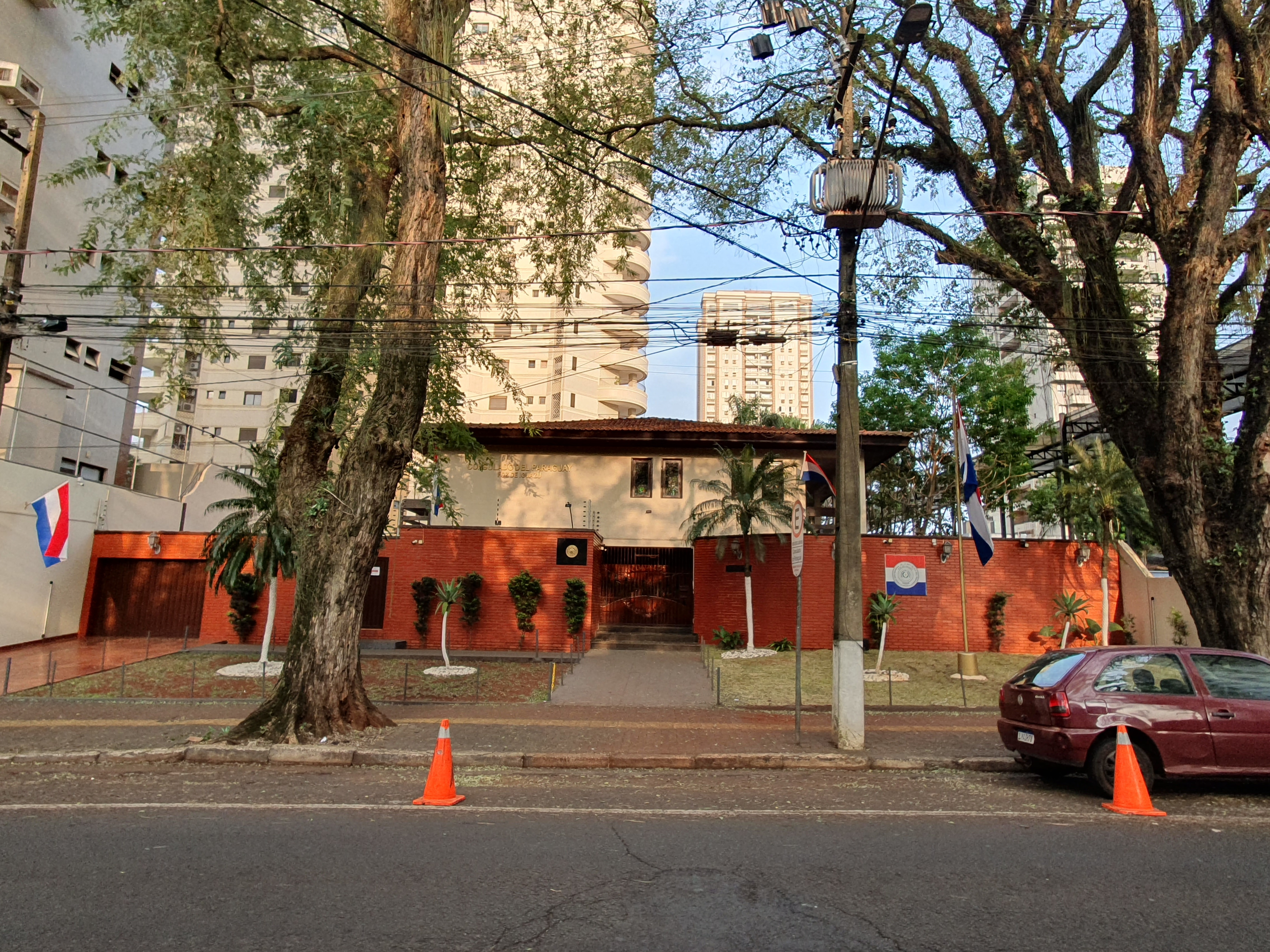
Consulate-General of Paraguay in Foz do Iguaçu

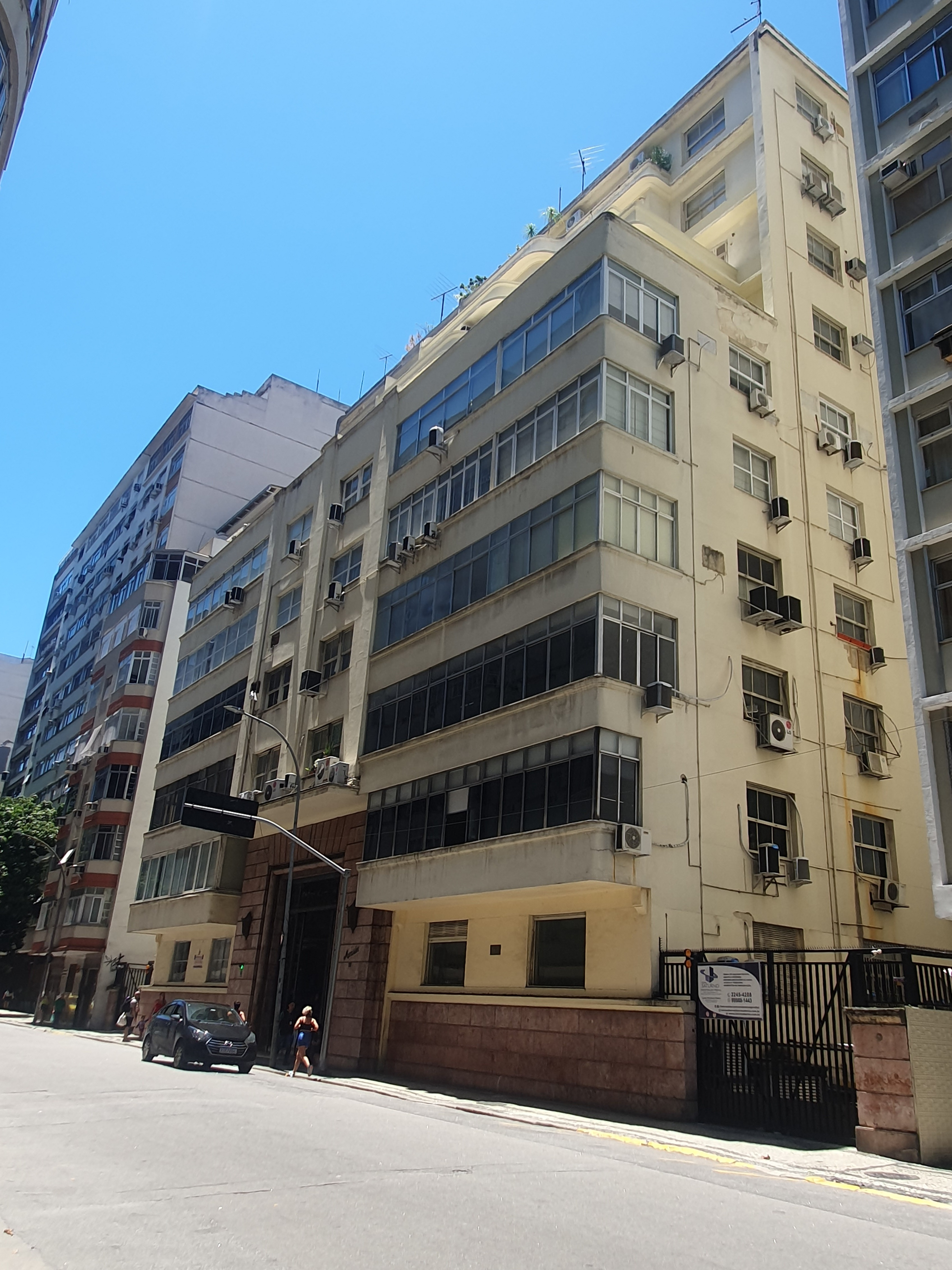
Building hosting the Consulate-General of Paraguay in Rio de Janeiro

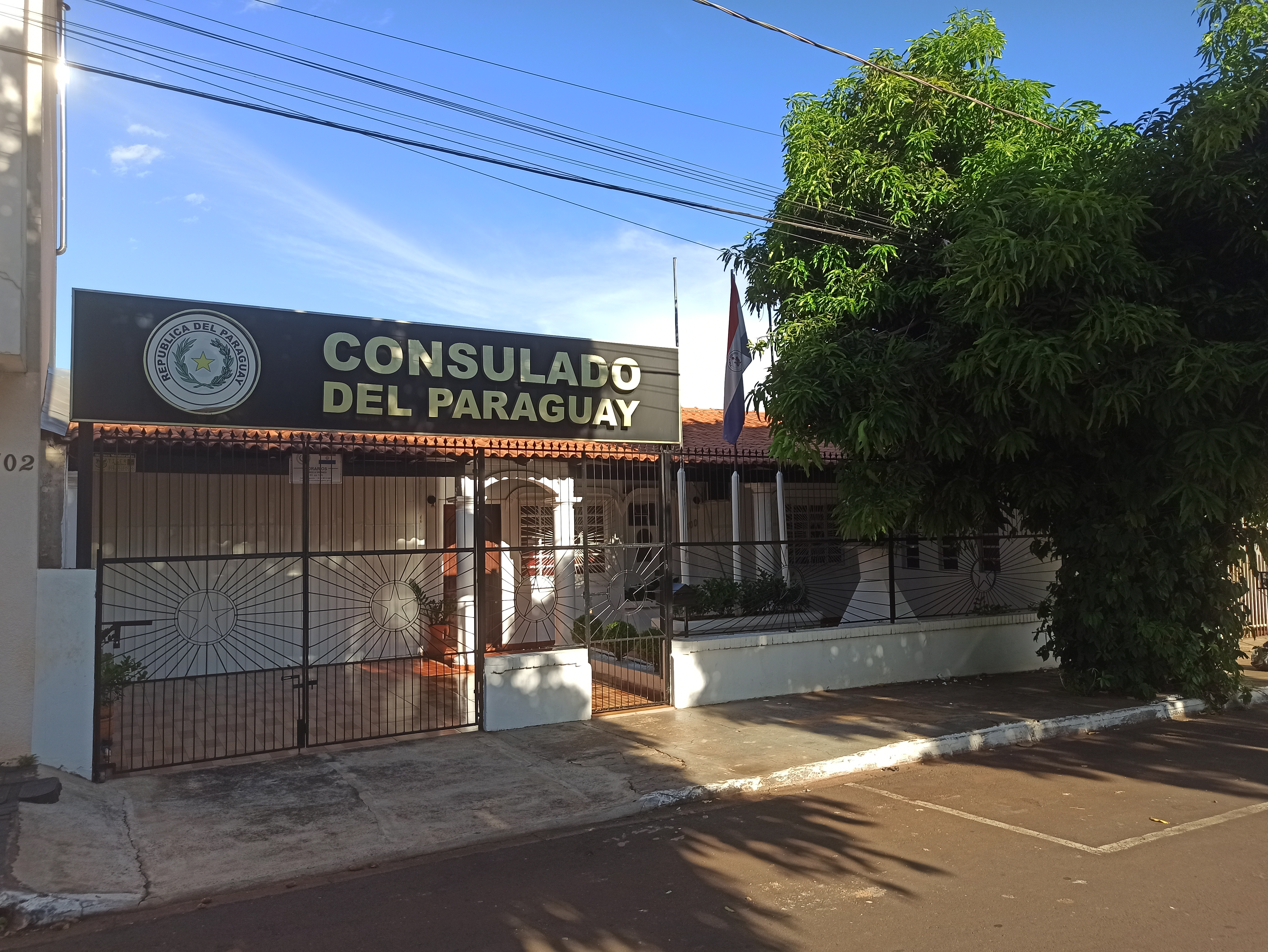
Consulate of Paraguay in Guaíra

== See also ==
- Foreign relations of Brazil
- Foreign relations of Paraguay
- List of ambassadors of Paraguay to Brazil

== Notes ==
=== Primary sources ===
In the text, these references are preceded by a double dagger (‡):
