= Boquerón Department =

Department of Paraguay

Boquerón Department Departamento de Boquerón (Spanish) Tetãvore Vokerón (Guarani)
- Department
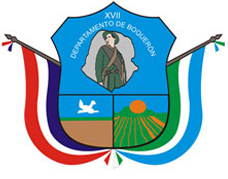
- Flag Coat of arms

- Coordinates: 21°31′S 60°42′W
- Country: Paraguay
- Capital: Filadelfia
- Number of Districts: 4

Government
  - Governor: Harold Bergen (ANR)

Area
  - Total: 91,669 km^{2} (35,394 sq mi)

Population (2022 census)
  - Total: 71,078
  - Density: 0.77538/km^{2} (2.0082/sq mi)
- Time zone: UTC-03 (PYT)
- ISO 3166 code: PY-19

Boquerón (Spanish pronunciation: [bokeˈɾon]) is a department in the western region of Paraguay. It is the country's largest department, with an area of 91,669 km^{2} (35,394 sq mi), but, according to the census for 2022 by INE, its population is 71,078, being the second least populated department. The department includes the Mennonite colonies of Fernheim, Menno and its administrative center Loma Plata and Neuland. The capital is Filadelfia. Other towns are General Eugenio A. Garay, Doctor Pedro P. Peña and Mariscal Estigarribia.

Boquerón was split in 1945, with the northern portion separated off being renamed "Chaco". The reduced remaining area continued to be called "Boquerón", and the department's capital was moved to Filadelfia (the previous capital had been Doctor Pedro P. Peña). However, in 1992 the previous department Chaco was re-integrated into Boquerón, effectively re-forming the department as of 1945 when it was split, except that after 1992 the enlarged department's capital remained at Filadelfia.

== Geography ==
Boquerón Department is located in the Occidental Region of Paraguay, between the southern parallels 20° 06' and 23° 50' of latitude, and the western meridians 50° 20' and 62° 40' of longitude. It is the largest department of Paraguay, with an area of 91,669 km^{2} (35,394 sq mi), slightly larger than Hungary or the province of South Sumatra.

=== Adjacent territories ===
North: Alto Paraguay Department, separated by an arbitrary straight line that goes from Hito IV Fort Tte. G. Mendoza to Fort Madrejón; and also by a railway from "km 220" to "km 160".

South: Argentina, separated by the Pilcomayo River, from Misión San Lorenzo to Hito I Esmeralda.

East: Presidente Hayes Department, separated by the road that connects Misión San Lorenzo with Fort Gral. Díaz, Ávalos Sánchez, Zenteno, Dr. Gaspar Rodríguez de Francia, Boquerón, Isla Po'í and Casanillo; and from this point, by an imaginary straight line until "km 160". It also borders Alto Paraguay Department, separated from it by a straight imaginary line from Fort Madrejón to Fort Carlos Antonio López and from there by another line to Fort Montanía.

West: Bolivia, separated by an imaginary line from Hito I Esmeralda until Hito IV Fort Tte. Gabino Mendoza.

=== Natural environment and climate ===
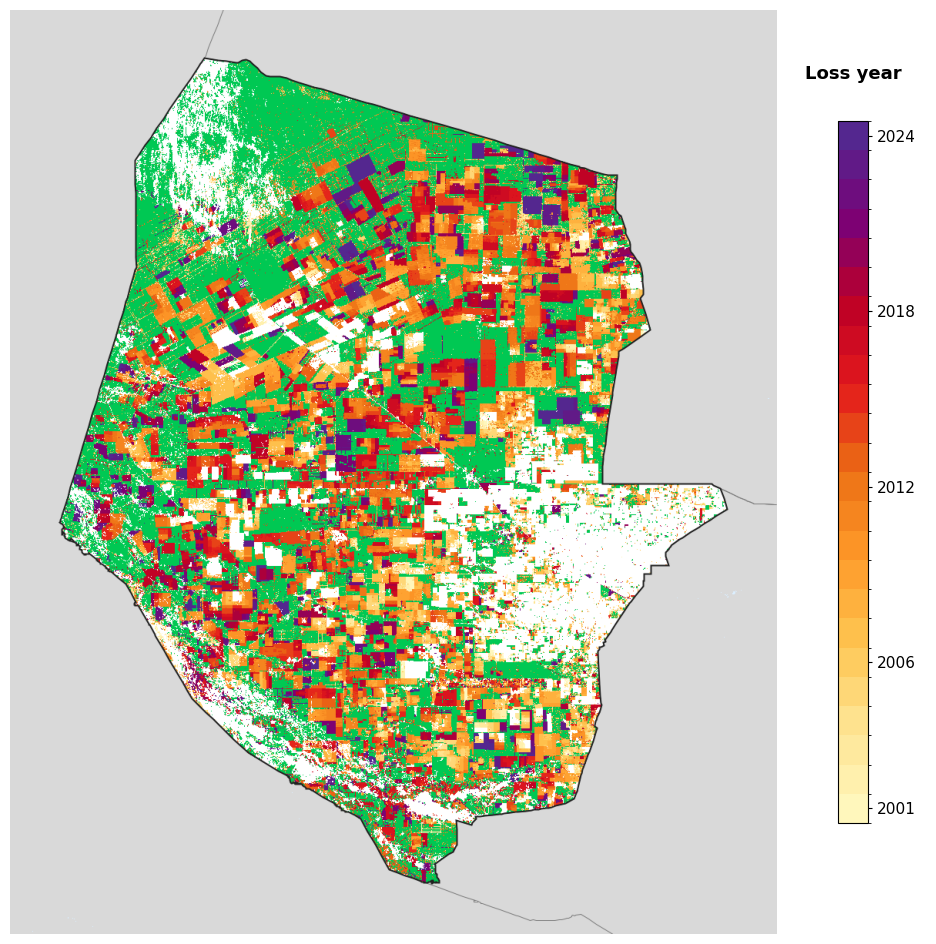
Tree-cover loss year in Boquerón, 2001-2024, from the Global Forest Change dataset.

This is the most arid region of Paraguay; it has some small streams, but with dry riverbeds. The climate is in the transition between a warm semi-arid climate, a tropical savanna climate and a humid subtropical climate (Köppen climate classification BSh, Aw and Cfa) The rain is scarce during the dry season, but during the wet season it can cause flash floods. The average annual rainfall is about 350 mm (14 in) a year in the north of the department and 850 mm (33 in) a year in the south. On 28 January 2025, Mariscal Estigarribia, a town in the Boquerón Department, recorded a temperature of 46.4 °C (115.5 °F). This is the highest temperature to have ever been recorded in Paraguay.

The trees in the area are short and thorny; there are brushwood and cactus, dunes and small hills, especially in the north of the department. Some species of trees in this region are endangered: the urunde'y, white and red quebracho, samu'u also known as palo borracho and palo santo.

== Demographics ==
Historical population
Year	Pop.	±%
1950	28,082	—
1962	40,405	+43.9%
1972	26,190	−35.2%
1982	14,790	−43.5%
1992	29,060	+96.5%
2002	41,106	+41.5%
2012	56,440	+37.3%
2022	71,078	+25.9%

Boquerón presently has the fastest rate of population growth, about 12.4% annually. This department is characterized by its native population, the Mennonites, the Paraguayans, the Brazilians and other foreign residents in the country.

The National Census in 2002 registered 45,617 people living in Boquerón, mostly Native Americans (19,945, or 43.7%, distributed in the following ethnic groups: Nivaclé, Manjui, Guarayos, Angaité, Ayoreos, Guaraní-Ñandéva, Tapieté and Toba-Maskóy). The majority of Paraguay's native population lives in this department.

=== Population ===
The total Native population of the country is 87,099. The quantity in Chaco is 42,939. The total Boquerón population is 45,617, 19,945 of which are natives. Growth of the total population in Boquerón is 4.6% and in the Urban area alone is 12.4%.

- Filadelfia: 7,750
- Loma Plata: 6,500
- Yalve Sanga: 4,200
- Mariscal Estigarribia: 2,000
- Neu-Halbstadt: 720
- Choferes del Chaco: 600

== District and departmental governments ==

The department is divided in 4 districts:

1. Filadelfia
2. Loma Plata
3. Mariscal Estigarribia
4. Boquerón

Boquerón had only one district since December 18, 1944. In December 2006, Loma Plata and Filadelfia were added, and this last became the new capital of the department by Law 71/92. Boquerón now has 5 members and 45 councilors in the executive government.

In January 2021, a new district was created after enactment by the Paraguayan government: the Boquerón district, which covers the Neuland Colony region, being separated from the Mariscal Estigarribia district. As a result, the department now has 4 districts.

The government of the department administers two high schools, one agricultural school, a hospital and the Hydrological Resources Director (DRH for its initials in Spanish), that belongs to the Agriculture and Cattle Ministry. It has a Health and Education Secretary, a Natural Environment Secretary, a Secretary for Native-American Related Affairs, Public Construction, Women Related Affairs, Childhood and Youth Secretaries.

== Education ==
The department has 160 educational institutions with 9,000 students and more than 450 teachers. These numbers include the private institutions and the one that provides professional skills education. Literacy instruction reaches 80%, according to the Census of 2002.

Distance is the main challenge for both students and teachers; it can be difficult to get to the educational institutions, leading people to drop out of school. There are some marginal areas with well-defined curricular norms set by the Occidental Region, but there are not enough teachers for the classes.

The total registered students is 8,932: 6,689 in elementary school and 2,243 in high school in a total of 103 schools. There are 384 registered teachers.

The literate population of 15 years and more is 21,482.

== Health ==
This department has 4 private hospitals. The 17th Health Region, assisted by the Ministry of Public Health and Social Wellbeing, has a regional hospital in Mariscal Estigarribia. The government supports the Maternal and Childhood Center in Villa Choferes del Chaco. More than half of the population is in Filadelfia, Loma Plata, Yalve Sanga and Colonia Neuland.

The natives receive health care from the private sector. Some of them have Social Security, but not all. In this department are 23 health centers, which have 8.8 beds per 10,000 inhabitants.

Mennonites have private medical insurance and are well-organized in that sector. The health system is a basic necessity and is the one that needs more attention, considering that 22% of the population in the area lives in poverty.

== Economy ==
Cattle ranches and dairy farms generate the greatest share of the income, with the dairy products and meat being exported. There are 4,500 owners of 900,000 cows. The area's daily dairy production is about 450,000 to 500,000 liters of milk; this forms 70% of the industry in the Central Chaco.

Leatherworking is a considerable portion of the local economy, with saddles and shoes the main products. In agriculture, the common products are: bananas, lemons, sweet and sour oranges, tangerines, beans, sweet potatoes, onions, pumpkins, corn, peanuts and sorghum.

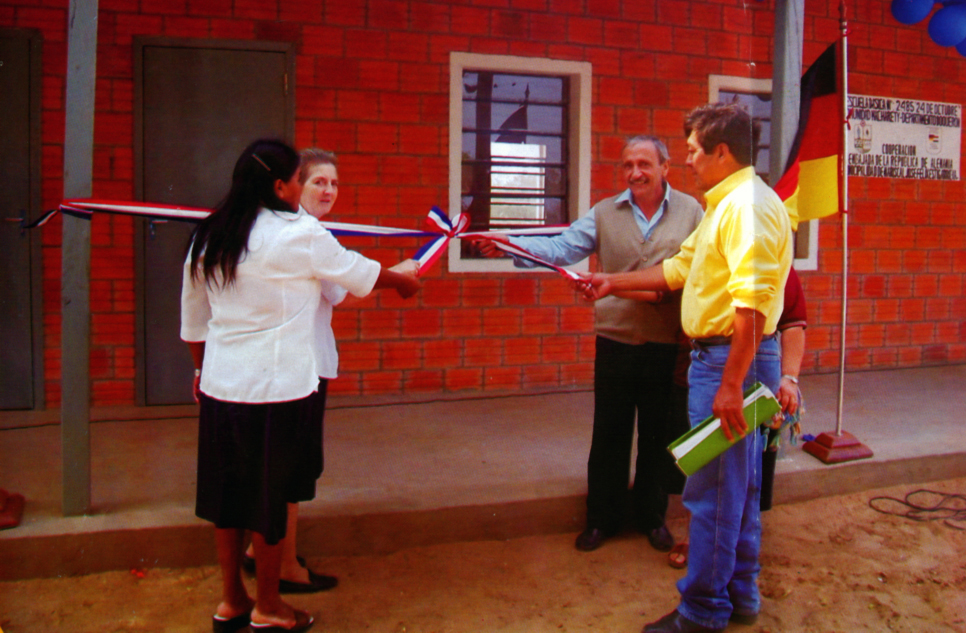
Inauguration of school

== Communications ==
Boquerón has 120 kilometers of paved roads, but also many that are not paved, which makes travel difficult in the rainy and dry seasons.

Traveling to and within Boquerón can be difficult. Logistical planning is often necessary, including taking drinking water, food, enough fuel, and an emergency kit.

The Mennonites in the area often perform their own road maintenance on approximately 3,800 kilometers of road every year. They also know the region very well.

The Mariscal Estigarribia district has an airport used by all kinds of planes.

In some districts, modern technology such as television, internet and cell phones are available. Nevertheless, there are places where communication is impossible because of the characteristics of the land. In addition most of the Ayoreo natives who still live in the interior have not yet adapted to civilization.

Radio stations serve a fundamental role as a means of communication. La Voz del Chaco Paraguayo AM, broadcasts to the entire Occidental Region, reaching places where communication is usually difficult.

There is another radio station, Radio Médano, which broadcasts in FM.

There are two community radio stations: one in Mariscal Estigarribia and another in Doctor Pedro P. Peña.

== Tourism ==
Rural and ecological tourism has become very popular in the Central Chaco, where people can witness the life and process of adaptation of the colonial immigrants. Many tourists and students visit the native villages and colonies that are dedicate to cattle and some other industries; most of them leave very pleased by the experience.

The Boquerón, Toledo and Isla Po'í forts are very popular; in these places, traces remain of the Chaco War, an important part of Paraguayan history.

== Symbols ==
Boquerón has a flag and badge. The musical theme Chaco Boreal is the anthem of the department. These symbols were presented in public on September 29, 1995, in Fort Toledo, in the presence of 200 students of the area.
