= Brasiguayos =

Brazilian–Paraguayan binational group

Brasiguaios
Brasiguayos (Spanish)
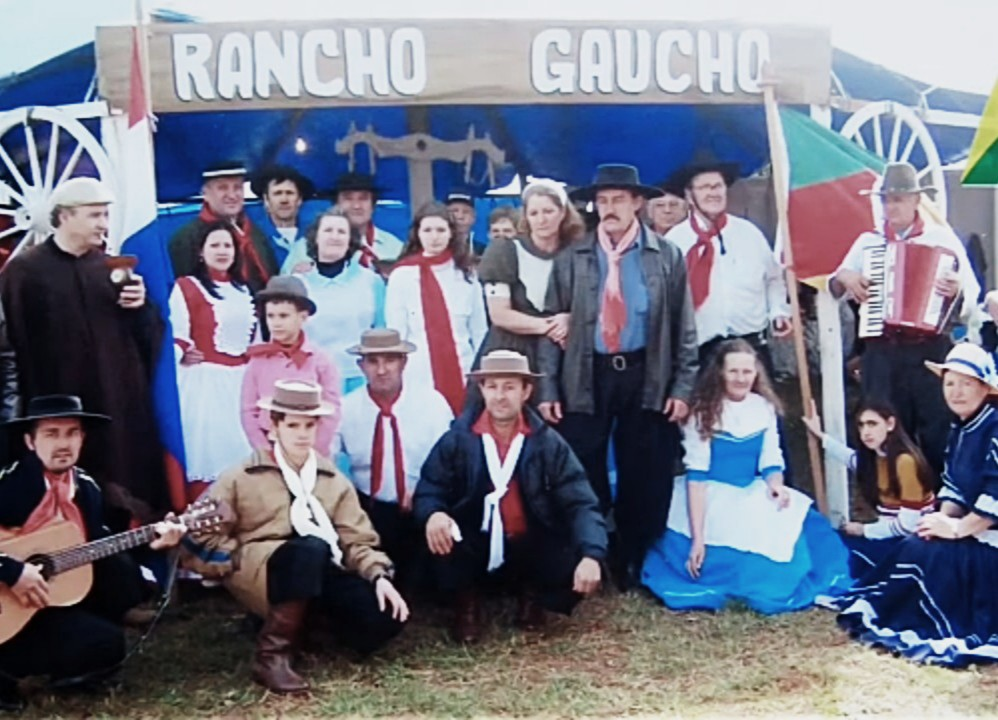
- Gaúcho dance group in Santa Rosa del Monday, Alto Paraná in 1997

Regions with significant populations
- Paraguay: 81,592–459,000
- Brazil: 68,650

Languages
- Portuguese, Spanish, Guarani

Religion
- Christianity (mainly Roman Catholicism)

Related ethnic groups
- White Brazilians · White Paraguayans

The term brasiguaio (Portuguese) or brasiguayo (Spanish) refers to individuals with social, cultural, or familial ties to both Brazil and Paraguay, particularly Brazilian migrants in Paraguay and their descendants. It may also include Paraguayans who migrated to Brazil and later returned. Population estimates for Brazilians residing in Paraguay vary widely, ranging from official Paraguayan census figures of around 81,592 to over 459,000 according to Brazilian diplomatic sources. According to 2024 estimates from the Observatory of Migrations in São Paulo, approximately 68,650 Paraguayans live in Brazil, with the largest concentration found in the states of Paraná, São Paulo, and Mato Grosso do Sul. Concentrated in Paraguayan border departments such as Alto Paraná and Canindeyú, brasiguaios are often of European descent and Portuguese-speaking, with some communities forming local majorities.

The term, coined in 1985, emerged from the large-scale migration of Brazilians, primarily smallholder farmers from southern Brazil, to eastern Paraguay in the mid-20th century, driven by land scarcity and agricultural modernization in Brazil. While originally used to describe returnees to Brazil, brasiguaio has since evolved to represent a diverse population navigating dual identities, though it often carries socio-economic and political connotations.

== Etymology ==
The words brasiguaio (Portuguese) and brasiguayo (Spanish) are blend words combining the beginning of brasileiro/brasileño (Brazilian) and the end of paraguaio/paraguayo (Paraguayan). It is commonly used by members within and outside this group when referring to Brazilian migrants in Paraguay and their descendants, as well as Paraguayans immigrants in Brazil and their descendants, including those who moved back to Paraguay after a long time. In Paraguay, it is attributed to Brazilians and their descendants living in the southeastern Paraguayan departments of Canindeyú and Alto Paraná, which border with Brazil.

The term was coined in 1985 by Sérgio Cruz, a federal deputy from Mato Grosso do Sul affiliated with the Workers' Party (PT), during a demonstration of Brazilian immigrants in the border town of Mundo Novo, Mato Grosso do Sul. It originated from a conversation in which the migrants expressed a sense of statelessness, explaining that they lacked rights both in Paraguay, where they were not considered citizens, and in Brazil, which they had left behind. In response, Cruz reportedly said: "You are brasiguaios, a mix of Brazilians and Paraguayans, men without a homeland". (Note: This quote is a translation of the original text: "Vocês são uns brasiguaios, uma mistura de brasileiros com paraguaios, homens sem pátria")

It originally described Brazilian migrants who returned from Paraguay to Brazil and came to represent a population navigating dual identities. Initially adopted by the migrants themselves, religious groups, and the press, the term highlighted their condition as victims of a dual exclusion—lacking full civil, political, and social rights in both countries—and came to symbolize individuals disinherited of a clear national identity. Although it broadly refers to Brazilians living in Paraguay or their descendants, the term often carries negative connotations, particularly when applied to undocumented or impoverished individual. For this reason, wealthier immigrants frequently reject the label due to its associations with marginalization.

== Migration history ==
Brazilian migration to Paraguay began in the late 1950s and expanded considerably during the 1960s and 1970s. A key driver of this movement was the lack of access to land in Brazil, especially for smallholder farmers in states such as Paraná and Mato Grosso do Sul. Structural changes in Brazilian agriculture, such as mechanization, the consolidation of landholdings, and declining viability for small-scale farming, led to the displacement of sharecroppers (meeiros), squatters (posseiros), landless laborers (bóias-frias), and tenant farmers.

These rural populations, often unable to secure land through Brazil's internal colonization programs, sought alternatives in neighboring Paraguay. The process was colloquially referred to as "jumping the Paraná River", symbolizing the shift from Brazilian internal migration to cross-border settlement.

Most Paraguayans emigrated from Brazil in the 1960s stimulated by the Paraguayan government. The dictatorship of Alfredo Stroessner (1954–1989) actively encouraged Brazilian migration, viewing it as a tool for modernizing agriculture, expanding the population in the eastern frontier, and increasing economic productivity. Radio broadcasts and newspaper ads targeted Brazilian farmers, particularly in southern Brazil, with promises of wealth and prosperity through land ownership in Paraguay.

== Geographic distribution ==
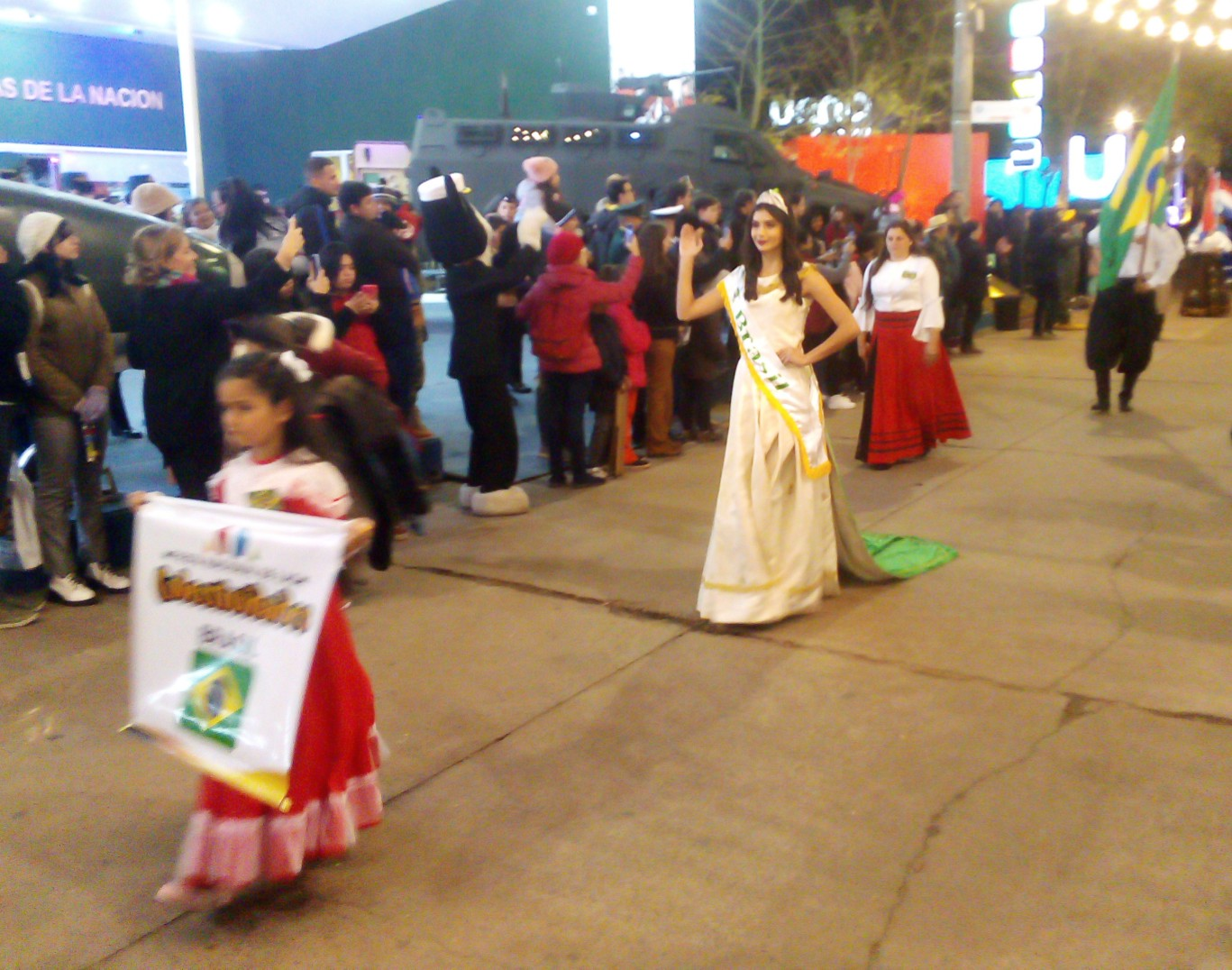
Queen of the Brazilian community of Hohenau, Itapúa.

According to the 2002 Paraguayan national census, it is estimated that 81,592 Brazilian immigrants were living in Paraguay. The majority of them, approximately 72,795, were concentrated in eastern departments bordering Brazil, including Alto Paraná, Canindeyú, and Amambay. This marked a decrease from the 1992 census, which had recorded 108,526 Brazilians in the country. In contrast to Paraguay's figures, the Brazilian Ministry of Foreign Affairs estimated in 2002 that around 459,000 Brazilians resided in Paraguay, making it the largest community of Brazilians in any neighboring country and the second largest worldwide after the United States.

According to 2024 estimates from the Observatory of Migrations in São Paulo (OBMigra), approximately 68,650 Paraguayans reside in Brazil, with their presence being most significant in the states of Paraná, São Paulo, and Mato Grosso do Sul. In some border zones, Brazilians who reside in Paraguay and their descendants are more than 90% of the population and Portuguese is widely spoken. In the town of Mbaracayú, approximately 80% of its 23,000 inhabitants are of Brazilian ancestry. The origins of brasiguaios are said to be mostly from the three states of the South Region of Brazil in proximity to Paraguay, Paraná, Santa Catarina, and Rio Grande do Sul. Most brasiguaios are ethnically White and of German, Italian and Polish descent.

== See also ==
- Brazil–Paraguay relations
- Brazilian diaspora
- Immigration to Paraguay
