= Filadelfia, Paraguay =

Filadelfia
- Town
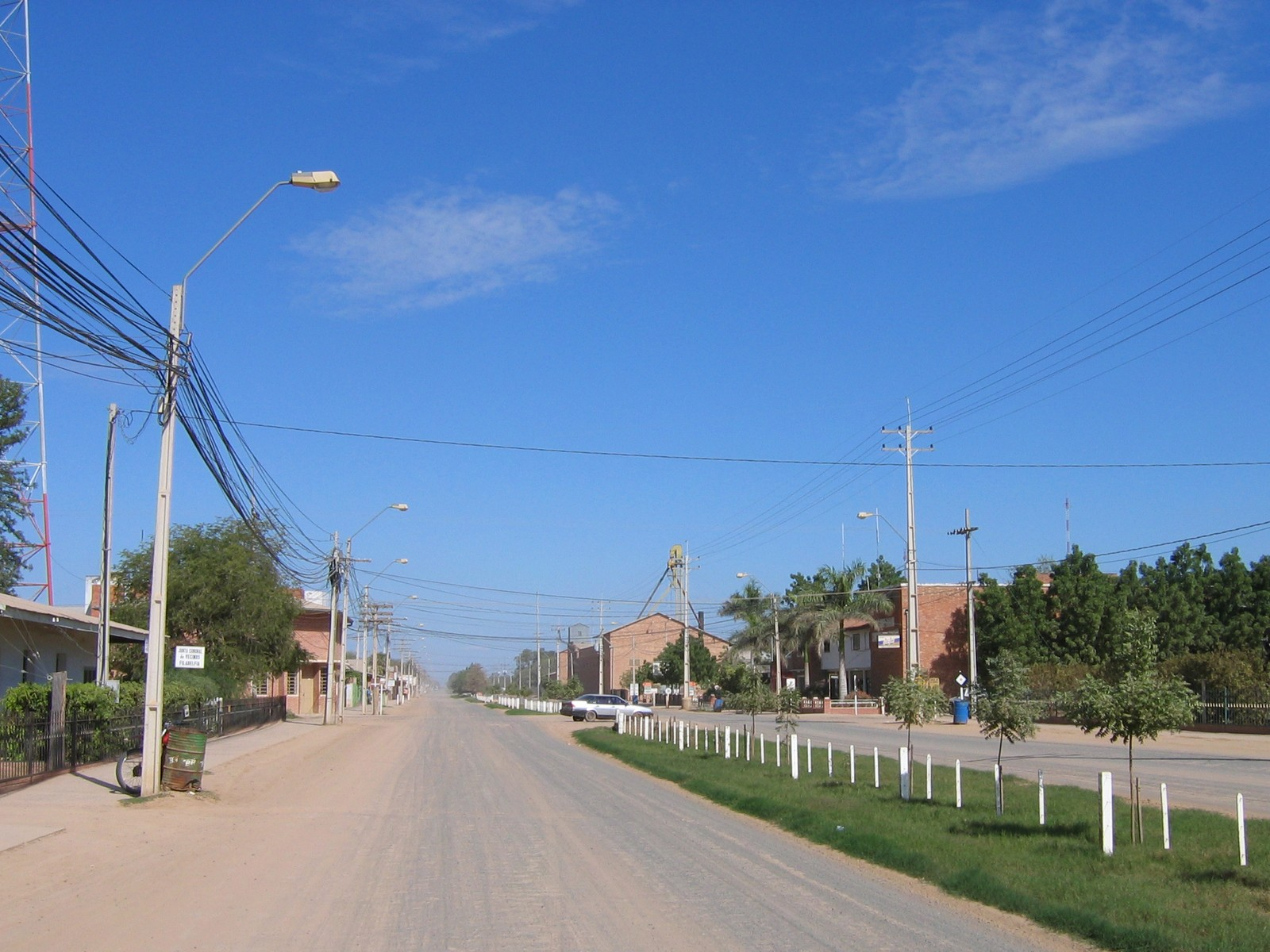
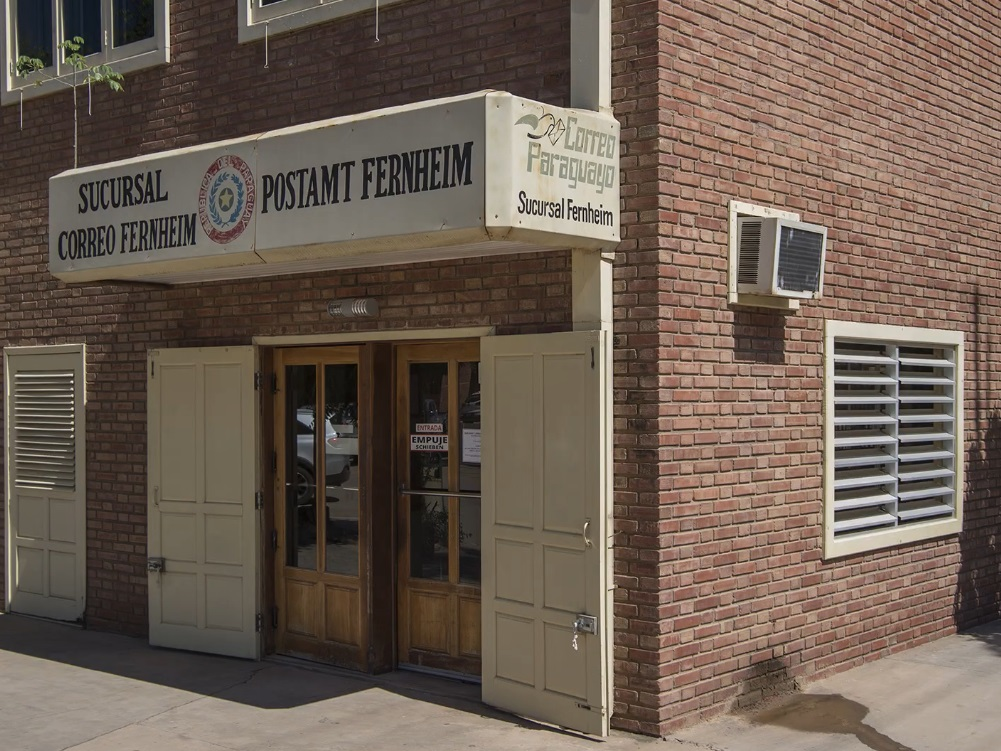
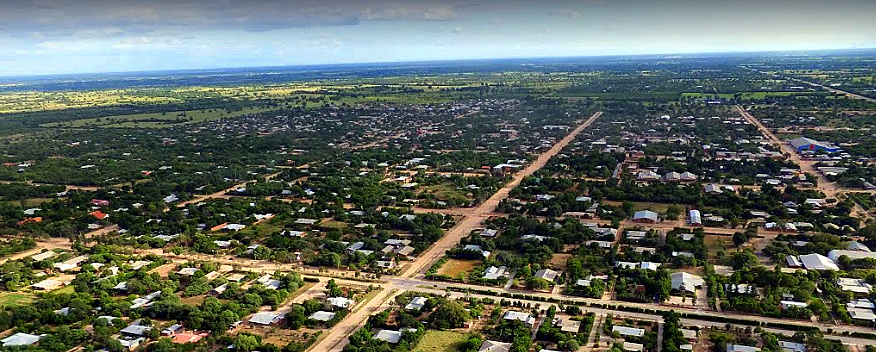
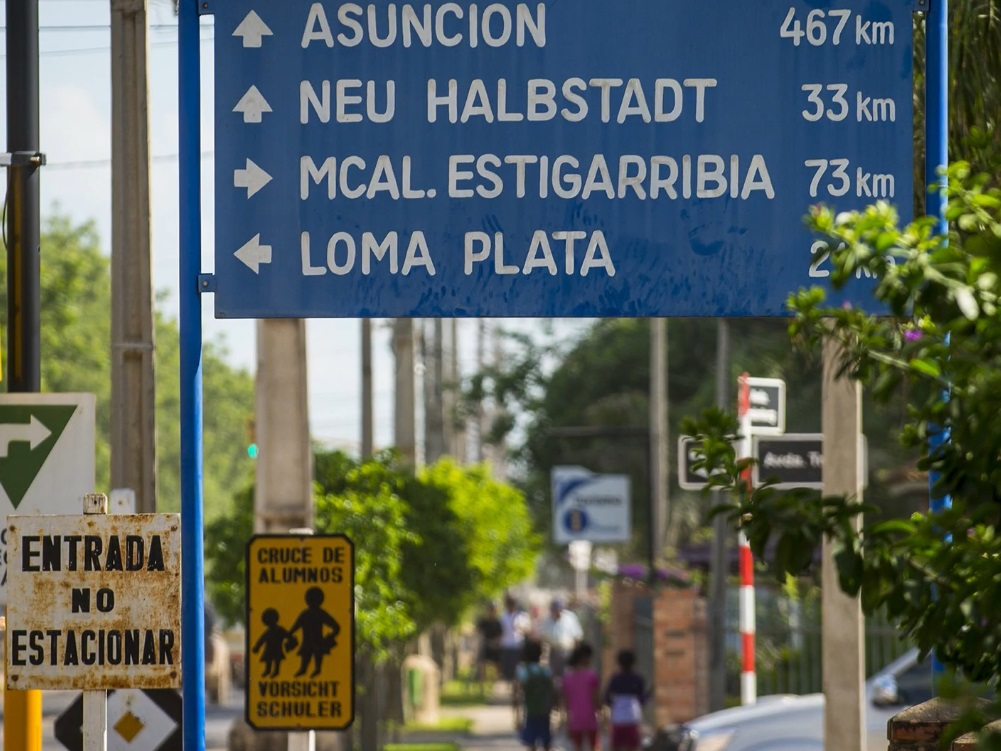
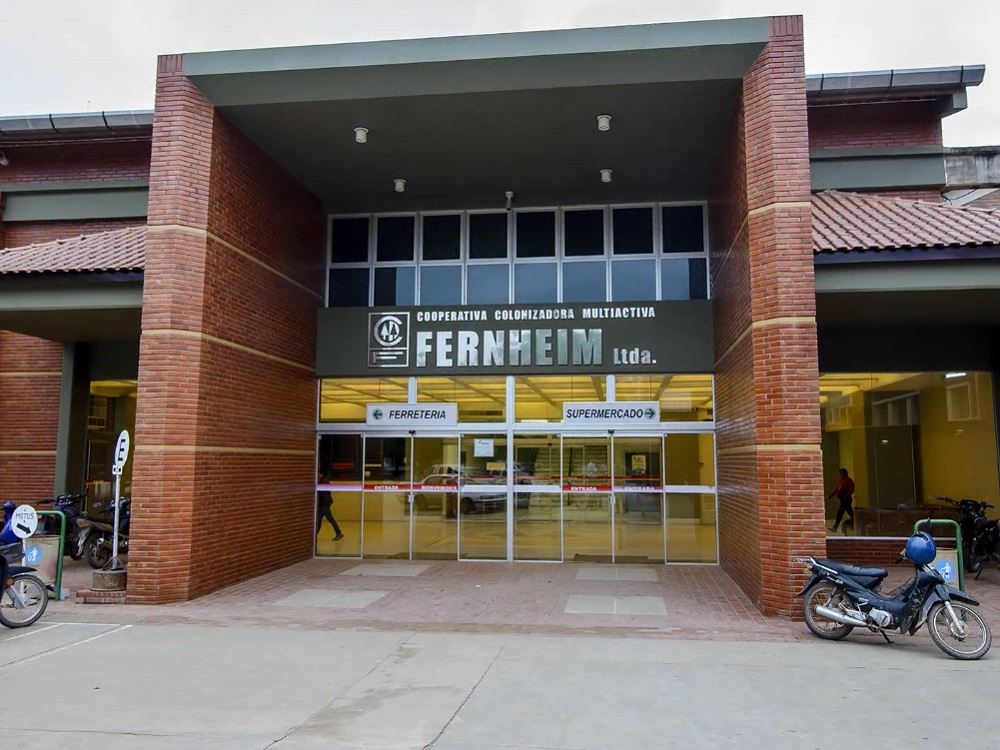
- A collage of 5 photos, featuring the main road of Filadelfia, a mail building, city view, a road sign in Filadelfia, and a building.

- Location within Paraguay
- Coordinates: 22°20′24″S 60°1′48″W
- Country: Paraguay
- Department: Boquerón

Government
  - Intendant: Claudelino Rodas Núñez

Area
  - Total: 13,879 km^{2} (5,359 sq mi)

Population (2021)
  - Total: 19,927
  - Density: 1.4358/km^{2} (3.7186/sq mi)
- Time zone: UTC-4
- Area code: +595 491
- Climate: BSh

Filadelfia (Spanish pronunciation: [fi.laˈðel.fja]) is the capital of Boquerón Department in the Gran Chaco of western Paraguay. It is the centre of the Fernheim Colony. The city lies about 450 kilometres (280 mi) northwest of the capital Asunción. With a population of about 20,000, it is the largest town in the 400 kilometer (250 mile) radius, and accounts for almost a third of the departmental population.

== History ==
Filadelfia was founded in 1930 by Russian Mennonites who fled from the Soviet Union. Filadelfia lay near the front of the Chaco War, but was little affected. It became divided in the Second World War, with some of the original German colonists supporting Germany and later being expelled.

Filadelfia has developed into an important cattle herding settlement.

== Infrastructure ==
Today the town is home to a museum, a library, a radio station, and a hospital. The museum displays objects from the town's Mennonite past, like Russian overcoats, and the local wildlife, such as stuffed armadillos, anteaters, and toads. The colony's villages lie around Filadelfia, as do several native reserves, home to much of the area's native population, from the Chulupí, Lengua, Toba-Pilaga, Ayoreo, and Sanapaná groups. A modern supermarket is located in the centre of the town, which is the last place to get groceries before heading further out into the Chaco. Most of the town's potable water supply is drawn from underground cisterns, being replenished by intermittent rainfall; the underground water is too salty to drink. A small commemorative park known as Parque Trebol lies about 5 km (3 mi) to the east of town. It now serves as a place for visitors to camp for the night.

== Transportation ==
The newly asphalted highway, PY09, from Asunción continues past Filadelfia for another 70 km (40 mi) and runs out at the military checkpoint Mariscal Estigarribia. From this point onwards, the road to the border town fort General Eugenio A. Garay with Bolivia is almost impassable.

== Climate ==
The climate is semi-tropical, so it is quite hot. Summers are humid and temperatures can regularly reach over 40 °C. Winters are warm and dry. Filadelfia's climate can be considered a Tropical savanna climate (Aw) according to the Köppen climate classification.

Climate data for Filadelfia (1991–2021)
Month	Jan	Feb	Mar	Apr	May	Jun	Jul	Aug	Sep	Oct	Nov	Dec	Year
Mean daily maximum °C (°F)	33.8 (92.8)	32.8 (91.0)	31.2 (88.2)	29.0 (84.2)	24.8 (76.6)	23.9 (75.0)	24.1 (75.4)	27.9 (82.2)	30.3 (86.5)	32.2 (90.0)	32.1 (89.8)	33.1 (91.6)	29.6 (85.3)
Daily mean °C (°F)	29.4 (84.9)	28.6 (83.5)	27.2 (81.0)	25.1 (77.2)	21.2 (70.2)	20.2 (68.4)	19.7 (67.5)	22.6 (72.7)	24.7 (76.5)	27.3 (81.1)	27.4 (81.3)	28.7 (83.7)	25.2 (77.3)
Mean daily minimum °C (°F)	24.9 (76.8)	24.4 (75.9)	23.2 (73.8)	21.1 (70.0)	17.5 (63.5)	16.4 (61.5)	15.3 (59.5)	17.2 (63.0)	19.1 (66.4)	22.3 (72.1)	22.7 (72.9)	24.2 (75.6)	20.7 (69.3)
Average precipitation mm (inches)	132 (5.2)	136 (5.4)	137 (5.4)	96 (3.8)	79 (3.1)	47 (1.9)	33 (1.3)	33 (1.3)	53 (2.1)	103 (4.1)	133 (5.2)	125 (4.9)	1,107 (43.7)
Average precipitation days	9	9	9	7	7	6	5	4	5	7	9	9	86
Average relative humidity (%)	61	65	68	69	69	71	64	52	49	56	59	61	62
Mean daily sunshine hours	9.9	9.1	8.2	7.4	6.2	6.2	7.4	8.9	9.2	8.7	9.2	9.6	8.3
Source: climate-data.org

== Notable people ==
- A distinguished Russian Mennonite writer and historian living in Filadelfia was Peter P. Klassen.
- Former Canadian Minister of Public Safety Vic Toews was born in Filadelfia in 1952.
