= List of cathedrals in Paraguay =

This is the list of cathedrals in Paraguay.

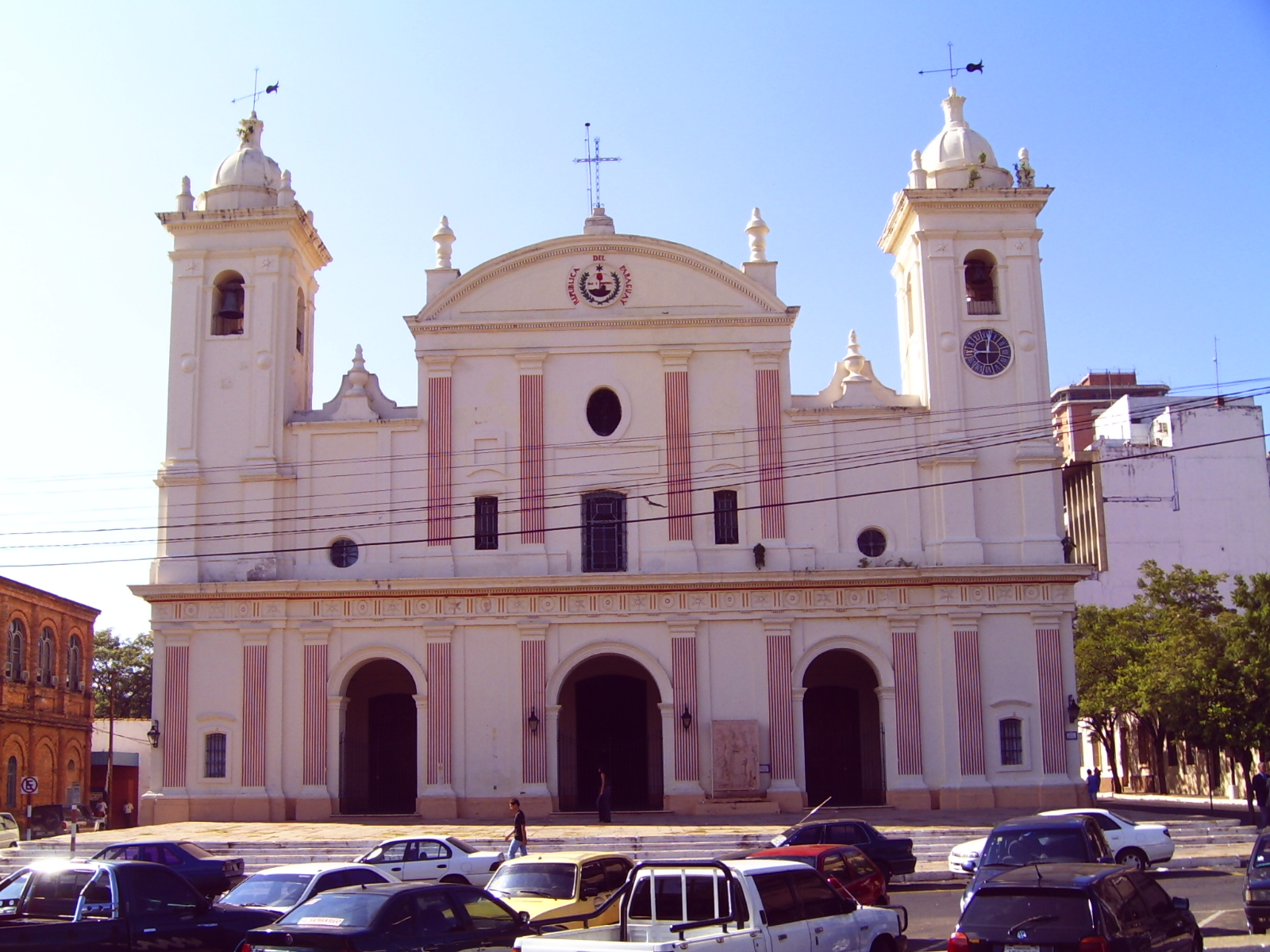
Metropolitan Cathedral of Our Lady of the Assumption in Asunción

== Catholic ==
Cathedrals of the Catholic Church in Paraguay:

- Metropolitan Cathedral of Our Lady of the Assumption in Asunción
- Cathedral of St. Rose of Lima in Benjamin Aceval
- Catedral Nuestra Senora de los Milagros in Caacupe
- Cathedral of the Immaculate Conception of Mary in Carapeguá
- Cathedral of Saint Blaise in Ciudad del Este
- Cathedral of the Immaculate Conception of Mary in Concepción
- Cathedral of Our Lady of the Rosary in Coronel Oviedo
- Cathedral of the Incarnation in Encarnación
- Mary Help of Christians Cathedral, Fuerte Olimpo
- Cathedral of St. John the Baptist in San Juan Bautista de las Misiones
- Cathedral of St. Lawrence in San Lorenzo
- Cathedral of St. Peter in San Pedro de Ycuamandiyú
- St. Claire Cathedral, Villarrica

== See also ==
- List of cathedrals
