= Bahía Negra =

- District
- Location within Paraguay
- Country: Paraguay
- Department: Alto Paraguay
- Time zone: UTC-3 (PYT)

Bahía Negra is a district in the department of Alto Paraguay, Paraguay. Located on the right bank of the Paraguay River its population count is estimated to be around 2537, as of 2023.

== Location ==
Bahía Negra is located in the northeastern extreme of the Alto Paraguay department, about 137 km north of Fuerte Olimpo, which is the departmental capital. Bahía Negra is located at the coordinates 20°15'00"S 58°12'00"W and at an altitude of 75 m above sea level. As its name suggests, the geographical feature is a "bay," or rather, a wide bend formed by the Paraguay River moving westward, i.e., into the Chaco Boreal. The Chacoan margins have relatively high cliffs where stable hamlets have been established, whereas the eastern margins (now Brazilian) are low and largely covered by wetlands that are a southern extension of the Great Pantanal.

This point is a few kilometers southwest of the current tri-border area between Bolivia, Brazil, and Paraguay, to the north of Bahía Negra, and forming part of the border with Bolivia, runs erratically between the Otuquis wetlands, the river of the same name, which would later be called the Bambural River (by Bolivia) or Negro River (by Paraguay), in the north of the Boreal Chaco.

== Climate ==
The climate of Bahía Negra can be classified as a tropical savanna climate (Aw), according to the Köppen climate classification.

== History ==
The indigenous peoples inhabiting the area at the arrival of the Spaniards in the 16th century were the Iśir (commonly called Zamucos or Chamacocos), some Guarani or Guarani-assimilated groups such as the Itatines, and later the Pampids (commonly called Kadiwéu).

The first Spaniards to reach these territories were those of the expeditions led by Captains Juan de Ayolas and his lieutenant Domingo Martínez de Irala, who founded the fort of La Candelaria on February 2, 1537, in the southern area of the great "Jarayes Lagoon"—on a map from 1600, it is located opposite the future Fuerte Olimpo, south of the mouth of the Brazilian Nabileque River that rejoins the Paraguay River forming an island, but it could also have been between the latitudes 21° S and 19° S, possibly located at the midpoint, near Bahía Negra— but it was depopulated in August of the same year. Later, in 1542, Irala passed through the area again, who further north and in the northern area of the same great lagoon —now La Gaiba— founded the city called "Puerto de los Reyes" on January 6, 1543, but it was also abandoned on March 23, 1544, by order of then adelantado Álvar Núñez Cabeza de Vaca, and in its vicinity, in September 1568, the founder of Santa Cruz de la Sierra, Ñuflo de Chaves, was killed.

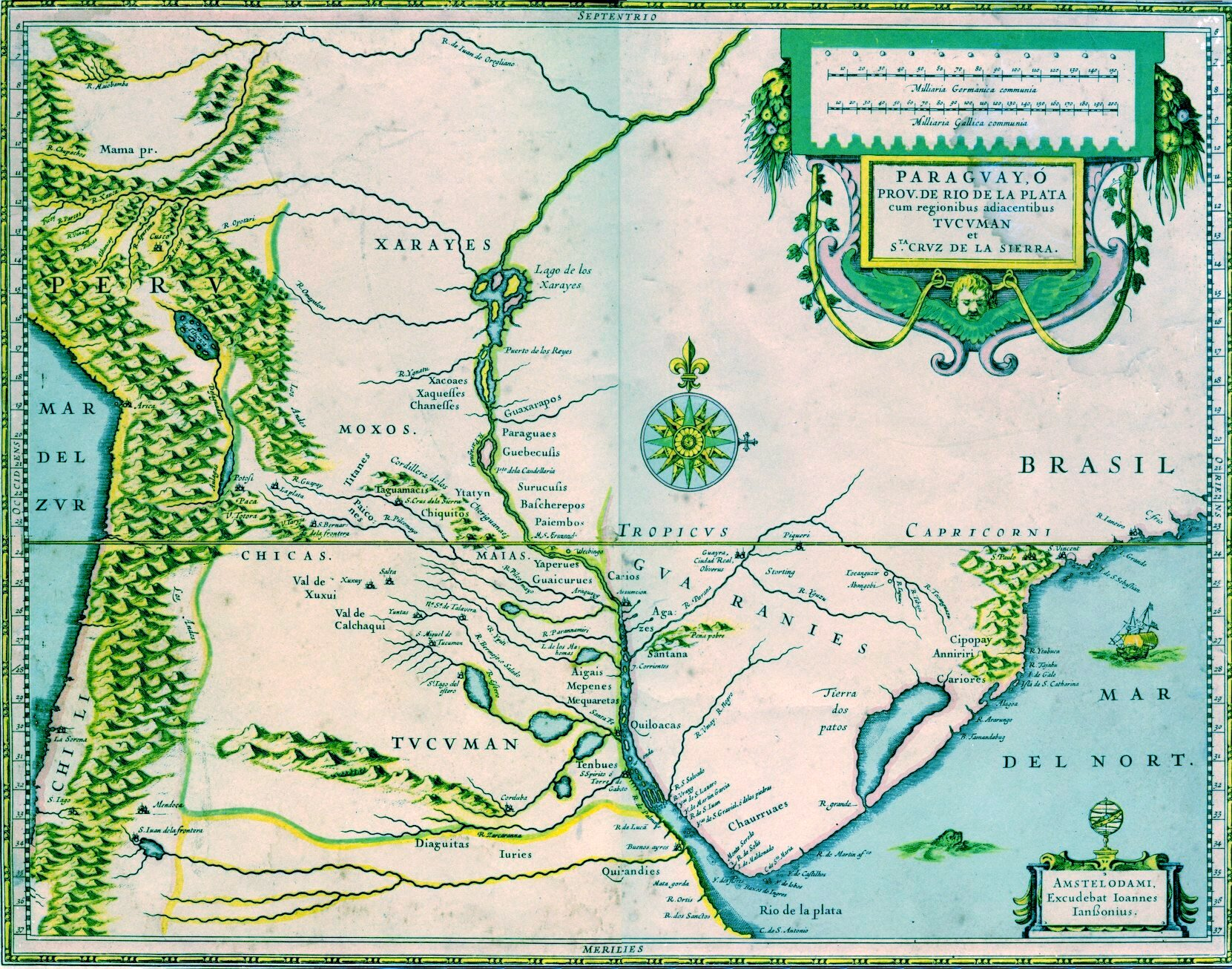
Viceroyalty of Peru, on a map from 1600, with the governorates of Tucumán and Río de la Plata and Paraguay with the location of the "Puerto de La Candelaria" south of the Nabileque River in front of the future Fort Olimpo, and the "Puerto de los Reyes”, south of the current La Gaiba lagoon.

The 17th century marked the beginning of the Bandeirantes incursions from Brazil, which caused the Spaniards of the Paraguayan governorate to abandon the city of Santiago de Jerez in 1640 and the Jesuit missions of the Itatín region in 1659, leading to the last two survivors setting up in the Boreal Chaco: San Ignacio de Caaguazú III or Itaty —about 8 km northwest of present-day Bahía Negra— and Nuestra Señora de Fe III —about 12 km from the current Puerto Esperanza and 20 km southwest of Bahía Negra— both destroyed by the Guaycurúes in 1674, and later the Franciscan reduction of San Ignacio de Zamucos (1724-1745) —about 10 km north of the modern Fortín Ravelo of Bolivia from 1931, in the present Bolivian Chaco and around 20 km from the border with Paraguay— would also be destroyed, leading to the erection of seventeen fortifications on the western bank and two on the eastern bank of the Paraguay River in 1761, although these last two did not last long, all around Bahía Negra, to which were later added, the Franciscan reduction of Nuestra Señora del Refugio de Egilechigó (1769) or after its abandonment in 1775, the "Fort Itapucú" (1776-ca.1789) —these latter 15 km northwest of the future Fuerte Olimpo— which was erected by the Luso-Brazilian foundation of the fort of Coimbra in 1775, and once abandoned, would monitor the Paraguayan border of the Spanish Viceroyalty of the Río de la Plata, the Fort Borbón founded in 1792. From the previously mentioned fortifications in 1806 only thirteen remained: Angostura, Boquerón, Herradura, Ibioca, Lambaré, Lobato, Macaimpam, Ñeembucú, Remolinos, San Antonio, San Fernando, Tacuaras, and Villeta, which would be abandoned around 1811.

Following the proclamation of independence of Paraguay, this new state claimed jurisdiction over the Boreal Chaco up to the previous limits of the Viceroyalty of the Río de la Plata with Brazil, that is, up to the Jaurú River, however, Brazilian military pressure made the effective Paraguayan limit by 1864 be found at the Negro or Bambural River of the northern Boreal Chaco.

The conclusion of the War of the Triple Alliance jeopardized this limit since Brazil occupied the banks of the Paraguay River and demanded on the Chaco side as the southern limit, the 20º S parallel. Through the "Muñoz-López Netto" treaty with Bolivia on March 27, 1867, it renounced its litigation over the territory located between the Verde River and Bahía Negra.

Gregorio Pacheco, who was the president of the Republic of Bolivia, with the aim of incorporating the remote territories and even those litigated with the neighboring Republic of Paraguay, founded on July 16, 1885, the then Puerto Pacheco, located on the right bank of the Paraguay River. In 1888, Paraguayan forces aboard the gunboat Pirapo, commanded by Captain Domingo Antonio Ortiz, evicted the Bolivians and occupied the said port.

The Paraguayan president Patricio Escobar, diplomatically supported by Argentina, defended Paraguayan sovereignty in the area but it would be returned to Bolivia in 1894. However, after the Acre War and the subsequent Treaty of Petrópolis of 1903 between Bolivia and Brazil, as "compensation" for the territories that Brazil obtained from Bolivia and Peru, the Brazilian state "recognized" the "full Bolivian sovereignty" over the Boreal Chaco, although Brazil did not possess any rights south of latitude 19° S, omitting the protests of the then Paraguayan president Juan Antonio Escurra, made between 1902 and 1904.

In 1907 the port was annexed by Paraguayan forces and recovered by the Bolivian army in 1915, this would be one of the triggers for the very bloody Chaco War in which both litigating republics were involved, from September 9, 1932, to June 12, 1935. The conclusion of that war meant the definitive recognition of Paraguayan sovereignty over the now renamed Bahía Negra.

On April 25, 2005, the creation of the municipality of Bahía Negra was approved by Law 2,563/05, thus becoming municipality number 233 of Paraguay.

== Economy ==
There is a river port, warehouses for the collection of regional products, some establishments for the basic industrialization of regional production (wood, soybean, leather), modest fishing, and significant cattle ranching activity. There is also some potential for ecotourism (on the border with Bolivia, there is the Río Negro national park where jaguars, caimans, capybaras, peccaries, mbeorís, black howler monkeys, maned wolves, guazú pucús, pumas, and giant otters can be found).

== See also ==
- Districts of Paraguay
