= Chamacoco language =

Zamucoan language

Chamacoco
- Ishír
- Native to: Paraguay
- Region: Alto Paraguay
- Ethnicity: Chamacoco
- Native speakers: 2,000 (2015)
- Language family: Zamucoan: Chamacoco

Language codes
- ISO 639-3: ceg
- Glottolog: cham1315
- ELP: Chamacoco

A speaker of Chamacoco, also known as Ishír/Yshyr.

Chamacoco is a Zamucoan language spoken in Paraguay by the Chamacoco people. It is also known as Xamicoco or Xamacoco, although the tribe itself prefers the name Ishír (which is also spelled Ɨshɨr, Ishiro, Yshyr) and sometimes Jewyo. When the term Ishiro (or yshyro or ɨshɨro) is used to refer to the language, it is an abbreviation for Ishir(o) ahwoso, literally meaning 'the words, the language of the Chamacoco people'. It is spoken by a traditionally hunter-gatherer society that now practices agriculture. Its speakers are of all ages, and generally speak Spanish or Guarani as second and third languages.

== Classification ==
Chamacoco is classified as a Zamucoan language, along with Ayoreo. Both languages are considered endangered. There is relatively little information about the Zamucoan family.

Chamacoco speakers live in the northeastern part of the Chaco Boreal at the origin of the Río Verde in Paraguay. Four dialects of Chamacoco have been identified: Héiwo, in the Fuerte Olimpo area; Ebidóso and Hório, spoken in the Bahía Negra region; and Tomaráho, in the Alto Paraná Atlantic forests.

The speakers of Hório and Ebidóso were estimated to be 800 in 1970. Fewer than 200 people spoke Tomaráho then. Back in 1930, over 2000 people were estimated to speak Chamacoco.

Verb inflection is based on personal prefixes and the language is tenseless. For example, chɨpɨrme teu dosh means "the kingfisher eats fish", while chɨpɨra teu wichɨ dosht means "the kingfisher will eat fish." Nouns can be divided into possessable and non-possessable. Possessable nouns are characterized by a prefixation whereby the noun agrees with the possessor or genitival modifier. There is no difference between nouns and adjectives in suffixation. The syntax is characterized by the presence of para-hypotactical structures. The comparison of inflectional morphology has shown remarkable similarities with Ayoreo and Ancient Zamuco.

An Ɨshɨr (Chamacoco) Living Dictionary is currently under construction, spearheaded by Living Tongues Institute for Endangered Languages. This project is being curated in close collaboration with Ɨshɨr language activists such as Andres Ozuna Ortiz. There is also the Chamacoco Talking Dictionary, supported by Living Tongues Institute for Endangered Languages, National Geographic, and Swarthmore College; the lattermost of the three provides the website.

== Phonology ==
=== Vowels ===
Vowels
	Front	Central	Back
Close	i	ɨ	u
Near-close	ɪ		
Mid	e	ə	ɔ
Open	a		ɑ

All vowels except for /ɑ, ə/ have nasalized forms.

=== Consonants ===
Consonants
		Bilabial	Alveolar	Post-alveolar	Velar	Glottal
Stop/Affricate	voiceless	p	t	t͡ʃ	k	ʔ
Stop/Affricate	voiced	b	d	d͡ʒ	g	
Fricative	voiceless		s	ʃ		h
Fricative	voiced		z	ʒ	ɣ	
Nasal		m	n			
Approximant	plain		ɹ		w	
Approximant	lateral		l			
Trill			r			

== Breakdown of sample phrases ==
"Dechiet na ye tɨtɨr ayeh pe" - "Yesterday I did not go to the field".

The structure ye (VERB) pe negates the verb; compare the following sentence:

"Deychet hna ye etɨr aych pe" - "Yesterday you did not go to the field".

"Tɨtɨr ayech" (with alternatives being tɨtɨr ayeh) means "I go to the field", while "dechiet" (deychet, dɨltyetna) means yesterday.

Verb conjugation heavily relies on prefixes rather than, for example, Spanish's usage of suffix conjugation. Another example of the negation format in action is:

"Wɨchɨ ye taakpe" - "He does not eat". Here, "taak" (takak, taka) is the verb being affected.
