= Chamacoco =

Chamacoco Ishír
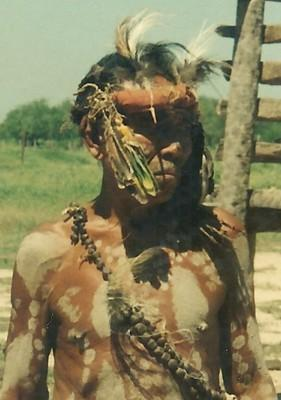
- Konzehet Faustino (ebytoso) Pto. Esperanza (1990)

Total population
- 1,800 (2007)

Regions with significant populations
- Paraguay; Brazil (Mato Grosso do Sul)

Languages
- Chamacoco

Religion
- traditional tribal religion, Christianity

The Chamacoco people (Ishír) are an Indigenous people of Paraguay. Some also live in Brazil.

The Chamacoco have two major divisions, the Ebytoso, who lived along the Paraguay River, and the Tomáraho, who traditionally lived in the forests. The Ebytoso converted to Christianity, while the Tomáraho have lived in marginal areas in order to preserve their traditional world views and lifeways. In the 1980s the Instituto Nacional del Indigena (INDI) resettled the Tomáraho in a community called Puerto Esperanza with the Ebytoso. The Chamacoco people are one of many Indigenous groups in the Gran Chaco who are impacted by the devastating effects of deforestation in the region.

== Name ==
The Chamacoco are also known as the Ishiro, Yshiro, Jeywo, Yshyro, Xamicoco, Xamacoco, or Yshyr people. Their autonym is Ishír. The term ɨshɨr (also spelled Ishir or Yshyr) properly means 'person', but now is also used with the meaning of 'Indigenous' in opposition to the Paraguayan people, who are called Maro.

== Population ==
According to the 2002 census the population yshyr in Paraguay that identified themselves as yshyr was 1571 people, mainly located in the district of Fuerte Olimpo in Paraguay, being the largest migrant group which is in the district Ygatimí (85 in 2002). According to data from the brazilian Social and Environmental Institute (ISA), in 1994, 40 individuals were living in the Indian Reservation of Kadiwéu in Brazil.

During the 80's, the yshyr were displaced from their lands and relocated by the National Indigenous Institute of Paraguay (INDI) confining them to small riparian areas. In 1986 the tomáraho were moved from San Carlos to Potrerito, to land belonging to the ybytoso, and later were given land in Maria Elena.

== Language ==
A Yshyr speaker, recorded in the United States.

Yshyr (chamacoco) people speak the yshyr, a Zamuco language. The designation "chamacoco" is probably related to "chamóc" or "zamúc," the ethnonym for the group of the Zamuco Family. The language is called Yshyr ahwoso (also spelled ɨshɨr ahwoso) by the speakers.

Yshyr language was studied and described by the Jesuits in the eighteenth century, and includes the dialects tomáraho (or tomaraxa), ybytoso (or ebitoso) and orio.

In 1930 it was estimated that about 2,000 people spoke some variety of language. The speakers of the variants ybytoso and orio were estimated at 800 in 1970, while fewer than 200 people spoke Tomáraho in that times. The yshyr language is considered endangered by the UNESCO and could disappear in a few generations, under pressure from the culturally dominant languages in the region, like Spanish and guaraní.

The language shows remarkable morphological similarities with Ayoreo. Possessed nouns agree in person with the possessor. Chamacoco presents rare para-hypotactical structures, also documented at an early stage of many romance languages.

== History ==
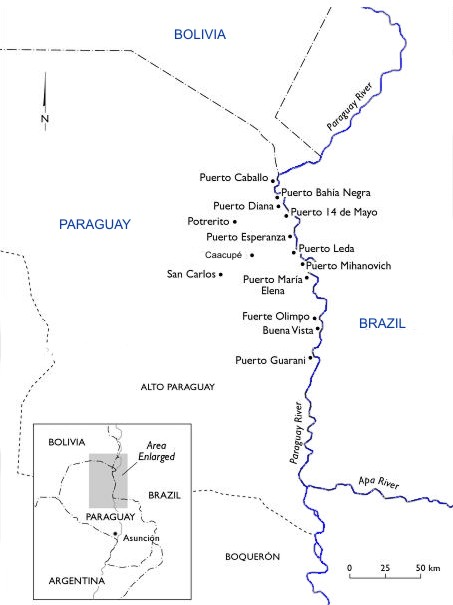
Map of settlements in the Paraguay River

Several ysyr groups lived in the Gran Chaco in the nineteenth century, both inside the territory, and settled on the banks of the Paraguay River. The ybytosos (or ebitosos) have lived for centuries along the Paraguay River, the tomárahos, lived inside the Gran Chaco and until the 1970s were believed to be hostile.

During the Chaco War (1932–35), the yshyr fought alongside Paraguayan soldiers against the Bolivians, but when the war ended, they lost their territories and had to negotiate ethnic survival with the Paraguayan settlers.

The remaining tomáraho were living in debt slavery in the remote San Carlos logging camp—and were dying from disease, neglect, and starvation. Whereas the ebytoso had abandoned their rituals as a result of pressure from evangelical missionaries belonging to the New Tribes Mission, the tomáraho still practiced the boys initiation ceremony and had retained a detailed knowledge of myth and shamanism.

“Now our territory is that of the company”, a tomáraho man said, “we live there but it isn’t ours; it does not belong to us and has become an enemy place that is killing us off. Before we were brave and strong, but cohabitation with Paraguayans has tamed us” The Tomáraho worked in the logging camps of the tannin company Carlos Casado and barely survived, ill and malnourished.

Their first contact with the ebytoso was in 1981, when Bruno Barrás and Guillermo Mallero, Ishir from Fuerte Olimpo, walked to San Carlos to carry out the first National Indigenous Census. When Escobar visited the tomáraho in 1985 they numbered only 87 people.

These groups are now on the verge of disappearing due to the poverty resulting from the transformation of their habitat, degradation of natural resources, and the pressure out of the expansion of economic activity. Young people move to the cities of Paraguay and Brazil, abandoning their beliefs and often denying their origin to avoid being victims of discrimination.

In 2009, only three ybytoso communities had legal status and own land, the tomáraho community and has legal status and allocated land without legal property (DGEEC, 2004) with a total of 25,828 hectares. The largest populations are in Puerto Diana and Puerto Esperanza, the smallest in Puerto Caballo.

== Economy ==
Traditionally, the Chamacoco were hunter-gatherers. Currently, they farm and raise animals, such as sheep, goats, pigs, cows, horses, and poultry. They work as ranch hands, day laborers, and domestic servants. They create crafts for sale such as baskets, wood carvings, and other creations.

Yshyr dissident groups, known as "yacareceros" are engaged in alligator poaching, a prohibited activity, to survive. "contingents of fifteen to twenty men leave in canoes up the river, and interns by the marshlands of río Negro. They hunt for a month, sleeping in their boats and exposed to all dangers: Brazilian rangers, most of them ex-convicts, use to shoot to kill before asking".

== Mythology ==
While stories told by ybytoso differ from that from Tomáraho in many respects, the "Big Myth" yshyr can be summarized as follows:

On the occasion of traveling through the jungle, a group of yshyr women met the ahnapzöro (or anapsoro), powerful and terrible gods, strange-looking, that had no factions in their faces. Each of them had different unique characters, covered with feathers, hair, or strange colors. The ahnapsoro lived then with yshyr, and taught them to hunt, use tools, and initiated them in their ritual ceremonies.

After a while the coexistence of men and gods became difficult, reaching a crisis with the death of some young people in the harsh initiation ceremonies. Then Eshönewörta (or Ashnuwerta), a leading ahnapzoro, showed the yshyr the vulnerability of the ahnapzoro, so they could kill them by beating them at the ankle, as that there they had there throat.

In a short time all the ahnapzoro had been exterminated. only two survived the slaughter: Eshönewörta and the fearsome Nemur, who escaped. When Nemur felt the human drawing up on him, they were already in the place called Karcha Balut he scooped up a snail from the soil or pulled it from his body's thick plumage (depending on the versions) and with an extravagant gesture produced a raging river that sprouted out of its shell.

The man and the ahnapzoro, separated by the river known today as the Paraguay River, "exchange words" for the last time. "You can run, but your destiny is to remain forever alone", pronounces Syr, standing on the riverbank. "Your people are numerous", replies Nemur from the opposite bank, "but they will be forever obliged to follow the words. If they fail, sickness, hunger, and enemies will decimate then until the last Kytymaraha (name of the clan of Syr) is extinguished".

There is another mythical institution that promotes the balanced use of natural resources: the figure of the Master of the Animals. Every animal has its master its balut, spokesperson, who simultaneously facilitates hunting and severely sanctions its excess.
