= Aguaray-Guazú River =

Aguaray-Guazú River may refer to:

- Aguaray-Guazú River (Jejuí Guazú River), Paraguay
- Aguaray-Guazú River (Paraguay River), Paraguay
