= Fort Borbon =

Fuerte Olimpo
- Flag Coat of arms

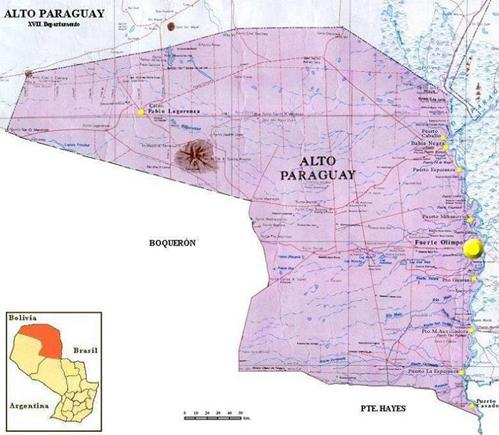
- Coordinates: 21°2′0″S 57°54′0″W
- Country: Paraguay
- Department: Alto Paraguay
- Founded: September 25, 1792
- Elevation: 64 m (210 ft)

Population
  - Total: 4,498
- Time zone: -3 Gmt
- Postal code: 9000

Fort Borbón is a fort located in the Paraguayan Chaco; it was established to provide protection from the natives and Portuguese. After the Portuguese were expelled by Gaspar Rodríguez de Francia, it was changed to its present name Fort Olimpo.

== History ==
Initially, Fort Borbón was established as a guard post by order of King Carlos IV of Spain with the purpose of withstanding attacks by the natives and the Portuguese on the lands under Spanish jurisdiction. On October 17, 1791, Viceroy of Río de la Plata ordered the creation of Fort Borbón.

The governor of the province of Paraguay, Joaquín Alós y Brú, ordered the establishment of two forts in the north: Borbón and San Carlos del Apa to restrict the advance of the cavalry. To this effect he ordered the commander of Villa de Concepción to prepare food supplies and other elements for the troops who would march from Asunción to those places.

Fort Borbón was founded on September 25, 1792 by the King’s Chief of Dragoons (cavalry), José Antonio Zavala y Delgadillo, with José de Isasi as its first commander.

The Mbayá and Guaná natives inhabited the lands near the fort, and there was always distrust among them. The natives were encouraged by the Portuguese to steal and murder the people in the Spanish states. The stolen cattle were then sold to the Portuguese in exchange for weapons and liquor.

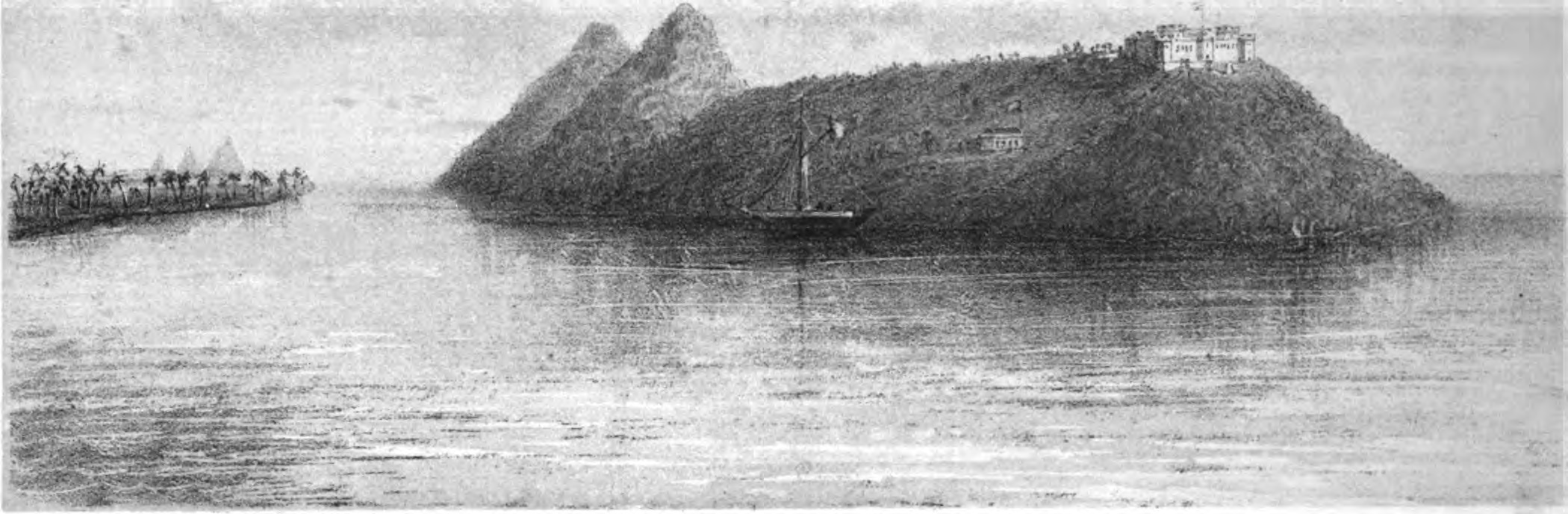
View of Fort Borbon.

The Spanish tried to gain the friendship of the caciques (chiefs of the tribe) mbayás but they attacked Villa Real de Concepción in 1796, and because of it the military forces in the village massacred the families of the natives settled nearby, killing about 75 of them.

With the passing time, the interactions between the natives and the soldiers of Fort Borbón and Villa de Concepción became friendlier, and the authorities of Asunción signed temporary peace treaties with Chief Lorenzo.

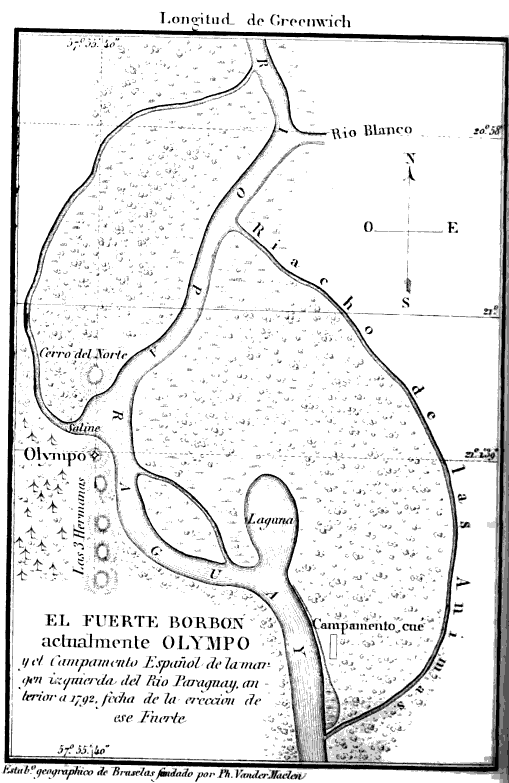
Fort Borbon.

In spite the temporarily friendly arrangements, the owners of state in Concepción continued to suffer because the siege of several Mbayá tribes kept the village in a state of constant danger.

Borbón was fortified. Once the news of the war in 1801 between Spain and Portugal became public, Governor Lázaro de Rivera proposed pointlessly to take the Portuguese fort of Coimbra and settle more to the north in the lands of the Spanish Crown.

Maintaining the 100 soldiers stationed in Borbón became more difficult as time passed, due to the long distance and the lack of communication.

The history of the fort records episodes of hunger, misery and abandon. Shipments of food from Concepción were irregular and insufficient.

There are records that troops from the fort participated in the 1810 fight against the invasion of general Belgrano. On that occasion, the fort was abandoned; the Mbayás took possession of it and later also the Brazilian forces of Coimbra. The Junta Superior Gubernativa (Superior Government Council), instituted by the revolutionaries in 1811 after the independence of the country, called Fernando de la Mora to recover the fort by force, which was not necessary because the Portuguese retreated and it was given back to the Paraguayans.

During the dictatorship of Rodríguez de Francia, around 1817, the fort was reinforced with a stone wall three kilometers long and new housing was built for the occupants.

== Current times ==
Since 1823, was renamed as Fort Olimpo in demonstration of the breaking bonds with the Spanish Crown.

Nowadays, the remains of the impressive defensive wall can still be found, and from the top of it, it’s possible to have a strategic view of the Paraguay River.

With the new political distribution in 1992, the town of Fort Olimpo became the capital of the Alto Paraguay department and this, the place of the town council. It comprehends the districts of Puerto La Victoria (previously named Puerto Casado) and Mayor Pablo Lagerenza.
