= Cathedral of Saint Blaise =

- Catedral San Blas
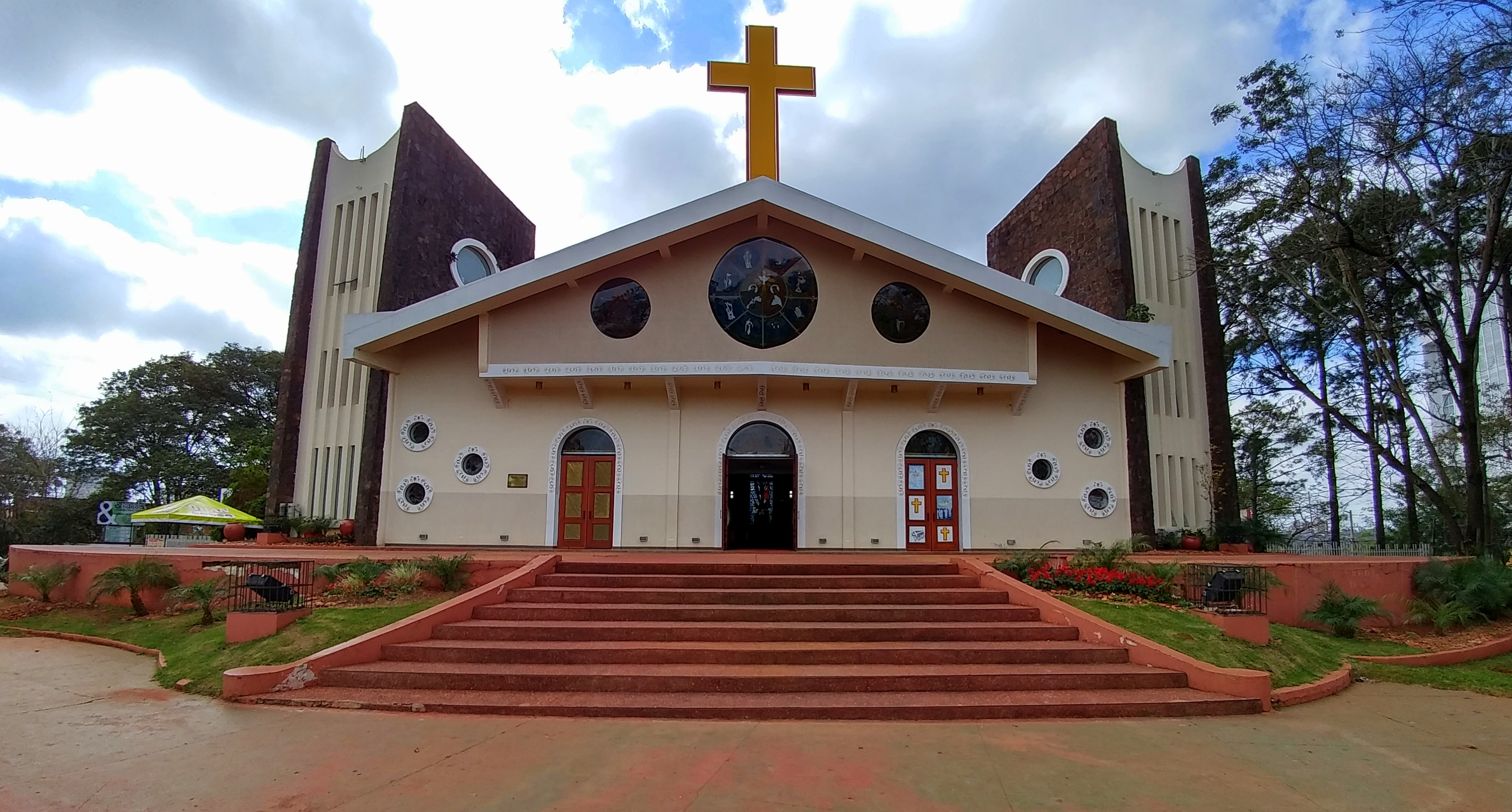
- Cathedral of Saint Blaise
- 25°30′35″S 54°36′40″W
- Location: Ciudad del Este
- Country: Paraguay
- Denomination: Roman Catholic

Architecture
- Architect: Javier Quezada
- Years built: 1963–1964

Administration
- Province: Asunción
- Diocese: Ciudad del Este

The Cathedral of Saint Blaise (Spanish: Catedral San Blas) is a Roman Catholic cathedral located in the city of Ciudad del Este, Paraguay. It is the seat of the Roman Catholic Diocese of Ciudad del Este. The cathedral is dedicated to Saint Blaise, the patron of the city and country.

== History ==
In 1963, Bolivian architect Javier Quezada was hired to design a cathedral for the city. The structure was designed to resemble a ship and was completed in 1964. In 2023, the cathedral was the site of the celebration of the fifty-forth anniversary of the formation of the diocese, which was attended by Paraguayan cardinal Adalberto Martínez.

== See also ==
- Roman Catholicism in Paraguay
- List of cathedrals in Paraguay
