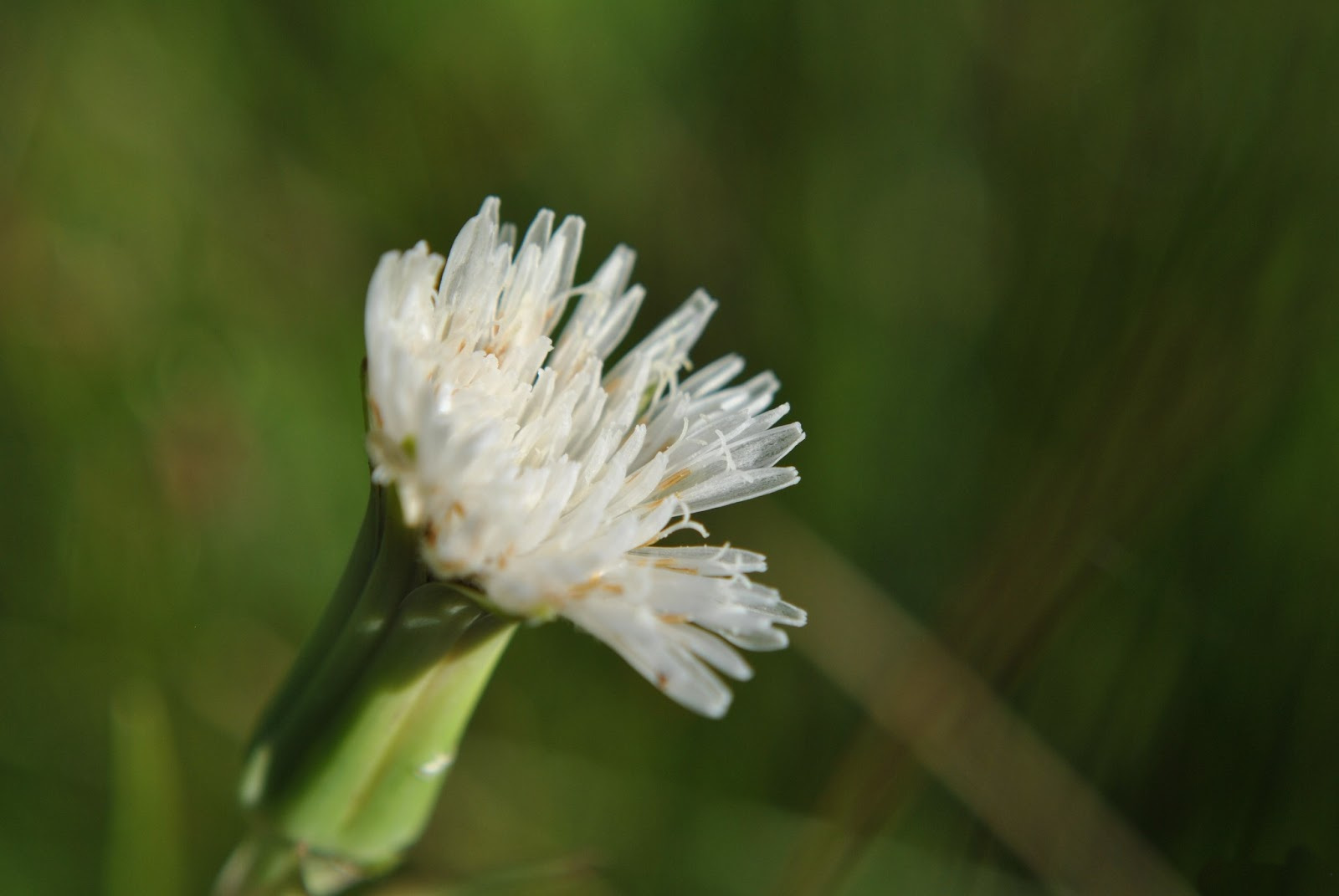
- Picrosia longifolia

Scientific classification
- Kingdom: Plantae
- Clade: Tracheophytes
- Clade: Angiosperms
- Clade: Eudicots
- Clade: Asterids
- Order: Asterales
- Family: Asteraceae
- Subfamily: Cichorioideae
- Tribe: Cichorieae
- Subtribe: Microseridinae
- Genus: Picrosia; D.Don

Type species
- Picrosia longifolia D.Don

Synonyms
- Psilopogon Phil.

= Picrosia =

Genus of flowering plants

Picrosia is a genus of South American plants in the tribe Cichorieae within the family Asteraceae.

Species

- Picrosia cabreriana A.G.Schulz - Brazil (Paraná, Rio Grande do Sul, Santa Catarina), Paraguay (Amambay), Argentina (Chaco, Corrientes, Misiones)
- Picrosia longifolia D.Don - northern + southern Argentina, Chile (Tarapaca), Paraguay (Alto Paraguay, Central, Presudente Hayes, San Pedro), Uruguay (Montevideo), Peru (Lima), Brazil (Rio Grande do Sul, Santa Catarina)
