= Mary Help of Christians Cathedral, Fuerte Olimpo =

Mary Help of Christians Cathedral
- Catedral de María Auxiliadora
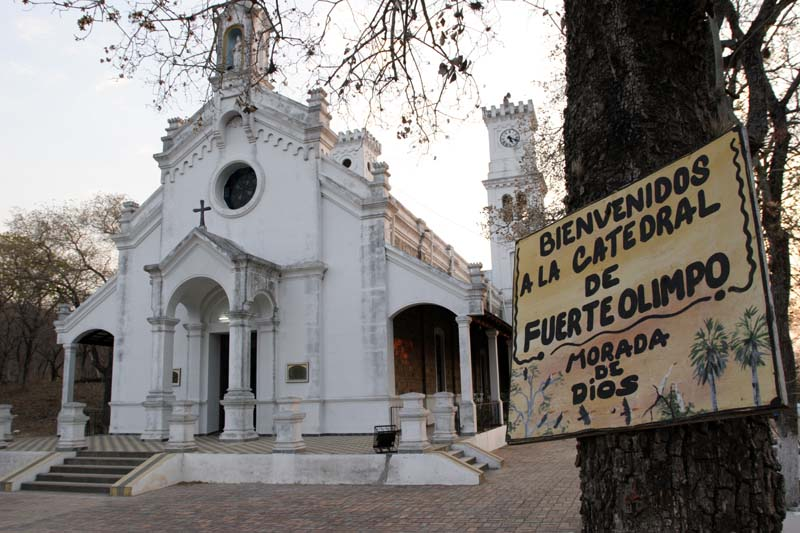
- Mary Help of Christians Cathedral
- Location: Fuerte Olimpo
- Country: Paraguay
- Denomination: Roman Catholic Church

The Mary Help of Christians Cathedral (Spanish: Catedral de María Auxiliadora ) also called Fuerte Olimpo Cathedral is the name given to a temple belonging to the Catholic Church and is located in the city of Fuerte Olimpo the capital of the department of Alto Paraguay in northern part of South American country of Paraguay, near the border with Brazil.

The temple follows the Roman or Latin rite and functions as the headquarters of the Apostolic Vicariate of Chaco Paraguayo (Vicariatus Apostolicus Ciachensis in Paraquaria Natione) which was created in March 1948 with the Bull "Quo in Paraguayana" of Pope Pius XII.

The present structure was started in 1920 but was paralyzed by lack of funds, retomandose work in 1949 and be completed in 1965 under the leadership of Bishop Angel Muzzolon who is buried in the church.

It is under the pastoral responsibility of the Bishop Gabriel Escobar Narciso Ayala.

== See also ==
- Roman Catholicism in Paraguay
- St. Mary's Cathedral
