= Zamuco language =

Extinct Zamucoan language

Zamuco
- Ancient Zamuco
- Native to: Bolivia
- Ethnicity: Zamuco
- Extinct: (date missing)
- Language family: Zamucoan: Zamuco

Language codes
- ISO 639-3: None (mis)
- Glottolog: zamu1245

Zamuco is an extinct Zamucoan language recorded during the colonial era in the Jesuit Missions of Chiquitos in Bolivia. It is closely related to Ayoreo.
