= List of rivers of Paraguay =

This is a list of rivers in Paraguay.

== By drainage basin ==
This list is arranged by drainage basin, with respective tributaries indented under each larger stream's name.

=== La Plata Basin ===
- Paraná River
  - Paraguay River
    - Tebicuary River
    - Pilcomayo River
    - Salado River

    - Piribebuy River
    - Confuso River
    - Manduvirá River
    - Jejuy River
      - Yhagüy River
    - Aguaray-Guazú River
    - Negro River
      - Aguaray-Guazú River
    - Jejuí Guazú River
      - Curuguaty River
    - Monte Lindo River
    - Ypané River
    - Aquidabán River
    - Verde River
    - Apa River
    - Melo River
    - Tímane River
    - Bamburral River or Negro
  - Monday River
  - Acaray River
    - Yguazú River
  - Ytambey River
  - Carapá River

== See also ==
- Rivers of Paraguay
- List of rivers of the Americas by coastline
