= Holy Spirit Cathedral, Villarrica =

Holy Spirit Cathedral
- Catedral del Espíritu Santo
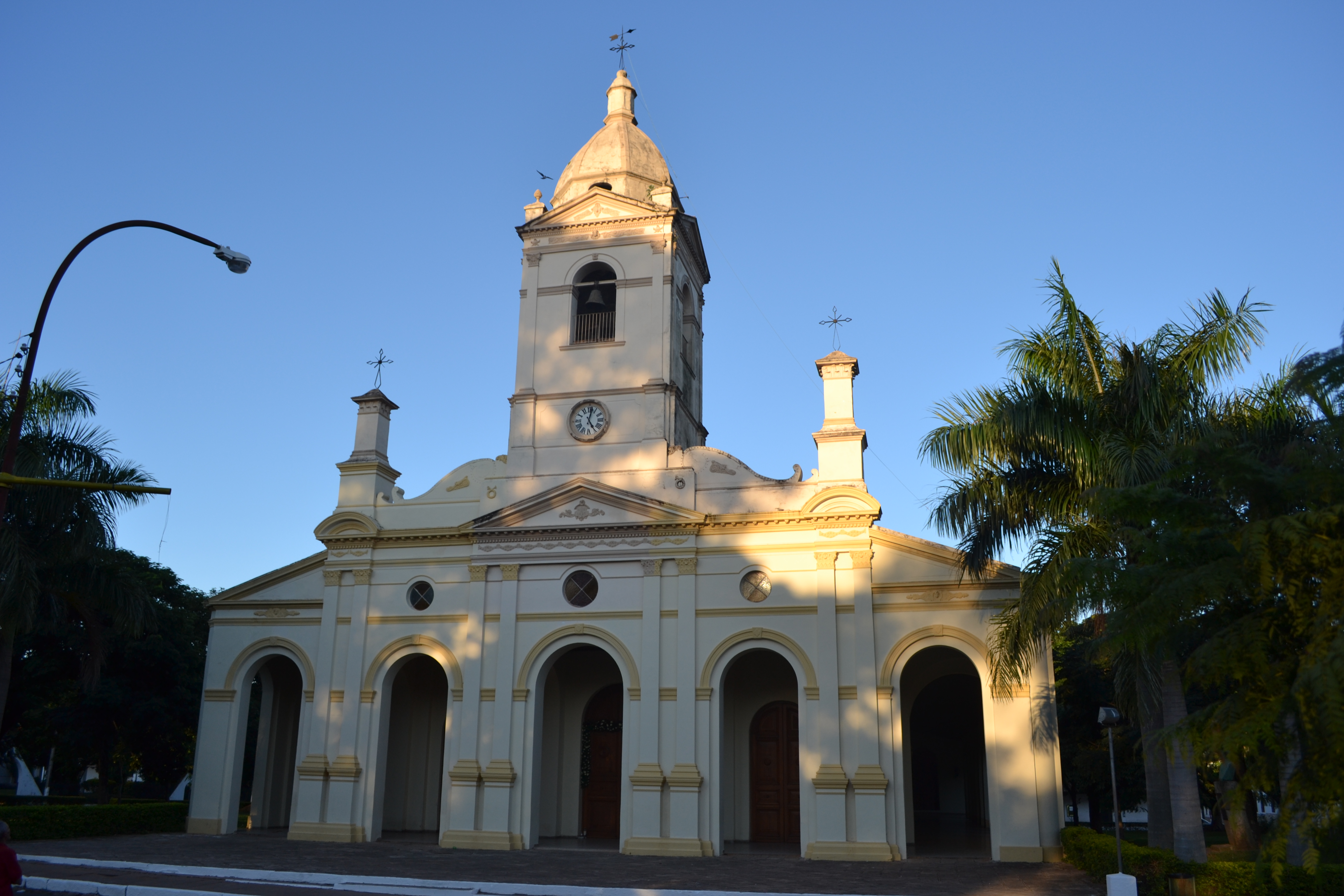
- Holy Spirit Cathedral
- 25.7824°S 56.4462°W
- Location: Villarrica
- Country: Paraguay
- Denomination: Roman Catholic Church

Architecture
- Architectural type: church

The Cathedral of the Holy Spirit (Spanish: Catedral del Espíritu Santo), also called Villarrica Cathedral, located in Villarrica in southern Paraguay, is the cathedral of the Roman Catholic Diocese of Villarrica del Espíritu Santo (Dioecesis Villaricensis Spiritus Sancti) Dedicated to the Holy Spirit, it is under the pastoral responsibility of the Bishop Ricardo Jorge Valenzuela Rios.

Its history dates back to 1683 when the Franciscans built a chapel in the same place. The current structure was completed in 1891, with a clock tower and three bells, the oldest of which was cast in 1781. It was elevated to cathedral status with the erection of the diocese with the 1929 bull "Universi Dominici" by Pope Pius XI.

== See also ==
- Catholic Church in Paraguay
