= Rivers of Paraguay =

The rivers of Paraguay have served, in the absence of usable roads, as natural ways to access the more remote Paraguayan territories. Some of them, the major tributaries of Paraguay and Parana, enabled navigation on a small scale, and smaller boats with limited use in times of drought due to decreasing flow of water flows.

== Tributaries of the Paraguay and Parana rivers ==
=== Paraguay river tributaries ===
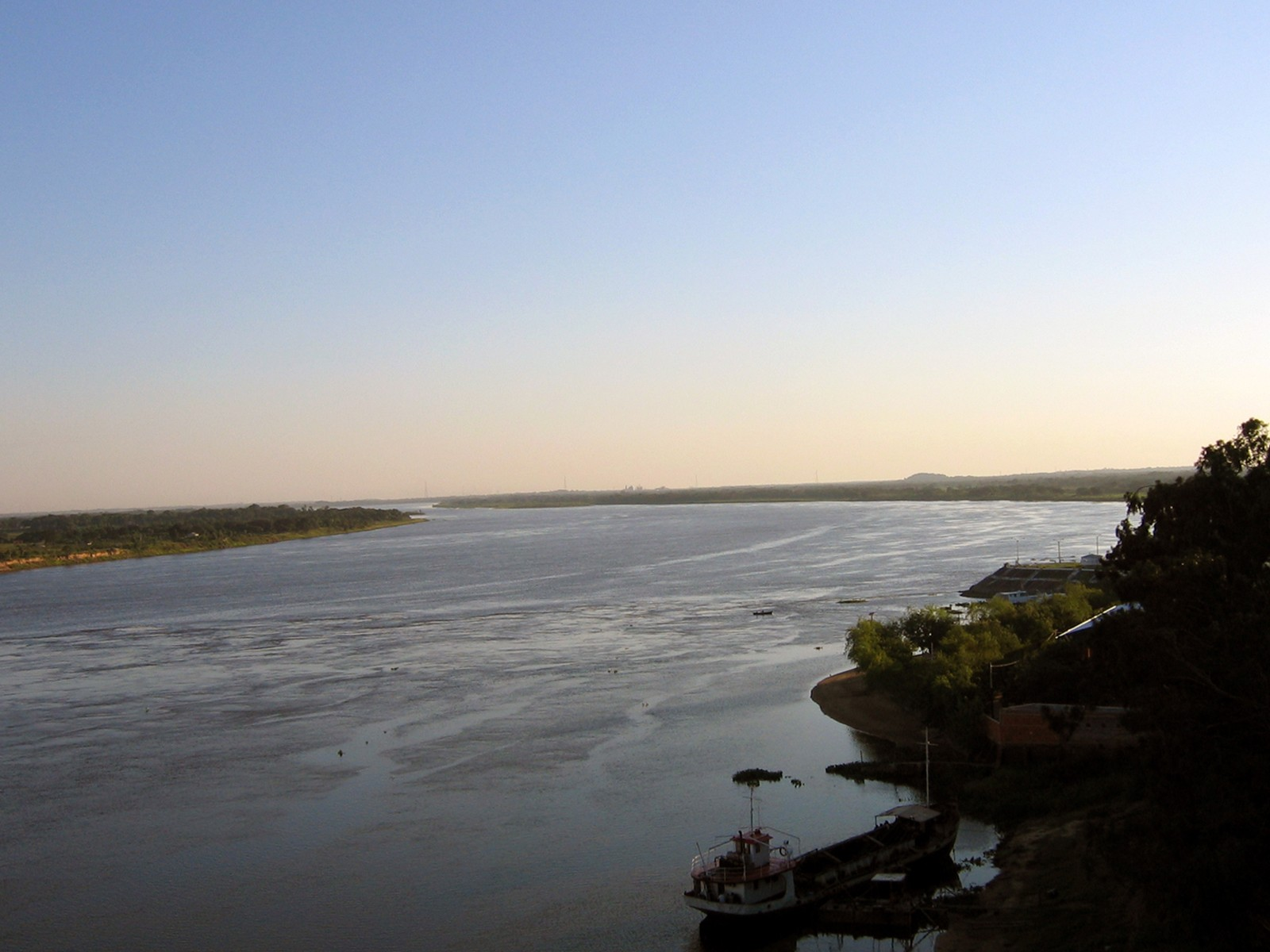
Ribera del Rio Paraguay

Among the subsidiaries of the left bank of the Paraguay River are:

==== The Jejui River ====
The Jejui River covers an area of approximately 350 km. It receives water from rivers Jejui-mi and the Jejui Guazú, in addition to substantial influx of the Aguaray River. Near its emerging flow together the Curuguaty River and the stream Itanará.

Historically it had strategic importance for Portuguese colonists, who continuously attempted to control this communication channel providing access to the Paraguay River, which was a fast way to reach the gold mines of Cuyabá.

The whole area surrounding the river was committed to defending the sovereignty of Paraguay in the delicate dispute with Portugal for the possession of the region that produced mate herb in Igatimí.

The town of Curuguaty is accessed by the Jejui River, when the water level allowed it. The overland journey from Asunción consumed much time because of the distance and natural difficulties of crossing jungles and rivers.

This town, like others in remote parts of the country, suffered from a sharp isolation. For that reason Curuguaty was chosen by the dictator José Gaspar Rodriguez de Francia as a place of imprisonment of the Uruguayan leader General Jose Gervasio Artigas when he applied for asylum in Paraguay.

==== Navigation ====
The river maintained in the past a greater flow by the regularity of rain and humidity sustained by its extensive forests. Until the middle of twentieth century it was common to observe in its lower reaches, the transit of boats transporting hardwoods and mate.

In the boom of the mate herb production there was a constant movement of small-size boats coming up ports of Itaba and Ysaú. The first was a major point of embarkation of mate, belonging to the powerful Paraguayan Industrial Company, established shortly after the Paraguayan War.

The river's opening, close to 24 degrees south latitude, was an active meeting place for traders engaged in the provision of goods for crews of boats and residents of neighboring villages. There workers spent their meager assets after they had worked for long months. There were piles of firewood in the canyons of the river—basic material for the operation of boilers and steam plants—and thousands of rolls of hardwood accumulated waiting to be shipped to ports below.

The loss of coastal mountains filled up the river's banks with wastes and this decreased the depth of its waters. Later, the construction of overland routes produced, moreover, the abandonment of this route as a means of communication.

==== The Manduvirá River ====
A similar phenomenon occurred with the Manduvirá River of 212 km long. arises in the Cordillera de los Altos and moves from east to west. For many years this was the alternative to reach isolated villages like Arroyos y Esteros. At the port of this population came small motor boats engaged in trade of national fruits and passengers transport. The Manduvirá ends in the Paraguay River, a short distance from Asunción, destiny of passengers and pedestrians who accompanied their loads of fruit, tobacco and alcohol.

==== Tebicuary River ====
The 235 km (146 mi) Tebicuary River drains at 23º30' south latitude. Long ago, such rivers served as communication between the area of Ñeembucú and the inland territories inside the old Jesuit missions. Through this river, smaller vessels entered to transport goods from Argentina, especially from Corrientes. They reached the passage of Santa Maria, current Villa Florida, where strong commercial firms were established. These firms engaged in distributing their merchandise to a variety of peoples. On their return, these boats carried cotton and firewood to the city of Pilar.

The first study of its geography was done by the Spanish naturalist Félix de Azara, who wrote a booklet on the details of the expedition conducted by his aides. The water channel suffered the same deterioration, as a result of the misuse of their sources and adjacent wetlands.

=== The principal Paraná River tributary ===
==== The Monday River ====
Among the tributaries of the Paraná River, the Monday River is significant, with an area of 170 km.

This river rises in the mountains of Caaguazú and poured water on the right bank of Paraná River, a short distance from the mouth of the River Iguazu.

There are recent references that flatboats and tugboats transported mate and wood in the short journey between the Caaguazú jungle factories. These were close to the famous Saltos del Monday, that ended in the Paraná River, where cargo was transferred to larger capacity ships.

== See also ==
- List of rivers of Paraguay
