= Manduvirá River =

Coordinates: 24°57′30″S 57°18′28″W

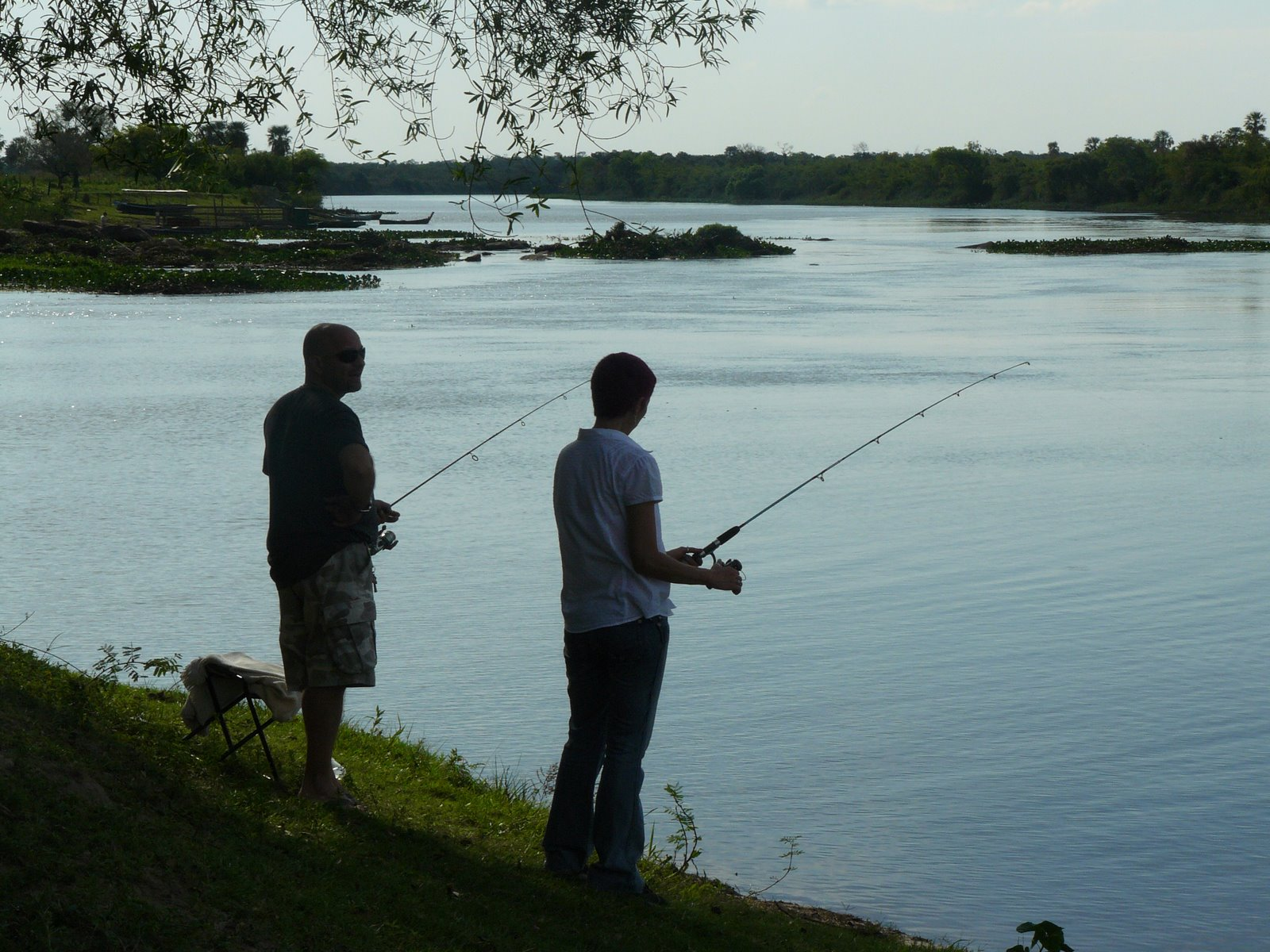

Location
- Country: Paraguay

Physical characteristics
- Mouth
  - location: Paraguay River

The Manduvirá River (Spanish: Río Manduvirá; Guarani: Ysyry Manduvira) is a river of Paraguay. It is a tributary of the Paraguay River.

== See also ==
- List of rivers of Paraguay
