= Ayoreo =

Indigenous people of Bolivia and Paraguay

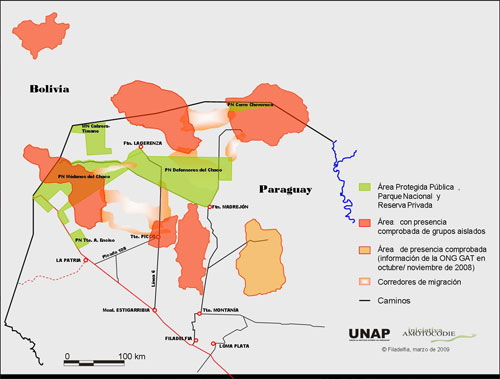
- Ayoreo Groups in Voluntary Isolation

Total population
- 4,789

Regions with significant populations
- Paraguay: 2,600
- Bolivia: 2,189

Languages
- Ayoreo • Spanish

Religion
- Traditional Religion • Christianity

The Ayoreo (Ayoreode, Ayoréo, Ayoréode) are an Indigenous people of the Gran Chaco. They live in an area surrounded by the Paraguay, Pilcomayo, Parapetí, and Grande Rivers, spanning both Bolivia and Paraguay. There are approximately 5,600 Ayoreo people in total. Around 3,000 live in Bolivia, and 2,600 live in Paraguay. Traditionally nomadic hunter-gatherers, the majority of the population was sedentarized by missionaries in the twentieth century. The few remaining uncontacted Ayoreo are threatened by deforestation and loss of territory.

== Name and language ==
The Ayoreo people are known by numerous names including Ayoré, Ayoreode, Guarañoca, Koroino, Moro, Morotoco, Poturero, Pyeta Yovai, Samococio, Sirákua, Takrat, Yanaigua and Zapocó. In the Ayoreo language, Ayoreo means “true people,” and Ayoreode means "human beings."

They speak the Ayoreo language, which is classified under Zamucoan, a small language family of Paraguay and Bolivia. A grammar and dictionary have been published for the language, and 20% of the Ayoreo are literate. Tsiracua is a dialect of Ayoreo.

== History ==
The Ayoreo were first contacted when the Jesuits started the San Ignacio Zamuco mission in the 1720s to convert the people to Catholicism. The mission was abandoned in the 1740s, and the Ayoreo were left alone until the 1900s. The Chaco War (1932-1935) between Bolivia and Paraguay brought 100,000 troops to their territory, as well as new diseases. Both countries viewed the Ayoreo as a problem, and from the 1940s until the 1970s the Paraguayan soldiers could be freed from service for killing an Ayoreo. Ayoreo children were stolen during this time, including a twelve-year-old named Iquebi who was taken to be put in an exhibit. In the 1940s the Santa Cruz-Corumba railroad was built in Ayoreo territory, making the territory and people easier to access.

Christian missionaries made contact with the Ayoreo in the late 1940s, first with the northern groups in Bolivia and then with the southern groups in Paraguay. The missionary groups were Catholic, Mennonite, and Evangelical, including the New Tribes Mission. Missionaries used force and manipulation to remove the Ayoreo from their land to various mission stations in the late 1950s. Afterwards, the land was purchased for cattle farming. The missionaries also brought diseases such as measles to the Ayoreo, leading to the death of many people. While at the mission stations, the Ayoreo had to adopt a sedentary lifestyle and give up their culture, including their religion, appearance, music, and diet. The missionaries sometimes convinced the Ayoreo living at the missions to find uncontacted Ayoreo in the forest to sedentarize and convert. Protestant missionaries led these ventures from 1979-1986 to find the Totobiegosode group, which led to international protest. In December 1986, a group of Ayoreo people in contact went into the forest to find uncontacted Ayoreo to evangelize, but the incident turned violent, resulting in five deaths. The Totobiegosode also attacked a group of workers in their territory in June 1998. In 2010, an expedition in search of new species of plants and insects, organized by the Natural History Museum in London, was suspended when concerns were raised that Ayoreo people might be encountered and disturbed.

== Culture ==
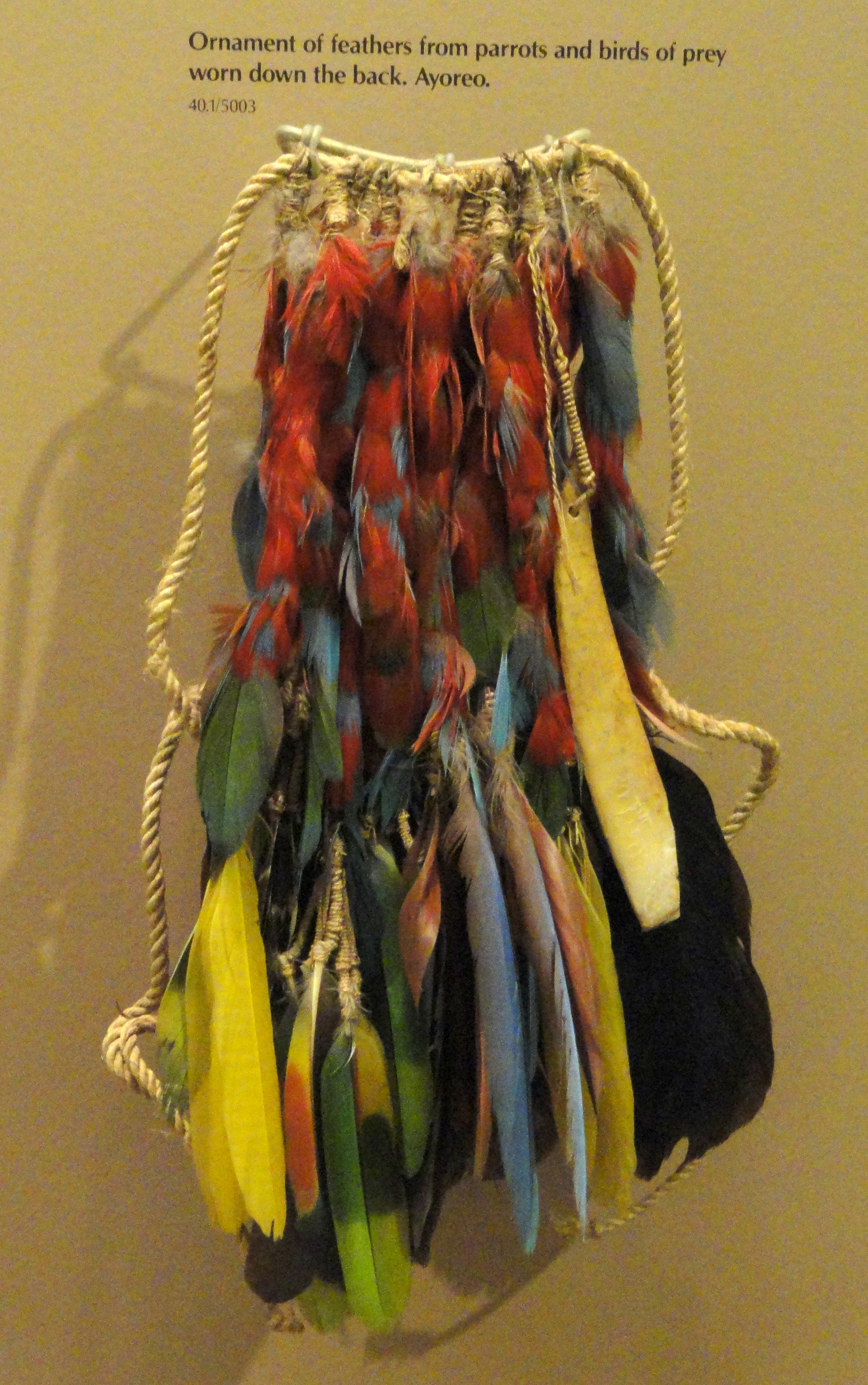
Ayoreo parrot feather ornament, AMNH

The Ayoreo are divided into seven clans, with each clan having a particular last name associated with it. The Ayoreo have a deep connection to Eami, their collective territory. They are nomadic hunter-gatherers, but in the rainy season they plant small amounts of crops, including corn, beans, and squash. They hunt anteaters, pigs, tortoises, and monkeys in the forest and collect honey from the Quebecois tree. They also have a form of shamanism. Shamans can be either gender and are known as disdain. Chiefs, called asutes, are exclusively men chosen for killing the most people or animals. Music is an integral part of Mayoress culture, and songs are passed down over time. The Ayoreo tend to be monogamous. There are records of infanticide where babies are buried alive for various reasons, such as when a baby is born to a woman who is not in an established relationship.

The Ayoreo were traditionally organized into over 50 autonomous, flexible local groups. The most widely known group is the Totobiegosode (people from the place where collared peccaries ate their gardens). Other groups include the Garaigosode (those who live in the lowlands), the Tacheigosode (the people from the region of abundant agouti), the Direquedéjnaigosode (the people who arrived the other day), and the Guidaigosode (those who live in villages); Ducodegosode (People of the Graves); Tiegosode (People of the River)

== People in contact ==
Ayoreo people in contact are struggling with poverty and discrimination, especially in the cities. There are few jobs, so people often work as day laborers in construction or gardening. Youth have few opportunities, so there is a need for scholarships in hopes that education will allow them to escape the current poverty. Members sometimes turn to begging or prostitution in order to survive. Ayoreo prostitutes are at a high risk for HIV, and they sometimes hide their condition and do not seek treatment in order to avoid discrimination from their community. The Ayoreo often live in settlements together, such as the Degüi Community in Santa Cruz. However, the settlements tend to be slums with poor conditions, such as houses made of mud and cane. Discrimination is especially prevalent in the healthcare system, where Ayoreo people have to wait for extended periods of time to be seen, which can lead them to avoid seeking treatment. In 2010, a group of Ayoreo-Atetadiegosode people in contact decided to return to their ancestral land to live a traditional lifestyle, and other groups may follow.

== Groups in voluntary isolation ==
As of 2013, there were about 100 uncontacted Ayoreo in 6 to 7 groups, including the Ayoreo-Totobiegosode. They are the only extant uncontacted tribes in South America not living in the Amazon. Three groups are in the Northern region of the Gran Chaco on the border of Bolivia and Paraguay in the areas of Médanos del Chaco National Park, Defensores del Chaco National Park, and Chovoreca. The other three to four groups are in the Southern region of the territory.

UNAP (Unión Nativa Ayoreo del Paraguay) lists six threats to Ayoreo living in voluntary isolation: cattle farming and deforestation, sale and allocation of Ayoreo territory, searches for oil, missionaries seeking contact, collection of resources from their territories (illegal under Paraguayan law), and violation of their territory by various groups. Cattle farming and the subsequent deforestation is often illegal under Paraguayan law, destroys territory and resources such as water, and increases the chance of unwanted contact. Various Paraguayan laws give the Ayoreo the right to ownership over the land they live on, which prohibits people from entering or selling the land, yet about eight million hectares is still redistributed. People with title to the land according to the law of Paraguay often claim no one lives on their land, despite evidence proving otherwise. Oil testing on Ayoreo territory reportedly disturbs the people there, risks contact, and violates the Ayoreo’s right to consultation and land ownership. By trying to evangelize the Ayoreo, missionaries risk spreading diseases and violate Paraguayan laws protecting indigenous peoples from contact. UNAP says the collection of resources takes necessities from the people living in the territory, while entry into Ayoreo land can displace the people living there, with both activities creating risk of contact.

== The Areguede’urasade ==
Seventeen Ayoreo-Totobiegosode people made contact in 2004 due to extensive deforestation in their territory. The group called themselves Areguede’urasade, meaning the band of Areguede. While they were living in the forest, they struggled to avoid contact, forced to flee from any sign of outsiders, and had to communicate by whistles to keep from being heard. They sometimes had to camp in the small patches of forest remaining around cattle pastures. Lucas Bessire recorded one story of the time before contact from a member of the Areguede’urasade describing traumatic experiences:

“We saw tracks. Cojñone [the Ayoreo term for white people], Strangers. Where? It was hot. We ran far. Faaar. Swollen tongues. We cried. Crawling low. A water tank. It was full. One Cojnoi. Fat. A red shirt. Blood in the water. Trembling underneath. We ran.”

The Areguede’urasade were contacted by another group of Totobiegosode who were sedentarized in 1986 by the New Tribes Mission. When the two tribes became one, the Areguede’urasade were forced to give up their culture, convert to Christianity, and perform servile tasks for the initial Totobiegosode group. Significant health issues were seen among members as a result of their treatment after contact.

== Political representation ==
In Bolivia, the Ayoreo people are represented by the organization CANOB (Central Ayorea Nativa del Oriente Boliviano). CANOB has its main office in Santa Cruz de la Sierra. CANOB has four titles to Native Community Lands, whose populations range from 157 to 384 people. In 2002 an Ayoreo organization was founded in Paraguay, UNAP (Unión Nativa Ayoreo del Paraguay or the Union of Ayoreo Natives of Paraguay) that has its headquarters at the frontier between the Campo Loro and Ebetogué regions. Mateo Sobode Chiquenoi and Yacamái Chiquenoi are former UNAP presidents who have written in defense of the Ayoreo in isolation and shared their personal stories. The two organizations have held joint meetings due to the transnational nature of the Ayoreo territory. The Totobiegosode are represented by their own organization, OPIT (Organización Payipie Ichadie Totobiegosode or the Payipie Ichadie Totobiegosode Organization). There is also an organization that specifically represents Ayoreo communities around the Paraguay River, Consejo de Líderes de Alto Paraguay. Various non-governmental organizations (NGOs) support Ayoreo organizations, such as APCOB, GAT (Gente, Ambiente, Territorio), which works with OPIT. UNAP and the NGO Iniciativa Amotocodie (IA) monitor Ayoreo territory to confirm the presence of groups in isolation through signs such as holes cut in trees to collect honey.

== Local groups ==
Local Ayoreo groups:

- Amomégosóde
- Atetadiegosode
- Cochóigosode
- Diequedejnaigosode (Unirequedéjnagosode)
- Ducodégosode
- Eampepaigosode
- Gatebuigosode
- Guedogosode
- Ijnapuigosode
- Jachaigosode
- Ñamacodegosode
- Pajogosode
- Tiégosode
- Totobíegosode
- Tujnoigosode
- Tunupegosode
- Uechamitógosóde

Ayoréo, Paraguay:

- Amomégosóde
- Chabotódiegosóde
- Cutérepajógosode
- Dajeguéogosóde
- Ducodégosode
- Erãpeparígosóde
- Guidaigosode
- Tiégosode
- Totobíegosode

Ayoréo, Bolivia:

- Carábiagosode
- Cochocoigosode
- Cucójnaigosode
- Direquedéjnagosipísode (Unirequedéjnagosode)
- Dorojobiégosóde
- Jachaigosode
- Jnupedógosóde
- Pajogosode
- Picádebúigosóde
- Tiequedéjnagosóde
- Tiquijnachúigosóde
- Togarógosóde
- Tuijnaigosode
- Uechamitógosóde
