= Carapá River =

Location
- Country: Paraguay

The Carapá River is a river of Paraguay.

== See also ==
- List of rivers of Paraguay
