= Mayor Pablo Lagerenza =

- Location within Paraguay
- Coordinates: 19°55′12″S 60°47′24″W
- Country: Paraguay
- Department: Alto Paraguay

Area
  - Total: 37.076 km^{2} (14.315 sq mi)
- Elevation: 182 m (597 ft)

Population (2022)
  - Total: 2,990
- Time zone: UTC-3
- Climate: BSh

Mayor Pablo Lagerenza is a town in the Alto Paraguay department of Paraguay. It was the capital of the former Chaco Department from 1973 to 1992, consisting today of the western part of Alto Paraguay.

== Sources ==
- World Gazeteer: Paraguay – World-Gazetteer.com
