= Ypané River =

Coordinates: 23°28′39″S 57°26′32″W

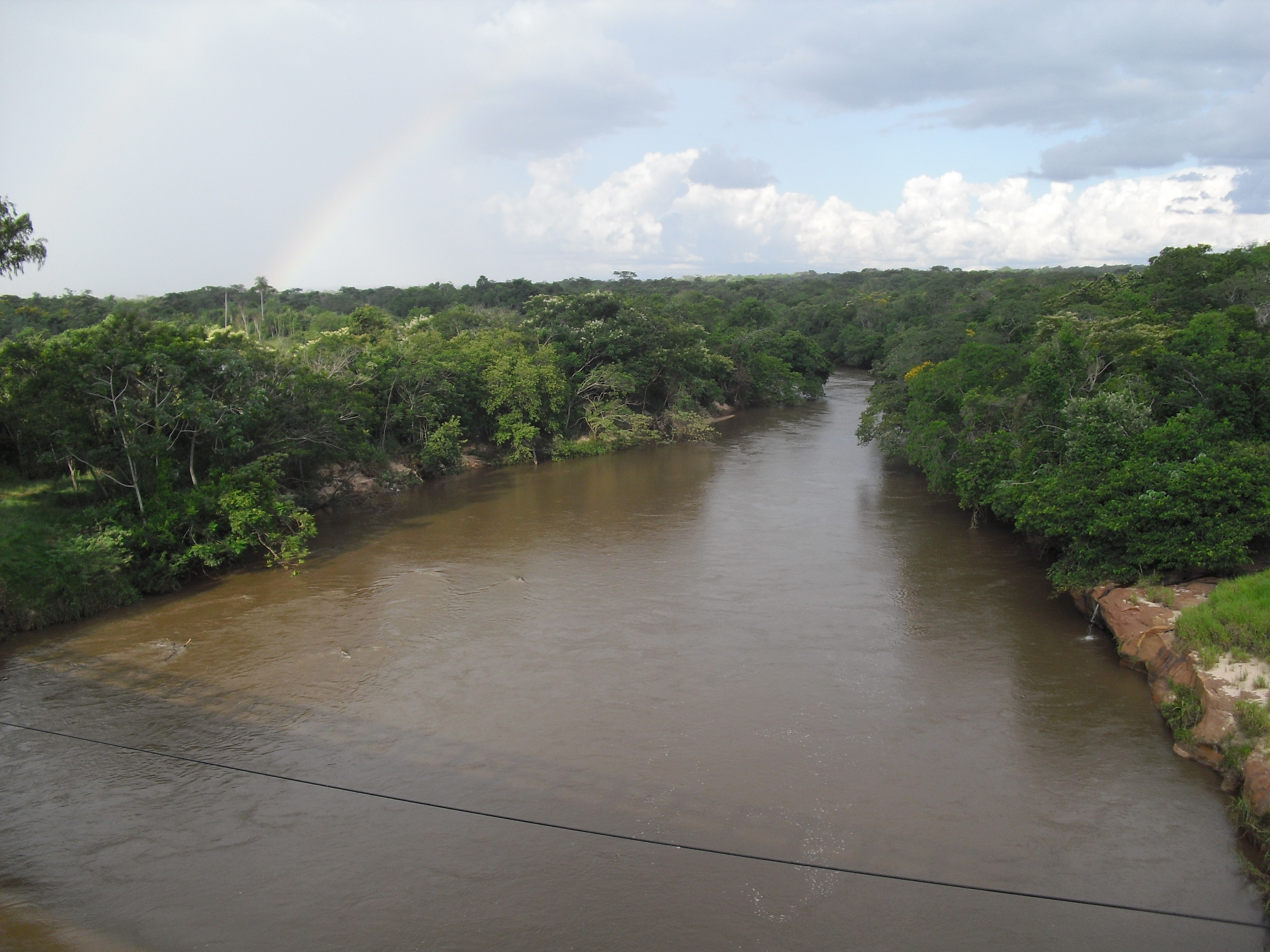

Location
- Country: Paraguay

Physical characteristics
- Mouth
  - location: Paraguay River

The Ypané River (Spanish, Río Ypané) is a river of Paraguay. It is a tributary of the Paraguay River.

== See also ==
- List of rivers of Paraguay
- Tributaries of the Río de la Plata
