= Ayoreo language =

Language spoken in Paraguay and Bolivia

Ayoreo
- Native to: Paraguay, Bolivia
- Region: Chaco, Alto Paraguay departments (Paraguay); Santa Cruz Department (Bolivia)
- Ethnicity: Ayoreo people
- Native speakers: 4,700 (2012)
- Language family: Zamucoan: Ayoreo

Official status
- Official language in: Bolivia

Language codes
- ISO 639-3: ayo
- Glottolog: ayor1240
- ELP: Ayoreo

Ayoreo is a Zamucoan language spoken in both Paraguay and Bolivia. It is also known as Morotoco, Moro, Ayoweo, Ayoré, and Pyeta Yovai. However, the name "Ayoreo" is more common in Bolivia, and "Morotoco" in Paraguay. It is spoken by the Ayoreo people, an indigenous ethnic group traditionally living on a combined hunter-gatherer and farming lifestyle.

== Classification ==
Ayoreo is classified as a Zamucoan language, along with Chamacoco.

== Geographic distribution ==
Ayoreo is spoken in both Paraguay and Bolivia, with 3,100 speakers total, 1,700 of whom live in Paraguay and 1,400 in Bolivia. Within Paraguay, Ayoreo is spoken in the Chaco Department and the northern parts of the Alto Paraguay Department. In Bolivia, it is spoken in the Cordillera Province, in the Santa Cruz Department.

== Phonology ==
Bertinetto (2009) reports that Ayoreo has the 5 vowels /a, e, i, o, u/, which appear both as oral and nasal.

Consonants
		Bilabial	Alveolar	Palatal	Velar	Glottal
Plosive	voiceless	p	t		k	ʔ
Plosive	prenasal	ᵐb	ⁿd		ᵑɡ	
Affricate				t͡ʃ		
Fricative			s			h
Nasal	voiceless	m̥	n̥	ɲ̥		
Nasal	voiced	m	n	ɲ	ŋ	
Approximant			ɹ	j	w	

/j/ can also be heard as [dʒ].

== Grammar ==
The prototypical constituent order is subject-verb-object, as seen in the following examples:

Sérgio ch-ingo caratai aroi tome Ramon.
Sérgio 3-show jaguar skin to Ramon
‘Sérgio showed the jaguar’s skin to Ramon’.

Enga ore ch-ijnoque Víctor aja señóra Emília i-guijnai.
COORD 3P 3-carry Víctor towards señora Emília house
‘And they carried Víctor to Señora Emília’s house’.

Ayoreo is a fusional language.

Verbs agree with their subjects, but there is no tense-inflection. Consider the following paradigm, which has prefixes marking person and suffixes marking number:

y-aca	I plant
b-aca	you plant
ch-aca	he, she, they plant
y-aca-go	we plant
uac-aca-y	you (pl) plant

When the verb root contains a nasal, there are nasalized variants of the agreement affixes:

ñ-ojne	I spread
m-ojne	you spread
ch-ojne	he, she, they spread
ñ-ojne-ngo	we spread
uac-ojne-ño	you (pl) spread

Ayoreo is a mood-prominent language. Nouns can be divided into possessable and non-possessable; possessor agreement is expressed through a prefixation. The syntax of Ayoreo is characterized by the presence of para-hypotactical structures.
