= Yguazú River =

Coordinates: 24.3553°S 54.9356°W

Location
- Country: Paraguay

The Yguazú River is a river of Paraguay.

== See also ==
- List of rivers of Paraguay
