= St. Lawrence Cathedral, San Lorenzo =

Coordinates: 25.3419°S 57.5083°W

Cathedral of St. Lawrence
- Catedral de San Lorenzo
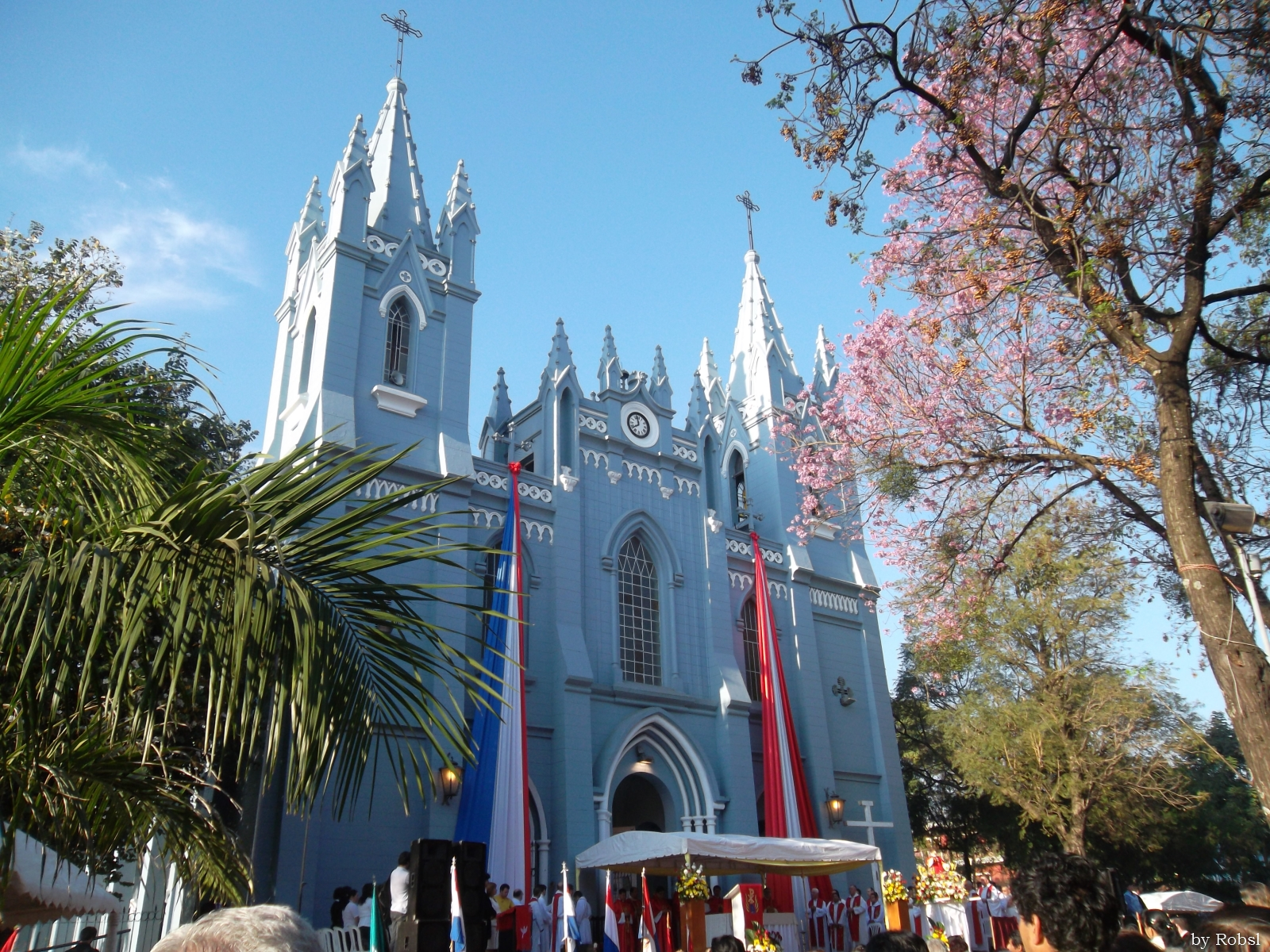
- Cathedral of St. Lawrence
- Location: San Lorenzo
- Country: Paraguay
- Denomination: Roman Catholic Church
- Sui iuris church: Latin Church

History
- Status: Cathedral

Architecture
- Functional status: Active

Administration
- Diocese: Diocese of San Lorenzo

The Cathedral of St. Lawrence (Spanish: Catedral de San Lorenzo) is a cathedral of the Roman Catholic Church in the city of San Lorenzo, Paraguay dating from the early twentieth century, although its completion took circa 50 years. It is the seat of the Catholic diocese of San Lorenzo (Dioecesis Sancti Laurentii), which Pope John Paul II instituted by the Papal bull Magno perfundimur of 2000.

It is located in the city center, surrounded by squares, plazas, and pedestrian streets. The cathedral and squares occupy an entire city block bordered by the streets Gaspar Rodriguez de Francia, San Lorenzo, Coronel Romero, and the Defensores del Chaco avenue. Its style is unique in the Republic of Paraguay.

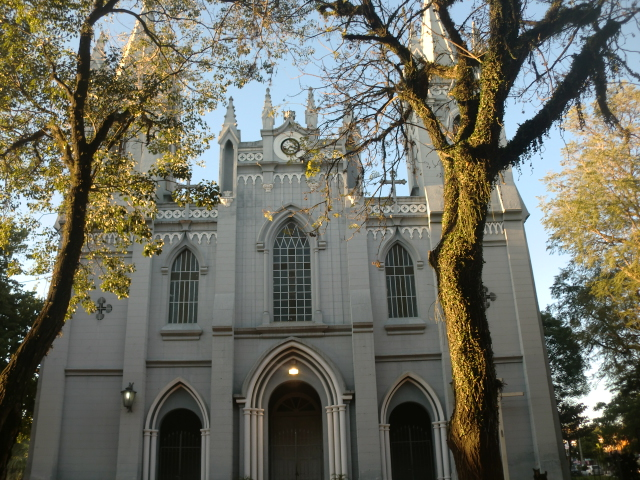
Another view of the Cathedral

== See also ==
- Roman Catholicism in Paraguay
