= Confuso River =

Coordinates: 25°7′57″S 57°32′31″W

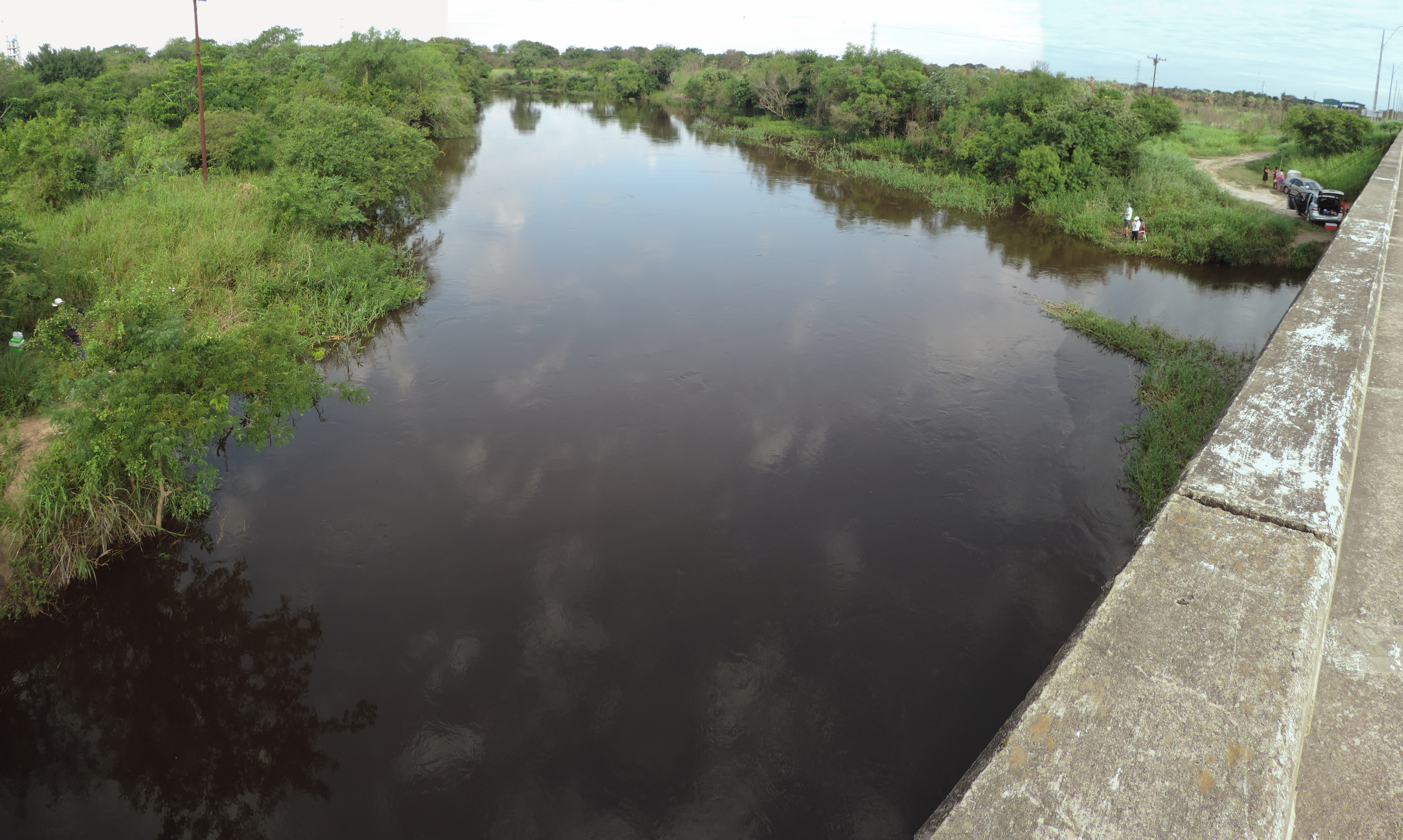

Location
- Country: Paraguay

Physical characteristics
- Mouth
  - location: Paraguay River

The Confuso River (Spanish, Río Confuso) is a river of Paraguay. It is a tributary of the Paraguay River.

== See also ==
- List of rivers of Paraguay
