= Jejuy River =

Location
- Country: Paraguay

Physical characteristics
- Source
  - location: Northeastern Paraguay
- Mouth
  - location: Paraguay River
  - coordinates: 24°10′41″S 57°14′39″W

The Jejuy River (Spanish: Río Jejuy), a tributary of Paraguay River, is a river in Paraguay. Located in the San Pedro Department, it flows eastwards discharging to Paraguay River north of Asunción. Aracaré was said to be from the Jejuy River.

== See also ==
- List of rivers of Paraguay
