= Río Verde (Paraguay) =

River in Paraguay

Verde River
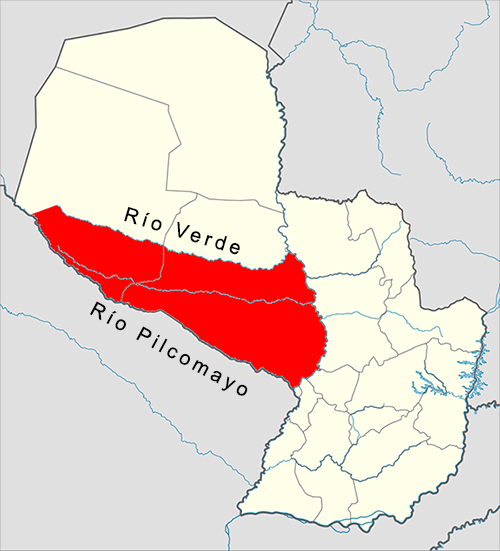
- Location of Río Verde
- Native name: Río Verde

Location
- Country: Paraguay
- Department: Boquerón; Presidente Hayes

Physical characteristics
- Source: Chaco Boreal
- Mouth: Paraguay River
- Length: 255 km (158 mi)

Río Verde (English: Verde River, lit. 'green river') is a Paraguayan river. It flows through the Chaco region, crossing the departments of Boquerón and Presidente Hayes, and empties into the middle course of the Paraguay River, of which it is a right-bank tributary.

It has a length of 255 km (158 mi) and a drainage area of more than 24,000 km^{2} (9,300 sq mi).

It presents numerous meanders and levees with wetlands along its course, which hinder drainage and cause flooding. Hydraulic works had to be carried out to address this issue. It carries mostly saltwater, and its small flow increases during the rainy season.

== Argentina–Paraguay boundary ==
After the end of the Paraguayan War, Argentina and Paraguay disputed a sector of the Chaco Boreal north of the Pilcomayo River. The Machaín-Irigoyen Treaty was signed on February 3, 1876, dividing the disputed territory in two. Paraguayan sovereignty was recognized between the Verde River and Bahía Negra, while the area between the Pilcomayo and Verde rivers was submitted to international arbitration. United States President Rutherford B. Hayes carried out this arbitration and ruled in Paraguay's favor on November 12, 1878. Argentina handed over the town of Villa Occidental on May 14, 1879. This defined the Argentina–Paraguay border as the Pilcomayo River rather than the Verde River.

== See also ==
- List of rivers of Paraguay
