= Melo River =

Location
- Country: Paraguay

The Melo River is a river of Paraguay.

== See also ==
- List of rivers of Paraguay
