= Monte Lindo River =

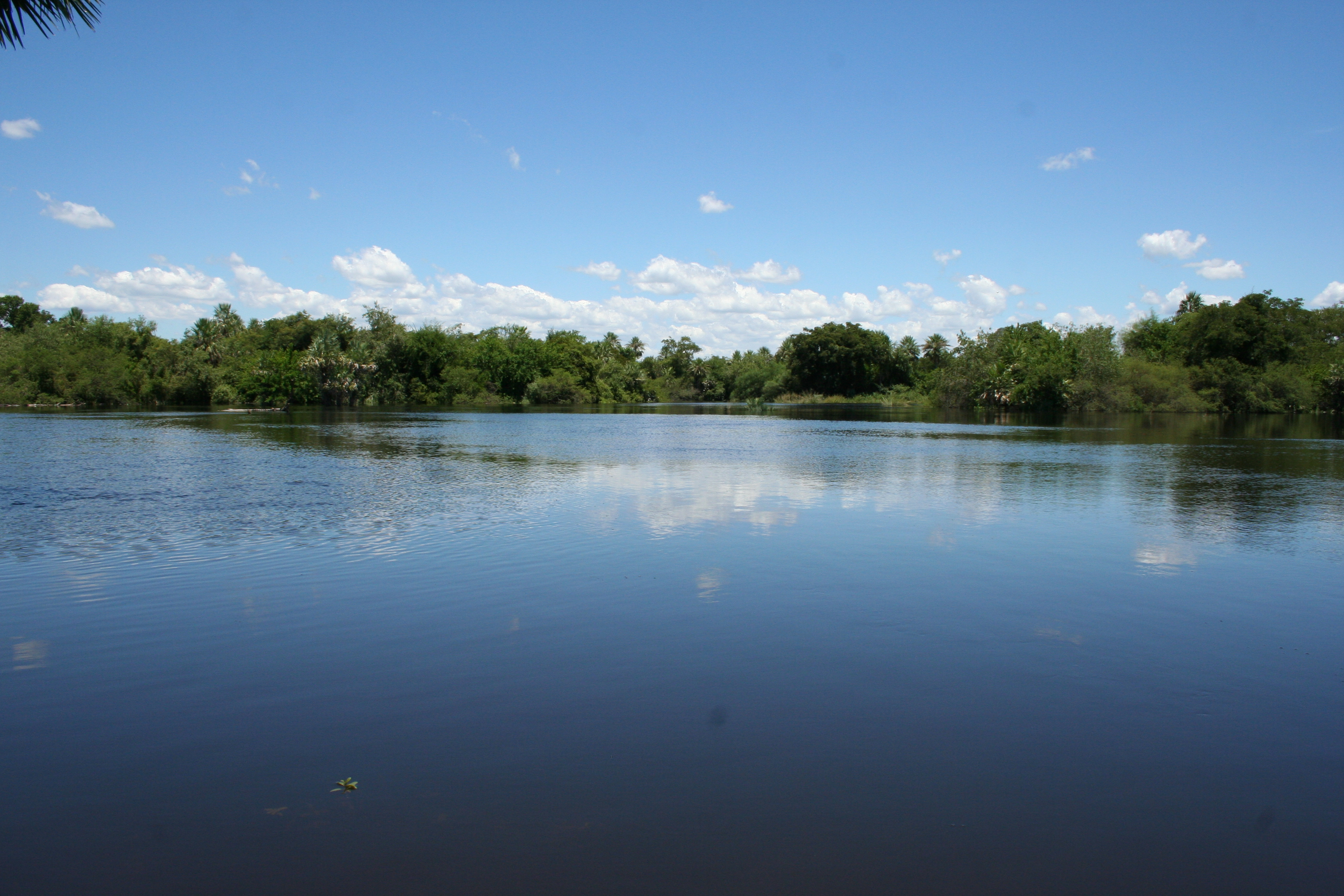

Location
- Country: Paraguay

Physical characteristics
- Mouth: Paraguay River
  - coordinates: 23°54′15″S 57°18′29″W

The Monte Lindo River is a river of Paraguay.

== See also ==
- List of rivers of Paraguay
