= Cathedral of the Incarnation, Encarnación =

Cathedral of the Incarnation
- Catedral de la Encarnación
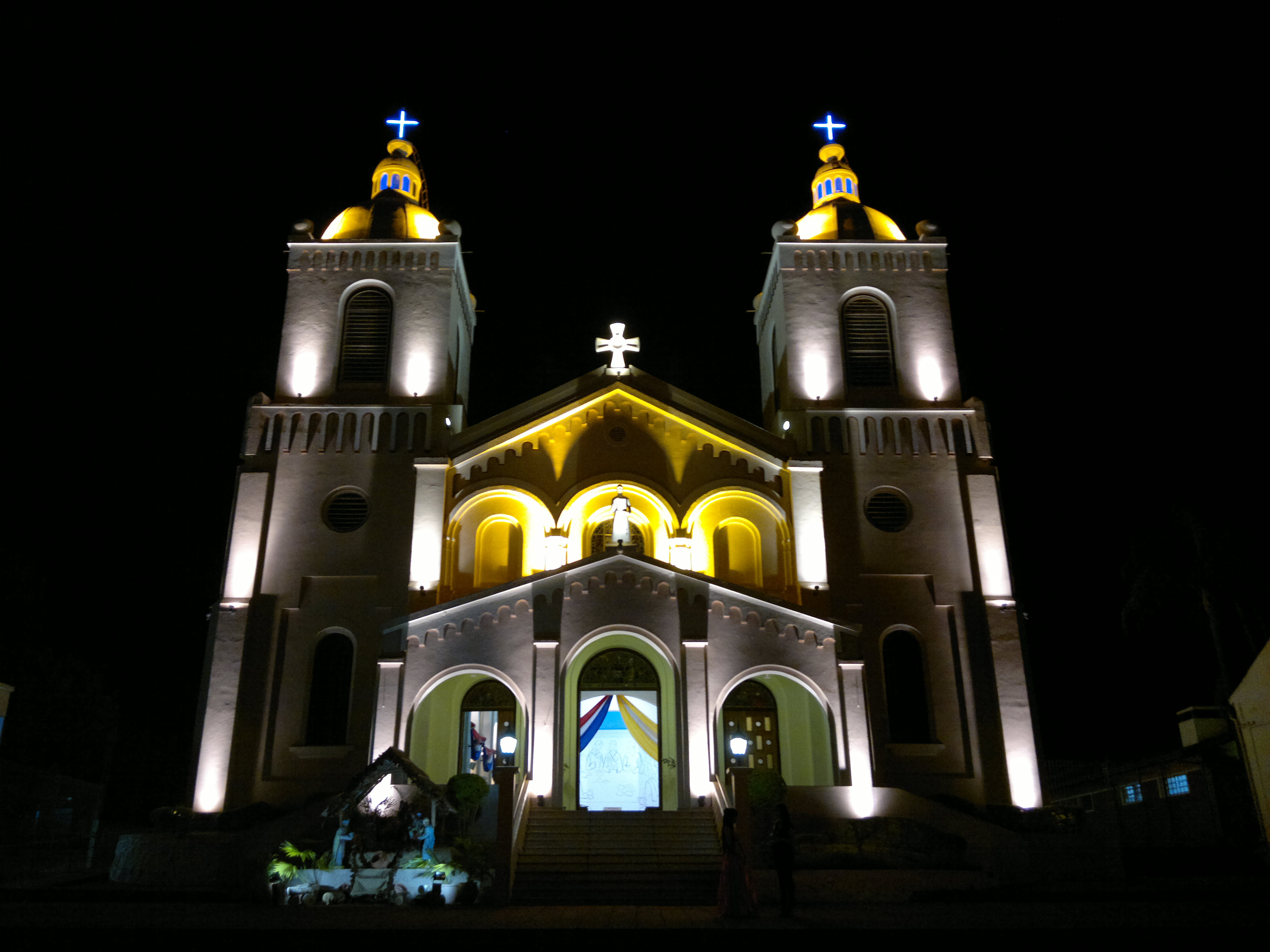
- Cathedral of the Incarnation
- 27.3390°S 55.8689°W
- Location: Encarnación
- Country: Paraguay
- Denomination: Roman Catholic Church

The Cathedral of the Incarnation (Spanish: Catedral de la Encarnación) Also Encarnación Cathedral Is the name that receives a religious building affiliated to the Catholic Church that is located in the center of the city of Encarnación that is the capital of the Department of Itapúa in the southern end of the South American country of Paraguay.

The current structure dates back to the efforts that began in 1913 and continued between 1928 and 1938 when it was opened. It remounts its history to other churches like the one of 1718 in the present Plaza de Armas and another one of 1848 in the same place. For the celebrations of the Bicentennial one did works of improvement of the enlightenment.

The temple follows the Roman or Latin rite and is the seat of the Diocese of Encarnación (Dioecesis Sanctissimae Incarnationis) which was created as a territorial prelature in 1957 and was promoted to its current status through the bull "Crevisse iam" of the then Pope John Paul II.

It is under the pastoral responsibility of Bishop Francisco Javier Pistilli Scorzara.

== See also ==
- Roman Catholicism in Paraguay
- Cathedral of the Incarnation (Nashville, Tennessee)

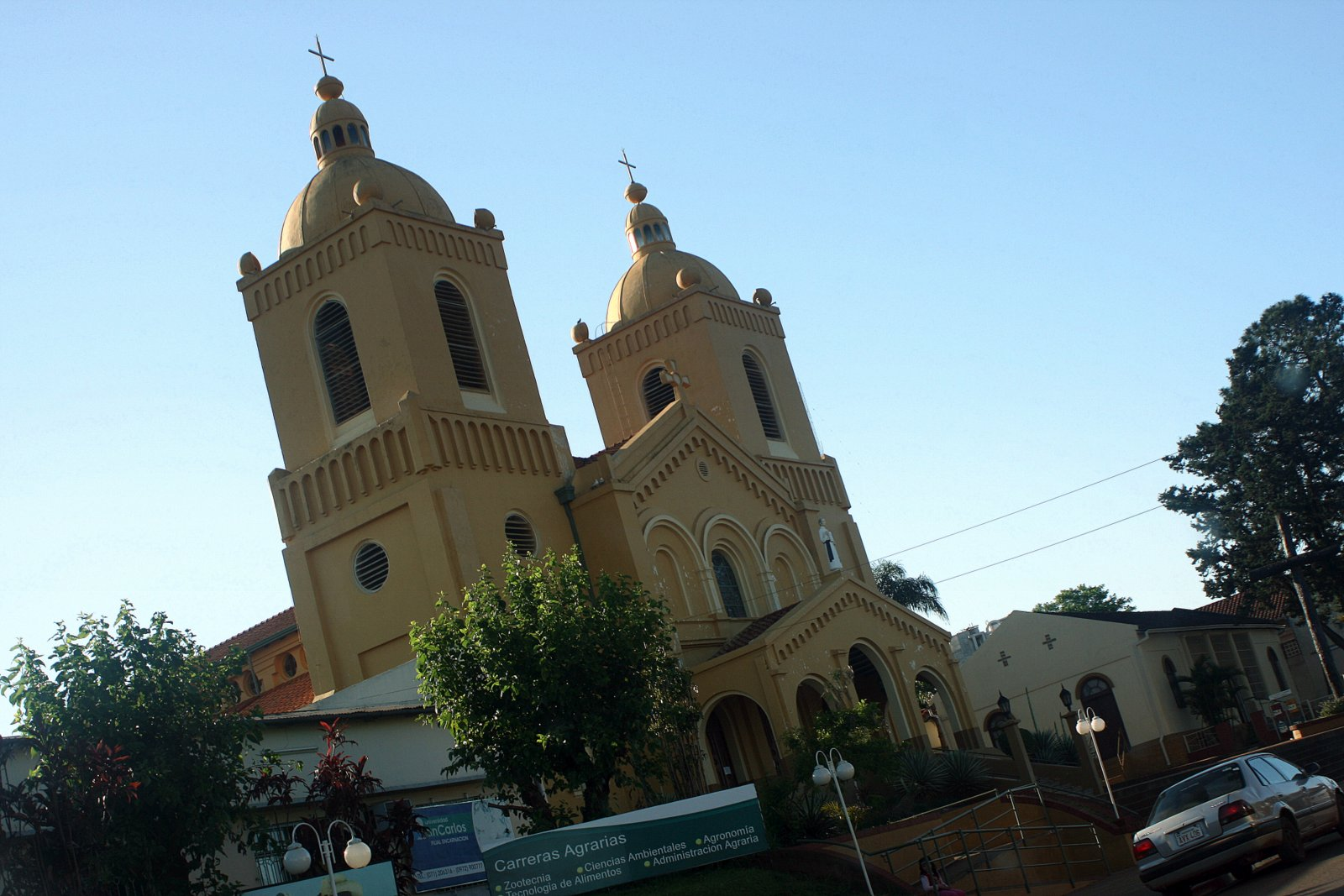
Another view
