= Aguaray-Guazú River (Jejuí Guazú River tributary) =

Aguaray-Guazú River (Jejuí Guazú River)

Location
- Country: Paraguay

The Aguaray-Guazú River is a river of Paraguay. It is a tributary of the Jejuí Guazú River.

== See also ==
- List of rivers of Paraguay
