= Negro River (Paraguay) =

Coordinates: 24°23′49.9″S 57°11′49.2″W

- Native name: Rio Negro (Spanish)

Location
- Country: Paraguay

The Negro River (Paraguay) is a river of Paraguay.

== See also ==
- List of rivers of Paraguay
