= Zamucoan languages =

Language family of Paraguay and Bolivia

Zamucoan
- Samúkoan
- Geographic distribution: Paraguay and Bolivia
- Linguistic classification: One of the world's primary language families
- Subdivisions: Ayoreo; Chamacoco; Zamuco †; Guarañoca † (possibly a dialect of Ayoreo)

Language codes
- Glottolog: zamu1243

Zamucoan (also Samúkoan) is a small language family of Paraguay (northeast Chaco) and Bolivia (Santa Cruz Department).

The family has hardly been studied by linguists (as of Adelaar & Muysken 2004), although several studies have recently appeared (see: Bertinetto 2009, 2010, 2013; Ciucci 2007/08, 2009, 2010a, 2010b, 2013a, 2013b). Recent studies show that the Zamucoan languages are characterized by a rare syntactic configuration which is called para-hypotaxis, in which coordination and subordination are used simultaneously to connect clauses (Bertinetto & Ciucci 2012).

== Classification ==
=== Extant languages ===
Zamucoan consists of two living languages:

- Ayoreo (also known as Zamuco, Ayoré, Moro, Ayoréo, Ayoweo, Samuko, Morotoco, Pyeta, Yovai) – 3,160 speakers
- Chamacoco (also known as Bahía Negra, Ebidoso, Tumarahá, Chamakoko, Ebitoso, Ishiro, Jeywo) – 2,000 speakers

=== Genetic relations ===
From the historical record of the Zamucoan peoples, the living Zamucoan languages appear to have had several relatives, now extinct. It is not clear if these were necessarily distinct languages, or even that they were Zamucoan, but Mason (1950) listed them as follows:

- Zamucoan
  - Northern
    - Zamuco (Ayoreo): Zamuco (Samuca); Satienyo (Zatieño, Ibiraya)
    - Morotoco (Coroino)
      - Cucarate (Kukutade)
      - Orebate (Ororebate); Carerá
      - Panono (Panana)
      - Tomoeno
    - Guarañoca [possibly a dialect of Ayoreo]: Tsiracua (Empelota); Mora (remnants of Morotoco and Guarañoca)
    - Ugaraño
    - Tapii (Tapio)
    - Poturero (Ninaquiguilá)
  - Southern
    - Chamacoco (Tumanahá, Timinihá): Ebidoso, Horio (Ishira), Tumerehã
    - Imono
    - Tunacho (Tunaca)
    - Caipotorade

== Bibliography ==
- Adelaar, Willem F. H.; & Muysken, Pieter C. (2004). The languages of the Andes. Cambridge language surveys. Cambridge University Press.
- Bertinetto, Pier Marco (2009). Ayoreo (Zamuco). A grammatical sketch. Quaderni del laboratorio di Linguistica 8 n.s. (Online version: <http://linguistica.sns.it/QLL/QLL09.htm>).
- Bertinetto, Pier Marco (2010). How the Zamuco languages dealt with verb affixes. Quaderni del Laboratorio di Linguistica 9,1 n.s. (Online version: <http://linguistica.sns.it/QLL/QLL10.htm>).
- Bertinetto, Pier Marco (2013). Ayoreo (Zamuco) as a radical tenseless language. Quaderni del Laboratorio di Linguistica 12 n.s. (Online version: <http://linguistica.sns.it/QLL/QLL13.htm>)
- Bertinetto, Pier Marco & Luca Ciucci 2012. Parataxis, Hypotaxis and Para-Hypotaxis in the Zamucoan Languages. In: Linguistic Discovery 10.1: 89-111.
- Campbell, Lyle. (1997). American Indian languages: The historical linguistics of Native America. New York: Oxford University Press. ISBN 0-19-509427-1.
- Ciucci, Luca (2007/08). Indagini sulla morfologia verbale nella lingua ayoreo. Quaderni del Laboratorio di Linguistica della Scuola Normale Superiore 7 n.s. (Online version: <http://linguistica.sns.it/QLL/QLL07_08.htm>)
- Ciucci, Luca (2009). Elementi di morfologia verbale del chamacoco. Quaderni del Laboratorio di Linguistica della Scuola Normale Superiore 8 n.s. (Online version: <http://linguistica.sns.it/QLL/QLL09.htm>)
- Ciucci, Luca (2010a). La flessione possessiva dell’ayoreo. Quaderni del Laboratorio di Linguistica della Scuola Normale Superiore 9,2 n.s. (Online version: <http://linguistica.sns.it/QLL/QLL10.htm>)
- Ciucci, Luca (2010b). La flessione possessiva del chamacoco. Quaderni del Laboratorio di Linguistica della Scuola Normale Superiore 9,2 n.s. (Online version: <http://linguistica.sns.it/QLL/QLL10.htm>)
- Ciucci, Luca (2013a). Inflectional morphology in the Zamucoan languages. Pisa: Scuola Normale Superiore di Pisa. Ph.D. Thesis.
- Ciucci, Luca (2013b). Chamacoco lexicographical supplement. Quaderni del Laboratorio di Linguistica della Scuola Normale Superiore 12 n.s. (Online version: <http://linguistica.sns.it/QLL/QLL13.htm>)
- Fabre, Alain. (por aparecer, 2005). Los pueblos del Gran Chaco y sus lenguas, cuarta parte: Los zamuco. Suplemento Antropológico, Asunción.
- Kaufman, Terrence. (1990). Language history in South America: What we know and how to know more. In D. L. Payne (Ed.), Amazonian linguistics: Studies in lowland South American languages (pp. 13–67). Austin: University of Texas Press. ISBN 0-292-70414-3.
- Kaufman, Terrence. (1994). The native languages of South America. In C. Mosley & R. E. Asher (Eds.), Atlas of the world's languages (pp. 46–76). London: Routledge.
- Ulrich, M.; Ulrich, R. (2000). Diccionario Ishi̵ro (Chamacoco) - Español, Español - Ishi̵ro (Chamacoco). Asuncion: Misión a Nuevas Tribus Paraguay.
