= Aguaray-Guazú River (Paraguay River tributary) =

River in Paraguay

Coordinates: 26.169895°S 54.24589°W

Aguaray-Guazú River (Paraguay River)

Location
- Country: Paraguay

The Aguaray-Guazú River is a river of Paraguay. It is a tributary of the Paraguay River.
