= Fuerte Olimpo =

- City
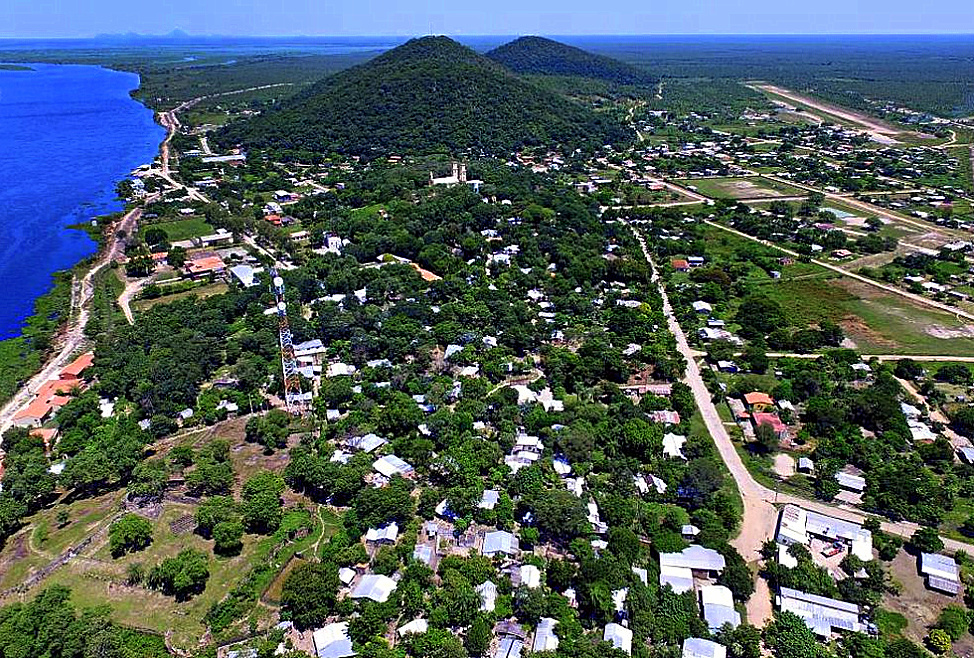
- Aerial view of the city

- Location within Paraguay
- Coordinates: 21°2′15″S 57°52′15″W
- Country: Paraguay
- Department: Alto Paraguay
- Founded: September 25, 1792

Government
  - Intendente municipal: Diego Ricardo Gallagher Villamayor
- Elevation: 64 m (210 ft)

Population
  - Total: 4,498
- Time zone: -3 Gmt
- Postal code: 9000
- Climate: Aw

Fuerte Olimpo (Spanish pronunciation: [ˈfweɾte oˈlimpo]) is a city in Paraguay. It is the capital of the department of Alto Paraguay. Straddling the river Paraguay which forms the border with Brazil, Fuerte Olimpo is Paraguay's northernmost departmental capital, located over 830 km (515 mi) north of the capital Asunción. It was originally called Fuerte Borbón. The city is also known as “la puerta de entrada al Pantanal”, or entrance to the Pantanal region.

Fuerte Olimpo is on east of Chaco Boreal on east shore of Paraguay River near the mouth of Blanco River, to the north the moist ground called humedales from the Gran Pantanal. Fuerte Olimpo is far away from the flood area. The city is surrounded by a wall 4 km long.

== Geography ==
This plain is almost 300 metres above the sea level. The soil is good for farming and cattle raising. Laguna Capitán is a lagoon in Fuerte Olimpo. Fuerte Olimpo is between two hills, in one is Fuerte Bordón and in the other one is Maria Auxiliadora Cathedral. The hill 3 hermanos are elevations of the region, on top of the middle cerro palms of karanday can be seen and also the moist ground of the Pantanal Nabileque and Sierra de Bordón in Brazil.

=== Weather ===
The weather is tropical, temperature is around 45 °C (113 °F) in summer, and the minimum 9 °C (48 °F) in winter. The average is 25 °C (77 °F). Long droughts followed by strong rains are important characteristics of the region.

== Demography ==
Fuerte Olimpo is a city with 4998 inhabitants, 2585 men and 2413 women, according to the Census.

== History ==
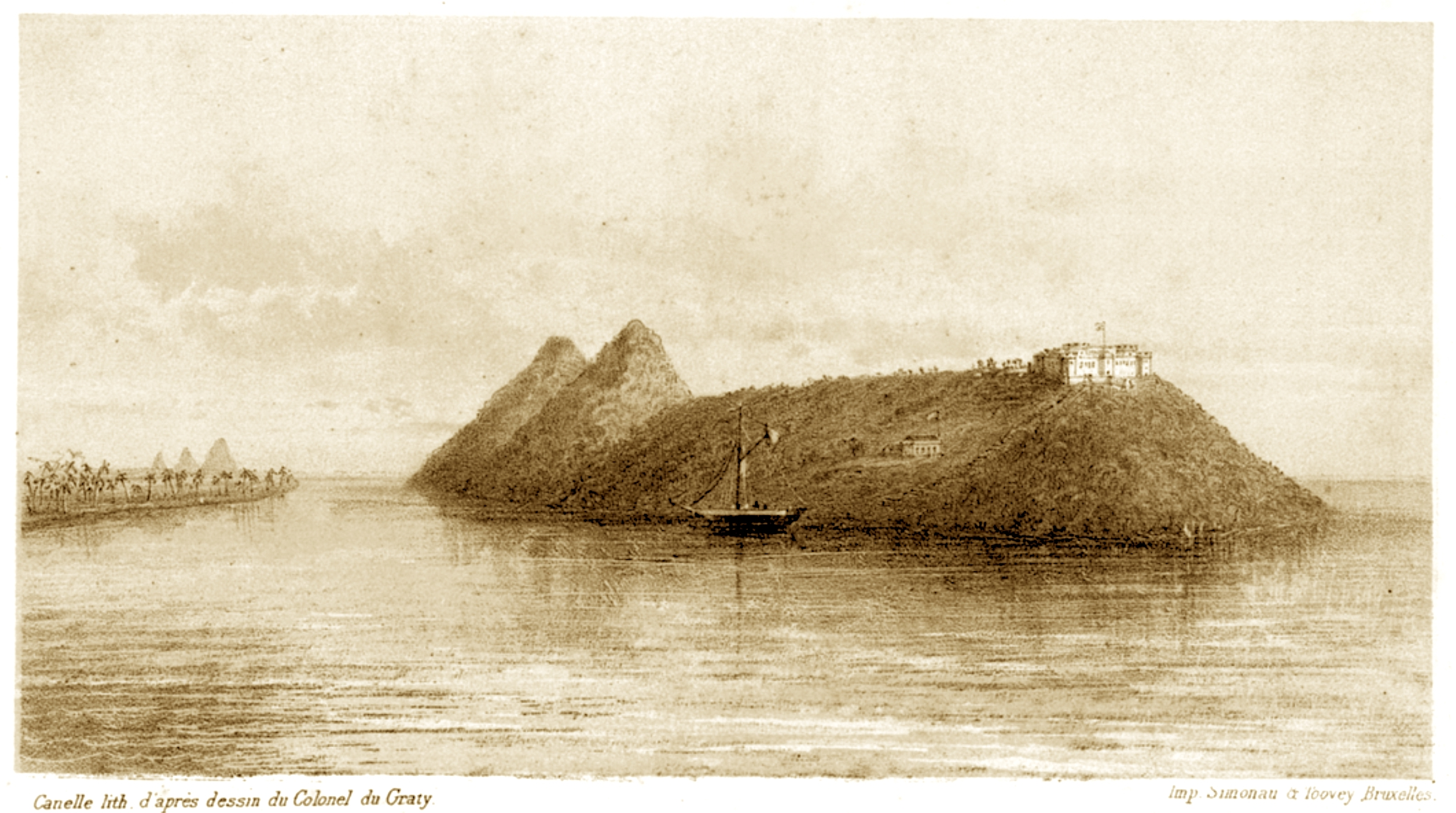
Fuerte Olimpo in 1862, Paraguay's northern strongpoint in the Chaco opposite Brazilian territory.

The city was founded by Spain in 1792 named Fuerte Borbón by the Governor Joaquín Alos y Bru, who sent the Commandant José Antonio de Zavala y Delgadillo, to protect the area from the Virreinato del Río de la Plata from the bandeirantes from Brazil. The first settlement was between the Brazilian Forte Porto Carrero and Fecho dos Morros. Caciques Mbayaes were invited for the foundation.

During José Gaspar Rodríguez de Francia government it was called Fuerte Olimpo, maybe because of the main Cerro (hill) which was said to resemble Mount Olimpus in ancient Greece. At that time Paraguayan sovereignty established a free port for Brazilian trading.

At the beginning of Paraguayan War (1865–1870) it was a very important offensive spot in the Mato Grosso, in 1866 Fuerte Olimpo was a strategic place too but it was taken by Brazilians when the campaign ended. Originally, Argentina wanted to own from Fuerte Olimpo to Chaco Boreal to the Bahía Negra, but when Brazil left Paraguay, Argentina did not claim it.

After the 1870s the area belonged to large landowners who chopped the quebrechales having native people work as slaves, that period was called tannin cycle, it was the beginning of some industries, forests were destroyed and the place was used for cattle raising good for the kind of weather. Another important aspect was the industries of tiles, palm and bricks. So Fuerte Olimpo became a port for exportation. During the Chaco war in the 1930s Fuerte Olimpo was again an important place for offensive strategies.

== Economy ==
It includes some ports: 14 de Mayo, Esperanza, Leda, Lida, and Maria Elena.

The main activity is cattle raising.

== Transportation ==
Boats and canoes are the main important means of transportation to get to Fuerte Olimpo. People travel in the riverboat Aquidabán, which goes from Concepción to Bahía Negra. Another way to go there is going Route 9 “The Transchaco highway” to “Cruce Pioneros”, at km. 409, there is no paved route to get to Fuerte Olimpo. You can also get to Loma Plata, at km 444 and there is no paved route until km. 333. There is also a landing runway for small planes.

== Tourism ==
- Fuerte Borbón, from 1792. Built from rocks on one of the Olimpo hills.
- María Auxiliadora Cathedral, on top of the other hill, built of stone.
- An observatory: the three hills of Fuerte Olimpo: called "Tres Hermanos".
- A museum and a native tribe called Ishir “Virgen Santísima”, which includes presentation of some crafts and a welcome from the Shaman.
- Motor launches on the Paraguay River with a tour guide.

== Sister cities ==
- Camisano Vicentino (2011)

== See also ==
- Mary Help of Christians Cathedral, Fuerte Olimpo

== Bibliography ==
- Geografía Ilustrada del Paraguay, Distribuidora Arami SRL; 2007. ISBN 99925-68-04-6
- Geografía del Paraguay, Primera Edición 1999, Editorial Hispana Paraguay SRL
