= Catholic Church in Paraguay =

The Catholic Church in Paraguay is part of the worldwide Catholic Church, under the spiritual leadership of the Pope in Rome.

In 2018, there were around 5.7 million Catholics in Paraguay - approximately 88.3% of the total population. The country is divided into twelve dioceses including one archdiocese, the Archdiocese of Asunción. Its mother church is the Cathedral of Our Lady of the Assumption in Asunción.

In 2023, there were 900 priests and over 1,000 nuns serving 422 parishes.

The evangelization of Paraguay began in 1542. The first diocese was erected in 1547, though not occupied until 1556. In 1609, the Jesuits came and devised the "reductions" system of evangelization, organizing indigenous peoples into communities where they learned agriculture, husbandry, and trades. The Spanish government was suspicious of these communities, fearing a threat to the colonial system, but they continued until 1767 when the Jesuits were expelled from Latin America. After independence in 1811, the government still tried to control the Church by nominating its leadership.

== See also ==
- List of Catholic dioceses in Paraguay
- List of cathedrals in Paraguay
