= Alto Paraguay Department =

Department of Paraguay

Alto Paraguay Departamento de Alto Paraguay (Spanish) Yvate Paraguái Tetãvore (Guarani)
- Department
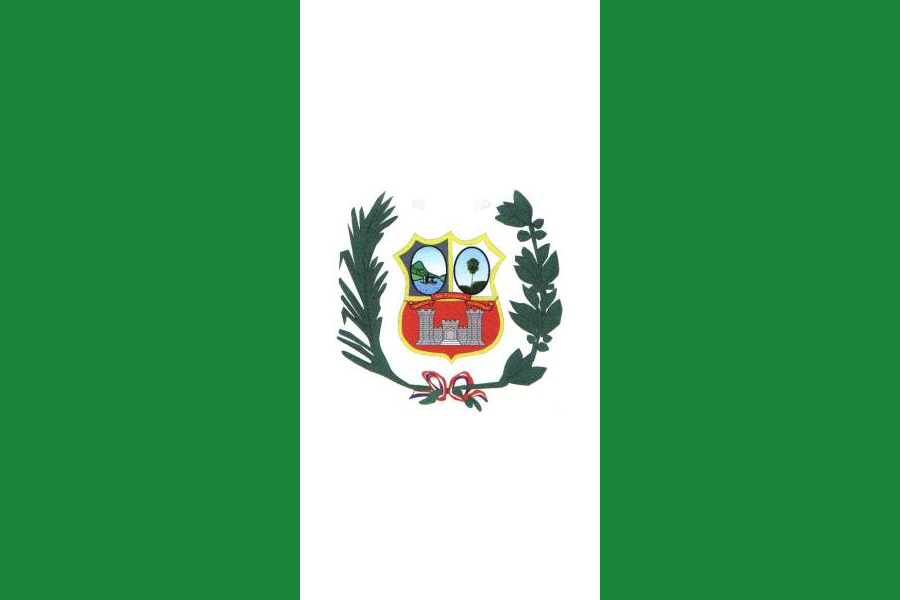
- Flag

- Coordinates: 20°30′S 59°0′W
- Country: Paraguay
- Capital: Fuerte Olimpo

Government
  - Governor: Arturo Méndez (ANR)

Area
  - Total: 82,349 km^{2} (31,795 sq mi)

Population (2022 census)
  - Total: 17,195
  - Density: 0.20881/km^{2} (0.54081/sq mi)
- Time zone: UTC-03 (PYT)
- ISO 3166 code: PY-16
- Number of Districts: 4

Alto Paraguay (Spanish pronunciation: [ˈalto paɾaˈɣwaj]; Upper Paraguay) is the least populous department of Paraguay. The capital is the town of Fuerte Olimpo.

In 1992, the Chaco Department was merged with Alto Paraguay.

== Nature and national parks ==
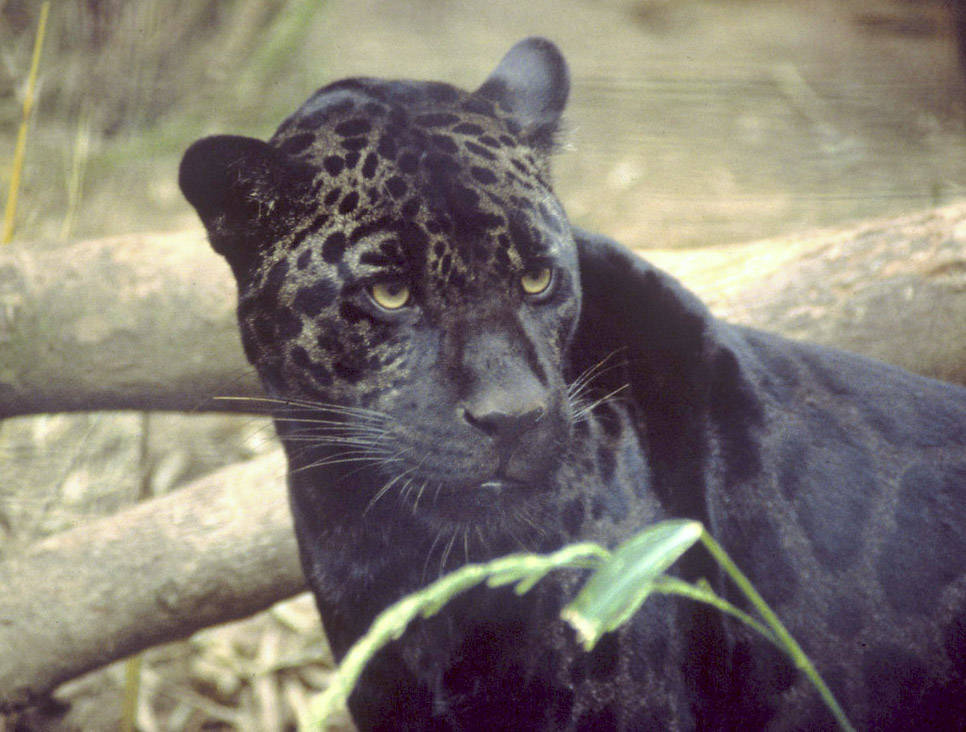
The Jaguar inhabits all of Alto Paraguay's national parks

Alto Paraguay contains many natural resources, so is home to several national parks, each with different characteristics. The Defensores del Chaco National Park is the largest in the Paraguayan territory and holds the hill Cerro León, the highest point in northern Paraguay. The dry terrain optimally grows various species of cactus. Parque Nacional Río Negro is an area with several small lakes and most of the department's fauna. In the dry regions are Parque Nacional Coronel Cabrera and Parque Nacional Chovoreca.

== Agriculture, livestock and deforestation ==
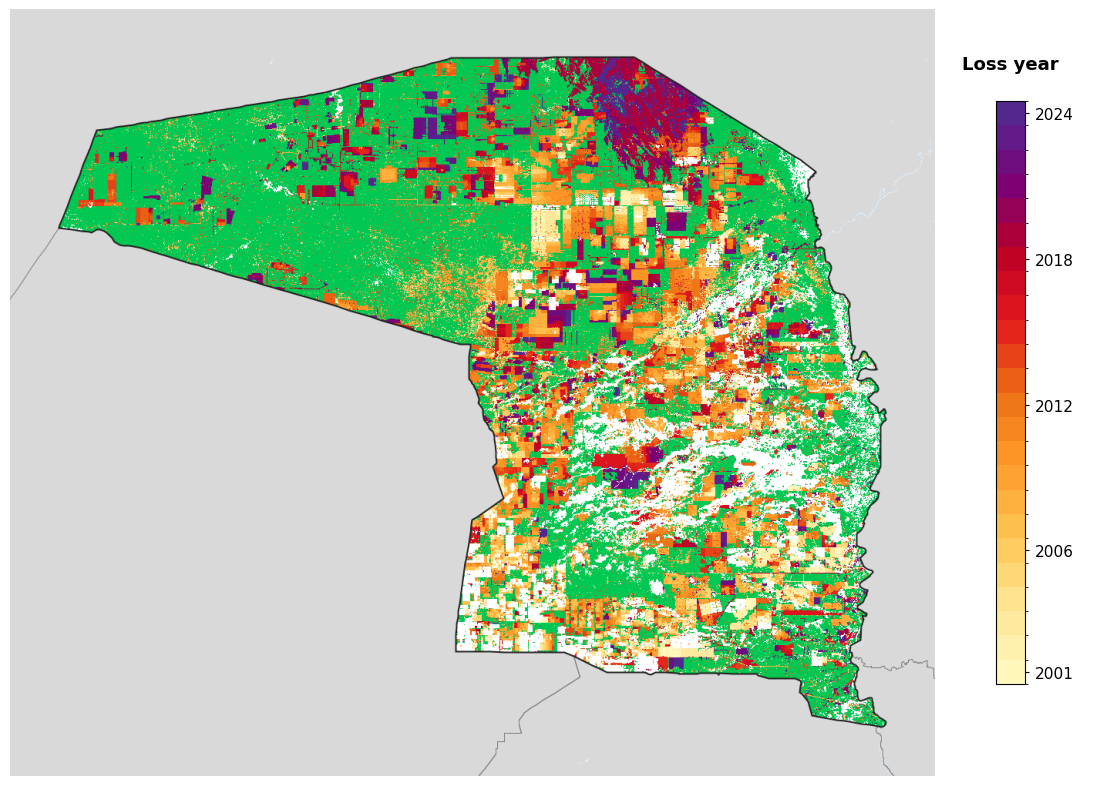
Tree-cover loss year in Alto Paraguay, 2001-2024, from the Global Forest Change dataset.

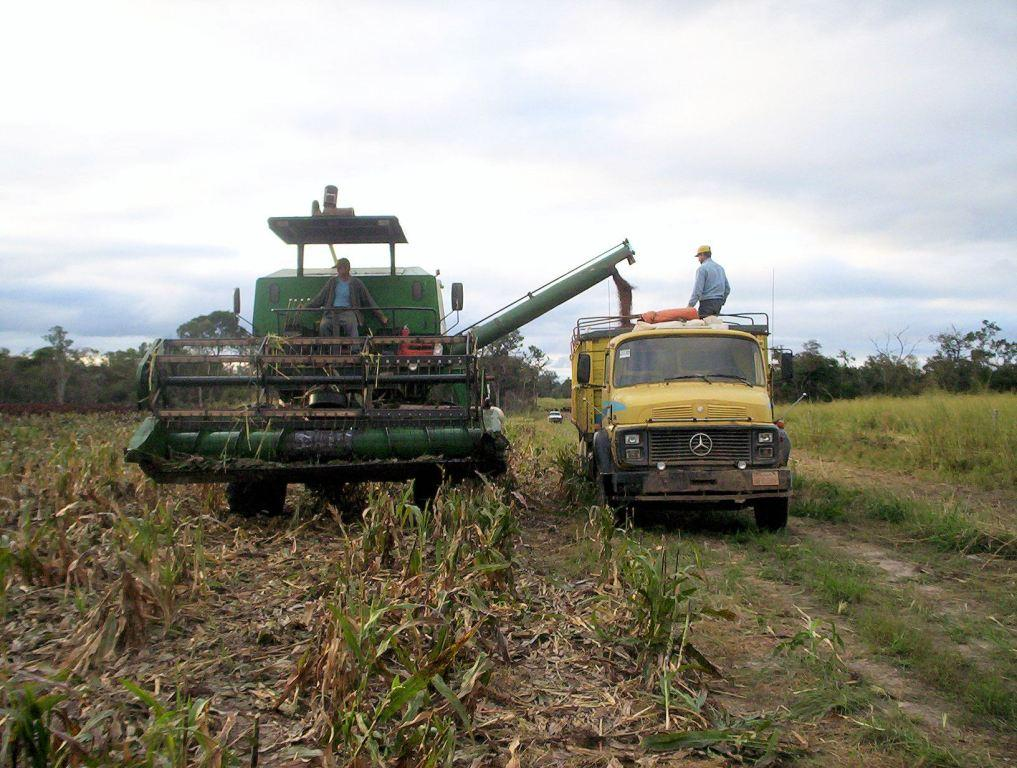
Sorghum harvest 2008, Linea 14, Agua Dulce Region

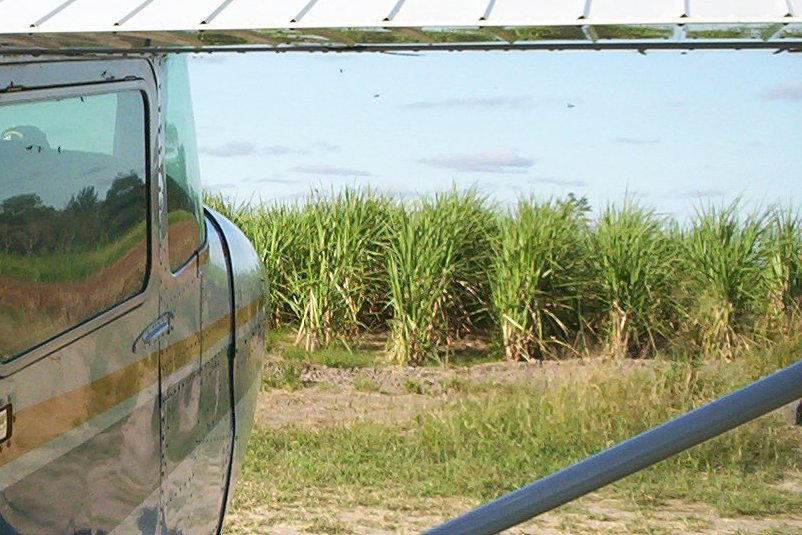
Sugar cane, Linea 14, Agua Dulce Region

Paraguay's largest reserves of undeveloped fertile forest and lowest land prices are found in Alto Paraguay. Agriculture and cattle farming have started to make inroads. The fertility of the Chaco's deep sedimentary soils is generally high, except in the westernmost parts, where there are very sandy soils, and in the eastern plain where there are some seasonal wetlands. Annual rainfall is sufficient in the east (around 1200 mm), fair in the center (around 900 mm) and scarce in the west (around 700 mm). A lack of infrastructure and roads is the primary limitation for farmers in the area.

Current agricultural expansion comes at the expense of the area's native forests. During the two decades between 1990 and 2010, Paraguay had one of the highest deforestation rates worldwide. The World Land Trust estimated 2008 deforestation in the Paraguay Chaco was over 200,000 hectares.

The department's most important activity is cattle ranching, extensive in the savannas of the east and intensive on the planted pastures of cleared land. Cultivation of sorghum, sugar cane and (in planning stage as of January 2009, for the arid west) jatropha are very recent developments.

== Districts ==
The department is divided into four districts:

1. Bahía Negra
2. Capitán Carmelo Peralta
3. Fuerte Olimpo
4. Puerto Casado

== See also ==
- List of high schools in Alto Paraguay
