= Route 22 (Paraguay) =

National route in Paraguay

National Route 22
- Ruta nacional PY22
- PY22 highlighted in red

Route information
- Length: 424 km (263 mi)
- Existed: 2019–present

Major junctions
- South end: San Estanislao
- North end: San Lázaro

Location
- Country: Paraguay

Highway system
- Highways in Paraguay

National Route 22 (officially, PY22) is a highway in Paraguay, which connects two northern departments of Paraguay, San Pedro and Concepción.

== History ==
With the Resolution N° 1090/19, it obtained its current number and elevated to National Route in 2019 by the MOPC (Ministry of Public Works and Communications).

== Distances, cities and towns ==
The following table shows the distances traversed by PY22 in each different department, showing cities and towns that it passes by (or near).

Km	City	Department	Junctions
0	San Estanislao	San Pedro	PY03
37	Itacurubí del Rosario	San Pedro	
50	Gral. Elizardo Aquino	San Pedro	
71	Villa del Rosario	San Pedro	
123	San Pablo	San Pedro	
142	San Pedro de Ycuamandiyú	San Pedro	PY11
222	Belén	Concepción	
241	Concepción	Concepción	PY05
263	Loreto	Concepción	
424	San Lázaro	Concepción	
