= Yataity del Norte =

- Location within Paraguay
- Coordinates: 24°12′0″S 56°34′0″W
- Country: Paraguay
- Department: San Pedro

Government
  - Intendente Municipal: Catalino Britez.

Area
  - Total: 263 km^{2} (102 sq mi)
- Elevation: 227 m (745 ft)

Population (2008)
  - Total: 14,373
  - Density: 23.68/km^{2} (61.3/sq mi)
- Time zone: -4
- Postal code: 8190

Yataity del Norte is a town and district in the San Pedro department of Paraguay, you can access this district by Route 8 "Dr. Blás Garay", like most people who were born and grew up on the side of the road, is a laborious community, which focuses on trade and agricultural production.

Founded December 22, 1965, it is located some 263 km from Asunción.

Yataity del Norte gateway to reach the colony Unión and the December 25, which leads to a precarious dirt road. Posts sales of fruit, quaint bars and restaurants where they offer tasty dishes of home cooking are points of attraction to make a stop on the road, before continuing the journey.

It is near the Arroyo Peñatei with a population of about 14.373 inhabitants. The vast majority are engaged in forestry, agriculture and livestock.

Its population is distributed as follows, corresponds to 52% male and 47% females. This situation is equal to what happens in most departments of the interior of the country, which has found greater female migration to urban centres, usually seeking to improve their living conditions and his family.

== Geography ==
Bordered on the north by the District of San Estanislao.

To the south lies the Fifth Department of Caaguazú.

To the east is separated from the Fifth Department of Caaguazú, by the stream Tapiracuá i.

To the west lies the District Union.

=== Hydrography ===
The Northern District Yataity, is washed by the waters of the following streams:

- Arroyo Pañatei.
- Arroyo Tapiracuái.

=== Roads ===
In the district of Yataity del Norte, can be accessed by Route 8 "Dr. Blás Garay", the other existing roads in the district are without pavement, roads are totally some kind of paving.

Today, this district has public transport services with services interdistrict services and newspapers until the country's capital, Ciudad del Este, Pedro Juan Caballero, Brazil, Argentina and Chile.

In communication, most have access to phone and now with satellite systems.

=== Climate ===
In the second department of San Pedro, the weather is predominantly rainy and humid. The same goes for the Northern District Yataity, that its climate is humid and rainy; the relative humidity is 70 to 80%. The average is 23 °C, the highest in summer is 35 °C and at least 10 °C.

== Economy ==
Much of the department of San Pedro, as well as the district's economy is mainly agricultural, occupying a prominent place in beef production, as well as its agriculture has increased considerably thanks to the fertility of its soil.

The city is a major centre of activity that includes livestock production coil, equine, swine, sheep.

In agriculture there are crops in the district of horticulture, oranges (sweet and sour), banana, sunflower, herb, matt, mandioca.

The Department of San Pedro is among those with lower socio-economic indicators, noted however that in recent years there have been significant advances, which allow people punished instead of acquiring better quality of life.

The 63% of the population is poor and the department while the rest of the population is not considered poor, the gaps are very marked, their average monthly income per family, the Guaraní sum of 490,812, representing an income per person Guaraní monthly average of 89,573.

== Language ==
Just as much of the population of the entire department of San Pedro, in the district of Yataity del Norte, also dominated the Guaraní language that approximately over 70% of the population speaks Spanish and Guaraní-(yopara) is spoken by 30% of the remaining population.

== Education ==
This district, as well as much of the second department of San Pedro, has primary schools, and also the average level, in which children and young people attending regularly, illiteracy exists is because of extreme poverty in which much of their people are mired, making it difficult to send their children to school, this affects especially women, but men are not exempt from this problem.

The indigenous bias also has access to primary education but with little notice by them, which is also due to the same reasons.

The working population lacks a reasonable level of qualification, which conspires against the development of the area, so it does not have trained manpower, lack of instructions or programs and projects related to the topic.

== Health ==
Throughout the second Department of San Pedro and not just in this district, which is perceived is a tremendous gap in these subjects, although must admit that in recent years show a marked improvement in the health sector. Currently the department has several posts and health centres, spread over much of the department of San Pedro, but will stress that they are equipped with a minimum, so that relative importance of care for the sick must be transferred to other care centres, usually in the capital and surrounding areas.

== Demography ==
The Yataity del Norte District, according to the National Housing Census for 2002 has a total population of 12,477 inhabitants in the urban area is the amount of 1,328 inhabitants, and in the rural area is 11,153 inhabitants.

Its rural population is 89.39% of the total population.

The total households in the district amounts to the amount of 2,492, of which corresponds to households in urban areas the number of 301, and in rural areas the number of 2,191 households, or representing 87.92% of the households are living in rural areas.

According to the projection of the district's total population, by gender and year have the following details:

- By the year 2008 the total population of 14,373 inhabitants, of whom 7,633 men and 6,740 women.
- By 2009, the total population of 14,460 inhabitants, of whom 6,682 men and 6,778 women.

As for the main socio-demographic indicators, district Yataity North has the following details:

- Population Less than 15 years 40.0%.
- Average of 3.2 children per woman.
- Illiterate 7.4%.
- Employed by the primary sector 76.0%.
- Employed by the secondary sector 5.5% .
- Employed in the tertiary sector 18.3%.
- Employed in agricultural work 75.9%.
- Homes with the electricity 77.9%.
- Homes with running water 13.5%.

== Bibliography ==
- The Journal News "che ret Paraguay."
- The Journal last minute "Geography of Paraguay."
- Publication of journalism Tiempos del Mundo.
- World Gazeteer: Paraguay – World-Gazetteer.com
