= Lima, Paraguay =

Lima
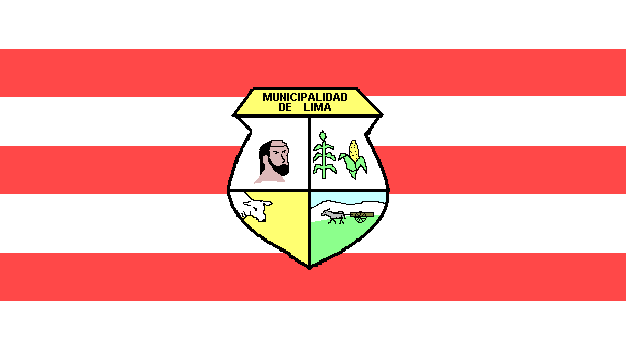
- Flag

- Location within Paraguay
- Coordinates: 23.900°S 56.333°W
- Country: Paraguay
- Department: San Pedro
- Founder: 1792 Fray Pedro Bartolomé

Government
  - Intendente municipal: Julio César Franco Sosa

Area
  - Total: 992 km^{2} (383 sq mi)

Population (2022)
  - Total: 10,303
  - Density: 10.4/km^{2} (26.9/sq mi)
- Time zone: -4 Gmt
- Postal code: 8430

Lima is a town and district of the San Pedro Department, Paraguay. It has about 10,000 inhabitants.

It is more than 330 km from Asunción. It was founded in 1792 and it is credited to Fray Pedro Bartolome, as a mission with Guanás Indians, on the shores of Aguaray River. Lima was founded in 1901, as the 2nd district.

== Geography ==
The district has an area of approximately 992 km^{2} (383 sq mi). It is bordered on the north by the District of Nueva Germania and the District of Santa Rosa del Aguaray, both districts separated by the Aguaray Guazú River. To the south are the District of San Pablo and the District of Choré. The Jejui Guazú River; separates the two districts. To the east lies the District General Isidro Resquín. At the west lies the District of San Pedro de Ycuamandiyú, and the District of Nueva Germania, the Aguaray Guazú River separates both districts.

The Jejuí Guazú River flows through Lima.

The climate is wet and rainy, the relative humidity is 70 to 80%. The average temperature is 23 °C, the highest in summer is 35 °C and the least is 10 °C.

== Demographics ==
The District of Lima, according to the National Housing Census for 2002 has a total population of 10,367 inhabitants. In the urban area the amount is of 2,131 inhabitants, and in the rural area is 8,236 inhabitants.

Its rural population is 79.44% of the total population.

The total households in the district amounts to the amount of 2,064, of which corresponds to households in urban areas the number of 506, and in rural areas the number of 1,558 households, representing 75.48% of the households living in rural areas.

The predominant language is Guarani, that is approximately spoken by the 80% of the population. Spanish and Guarani (Jopara) is spoken by 20% of the remaining population.

== History ==
It is one of the typical populations born at the end of eighteenth century to retain a strong Franciscan mark, while Choré and Guayaybi are notable for their intense agricultural production. Until today it retains its old adobe church, built in colonial times.

== Transport ==
The district is accessible by Route 3 General Elizardo Aquino, and Route No. 11 Juana de Lara.

Today, this district has public transport services with interdistrict services and daily services up to the country's capital, and also to Ciudad del Este Pedro Juan Caballero Brazil, Argentina and Chile.

The District has an airport (runway).

== Communal fields ==
At present, "INDERT", formerly the Rural Welfare Institute, has enabled the following: In 1984, by Resolution No. 1753, with an area of 146 ha. The Colony Sargento Montanía.

In 1998, by Resolution No. 1165, with an area of 179 ha. The Colony San Jose del Norte.

There are also colonies: Loma Clavel, with an area of 180 ha. Mayor Hermosa-COSTA PUCU with an area of 1167 hectares. And the Mayor of Hermosa-Sgto. Montania.

In the District of Lima, is the Ecological Reserve Capiitindy with an area of 102 hectares, which was created in 1995, by Resolution No. 1251.

=== Indigenous colonies ===
It is the community Avariyu with an area of 237 ha, in the years 1980 and 1991, by Resolution No. 789.799, and 1623 respectively.

== Economy ==
The city is a major center of activity that includes livestock production of cattle, horses, sheep and pigs.

In agriculture, there are crops in the district like mate, cotton, tobacco, sugar cane, cassava, sesame, cedrón Paraguay, soy, beans, potatoes, alfalfa, citrus, peanuts, wheat and cassava. Oranges; sour and sweet, and sunflower.

The main activity of its residents is the development of mate.

68.7% of the department's population is poor and the while the rest of the population is not considered poor, the needs are very marked, their average monthly income per family is of 496,645 Guaraní, representing a per person average monthly income of 95,915 Guaraní.

Livestock: cattle, horses, pigs.

== Tourism ==
The beaches that are watered by the River Aguaray Guazú are of white and crystal sand, which attracts domestic tourism. It also has health resorts, farms and a square that are the attractions of the city.

The health resort Raul Valiente has beaches on the River Aguaray and has Quinchos, sports fields, changing rooms, canteens, etc. It is a private place, managed by an association of taxi drivers.

As an attraction it retains its old adobe church, built in times of Spanish Colony, in honor of San Francisco and Virgen del Rosario, although a more modern temple has been built.
