= Route 5 (Paraguay) =

Road in Paraguay

National Route 05
- Ruta nacional PY05
- Gral. Bernardino Caballero
- PY05 highlighted in red

Route information
- Length: 577 km (359 mi)

Major junctions
- West end: Fortín Pilcomayo
- Route 9 in Pozo Colorado, PH; Route 3 in Yby Yaú, CO
- East end: Pedro Juan Caballero

Location
- Country: Paraguay

Highway system
- Highways in Paraguay

National Route 5 (in Spanish, Ruta Nacional Número 5 "Gral. Bernardino Caballero", or simply Ruta Quinta) is a highway in northern Paraguay, it runs from Fortín Pilcomayo to Pedro Juan Caballero. It crosses 3 departments, Presidente Hayes, Concepcion, and Amambay.

== Distances and important cities ==
The following table shows the distances traversed by National Route 5 in each different department, and important cities that it passes by (or near).

Km	City	Department	Junctions
0	Fortín Pilcomayo	Presidente Hayes	
48	Fortín Gral. Díaz	Presidente Hayes	PY12
101	Fortín Mayor Ávalos	Presidente Hayes	PY16
235	Pozo Colorado	Presidente Hayes	PY09
380	Concepción City	Concepcion	PY22
425	Horqueta	Concepcion	
492	Yby Yaú	Concepcion	PY08 (S)
531	Cruce Bella Vista	Amambay	PY08 (N)
577	Pedro Juan Caballero	Amambay	PY17
