= Route 11 (Paraguay) =

Road in Paraguay

National Route 11
- Ruta nacional PY11
- Juana de Lara
- PY11 highlighted in red.

Route information
- Length: 228 km (142 mi)

Major junctions
- West end: Antequera
- PY22 in San Pedro, SP PY08 in Santa Rosa, SP PY17 in Capitán Bado, AM
- East end: Capitán Bado

Location
- Country: Paraguay

Highway system
- Highways in Paraguay

National Route 11 (officially, PY11, simply known as Ruta Once) is a highway in Paraguay, which runs from Antequera to Capitán Bado.

== Distances, cities and towns ==
The following table shows the distances traversed by National Route 11 in each different department, showing cities and towns that it passes by (or near).

Department	City	km	Mile	Junctions
San Pedro	Antequera	0	0	
San Pedro	San Pedro	13	8	
San Pedro	Junction with PY22	32	20	PY22
San Pedro	Nueva Germania	60	38	
San Pedro	Santa Rosa del Aguaray	87	54	PY08
Amambay	Capitán Bado	228	143	PY17
