= Virginio Cáceres =

Paraguayan footballer (born 1962)

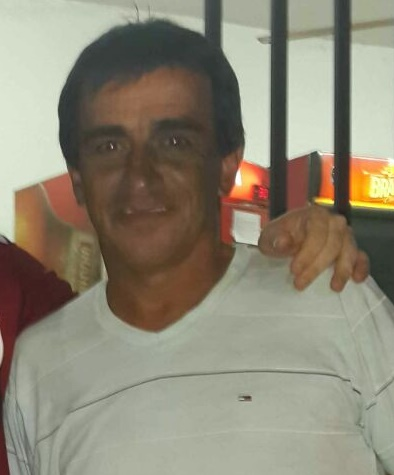
- Virginio Cáceres in 2017.

Personal information
- Full name: Virginio Cáceres Villalba
- Date of birth: 21 May 1962 (age 64)
- Place of birth: Itacurubí del Rosario, Paraguay
- Height: 1.75 m (5 ft 9 in)
- Position: Defender

Youth career
- 1979–1984: Sampedrana

Senior career*
Years	Team	Apps	(Gls)
1984–1989	Guaraní	155	(22)
1990–2002	Olimpia	402	(50)
Total		557	(72)

International career
1985–1989	Paraguay	45	(2)
- * Club domestic league appearances and goals

Virginio Cáceres Villalba (born 21 May 1962 in Itacurubí del Rosario) is a retired football defender from Paraguay.

Cáceres started his career in the regional league team from the San Pedro Department and arrived in Asunción at the start of 1984 and signed for Club Guaraní. He soon made an impact and helped the team capture the 1984 Paraguayan league title. In 1990, he signed for Olimpia Asunción, where he would eventually play until his retirement in 2002. In his at Olimpia he won several national and international titles that established him as one of the club's important players.

Virginio Cáceres was also of the Paraguay national football team that participated in the 1986 FIFA World Cup. Virginio also played several Copa América tournaments representing Paraguay.

== Titles ==
- Paraguayan League: 1984 (with Guaraní), 1993, 1995, 1997, 1998, 1999, 2000 (with Olimpia)
- Supercopa Sudamericana: 1990 (with Olimpia)
- Recopa Sudamericana: 1990 (with Olimpia)
- Copa Libertadores: 1990, 2002 (with Olimpia)
- Recopa Sudamericana: 2003 (with Olimpia)
