= Laguna Blanca (Paraguay) =

Ecological and tourist location of Paraguay

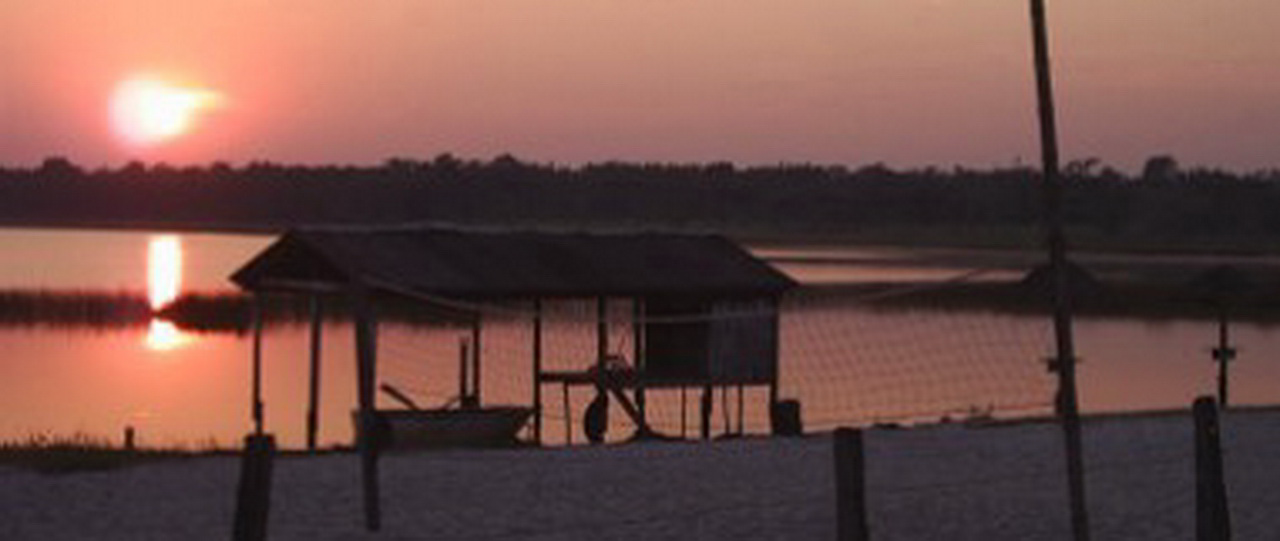

- Location within Paraguay
- Coordinates: 23°48′48″S 56°17′42″W
- Basin countries: Paraguay
- Surface area: 1.47 km^{2} (0.57 sq mi)
- Average depth: 7 m (23 ft)
- Surface elevation: 150 m (490 ft)

Laguna Blanca is an ecological and tourist location of Paraguay that comprehends an agricultural and cattle establishment, with a lake that is settled over calcareous sand, fact that makes the water completely transparent and apt for diving.

== Location ==
It is located in San Pedro Department, in the district Santa Rosa del Aguaray, about 28 kilometers east of the city of the same name.

== Description ==
The surface of the lake is about 147 hectares. It is considered by specialists to be the only natural lake of the country, because it does not have a thermostatic stratification, a depth of more than 7 meters or a source of its own. Because the lake is mostly spring-fed (the stream near the resort flows out, not in) its water is pure and drinkable without treatment.

There are private properties and a state reserve next to the lake. The private properties dedicate to agricultural and cattle activities. The state reserve, initially with a surface of 70 hectares, was occupied by rurals and even sold in parts to businessman of the region, so there is left just a small part of the surface that limits with the lake now.

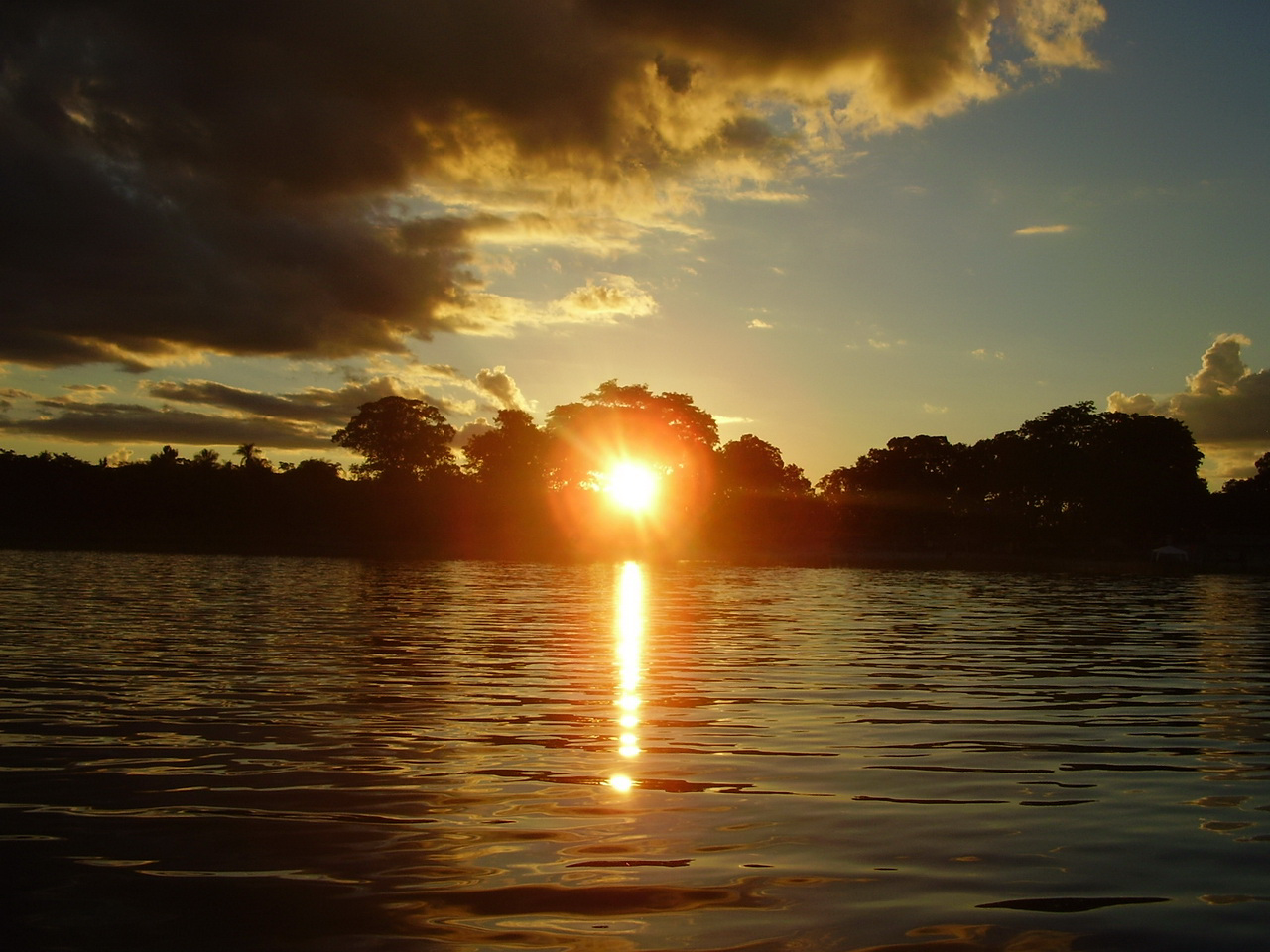

== Ecological importance ==
It has been determined as a priority area for conservation in the Plan Estratégico del Sistema Nacional de Áreas Silvestres Protegidas (SINASIP) (Law 352/94). Nowadays it is in process of being declared Natural Patrimony of Paraguay, with IDEA, Instituto de Desarrollo y Economía Ambiental) as its sponsor. It would be the second natural resource in obtaining this declaration: the first one was the Jejuí River.

This is one of the most studied places by national modern ornithology, due to the presence of great variety of native species of birds. Until this moment have been registered 283 species in Laguna Blanca, which constitutes one of the most representative places of the ecosystem called Cerrado in Paraguay. It is only comparable with San Luis National Park and the Mbaracayú Forest Natural Reserve. The Cerrado in Laguna Blanca is excellent; the remaining forest is relatively speaking still complete and includes a good number of water sources.

For a more complete list of birds and a bit of information about the resort:

About the fish species, there are fishes of small size such as pirañas, tare’yi and a variety of small piky.

According to the Mines and Energy Ministry of Paraguay, as well as the Environment Secretary, the entire area around the lake is area of reload of the Guaraní Aquifer, because the permeable soil allows filtering and feed the water reserve of this aquifer with the rain waters.

A Quick Ecological Evaluation was made of the place, concerning the age and kind of soil in the place, and also the fauna and flora, which are very interesting, with species such as the mboi yaguá (eunecters murinus) and drosera (a carnivorous plant). This study is in hands of the Natural Land Trust, entity that is working in the technical justification for the declaration of private reserve.

In addition, the organization Para la Tierra houses science interns who study the ecology of the region, particularly the animals. Contact them for further details.

== Tourism ==
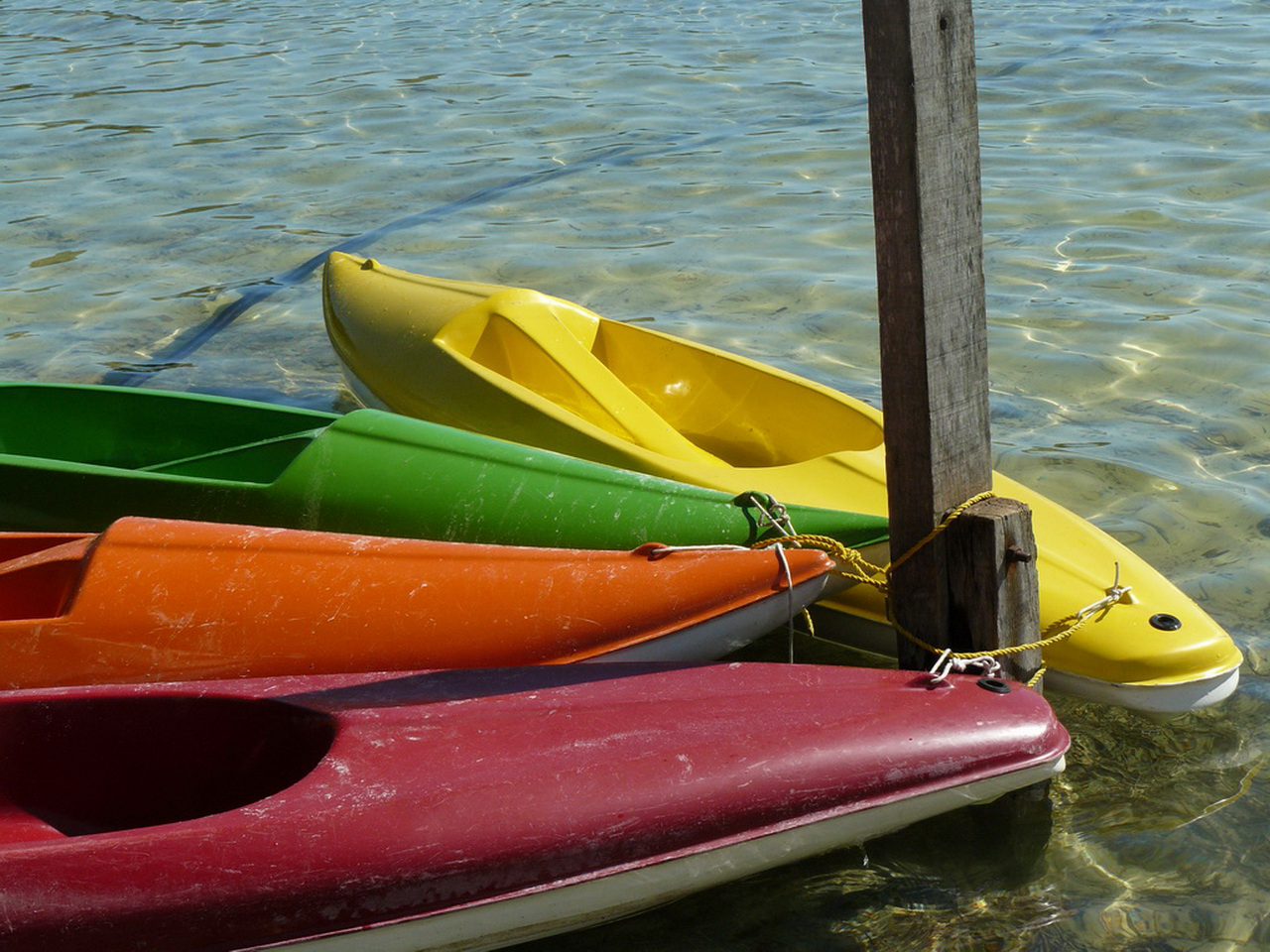
Kayac en el muelle

In Laguna Blanca Ranch, property of Duarte family since 1997, rural tourism started to develop. The Laguna Blanca Ranch has been a member of APATUR (Asociación Paraguaya de Turismo Rural) since its foundation and develops interesting activities for tourists. Nowadays Laguna Blanca in the process of being declared a Private Natural Reserve with the support of nongovernmental organizations, the Paraguayan Network of Private Land Preservation, the special support of IDEA, Natural Land Trust and Guyrá Paraguay.

The publishing of the discoveries made in this beautiful place in Paraguay has given it an international status that attracted a great number of scientists and tourists in the latest years. The place has been declared internationally “Important Bird Area”, and assigned the code PY030 Laguna Blanca. The IBA’s international program is created by Birdlife International, a lieder organization in the world in the knowledge of birds and their preservation. Guyra Paraguay is their representing in Paraguay.

== Activities for the visitors ==
There are many activities for visitors. Both camping sites and inns are available. Activities include outings, sports such as beach volleyball and soccer, horse rides, sailing boats and kayaks, underwater swimming, fishing, photographic safari, nautical sports and a stroll in the dunes.

Only activities that would not endanger the natural environment are allowed to be practiced and the activities that require specific professional guidance have to be booked previously.

== Services ==
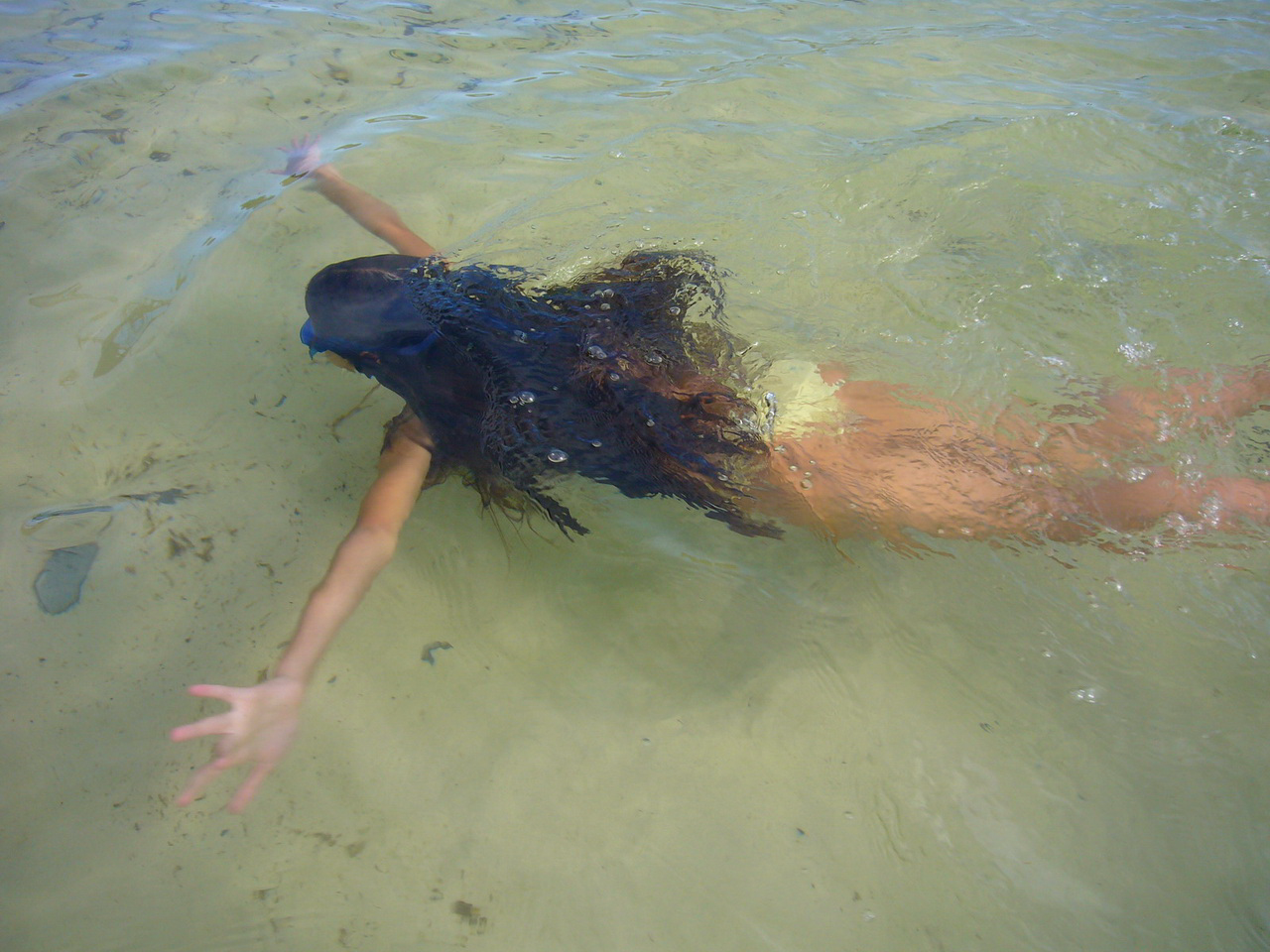
Transparent water of Laguna Blanca

The place has a camping area with capacity for about 40 families, besides rustic inns that offer breakfast, lunch and dinner, with special emphasis in Paraguayan traditional foods.

Longer-term stays for science interns and volunteers can be arranged at Para la Tierra.

== How to get to Laguna Blanca ==
The Laguna Blanca Ranch is in the northeast side of the San Pedro Department. From Asunción, the access is taking the North Access Route towards Arroyos y Esteros, then taking Route No. 3 and following until the crossroad Santa Rosa del Aguaray (270 kilometers from Asunción) and from there taking a 27 kilometers long pebbled road towards East. In dry weather the trip can be made in car; otherwise it should be made in high-clearance vehicles. There are also buses that go from Asunción to San Pedro or Pedro Juan Caballero that can take to Laguna Blanca, reaching Santa Rosa take another bus that goes to Santa Bárara (this bus is not of much circulation and it is not recommended to go on bus to the Ranch if had been done previously).
