= Nueva Germania =

District in the San Pedro Department of Paraguay

- Location within Paraguay
- Coordinates: 23°54′0″S 56°42′12″W
- Country: Paraguay
- Department: San Pedro
- Founded: 23 August 1887 by Bernhard Förster

Government
  - Intendente Municipal: Alicia González de Saíz (ANR)

Area
  - City: 657 km^{2} (254 sq mi)
- Elevation: 132 m (433 ft)

Population (2022)
  - Urban: 1,124
  - Rural: 4,566
  - Total: 5,690
- Time zone: -4 GMT
- Postal code: 8470
- Area code: (595) (44)

Nueva Germania (New Germania, German: Neugermanien) is a district of San Pedro Department in Paraguay. It was founded as a German settlement on 23 August 1887 by Bernhard Förster and Elisabeth Förster-Nietzsche to create a model community in the New World based on antisemitic eugenic ideas that were supposed to demonstrate the supremacy of German culture and society. In 1889, Förster committed suicide after the settlement's initial failure. After Förster's death and Nietzsche's return to Germany, the inhabitants took the management of the town into their own hands and distanced themselves from the ideas of its founders.

Because of its racist and eugenic antisemitic history, the town is often represented in sensationalist ways, which contemporary inhabitants reject.

== Geography ==
Nueva Germania is located about 297 kilometres from Asunción, capital of the Republic of Paraguay. It borders on

- Tacuatí district to the north;
- Lima district to the south, separated from it for the Aguaray Guazú River;
- Amambay department and the Santa Rosa del Aguaray district to the east;
- San Pedro de Ycuamandyyú district and the Tacuati district to the west.

The Nueva Germania district is watered by the rivers Aguaray Guazú and Aguaray mí, and the streams Tutytí and Empalado.

== History ==
Nueva Germania was founded in 1886 on the banks of the Aguaray-Guazú River, about 250 kilometres from Asunción by five, later fourteen, largely impoverished families from Saxony. Led by Bernhard Förster and his wife, Elisabeth Förster-Nietzsche, sister of the German philosopher Friedrich Nietzsche the German colonists emigrated to the Paraguayan rainforest to put to practice utopian ideas about the superiority of the Aryan race. It was the declared dream of Förster to create an area of Germanic development, far from the influence of Jews, whom he reviled. It was one of several closed German communities in Paraguay.

The colony's development was hampered by the harshness of the environment, a lack of proper supplies, and an overconfidence of the colonist's own supposed Aryan supremacy. Förster, who had negotiated the town's titles of property with General Bernardino Caballero, committed suicide only 3 years later in 1889 in the city of San Bernardino after abandoning the settlement.

=== 20th century ===
According to Gerard Posner, Josef Mengele, a German war criminal, spent some time in Nueva Germania while he was a fugitive after World War II. While Mengele did indeed briefly live in Hohenau, Paraguay (from 1959 to 1960), there is little evidence that Mengele ever lived in Nueva Germania.

=== 21st century ===
Today, Nueva Germania is a quiet and relatively poor agricultural community dedicated to the cultivation of yerba mate and soy beans and the raising of cattle, as well as the production of bricks. The two most common religions practiced are Catholicism and Lutheranism (the latter being practiced mostly by German descendants). The history of the town's foundation has led to the celebration of the mixture of German and Paraguayan cultures as a joint heritage of the town, with inhabitants often referring to themselves as Germanino. Depending on the situation, people identify as either, German, Paraguayan, or Germanino.

The primary languages spoken in Nueva Germania are Spanish, Guaraní (in the form of Jopara) and German. In everyday discourse, residents frequently blend these languages.

== Population ==
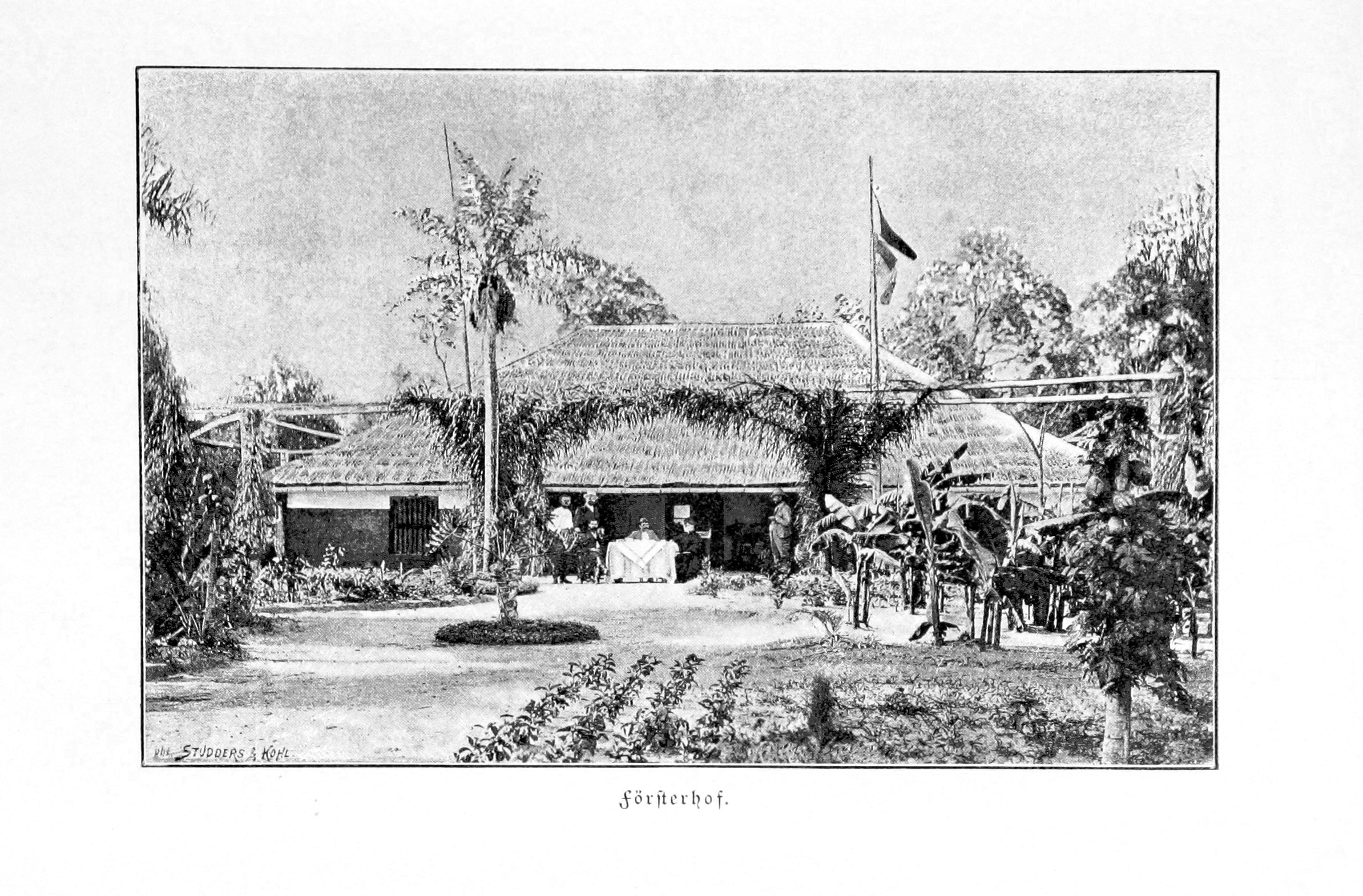
Nueva Germania town (1891)

The General Directorate of Statistics, Polls and Census has reported the following:

- In 1992 the district had 17,148 inhabitants, the majority of whom lived in the town of Santa Rosa del Aguaray. In 2002 Santa Rosa del Aguaray became a municipality in its own right. Consequently, the District of Nueva Germania lost most of its population and territory, though it retained the Mennonite colony Rio Verde to the north of Santa Rosa del Aguaray.
- The population is mostly rural and occupied in agricultural activities.
- The projected net population by gender for 2002 was 4,335 inhabitants (2,323 men and 2,012 women).

As of 2002, about 10% of Nueva Germania's inhabitants were of mainly German origin.

== See also ==
- Germans in Paraguay
- Colonia Independencia
- El Paraíso Verde, a 21st-century private colony established in Paraguay by German-speaking emigrants
- New Australia

== External links and further reading ==
- Ben Macintyre, Forgotten Fatherland: The Search for Elisabeth Nietzsche, New York: Farrar Straus Giroux 1992, reissued as Forgotten Fatherland: The True Story of Nietzsche's Sister and Her Lost Aryan Colony, Broadway 2011 ISBN 0307886441 ISBN 978-0307886446
- New York Times article on Nueva Germania, 1991
- New York Times article on Nueva Germania, 2013
- Brochure by the Protestant Parish of Dueren (in German), contains pictures
- Blog on Nueva Germania with photos
- Dialog International — "Dick Cheney and Nueva Germania"
- "Kultur, Jammed". The Walrus. April 2008. Archived from the original on 2008-05-13. (article deleted)
- Kraus, Daniela, Bernhard und Elisabeth Försters Nueva Germania in Paraguay. Eine antisemitische Utopie. PhD Thesis. University of Vienna. 1999
- Sussman, Nadia and Simon Romero, 2013, "A Lost Colony in Paraguay" Video: "A Lost Tribe in Paraguay"
