= El Paraíso =

El Paraíso is Spanish for "The Paradise." The name may refer to:

== Places ==
- El Paraíso, Caracas, a parish of Libertador Bolivarian Municipality, Caracas, Venezuela
- El Paraíso, Chalatenango, El Salvador
- El Paraíso, Copán, Honduras
- El Paraíso Department, Honduras
- El Paraíso, El Paraíso, Honduras
- El Paraíso, a community of Omoa, Honduras
- El Paraíso, Peru
- El Paraíso, Romita, Guanajuato, Mexico
- El Paraíso Verde, Caazapá Department, Paraguay
- El Paraíso, Buenos Aires, Argentina

== Other uses ==
- El Paraíso Airport, an airport near El Paraíso, Beni, Bolivia
- El Paraiso Open, a 1974 golf tournament at El Paraiso Golf Club in Marbella, Spain
- El Paraíso Verde, a community in the Caazapá department of Paraguay
- El paraíso (2022 film), an Argentine animated film
- El paraíso (2023 film), an Italian neo-noir film

== See also ==
- Paraíso (disambiguation)
