= San Pablo District, Paraguay =

San Pablo
- Flag Coat of arms

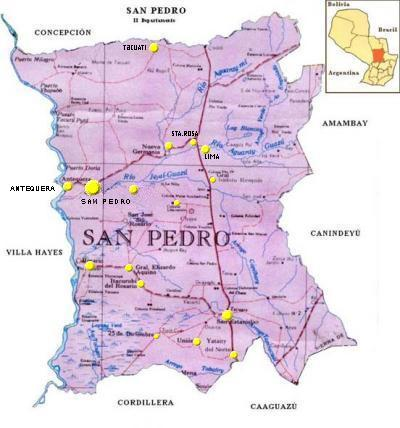
- Coordinates: 24°9′0″S 57°4′12″W
- Country: Paraguay
- Department: San Pedro

Government
  - Intendente municipal: Quintín Bernardino Guerrero González (ANR)

Area
  - Total: 603 km^{2} (233 sq mi)
- Elevation: 227 m (745 ft)

Population (2022)
  - Total: 3,415
  - Density: 5.66/km^{2} (14.7/sq mi)
- Time zone: -4 GMT
- Postal code: 8060

San Pablo is a district of the San Pedro Department, Paraguay. It includes the village of San Pablo or San Pedro de Ycuamandiyú, which has a population of around 680, located around 330 km from the city of Asunción.

The district is located on the Jejuí Guazú River and has about 3,400 inhabitants. Its soil is suitable for agriculture.

== Geography ==
The district of San Pablo has an area of 603 km² and a population density of 7.2 people per square kilometer. It is located in the center of the department San Pedro, although the region was the victim of a process of rapid deforestation in the past, it includes one of the richest reserves of forest that are profitable. They attract exploitation and marketing force due to the forests.

In the region there are areas of agricultural use and low prairies that often flood.

To the north it borders with the district of San Pedro de Ycuamandiyú, which separates the Jejuí Guazú River. To the south lies the district of Villa del Rosario. To the east lies the district of Choré. To the west, the district of Antequera.

The climate is predominantly rainy and humid. The relative humidity is 70 to 80%. The average is 23 °C; the highest in summer is 38 °C and at least 10 °C.

== Transport ==
The district has the following ports: Puerto Tayi and Puerto La Niña, which are used to trade their agricultural production, and as a means of internal communication, which communicates with the districts in the area.

This district is accessible by unpaved roads and internal roads that are also unpaved, being used as secondary rural roads. The embankment roads communicate all districts with each other and other national routes.

Currently, this district has public transport services between districts and regular services to the country's capital, in addition to Ciudad del Este Pedro Juan Caballero Brazil, Argentina and Chile.

== Education ==
The district has elementary schools and high school level, in which children and young people attend regularly.

The illiteracy is due to extreme poverty which makes it difficult to send children to school, which particularly affects women. The indigenous tribes also have access to primary education but with little attendance.

The working population lacks a reasonable level of qualification, which conspires against the development of the area, so it does not have trained manpower.

== Demographics ==
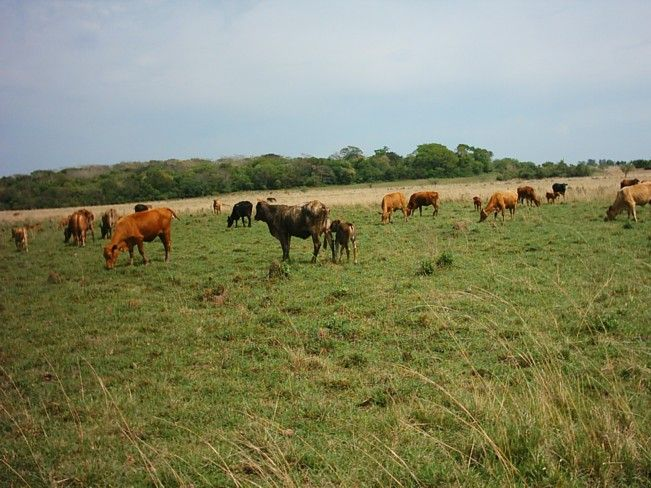
San Pedro

By 2022, the total population is 3,415 inhabitants.

It has enabled a colony by the IBR, currently INDERT, which has an area of 6,495 hectares and with an amount of 400 lots.

Its rural population is 83.08% of the total population.

The total number of households in the district rises to the amount of 713, of which 143 of them are in urban areas, and in rural areas there are 570, which represents the 79.94% of homes that are settled in rural areas.

The district predominates Guarani language which is spoken by about 80% of the inhabitants and the Castilian-Guarani (Jopara), spoken by 20% of the remaining population.

== Economy and politics ==
It is one of the districts that has lower socio-economic indicators, however, in recent years there have been major advances, allowing the inhabitants to acquire a better quality of life.

In the district of San Pablo, a large percentage of the population is poor (77.9%); having a monthly average income per family of 408,487 Guarani, and 73,834 Guarani per person.

Its economy is essentially agricultural and it has increased considerably thanks to the fertility of its soil and the projects of creating new colonies. Its main agricultural products are: cotton, tobacco, soybeans, mate, cassava, sunflower, sour orange and sweet orange.

San Pablo District's mayor is Quentin Bernardino Gonzalez Guerrero for the election period from 2006 to 2010.

== Tourism ==
The main tourist attraction of San Pablo are the beaches on the river Jejui Guazú, for their less polluted waters, which together with its white sand beaches make it a perfect place to cool and relax in the summer season.

== Sources ==
- World Gazeteer: Paraguay – World-Gazetteer.com
