= Capitán Carmelo Peralta =

- District
- Location within Paraguay
- Country: Paraguay
- Department: Alto Paraguay
- Time zone: -3 Gmt

Capitán Carmelo Peralta, commonly known as Carmelo Peralta, is a Paraguayan city and district situated on the banks of the Paraguay River, on the border with Porto Murtinho, Mato Grosso do Sul, Brazil, approximately 716 km from Asunción, in the department of Alto Paraguay, Paraguay.

It is known as "The Gateway to the Pantanal" or "The Pantanal City," as from here, visitors can access the Pantanal, which is the largest wetland in the world, shared between Paraguay, Brazil, and Bolivia.

In this locality, the PY15 "Bioceanic" route begins, crossing the Paraguayan Chaco from east to west, ending at the town of Pozo Hondo, on the border with Argentina.

== Toponymy ==
It is named in honor of Carmelo Peralta, a distinguished Paraguayan military aviator from Quiindy, who served during the Chaco War with the rank of Captain in the Paraguayan Air Force.

He was later promoted to Major and served as the personal pilot for President José Félix Estigarribia and his wife Julia Miranda Cueto, with whom he died in an air crash on September 7, 1940, at the age of 30. He was posthumously promoted to the immediately superior rank of Lieutenant Colonel.

== History ==
The first settlers arrived in 1898, initially comprising 12 families, among which a Brazilian woman named Margarita was the first to settle on the island now bearing her name, Margarita Island.

A Paraguayan map from 1933 (during the Chaco War) shows the area of Carmelo Peralta named as Puerto Eduardo, functioning as a cattle ranch.

The current town of Carmelo Peralta was officially founded in 1940, opposite the Brazilian locality of Porto Murtinho.

During that time, the Anglo-Argentine company The River Plate Quebracho Company S.A. also operated in the area, extracting quebracho trees for the production of tannin, a substance used for converting raw animal hides into leather in a process known as tanning.

In 1948, the Apostolic Vicariate of the Paraguayan Chaco was created, with its first bishop being Monsignor Ángel Muzzolón, a Salesian of Uruguayan origin. During his episcopate from 1956 to 1962, the first contacts were made with the Ayoreo indigenous people near Fortín Madrejón in the Boreal Chaco. In 1963, due to droughts, the Salesians moved their mission to Puerto María Auxiliadora, 30 km south of Carmelo Peralta, along the Paraguay River near Cerro Siete Cabezas, and the evangelized Ayoreo indigenous people relocated there.

In 1974, an attempt was made to establish a Paraguayan colony named Colonia Francisco Careaga Chávez near Cerro Siete Cabezas, but ten years later, most of the lands were sold to Brazilian businesses.

Carmelo Peralta was administratively part of the district of Puerto Casado until May 2, 2008, when it became a municipality, according to Law No. 3,471.

== Geography ==
It is located on the western (right) bank of the Paraguay River, bordering Porto Murtinho, Mato Grosso do Sul, Brazil. It borders Coronel Cabral and Toro Pampa to the northwest, Puerto Guaraní and Fuerte Olimpo to the north, and Porto Murtinho in Brazil to the northeast, east, and southeast, and to the south with Puerto María Auxiliadora and Puerto La Esperanza, to the southwest with Coronel Paulino Alén (Cruce Paragro) and to the west with Mayor Hilario Amarilla (Cruce 65), respectively.

== Economy ==
The majority of the inhabitants of Carmelo Peralta engage in cattle ranching, agriculture, fishing, tourism, handicraft sales, boat trips, and trade with Brazil.

== Demographics ==
The population comprises Paraguayan criollos, indigenous people from the Ayoreo ethnicity, and Brazilian ranchers; it has a population of around five thousand inhabitants.

In addition to its main urban center, the municipality also includes more remote populations within its territory, such as:

- Puerto La Esperanza (formerly Puerto Sastre) with 800 inhabitants.
- Colonia Monseñor Ángel Muzzolón with 50 inhabitants.
- Puerto María Auxiliadora (Cucaani Indigenous Community) with 50 inhabitants.
- Mayor Hilario Amarilla (Cruce 65) (Detour to Bahía Negra) with 40 inhabitants.

== Infrastructure ==
Currently, with the paving of route PY15 and the ongoing construction of the Bioceanic Bridge with Brazil, the district is rapidly developing, attracting many companies investing in the area, creating real estate developments, hotels, restaurants, warehouses, minimarkets, service stations, mechanical workshops, and retail stores for imported products, among others.

The locality also has several public institutions, such as schools, colleges, health centers, a police station, a justice of the peace court, and churches, among others.

It has a small dirt airstrip about 1,300 meters long for regional air transport. There are plans to build a modern airport outside the city in the future, featuring an asphalt runway, which will serve as the main air terminal for cargo and passenger transport in the region.

== See also ==
- Districts of Paraguay
