= Route 12 (Paraguay) =

Road in Paraguay

National Route 12
- Ruta nacional PY12
- PY12 highlighted in red

Route information
- Length: 744 km (462 mi)

Major junctions
- Southeast end: Chaco'i
- Northwest end: Pozo Hondo

Location
- Country: Paraguay

Highway system
- Highways in Paraguay

National Route 12 (officially, PY12, better known as Ruta Doce) is a highway in Paraguay, which runs from Chaco'i, part of the district of Villa Hayes, to Pozo Hondo, part of the district of Dr. Pedro P. Peña, connecting the western Chaco region to the metropolitan area of Asunción. It's currently paved only from Chaco'i to Tinfunqué National Park.

== Distances, cities and towns ==
The following table shows the distances traversed by PY12 in each different department, showing cities and towns that it passes by (or near).

Km	City	Department	Junctions
0	Chaco'i	Presidente Hayes	
6	José Falcón	Presidente Hayes	PY09
144	Gral. Bruguez	Presidente Hayes	
274	Tte. Esteban Martínez	Presidente Hayes	
304	Tte. Rojas Silva	Presidente Hayes	
413	Fortín Gral. Diaz	Boquerón	PY05
714	Doctor Pedro P. Peña	Boquerón	
744	Pozo Hondo	Boquerón	PY15
