= Route 8 (Paraguay) =

Highway in Paraguay

National Route 08
- Ruta nacional PY08
- Dr. Blas Garay
- PY08 highlighted in red.

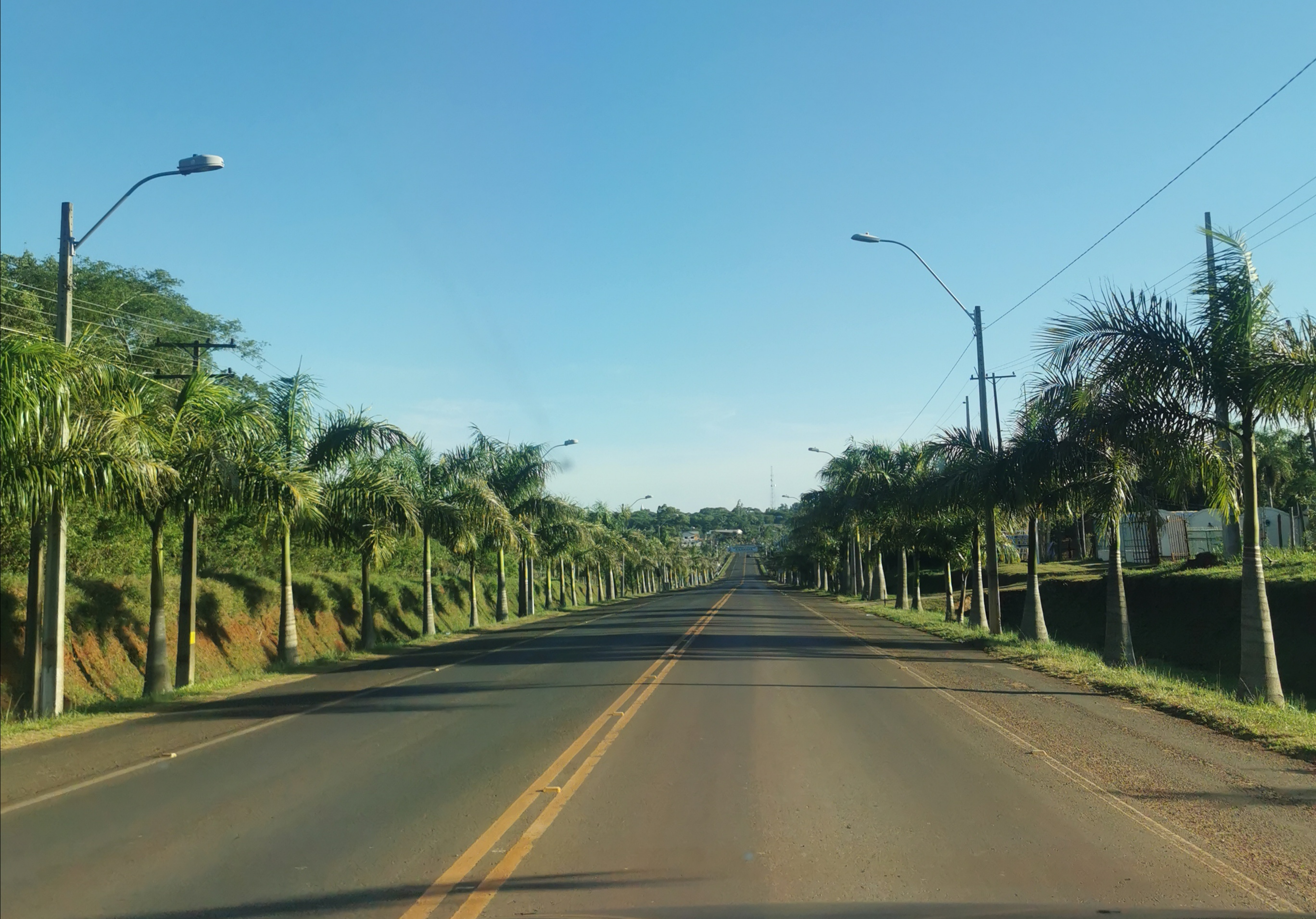
- PY08 near the city of Caazapá.

Route information
- Length: 320 km (200 mi)

Major junctions
- North end: San Estanislao
- Route 3 in San Estanislao, SP Route 2 and Route 7 in Coronel Oviedo, CG Route 1 in Coronel Bogado, IT
- South end: Coronel Bogado

Location
- Country: Paraguay

Highway system
- Highways in Paraguay

National Route 8 (officially, Ruta Nacional Número 8 "Dr. Blas Garay", simply known as Ruta Ocho) is a highway in Paraguay, which runs from Bella Vista Norte to Coronel Bogado. It mainly connects the north and the south regions of Eastern Paraguay. It crosses seven departments and has a total length of 634 kilometres (394 miles).

== Distances, cities and towns ==
The following table shows the distances traversed by National Route 8 in each different department, showing cities and towns that it passes by (or near).

Km	City	Department	Junctions
0	Bella Vista Norte	Amambay	MS-384 (Brazil)
76	San Vicente	Amambay	Route 5
115	Yby Yaú	Concepción	Route 5
155	Azotey	Concepción	
213	Santa Rosa del Aguaray	San Pedro	Route 11
300	San Estanislao	San Pedro	Route 3
356	Simón Bolívar	Caaguazú	Route 21
406	Coronel Oviedo	Caaguazú	Route 2
438	Mbocayaty	Guairá	Route 10
443	Villarrica	Guairá	Route 10
472	Ñumí	Guairá	Route 18
499	Caazapá	Caazapá	
570	Yuty	Caazapá	
583	Leandro Oviedo	Itapúa	
597	San Pedro del Paraná	Itapúa	
607	General Artigas	Itapúa	
634	Coronel Bogado	Itapúa	Route 1
