= ISO 3166-2:PY =

Entry for Paraguay in ISO 3166-2

ISO 3166-2:PY is the entry for Paraguay in ISO 3166-2, part of the ISO 3166 standard published by the International Organization for Standardization (ISO), which defines codes for the names of the principal subdivisions (e.g., provinces or states) of all countries coded in ISO 3166-1.

Currently for Paraguay, ISO 3166-2 codes are defined for one capital and 17 departments. The capital of the country Asunción has special status equal to the departments.

Each code consists of two parts separated by a hyphen. The first part is PY, the ISO 3166-1 alpha-2 code of Paraguay. The second part is either of the following:

- one or two digits (1–16, 19): departments
- three letters: capital district

== Current codes ==
Subdivision names are listed as in the ISO 3166-2 standard published by the ISO 3166 Maintenance Agency (ISO 3166/MA).

Click on the button in the header to sort each column.

| Code | Subdivision name (es) | Subdivision name (en) (Note: For reference only, English name not included in the ISO 3166-2 standard.) | Subdivision category |
|---|---|---|---|
| PY-16 | Alto Paraguay | Upper Paraguay | department |
| PY-10 | Alto Paraná | Upper Parana | department |
| PY-13 | Amambay | Amambay | department |
| PY-ASU | Asunción | Asuncion | capital |
| PY-19 | Boquerón | Boqueron | department |
| PY-5 | Caaguazú | Caaguazu | department |
| PY-6 | Caazapá | Caazapa | department |
| PY-14 | Canindeyú | Canindeyu | department |
| PY-11 | Central | Central | department |
| PY-1 | Concepción | Concepcion | department |
| PY-3 | Cordillera | Cordillera | department |
| PY-4 | Guairá | Guaira | department |
| PY-7 | Itapúa | Itapua | department |
| PY-8 | Misiones | Misiones | department |
| PY-12 | Ñeembucú | Neembucu | department |
| PY-9 | Paraguarí | Paraguari | department |
| PY-15 | Presidente Hayes | President Hayes | department |
| PY-2 | San Pedro | Saint Peter | department |

== See also ==
- Subdivisions of Paraguay
- FIPS region codes of Paraguay
- Neighbouring countries: AR, BO, BR
