= Liberación =

Coordinates: 24°12′S 56°26′W

- District
- Location within Paraguay
- Country: Paraguay
- Department: San Pedro
- Time zone: -4 Gmt

Liberación is a district in the department of San Pedro, Paraguay.
