= Route 13 (Paraguay) =

Highway in Paraguay

National Route 13
- Ruta nacional PY13
- PY13 highlighted in red

Route information
- Length: 246 km (153 mi)

Major junctions
- South end: Paso Yobai
- North end: Ypehú

Location
- Country: Paraguay

Highway system
- Highways in Paraguay

National Route 13 (officially, PY13, better known as Ruta Trece) is a highway in Paraguay, which runs from Paso Yobai to Ypehú, connecting the departments of Guairá, Caaguazú and Canindeyú.

== History ==
With the Resolution N° 1090/19, it obtained its current number and elevated to National Route in 2019 by the MOPC (Ministry of Public Works and Communications).

== Distances, cities and towns ==
The following table shows the distances traversed by PY13 in each different department, showing cities and towns that it passes by (or near).

| Km | City | Department | Junctions |
|---|---|---|---|
| 0 | Paso Yobai | Guairá | PY10 |
| 29 | Repatriación | Caaguazú | |
| 40 | Caaguazú | Caaguazú | PY02 |
| 89 | Yhú | Caaguazú | PY21 (West) |
| 100 | Vaquería | Caaguazú | PY21 (East) |
| 166 | Curuguaty | Canindeyú | PY03 |
| 180 | Villa Ygatimí | Canindeyú | |
| 246 | Ypehú | Canindeyú | PY17 |
