= Route 17 (Paraguay) =

Highway in Paraguay

National Route 17
- Ruta nacional PY17

Route information
- Length: 380 km (240 mi)

Major junctions
- Southeast end: Salto del Guairá
- North end: Pedro Juan Caballero

Location
- Country: Paraguay

Highway system
- Highways in Paraguay

National Route 17 (officially, PY17, simply known as Ruta de la Soberanía) is a highway in Paraguay, which runs from Salto del Guairá to Pedro Juan Caballero, both on the border with Brazil. It has an extension of 380 km (240 mi), in the northeast of the Eastern Region. The entire route is adjacent to the Maracayú and Amambai Mountains.

== History ==
With the Resolution N° 1090/19, it obtained its current number and elevated to National Route in 2019 by the MOPC (Ministry of Public Works and Communications).

== Distances, cities and towns ==
The following table shows the distances traversed by National Route 17 in each different department, showing cities and towns that it passes by (or near).

Km	City	Department	Junctions
0	Salto del Guairá	Canindeyú	PY03
121	Pindoty Porá	Canindeyú	PY07
180	Ypehú	Canindeyú	PY13
210	Itanará	Canindeyú	
258	Capitán Bado	Amambay	PY11
380	Pedro Juan Caballero	Amambay	PY05
