= List of highways in Paraguay =

List of highways in Paraguay, sorted by the official number designation given by the MOPC (Ministry of Public Works and Communications):

The 22 National Routes of Paraguay.

== Types of Highways ==
- National routes.
- Departmental routes.
- Neighborhood roads.
- Municipal roads.

== List of highways ==
=== National Routes ===
- PY01
- PY02
- PY03
- PY04
- PY05
- PY06
- PY07
- PY08
- PY09
- PY10
- PY11
- PY12
- PY13
- PY14
- PY15
- PY16
- PY17
- PY18
- PY19
- PY20
- PY21
- PY22

=== Departmental Routes ===
- D001
- D002
- D003
- D004
- D005
- D006
- D007
- D008
- D009
- D010
- D011
- D012
- D013
- D014
- D015
- D016
- D017
- D018
- D019
- D020
- D021
- D022
- D023
- D024
- D025
- D026
- D027
- D028
- D029
- D030
- D031
- D032
- D033
- D034
- D035
- D036
- D037
- D038
- D039
- D040
- D041
- D042
- D043
- D044
- D045
- D046
- D047
- D048
- D049
- D050
- D051
- D052
- D053
- D054
- D055
- D056
- D057
- D058
- D059
- D060
- D061
- D062
- D063
- D064
- D065
- D066
- D067
- D068
- D069
- D070
- D071
- D072
- D073
- D074
- D075
- D076
- D077
- D078
- D079
- D080
- D081
- D082
- D083
- D084
- D085
- D086
- D087
- D088
- D089
- D090
- D091
- D092
- D093
- D094
- D095
- D096
