= Villa del Rosario, Paraguay =

Coordinates: 24°25′S 57°07′W

Villa del Rosario
- District
- Location within Paraguay
- Country: Paraguay
- Department: San Pedro
- Time zone: -4 Gmt

Villa del Rosario is a district in the department of San Pedro, Paraguay.
