= Route 14 (Paraguay) =

National route in Paraguay

National Route 14
- Ruta nacional PY14
- PY14 highlighted in red

Route information
- Length: 425 km (264 mi)
- Existed: 2019–present

Major junctions
- East end: Bahía Negra
- West end: Fortín Gabino Mendoza

Location
- Country: Paraguay

Highway system
- Highways in Paraguay

National Route 14 (officially, PY14) is one of the northernmost highways of all Paraguay's 22 national routes, which connects towns in northern Alto Paraguay department.

== History ==
With the Resolution N° 1090/19, it obtained its current number and elevated to National Route in 2019 by the MOPC (Ministry of Public Works and Communications).

== Distances, cities and towns ==
The following table shows the distances traversed by PY14 in each different department, showing cities and towns that it passes by (or near).

Km	City	Department	Junctions
0	Bahía Negra	Alto Paraguay	
173	Fortín Agua Dulce	Alto Paraguay	PY16
283	Fortín Mayor Lagerenza	Alto Paraguay	
425	Fortín Gabino Mendoza	Alto Paraguay	
