= Route 15 (Paraguay) =

National route in Paraguay

National Route 15
- Ruta nacional PY15
- PY15 highlighted in red

Route information
- Length: 531 km (330 mi)
- Existed: 2019–present

Major junctions
- East end: Carmelo Peralta
- West end: Pozo Hondo

Location
- Country: Paraguay

Highway system
- Highways in Paraguay

National Route 15 also known as Corredor Bioceánico (officially, PY15) is one of 22 national routes of Paraguay. The international bridge that will connect Carmelo Peralta with Porto Murtinho is under construction as of June 2026. This highway is expected to become an important international trade route by becoming part of the Bi-Oceanic Corridor, and being the shortest passage between the Chilean ports of Antofagasta and Iquique on the Pacific Ocean and the Brazilian port of Santos on the Atlantic Ocean.

== History ==
With the Resolution N° 1090/19, the route obtained its current number and was elevated to the status of National Route in 2019 by the MOPC (Ministry of Public Works and Communications).

In February 2022, Paraguay inaugurated 275 km (171 mi) of the road (about half of the route), connecting Carmelo Peralta, on the border with Brazil, to Loma Plata, in the center of the country.In 2025, another 224 km were already being paved between the cities of Mariscal Estigarribia and Pozo Hondo, on the border with Argentina, with completion scheduled for 2026, basically completing the road.

== Distances, cities and towns ==
The following table shows the distances traversed by PY15 in each different department, showing cities and towns that it passes by (or near).

Km	City	Department	Junctions
0	Carmelo Peralta	Alto Paraguay	
245	Fortín Teniente Montanía	Alto Paraguay	PY16
313	Mariscal Estigarribia	Boquerón	PY09
531	Pozo Hondo	Boquerón	PY12
