= Yrybucuá =

Coordinates: 24°29′S 56°05′W

- District
- Location within Paraguay
- Country: Paraguay
- Department: San Pedro
- Time zone: UTC-3 (PYT)

Yrybucuá is a district in the department of San Pedro, Paraguay.
