= List of regions of Paraguay by Human Development Index =

This is a list of regions of Paraguay by Human Development Index as of 2024.

Rank	Region	HDI (2023)
High human development
1	Central (Asunción, Central)	0.793
–	Paraguay	0.756
2	South-East (Guairá, Misiones, Paraguarí, Ñeembucú)	0.743
3	South-West (Caazapá, Itapúa)	0.739
4	North-East (Caaguazú, Alto Paraná, Canindeyú)	0.735
5	North-West (Boquerón, Alto Paraguay, Presidente Hayes, Concepción, Amambay, San Pedro, Cordillera)	0.730
