= Bernhard Förster =

German teacher and antisemitic activist (1843–1889)

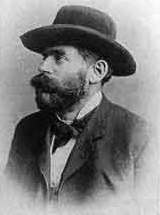
- Born: Ludwig Bernhard Förster; 31 March 1843; Delitzsch, Province of Saxony
- Died: 3 June 1889 (aged 46); San Bernardino, Paraguay
- Cause of death: Suicide
- Known for: Founder of Nueva Germania
- Spouse: Elisabeth Förster-Nietzsche

Ludwig Bernhard Förster (31 March 1843 – 3 June 1889) was a German teacher and antisemitic activist. He was married to Elisabeth Förster-Nietzsche, the sister of the philosopher Friedrich Nietzsche.

== Life ==
Förster became a leading figure in the antisemitic faction on the far right of German politics and wrote on the Jewish question, characterizing Jews as constituting a "parasite on the German body". In order to support his beliefs he set up the Deutscher Volksverein (German People's League) in 1881 with Max Liebermann von Sonnenberg.

In 1883, Förster left Germany in order to emigrate to Paraguay, when his antisemitic beliefs resulted in ostracism and loss of his teaching job. After searching the country for many months, Förster found a suitable site to establish a settlement. It was 600 square kilometres and almost 300 kilometres north of Asunción. The settlement was to become known as "Nueva Germania". Förster returned to Germany in March 1885 and married Elisabeth Nietzsche on 22 May. The couple assembled a group of "pioneers" who shared their antisemitic views and wished to live in a new "Fatherland" where an Aryan could prosper. They travelled to Paraguay from Hamburg in February 1887.

== Vegetarian colony ==
In 1887, Förster and his wife Elisabeth established a vegetarian colony in Paraguay in which only Germans of pure Aryan ancestry were to be admitted. The colony suffered from internal conflict and only a few of the colonists embraced vegetarianism. In 1886, Förster and Elisabeth published German Colonisation in the Upper La Plata District with Particular Reference to Paraguay: The Results of Detailed Practical Experience, Work and Travel 1883–1885. By the late 1880s the colony was almost bankrupt and Förster began to sell fresh meat to supplement his income. He abandoned vegetarianism and returned to eating meat. Despite the failings of the colony, Elisabeth still appealed for financial support for the colony in 1893.

== Death ==
The initiative failed for many reasons, not least the harsh environment. Förster, beleaguered with debts, drank heavily and became depressed. He eventually committed suicide by poisoning himself with morphine and strychnine in his room at the Hotel del Lago in San Bernardino, Paraguay, on 3 June 1889. After his death, his widow Elisabeth wrote a book entitled Bernhard Förster's Colony New Germany in Paraguay. Intended to salvage Förster's reputation by portraying him as a hero, it was published in 1891.
