= Route 3 (Paraguay) =

Road in Paraguay

National Route 03
- Ruta nacional PY03
- Gral. Elizardo Aquino
- PY03 highlighted in red

Route information
- Length: 413 km (257 mi)

Major junctions
- Southwest end: Asunción
- PY09 in Mariano R. Alonso, CE PY21 in Juan de Mena, CR; PY22 and PY08 in San Estanislao, SP; PY13 in Curuguaty, CY; PY07 in Katueté, CY PY17 and BR-163 in Salto del Guairá, CY
- Northeast end: Salto del Guairá

Location
- Country: Paraguay

Highway system
- Highways in Paraguay

National Route 3 (officially, PY03, better known as Ruta Tres) is a highway in Paraguay, which runs from Asunción to the border city of Salto del Guairá, the capital of the Canindeyú Department. It crosses the Capital District and 4 departments. It has many junctions with other national routes.

== Distances, cities and towns ==
The following table shows the distances traversed by PY03 in each different department, showing cities and towns that it passes by (or near).

Km	City	Department	Junctions
0	Asunción	Capital District	
14	Mariano Roque Alonso	Central	PY09
21	Limpio	Central	
36	Emboscada	Cordillera	
65	Arroyos y Esteros	Cordillera	
85	Juan de Mena	Cordillera	PY21
116	Veinticinco de Diciembre	San Pedro	
151	San Estanislao	San Pedro	PY22 and PY08
203	Yrybucuá	San Pedro	
223	Yasy Cañy	Canindeyú	
245	Curuguaty	Canindeyú	PY13
357	Katueté	Canindeyú	PY07
371	Gral. Francisco Caballero A.	Canindeyú	
376	La Paloma	Canindeyú	
413	Salto del Guairá	Canindeyú	PY17 and BR-163
