= Teniente Esteban Martínez =

- District
- Location within Paraguay
- Coordinates: 23°46′31″S 58°36′43″W
- Country: Paraguay
- Department: Presidente Hayes
- Founded: 12 September 2006

Government
  - Intendente Municipal: Carlos Martínez Solalinde (PLRA)

Area
  - Total: 8,142 km^{2} (3,144 sq mi)
- Elevation: 123 m (404 ft)

Population (2017)
  - Total: 3,340
- Time zone: -4 Gmt
- Climate: Cfa

Teniente Esteban Martínez is a district and locality in the Presidente Hayes Department of Paraguay. It is located 300 km from Asunción and has a population of 3340 inhabitants. It was established as a category by means of law 3000/06. On December 30, 2021, a maximum temperature of 45.3 °C (113.5 °F) was registered and on January 26, 2022, a maximum temperature of 45.7 °C (114.3 °F) was registered, the latest is the highest in meteorological history of Paraguay.
