= San Estanislao =

- City and district
- San Estanislao de Kostka
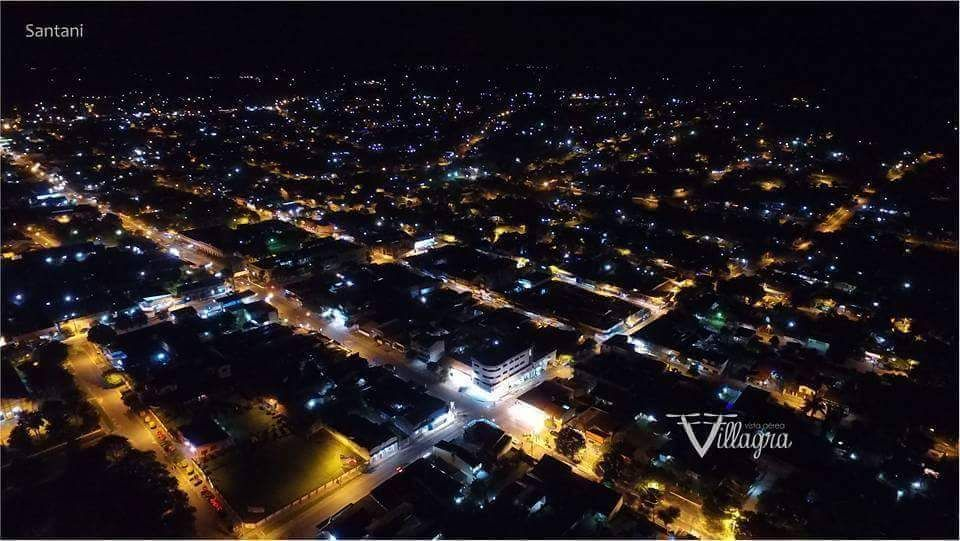
- Night view of San Estanislao

- Flag Coat of arms
- Nickname: Santaní
- Location in Paraguay
- Coordinates: 24°39′0″S 56°26′0″W
- Country: Paraguay
- Department: San Pedro
- Founded: November 13, 1749 by the Jesuit Sebastián Yegros
- Named for: Stanislaus Kostka

Government
  - Intendente Municipal: Andrés Rafael Jara Melo

Area
  - Total: 2,625 km^{2} (1,014 sq mi)
- Elevation: 134 m (440 ft)

Population (2008)
  - Total: 52,983
  - Density: 20.18/km^{2} (52.3/sq mi)
- Time zone: -4 Gmt
- Postal code: 8210
- Area code: (595) (43)

San Estanislao de Kostka, usually referred to as San Estanislao and colloquially as Santaní, is a city and district in the department of San Pedro, Paraguay.

== History ==
San Estanislao was founded on November 13, 1749 by Father Sebastián de Yegros, a Jesuit priest from Asunción after Saint Stanislaus Kostka, a Polish priest who was canonized by Pope Benedict XIII 23 years before. The town was founded as a Jesuit mission with the goal of converting the surrounding native population.

Santaní, as the city is commonly referred to locally and throughout Paraguay, is a contraction of the word for 'saint' in Spanish (san) and the word for 'Stanislaus' in Guaraní (taní). People from Santaní are referred to as santanianos in Spanish.

In 1869, during the Paraguayan War, San Estanislao was briefly the seat of the national government under Marshal Francisco Solano López. Following battles elsewhere in Paraguay, López and several of his regiments passed through the city. López governed from the city from August 23 to 31.

=== Immigration to San Estanislao ===
Around 1880, San Estanislao became home to immigrants from both other parts of Paraguay and from Europe, especially Germany and Italy. The influence of the Italian immigrants, in particular, can still be seen today in various buildings in Italian styles and the last names of some of the oldest Santaniana families.

Decades later, around 1920, Santaní also received immigrants from Lebanon. After arriving at Itacurubí del Rosario, some of the new arrivals made their way to Santaní. Other countries that sent relatively large numbers of immigrants to the city include France, Portugal, Brazil and Spain.

== Climate ==
Caazapá has a humid subtropical climate (Köppen: Cfa), close to a tropical monsoon climate (Köppen: Am) with hot summers and warm winters.

Climate data for San Estanislao (1991–2020)
Month	Jan	Feb	Mar	Apr	May	Jun	Jul	Aug	Sep	Oct	Nov	Dec	Year
Record high °C (°F)	42.4 (108.3)	39.6 (103.3)	41.0 (105.8)	38.0 (100.4)	35.2 (95.4)	34.0 (93.2)	34.4 (93.9)	38.4 (101.1)	40.8 (105.4)	42.2 (108.0)	41.2 (106.2)	39.0 (102.2)	42.4 (108.3)
Mean daily maximum °C (°F)	32.2 (90.0)	31.8 (89.2)	31.3 (88.3)	29.2 (84.6)	25.2 (77.4)	24.1 (75.4)	24.4 (75.9)	26.9 (80.4)	28.2 (82.8)	29.8 (85.6)	30.7 (87.3)	31.5 (88.7)	28.8 (83.8)
Daily mean °C (°F)	27.4 (81.3)	26.8 (80.2)	26.0 (78.8)	23.4 (74.1)	19.5 (67.1)	18.5 (65.3)	17.7 (63.9)	19.7 (67.5)	21.7 (71.1)	24.3 (75.7)	25.4 (77.7)	26.9 (80.4)	23.1 (73.6)
Mean daily minimum °C (°F)	22.1 (71.8)	21.5 (70.7)	20.5 (68.9)	18.2 (64.8)	14.7 (58.5)	13.8 (56.8)	12.6 (54.7)	14.2 (57.6)	16.2 (61.2)	19.1 (66.4)	19.8 (67.6)	21.4 (70.5)	17.8 (64.0)
Record low °C (°F)	14.6 (58.3)	10.6 (51.1)	8.4 (47.1)	5.0 (41.0)	1.2 (34.2)	−0.8 (30.6)	−1.2 (29.8)	0.0 (32.0)	0.0 (32.0)	6.4 (43.5)	7.0 (44.6)	9.8 (49.6)	−1.2 (29.8)
Average precipitation mm (inches)	133.4 (5.25)	171.0 (6.73)	123.3 (4.85)	163.3 (6.43)	183.4 (7.22)	105.3 (4.15)	64.0 (2.52)	52.7 (2.07)	117.3 (4.62)	189.6 (7.46)	182.8 (7.20)	173.1 (6.81)	1,659.1 (65.32)
Source: NOAA

== Economy ==
After 1870, during the postwar period, Santaní and the surrounding countryside were sustained mostly through agriculture and forestry. Tobacco was the major crop, and its production and packaging for export were a main contributor of jobs.

Today the primary economic activity continues to be agriculture, especially cotton, mandioca, soy and sesame. Beef and milk production, forestry, commerce, and regional services (medical treatment, banking, and construction) also contribute to the city's economy.

== Education ==
San Estanislao is home to schools ranging from primary- to university-level, both public and private.

In 1994 a College of Economic Sciences was established in the city as part of the UNA. There are more than 10 universities in downtown Santani.

== Transportation ==
Travel time between San Estanislao and Asunción (151 km away) was greatly reduced with the inauguration of Route 3 in May 2004. Buses leave the terminal to Asuncion every half an hour.
