= Paraíso =

Paraíso (Galician, Portuguese, Spanish) means paradise in English. It may refer to:

== Places ==
=== Central America ===
- Paraiso, Belize, a municipality in Belize
- Paraíso, Costa Rica
  - Paraíso (canton), in Cartago province
- Paraíso, Barahona, Dominican Republic
- Paraíso, Distrito Nacional, Dominican Republic
- Paraíso, Tabasco, Tabasco, Mexico
- Paraíso, Panamá Province, Panama
- Paraíso, Chiriquí, Panama
- Paraíso, Los Santos, Panama
- Paraíso metro station, a rapid transit station in Panama City

=== South America ===
- Paraíso, Santa Catarina, Brazil
- Paraíso, São Paulo, Brazil
  - Paraíso (São Paulo Metro)
- Paraíso do Tocantins, a municipality in the state of Tocantins in the Northern region of Brazil
- El Paraíso, Peru, settlement in the Chillón Valley occupied ca. 3500-1800 BC.

== Television ==
- Paraíso (Venezuelan TV series), a 1989 Venezuelan telenovela
- Paraíso (2009 TV series), a 2009 Brazilian telenovela
- Paraiso (Philippine TV series), a 2012 Philippine daytime television drama
- Paraíso (2021 TV series), a Spanish television series that ran from 2021 to 2022

== Cinema ==
- Paraíso (1970 film), a 1970 film by Luis Alcoriza
- Paraíso (2003 film), a 2003 film by Alina Teodorescu
- Paraiso, a 2009 film by Leon Ichaso
- Paraiso (2015 film), a Philippine documentary film
- Paraíso (documentary film), a 2025 documentary film by Daniel Mota

== Music ==
- Paraiso (Haruomi Hosono album), a 1978 album by Haruomi Hosono
- Paraiso (Smokey Mountain album), a 1991 album by the band Smoky Mountain
- Paraiso, a 2013 album by the band Subsignal
- "Paraíso", a song by Bloc Party on the 2016 album Hymns
- "Paraíso," a 2018 song by Lucas Lucco and Pabllo Vittar

== Other uses ==
- Paraiso, a story arc of the Philippine comic strip series Pugad Baboy
- Bala de Cañón (Couroupita nicaraguensis), a species of woody plant also known as paraíso
