= El Paraíso Verde =

Paraguayan planned community

Coordinates: 26.2991°S 56.3583°W

El Paraíso Verde (Spanish for The Green Paradise) is a gated community in the Caazapá Department of Paraguay. It was founded by Erwin Annau and his wife Sylvia, who are both from Austria. As of March 2022, its population is about 250, mostly German language-speaking immigrants from Germany and Austria, with some Americans and Canadians present. The community is planned as a settlement for 6,000 people and may expand to more than 20,000 people, according to its marketing materials. The community bills itself as a refuge from socialism, 5G, chemtrails, fluoridated water, and mandatory vaccinations.

The settlement occupies 500 hectares (1,200 acres) of a total landholding of 1,600 hectares (4,000 acres) about 20 kilometres (12 mi) south of the city of Caazapá, near the Pirapó River and the Caapibary River. It is about 210 kilometres (130 mi) from Paraguay's capital of Asunción.

== History ==
Annau had attracted attention in 2017 for giving a speech to members of Paraguay's government in which he condemned Islam and its presence in Germany. He told those present that the Quran contains "an ideology of political domination, which is not compatible with democratic and Christian values." The Spanish newspaper El País described El Paraíso Verde as one of several closed South American colonies established by Europeans who feel threatened by Islam in Europe.

The colony markets itself to German-speaking people who are skeptical about the COVID-19 pandemic and about the vaccine mandates required as a result of it. Marketing materials claimed that Paraguay has no pandemic-related restrictions, although those have since been enacted. Paraguay requires vaccination proof for immigrants as of January 2022, and several German immigrants have been denied entry without it. The community shared videos of large gatherings in June 2021 that violated Paraguay's COVID-19 protocols. El Paraíso Verde is billed as a private colony and rejects characterizations of it as a "cult". Marketing materials make reference to "the Matrix," as described in the film of the same name, as a construct that residents can escape by moving in. The colony does not charge taxes to its residents, although Paraguayan authorities may impose them.

British newspaper The Guardian reports that the colony owns Reljuv S.A., the company that manages the "El Paraíso Verde" real estate project, and in January 2022 had been increasing its economic and political power.

El Paraíso Verde has attracted criticism from Abdun Nur Baten, missionary for the Ahmadiyya Muslim Community of Paraguay, who accused Erwin Annau of hypocrisy for denouncing immigrants' refusal to assimilate in German-speaking countries and then establishing an immigrant colony in a foreign country himself. In addition, the high level of COVID skepticism in El Paraíso Verde has concerned local health authorities. Caazapá's head of public health noted that her department is ill-prepared for a COVID-19 outbreak, as it has no intensive care unit beds and only one ambulance.

In 2023, the president of Reljuv, Juan Joaquín Buker, was dismissed from his office because of charges of fraud and misappropriation of funds. As of October 29, 2023, three lawyers have ten civil complaints against Reljuv, with total claimed damages of 21.68 billion Paraguayan guaraní (about US$2.9 million). Reljuv's lawyer denied allegations of fraud and told a news reporter that the complainants are few in number, compared with the more than 500 families who have made investments in El Paraíso Verde. In April 2024, the Annaus sued Buker and six other Reljuv employees for damages related to a 15 billion guaraní irregularity on Reljuv's balance sheet. Buker had been placed under house arrest between November 2023 and April 2024. On his radio program, Buker described the Annaus' lawsuit as an attempt to deflect from the couple's responsibility.

In July 2026, a criminal court in Villarrica, Guaira Department, ordered the arrest of Sylvia and Erwin Annau. They had failed to appear for a hearing regarding one of the numerous fraud charges and had not provided a reason of their absence. It's speculated that the Annaus might have fled Paraguay.

== See also ==
- Nueva Germania, another Paraguayan settlement founded by German-speaking emigrants
- Germans in Paraguay

== Publications ==
- Pereyra, C. (2022). Nationalism Online: The Case of 'El Paraiso Verde', a Gated Community for Germans in Paraguay. interculture journal: Online-Zeitschrift für interkulturelle Studien, 21(36), 151-168. https://nbn-resolving.org/ urn:nbn:de:0168-ssoar-80125-4
