= Unión, Paraguay =

Unión
- Town
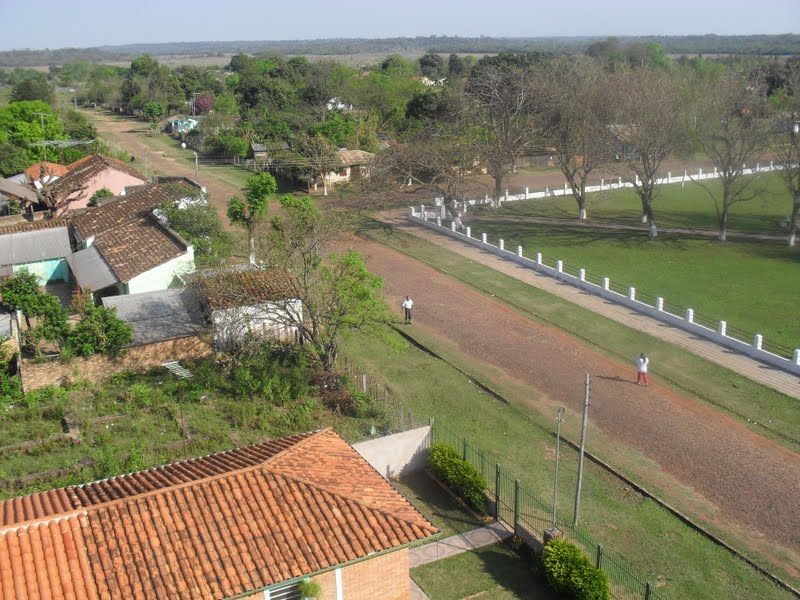
- Unión, viewed from the water tower

- Location within Paraguay
- Coordinates: 24°48′0″S 56°33′0″W
- Country: Paraguay
- Department: San Pedro

Area
  - Town: 3.34 km^{2} (1.29 sq mi)
  - Urban: 2.19 km^{2} (0.85 sq mi)
- Elevation: 118 m (387 ft)

Population (2008)
  - Town: 1 810
- Time zone: UTC-4
  - Summer (DST): UTC-3

Unión is a town and district in the San Pedro Department, Paraguay.

== Sources ==
- World Gazeteer: Paraguay – World-Gazetteer.com _{Broken link.}
