= Veinticinco de Diciembre =

Veinticinco de Diciembre "El Portal del Norte"
- City
- Location within Paraguay
- Coordinates: 24°42′S 56°33′W
- Country: Paraguay
- Department: San Pedro
- Established: September 7, 1973

Government
  - Alcalde: Carlos Álvarez Speranza

Area
  - Total: 995 km^{2} (384 sq mi)
- Elevation: 116 m (381 ft)

Population (2008)
  - Total: 9,147
  - Density: 119/km^{2} (310/sq mi)
- Time zone: Asunción Paraguay
  - Summer (DST): -4 Gmt

Veinticinco de Diciembre is a city in the San Pedro department of Paraguay. This city is located 120 km. north of the city of Asunción, with which it communicates through the National Route 3, which crosses its territory from east to west.

The district adopted the name of a memorable date in the history of the Republic of Paraguay, because the December 25, 1842 was proclaimed the Declaration of National Independence in the city of Nuestra Señora de la Asunción, the capital city of Paraguay. Confirmed the cry of liberty proclaimed in the early morning of May 15, 1811.

It is a diverse area of economic activity but dominated agriculture and livestock. In the city, there are about 700 people (according to the Municipal Government Program Open for 2007) and in general the district is populated by 9147 inhabitants, distributed in 11 neighborhoods surrounding the town. No record level of extreme poverty.

25 de Diciembre takes the slogan "The Portal of the North", for the simple reason that it is the first city in which you enter to access the rest of North Eastern Region, on the route III.

The district's rapid growth is due precisely to the pavement, this important communication route that connects the capital city and the rest of the country.

== History ==
25 de Diciembre, was initially covered by an immense forest surrounded by extensive fields and wetlands, populated only by tribes of bias Ava Guarani, whose relics are in the San Juan Bosco (Mbopi) and Santa Rosa, respectively. Remains as a large quantity of pottery and jars with human bones. Many of which are visible today in the Museo del Barro in Asuncion.

In fact, the location of the city, originally was not emerge in the place where today the village center. Well, the first residents settled in the forests of Isla Guasu, in the western district, known as San Antonio. In addition to the cattle ranches in the northern region it shares with San Estanislao.

The people were rather pioneers of the field workers, ranchers and immigrants from different parts of Paraguay. Even foreigners who fled their country during the First and II World War. Thus, in the district were installed settlers from Germany, Turkey and Spain, respectively.

It was thought to turn to the district headquarters in the Potrero Yvate executive or county to administer the district due to its strategic location, then Mboi'y so on, but eventually settled in what is now present. Mboi'y and Potrero Yvate population centers are more developed, as have all the necessary services and its people are very organized.

Veinticinco de Diciembre and was a dependent colony of San Estanislao, which was set up as an independent municipality. Even teachers who taught at the school in San Antonio taught with items from Juan de Mena, the department of Cordillera.

Law 396 of September 7, 1973 rose to the rank of the Cologne District 25 de Diciembre removed from the District of San Estanislao and created a third category of municipality. Articles 3, p.55-56.

== Sources ==
- World Gazeteer: Paraguay – World-Gazetteer.com
