= Jejuí Guazú River =

River in Paraguay

- Jejuí Guazú River (Paraguay)
- Native name: Rio Jejuí Guazú (Portuguese)

Location
- Country: Paraguay

Physical characteristics
- Mouth
  - coordinates: 24.176111°S 57.242778°W

Basin features
- River system: Paraguay River

The Jejuí Guazú River (Spanish: Rio Jejuí Guazú) is a river in northeast Paraguay. It is a tributary of the Paraguay River.

== Course ==
The Jejuí Guazú River flows from the Canindeyú Department, crosses the San Pedro Department just south of the department capital of San Pedro de Ycuamandiyú to join the Paraguay River.

The upper basin of the Jejuí River is protected by the Mbaracayú Forest Nature Reserve.

== See also ==
- List of rivers of Paraguay
