= Pozo Colorado =

- Location within Paraguay
- Coordinates: 23°25′48″S 58°51′36″W
- Country: Paraguay
- Department: Presidente Hayes

Population (2008)
  - Total: 2,135
- Climate: Cfa

Pozo Colorado is a town in Paraguay, located in the department of Presidente Hayes. First references for the place comes from the late 1890s. It was originally an Enxet village yexwase’ yamelkyet. Pozo Colorado is the Spanish translation for Red Well. After the Chaco War, it became primarily a military base, surrounded by ranches whose owners lived mainly in Asunción. As the Ruta Transchaco cut across the Chacoan plain, entrepreneurs arrived creating a small civilian enclave setting up small businesses. It is now quite a thriving small town or village with more petrol stations than any other small town of Paraguay. Besides the military presence, the police are also there, as well as other government offices that have to do with cattle sanitation and husbandry.

== Geography ==
Temperatures range between 0 Celsius in winter to 44 in the Summer. It is practically on the border of the swamps and wetlands of the Bajo Chaco. Typical of the area are the large clumps and even small forests of palm trees Copernicia alba and various types of algarrobos (Prosopis).

Climate data for Pozo Colorado (1991–2020)
Month	Jan	Feb	Mar	Apr	May	Jun	Jul	Aug	Sep	Oct	Nov	Dec	Year
Mean daily maximum °C (°F)	35.2 (95.4)	34.0 (93.2)	32.9 (91.2)	30.5 (86.9)	26.3 (79.3)	25.1 (77.2)	25.4 (77.7)	28.4 (83.1)	30.8 (87.4)	32.9 (91.2)	33.1 (91.6)	34.2 (93.6)	30.7 (87.3)
Daily mean °C (°F)	28.5 (83.3)	27.5 (81.5)	26.4 (79.5)	23.9 (75.0)	20.1 (68.2)	18.8 (65.8)	17.9 (64.2)	20.1 (68.2)	22.7 (72.9)	25.5 (77.9)	26.1 (79.0)	27.6 (81.7)	23.8 (74.8)
Mean daily minimum °C (°F)	23.0 (73.4)	22.5 (72.5)	21.3 (70.3)	18.9 (66.0)	15.2 (59.4)	13.9 (57.0)	12.2 (54.0)	13.7 (56.7)	16.2 (61.2)	19.7 (67.5)	20.4 (68.7)	22.2 (72.0)	18.3 (64.9)
Average precipitation mm (inches)	124.5 (4.90)	125.8 (4.95)	128.2 (5.05)	104.6 (4.12)	94.7 (3.73)	36.5 (1.44)	25.1 (0.99)	18.0 (0.71)	38.5 (1.52)	94.6 (3.72)	158.5 (6.24)	140.5 (5.53)	1,089.3 (42.89)
Source: NOAA

== Sources ==
- World Gazeteer: Paraguay – World-Gazetteer.com
