= San Pedro de Ycuamandiyú =

San Pedro de Ycuamandyyú Ykuamandyju (Guarani)
- City and district
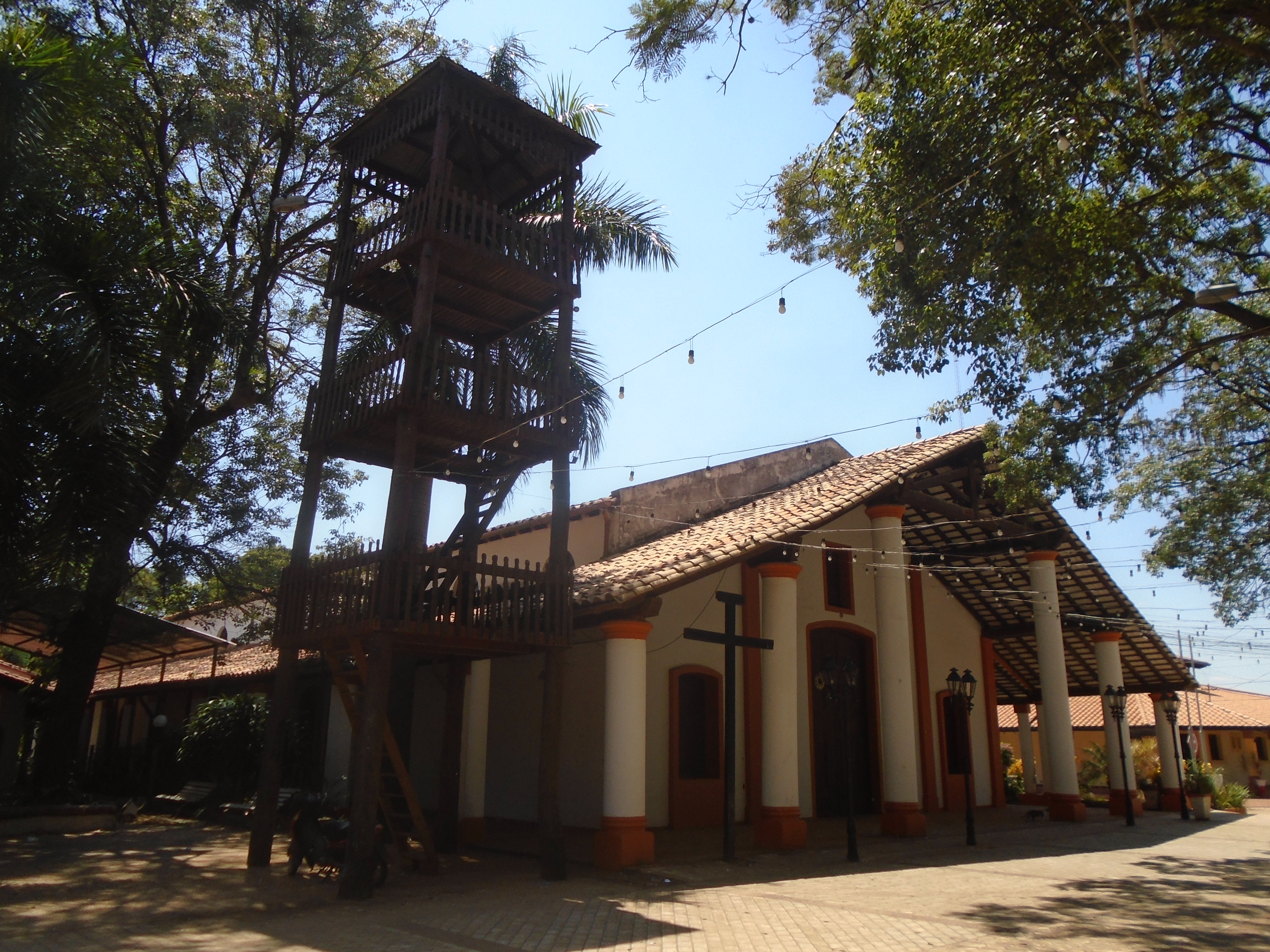

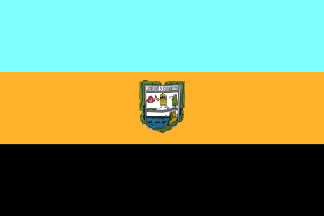
- Flag

- Location within Paraguay
- Coordinates: 24°6′S 57°5′W
- Country: Paraguay
- Department: San Pedro
- Founded: 16 March 1786 by Commander José Ferreira and Captain Pedro García

Government
  - Intendente municipal: Carlos Alberto Quiñónez(ANR)

Area
  - Total: 3,185 km^{2} (1,230 sq mi)
- Elevation: 64 m (210 ft)

Population (2008)
  - Total: 32,918
  - Density: 9/km^{2} (23/sq mi)
- Time zone: -4 Gmt
- Postal code: 8000
- Area code: (595) (342)

San Pedro de Ycuamandyyú (Spanish pronunciation: [ˈsam ˈpeðɾo ðejkwamandiˈʝu]; Guarani: Ykuamandyju) is a city and district in Paraguay. It is the capital of the department of San Pedro.

The conquistador Aleixo Garcia, the first European to cross Paraguay and reach the Inca empire in 1524, is believed to have been killed near San Pedro on his return.

== Etymology ==
Originally the name was "Villa de San Pedro Apóstol de ykuaminday", San Pedro's village from the water source of the cotton field, is the translation of the words in Guaraní Language "ykua" water source and "mandyju" cotton, there was a cotton plant in a well. Mr. Pedro García Lacoizqueta was sent by Governor Pedro Melo de Portugal to establish a small village in that place.

== Geography ==
Route XI "Juana de Lara" links the city to Route III "Elizardo Aquino" to the east. It is 25 km (16 mi) far from Paraguay River, 15 km (9 mi) from Antequera district and 3 km (2 mi) from Jejui River.

=== Weather ===
The weather is humid and rainy, humidity ranges from 70 to 80%. The average temperature 23 °C, the maximum in summer is 35 °C and the minimum 10 °C.

Climate data for San Pedro de Ycuamandiyú (1991–2020)
Month	Jan	Feb	Mar	Apr	May	Jun	Jul	Aug	Sep	Oct	Nov	Dec	Year
Mean daily maximum °C (°F)	34.2 (93.6)	33.2 (91.8)	31.9 (89.4)	29.0 (84.2)	24.9 (76.8)	23.5 (74.3)	23.8 (74.8)	26.7 (80.1)	28.7 (83.7)	31.0 (87.8)	31.8 (89.2)	33.3 (91.9)	29.3 (84.7)
Daily mean °C (°F)	27.2 (81.0)	26.7 (80.1)	25.5 (77.9)	23.2 (73.8)	19.5 (67.1)	18.5 (65.3)	17.5 (63.5)	19.5 (67.1)	21.4 (70.5)	24.2 (75.6)	25.0 (77.0)	26.7 (80.1)	22.9 (73.2)
Mean daily minimum °C (°F)	22.7 (72.9)	22.3 (72.1)	21.1 (70.0)	18.7 (65.7)	15.3 (59.5)	14.2 (57.6)	12.7 (54.9)	14.1 (57.4)	16.2 (61.2)	19.5 (67.1)	20.1 (68.2)	21.9 (71.4)	18.2 (64.8)
Average precipitation mm (inches)	139.7 (5.50)	179.4 (7.06)	100.3 (3.95)	153.1 (6.03)	140.2 (5.52)	81.6 (3.21)	58.5 (2.30)	39.2 (1.54)	88.3 (3.48)	164.5 (6.48)	187.9 (7.40)	161.9 (6.37)	1,494.6 (58.84)
Source: NOAA

== Demography ==
San Pedro's population is 29,097 inhabitants, 15,043 are men and 14,054 women. In the urban area 7,927 people and the rural area, 21,170 people.

== History ==
In 1525, native people might have killed the Portuguese Alejo García, who was the first European to explore Paraguay by walking the whole Chaco Paraguayo. He also went through the Tapé Avirú.

San Pedro was founded on 16 March 1786 by Commander José Ferreira and Captain Pedro García.

== Economy ==
The city economy is based mainly on cattle rising. Farming includes yerba mate, cotton, soy, bean, potato, alfalfa, citrus fruits, maní, manioc and wheat. Industries like wood, oil and petit grain. Craftmanship like embroidering ao poi and handed-works on clay.

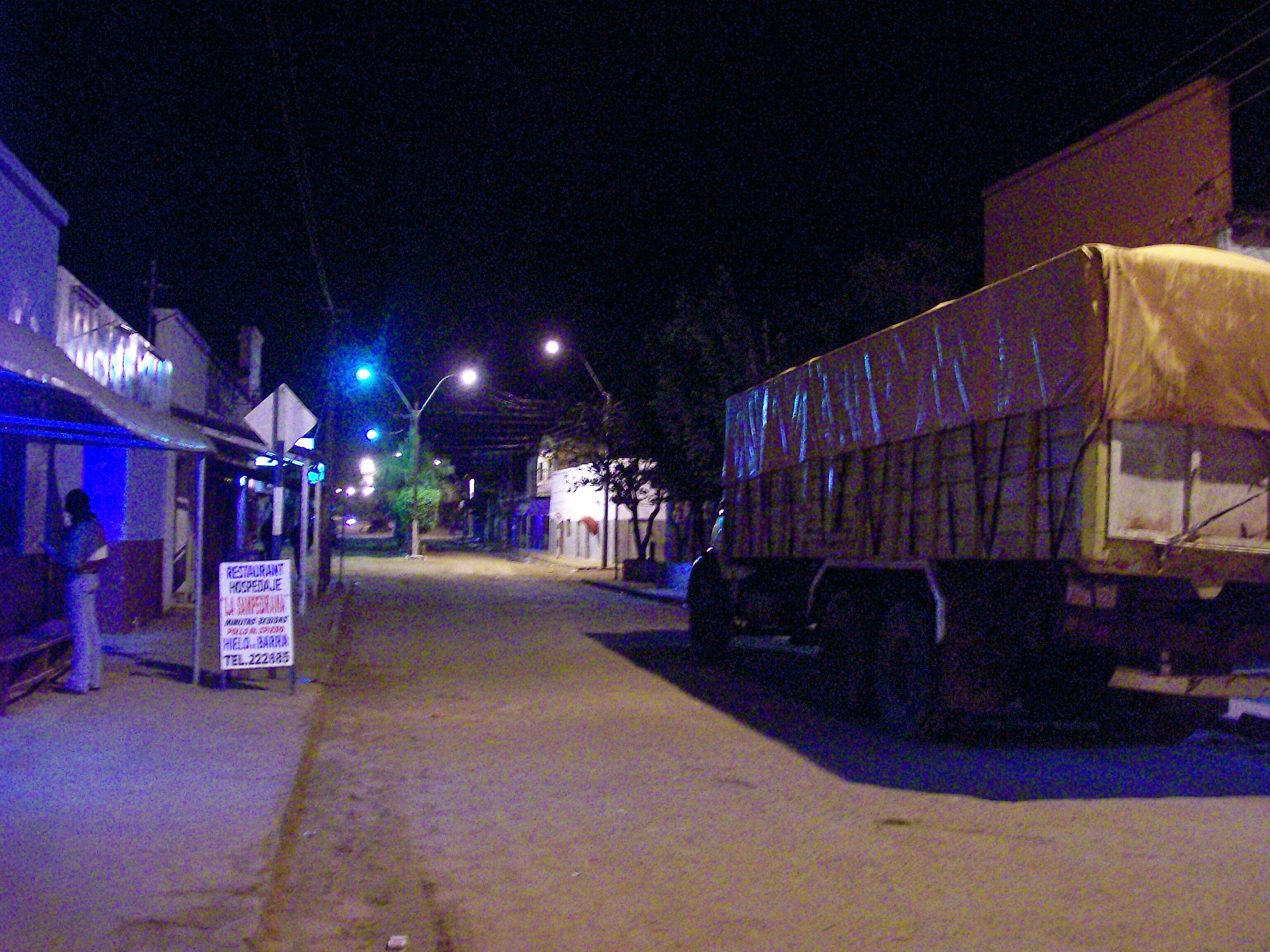
San Pedro at night

== Tourism ==
San Pedro is called the "Capital of Cordiality". The city has colorful houses from the colonial period.

The church was built during Don Carlos Antonio López government and rebuilt with all the characteristics of that period. The altarpiece and the images are invaluable parts of the Paraguayan History. Some important historical elements of the region can be seen at Mr. Francisco Resquin's museum.

Casa de la Cultura is another interesting place because artists present their works there, poems, guitar and music courses are held in this house. Jejui River offers its shores and beach for people where they can go camping.

== Bibliography and references ==
- Geografía Ilustrada del Paraguay, Distribuidora Arami SRL; 2007. ISBN 99925-68-04-6
- Geografía del Paraguay, Primera Edición 1999, Editorial Hispana Paraguay SRL,
