= Antequera District =

Antequera
- District
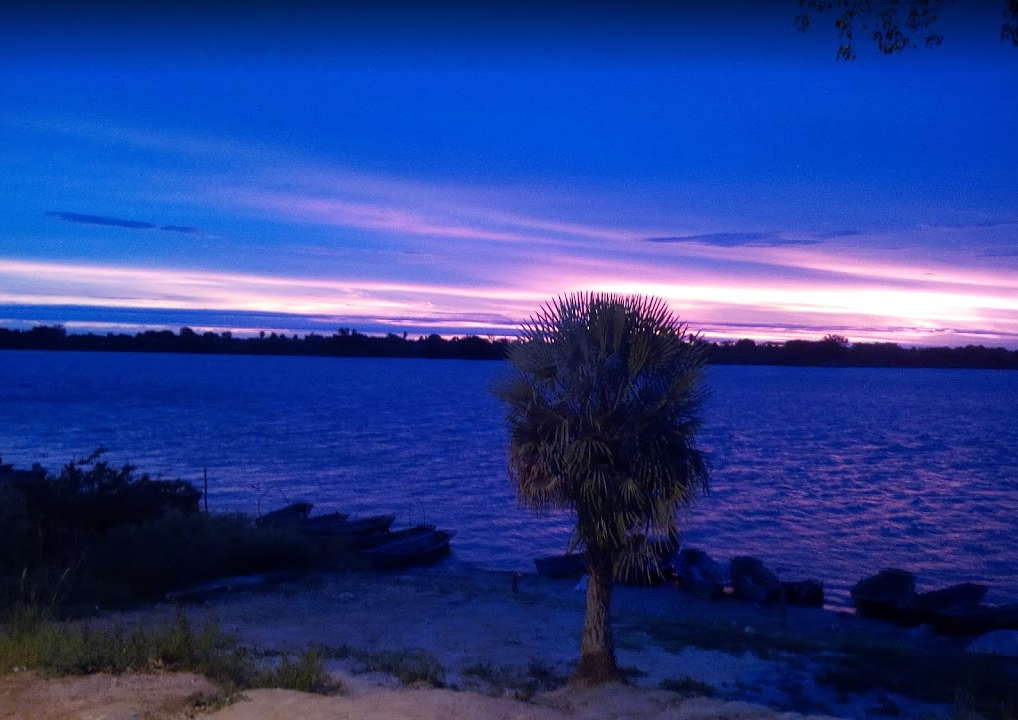
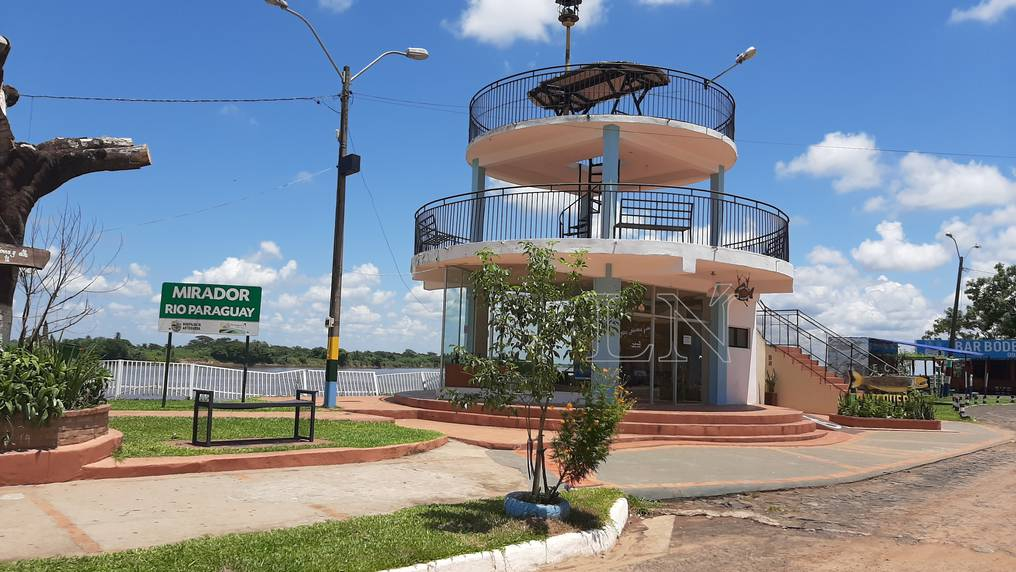
- From top: a view of the sunset over the Paraguay River and the watchtower in Antequera.

- Location within Paraguay
- Named for: José de Antequera y Castro

Government
  - Mayor: Julio César Alfonzo Fisher (ANR)

Area
  - Total: 1,492 km^{2} (576 sq mi)
- Elevation: 64 m (210 ft)

Population
  - 2023 estimate: 4,352
  - Density: 2.82/km^{2} (7.3/sq mi)
- Time zone: UTC-4
- Calling code: 451
- Website: https://www.municipios.gov.py/antequera/

Antequera is an industrial district of the San Pedro, Paraguay. It is known for having several silos and ports from where the grain stored in them is exported.

== Etymology ==
The district was named after José de Antequera y Castro, a Spanish criollo who mediated the conflicts between criollos and governor Diego de los Reyes Balmaceda. The place where he first arrived on his vessel was which would later become the Antequera district. A monument was lifted by the riverside in his honor.

== History ==
It was founded in 1892 by brothers Juan Alberto López and José Visitación López as a small settlement. In 1955, the place was promoted to district status.

== Geography ==
The twin lakes Verá and Brillante (both meaning "bright" in Guarani and Spanish, respectively) are big touristic attractions close to each other. They are thought to have been originated from a meteor shower thousands of years ago.

== Culture ==
The district's patronal festival is the Feast of the Cross on May 3 in honor of a cross erected to remember a woman named Francisca who, during the Paraguayan War, was about to give birth on a boat, but the marines abandoned her, throwing her to the river where she and her unborn child died. The cross became known as Kurusu Chika, meaning "the cross of Chika" (Guaraní version of the name Francisca).

After some time, locals attributed miracles to Francisca and adopted the Cross as protection for the district.

On the feast, several cultural activities are organized and attended by thousands of people. Examples include student parades, music festivals, nautical processions, ballet performances, stand-up comedy as religious celebrations and dramatic recreations of the day Francisca died.

During the rest of the year, the main touristic activity is fishing due to its location next to the river and the fish quality.
