= Itacurubí del Rosario =

- Location within Paraguay
- Coordinates: 24°30′0″S 56°40′48″W
- Country: Paraguay
- Department: San Pedro

Population (2008)
  - Total: 4 183

Itacurubí del Rosario is a town in the San Pedro department of Paraguay.

== Sources ==
- World Gazeteer: Paraguay – World-Gazetteer.com
