= San Pedro Department, Paraguay =

Department of Paraguay

Coordinates: 24.1000°S 57.0833°W

San Pedro Department Departamento de San Pedro (Spanish) Tetãvore San Pedro (Guarani)
- Department
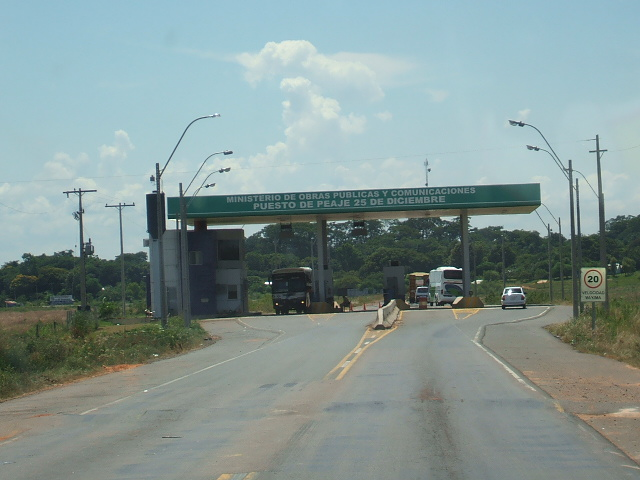
- A toll in Veinticinco de Diciembre, by the entrance of San Pedro

- Flag

- Country: Paraguay
- Capital: San Pedro de Ycuamandiyú

Government
  - Governor: Freddy D'Ecclesiis (ANR)

Area
  - Total: 20,002 km^{2} (7,723 sq mi)

Population (2022 census)
  - Total: 355,175
  - Density: 17.757/km^{2} (45.990/sq mi)
- Time zone: UTC-04 (AST)
  - Summer (DST): UTC-03 (ADT)
- Number of Districts: 17

San Pedro (Spanish pronunciation: [ˈsam‿ˈpe.ðɾo]) is a department of Paraguay. The capital is the city of San Pedro de Ycuamandiyú.

== History ==
During the 17th and 18th centuries there was even greater political and population instability than in Concepción.

The Mbayá and Payagua native tribes threatened all the area between the Ypané (in the north) and Manduvirá (in the south) Rivers and the valley by the Jejuí River.

In 1660 the natives revolted in Arecajá against the postal parcel system, causing the disappearance of this town. To help regenerate this area, the Missions San Estanislao (1749), Villa del Rosario (1786) and San Pedro de Ycuamandiyú (1786) were founded.

The second department of the country, San Pedro, was created by law in 1906, and included the territories of Itacurubí del Rosario, Santa Rosa del Aguaray, Tacuatí, Unión, Ygatimi and Curuguaty, as well as the area of Canindeyú. Its limits were defined finally in 1973.

In 1941, the Bruderhof, an Anabaptist group fleeing Nazi persecution, settled in the area of Rosario. They lived here for over 20 years, founding a hospital. They left for North America in 1966.

Is hometown of important personalities of Paraguayan history, as Vicente Ignacio Iturbe and Juana María de Lara and the musician Rosita Mello, who is from Santaní.

== Geography ==
=== Limits ===
It is located in the center of the Oriental Region, between the parallels 22º00’ and 23º30’ of latitude South and the meridians 58º00’ and 56º06’ of longitude West.

Its limits are:

- To the North: the Ypané River, which separates San Pedro from Concepción.
- To the South: the Manduvirá River and Hondo Stream, which separates it from Cordillera; also the San Joaquín Cordillera, which separates it from Caaguazú.
- To the East: the Aguaray River, the limit with Amambay, and the rivers Jejuí Guazú, Curuguaty and Corrientes, which separates San Pedro from Canindeyú.
- To the West: the Paraguay River, natural limit with Presidente Hayes.

It is the biggest department of the Oriental Region, and is mostly dedicated to agriculture, cattle and forestry.

=== Districts ===
The department is divided in 20 districts:

1. Antequera
2. Capiibary
3. Choré
4. General Aquino
5. General Resquín
6. Guayaibí
7. Itacurubí del Rosario
8. Liberación
9. Lima
10. Nueva Germania
11. San Estanislao
12. San Pablo
13. San Pedro
14. Santa Rosa
15. Tacuatí
16. Unión
17. 25 de Diciembre
18. Villa del Rosario
19. Yataity
20. Yrybucuá
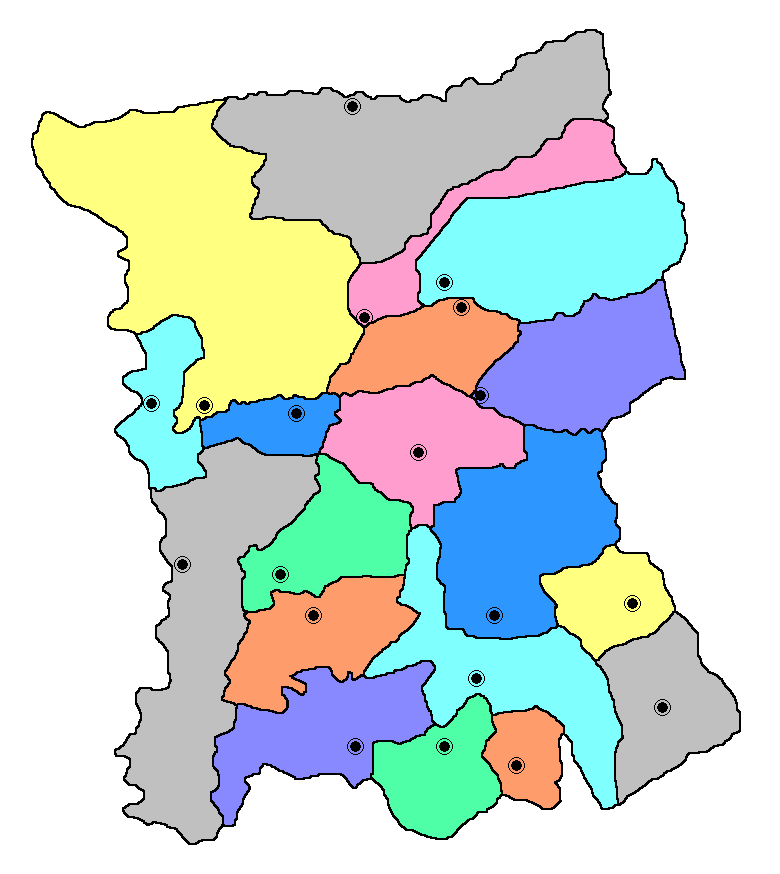

=== Climate ===
The climate is humid and rainy. The average temperature is 23 °C, the minimum in winter is 10 °C and the maximum in summer is 38 °C. The humidity is 70 to 80%, and the precipitation can reach 1,324 mm.

=== Orography and soil ===
The soil in San Pedro is sedimentary in the north, and with swamps, lagoons and valleys in the south.

In the San Joaquín Mountains, natural limit with Caaguazú, the hills: Curuzú, Corazón, Aguaray, Noviretá, Guaviray and San Miguel outstand among others. The hill Cerro Dos de Oro, in Capiibary, is also an important landmark

Half the territory of the department is apt for agriculture and cattle.

=== Hydrography ===
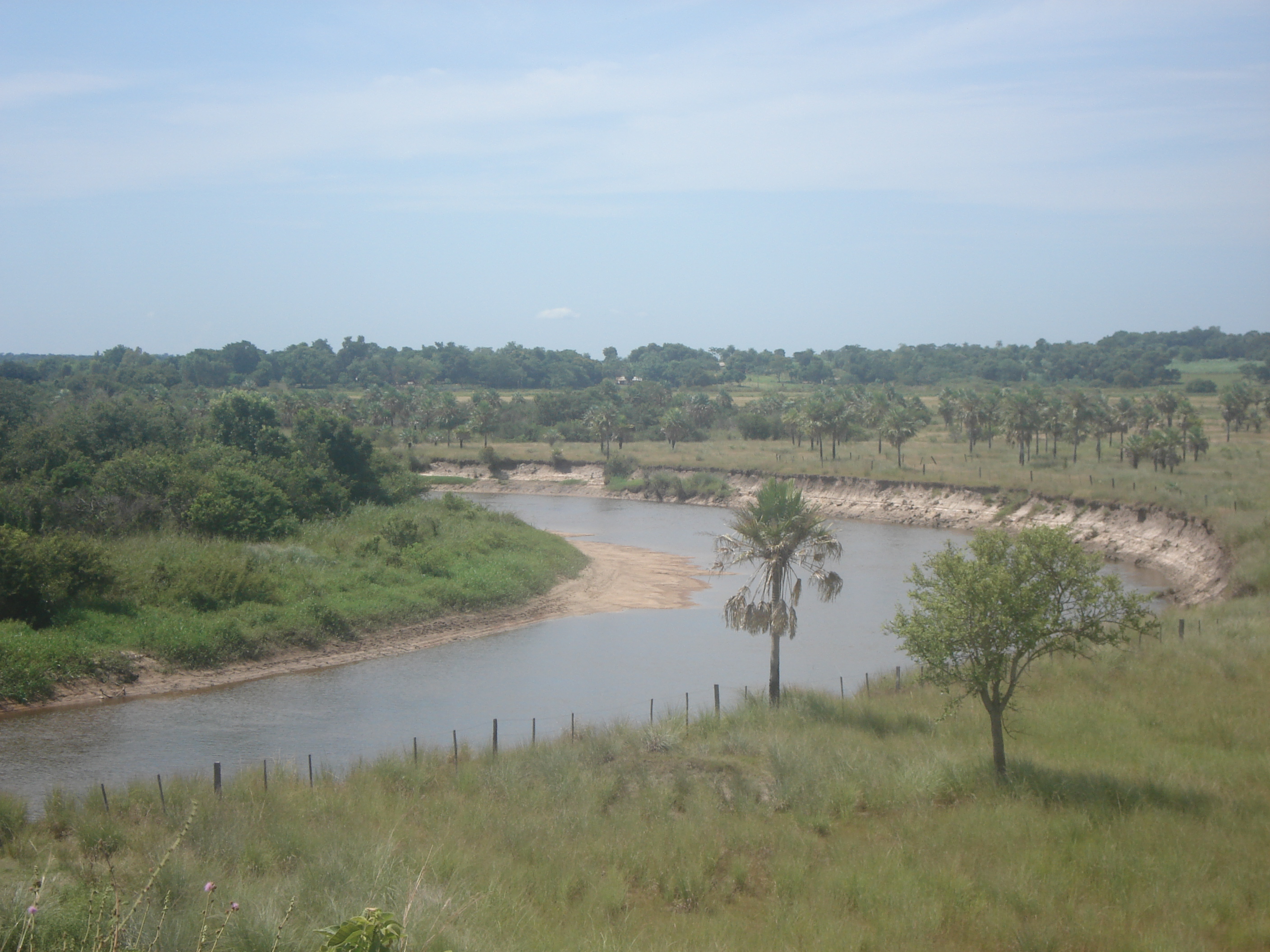
Yhaguy river

The west side of the territory is nurtured by the Paraguay River.

The rivers: Ypané, Jejuí Guazú, Aguaraymi, Aguaray Guazú, Maduvirá and Tacuatí cross the entire department.

The Corrientes River is by the east of the department.

In San Pedro the swamps are abundant: Piripucú, San Antonio, Yetyty, Tapiracuai, Peguahó, Mbutuy, Tobatiry and Aguaraymi. There are also the lagoons Vera and Blanca.

The most important ports are: Milagro, Colorado, Santa Rosa, Tacurú Pytá, Uno, Laurel, Jejuí, Mbopicuá, Santa Elena and Uruguaitá.

=== Nature and Vegetation ===
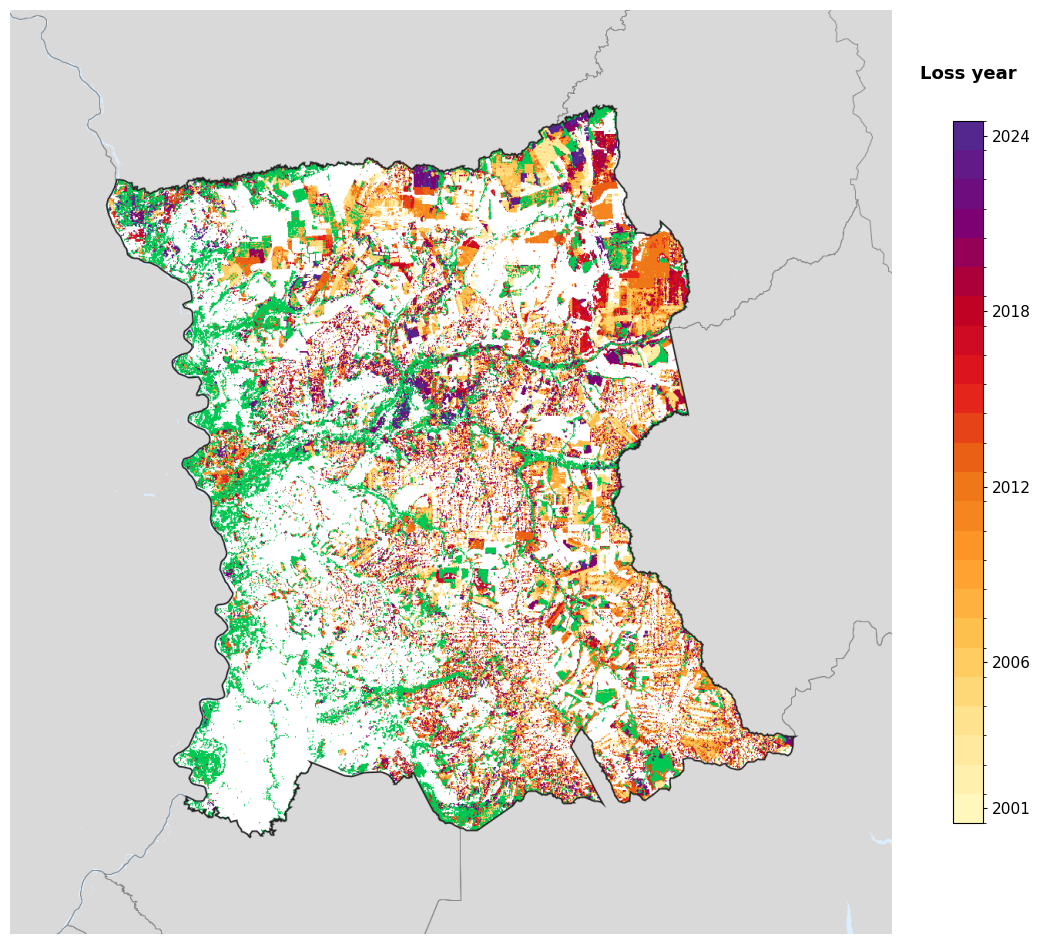
Tree-cover loss year in San Pedro, 2001-2024, from the Global Forest Change dataset.

This territory is located between two ecosystems: the Central Forest and the Central Littoral.

Due to deforestation, the primary resource of the department, which is the forestall resource, is nowadays the most affected, all as a result of the human activity.

Some plant species are in danger of extinction, such as: yvyra paje, cedar, nandyta, victoria cruziana. And among the animal species: the tucan guazú (big toucan), guazutí, jacaré overo, mboi jagua and lobopé.

The protected areas are: part of the San Joaquín Mountains, Blanca Lagoon, and the Milagros and Puerto Rosario Swamps.

==== Environment ====
In 2023 and 2024, in the Eastern Region of Paraguay, the San Pedro Department had the most fires.

== Economy ==
The most important economic activity is cattle farming, and a moderate exploit of agriculture and almost no industry.

The region's most important products are: cotton, soy, sugar cane, tobacco, beans, corn, banana, wheat, manioc, sour and sweet oranges.

It is considered the number one tobacco, orange and grapefruit producer in the country, and the second best in production of sugar cane.

There is also cultivation of sorghum, tangerine, garlic and potatoes.

San Pedro is the second best department in cattle and the first in production of poultry, such as turkey, goose and guinea fowl.

The industries are: the cotton gin industry, yerba mills and distilleries of petit grain. In less proportion there are also sawmills and food industries such as coconut oil and starch producers.

The sawmills have an important volume of production of different kinds of woods.

== Communication and Services ==
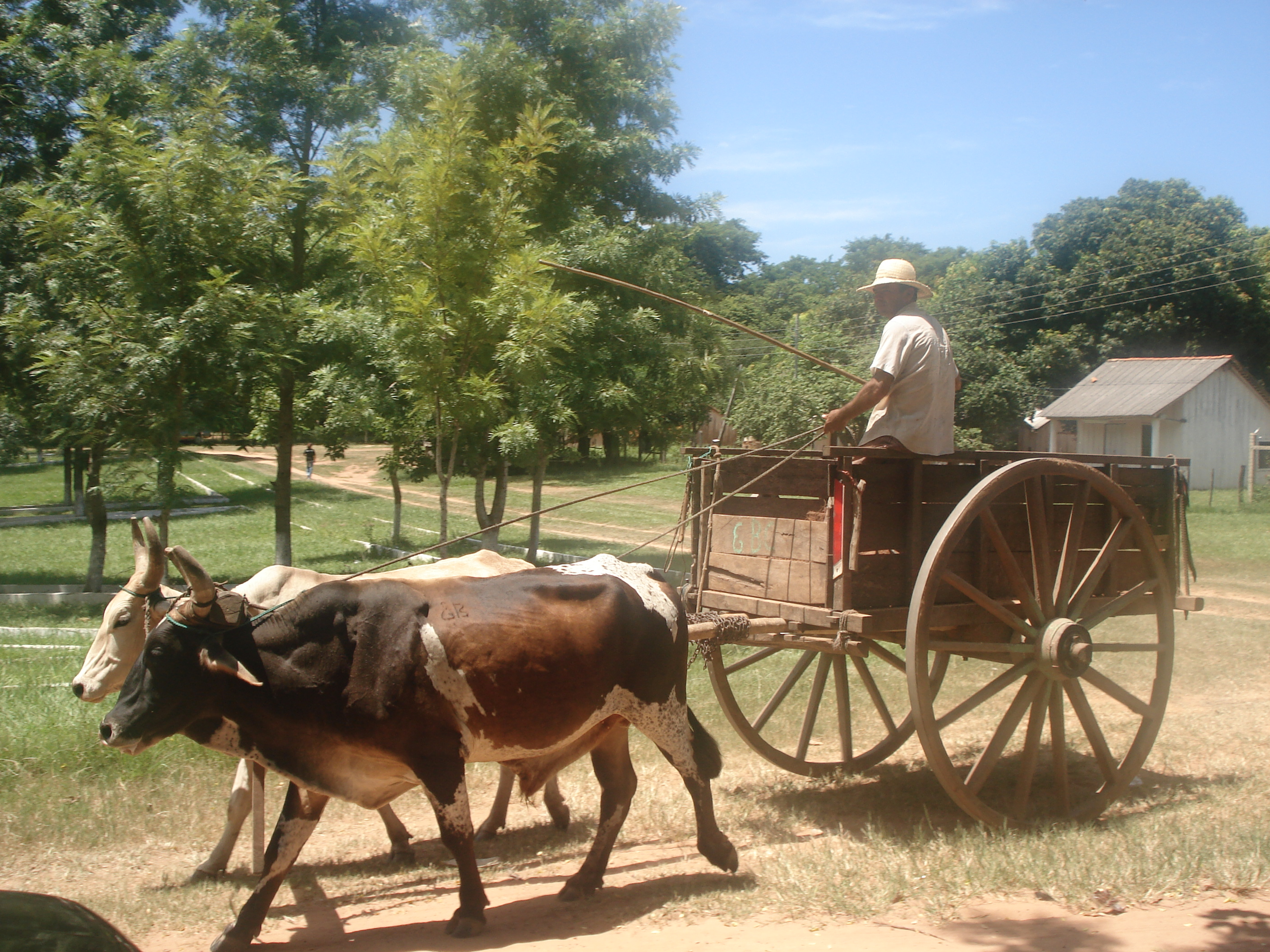
A cart in Veinticinco de Diciembre San Pedro department

San Pedro has well paved roads that travel through the department, link all the districts, and join to national routes "Gral Elizardo Aquino" (Route 3), "Dr. Blas Garay" (Route 8), "Las Residentas" (Route 10) and "Juana de Lara" (Route 11).

The Paraguay, Aguray Guazú and Jejuí rivers are navigable and allow the transportation of wood from San Pedro to other localities.

There are runways for medium-sized airplanes in the cities of San Estanislao, San Pedro, Villa del Rosario y Lima, which allow access to the city by air.

San Pedro has more than 6,000 phone lines installed.

The radio stations Ykuamandyju and Ñasaindy transmit in AM, and the stations Santaní, Choré, Amistad, San Estanislao, Tapiracuai, La Voz del Campesino and Libertad transmit in FM. The city also has television channels, a post office, and public transportation.

In San Pedro are 54,707 housings: 8,251 in the urban area and 46,456 in the rural area.

== Education ==
The department has 525 primary schools, 901 basic education schools and 150 high schools (according to the Paraguayan education system).

== Health ==
There are 101 health establishments distributed throughout the entire department.

== Tourism ==
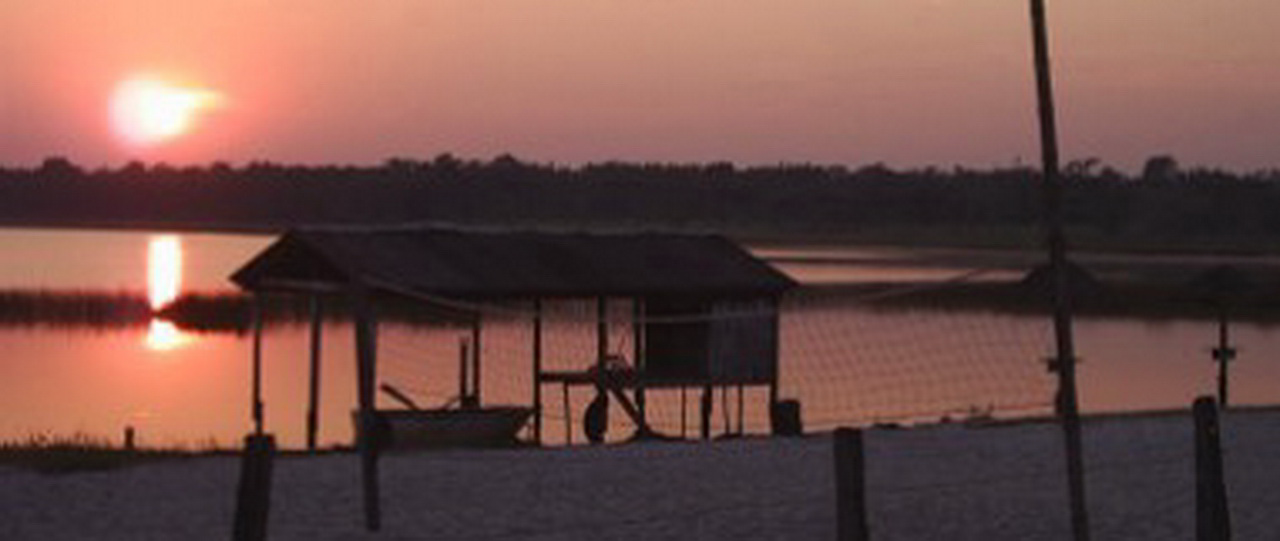
Sunset in Laguna Blanca, Santa Rosa.

In San Pedro City, capital of the department, there is a cathedral from the year 1854, the Señor Francisco Resquín Historical Museum and the House of Culture, which are interesting tourist points.

By the Jejuí River, there is a spring, the Ykua Mandyju, which has white sand beaches.

In Itacurubí del Rosario, there is another spring, the Ykua Salas, very frequented by tourists.

Laguna Blanca, in the district of Santa Rosa del Aguaray, is an ecologic and tourist point, where there is a lake with completely transparent water.

In San Estanislao is the House of Culture and Historical Museum, which was the first Jesuit school, before becoming a barrack for the Marshall López, during the Paraguayan War.
