= Santa Rosa del Aguaray =

District in Paraguay

Coordinates: 23.8833°S 56.5667°W

Santa Rosa del Aguaray is a distrito in the San Pedro Department of Paraguay.
