= Departments of Paraguay =

First-level administrative divisions of Paraguay

Capital District and Departments of Paraguay Distrito Capital y Departamentos de Paraguay (Spanish) Paraguái Távusu ha Retãvorekuera (Guarani)
- Category: Unitary state
- Location: Republic of Paraguay
- Number: 17 departments 1 capital district
- Populations: Departments only: 17,608 (Alto Paraguay) – 1,866,562 (Central)
- Areas: Departments only: 2,465 km^{2} (952 sq mi) (Central) – 91,669 km^{2} (35,394 sq mi) (Boquerón)
- Government: Departmental governments; National government
- Subdivisions: Districts

Paraguay consists of 17 departments (Spanish: departamentos; singular – departamento; Guarani: tetãvore) and one capital district (Spanish: distrito capital; Guarani: távusu). The country is divided into two non-official regions: The "Occidental Region" or Chaco (Boquerón, Alto Paraguay and Presidente Hayes), and the "Oriental Region" or Parana (other departments and the capital district).

== List ==
ISO 3166-2:PY	Department	Capital	Population (2022 census)	Area (km^{2})	No. of districts	Population density (pop./km^{2})
ASU	Distrito Capital	Asunción	462,241	117	6	3,951
1	Concepción	Concepción	206,181	18,051	11	11.42
2	San Pedro	San Pedro	355,175	20,002	20	17.76
3	Cordillera	Caacupé	268,037	4,948	20	54.17
4	Guairá	Villarrica	179,555	3,846	18	46.69
5	Caaguazú	Coronel Oviedo	431,519	11,474	23	37.61
6	Caazapá	Caazapá	139,479	9,496	11	14.69
7	Itapúa	Encarnación	449,642	16,525	30	27.21
8	Misiones	San Juan Bautista	111,142	9,556	10	11.63
9	Paraguarí	Paraguarí	200,472	8,705	17	23.03
10	Alto Paraná	Ciudad del Este	763,702	14,895	22	51.27
11	Central	Areguá	1,883,927	2,465	19	764.3
12	Ñeembucú	Pilar	76,719	12,147	16	6.32
13	Amambay	Pedro Juan Caballero	179,412	12,933	5	13.87
14	Canindeyú	Saltos del Guairá	191,114	14,667	13	13.03
15	Presidente Hayes	Villa Hayes	123,313	72,907	9	1.69
16	Alto Paraguay	Fuerte Olimpo	17,195	82,349	5	0.21
17	Boquerón	Filadelfia	71,078	91,669	6	0.78
–	Paraguay	Asunción	6,109,903	406,752	261	15.02

== See also ==
- ISO 3166-2:PY
- List of regions of Paraguay by Human Development Index
- Ranked list of Paraguayan departments
