= Football Federation of the 4th Department Guairá =

The Football Federation of the 4th Department Guairá (Federación de Fútbol Cuarto Departamento Guairá) is the departamental governing body of football (soccer) in the department of Guairá, in Paraguay. The federation is responsible for the organization of football leagues in the different cities of the department and it is also the regulator of the clubs. The main office of this federation is located in the city of Villarrica.

Tournaments for each league of this federation are played every year to determine the best teams. Afterwards, the champions of each league face each other to determine the best team in the department, with the overall winner being promoted to a higher division in the Paraguayan football league system.

== Leagues in Guairá ==
=== Liga Azucarera de Fútbol ===
The Liga Azucarera de Fútbol is based in the city of Tebicuary. The following teams are part of this league:

- 27 de Noviembre
- 29 de Setiembre
- 3 de Mayo
- Sportivo Capellan
- Nacional
- Sportivo Loma Pindo
- Libertad

=== Liga Deportiva Gral. Eugenio A. Garay ===
The Liga Deportiva Gral. Eugenio A. Garay is based in the city of General Eugenio A. Garay. The following teams are part of this league:

- Sol de Ybytyruzu
- Juventud Unidos
- 12 de Junio
- 15 de Agosto
- 25 de Enero
- Atletico Juvenil
- Sportivo San Antonio
- Sportivo Union
- Sportivo 3 de Mayo Cerrito
- 24 de Junio
- 19 de Marzo

=== Liga Guaireña de Fútbol ===
The Liga Guaireña de Fútbol is based in the city of Villarrica. The following teams are part of this league:A la pagina de la liga

- Estero Bellaco
- Silvio Pettirossi
- Cerro Cora
- Olimpia
- Atletico Guarani
- Sportivo Ñumí
- Deportivo Atletico Central
- Parque del Guairá
- 3 de Febrero
- Deportivo Rincón

=== Liga Iturbeña de Fútbol ===
The Liga Iturbeña de Fútbol is based in the city of Iturbe. The following teams are part of this league:

- Club Sport Juventud
- Atletico El Porvenir
- 12 de Junio
- 4 de Octubre
- 27 de Noviembre
- 25 de Noviembre
- Union S.D. Potrero San Genaro
- Deportivo Rojas Potrero

=== Liga Deportiva José Fassardi ===
The Liga Deportiva José Fassardi is based in the city of José Fassardi. The following teams are part of this league:

- Capitán Miranda
- Atlético Santa Rosa
- Destello Juvenil (el mejor equipo de la zona)
- Independiente FBC
- Deportivo Santa Rosa
- 12 de Junio
- Fassardi Sport Club
- Sagrado Corazón de Jesús

=== Liga Deportiva Paso Yobai ===
The Liga Deportiva Paso Yobai is based in the city of Paso Yobai. The following teams are part of this league:

- Deportivo Azteca
- 12 de Octubre
- S.D. Carai Chive
- Atlético Independiente
- Atlético Juventud
- Atlético 8 de Diciembre
- Sportivo Caaguy Poty

=== Liga Deportiva de Ybytyruzú ===
The Liga Deportiva de Ybytyruzú is based in the city of Mbocayaty del Guairá. The following teams are part of this league:

- Sportivo Santa Bárbara
- General Francisco Roa
- Cerro Porteño
- 1 de Marzo
- 20 de Julio
- Guaraní
- Cap. Troche
- Independiente
- 8 de Diciembre
- 15 de Mayo
- Deportivo Juventud
- Sol de America
- Dr. Botrell

=== Liga Itapeña de Fútbol ===
The Liga Itapeña de Fútbol is based in the city of Itapé. The following teams are part of this league:

- Deportivo San Ignacio
- Libertad
- 15 de Mayo
- Tte.Villagra
- Olimpia
- Cerro Porteño
- Nacional
- General Caballero
- 8 de Diciembre
- San Miguel
- Guaraní
- Deportivo Union
- FC Guaraní
- 3 de Mayo
- Rubio Ñu

=== Liga Independencia de Futbol ===
The Liga Independencia de Futbol is based in the city of Melgarejo. The following teams are part of this league:

- Vista Alegre
- 19 de Julio
- Rubio Ñu
- Atlético Santa Cecilia
- Deportivo Alemán
- Sport Pañetey
- Independencia
- 11 Estrellas
- Independiente
- Atlético Carlos Pfannl
- Sport Portero del Carmen
- Deportivo Yroysa
