= Telephone numbers in Paraguay =

- Country: Paraguay
- Continent: South America
- Country code: +595
- International access: 00
- Long-distance: 0

Telephone numbers in Paraguay all have the same format since 2002, consisting of the country code (595), followed by a phone number.

Phone numbers in Paraguay have 9 digits. The first two or three digits are the area code, the remaining six or seven digits are the subscriber number.

According to ITU document for Paraguay, the national number format for the basic telephony service may have 2 variations:

National number
Area code	Subscriber number
A B	X Y Z M C D U
A B E	X Y M C D U

Where A is NOT equal to 0, 1, 8 and 9; and B, X and Y is NOT equal to 0.

To make local calls inside Paraguay, the 6- or 7-digit subscriber number is used.

To make a call to cell phone, dial "0" + the number of cell phone.

To make inter-provincial calls, it is required to dial prefix "0" followed by (P)QR code + the 9-digit phone number.

(P)QR is the code for long-distance basic service providers which have the following format: (P)[2-7][1-8]. Presently(?), digit "P" is reserved. Thus, only 2 digits "QR" are used presently.

To make an international call, it is required to dial prefix "00" followed by (P)QR code + the international number.

Numbers starting with the digit "1" are used for special services like Ambulance - 128.

== List of area codes in Paraguay ==
=== Telephone line ===
City	Area Code
Acahay	535
Alberdi	780
Areguá	291
Asunción	21
Atyrá	520
Ayolas	72
Bella Vista (Amambay)	38
Bella Vista (Itapúa) (urban)	767
Bella Vista (Itapúa) (rural)	873
Benjamín Aceval	271
Caacupé	511
Caaguazú	522
Caapucú	5368
Caarendy (rural)	873
Caazapá	542
Capiatá	28
Capiíbary	453
Capitán Bado	37
Capitán Miranda	71
Capitán Miranda (urban)	718
Capitán Miranda (rural)	873
Caraguatay	517
Carapeguá	532
Cargil	644
Carmen del Paraná	762
Cedrales	633
Ciudad del Este	61
Colonia 3 De Mayo	5478
Colonia Independencia	548
Colonia Loma Plata	918
Colonia Neuland	951
Colonia Nueva Esperanza	464
Colonia Volendam	451
Colonia Yguazú	632
Concepción	31
Coronel Bogado	741
Coronel Oviedo	521
Corpus Christi	345
Curuguaty	48
Emboscada	529
Encarnación	71
Eusebio Ayala	514
Fernando de la Mora	21
Filadelfia (urban)	91
Filadelfia (rural)	94
Fram	761
General Delgado	740
General José Eduvigis Díaz	787
General Elizardo Aquino	418
General Artigas	743
Guarambaré	293
Hernandarias	631
Hohenau	75
Horqueta	32
Itá	24
Itacurubí de la Cordillera	518
Itacurubí del Rosario	41
Itapé	554
Itauguá	294
Iturbe	546
José Domingo Ocampos	527
Juan Emilio O'Leary	674
Juan Eulogio Estigarribia	528
Juan Eulogio Estigarribia (rural)	871
Juan León Mallorquín	675
Juan Manuel Frutos	524
Julián Augusto Saldívar	295
Katueté and La Paloma	471
Kressburgo	672
La Colmena	537
La Paz	763
La Paz (rural)	873
Lambaré	21
Limpio	21
Loreto	33
Luque	21
Maciel	5428
Maria Auxiliadora	764
Mariano Roque Alonso	21
Mariscal Estigarribia	952
Mauricio José Troche	550
Mayor Otaño	671
Minga Guazú	644
Naranjal	676
Ñemby	21
Nueva Italia	292
Obligado	717
Paraguarí	531
Paso de Patria	785
Paso Yobay	552
Pedro Juan Caballero	36
Pilar	86
Pirapó	768
Pirayú	519
Piribebuy	515
Pozo Colorado (rural)	93
Presidente Franco	61
Puente Kyha	47
Quiíndy	536
Salto del Guairá	46
San Alberto	677
San Antonio	21
San Bernardino	512
San Cosme y Damián	73
San Estanislao	43
San Ignacio	782
San José de los Arroyos	523
San Juan Bautista	81
San Juan Nepomuceno	544
San Juan Ñeembucú	784
San Lázaro and Vallemí	351
San Lorenzo	21
San Miguel	783
San Patricio	8588
San Pedro del Paraná	742
San Pedro del Ycua Mandyju	42
San Roque González de Santa Cruz	538
Santa María	781
Santa Rita	673
Santa Rosa (Misiones)	858
Santa Rosa del Monday	678
Santiago	782
Sapucaí	539
Tebicuary	553
Tobatí	516
Valle Pucu	21
Villa del Rosario	44
Villa Elisa	21
Villa Florida	83
Villa Hayes	26
Villarrica	541
Villeta	25
Yaguarón	533
Yataity	549
Yby Yaú	39
Ybycuí	534
Yegros	545
Ypacaraí	513
Ypané	275
Yuty	547

=== Mobile phones ===
Company	Code
Claro	991/2/3/5
Personal	971/2/3/5/6
Tigo	981/2/3/4/5
VOX	961/3

The generic format for mobile numbers is:

Mobile telephony service number
Mobile service code	Block code	Internal number
9	X Y Z W	M C D U

Where X is NOT equal to 0 and 1.
