= Route 10 (Paraguay) =

National Route 10
- Ruta nacional PY10
- PY10 highlighted in red

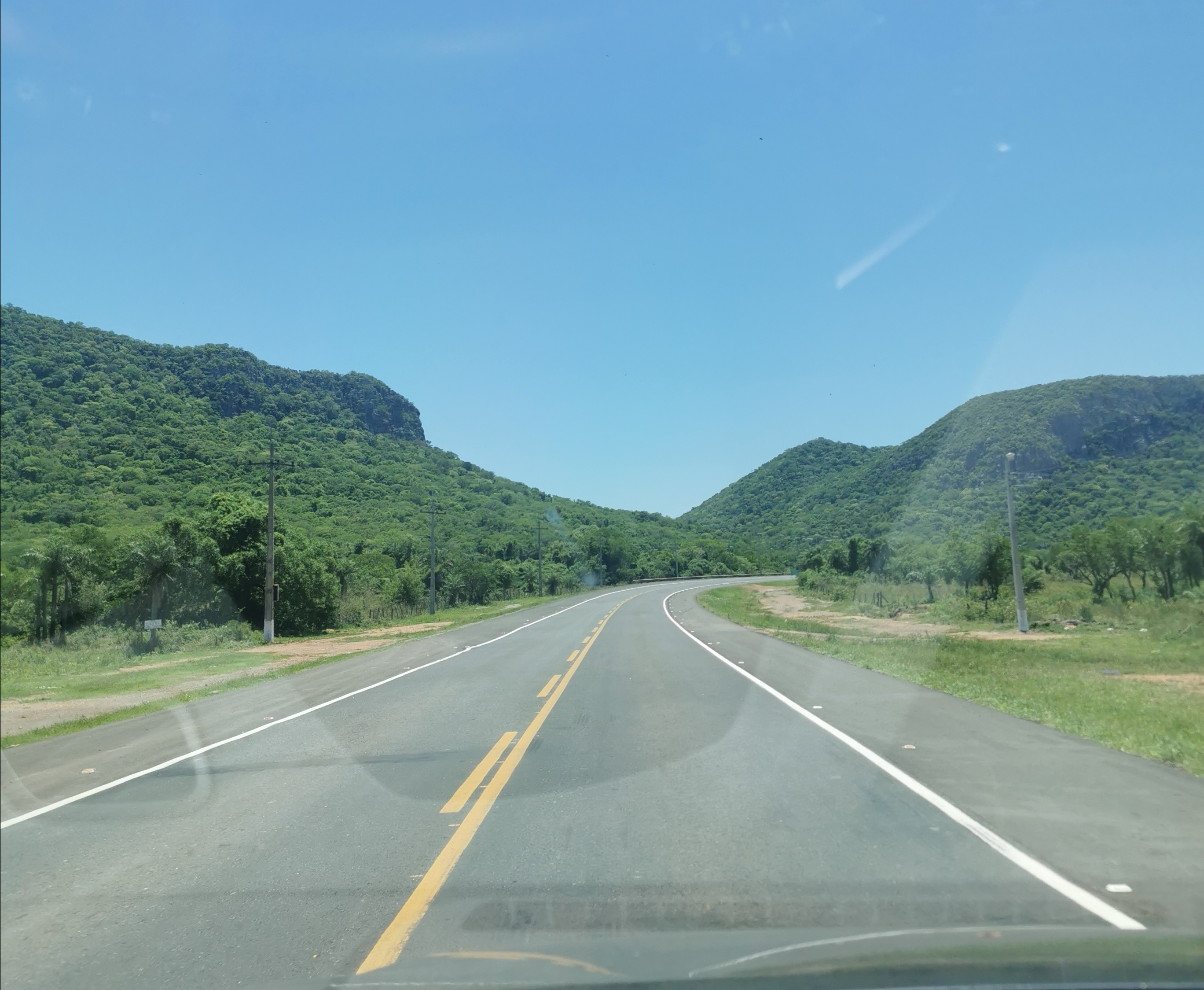
- PY10 near the city of Paraguarí.

Route information
- Length: 242 km (150 mi)

Major junctions
- East end: Naranjal
- West end: Paraguarí

Location
- Country: Paraguay

Highway system
- Highways in Paraguay

National Route 10 (officially, PY10, simply known as Ruta Diez) is a highway in Paraguay, which runs from Naranjal to Paraguarí, connecting the Guairá, Caazapá and Alto Paraná departments.

== Distances, cities and towns ==
The following table shows the distances traversed by National Route 10 in each different department, showing cities and towns that it passes by (or near).

Km	City	Department	Junctions
0	Naranjal	Alto Paraná	PY06
30	San Cristóbal	Alto Paraná	
47	Tuparenda	Caazapá	
64	Tuna	Caazapá	
77	San Agustín	Caazapá	
100	Paso Yobai	Guairá	PY13
120	Independencia	Guairá	
124	Melgarejo	Guairá	
145	Mbocayaty	Guairá	
150	Villarrica	Guairá	PY08
160	Félix Pérez Cardozo	Guairá	
170	Coronel Martínez	Guairá	
175	Tebicuary-mí	Paraguarí	
191	Ybytimí	Paraguarí	
205	Gral. Bernardino Caballero	Paraguarí	
215	Sapucaí	Paraguarí	
225	Escobar	Paraguarí	
242	Paraguarí	Paraguarí	PY01
