= Juan Carlos Herken Krauer =

German-Paraguayan economist (born 1953)

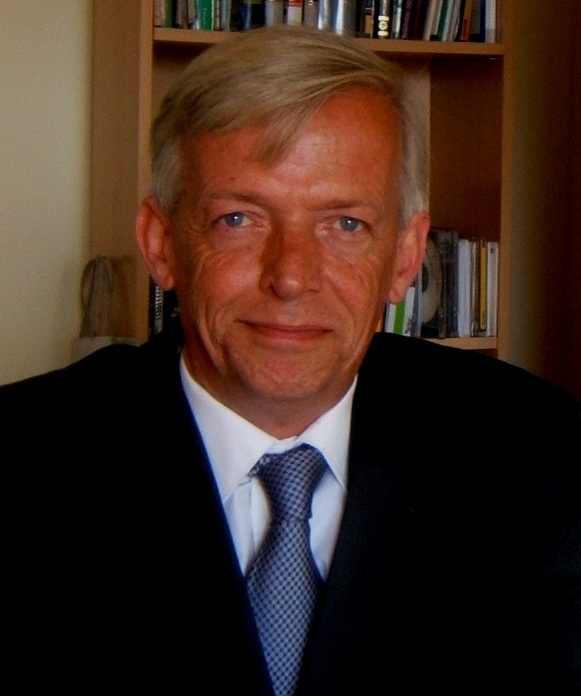
- Born: 24 January 1953; Tebicuary, Paraguay
- Education: Birkbeck College, London; The London School of Economics
- Occupations: Economist, historian, writer
- Spouse(s): María Isabel Giménez Abente: (*1954-†1998), (1977–1983)
- Writing career
- Notable works: El Mercader de Ilusiones, La Villa de Amatista
- Notable awards: Guggenheim Fellowship, Humanities, Latin America

Juan Carlos Herken Krauer (born 24 January 1953) is a German–Paraguayan economist, historian, journalist, writer and professor. His novel "The Amethyst Villa" won the Literature Prize of the city of Asunción in 2004. "Esperando al Quebrantahuesos", his fifth novel, was published in 2019. His most recent academic publications are focused on the globalised "education industry", redefining the accounting identity of "educational capital", by introducing the novel category of "prestige capital". He also proposes the concept of "the teacher as the modern Sisyphus", within the context of the prisoner's dilemma approach, in order to capture the increasing constraints and ethical issues overwhelming the modern teacher.

== Education and career ==
He was born in Tebicuary, district of Coronel Martínez, Guairá on January 24, 1953, a descendant of German and Swiss-German families who migrated to Paraguay in the late nineteenth century. He spent his childhood in his hometown, and then moved to Asunción where he attended primary and secondary education at the Colegio Goethe. He studied economics at the National University of Asunción and sociology at the Catholic University of Asunción in 1972. A student leader in the struggle against the dictatorship of Alfredo Stroessner in the early seventies, he took refuge in Buenos Aires in 1974. In 1981 he earned a master's degree in economics from Birkbeck College. In 1986 he received the Ph.D. at the London School of Economics and Political Science. He undertook his doctoral work first under the supervision of Hla Myint, on economic development, and then of Colin Lewis on economic history. Between 1985 and 1986 he participated in the Advanced Studies Program in International Economics of the Kiel Institute for the World Economy, University of Kiel, Germany.

== Journalism ==
His career in journalism began in 1968, writing for different student publications at the time of the dictatorship of Alfredo Stroessner; among others, in the weekly Frente, as well as radio and television ("New Generation", 1970). Collaborated with the Paraguayan news magazine Diálogo, and in 1974 he worked with different agencies and media based in Buenos Aires, including Inter Press Service, and became a correspondent for Latin American Newsletters, London, in 1975. In 1977, he moved to London where he worked as an editor and journalist (1977–1980) of Latin American Newsletters Ltd, and was editor-in.chief of Informe Semanal, first Spanish version of the newsletters of the British company. Between 1982 and 1984 he was a regular contributor to many newspapers in Latin America, through the Agencia Latinoamerica, based in Miami, Florida, US

== Economics ==
He was an economist in the department of developing countries for the American company Data Resources, McGraw Hill, London and Boston (1985), specializing in the construction of macro-econometric models for Algeria and South Africa Between 1986 and 1987 he was a researcher at the Institute of World Economics, Kiel Institute for the World Economy, in Kiel, Germany. Much of his academic bibliography focuses on economic growth, development strategies, labour market and migration, and new global corporations, as well as Latin American economies, particularly Argentina, Brazil and Paraguay. His contributions on economics are reputed to have been influenced by John Maynard Keynes and Hla Myint, while those on economic history by Fernand Braudel.

== History ==
One of his first essays published on the history of Paraguay and South America was Capitalist Development, Expansion and Brazilian Political Process in Paraguay, 1975. Once based in London, he undertook an extensive research in British archives, particularly Foreign Office materials, and in libraries in France and Germany; a first result was Britain and the War of the Triple Alliance (1864–1970), published in 1983, and written together with his then wife, Maria Isabel Gimenez of Herken (1954–1998).

His work provides information that allows a critical reevaluation of the context and causes of the great South American war of the nineteenth century, which pitted Paraguay against Argentina, Brazil and Uruguay, and generated strong arguments for the rejection of some of the "revisionist" thesis on the inescapable contradiction between the "Paraguayan model" and British interests. In a letter, dated 11 October 1983, to the authors, the Paraguayan historian Carlos Pastore, describes the work as "... the first book on the development of this war which I started reading, and also finished. In all the other cases, just after having began, I left them aside."

He then published "Rural Paraguay between 1869 and 1913. Contributions to the regional history of the Plata," published in 1984, which proposes an original regional approach to rural economic history, linking up the Northern regions of Argentina and neighboring Brazil with Paraguay. In 1984 he also published" Railways, Conspiracies and Business in Paraguay (1907–1912)", largely based on unpublished materials from the archives of the British Foreign Office, which revealed a vast network of political and financial collusion centered on the American entrepreneur Percival Farquhar, and his projects for a railway interconnection between the Atlantic and the Pacific. In 1998 he published The Economic Policy in the Liberal Era (1904–1940), and between 2010 and 2011, two essays The heritage of two wars: 1864–70 and 1932–35, and Paraguay's economy between 1940–2008: growth, convergence and uncertainties.

== Academic career ==
His teaching experience began with occasional interventions at the schools of the University of London. He was appointed Honorary Research Fellow of the Institute of Latin American Studies, University of London from 1988 to 1990. He was awarded the Guggenheim Fellowship for 1988–89. Since 1992, and based in Paris, France, served as assistant professor at the American University of Paris(1992–95), and as a professor in various Masters programs in Business Administration. He was appointed Professor of Economics at the European University, Paris, France, in 1997. In 1999 he was appointed Professor of Economics and Management at Al Akhawayn University in Ifrane, Morocco. Between 1998 and 2001 he was Professor for the Master in Economics Programme of the National University of Kyiv-Mohyla Academy, Ukraine. In 2016 he was visiting professor of economics at the Monterrey Institute of Technology and Higher Education. Between 2017 and 2018 he was visiting professor at the University of Jaén, Spain.

== Literature ==
While residing in Paraguay, he wrote poetry and short stories. In 1970 he was elected President of the Goethe Literary Academy College of Asunción, and was also founder and secretary general of the League of Literary Academys of Paraguay. In the same year he joined the editorial board of the Revista de Cultura Universitaria Criterio.

He returned to literature in the 1990s, with the appearance of his first novel, The Merchant of Illusions, in 1995. In 2003 he published The Amethyst Village, which received the Literature Prize of the City of Asunción in 2004, for his merits in "the narrative construction and the poetic use of language". In 2009 two more novels were published, The Letter of Ulysses and A Summer in Paris. He has published critical studies on the literary works of Augusto Roa Bastos, Gabriel Casaccia, Joseph Conrad, Ernst Jünger, and Julien Gracq.

== Works ==
Although he is the author of several books and essays in the area of social sciences, The Merchant of illusions is his first novel, and was published in 1995.

- Gran Bretaña y la Guerra de la Triple Alianza (1983) (co-author)
- El Paraguay Rural entre 1869 y 1913. Contribuciones a la historia económica regional del Plata (1984)
- Ferrocarriles, Conspiraciones y Negocios en el Paraguay, 1910–1914, (1984)
- Capital-intensive Industries in the newly industrializing Countries. The Brazilian automobile and steel industries, (co-author), Kiel (1988), ISBN 3163454445
- Argentine to 1992: The Search for Solutions, (co-author), Economist Intelligence Unit, (co-author), London, (1988),
- La Política Económica en la Era del Partido Liberal (1904–1940), (1989);second edition 2019
- Annäherungen, (1994)
- Hacia una Economía Política del Mercosur (1995)
- El Mercader de Ilusiones (1995) second edition, 2016, ISBN 9783000536472
- Mercado de Trabajo y Migración en el Mercosur (1996)
- Nuestros años de luna y sol, (2001)
- La Villa de Amatista, (2003),ISBN 9789000006281
- Paraguarí, (2006)
- La Carta de Ulises (2009), ISBN 9789995350703
- Un Verano en París (2009), ISBN 9789995350710
- Pedro Herken. Diario de Guerra, Chaco Paraguayo, September 1932-April 1936. Introducción, edición y anexos de Guillermo Alejandro Herken Meyer y Juan Carlos Herken Krauer, Berlín-Montevideo, (2018. ISBN 9789974942271
- Esperando al Quebrantahuesos (2019), ISBN 9781686565687
