= Yataity =

District of Guairá, Paraguay

Yataity Jata'ity
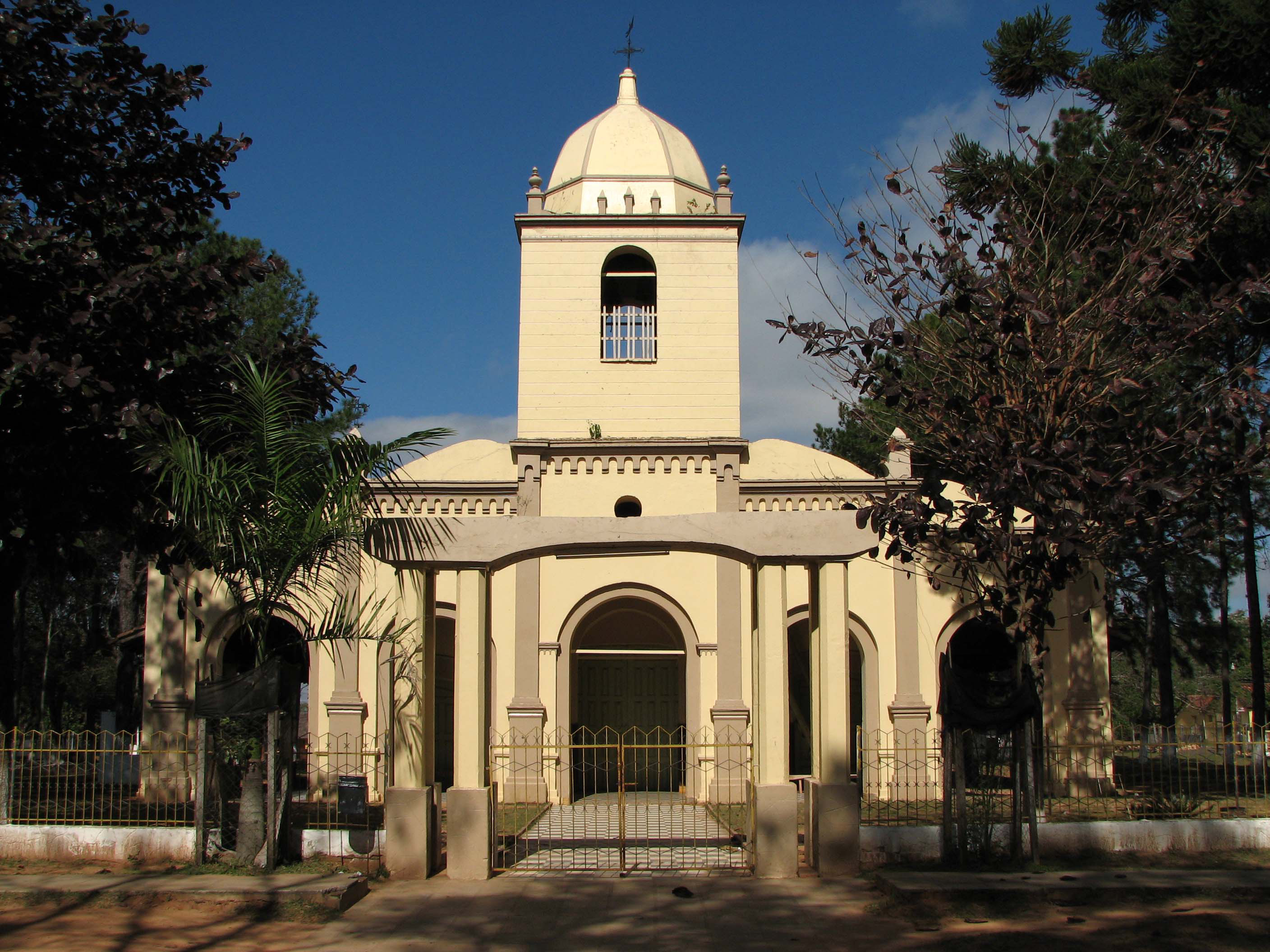

- Location within Paraguay
- Coordinates: 25°45′00″S 56°25′59″W
- Country: Paraguay
- Department: Guairá
- Founded: 1851; 175 years ago
- Founder: Bartolomé de Oviedo

Government
  - Intendente Municipal: Ramón Barrios Bogado (ANR)

Area
  - Total: 111 km^{2} (43 sq mi)

Population (2008)
  - Total: 4,138
  - Density: 37/km^{2} (96/sq mi)
- Postal code: 5140
- Area code: (595) (549)

Yataity (Guarani: Jata'ity) is one of the districts of the Guairá Department, Paraguay. It is located 164 kilometers (102 mi) east from Asunción and 17 kilometers north of the department capital, Villarrica. Yataity is known as the “Cradle of Ao Po’i” because it where this type of pure-cotton embroidery originated. This technique was passed down from generation to generation by local women and dates back to the 19th century, during which the country endured a period of isolation under the dictatorship of Gaspar de Francia.

== Toponymy ==
Its name, Yataity, comes from the Guaraní language and means “yatay palm plantations” (Yata'i is a palm-like tree). The nickname “Guairá” is used to distinguish it from other places called Yataity, such as Yataity del Norte and Yataity Corá. It is not to be confused with the municipality of Yatytay.

== History ==
The history of Yataity dates back to the time of the last settlement in Villarrica at the Ybytyruzú site in 1682. From that point on, the surrounding areas began to be explored for logging and the cultivation of yerba mate. Yataity’s establishment as a town is attributed to Captain Bartolomé de Oviedo, a native of Villarrica. Oviedo acquired land in what is now Yataity in 1809 through a royal grant and organized the settlement of the area, setting aside one plot for the cemetery and another for the construction of the first Catholic chapel in 1818. Ana de Borja, a resident of Villarrica and daughter of Captain Rodrigo de Borja, was among the first residents of the new settlement. The settlement was officially founded in 1851 on land donated by Captain Oviedo.

Besides ao po'i, inhabitants are also employed in the stock-breeding of cows, the cultivation of sugar-cane, and the exploitation of wood.

This district remains a quiet place with an image very common in the Paraguayan traditions. More than 50% of the population is engaged in the manufacture of hand-made cloths aided by primitive looms.

== Geography ==
This district occupies an area of 111 square kilometers, and is located on a bend along the western border of the Department of Guairá. It is irrigated by the Tebicuarymí River and its tributaries, the Mitay and Doña Pangracia streams. It has a total population of 4,138 inhabitants and a population density of 37.27 inhabitants per square kilometer.

=== Borders ===
- North: The Caaguazú Department, separated by the Tebicuarymí River.
- South: The city of Villarrica, separated by the Mitay Stream.
- West: The Félix Pérez Cardozo district, separated by the Mitay Stream.
- East: The Doctor Botrell and Mbocayaty districts, separated by the Tebicuarymí, and Mbocayaty.

=== Hydrography ===
The Tebicuary River and the following streams flow through the Mitay and Doña Gervasia.

== Subdivision ==
Some towns in the municipality include:

- Potrero Benegas
- Tebicuary Costa
- Capilla Cué
- Santa Rita
- Valle Pytá
- 13 de Junio
- Tajamar
- Kaaguykupé
- Capillita

== Economy ==
Most of the economy of this district is devoted to the tailoring of ao po'i garments. The community maintains an ancient tradition of weavers who still use rustic wooden looms. It is estimated that some 2,200 local residents are engaged in this type of embroidery, which means that 80% of the families living there are involved in the industry. These products are sold throughout the country and exported to Argentina, Europe, and the United States. Only 10% of the residents have other occupations, such as subsistence farming and livestock raising. 50% of the total population works on it and almost every person related to an ao po'i artisan, directly or indirectly.

According to results from the INE’s National Economic Census, in 2010 there were a total of 283 economic units in Yataity, of which 201 were engaged in industry (71%), 60 in commerce (21.2%), and 22 in services (7.8%). Revenue from industry accounted for 42.45% of total revenue.

== Infrastructure and Transportation ==
It is accessible via Routes PY02, PY08, and PY10, with a 2-kilometer stretch of Route PY08 that is fully paved. The other internal roads are gravel and earth-filled. There are buses for trips to the country’s capital and to other departments. For travel within the department, there are smaller-capacity buses. Modern buses travel to the capital of the country and to the other departments. Smaller buses provide local transportation. Wagons and riders on horseback can also be seen.

The department roads are terraced, making travel between the districts easier.

The area uses telephonic services from the Corporación Paraguaya de Comunicaciones (Copaco), as well as mobile phone service. Yataity residents receive media broadcasts and the print media from Asunción.

== Culture ==
The Ao po'í Expo Fair is one of the town's most famous events, held in Francisco Roa Square across from the church. Hundreds of artisans display and sell traditional clothing, and local families sell traditional food.

The Ao po'i Museum displays paintings featuring embroidery and the materials used to create them. It also offers workshops where visitors can learn how to make the fabric using traditional methods.

Regarding religious culture, every October 7th the town commemorates its patron saint, the Virgin of the Rosary. The festivities begin with a novena held at the town church and continue with the Paraguayan version of a bullfight known as “torín.” An amusement park is set up. In the evening, a dance party is organized with live musical performances. The next day, the Main Mass is celebrated by the town priest, followed by a procession carrying the image of the Virgin. Once the procession ends, the “jineteada”—the local version of the “corrida de sortija”—begins, and a barbecue is cooked over an open fire. In the afternoon, the final bullfight takes place to bring the celebration to a close.

The town still has several colonial-style homes, and many residents still travel on horseback and in horse-drawn carts.

== Characteristics ==
Yataity is known as a little and peaceful city with its big houses with straw roofs and ancestral streets. It is known especially for its most notable craftsmanship: the ao po'i, a fine cloth made in cotton that can be seen in shirts, dresses, blouses, sheets and other items. Hundreds of artisans of Yataity take part in the "Typical Vestments Market" held in the central square every November.

The annual expo of ao po'i is a chance for the artisans of the zone to show their creativity. Their pieces show up their fine finishing and high quality. It is estimated that around 2,200 people are involved in the manufacture of ao po'i in this district, making of it a major source of employment. Most of the specialized artisans are from Yataity, where thanks to the support of private companies, they combine tradition and modernity for production of shirts that meet the required quality standards for export.

The ao po'i is made by hand in a 100% cotton fabric that appeared in the 18th century due to the prohibition of foreign trade imposed by Gaspar Rodríguez de Francia. The women had to manually tailor the cotton to make the vestments. While the production of ao po'i has extended to other parts of the country, local residents insist that the best clothes fashioned from ao po'i are made by the artisans of Yataity.

== Demography ==
The main social-demographic indicators in the district indicate:

- Population under 15 years old: 31.1%
- Average children per woman: 2.7 children
- Percentage of illiterates: 7.6%
- Percentage of the population occupied in agricultural activities: 22.8%
- Percentage of houses with electricity service: 95.0%
- Percentage of houses with water service: 36.8%

Population with unsatisfied basic needs in:

- Education: 6.2%
- Sanitary infrastructure: 22.6%
- Housing quality: 30.1%
- Subsistence capacity: 6.3%

== Population ==
According to the data provided by the General Office of Statistics, Polls and Census, this is the data of the Yataity district:

The total population is 4,138 inhabitants, being 2,040 males and 2,099 females.

- Population from 0 to 14 years old: 31.1%
- Population from 15 to 64 years old: 59.1%
- Population from 65 years old: 9.8%

Being 53,75% of the population settled in the rural zone.

== Tourism ==
The Ao Po'i Market is one of the most awaited events in this district. The year round markets featuring local artisans also attract visitors.

Its colonial look, ancient houses, tree-populated streets, squares, intricate craftsmanship, and hospitality of its people and preference for Paraguayan tradition makes Yataity a popular alternative for internal tourism.
