= Mbocayaty =

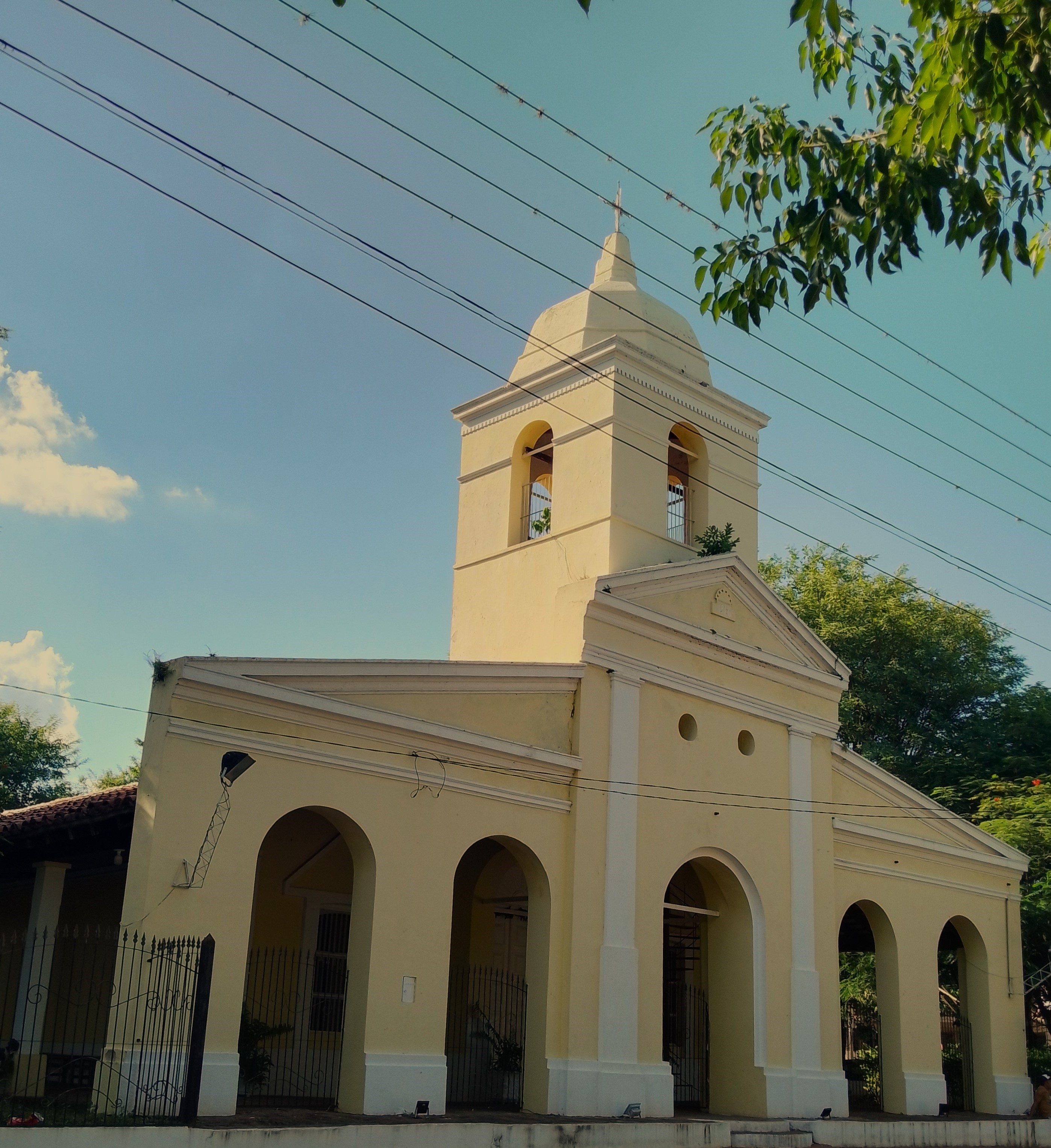
- Church in Mbocayaty

- Location within Paraguay
- Coordinates: 25°43′12″S 56°25′12″W
- Country: Paraguay
- Department: Guairá Department
- Established: 1800s
- Founder: Jose Mariano Duarte

Population (2022)
  - Total: 8,003

Mbocayaty (Guaraní: Mbokajaty) is a town in the Guairá Department of Paraguay. Its located 7 km to the north of Villarrica and 166 km to the east of Asuncion.

Originally known as Capilla Duarte (Spanish Duarte Chapel) due to the Catholic chapel built in the 1800s by a family named Duarte. Its current name comes from the Guarani language expression Mbokaja + ty, meaning ¨land with many macaw palms"

== History and geography ==
It was founded due to a land donation by a Catholic priest named Jose Mariano Duarte. Jose Mariano, the first priest and possibly the first school teacher in the area, had inherited the lands from his father, General Carlos Duarte. The Duarte family was from Villarrica.

In 1903, it was upgraded to municipality disengaged from Villarrica. The first president of its gubernatorial board was Juan de la Cruz Talavera.

During the Paraguayan War, many female residents of what is now Mbocayaty donated their jewelry to help the war effort, and several local families donated part of their livestock to feed the soldiers. Since the XX century, the original territory of Mbocayaty started to be divided to lay the foundations of new towns like Natalicio in 1931, Independencia in 1955 and Bottrell in 1983.

Mbocayaty is irrigated by the Tebicuarymi River and its tributary streams such as Ita, Yaguarete and Gervasia. It borders Bottrell to the North, separated by the Tebicuarymi River, Villarrica to the South, through a stream named Bobo, the towns of Natalicio and Independencia to the east, and the town of Yataity to the west.

== Sources ==
- World Gazeteer: Paraguay – World-Gazetteer.com
