= General Eugenio A. Garay =

General Eugenio Alejandrino Garay
- Location within Paraguay
- Coordinates: 25.750°S 56.433°W
- Country: Paraguay
- Department: Guairá

Population (2017)
  - Total: 8,389

General Eugenio Alejandrino Garay, colloquially known as Garay, is a district in the Guairá Department of Paraguay. It is located approximately 216 kilometres (134 mi) from Asunción, the capital of Paraguay.

It originally belonged to the Caazapá Department but was transferred to Guairá due to its large area. It was established as a municipality by Law No. 260 on June 23, 1955.

The district is accessible via Route PY08 and is situated south of the city of Villarrica, passing through the city of Ñumí. Within Garay's area lies Cerro Tres Kandú, which at 842 metres (2,762 ft) above sea level is the highest point in Paraguay. Its inhabitants mainly engage in livestock activities and the district also has plywood factories.

== Toponymy ==
Its name honors Eugenio Garay, a Paraguayan military figure during the Chaco War, known for being the oldest officer in the army (at 60 years old) and for his major victory at the Battle of Yrendagüé. There, he led a daring mission of 1,400 men who walked 70 kilometres (43 mi) over three days to capture important water wells, resulting in about 6,000 casualties for the Bolivian army.

Its original name in Guarani was Chararã, meaning "Noisy."

== Geography ==
The Ybytyruzú Range, which includes Cerro Tres Kandú, is the highest point in Paraguay. It was originally inhabited by the Aché ethnic group, and during the last ice age, it was the only place in the area where vegetation did not disappear.

It borders the Ybytyruzú Range to the north, which separates it from Colonia Independencia; to the south with the Caazapá Department, to the east with Fassardi, and to the west with Iturbe and Ñumí.

The main road connection is Route PY08, which connects it with Asunción and other localities in the department. There are also extensive paved and unpaved roads that facilitate the transportation of goods and people.

The district has airstrips for small planes, telephone services by Copaco and cellular telephony, various media outlets, and newspapers from the capital are distributed to all districts.

== Hydrography ==
The district is watered by the Pirapó Guazú, Pirapomí, Itacuñá, and Yhacá Guazú streams.

== Climate ==
The average annual temperature is 22 °C (72 °F); it can reach up to 38-39 °C in the summer and can drop to 0 °C (32 °F) in the winter.

== Demographics ==
The total population of the district is 8,389. According to data from the DGEEC, 86.21% of the population lives in rural areas.

== Economy ==
The main economic activity of the district is livestock farming, including the raising of cattle, goats, pigs, and horses. Regarding agriculture, the area has crops of cotton, tobacco, sweet cane, wheat, yerba mate, and grapes.
