= Capitán Mauricio José Troche =

- Location within Paraguay
- Coordinates: 25°45′00″S 56°26′00″W
- Country: Paraguay
- Department: Guairá
- Founded: 1919

Government
  - Intendente Municipal: Sofía Cardozo de Aquino

Area
  - Total: 63 km^{2} (24 sq mi)

Population (2008)
  - Total: 9,539
  - Density: 151.41/km^{2} (392.2/sq mi)
- Time zone: -4 Gmt
- Postal code: 5520
- Area code: (595) (546)

Mauricio José Troche is one of the districts in the Guairá department, Paraguay. It is located 183 km away from Asunción, capital of Paraguay.

In this area the population dedicates mostly to the agriculture and farming. They also dedicate to the artisan fabrication of ao po’i.

The production of sugar cane is very important because it is industrialized, obtaining as a result fuel alcohol.

== Municipality ==
This Municipality was founded in 1919. It can be accessed through Route No. VIII “Dr. Blás Garay” and it is located in the north part of the Guairá department.

The current governor is Sofía Cardozo de Aquino, from the ANR Party. She will occupy the position until 2010.

== Geography ==
The district of Captain Mauricio José Troche is located in the north area of the Guairá department, in a well defined region of the Occidental region of the department; the area is the most fertile and populated.

=== Extension ===
This district has an extension of 63 square kilometers, with a total population of 9,539 inhabitants; the population density is 151.41 inhabitants per square kilometer, most of it in the rural sector.

=== Climate ===
The climate usually is mild and healthy. The average annual temperature is 22°C; it reaches 38° or 39°C in summer and drops to 0°C in winter.

July and August are the months with less rain, the rest of the year it rains about 138 mm that reach an annual average of 1,600 mm. November and October are the rainiest months.

=== Limits ===
The districts borders on:

- Caaguazú department to the north
- Natalicio Talavera, Colonia Independencia and Paso Yobái districts to the south
- Paso Yobái district to the east
- Doctor Botrell district to the west

=== Hydrography ===
This district is watered by the Tebicuary-mi River and the streams:

- Itacarú
- Morotí

== Demographics ==
The main social and demographic indicators:

- Population under the age of 15: 38.4%
- Children per woman: 3.0
- Percentage of illiterate inhabitants: 8.1%
- Population that work in the primary sector: 55.6%
- Population that work in the secondary sector: 18.3%
- Population that work in the tertiary sector: 25.6%
- Housings with electric power service: 91.6%
- Housings with running water service: 30.5%

Population with unsatisfied basic needs:

- Population with no access to education: 7.2%
- Population with no access to health infrastructures: 22.8%
- Population with no good living conditions: 34.2%
- Population with no capacity to subsistence: 13.3%

== Economy ==
The principal activity in the district is the agriculture, being the sugar cane the most important plantation. Guairá department is the number one producer of sugar cane in the country.

Between 1972 and 1983 the production doubled, and since then presented a constant increment. The great vantage point about this production is the industrialization of raw material, turning sugar cane into sugar, fuel alcohol or rum.

In the district is the factory of absolute alcohol, that the ex Paraguayan Alcohol Administration passed to Paraguayan Petroleum, Petropar.

Other important plantations are: cotton, tobacco, wheat, yerba mate and fruits such as grapes.

Cows, goats, pigs and horses livestock is also an important activity.

== How to get there ==
To get to Mauricio José Troche district, from Asunción, capital of the country, it is necessary to travel through Route No. VIII “Dr. Blás Garay” until arriving to Villarrica, cross Mbocayaty and Natalicio Talavera districts.

== Communication ==
The most important way of access to the city is Route No. VIII “Dr. Blás Garay”, which connects this district with the capital of the country and other localities in the department.

It has telephone service from Copaco Company (a state company) and the service of movie phone companies, as well as newspapers and other means of communication.

== Transportation ==
The most important way of access to the city is Route No. VIII “Dr. Blás Garay”. It has other pebbled roads that communicate with paved roads that make easier the transportation.

The common mean of transportation are buses, which travel to the capital and also do an inter tour through the district.

== Population ==
According to the information provided by the General Direction of Polls, Statistics and Census:

- Population under the age of 14: 38.4%
- Population between 15 and 64 years old: 56.3%
- Population over the age of 65: 5.4%
- Most of the population lives in the rural area.

== Tourism ==
A common touristic activity in the district is the rural safari.

== Art and culture ==
In the district, part of the population dedicates to make ao po’i. There’s also native art.

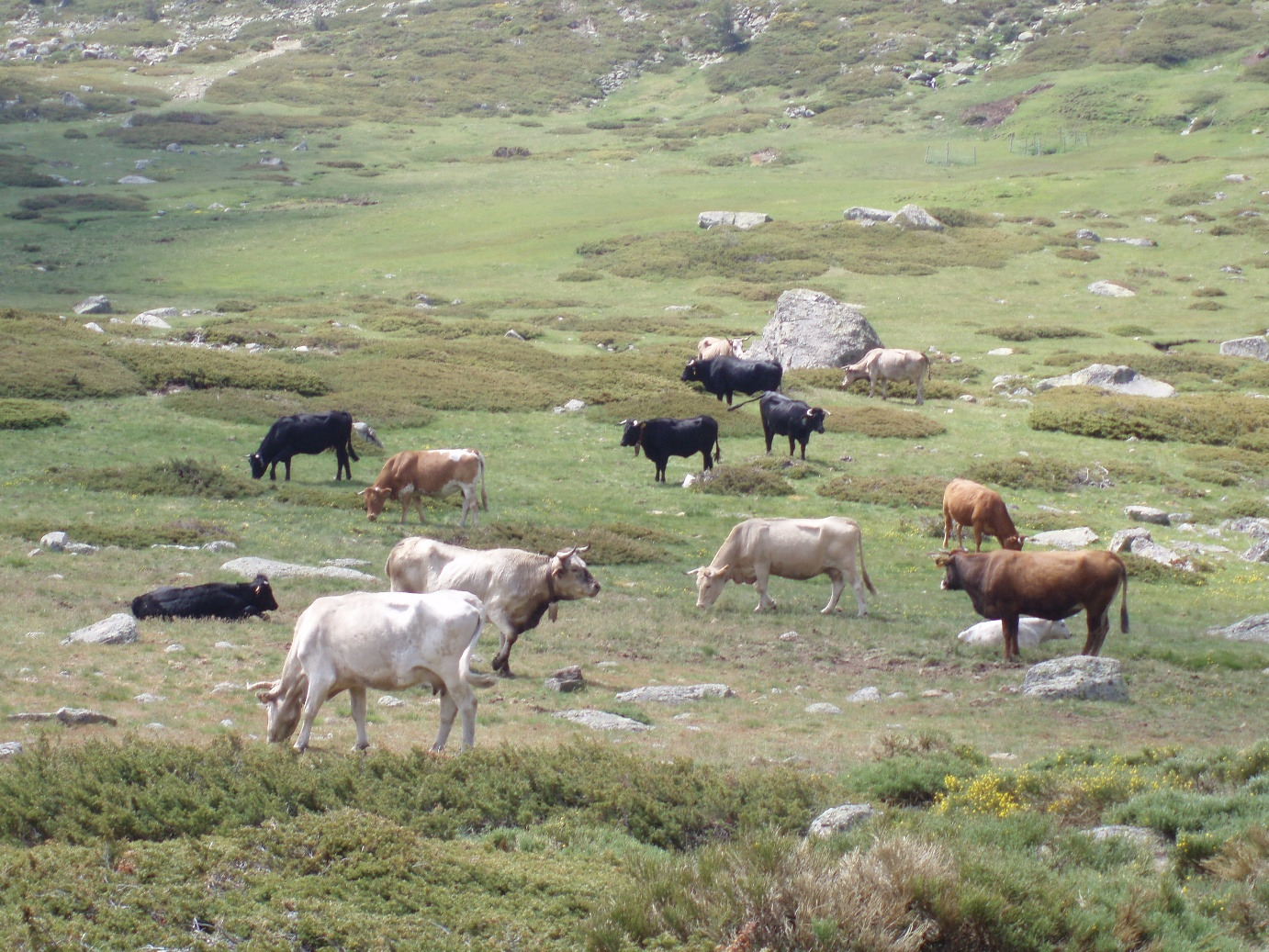
