= San Salvador, Paraguay =

San Salvador
- Location within Paraguay
- Coordinates: 25°45′00″S 56°26′0″W
- Country: Paraguay
- Department: Guairá

Government
  - Intendente Municipal: Darío Ramón Ruiz Herrera

Area
  - Total: 140 km^{2} (54 sq mi)

Population (2008)
  - Total: 3,483
  - Density: 24.88/km^{2} (64.4/sq mi)
- Time zone: -4 Gmt
- Postal code: 5200
- Area code: (595) (540)

San Salvador is a district of the Guairá Department, Paraguay. It is located in 18 kilometers southwest of Villarrica.

== Area ==
This district has an area of 14 square kilometers, with a total population of 3,483 inhabitants and a population density of 24.88 inhabitants per square kilometer.

== Limits ==
- North: The city of Villarrica, capital of the department.
- South: The Iturbe district.
- West: The Borja district.
- East: The Ñumí and Iturbe districts.

== Hydrography ==
The following streams flow through the district:

- Remansito.
- Yhacá Guazú.
- Itacuña.

== Demographics ==
According to the data provided by the General Office of Statistics, Polls and Census, this is the data of the San Salvador district:

- Population from 0 to 14 years old: 35.2%
- Population from 15 to 64 years old: 56.4%
- Population from 65 years old: 8.4%
- Average number of children per family: 3.1 kids
- Illiteracy rate: 10.5%
- Percentage of the population occupied in agricultural activities: 65.6%
- Percentage of houses with electricity: 89.4%
- Percentage of houses with water service: 33.8%

== Economy ==
The inhabitants in this district are involved in the cultivation of wheat, sugar-cane, tobacco, cotton and grapes. They also participate in the breeding of cows, sheep, pigs and horses.
