= Ñumí =

- Ñumí
- Location within Paraguay
- Coordinates: 25°45′00″S 56°26′0″W
- Country: Paraguay
- Department: Guairá
- Founded: 1955

Government
  - Intendente Municipal: Carmen Aurora Martín de Cabrera (PLRA)

Area
  - Total: 324 km^{2} (125 sq mi)

Population (2008)
  - Total: 3,637
  - Density: 11/km^{2} (28/sq mi)
- Time zone: -4 Gmt
- Postal code: 5280
- Area code: (595) (543)

Ñumí (Guaraní: Ñumi) is a district of the Guairá Department, Paraguay.

Ñumí is located to the south of the city of Villarrica, the capital of the department, and to the east of the San Salvador district. It is connected to both by wide roads. Is about 198 kilometers away from Asunción. You can get to this district following the Route 8 "Doctor Blas Garay".

The activities of the population are fundamentally agricultural. They also dedicate to the work of wood, although this last one has diminished lately.

== Geography ==
The zone of Ñumí consists of low prairies. This district has an area of 324 square kilometers with a population (2008) of 3,637 inhabitants. His population density is of 11 inhabitants per square kilometer.

- North: The city of Villarrica and the Ybytyruzú Cordillera.
- South: The Iturbe district.
- West: The San Salvador district.
- East: The Eugenio A. Garay district.

=== Hydrography ===
Through the Ñumí district flows the following streams:

- Yhacá Guazú.
- Remansito.

== Demographics ==
According to the main social-demographic indicators, the Ñumí district has:

- Population under 15 years old: 34.5%
- Average of kids per woman: 2.9 kids.
- Average of illiterate: 11.1%
- 59.3% of the working population dedicates to the primary sector, 11.2% to the secondary sector and 28.2% to the tertiary sector.
- Population working on agriculture: 59.3%
- Houses with electricity service: 91.6%
- Houses with water service: 19,9%

Population with unsatisfied basic needs in...

- Education: 9.5%.
- Sanitary infrastructure: 27.2%.
- Housing quality: 35.1%.
- Subsistence capacity: 17.1%.

According to the General Office of Statistics, Polls and Census, the percentage of the population in groups are:

- Population from 0 to 14 years old: 34.5%
- Population from 15 to 64 years old: 57.5%
- Population from 65 years old: 7.9%

From which 74.21% is settled in the rural area. And from the 3,637l inhabitants, 1,899 are males and 1,738 are females.

== Economy ==
The inhabitants in the Ñumí district are dedicated to the cultivation of wheat, sugar-cane, tobacco, cotton, and grapes.

== Roads and communication ==
His most important terrestrial communication is the Route 8 "Doctor Blas Garay", that connects it with the city of Villarrica, capital of the Department, and with Asunción and other locations of the department and the country. The other internal roads are terraced making easier the intercommunication between the districts.

Has the telephonic services from Copaco and mobile telephony, besides various communication media and the journals from the capital of the country.

== Transportation ==
The district have modern buses to travel to the capital of the country and to the other departments. To the internal trips have buses of less capacity.

== How to get there ==
From Asunción you have to follow the Route 2 "Mariscal José Félix Estigarribia" until the city of Coronel Oviedo. There taking the detour of the Route 8 "Doctor Blas Garay" you get to the Yataity district and the city of Mbocayaty, following the same route you get to the city of Villarrica, capital of the department, and traveling 22 kilometers to the south you get to Ñumí.

== Tourism ==
The natural beauties of the place are ready for rural tourism and wild safaris.

In the district are located the hill Cerro Corá with an altitude of 435 meters and the Ybytyruzú Cordillera that branches from the Caaguazú Cordillera, one of the most important of the Paraguay. His sides shown a vegetation that is worth to admire.

== Patronal celebration ==
Every June 10 is celebrated the Patronal Celebration honoring his saint patron Sacred Heart of Jesus. His image is in the church with the same name.

The festivities starts with the novena every afternoon and the gala party in the municipal shed the 9th.

The 10th at 8 in the morning celebrates a Mass with the district's priest, followed by a procession with a little band and at the noon a barbecue with ridings and bullfights in the afternoon.
