= Paraguayan wine =

Wine making in Paraguay

Paraguay is one of the countries of South America that produces wine. However, Paraguay does not have active wine exports as of 2024 and its wine is little known outside its country of origin.

== History ==
Paraguayan wine history falls into three distinct chronological categories. In the mission period starting in the late 16th century, Spanish-speaking Jesuit missionaries planted European grapes (vitis vinifera) as part of the cultural goal of creating a self-sufficient Christian community. Following Paraguayan independence in the early 19th century, winegrowing died out as the country turned to other beverages, such as yerba mate and beer, and its demand for sacred wine was filled by imports. In 1908 Carlos Voigt, a winegrower of German heritage, began growing grapes in the province of Guiará. This marked the rebirth of the Paraguayan wine industry.

== See also ==
- Winemaking
- Agriculture in Paraguay
- Paraguayan culture
