= Félix Pérez Cardozo =

Paraguayan musician (1908–1952)

- Born: Félix Pérez Cardozo; 20 November 1908; Hyaty, Paraguay
- Died: 9 June 1952 (aged 43); Buenos Aires, Argentina
- Known for: Composer, Music.
- Notable work: "Ángela Rosa"; "Guyrá Campana"; "Carreta Guy"; "Despedida"; "El sueño de Angelita"; "Llegada"; "Rosa"; "Tren lechero"; "Los 60 Granaderos"

Félix Pérez Cardozo (20 November 1908 – 9 June 1952) was a Paraguayan harpist and composer. After growing up and learning to play the harp in the Paraguayan countryside, he played in bands in Asunción and Buenos Aires, Argentina before forming his own group. He introduced Paraguayan music to a wider audience and gained public recognition and fame, particularly in Buenos Aires and the Río de la Plata area. He designed a thirty-six string harp for his song "Pájaro campana" (The Bell Bird), which would go onto become the most popular harp configuration.

== Early life ==
Pérez Cardozo was born in the small town of Hyaty in the Guairá Department, the son of Teodoro Pérez and Cándida Rosa Cardozo.

== Career ==
As is common among musicians of the Paraguayan countryside, Pérez Cardozo learned how to play the harp from other harpists, without seeking tutelage from any one master.

He was part of a paradigmatic trio, along with Ampelio Villalba and Diosnel Chase, consisting of one harp and two guitars. He received support from the poet Pedro José Carlés, with whom he traveled to the Paraguayan capital, Asunción, in 1928. At that time, they played at folk music festivals organized by Aristóbulo "Nonón" Domínguez in the "Teatro Granados", as well as in night clubs.

In 1931, Pérez Cardozo and his band left for Buenos Aires, Argentina, where most of his artistic career took place. They were the first of a long list of Paraguayan musicians that would find success in the Argentine capital for more than half a century.

In a short period of time, the individualistic style of Pérez Cardozo's interpretations of various compositions quickly gained him wide public recognition. He was a member of several bands until he formed his own group in 1945. He enjoyed huge fame in Buenos Aires and throughout all Río de la Plata area.

In 1949, Pérez Cardozo asked Epifanio López to design a diatonic harp with additional strings, which would allow Pérez Cardozo to play his composition Pájaro campana (The Bell Bird), one of Paraguay's most famous folk songs. This thirty-six-string harp would become the most popular harp configuration.

== Personal life ==
Pérez Cardozo married Argentinian, Victoria Sanchez, with whom he had three children.

== Death and legacy ==
Pérez Cardozo died on 9 June 1952, in Buenos Aires, Argentina. Atahualpa Yupanqui, a fundamental icon of inspirational folk music and poetry in this century in Argentina, sang "Canción del arpa dormida" in his honor (set to music by Herminio Giménez).

In 1957, his hometown of Hy'aty was renamed Félix Pérez Cardozo, in his honour. A street in Mendoza is also named for him.

Perez Cardozo has been described as Paraguay's "most influential harpist-composer" and one of "[t]wo of the most famous arpistas from Paraguay". The thirty-six-string harp that he designed has since become the most popular harp configuration.

== Works ==
Pérez Cardozo wrote music for various verses of distinguished poets such as:

- Víctor Montórfano ("Tetagua sapukái", a true anthem in which "grito del pueblo" (the shout of the people) claims better days for Paraguay)
- Antonio Ortiz Mayans ("Burrerita", "Pasionaria", "Puntanita", "Asunceña" y "Taperé")
- Félix Fernández ("Rosa"), Rigoberto Fontao Meza ("El arriero"), Andrés Pereira ("Mariposa mi")
- the Argentine Hilario Cuadros ("Los sesenta granaderos", known throughout Argentina as a very popular Anthem); also
- the most important poet of Paraguayan history Emiliano R. Fernández, whose piece is seen as a pillar of Paraguayan epic music due to the rhythmic power, melodic beauty and patriotic content of the following texts ("1º de Marzo", "Che la reina (Ahama che china)", and the lovable song ("Oda pasional", "Oñondiveminte"), ("Desde la selva" y "Primavera"). Likewise "Caaguy ryakua", "Isla Pukú", the recompilation of "Jaha che ndive", "Lui ryevu", "Misiones".

Among Pérez Cardozo's greatest harp compositions are:

- "Angela Rosa"
- "Carreta guýpe", (debajo de la carreta)
- "Che vallemi Hyaty"
- "Che vallemi Yaguarón"
- "El sueño de Angelita"
- "En tí hallé consuelo"
- "El Tren Lechero"
- "Guyra campana" also known as "Pájaro campana"
- "Jataity"
- "Llegada"
- "Los 60 Granaderos"
- "Mi despedida"
- "Pájaro campana" (The Bell Bird), described as "one of his most celebrated concert pieces" also known as "Guyra campana"

== See also ==
- List of harpists

== Bibliography ==
- Diccionario Biográfico "FORJADORES DEL PARAGUAY", Primera Edición Enero de 2000. Distribuidora Quevedo de Ediciones. Buenos Aires, Argentina.
- Lorenzo Manlio Paris (2008) "Félix Perez Cardozo, su vida y su música" Editorial ServiLibro, Asunción, Paraguay ISBN 9789995301002
- Luis Szaran (2007) Diccionario de la Música Paraguaya" Edicción de la Jesuitenmission, Nuremberg, Germany
