= Cerro Tres Kandú =

Highest mountain in Paraguay

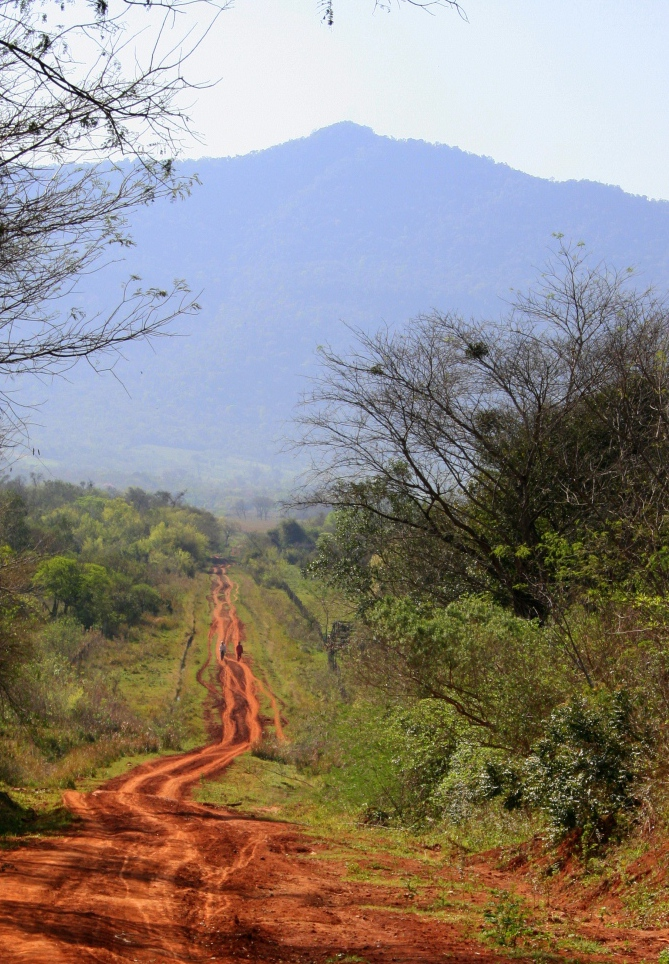

Highest point
- Elevation: 842 m (2,762 ft)
- Listing: Country high point
- Coordinates: 25°54′06″S 56°09′36″W

Geography
- Location within Paraguay
- Location: General Garay, Guairá Department, Paraguay
- Parent range: Ybytyruzú

Geology
- Mountain type: Hill

Cerro Tres Kandú (Tres Kandu in the Guaraní language) is the highest point in Paraguay, with an elevation of 842 meters (2,762 ft). It is located in the municipality of General Eugenio Garay, Guairá Department, in a hill range named Ybytyruzú.

This hill was important for the Armed Forces of Paraguay because it was a strategic location to place the army repeater or radio-link for their communication. The national electrical company (ANDE) had also mounted its radiocommunication repeater on this hill. Today these installations are abandoned.

== Gallery ==
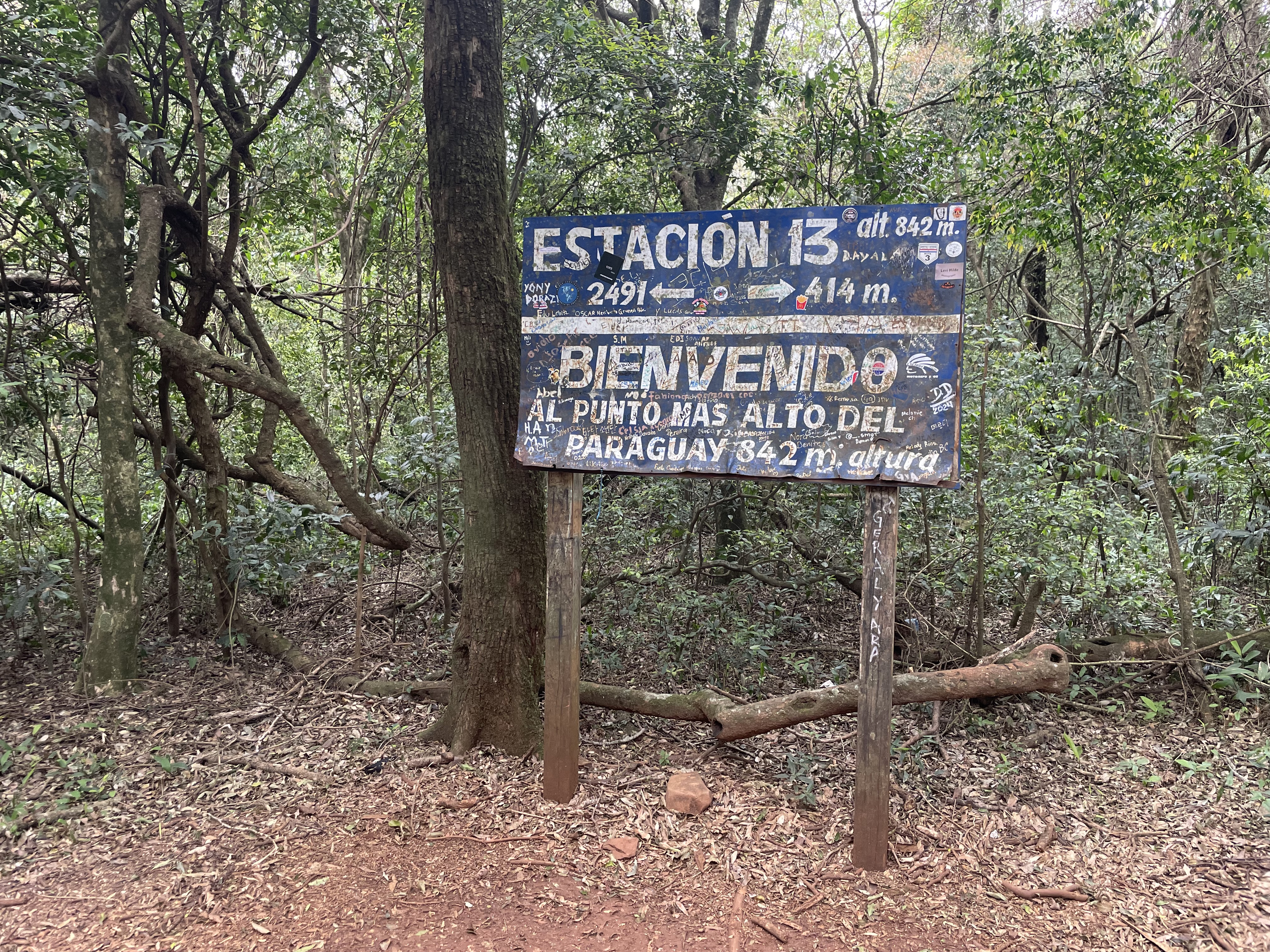
Sign at the high point

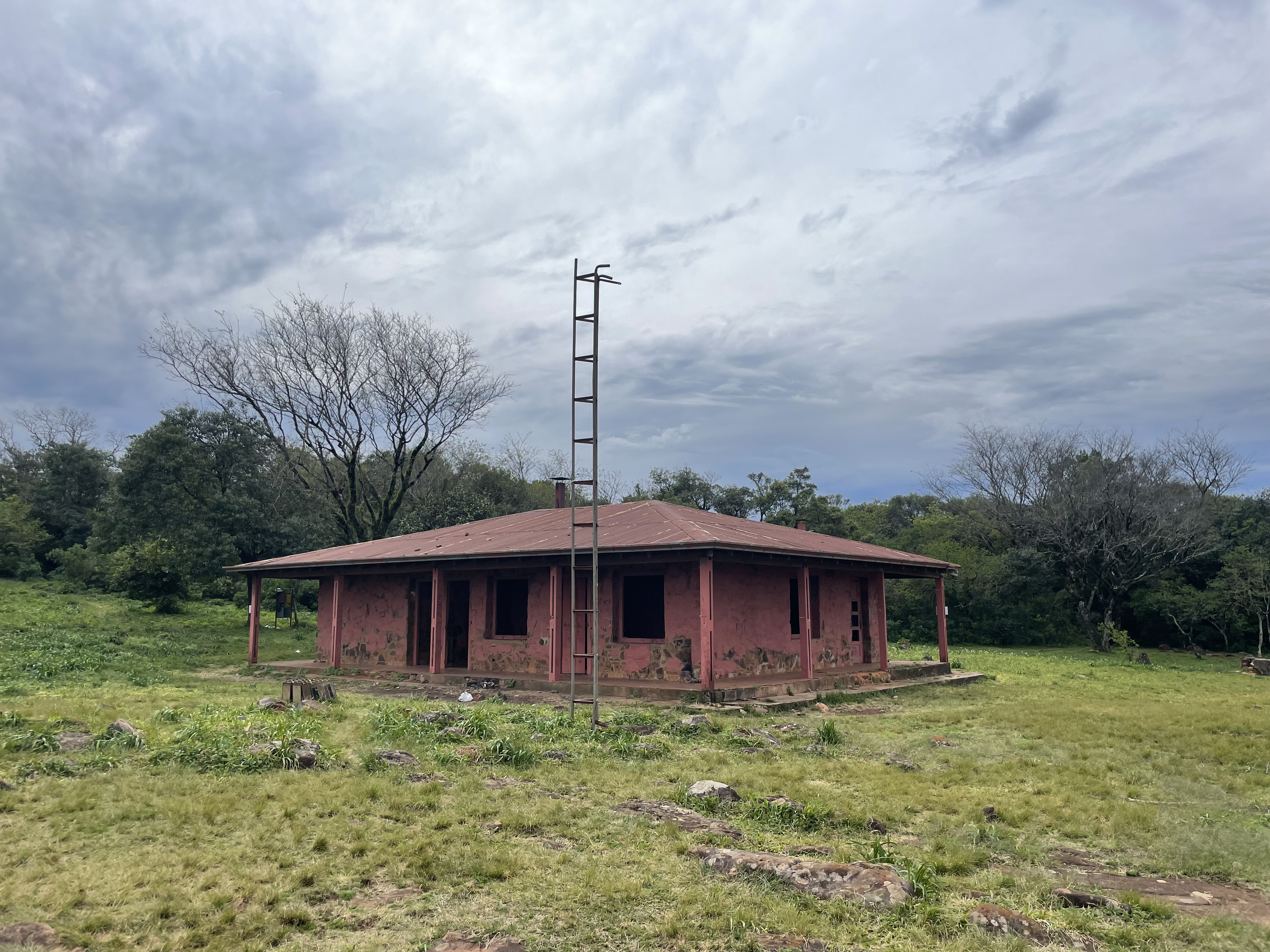
Abandoned buildings on the top of the hill

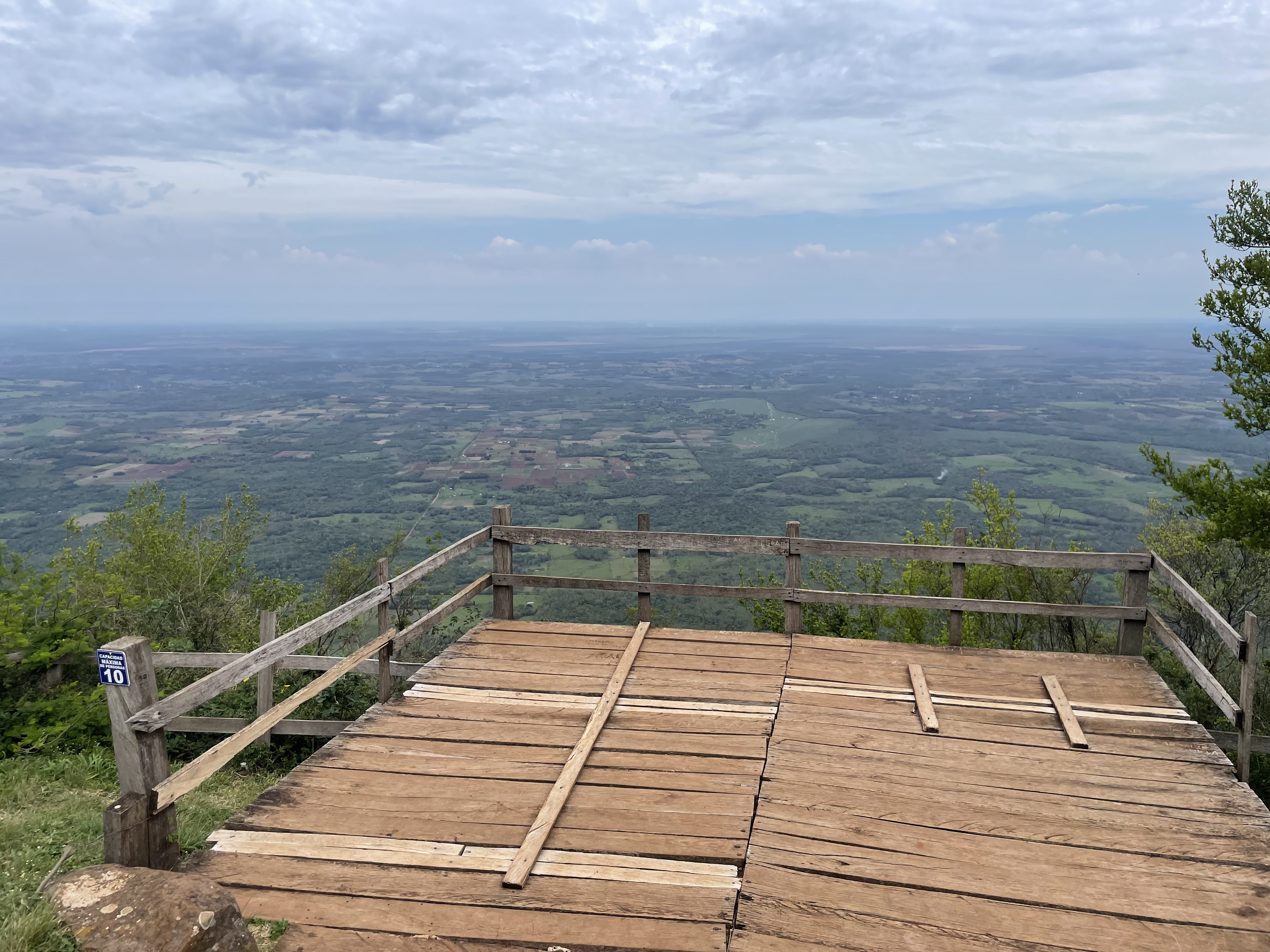
Overlook looking south

== See also ==
- Geography of Paraguay
- List of elevation extremes by country
