= Borja, Paraguay =

Borja Yhacanguazu
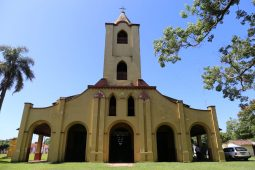
- Borja Church

- Location within Paraguay
- Coordinates: 25°57′10″S 56°29′50″W
- Country: Paraguay
- Department: Guairá
- Established: October 22, 1778

Population (2022)
  - Total: 10 596

Borja is a town in the Guairá Department of Paraguay. Located 25km to the South of Villarrica and 212km to the South East of Asuncion. Its main tourist attractions are two small waterfalls Salto Cristal and Salto Tupasy Ykua.

It was founded under the name of Yhacanguazu on October 22, 1778 by the Spanish Governor of Paraguay Pedro Melo de Portugal. The original name is in Guarani and it means large water spring. The current name of Borja was adopted in 1929 to honor Mateo Borja, a former resident. The main economic activity are sugarcane cultivation and subsistence livestock farming.

During Spanish rule in Paraguay (1535-1811) this area was part of a trackway known as the Royal Roads (Caminos reales) The roads were used by the Spanish authorities to visit the towns of Caazapá, Yuty, and Itapé.

A report from 1851 asserted that there were 4 schools in the town. During the Paraguayan War many local women donated their jewelry to help with the costs. After the war, by 1873 it was reported that there were six schools and 350 children of whom 341 were orphans.

According to the 2022 Census this district has a total population of 10,256 people. Only 298 people, or 3.2% of the total population, lives in the urban area.

== Location ==
It is located in the southwestern part of the Guairá department. Its urban area is located only 2 km away from the San Salvador urban area.

From Asunción you have to follow the National Route 2 until the city of Coronel Oviedo. There taking the detour of the Route 8 you get to the city of Villarrica, capital of the department, and 12 kilometers to the south and taking a non-asphalted road traveling 18 kilometers more you'll get to Borja.

== Notable people ==
- Andrés Rodríguez. President of Paraguay (1989 - 1993)
