= Félix Pérez Cardozo, Paraguay =

Félix Pérez Cardozo
- District
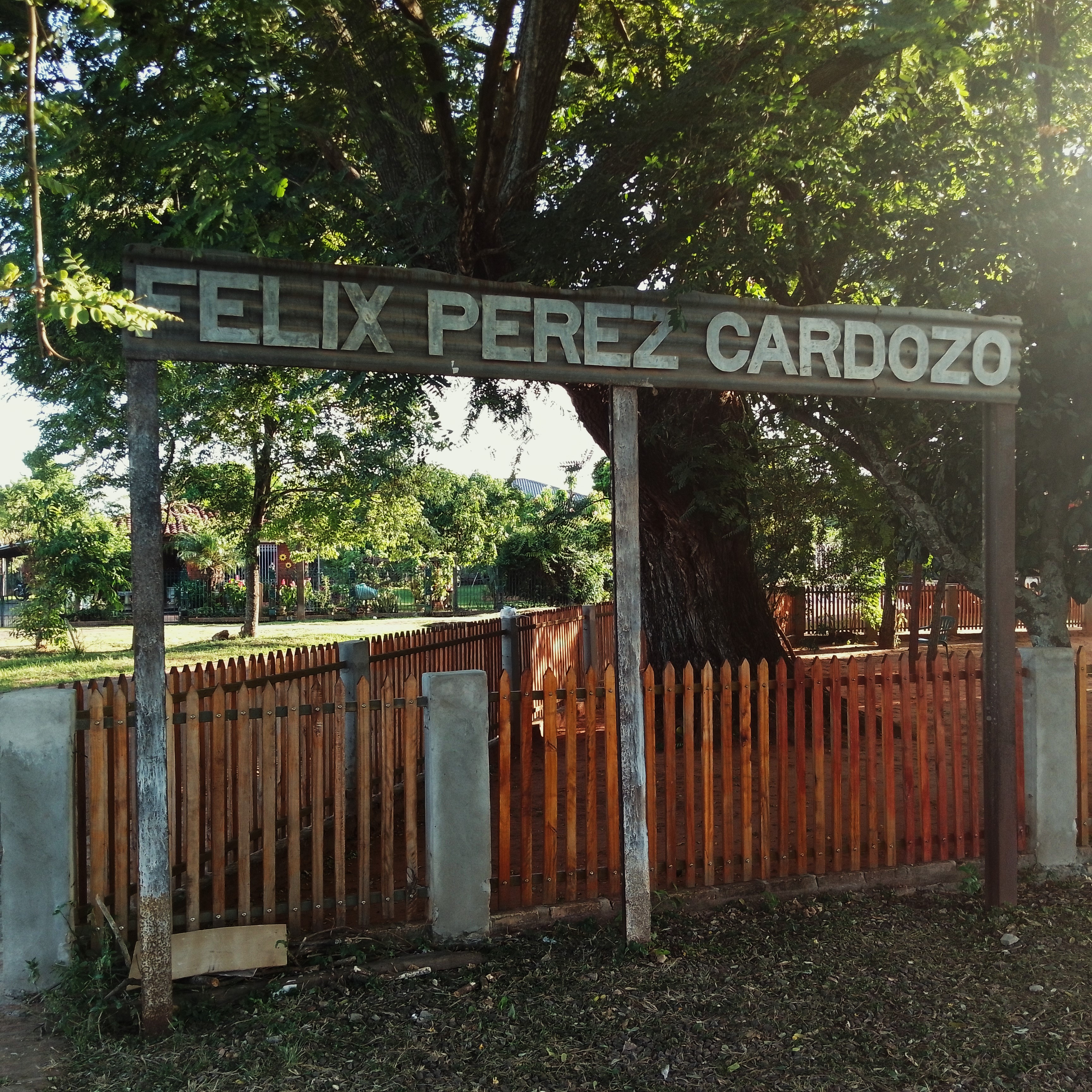
- Sign at the old train station

- Location within Paraguay
- Coordinates: 25°45′6″S 56°25′49″W
- Country: Paraguay
- Department: Guairá
- Foundation: 15 September 1773

Government
  - Intendente municipal: Carlos Adolfo Román Fernández

Area
  - Total: 159 km^{2} (61 sq mi)
- Elevation: 137 m (449 ft)

Population (2017)
  - Total: 6,156
- Time zone: -4 Gmt
- Postal code: 5150
- Area code: (595)
- Climate: Cfa

Félix Pérez Cardozo is a town and district located in the Guairá Department of Paraguay. It is located approximately 186 km (116 mi) from the national capital Asunción. In this town, its inhabitants are dedicated to the cultivation of sugar cane and tobacco, as well as crafts, especially Ao po'i embroidery.

== History ==
Félix Pérez Cardozo was founded by Governor Agustín Fernando de Pinedo on 15 September 1773; it was initially known by the name of Hyaty. In 1957, a decree by the Executive Branch changed the name of the town to Félix Pérez Cardozo in honor of the great Paraguayan harpist who was born in this place.

== Demographics ==
According to the data provided by the General Directorate of Statistical Surveys and Census, Félix Pérez Cardozo had a population of 6,156 inhabitants in 2017. Carrying out a relationship with the total population of the district, it had been apparent that 88.75% of the population resided in the rural areas.

== Transport ==
The district of Félix Pérez Cardozo is served by the two highways. The first one is a land path connecting the city to the district of Yataity. The other one is a paved path connecting the city of Villarrica to the city of Paraguarí (Paraguarí Department).
