= José Fassardi =

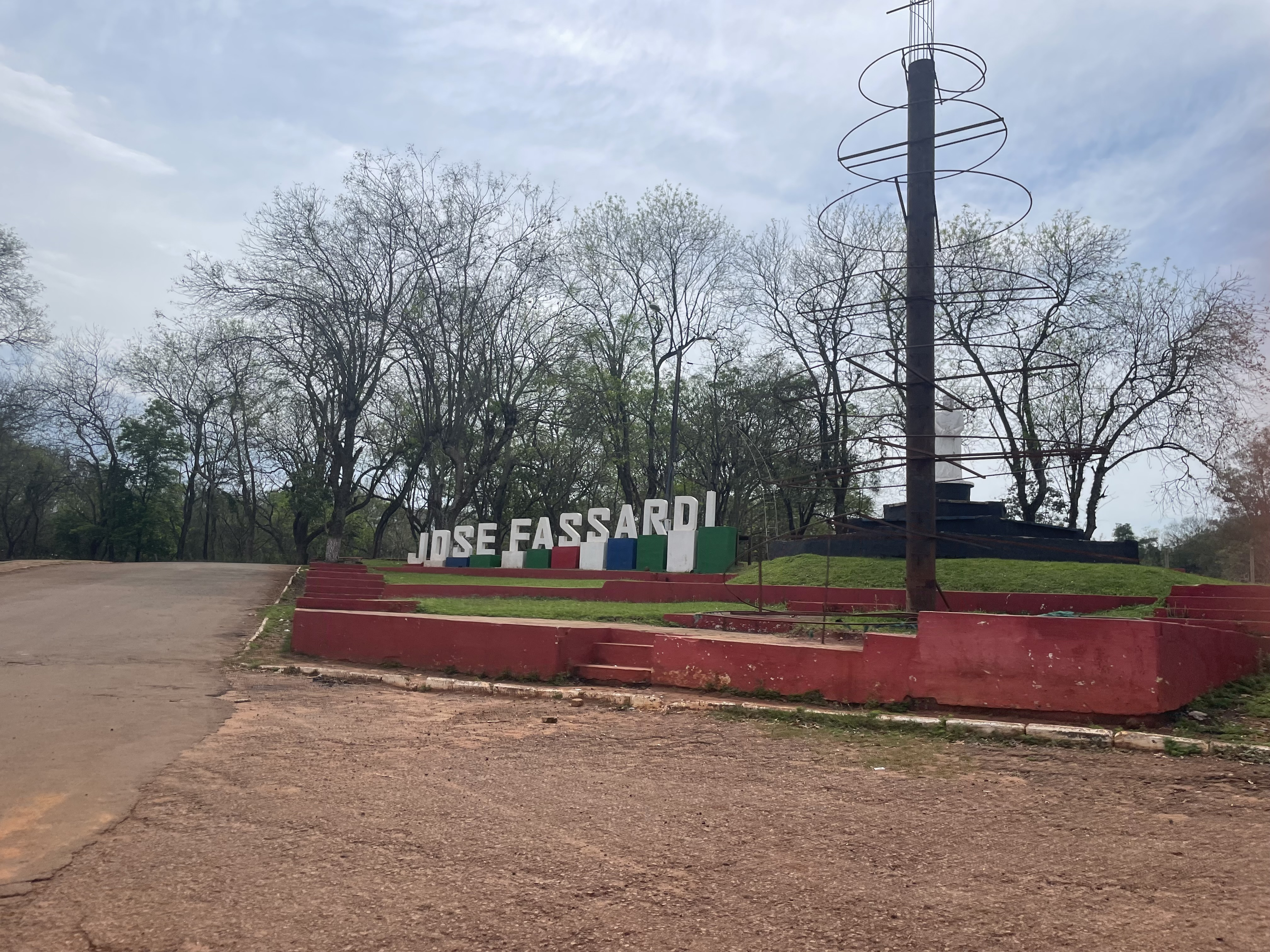
- Town Square in 2025

- Location within Paraguay
- Coordinates: 25°58′48″S 56°7′48″W
- Country: Paraguay
- Department: Guairá

Population (2008)
  - Total: 386

José Fassardi is a village and district in the Guairá Department of Paraguay.
