= Tebicuarymí River =

Tebicuarymi River
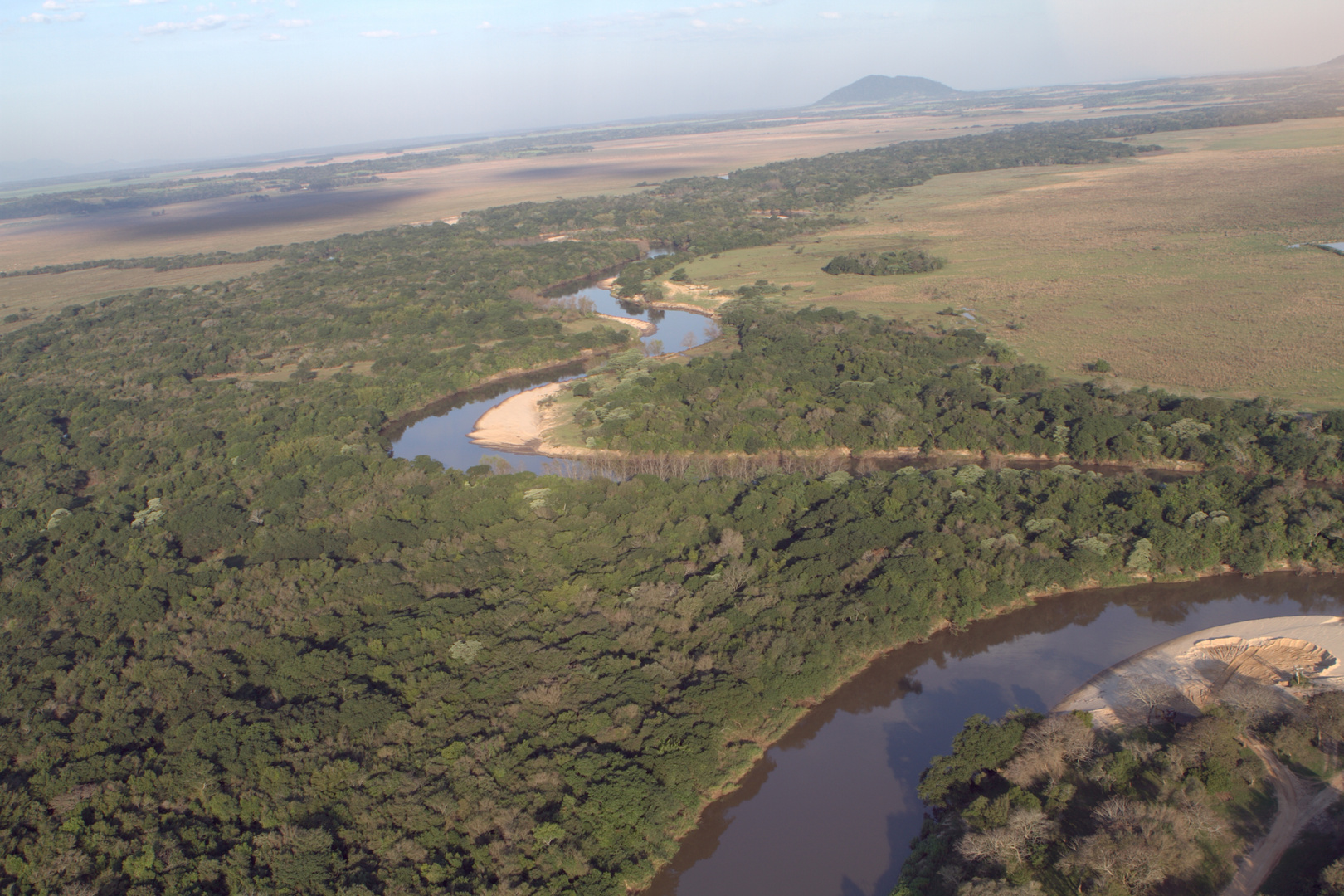
- Aerial view of the river at the town of Tebicuary

Location
- Country: Paraguay

Physical characteristics
- Source: Paso Yobai
- Mouth: Tebicuary River
  - coordinates: 26°32′27″ S, 56°50′52″ W
- Discharge
  - location: Confluence with Tebicuary River

The Tebicuarymí River (Spanish: Río Tebicuarymí) is a river in the Paraguarí Department of Paraguay. It is a tributary of the Tebicuary River, which itself is a tributary of the Paraguay River. The Tebicuarymí River faces challenges such as flooding during heavy rains and industrial pollution.

== Geography ==
The Tebicuarymí River makes up the upper portion of the Tebicuary River drainage basin, running from its source in the Ybytyruzú Mountains to its intersection with the Tebicuary at Villa Florida. The upper drainage basin has a surface area of 720,600 hectares and its human population is around 170,000, including many small farmers and some larger landowners.

== Challenges ==
Native wildlife of the Tebicuarymí River, including the fish species Pimelodus maculatus, Synbranchus marmoratus, Astyanax bimaculatus, and Hoplias malabaricus, have excessive levels of mercury due to nearby gold mining which began in 1996.

In 2015, local residents complained about waste dumping from sugar production in the area of the Tebicuarymí River. In 2016, criminal charges were filed against the general manager of Azucarera Paraguaya for allowing pollution of the Tebicuarymí River that resulted in fish kills.

In March 2019, flooding of the Tebicuarymí River displaced between 250 and 300 local residents. Flooding in 2022 caused shortages of freshwater due to overloading local water treatment capacity. Flooding of the Tebicuarymí River also has the potential to disrupt pilgrimages to the Marian devotion of Itapé, with thousands making the annual pilgrimage even during torrential conditions.

== See also ==
- List of rivers of Paraguay
- Tebicuary River
