= Guairá Department =

Department of Paraguay

Guairá Department Departamento de Guairá (Spanish) Tetãvore Guaira (Guarani)
- Department
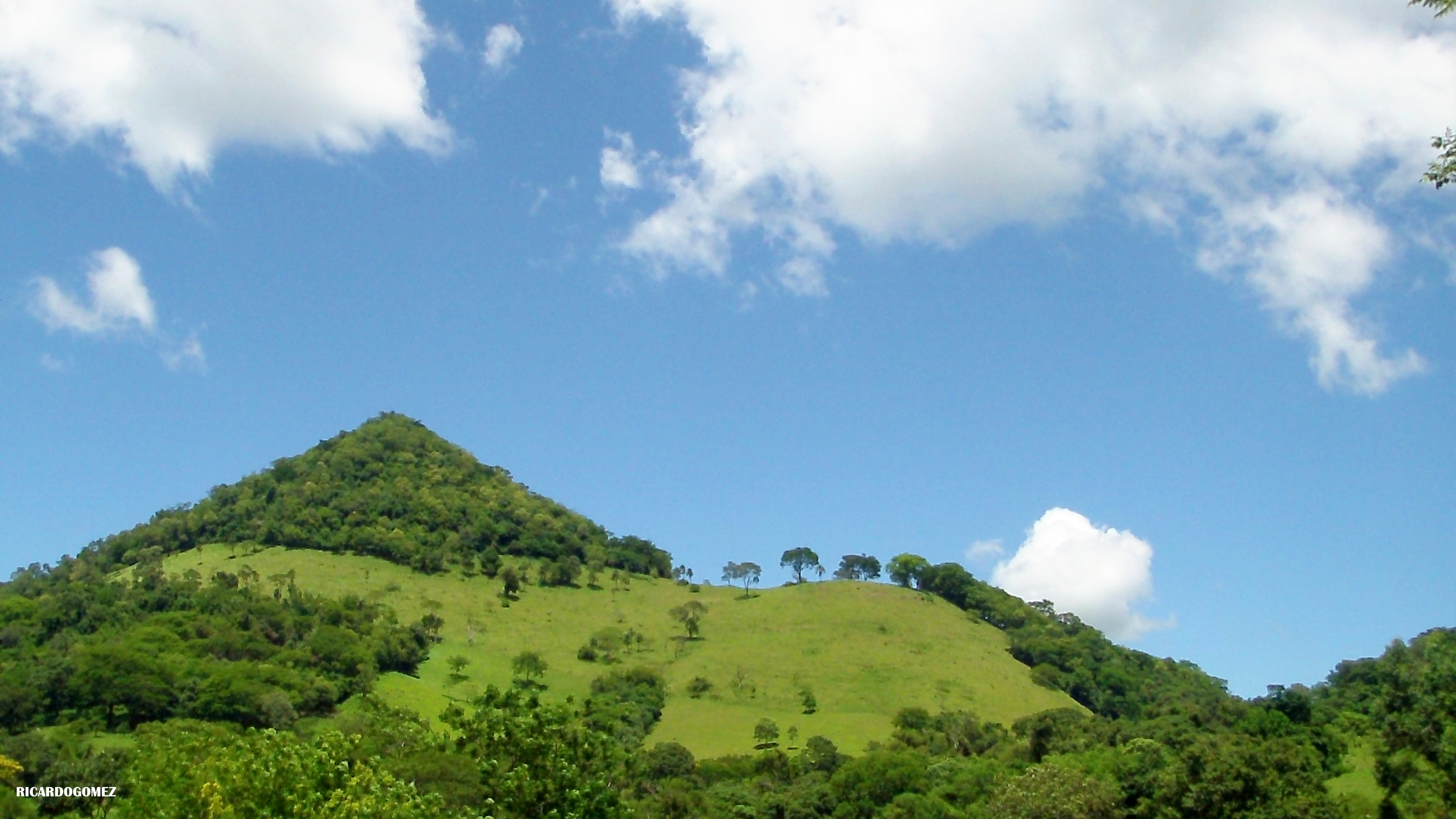
- Acati Hill

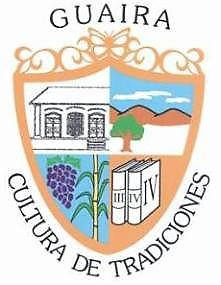
- Flag Coat of arms
- Motto: Cultura de Tradiciones (Spanish Culture of Traditions)
- Guairá shown in red
- Coordinates: 25°45′S 56°26′W
- Country: Paraguay
- Region: Eastern Region
- Established: 1906
- Capital: Villarrica
- Largest city: Villarrica

Government
  - Governor: César Sosa (ANR)

Area
  - Total: 3,846 km^{2} (1,485 sq mi)
  - Rank: 16

Population (2022 census)
  - Total: 179,555
  - Density: 46.69/km^{2} (120.9/sq mi)
- Time zone: UTC-03 (PYT)
- ISO 3166 code: PY-4
- Number of Districts: 17

Guairá Department (Spanish pronunciation: [gwajˈɾa]) is one of the seventeen departments of Paraguay. Its capital and most populous city is Villarrica. It is located to the southern half of the country and to the center of the Eastern Region. Guairá Department is the second smallest department of Paraguay after Central and the fourth most densely populated after Central, Alto Paraná and Cordillera. It was created in 1906.

== Name origin ==
The name Guairá comes from the guarani words: guay + ra. The suffix ra means place but there is a dispute on the actual meaning of the term guay.

The first theory claims it is a contraction of the expression guara´ira that means `a person who will become a warrior` The second says guay is just similar to the ones of Uruguay, Paraguay or Gualeguay which all mean 'someone from the river'. Spanish conquistador Álvar Núñez Cabeza de Vaca reported that Guayra was the name of an indigenous chief.

== History ==
Before the arrival of the first Spanish explorers, what is now Guairá was populated by an indigenous tribe named Paranaygua. The Paranaygua were a warlike tribe of keen fishermen within the larger Tupi-Guarani family. The first Europeans to explore the territory of Guairá were the Spanish, but they were unsuccessful in their colonization attempts due to the hostility of the Paranaygua.

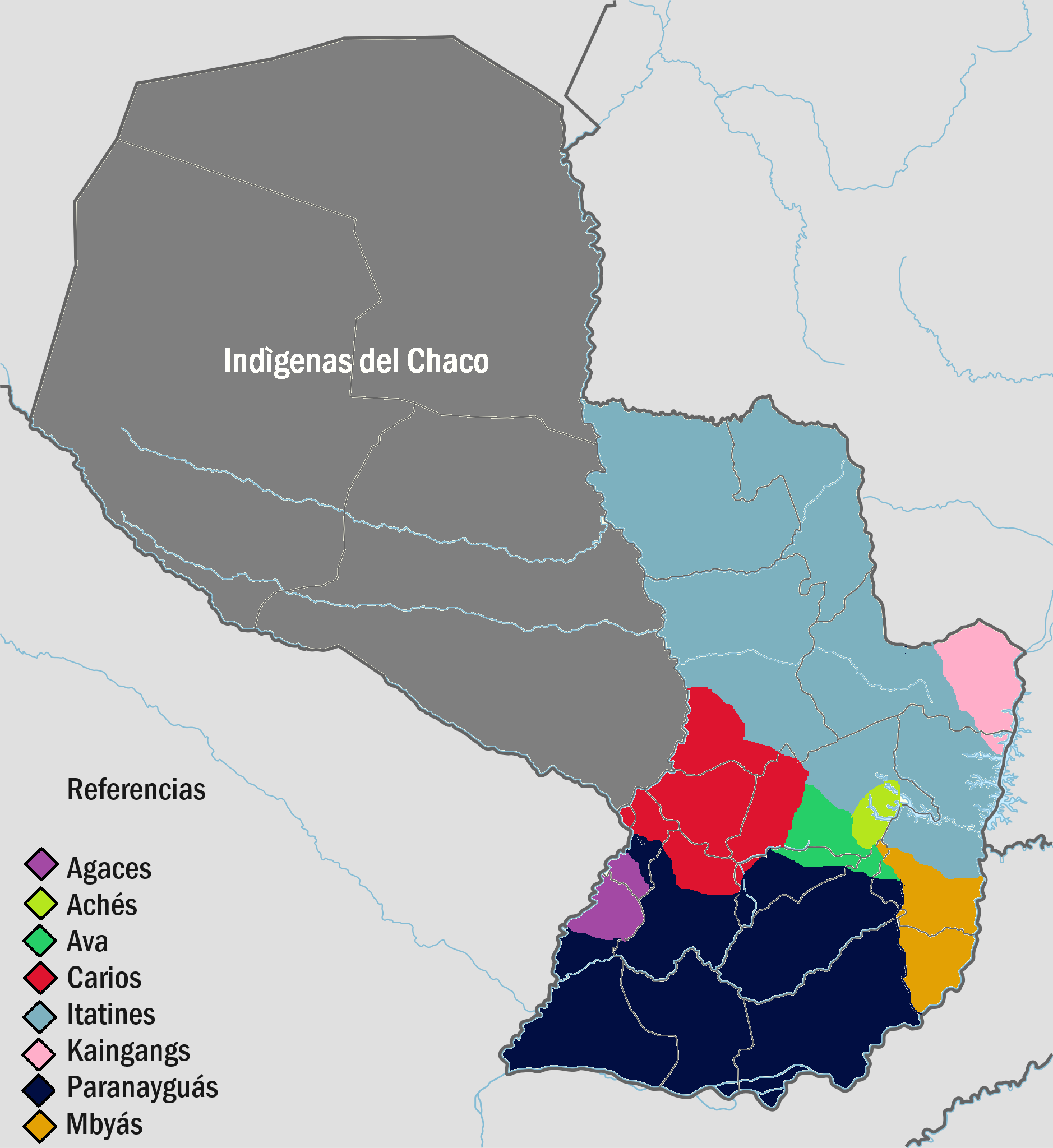
Area occupied by the Parana tribe within Paraguay (dark blue)

One of the first Christians to enter the current territory of Guairá under Paranaygua rule was Mestizo franciscan friar Juan Bernardo Colman. Colman was thought to be a spy for the Spaniards and was executed that same year by the natives. In 1607, another franciscan priest named Luis de Bolaños had better results and managed to settle the town of Caazapá as an Indian mission. With this achievement, the area of what is now Guairá became part of the large region of Caazapá that used to comprise most of the south of Paraguay. From 1617 to 1678 there was not much progress in the settlement of new towns in the area until friar Buenaventura de Villasboa, apprentice of Bolaños, makes an expedition towards the east looking for more Indians to Christianize. Villasboa gathered a group of uncontacted guaranis and settled with them the mission of Ytapé in 1682. Later that same year, the pilgrims of the city of Villa Rica also settled nearby. These people called themselves guaireños because their city was originally founded in the extinct Spanish province of Guayrá.

Arms of Pedro Melo de Portugal, founder of one of the oldest settlements in Guairá (1778)

In 1773, Paraguay Spanish Governor Agustin de Pinedo founded a town named Hyaty to the northwest of Villarrica and in 1778, another Spanish Governor Pedro Melo de Portugal founded the town of Yhacanguazu this time to the southwest of Villarrica. By 1785, relatives of governor Juan Ortiz de Zarate owned land in what is now the town of Tebicuary and another Spaniard named Francisco del Monge started the settlement of current Coronel Martinez by donating part of his property to his former employees.

After the independence of Paraguay (1811), pioneers from Villarrica began to explore the surrounding areas looking for wood and more land to grow yerba mate. By this efforts new populated places emerged such as Mbocayaty, Yataity and Potrero Cosme.

After the end of the Paraguayan War in 1870, the region was briefly occupied by the Brazilian Army and in 1889 the first railway passengers arrived to the area in stations built in Villarrica, Borja and a number of unexplored sites that later became towns such as Fassardi and Garay. The railway increased the commerce and helped with the development of small industries. In 1906, the new department of Guairá was created including the municipalities of Villarrica, Mbocayaty, Yataity and Hyaty.

== Location ==
The department is in the center and slightly to the south of the Eastern Region of Paraguay. It borders Caaguazu department to the north, Caazapa department to the south and to the east, and Paraguari department to the west.

== Municipalities ==
The department is divided in the following 18 municipalities.

1. Borja
2. Mauricio José Troche
3. Independencia
4. Coronel Martínez
5. Dr. Botrell
6. Félix Pérez Cardozo
7. General Eugenio A. Garay
8. Itapé
9. Iturbe
10. José Fassardi
11. Mbocayaty
12. Natalicio Talavera
13. Ñumí
14. Paso Yobai
15. San Salvador
16. Villarrica
17. Yataity
18. Tebicuary
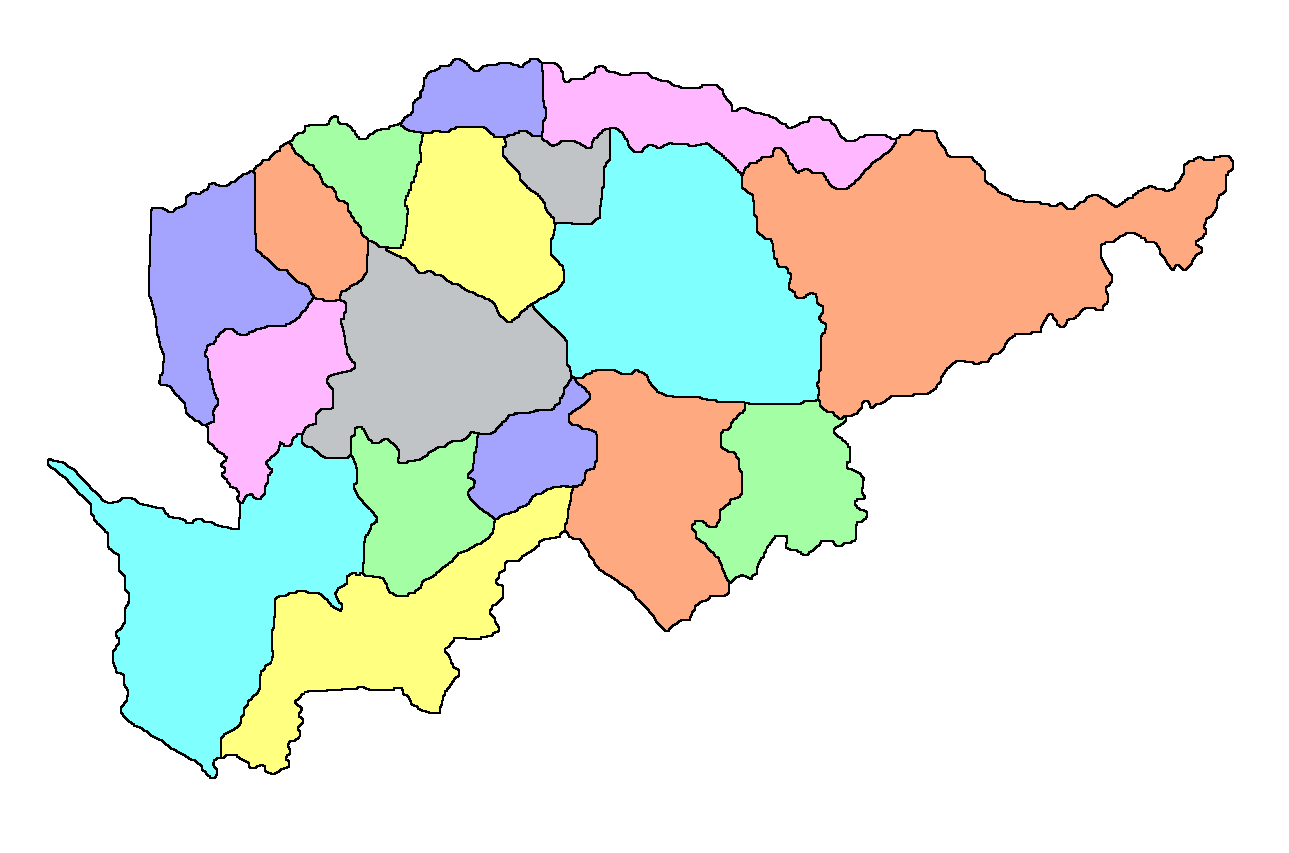

== Geography ==
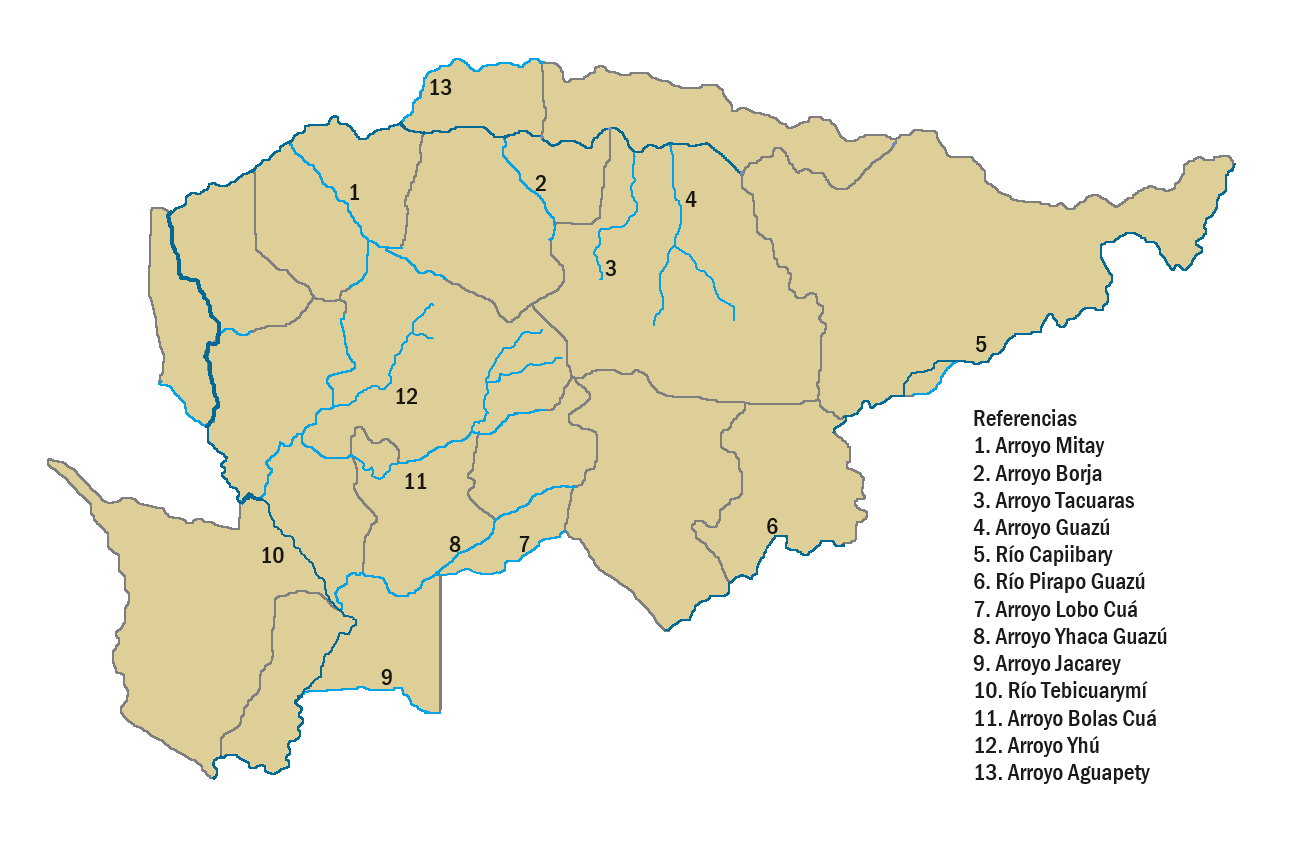
Hydrography of Guairá Department. Main tributary streams of Tebicuary River.

In the department there are three natural zones that are very well differentiated. The first zone, near the Villarica or Ybyturuzu, hills, there are high lands and forests that are woody with steep slopes. The second zone, the central west, has fertile lands. In the southwest part one can find the third zone, the most fertile and populated area. Its large plains are good for raising cattle. Besides the Ybyturuzu hills, we can also find the hills of Pelado, Polilla, Itape, Leon, Cerrito and Tres Kandú, with 848 m, the highest peak in the country.

Guairá Department is mainly irrigated by the Tebicuarymi River, a tributary of the Paraguay River and by a network of tributary streams such as Yhaca Guazu, Aguapety, Guazu, Yhu, Mitay, Cristalino and Tacuaras.

== Weather ==
The department has mild and good weather, with an average temperature of 21 degrees Celsius. In the summer, the maximum temperature is 38 degrees, and in the winter, the temperature goes down to 1 degree. It rains a lot during October and November. During the year, there is a total of 1,537 millimetres of rain.

== Demographics ==
Out of a total of 209,000 people in 2012, 41.4% lived in the urban area and 58.6% in the rural area. The only city with more than 50,000 people is Villarrica. Independencia and Paso Yobai are the second and third most populated places with over 20,000 people each.

== Flag and Arms ==
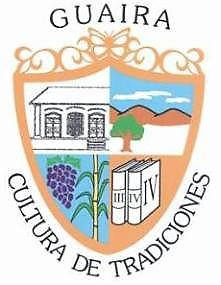
Arms of the Guairá Department

The flag is divided in two horizontal zones of similar dimensions. The upper zone, light blue, is related to the water and the sky; the lower zone, purple, represents the grapes and wine produced in the region but also the color purple represents the Catholic Church.

The shield is divided into four parts, where there is a typical colonial style house, and the zone's landscape, which includes the Ybyturuzu hills, grapes and sugar cane which are the main crops. There is also a book, with the Roman numerals corresponding to the number of the Guairá Department. In the center of the shield there is a butterfly that represents a poem of Manuel Ortiz Guerrero. At the bottom of the shield says "Culture of Traditions".

== Economy ==
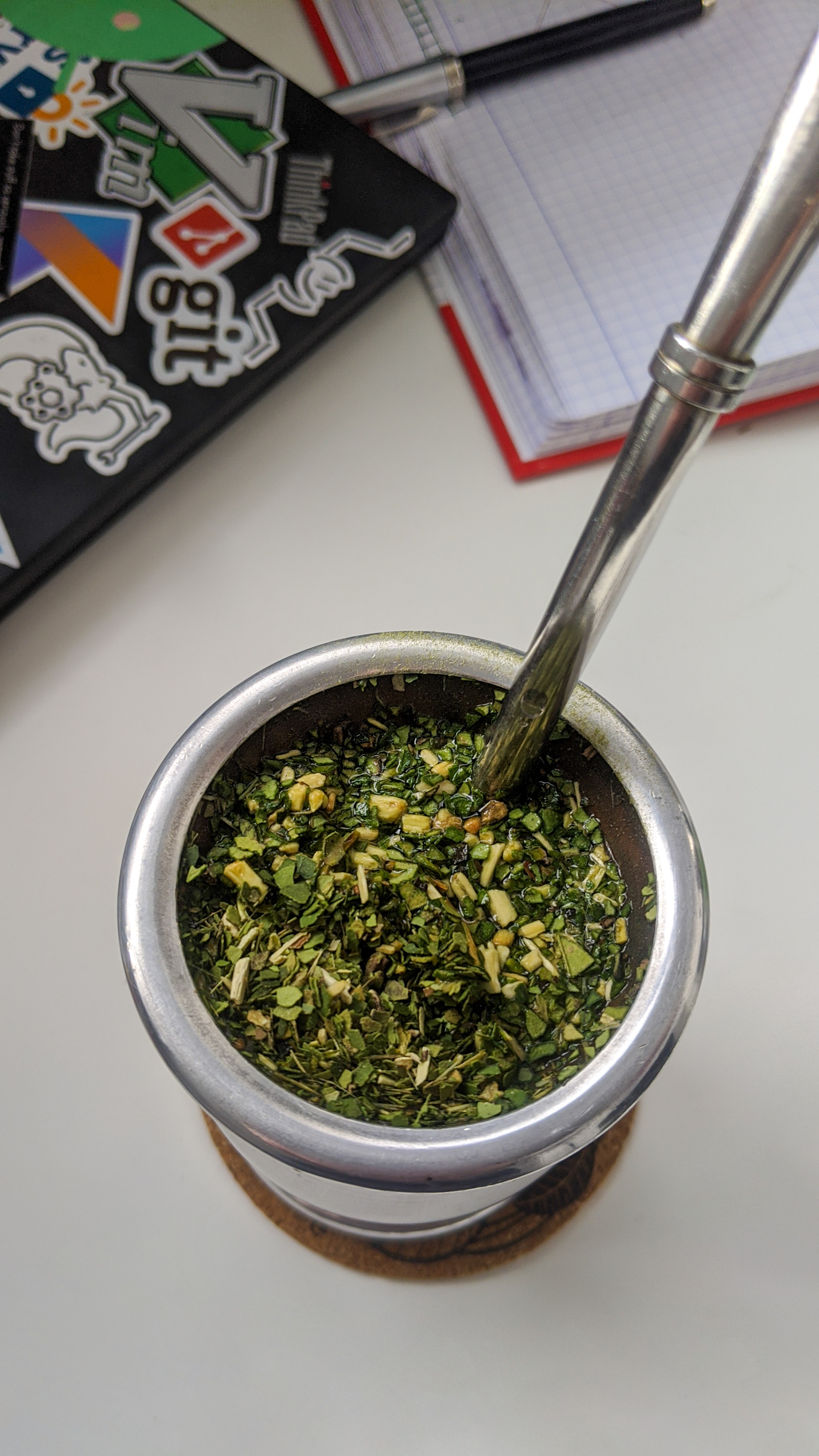
Guairá Department is the largest producer of yerba mate in Paraguay.

Guairá is a predominantly agricultural department. It is the country's largest sugar cane producer, with 41% of the national output. It is also the main producer of grapes and wine and the second producer of yerba mate. Other relevant crops are soybeans, maize and onions. Guairá Department also produces 8.5 kg of gold per month which is exported mainly to the US and Canada.

Deforestation has affected the wood industry, nevertheless, there are still several sawmills and workshops for furniture making. The main industries are a sugar factory in Tebicuary, an alcohol distillery in Troche, footwear and scale manufacturers in Villarrica and yerba mate producers in Paso Yobai and Independencia.

== Infrastructure ==
The Department contains the Number 8 Blas Garay Road, which starts in Coronel Oviedo from the Number 2 and 7 Roads, and is paved until Caazapa. From the Ñumi district there is another paved part that connects to San Juan Nepomuceno. It also has other paved roads: Villarica–Paraguari, through Felix Perez Cardozo and Coronel Martinez, Mbocayati-Independencia, with an extension of 50 km, and another way that connects the Number 7 Road through Natalicio Talavera, Troche and Colonia Blas Garay. Guairá Department also has aerial communication, telephones and telegraphs. There are many roads that cross the territory in all directions.

== Education ==
From the founding of the city of Villarrica del Espíritu Santo, work on education began and hasn't stopped since. Starting in 1585, the Franciscans opened a convent that they named Santa Barbara, and elementary and secondary schools were attached. In the 17th century, the Paraguay province had free courses in grammar, Philosophy and Sanctity in Asunción and Villarica, under the direction of the Franciscan, Dominican, Merced, and Jesuit priests

The first teaching center, sustained by the state of Villarica, dates back to 1859, and was named Escuela La Patria. Nowadays, the superior education in the department is represented by Universidad Católica "Nuestra Señora de la Asunción," and Universidad Nacional de Asunción in the north. In Guairá, there are many schools and institutes, private as well as public, such as Colegio Nacional, Colegio Ortiz Guerrero, Colegio Tecnico Vocacional, Seminario Diocesano, Escuela Regional de Agricultura, Instituto Professional Femenino, Escuela de Artes and Oficios Pio XII.

There are also various pre-school centers and Humanistic high schools, as well as Technical ones. Another educational entity is the Institute of Guaraní Linguistics, Idelguap, which teaches the Guarani language, literature, and folklore. There is also, with similar goals, the Ateneo of Guaraní Language and Culture and Guaraní Roga.

== Art and culture ==
The main city, Villarrica, is considered the largest city in the department. Among the social, cultural and sports entities, there are "The Porvenir Guaireño," " El Centro Español," "El Club de Leones," " Instituto de Cultura Hispánica," "Teatro Municipal," "Orquesta de Cámara," "Escuela Municipal de Danzas, Declamación, Oratoria, Guitar," "Asociación de Productores de Caña de Azúcar," "Liga Guaireña de Fútbol" y " Liga Guaireña de Basquetbol."

In 1970, the Socioeconomical Development Center of Guairá was created, formed by public and private entities, which supports the department's economic, social and cultural development. The Ybyturuzu Foundation, an environmental organization, attempts to spread consciousness throughout Guairá's population to keep, protect and defend the important ecosystem of the area.

In the city there are a few radio stations, closed circuit television, cable TV and channel 8. In terms of their intangible culture, the guireños keep a repertoire of different popular myths and legends, such as pora, pombero, jasy jatere, kurupi, urutau, karau, and jakare, among others. Among the European traditions, they have the patronal parties, day of the cross, corridas de toros, horse races, and riñas de gallos.

== Tourism ==
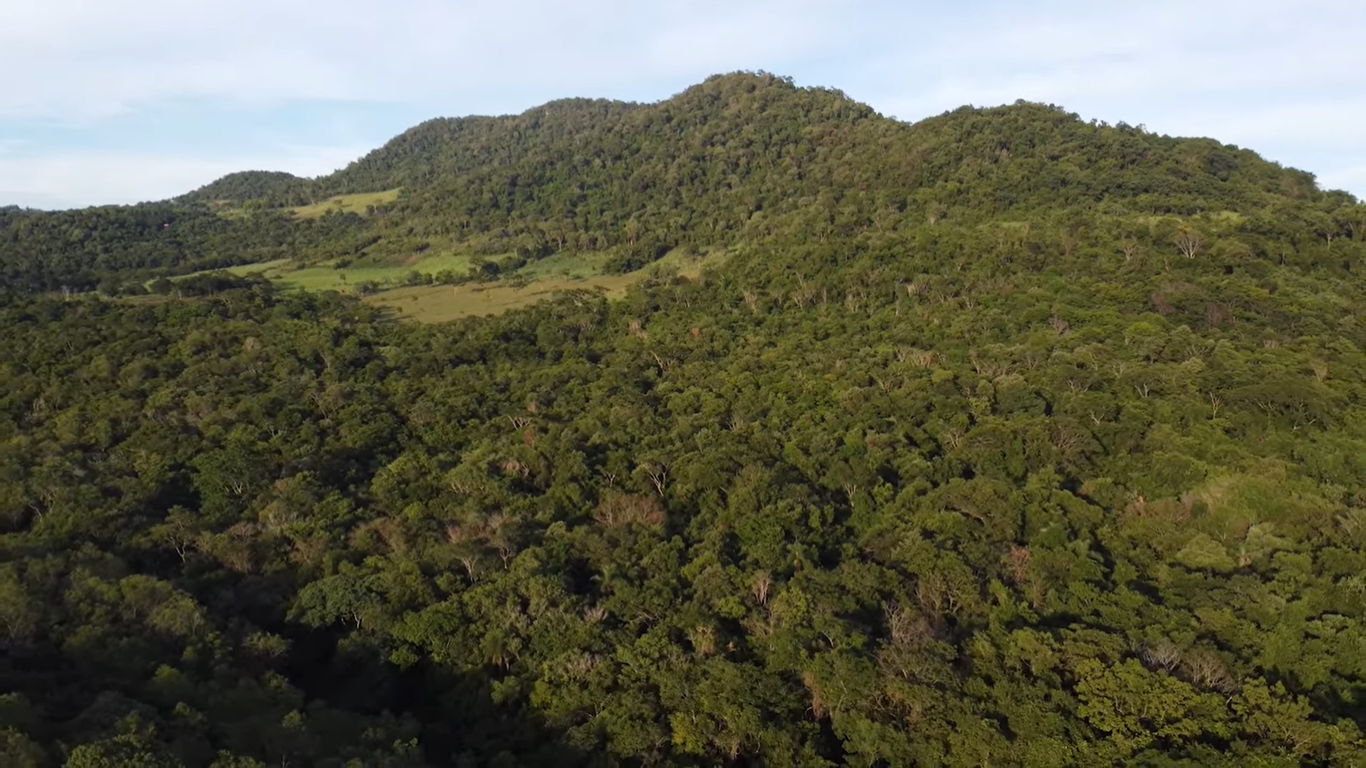
Ybytyruzu hills, frequently visited by campers and hikers.

Guairá has one of the most emblematic and representative cities of the Paraguayan culture: Villarica.

One of the most widely visited places in the city is the Manuel Ortiz Guerrero Park, which before 1936 was known as Ycua Pyta. The Manuel Oritz Guerrero Park is located in the northeast area of the city, between the Ybaroty and San Miguel neighborhoods.

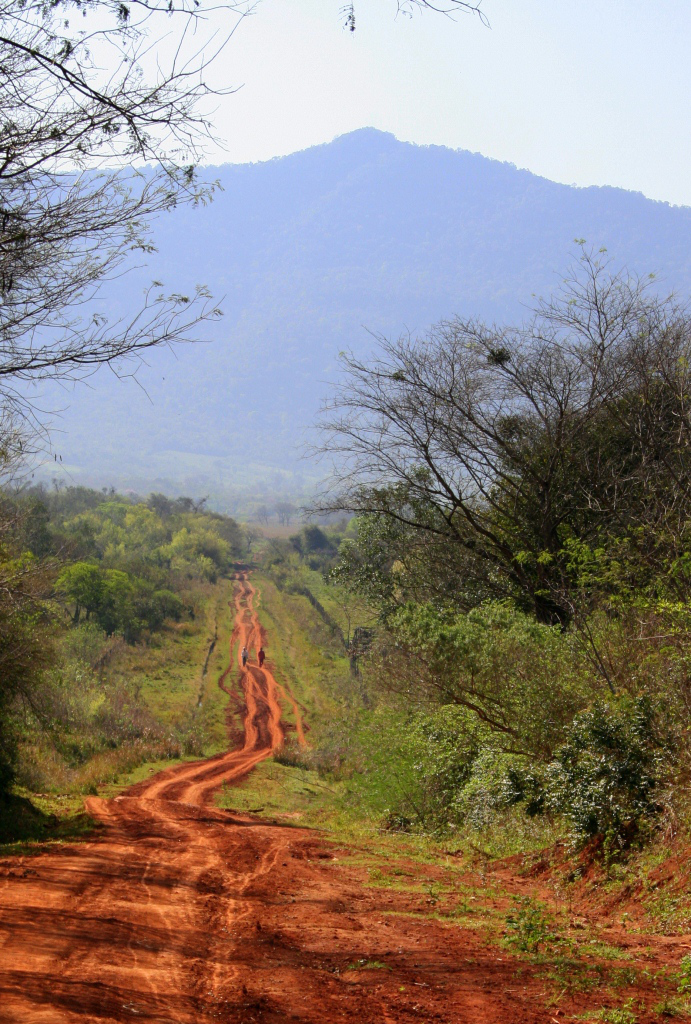
Dirtroad to Tres Kandu hill, the highest peak in Paraguay

At the beginning of the 1960s a sculpture was made by Javier Baez Rolon to commemorate a Villariquean poet. On May 8, 1983, for the 50th anniversary of the poet's death, his ashes were moved to the park, fulfilling the citizens' dream. From that day on, under the shadow of a tree, the poet has remained. His poetry still vibrates under the look of his beloved Ybytyruzu.

Other cultural centers are the Maestro Fermin Lopez Museum and the Library, where one can find the personal belongings of Natalicio Talavera, Fermin Lopez, and Manuel Ortiz, as well as weapons from the Chaco War, a collection of coins and Paraguayan bills, and arrows and axes made by the native peoples. In the museum one can see, among others, very old objects, old furniture, old machines, paintings, photographs, and different sacred art donated by the Church of Villarica. In the district of Itape there is a sacred place named the "Paso de la Virgen," whose festival is celebrated on December 18. Its sanctuary on the side of the Tebicuary-mi River is visited by thousands of pilgrims during the year.

Another tourist attraction is the Cristal Waterfalls, which are 43 meters high. Below the waterfalls there are many different colored fish, and a beautiful forest surrounding them. On the Tororo hill one can see runic inscriptions, said to be from the Vikings from the Pre-Columbian times. Lovers of the ao poi embroideries can enjoy beautiful samples in the Mbocayaty and Yataity districts.

== Notable people ==
- Natalicio Talavera (1839–1867), poet and journalist
- Manuel Ortiz Guerrero (1899–1933), poet and musician
- Félix Pérez Cardozo (1908–1953), harpist and composer
- Efraím Cardozo (1909–1973), politician and historian
- Nadia Ferreira (born 1999), model and beauty pageant titleholder

== Bibliography ==
- Geografía Ilustrada del Paraguay. Tercera Edición. Distribuidora Quevedo de Ediciones. Buenos Aires.1998.
- Atlas y Geografía de Paraguay y el Mundo. Ediciones India Guapa. Asunción. 1997.
- Atlas Paraguay. Cartografía Didáctica. Fausto Cultural Ediciones. Enero 2000.
- Franco Preda, Artemio. El Guairá y su aporte a la cultura paraguaya. Editora Litocolor S.R.L. Asuncion, 2003
