= Coronel Martínez =

- Location within Paraguay
- Coordinates: 25°45′36″S 56°37′12″W
- Country: Paraguay
- Department: Guairá

Population (2008)
  - Total: 1 400

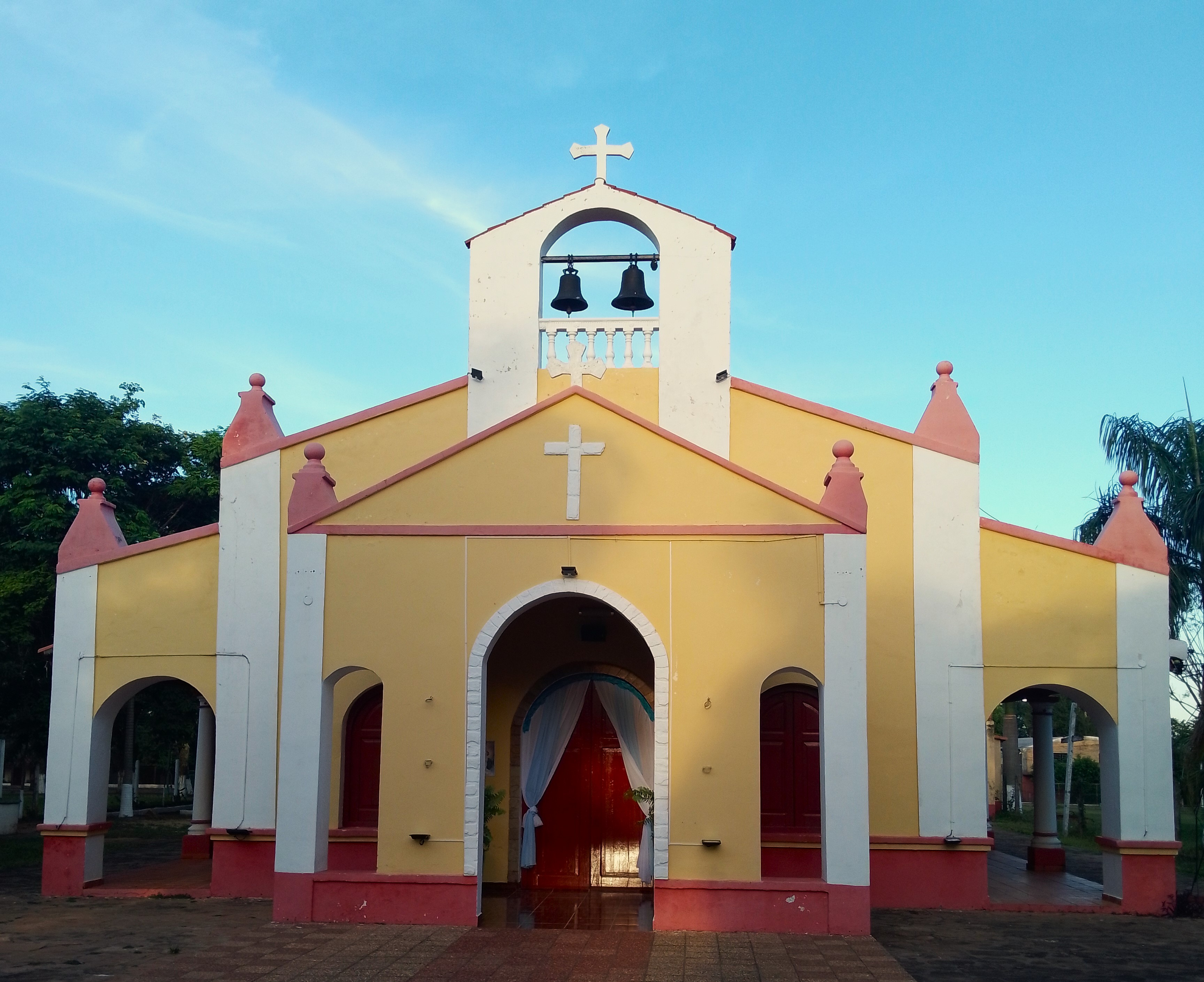
Catholic church facing the central plaza in the municipality of Martinez, Guaira

Coronel Martínez is a town in the Guairá Department of Paraguay.

== Sources ==
- World Gazeteer: Paraguay – World-Gazetteer.com
