= Colonia Independencia =

Independencia
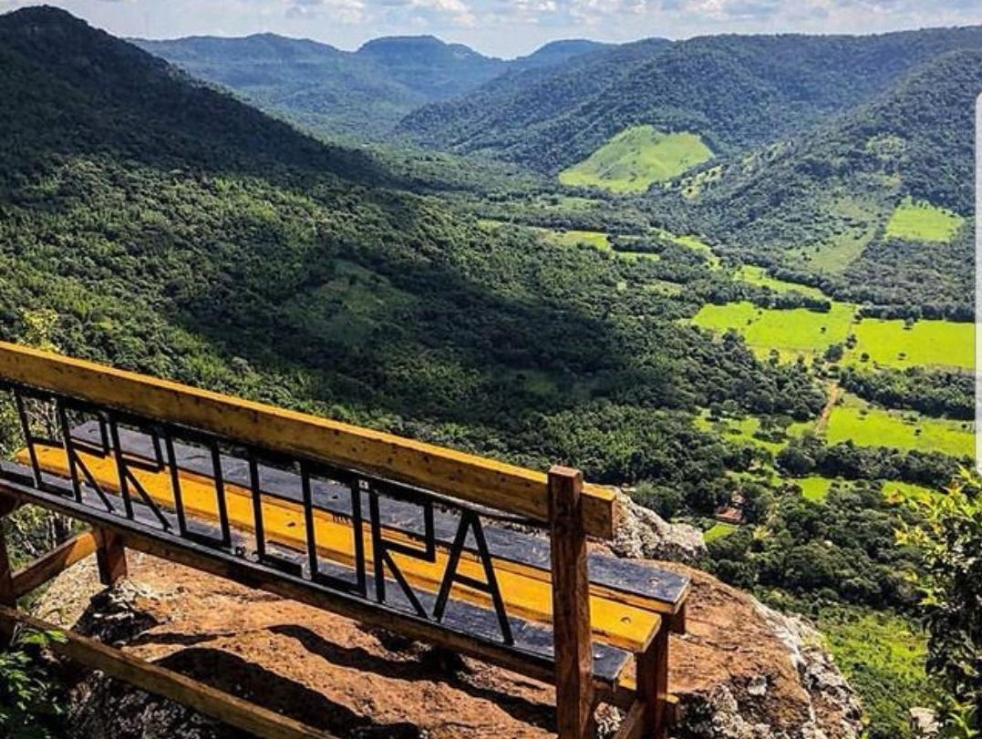
- View from the top of the hill Cerro Cora

- Location within Paraguay
- Coordinates: 25°43′12″S 56°15′0″W
- Country: Paraguay
- Department: Guairá
- Established: 1919

Government

Population (2022)
  - Total: 25 000

Independencia (formerly known as Colonia Independencia) is a town and district in Guairá Department of Paraguay.

The first known inhabitants of the area were indigenous peoples of the Mbya and Guayaki tribes. The area was originally known as Muvevo, which is the name the natives gave to a plant they used to smoke using pipes. Upon the arrival of Paraguayan nationals and other settlers it got the name of Kuruzupe (in jopara flat cross), due to a coffin shaped like a cross brought by a German family. Later it was called Campo Melgarejo (in Spanish Fields of Melgarejo) after Conrado Melgarejo, an entrepreneur from Villarrica. It was established on January 17, 1920, as a hamlet belonging to the town of Mbocayaty with the name of Colonia Independencia Nacional (Spanish for 'National Independence Colony').

The establishment was organized by public servant Genaro Romero from the city of Concepción. Romero was also a journalist and an advocate for the rights of Paraguayan agricultural workers. On June 23, 1955, the colony was upgraded to an self-governing municipality and its original area included that of the neighboring town of Paso Yobai.

The town is a tourist attraction because of its German heritage, specially in the month of October for its big Oktoberfest celebration and the natural sites surrounding the hills of Ybytyruzu.

Colonia Independencia received immigrants during the beginning of the 20th century especially after World War I from the German states of Baden-Wurttenberg and Bavaria but also to a lesser extent other German-speakers from Austria, Switzerland, and Hungary.

== Roads ==
The town is connected by PY10 to the national routes system.

== Sources ==
- World Gazeteer: Paraguay – World-Gazetteer.com
