= Tebicuary =

Coordinates: 25°46′45″S 56°38′52″W

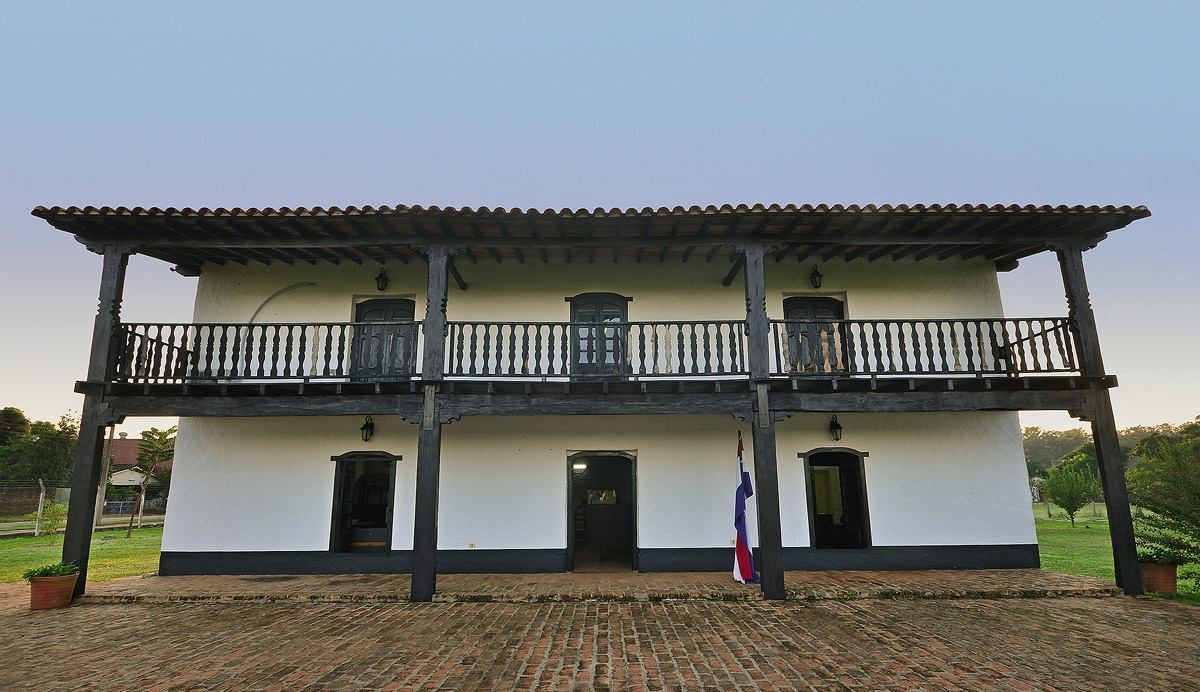
- Tebicuary City Hall

- Location within Paraguay
- Country: Paraguay
- Department: Guairá

Population
  - Total: 2,639

Tebicuary is a district in the Guairá Department of Paraguay. It is located 132 km to the southwest of Asuncion and 30 km to the west of Villarrica. In 2008, it became a district being disengaged from neighboring Coronel Martínez. It is the most recently created district in the Guairá Department. The first mayor was the businessman Juan Bosch Beynen.

== History ==
The name Tebicuary derives from the Guarani language expression Teyikuera which is a possible reference to the tribes named Teyy. The Teyy people used to inhabit the current departments of Misiones and Paraguarí. In this area runs a river also named Tebicuary which is a tributary of the Paraguay River. As the Spanish conquistadors mispronounced the name of the tribe, the original Guarani name evolved into the current spelling.

According to her 1779 will, Juana Ortiz de Zarate, mestiza daughter of Spanish conquistador and governor Juan Ortiz de Zárate was mentioned as a resident in an estate located in the Partido of Ybytymini. By that time the area of Ybytymini comprised the current territory of Tebicuary as well as of neighboring district Ybytimí. Juana had acquired the estate from a royal ensign named Juan Bautista Achard. In 1785, Spanish traveller Félix de Azara described Ybytymini as "of broad extension" and with a population of 600 people and with crops like sugarcane, tobacco and yucca.
