= Doctor Botrell =

- Location within Paraguay
- Coordinates: 25°34′48″S 56°19′12″W
- Country: Paraguay
- Department: Guairá

Population (2002)
  - Total: 1,390

Doctor Botrell is a village and distrito in the Guairá Department of Paraguay.

== Sources ==
- World Gazeteer: Paraguay – World-Gazetteer.com
