= Paso Yobai =

- Paso Yobai
- Location within Paraguay
- Coordinates: 25°45′00″S 56°26′0″W
- Country: Paraguay
- Department: Guairá
- Founded: 1923
- Founder: Jorge Naville

Government
  - Municipal Mayor: Sindulfo Díaz (ANR)

Population (2008)
  - Total: 25,067
- Time zone: -4 GMT
- Postal code: 3210
- Area code: (595) (552)

Paso Yobai is the easternmost district of the Guairá Department, Paraguay.

It was founded in 1923 by a Swiss (Geneva) settler George Naville (1877-1943) as an agricultural colony. The first permanent resident was a man named Jose Dolores Resquin who was an employee of Naville. Resquin produced yerba mate to be transported to Villarrica by ox-wagons. Paso Yobai was part of the district of Independencia until 1993.

Paso Yobai is historically known for the high quality of its production of yerba mate (ilex paraguariensis). Is also known for the production of sugar-cane, cotton and soy.

The Canadian company "Latin American Minerals, Inc." bought "Paraguayan Mines" in 2007 and negotiated an agreement with the Paraguayan government to begin mining in the district. .Although mining has brought increased prosperity to Paso Yobai, it has also brought environmental issues such as mercury contamination of the streams.

The harpist, Enrique Samaniego was born in Paso Yobai.

== Economy ==
The production and processing of yerba mate was the dominant economic activity in the district of Paso Yobai. At one time yerba mate cultivation covered 10,000 hectares of land. Nowadays there are 8,000 hectares under cultivation, and gold mining has replaced yerba mate as the most profitable economic activity. Yerba mate remains important in the local economy as there are several factories in the business creating brands like Sudetia, Aromatica, San Jose and Labrador.

While the cultivation of yerba mate, sugar cane, soybeans and other crops is still of great importance to the district, the discovery of gold encouraged many people to abandon agriculture in order to devote themselves to small scale mining. The recent presence of the Canadian company is a source of both fear and expectation. Many think that it will create good paying work and but others worry about whether they will be able to continue their small scale mining activities as the company expands its presence in the zone.

== Gold mining ==
Although rumors of gold had been floating for years in the area of Paso Yobai, only since the late 1990s have people actively begun mining. The gold rush began after an Ecuadorian man met a young woman from Paso Yobai in Asunción. The two got married, and the Ecuadorian discovered gold in a stream on his father-in-law's property. From there began the Gold fever that changed the life of many families.

Many locals call the small scale gold miners "garimpeiros". The steps needed to obtain the gold are varied and depend on the skills of the miner. Depending on their luck and the quality of the product, a miner might earn around 125,000 Guaranis per gram of gold powder. It generally takes between one and two days for a small scale miner to extract a gram of gold. But this gram is difficult to obtain. A garimpeiro can generally survive strictly of their mining activities if he can obtain 10 grams or more of gold a month.

Miners use mercury to separate gold from sand and clay. Unfortunately, the mercury often enters and contaminates watercourses. Arroyo Gasory, the largest stream, is now highly contaminated with mercury and the fish are unsafe to eat.

== Local Festivities ==
One of the most important celebrations in Paso Yobai is the Patronage Festival (in spanish Fiesta Patronal), celebrated every August 15 honoring its patron saint, the Virgin of Asuncion.

The festivities start with the novena each afternoon, with every neighborhood organizing one day of it. Also, on the lawn of the Catholic Church there is a religious choir competition. People come from throughout the district to participate in this celebration.

On the morning of the 15th there is a procession with the image of the Virgin on the streets which are decorated with bamboo arches and paper strings. The procession attentands go to the church where the local parish priest begins the celebratory Mass. After the Mass, the celebration continues with bullfighting, dance and music.

== Borders of Paso Yobai ==
- North: Mauricio José Troche and Caaguazú Department.
- South: Caazapá Department.
- West: Colonia Independencia
- East: Caazapá Department.

== Watercourses ==
Through the district flows the Capiibary river, tributary of the Parana River, and the following streams:

- Mangrullo
- Baba
- Pacobá
- Curuzú
- Ycuá Porá
- Morotí
- Gasory
- Itacarú
- Zanja Pytá
- Cabayuby

== Demographics ==
The main social-demographic indicators in the district report:

- Population under 15 years old: 45.2%
- Average of kids per woman: 3.6 kids
- Percentage of illiterates: 10.7%
- Percentage of the population occupied in agricultural activities: 82.0%
- Percentage of houses with electricity service: 77.8%
- Percentage of houses with water service: 12.1%

Population with unsatisfied basic needs in:

- Education: 9.6%
- Sanitary infrastructure: 18.3%
- Housing quality: 50.3%
- Subsistence capacity: 17.0%

== Rural sub-districts ==
The district has 22 rural sub-districts joined by dirt roads. The most important districts are: Sudetia, Arroyo Morotí, Planchada, San Isidro, Nueva Guairá, Capii, Curuzú, Natividad, San Roque, Mangrullo, Torres Cué, Tayi, San Antonio, Nansen, 3 de Noviembre, San José, Santa María, San Francisco and Colonia Bergthal.

== Native communities ==
There are several Amerindian communities in the district, members of the Mbya ethnicity. These communities include:

- Rancho Kuña
- Yryvu Kua
- Naranjito
- Santa Teresita
- Nance
- Ovenia
- Isla Hu

== Transportation ==
Many bus lines serve Paso Yobai. Empresa Ybytyruzu has three buses a day to and from Asunción (5 to 6 hours). Empresa Sudetia has six buses a day to and from Villarrica (2 to 2.5 hours). Empresa 8 de Noviembre has one bus a day to and from Caaguazu (1.5 hours).

Because the roads are made of dirt, often motorized vehicles have difficulty after rainstorms. Since the discovery of gold, more and more people in the district are buying and riding motorcycles.

== Population ==
According to the most recent data provided by the General Office of Statistics, Polls and Census, this is the demographic information for the Paso Yobai district:

The total population is 25,067 inhabitants, 13.386 males and 11.682 females.

- Population from to 14 years old: 45.2%
- Population from 15 to 64 years old: 51.2%
- Population from 65 years old: 3.6%
- 92.04% of the population is settled in the rural zone.
