= Iturbe, Paraguay =

Iturbe
- Town
- Location within Paraguay
- Coordinates: 26°3′0″S 56°30′0″W
- Country: Paraguay
- Department: Guairá

Population (2008)
  - Total: 5 012

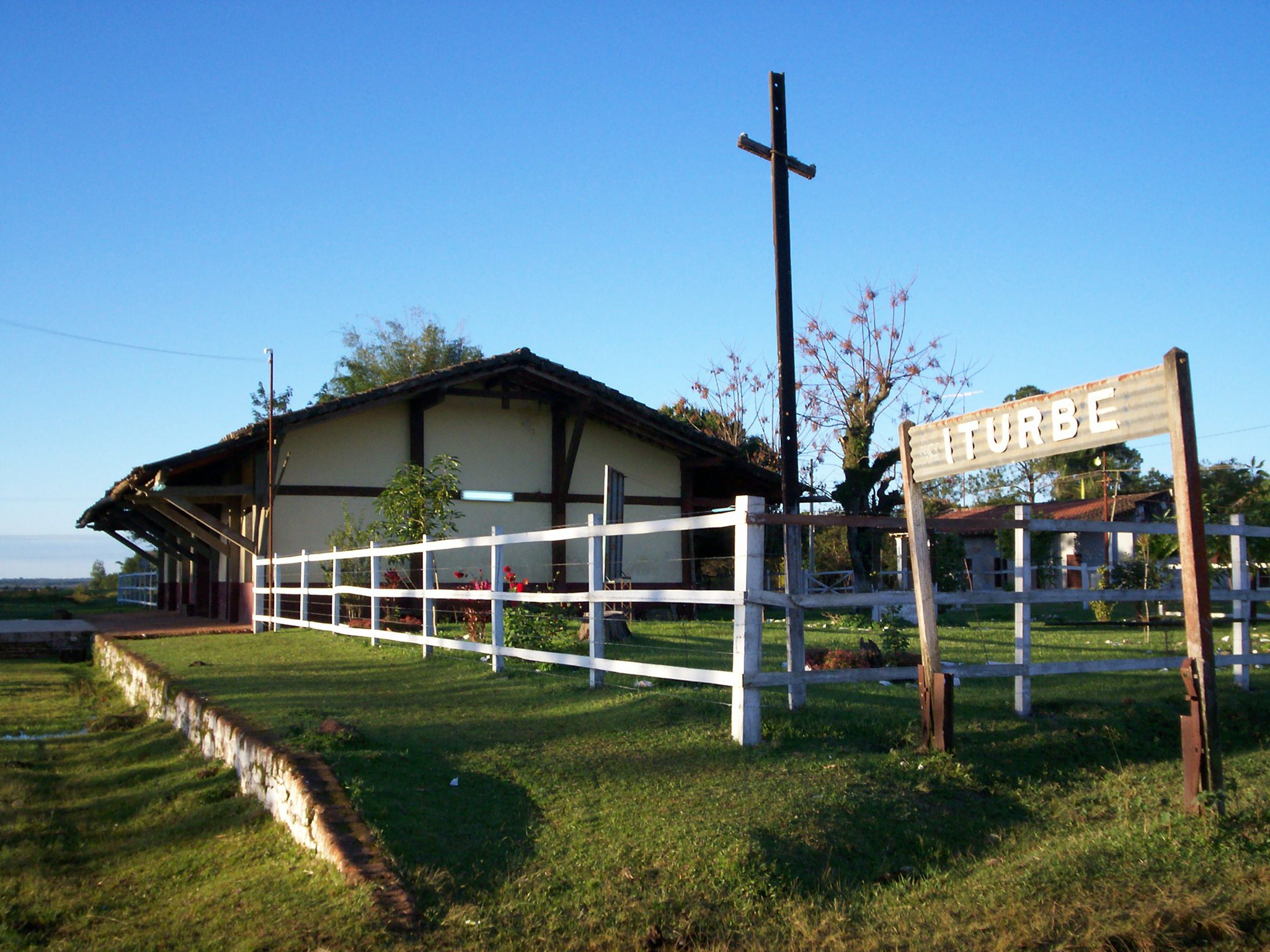
Former Iturbe station, Carlos Antonio López Railway.

Iturbe is a town in the Guairá Department of Paraguay.

== Sources ==
- World Gazeteer: Paraguay – World-Gazetteer.com
