= List of ambassadors of Paraguay to Brazil =

Ambassador of Paraguay to Brazil
- Coat of Arms of Paraguay

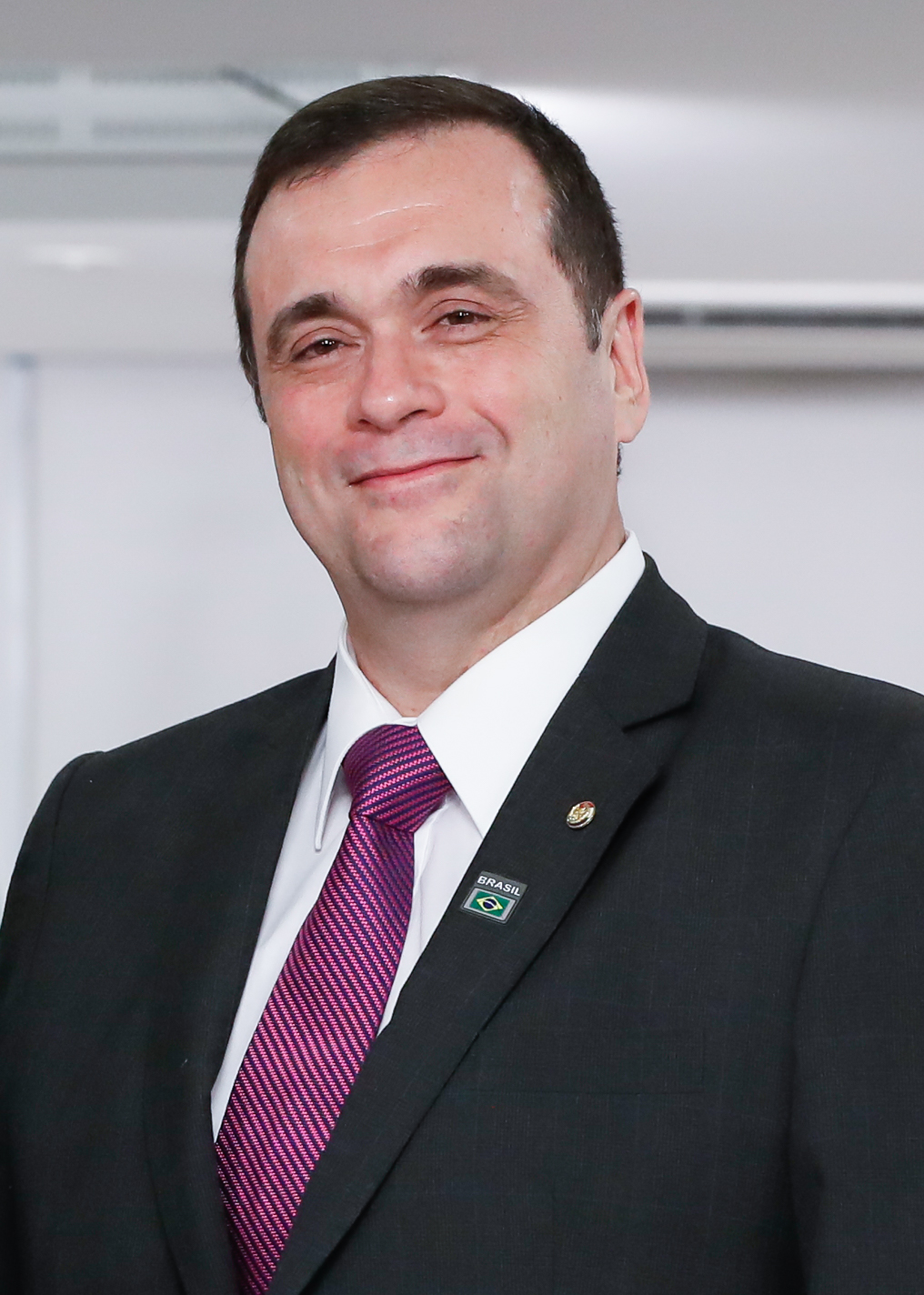
- Incumbent; Juan Ángel Delgadillo Franco since 10 March 2019
- Inaugural holder: Juan Andrés Gelly
- Formation: 1847

The Paraguayan ambassador in Brasília is the official representative of the Government in Asunción to the Government of Brazil.

As well as an embassy, Paraguay has several consulates across Brazil that offer a variety of services, such as representation for nationals.

== List of representatives ==
Representative	Title	Diplomatic accreditation	Term end	President of Paraguay	Head of State of Brazil
Juan Andrés Gelly	Envoy Plenipotentiary	1847	1849	Carlos Antonio López	Dom Pedro II
José Berges	Envoy Plenipotentiary	1855	1856	Carlos Antonio López	Dom Pedro II
Jaime Sosa	Minister Plenipotentiary	1874	1875	Juan Bautista Gill	Dom Pedro II
Facundo Machaín	Minister Plenipotentiary	1875	1875	Juan Bautista Gill	Dom Pedro II
José Segundo Decoud	Minister Plenipotentiary	1892	1894	Juan Gualberto González	Floriano Peixoto
Fernando Iturburu	Minister Plenipotentiary	1899	1899	Emilio Aceval	Campos Sales
Pedro Peña	Minister Plenipotentiary	1901	1905	Emilio Aceval	Campos Sales
Manuel Gondra	Minister Plenipotentiary	1905	1908	Juan Bautista Gaona	Rodrigues Alves
Juan Silvano Godoi	Minister Plenipotentiary	1911	1911	Albino Jara	Hermes da Fonseca
Francisco Chaves	Minister Plenipotentiary	1911	1912	Liberato Marcial Rojas	Hermes da Fonseca
Ramón Lara Castro	Minister Plenipotentiary	1912	1915	Emiliano González Navero	Hermes da Fonseca
Silvano Mosqueira	Minister Plenipotentiary	1915	1918	Eduardo Schaerer	Venceslau Brás
Ramón Lara Castro	Minister Plenipotentiary	1918	1920	Manuel Franco	Venceslau Brás
Silvano Mosqueira	Chargé d'affaires	1920	1920	José Pedro Montero	Epitácio Pessoa
Modesto Guggiari	Minister Plenipotentiary	1920	1923	José Pedro Montero	Epitácio Pessoa
Rogelio Ibarra	Minister Plenipotentiary	1924	1928	Luis Alberto Riart	Arthur Bernardes
Fulgencio Moreno	Minister Plenipotentiary	1928	1933	Eligio Ayala	Getúlio Vargas
Justo Pastor Benítez	Minister Plenipotentiary	1934	1936	Eusebio Ayala	Getúlio Vargas
Isidro Ramírez	Minister Plenipotentiary	1936	1937	Rafael Franco	Getúlio Vargas
Luis Alberto Riart	Minister Plenipotentiary	1938	1939	Félix Paiva	Getúlio Vargas
Vicente Rivarola	Minister Plenipotentiary	1939	1940	Félix Paiva	Getúlio Vargas
Juan B. Ayala	Minister Plenipotentiary	1940	1942	José Félix Estigarribia	Getúlio Vargas
Juan B. Ayala	Ambassador	1942	1946	Higinio Morínigo	Getúlio Vargas
Celso Velázquez	Ambassador	1946	1947	Higinio Morínigo	Eurico Gaspar Dutra
Raimundo Rolón	Ambassador	1947	1948	Juan Manuel Frutos	Eurico Gaspar Dutra
José Dahlquist	Ambassador	1948	1949	Juan Manuel Frutos	Eurico Gaspar Dutra
Liberato Rodriguez	Ambassador	1949	1949	Felipe Molas López	Eurico Gaspar Dutra
José Antonio González	Ambassador	1949	1950	Felipe Molas López	Eurico Gaspar Dutra
Fabio da Silva	Ambassador	1950	1952	Federico Chavez	Eurico Gaspar Dutra
Emilio Diaz de Vivar	Ambassador	1953	1955	Federico Chavez	Getúlio Vargas
Raúl Sapena Pastor	Ambassador	1955	1956	Alfredo Stroessner	João Café Filho
Hipólito Sánchez Quell	Ambassador	1956	1959	Alfredo Stroessner	Juscelino Kubitschek
Luis Martinez Miltos	Ambassador	1960	1961	Alfredo Stroessner	Juscelino Kubitschek
Raúl Peña	Ambassador	1961	1966	Alfredo Stroessner	Jânio Quadros
José Antonio Moreno Ruffinelli	Ambassador	1966	1981	Alfredo Stroessner	Humberto Castelo Branco
Adolfo M. Samaniego	Ambassador	1981	1986	Alfredo Stroessner	João Figueiredo
Salvador Rubén Paredes	Ambassador	1986	1989	Alfredo Stroessner	José Sarney
Juan Esteban Aguirre Martínez	Ambassador	1989	1992	Andrés Rodríguez	José Sarney
Luis María Ramírez Boettner	Ambassador	1992	1993	Andrés Rodríguez	Fernando Collor de Mello
Dido Florentín Bogado	Ambassador	1994	1997	Juan Carlos Wasmosy	Itamar Franco
Luis González Arias	Ambassador	1998	1999	Juan Carlos Wasmosy	Fernando Henrique Cardoso
Carlos Alberto González	Ambassador	1999	2001	Luis Ángel González Macchi	Fernando Henrique Cardoso
Luis González Arias	Ambassador	2001	2009	Luis Ángel González Macchi	Fernando Henrique Cardoso
Evelio Fernández Arévalos	Ambassador	2012	2013	Federico Franco	Dilma Rousseff
Manuel Maria Cáceres Cardozo	Ambassador	2013	2019	Horacio Cartes	Dilma Rousseff
Juan Ángel Delgadillo Franco	Ambassador	10 March 2019		Mario Abdo Benitez	Jair Bolsonaro
