= List of ambassadors of Paraguay to the United States =

Coordinates: 38°54′43.3″N 77°2′57.7″W

Ambassador of Paraguay to the United States Embassy of Paraguay in Washington, D.C.
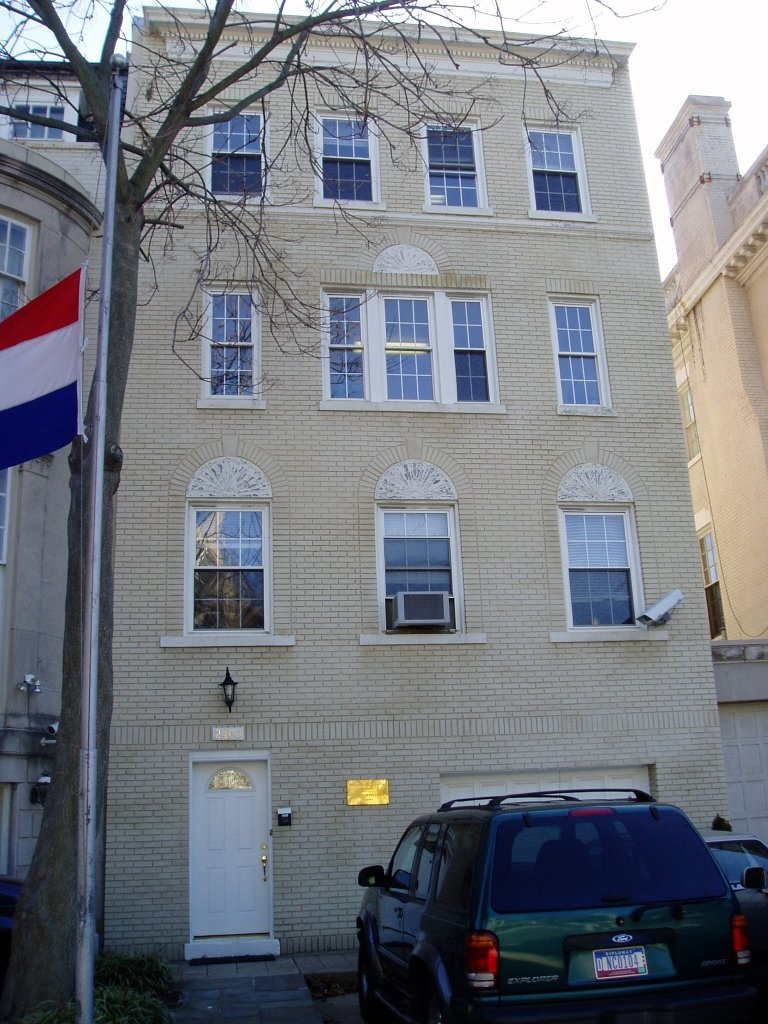
- Inaugural holder: José Machain
- Formation: 1876

The Paraguayan ambassador in Washington, D. C. is the official representative of the Government in Asunción to the Government of the United States.

== List of representatives ==
Diplomatic agrément	Diplomatic accreditation	Ambassador	Observations	President of Paraguay	President of the United States	Term end
1876		José Machain	Minister Plenipotentiary in special mission	Juan Bautista Gill	Ulysses S. Grant	
1877		Tomás Benjamín Aceval Marín	Minister Plenipotentiary in special mission, he represented the government of Higinio Uriarte in the Chaco Boreal dispute with Argentina, after the Paraguayan War, to the President of the U.S.A. Rutherford B. Hayes. In his arbitration, Hayes awarded the region to Paraguay.	Higinio Uriarte	Rutherford B. Hayes	1879
1892		César Gondra	Minister Plenipotentiary in special mission	Juan Gualberto González	Benjamin Harrison	1893
April 15, 1904			LEGATION OPENED	Juan Bautista Gaona	Theodore Roosevelt	
April 15, 1904		Cecilio Báez		Juan Bautista Gaona	Theodore Roosevelt	
January 1, 1907	March 1, 1913		LEGATION REMOVED, LEGATION REPLACED	Benigno Ferreira	Theodore Roosevelt	
February 18, 1913		Héctor Velázquez		Eduardo Schaerer	Woodrow Wilson	
September 23, 1918		Manuel Gondra		Manuel Franco	Woodrow Wilson	
July 12, 1920		William Wallace White	Consul General in N.Y. in charge of Legation	Manuel Gondra	Woodrow Wilson	
January 29, 1925		Eusebio Ayala	Paraguayan foreign minister	Luis Alberto Riart	Calvin Coolidge	
September 11, 1925		Juan Vicente Ramírez	Chargé d'affaires (1887-1977)	Luis Alberto Riart	Calvin Coolidge	
April 1, 1929		Pablo Max Ynsfrán	Chargé d'affaires	José Patricio Guggiari	Herbert C. Hoover	
February 25, 1933		William Wallace White	Consul General in N.Y.	Eusebio Ayala	Franklin D. Roosevelt	
April 11, 1933		Enrique Bordenave		Eusebio Ayala	Franklin D. Roosevelt	
April 1, 1926		William Wallace White	Consul General in N.Y. Chargé d'affaires of Legation	Luis Alberto Riart	Calvin Coolidge	
June 10, 1936	June 22, 1936	Alfredo Busk Codas	E.E. and M.P. (Minister resigned on September 4, 1937. His name continued to appear on List with notation of resignation until removal of Legation from January 1938 List)	Rafael Franco	Franklin D. Roosevelt	
January 1, 1938	May 1, 1938		LEGATION REMOVED, LEGATION REPLACED	Félix Paiva	Franklin D. Roosevelt	
May 3, 1938	May 19, 1938	José Félix Estigarribia	General	Félix Paiva	Franklin D. Roosevelt	
June 17, 1939		Pablo Max Insfran	Chargé d'affaires, YNSFRÁN, Pablo Max, professor, pub- lic official; b. Asunción, June 30, 1894; s. Facundo Ynsfrán and Francisca Gimenes; ed. Escuela de Notariado, 1915–17; School of Fgn. Service, Georgetown Univ., Washington, 1930–31; ra. Carmen	José Félix Estigarribia	Franklin D. Roosevelt	
November 8, 1939	November 14, 1939	Horacio Aníbal Fernández	(b. Asunción, April 3, 1905) lawyer, public accountant. President of the Chamber of Deputies and a professor.	José Félix Estigarribia	Franklin D. Roosevelt	
November 28, 1940	December 19, 1940	Juan José Soler		Higinio Morínigo	Franklin D. Roosevelt	
March 31, 1942			LEGATION RAISED TO EMBASSY	Higinio Morínigo	Franklin D. Roosevelt	
March 23, 1942	March 31, 1942	Celso Ramon Velázquez		Higinio Morínigo	Franklin D. Roosevelt	
March 26, 1946	April 9, 1946	Juan Bautista Ayala		Higinio Morínigo	Harry S. Truman	
August 21, 1946		César Romeo Acosta	Chargé d'affaires	Higinio Morínigo	Harry S. Truman	
June 23, 1947	July 2, 1947	Guillermo Enciso Velloso		Higinio Morínigo	Harry S. Truman	
April 19, 1948	April 23, 1948	Juan Félix Morales		Juan Natalicio González	Harry S. Truman	
January 31, 1949	April 13, 1949		SEVERED RELATIONS, RESUMED RELATIONS	Raimundo Rolón	Harry S. Truman	
August 1, 1949	August 5, 1949	Luis Óscar Boettner		Raimundo Rolón	Harry S. Truman	
March 17, 1954	March 26, 1954	Guillermo Enciso Velloso		Alfredo Stroessner	Dwight D. Eisenhower	
December 18, 1956	December 28, 1956	Osvaldo Chaves		Alfredo Stroessner	Dwight D. Eisenhower	
July 8, 1958	July 29, 1958	Juan Plate		Alfredo Stroessner	Dwight D. Eisenhower	
March 7, 1968	March 15, 1968	Roque Jacinto Avila		Alfredo Stroessner	Lyndon B. Johnson	
January 10, 1973	March 2, 1973	Miguel Solano Lopez		Alfredo Stroessner	Richard Nixon	
October 18, 1976		Juan Alberto Llanes	Chargé d'affaires	Alfredo Stroessner	Gerald Ford	
May 10, 1977	May 16, 1977	Mario López Escobar		Alfredo Stroessner	Jimmy Carter	
October 15, 1983		Juan Carlos A. Hrase Von Bargen	Chargé d'affaires, From 1984-1989 he was ambassador in Tokyo	Alfredo Stroessner	Ronald Reagan	
January 17, 1984	March 13, 1984	Marcos Martínez Mendieta		Alfredo Stroessner	Ronald Reagan	
April 27, 1992	May 5, 1992	Juan Esteban Aquirre Martinez		Andrés Rodríguez	George H. W. Bush	
January 11, 1995	March 20, 1995	Jorge G. Prieto Conti		Juan Carlos Wasmosy	Bill Clinton	
August 9, 1999	August 10, 1999	Juan Esteban Aguirre Martinez		Luis Ángel González Macchi	Bill Clinton	
August 2, 2000	September 5, 2000	Leila Rachid de Cowles		Luis Ángel González Macchi	Bill Clinton	
December 11, 2003	March 31, 2004	James Spalding Hellmers		Nicanor Duarte Frutos	George W. Bush	
November 19, 2010	February 24, 2010	Rigoberto Gauto Vielman		Fernando Lugo	Barack Obama	
January 9, 2013	January 14, 2013	Fernando Antonio Pfannl Caballero		Horacio Cartes	Barack Obama	
September 15, 2014	September 18, 2014	Igor Alberto Pangrazio Vera		Horacio Cartes	Barack Obama	
January 21, 2016	January 28, 2016	Germán Hugo Rojas Irigoyen		Horacio Cartes	Barack Obama	
January 1, 2019	January 1, 2019	Manuel María Cáceres Cardozo		Mario Abdo Benítez	Donald Trump	2023
July 8, 2021	July 8, 2021	Jose Antonio dos Santos Bedoya		Mario Abdo Benítez	Joe Biden	2023
