= Juan Sinforiano Bogarín =

Paraguayan clergyman

- Archbishop of Asunción
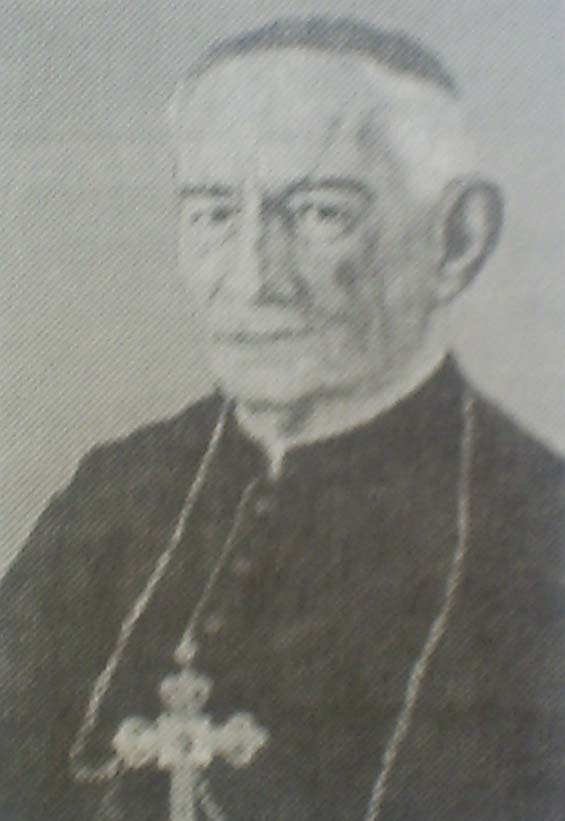
- Church: Catholic Church
- Archdiocese: Archdiocese of Asunción
- In office: 21 September 1894 – 25 February 1949
- Predecessor: Pedro Juan Aponte
- Successor: Juan José Aníbal Mena Porta

Orders
- Ordination: 24 February 1886
- Consecration: 3 February 1895 by Luigi Giuseppe Lasagna

Personal details
- Born: 21 August 1863 Mbuyapey, Paraguay
- Died: 25 February 1949 (aged 85)

Juan Sinforiano Bogarín (21 August 1863 – 25 February 1949) was an eminent Paraguayan clergyman, the first Roman Catholic archbishop of Paraguay.

== His life ==
Bogarín was born in Mbuyapey, a town in the Paraguarí Department, to Juan José Bogarin and Mónica de la Cruz González. Having become orphans after the War of the Triple Alliance, Juan Sinforiano and his three siblings were raised by their maternal aunt, María Pabla González.

He spent his childhood in Arecaya, Limpio. In 1880, at the age of 16, he entered the Counselor Seminary of Asunción, and graduated six years later. He was ordained as a priest on 24 February 1886, by Bishop Juan Antonio Aponte. He worked there until 1887, when he was chosen as bishop by Pope Leo XIII on 21 September 1894, after the death of Bishop Aponte in 1891. He was consecrated by the Main Bishop of Trípoli, Luigi Giuseppe Lasagna, on 3 February 1895 (the day of the Feast of St. Blaise, the patron saint of Paraguay).

Bogarín held several positions in the Paraguayan Church, including that of rector churchman of the cathedral and that of general secretary of the Ecclesiastic Curia.

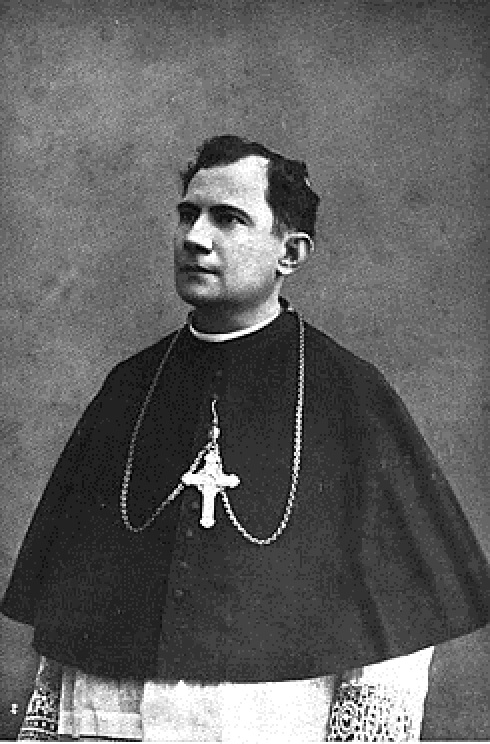
Juan Sinforiano Bogarín in his youth

== Priestly career ==
Bogarin promoted the organization of lay apostolates such as Catholic Action, the Catholic Ladies' League, and the Catholic Youth Federation, in an effort to restore order and social respect in Paraguay.

He struggled against liberal organizations that proposed civil marriage, divorce and lay education. He also campaigned against Freemasonry, anarchism, and partisan fanaticism.

The history of Paraguay contained a long and tumultuous record of revolutions and coup d'états. He responded to each upheaval he witnessed through his Pastoral Letters, demanding peace between families, demanding cessation of all tortures and hostilities, and exhorting people to take care of the spiritual needs of their brethren.

The "traveler bishop" toured almost fifty thousand kilometers of Paraguay, encouraging people in the countryside to socially organize to defend their lands and their rights, without forgetting his teachings about how to get closer to Christ.

The Bishop Hermenegildo Roa was his secretary and general vicar of the dioceses.

In 1929, the Ecclesiastic Province of the Paraguay was formed from the Archdioceses of Asunción, the dioceses of Villa Rica del Espíritu Santo and Concepción.

On 15 August 1930, he received the archiepiscopal pallium and a time later, after three decades of waiting, obtained the independence of Paraguay from the Archdiocese of Buenos Aires.

After a life fully dedicated to his evangelist labors, the archbishop died at the age of 85 in 1949.
