= Luis María Ramírez Boettner =

Paraguayan diplomat and lawyer

Ambassador of Paraguay to the Holy See
- In office June 7, 1996 – 1999

Minister of Foreign Affairs of Paraguay
- In office December 16, 1993 – May 9, 1996
- President: Juan Carlos Wasmosy
- Preceded by: Diógenes Martínez
- Succeeded by: Rubén Melgarejo Lanzoni

Ambassador of Paraguay to Brazil
- In office 1991–1993

Personal details
- Born: March 13, 1918 Asunción, Paraguay
- Died: July 25, 2017 (aged 99) Asunción, Paraguay
- Education: University of Chile; Universidad Nacional de Asunción; Harvard Law School; University of Michigan Law School
- Profession: Lawyer; Writer

Luis María Ramírez Boettner (March 13, 1918 – July 25, 2017) was a Paraguayan diplomat and lawyer who served as the Minister of Foreign Affairs of Paraguay from December 16, 1993, until May 9, 1996.

== Biography ==
Born in 1918, Ramírez started a bachelor's degree in philosophy and letters from the University of Chile in 1934. He then studied law at the Universidad Nacional de Asunción in Paraguay, from which he graduated in 1940 as a lawyer. He earned a master's degree from Harvard Law School in 1942 and a Doctor of Law (J.D.) from the University of Michigan Law School in 1944.

Ramírez joined the Foreign Ministry of Paraguay in 1936. He was appointed as Director of Protocol from 1940 to 1941 and Undersecretary of State for Foreign Affairs from 1954 to 1961. Additionally, he served as the first secretary of the Embassy of Paraguay in the United Kingdom and consul general in London in 1947. He also held the position of minister counselor at the Embassy of Paraguay in Washington, D.C. from 1951 to 1954.

Ramírez was appointed Ambassador of Paraguay to Brazil from 1991 to 1993. He then served as Paraguay's Minister of Foreign Affairs from December 16, 1993, until May 9, 1996 during the administration of President Juan Carlos Wasmosy. He was next appointed as Paraguay's Ambassador to the Holy See, by Decree No. 13617, from June 7, 1996, until 1999. Ramírez served concurrently as Ambassador to the Sovereign Military Order of Malta beginning on September 12, 1996.

Luis María Ramírez Boettner died on July 25, 2017, at the age of 99.

== Honors and awards ==
=== National ===
- Paraguay:
  - Grand Cross of the National Order of Merit

=== Foreign ===
- Argentina:
  - Grand Cross of the Order of the Liberator General San Martín
  - Grand Cross of the Order of May
- Bolivia:
  - Grand Cross of the Order of the Condor of the Andes
- Brazil:
  - Grand Cross of the Order of the Southern Cross
  - Grand Cross of the Order of Rio Branco
  - Grand Officer of the Order of Aeronautical Merit
- Chile:
  - Grand Cross of the Order of Bernardo O'Higgins
- Colombia:
  - Grand Cross of the Order of San Carlos
- Ecuador:
  - Grand Cross of the National Order of Merit
- Italy:
  - Knight Grand Cross of the Order of Merit
- Japan:
  - Grand Cordon of the Order of the Sacred Treasure
- SMOM:
  - Grand Cross of the Order pro Merito Melitensi
- Netherlands:
  - Grand Officer of the Order of Orange-Nassau
- Panama:
  - Grand Cross of the Order of Vasco Núñez de Balboa
  - Grand-Cross of the Order of Manuel Amador Guerrero
- Peru:
  - Grand Cross of the Order of the Sun
- Republic of China:
  - Special Grand Cordon of the Order of Brilliant Star
  - Grand Cordon of the Order of Propitious Clouds
- Vatican:
  - Knight Grand Cross of the Order of Pope Pius IX
- Venezuela:
  - Grand Cordon of the Order of the Liberator
  - Grand Cordon of the Order of Francisco de Miranda
