= José Patricio Guggiari =

Paraguayan politician

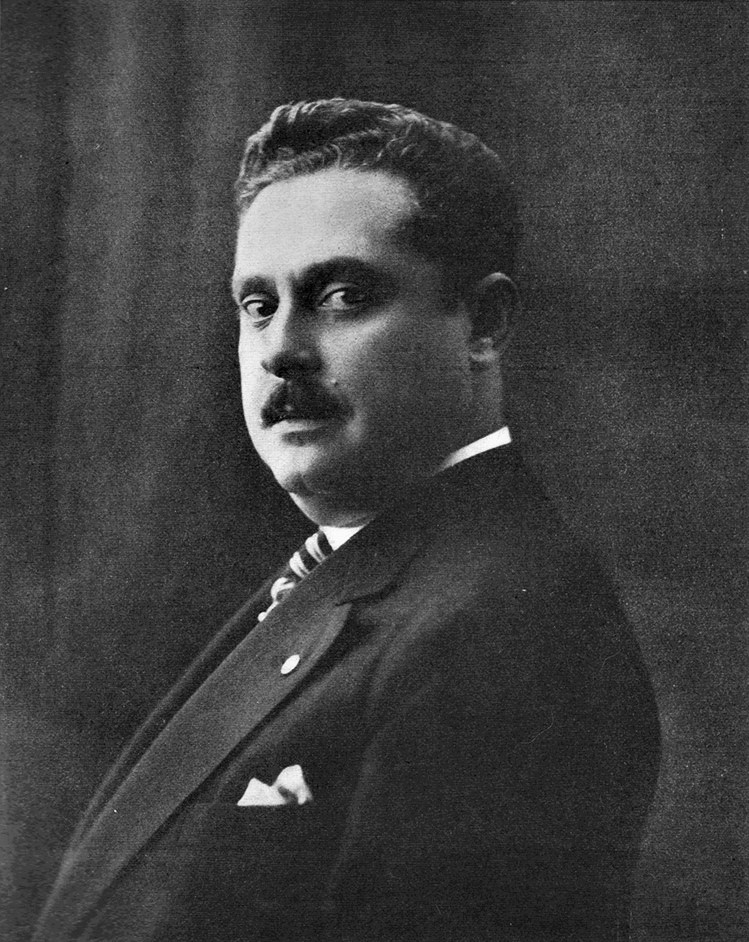
- Guggiari in 1929

32nd President of Paraguay
- In office 27 January 1932 – 15 August 1932
- Vice President: Emiliano González Navero
- Preceded by: Emiliano González Navero
- Succeeded by: Eusebio Ayala
- In office 15 August 1928 – 23 October 1931
- Vice President: Emiliano González Navero
- Preceded by: Eligio Ayala
- Succeeded by: Emiliano González Navero

Personal details
- Born: 17 March 1884 Asunción, Paraguay
- Died: 30 October 1957 (aged 73) Buenos Aires, Argentina
- Party: Liberal
- Spouse: Rosa Ramona Rojas
- Profession: lawyer and politician

José Patricio Guggiari Corniglione (17 March 1884 – 30 October 1957) was a Paraguayan politician who served as the 32nd president of Paraguay from 1928 to 1932. A member of the Liberal Party, he won the first free and fair elections in Paraguay history.

During his presidency, there was popular discontent over his handling of the Chaco dispute with Bolivia, as well as the role of his bodyguards in the killing of 11 people at a student rally protesting Guggiari.

== Biography ==
=== Background and political life ===
The records of the Civil Registry indicate that he was from Asunción, Paraguay's capital, born on March 17, 1884, from Pedro Guggiari and Petrona Corniglione, with Italian and Swiss ancestry. Married to Rosa Ramona Rojas, he was father to María Estela, José Antonio Guggiari Rojas, and Clementina.

He attended primary school in Villarrica in the interior, and secondary studies in the Colegio Nacional de la Capital in Asunción, graduating with a degree in science and letters. Afterwards, he studied law at the Universidad Nacional de Asunción. He would then hold the positions of prosecutor and later attorney general of the state between the years 1908 and 1910. Subsequently, he joined the Liberal Party, of which he was president of in 1924.

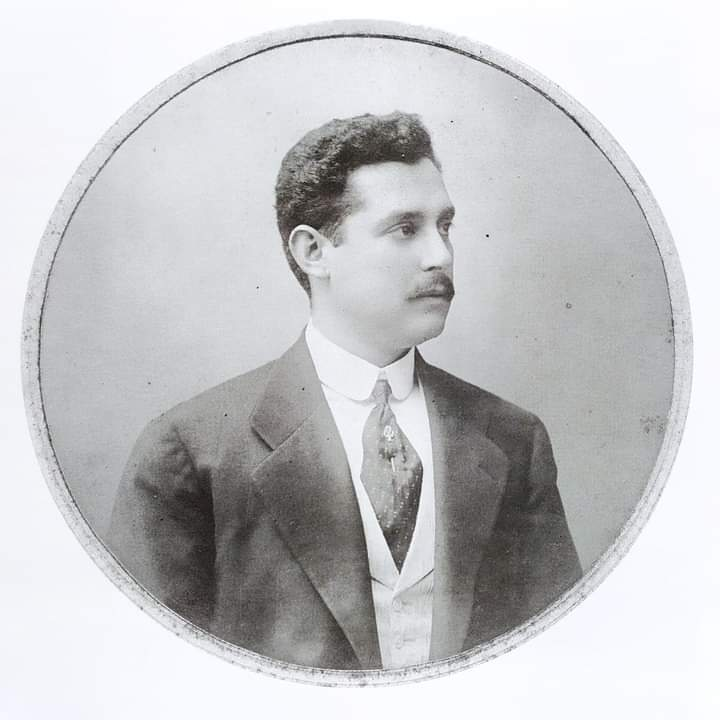
Guggiari in his youth, 1904

He was elected national deputy, in 1913; president of the chamber of deputies in 1918, 1923 and 1924–1927. In the interim he worked as interior minister for Manuel Gondra (1920). He was elected president in the April 1928 election, assuming it on August 15, 1928.

=== Presidency ===
Together with vice president Emiliano González Navero and a cabinet made up of Eligio Ayala, Rodolfo González and Justo Pastor Benítez, in the Ministry of Finance; Belisario Rivarola, Luis de Gásperi, Justo Pastor Benítez and Víctor Abente Haedo, in Interior; Rodolfo González, Eladio Velásquez, Justo Pastor Prieto, Justo Pastor Benítez and Alejandro Arce, in Justice, Worship and Public Instruction; Eliseo Da Rosa, Manlio Schenoni and Raúl Casal Ribeiro, in War and Navy; Gerónimo Zubizarreta and Higinio Arbo, in Foreign Affairs, he tried to prepare Paraguay with a conflict with Bolivia, which then was seen as inevitable.

In 1928, the National Congress of Defense was constituted, with little success, despite the circumstances; in 1929, after arduous debates, the Archdiocese of Asunción was created, and Juan Sinforiano Bogarín named as the first archbishop. In 1931 the old town of Ajos was renamed "Coronel Oviedo". Schools for dentistry and economics were created, serving as the basis for faculties of the Universidad Nacional de Asunción that were created later. A university reform was sanctioned. In 1931 a new plan of studies for the Colegio Nacional de la Capital was established. The gunboats Humaitá and Paraguay were acquired; they played a key role during the Chaco War with Bolivia, which began towards the end of his government.

Meanwhile, the incipient left was also active, as can be seen by the manifesto of the "Nuevo Ideario Nacional", and the occupation of Encarnación.

=== 23 October massacre ===
In March 1931, a "military uprising" was conjured up, awarded to the then mayor Rafael Franco. The tragic event that occurred on October 23, left a deep scar not only in the judgment of his government but in the sensitivity of his own person. The protest had originated because President Guggiari decided to keep his movements in the Chaco in secret because it was dangerous to share them with the press because he could alert the adversary, who at the time was Bolivia.

The University Students Center, led by Agustín Ávila, called for a march on the eve, on October 22, 1931, from the Plaza Uruguaya. From there they left for the Palace to demonstrate before the President of the Republic, Dr. José Patricio Guggiari. When they did not find the President, they continued to walk down the streets, without being stopped by the police, and they arrived to his home. Speeches were made and the house was stoned, already in a mob situation. Previously, they had been harangued by then-Major Rafael Franco. The students were, in the end, abruptly dispersed by the police.

The next day, students from the National College and the Normal School were invited to a new demonstration to protest the hostility shown by the police force on the eve. The column of students went through the newsrooms, threw stones at the premises of El Liberal and arrived at the Government Palace, where the President of the Republic was. The mood went on and the crowd ran over the protective police cordon of the Palace, heading to the staircase that led to the presidential office. The situation went out of control and a burst of machine gun left the guard of the Palace and generated mournful scenes. President Guggiari appeared on the balcony, ordering a cease-fire. Then, refugee in the Military School, he delegated the presidential command in González Navero and asked the National Congress for his political judgment. It was the first case of impeachment brought to term in the history of the country.

Those serious events occurred, occasion in which the quota of energy was in charge of colonel Arturo Bray, according to his own memories, Dr. Guggiari requested his trial by Congress, transferring from that date and until January 17, 1932, the first magistracy to the vice president, who was Mr. Emiliano González Navero. The parliament, acquitted him of guilt and punishment. With this he became the first Latin American president to be subjected to a political trial and acquitted of charges.

There is a theory that says that the Paraguayan Communist Party was behind the riots.

=== Time in Buenos Aires and his last days ===
With the revolution of February 17, 1936 and the resignation of President Eusebio Ayala, José P., as he was known, left Paraguay and remained for a time in Clorinda and Formosa in Argentina, where he received the alarming news that the president of the víctory, Dr. Ayala and the glorious war leader, General José Félix Estigarribia, were detained. Later he moved to Buenos Aires, where he established a residence. He was married to Rosa Rojas. His children accompanied him in exile, including Maria Stella, who was a nurse in the Chaco War, and who resided in Rosario. His other daughter Clementina was married to Wenceslao Peralta and settled in La Colmena with José's grandchildren: José, Titín, Pedro Bruno, Teresa and Martha. José's only son was named José Antonio.

In June 1940, during the presidency of General Estigarribia, with the news of the death of his mother, he returned to Paraguay by train, to Villarrica. He returned to exile when General Higinio Morínigo assumed the presidency, in September 1940. When, in 1946, President Morínigo took a turn for democracy, and decreed amnesty for all Paraguayans, Guggiari's return on August 14 was memorable. The return to democracy lasted only for 6 months; Guggiari returned to exile had not returned to Paraguay by the time of his death on October 29, 1957.

A famous quote attributed to him is "The pride of being a liberal is only overcome by the honor of being Paraguayan".

Political offices
Preceded by Eligio Ayala	President of Paraguay; 1928–1932	Succeeded by Eusebio Ayala
