= Pistelli =

Pistelli is an Italian surname. Notable people with the surname include:

- Ermenegildo Pistelli (1862–1927), Italian papyrologist, palaeographer, philologist, and presbyter
- Lapo Pistelli (born 1964), Italian politician

== See also ==
- Pistilli
