= Celso Ramon Velázquez =

Paraguayan lawyer, educator and diplomat

Paraguayan Ambassador to the United States of Paraguay to United States
- In office March 23, 1942/March 31, 1942 – April 9, 1946
- Preceded by: Juan José Soler
- Succeeded by: Juan Bautista Ayala

Paraguayan Ambassador to Brazil of Paraguay to Brazil
- In office April 9, 1946 – 1947
- Preceded by: Juan Bautista Ayala
- Succeeded by: Raimundo Rolón

Personal details
- Born: July 29, 1897 Asunción, Paraguay
- Died: October 14, 1951 (aged 54) Asunción, Paraguay
- Education: Colegio San José, Colegio Nacional
- Alma mater: 1920: Doctor of Law of the University of Asunción.

Celso Ramon Velázquez (July 29, 1897 – October 14, 1951) was a Paraguayan lawyer, educator and diplomat.

== Biography ==
=== Personal and early life ===
He was born in Asunción on July 29, 1897, to Antonio Velázquez and Claudia Ojeda. He was married to María Antonia Fernández Guanes, with whom he had a son, Antonio Raúl, and three daughters, María Rosa, María Lucila and María Regina. He studied law at the Universidad Nacional de Asunción.

=== Career ===
- 1914: Secretary, ministry of justice, worship and education.
- From 1915 to 1916 he was Secretary, Colegio Nacional de Asunción.
- From 1916 to 1919 he was Under-secretary of finance.
- From 1920 to 1924 he was Instructional judge, civil court.
- From 1924 to 1927 he was Judge at a lower commercial court.
- From 1927 to 1931 he was Judge at the court of appeals.
- From 1933 to 1935, During the Chaco War he was a member of the superior military tribunal, with rank of major.
- From 1942 to 1945 he was Professor, of civil and mercantile law, university de Asunción, dean of the law school, pres, of the university.
- On March 23, 1942 he was appointed the first Paraguayan Ambassador to the United States in Washington, D.C., where he was accredited from March 31, 1942 to April 9, 1946 with coacrediton as minister in Mexico City.
- In 1942 he was delegate to the 3rd Conference of Foreign Ministers, Rio de Janeiro,
- From July 1–22, 1944 he was delegate to the Bretton Woods Conference.
- In 1945 he was chairman, Paraguayan permanent delegation to the UNRRA. Inter-American Conference in Chapultepec.
- From 25 April 1945 to 26 June 1945 he was delegate to the United Nations Conference on International Organization in San Francisco.
- Starting in 1946 he was ambassador in Rio de Janeiro (Brazil).
