= Madeleine Renom =

Uruguayan meteorologist

Madeleine Renom Molina
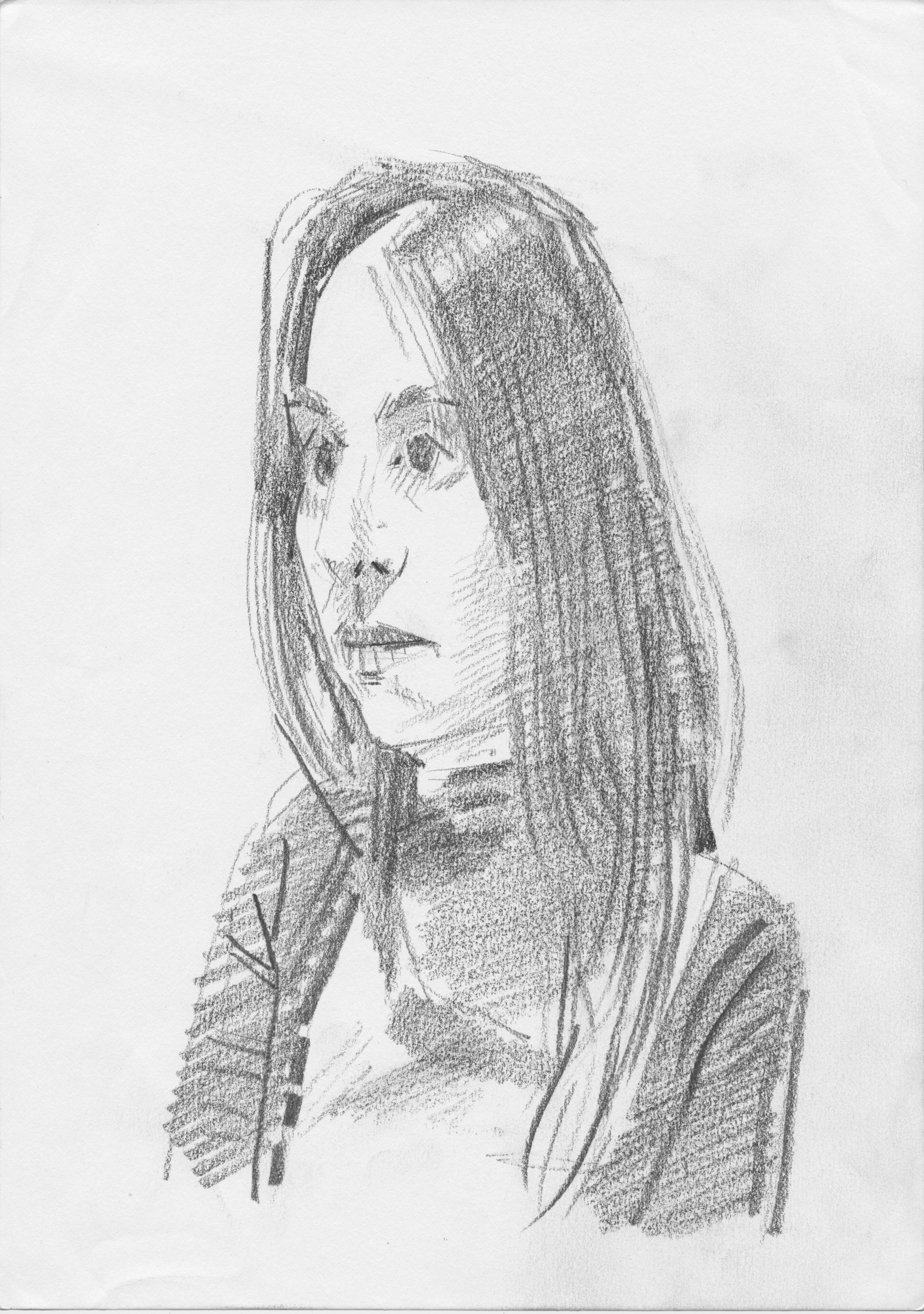
- Born: 22 February 1969 (age 57); Montevideo, Uruguay
- Education: University of the Republic (Uruguay)
- Occupations: Professor, Meteorologist, Director of the Institute of Meteorology of Uruguay
- Awards: Ciudadano de Oro del Centro Latinoamericano para el Desarrollo (CELADE) 2014

Madeleine Renom Molina (born February 22, 1969, in Montevideo) is a Uruguayan teacher, researcher and meteorologist. She was the first Graduate in Meteorological Sciences from the University of the Republic. Renom specialized in the University of Buenos Aires obtaining her doctorate in Atmospheric and Ocean Sciences. Renom is a professor in the Department of Atmospheric Sciences of the Physics Institute of the Faculty of Sciences, and a researcher at the PEDECIBA-Geosciences and level I researcher of the National System of Researchers of the ANII. She was the Director of the Uruguayan Institute of Meteorology (INUMET) up until July 15, 2020.

== Career ==
Madeleine Renom started a Bachelor's degree in Meteorological Sciences in 1990 at the Faculty of Sciences of the University of the Republic in Uruguay. Between 2004 and 2009 she obtained a doctorate in Atmospheric and Ocean Sciences at the Faculty of Exact and Natural Sciences of the University of Buenos Aires in Argentina, tutored by Dr. Matilde Mónica Rusticucci, with the work titled Temperaturas extremas en Uruguay. Análisis de la variabilidad temporal de baja frecuencia y su relación con la circulación de gran escala [Extremes temperatures in Uruguay. Analysis of low frequency temporal variability and its relationship with large-scale circulation].

Renom's work focuses on climatology, climate variability, climate change and extreme climate events. Her main interest lies in understanding how extreme weather events happen, to be able to predict the event itself as well as its social and economic impacts. Renom has published scientific articles in peer-reviewed journals and has presented over 20 papers presented at national and international scientific events. She has also worked as a teacher, directing undergraduate, master's and doctoral theses; Renom is known for encouraging women to pursue atmospheric science degrees.

She is a professor in the Department of Atmospheric Sciences of the Institute of Physics of the Faculty of Sciences, where she has been an adjunct professor since 2010. In addition, she is a Level 3 researcher of the Program for the Development of Basic Sciences (PEDECIBA) of Geosciences of the Uruguay. Renom is also categorized as a Level 1 Researcher of the National System of Researchers of the National Research and Innovation Agency (SNI, ANII, Uruguay).

In 2016, Renom became the Director of INUMET with the aim of perfecting the technical aspects of monitoring the atmosphere and weather and climate forecasts. It was the first time the position of presidency was held by a person trained in meteorology. She resigned from her position as Director on 15 July 2020, citing a lack of governmental support

== Scientific communication ==
Renom has been contacted by different national press media (written, radio and television) to talk about Atmospheric Science topics. One subject she is asked about is the Tornado de Dolores of 2016, the most extreme climatic event in recent years in Uruguay.

== Awards ==
2014 - winner together with Dr. Marcelo Barreiro of the Golden Citizen Award from the Latin American Center for Development (CELADE).

== Selected publications ==
- Barreiro, M., Díaz, N., Renom, M. Role of the global oceans and land atmosphere interaction on summertime interdecadal variability over northern Argentina. 2014. Climate Dynamics 42 (7-8) PP. 1733 – 1753.doi:10.1007/s00382-014-2088-6
- Rennie J.; Lawrimore J; Gleason B; Thorne P; Morice C.P; Menne M.J; Williams C.N; Gambi de Almeida W; Christy J; Flannery M; Ishihara M; Kamiguchi K; Klein-Tank A.M; Mhanda A; Lister D; Razuavaev V; Renom M; Rusticucci M; Tandy J; Worley S; Venema V; Angel W; Brinet M; Dattore B; Diamond H; Lazzara M; Le Blancq F; Luterbacher J; Machel H; Revadekar J; Vose R; Yin X. The International surface temperature initiative global land surface databank: Monthly temperature data version 1 release description and methods. 2014. Geoscience Data Journal. doi:10.1002/gdj3.8.
- Donat MG; Alexander LV; YANG H; Durre I; Vose R; Dunn R; Willet K; Aguilar E; BRUNET M; Caesar J; Hewitson B; Klein Tank AMG; Kruger A; Marengo J; Peterson TC; Renom M; Oria Rojas C; Rusticucci M; Salinger. 2013. Updated analyses of temperature and precipitation extreme indices since the beginning of the twentieth century: The HadEX2 dataset. Journal of Geophysical Research D: Atmospheres 118 (5) PP. 2098 – 2118 doi:10.1002/jgrd.50150.
- Renom, M., Rusticucci, M., Barreiro, M. Multidecadal changes in the relationship between extreme temperature events in Uruguay and the general atmospheric circulation . 2011 Climate Dynamics 37 (11-12) PP. 2471 – 2480 doi:10.1007/s00382-010-0986-9.
- Rusticucci M; Jones P; Amiel J; Ariztegui D; Boulanger J-P; Córdoba F; Farral A; Guerra L; Lister D; Penalba O; Piovano E; Renom M, Scavino M; Sylvestre F; Tencer B; Troin M; Vallet-Coulomb C. Observational data and past climate variability across the La Plata Basin. Clivar Exchanges, v.: 16 57 3, p.: 12 - 14, 2011.
- Rusticucci, M., Marengo, J., Penalba, O., Renom, M. An intercomparison of model-simulated in extreme rainfall and temperature events during the last half of the twentieth century. Part 1: Mean values and variability . 2010. Climatic Change 98 (3) PP. 493 – 508 . doi:10.1007/s10584-009-9742-8.
- Marengo, J.A., Rusticucci, M., Penalba, O., Renom, M. An intercomparison of observed and simulated extreme rainfall and temperature events during the last half of the twentieth century: Part 2: Historical trends . 2010. Climatic Change 98 (3) PP. 509 – 529 . doi:10.1007/s10584-009-9743-7.
- Rusticucci, M., Renom, M. Variability and trends in indices of quality controlled daily temperature extremes in Uruguay . 2008 International Journal of Climatology 28 (8) PP. 1083 – 1095 . doi:10.1002/joc.1607.
