= Juan Andrés Gelly =

Paraguayan diplomat, politician and lawyer

Juan Andrés Gelly Martínez
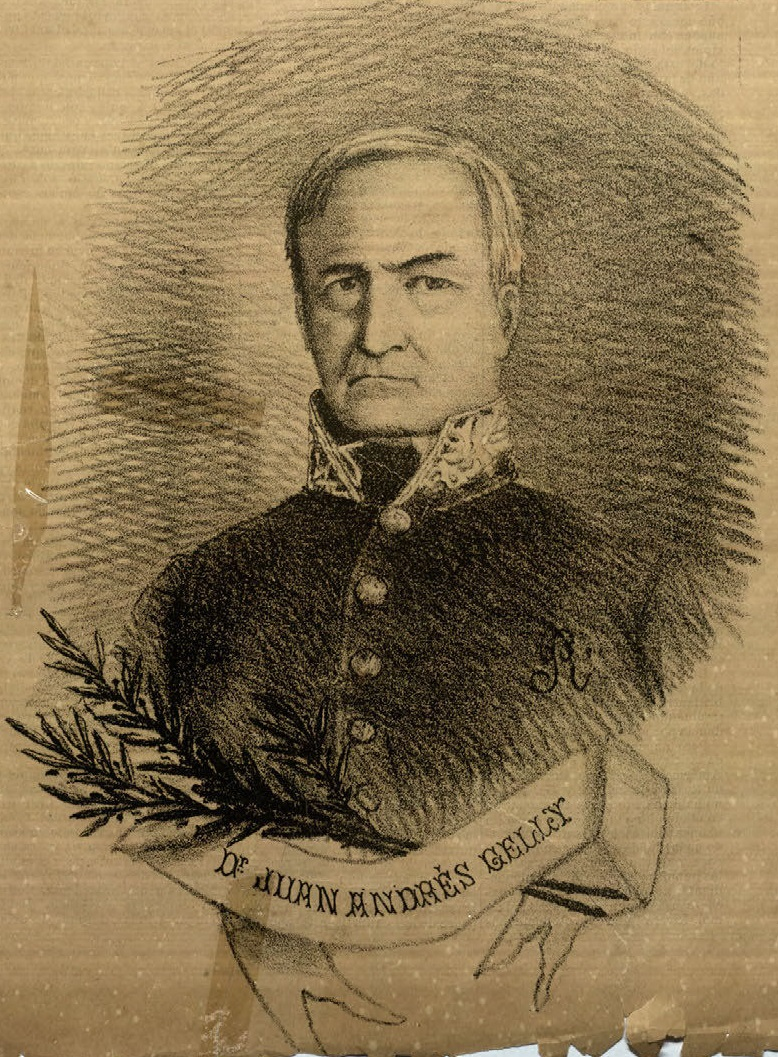
- Woodcut drawing of Gelly
- Born: 2 August 1790; Pirayú, Viceroyalty of the Río de la Plata
- Died: 24 August 1856 (aged 66); Asunción, Paraguay
- Spouse: María Micaela Obes
- Children: Juan Andrés Gelly y Obes; Micaela Gelly y Obes

Juan Andrés Gelly Martínez (2 August 1790 – 24 August 1856) was a Paraguayan lawyer, politician and diplomat who played an important role in the Plata region's independence and relations, and in the international recognition of Paraguay's independence specifically.

== Biography ==
=== Early life ===
Gelly was born in Pirayú in 1790, when Paraguay was still part of the Viceroyalty of the Río de la Plata, a Spanish colony. His father, a Catalan bureaucrat named Juan Gelly, had come from Barcelona to Asunción, where he'd married María del Carmen Martínez de Ibarra y Quiñonez from the colonial elite, a descendant of conquistador Domingo Martínez de Irala. His father became a landowner, and Andrés Gelly was sent to study in Buenos Aires, at the Real Colegio de San Carlos (the Colegio Nacional de Buenos Aires's predecessor). Later on, he also graduated as a Juris doctor from the National University of Córdoba, being one of the very few Paraguayans to possess superior education in the beginning of the 19th century.

Gelly aided the 1810 May Revolution, being present in the May 22 open cabildo where he voted to dismiss the Spanish viceroy. In the next year, he returned to Paraguay amidst public upheaval against the colonial governor Bernardo de Velasco, and was politically active against Spanish rule. After independence was de facto achieved, he became secretary to intendant governor José Gaspar Rodríguez de Francia, who soon after became Paraguay's first dictator. Before the change in power, however, he again left Paraguay for Buenos Aires, due to the dangerous political struggles in the former.

There, he worked as a lawyer and held some secondary positions in various Argentine governments. He also married Micaela Obes, sister to Lucas Obes, an Uruguayan lawyer.

=== Work as diplomat and politician ===
In 1826 Gelly worked as secretary to Argentine president Bernardino Rivadavia, and in the following year secretary for general Carlos María de Alvear during the Cisplatine War. He was a notable opponent of Manuel Dorrego's government (1827-28), and served as general José Maria Paz's secretary when Juan Lavalle toppled Dorrego and became interim governor; Paz and Lavalle were great allies. Gelly served in this capacity at the Battle of Navarro, which led to Dorrego's ultimate defeat. Some months later, he was a member of the party sent to welcome José de San Martín, who'd just returned from Europe, in Montevideo. San Martín was offered Buenos Aires' government, but he refused and left Argentina forever. During the Cisplatine War, he served as secretary to army commanders Carlos María de Alvear and Juan Antonio Lavalleja. Throughout this period of his life, Gelly was a prolific contributor to various newspapers in Buenos Aires.

Lavalle named Gelly chief of police for Buenos Aires in 1829. Later in the same year, however, Lavalle was defeated at the Battle of Márquez Bridge, and Gelly left with him to Montevideo, where he served as secretary to interim governor general José Rondeau and president Fructuoso Rivera. He formed part of a group known as "Los cinco hermanos", along with Nicolás Herrera, José Ellauri, Julián Álvarez, all of them married with sisters to Lucas Obes, the group's final member. They were very influential politically during Rivera's presidency, and collaborated closely with Santiago Vázquez, who had been one of the Thirty-Three Orientals and was Uruguayan Minister of Foreign Relations; between 1840 and 1844 Gelly worked under him and Francisco Antonino Vidal Gosende as "head officer of the State and Foreign Relations Ministries", a title equivalent to that of sub-secretary of State nowadays. They were once pictured by a newspaper as devils, robbing the people of Uruguay.

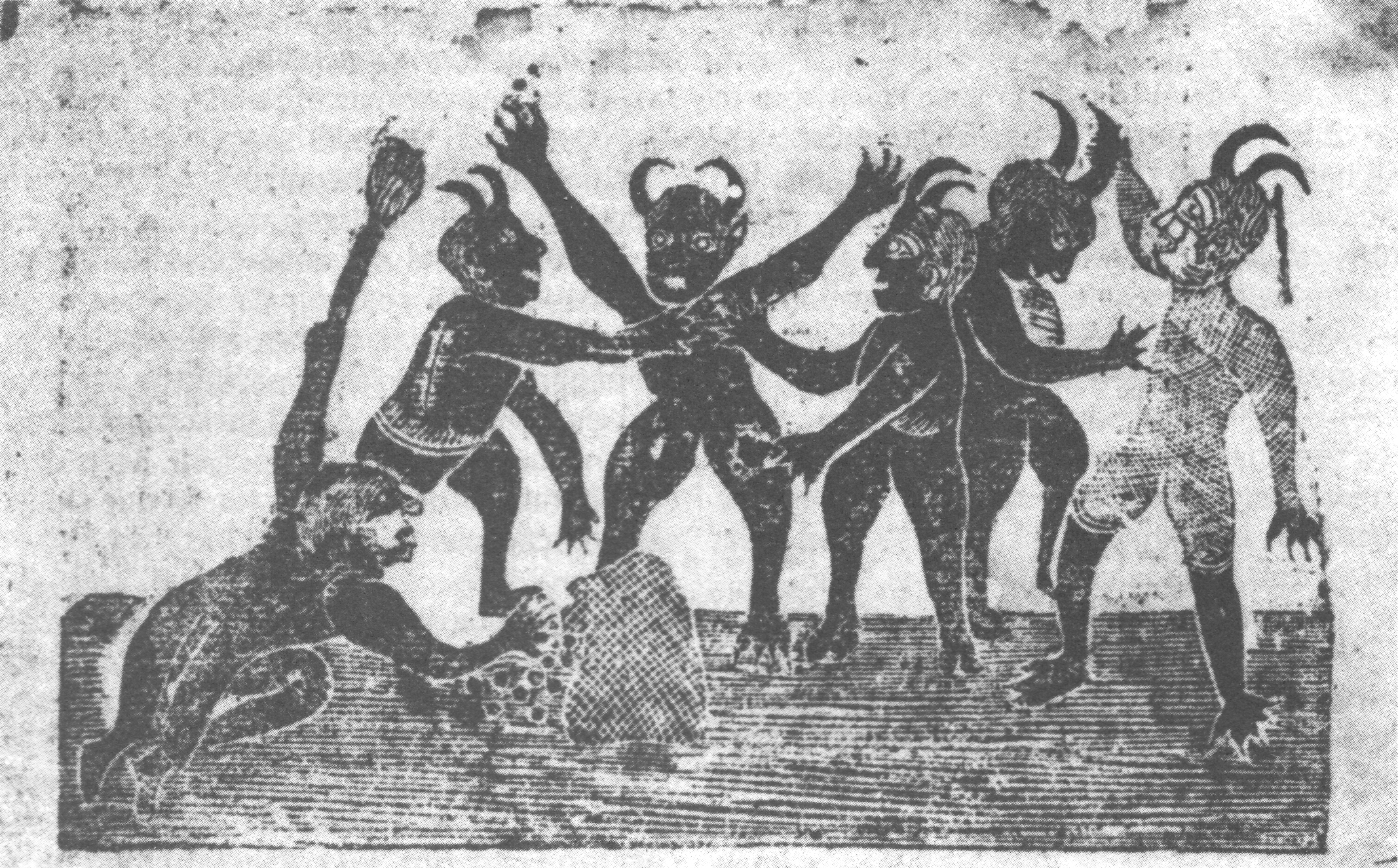
A caricature of the "five brothers" and Santiago Vázquez, with the underlying subtitle of "Ya lo veis - para el robo - somos seis" (You can already see it - for the theft - we're six)

During the Uruguayan Civil War, Gelly worked closely with the Gobierno de la Defensa, and fought in the Great Siege of Montevideo together with his son, future Argentine Army general Juan Andrés Gelly y Obes. In 1844, he asked to be dismissed from his post in Montevideo. He then returned to Paraguay to look after his family's estates, but president Carlos Antonio López, suspicious of his intentions, held him in house arrest in the town of Villarrica, in the interior, for seven months. Eventually, Gelly managed to earn López's trust, however, and in 1847 he was named Paraguay's ambassador to Brazil, a position he held until 1849. It was during his term as ambassador that Brazil recognized Paraguay's independence.

=== Later life ===
After his term as ambassador ended, he worked in the Paraguayan government in Asunción, and in his rural properties near; he also founded a law school in Asunción, directing it for years after his return, and teaching civil and political law. During this period, he is said to have introduced romanticism to Paraguay. He also wrote for the first Paraguayan newspaper, El Paraguayo Independiente, which was government-owned.

Between 1853 and 1855 he accompanied Francisco Solano López during the latter's travels through Europe as Paraguay's representative. After that, he returned to Asunción, where he died in August 24, 1856. In the last few months before his death, however, he helped solve a diplomatic crisis with Brazil over the navigation of the Paraguay River, and directed the governmental newspaper El Semanario.
