= Pistilli =

Pistilli is an Italian-language surname. Notable people with this surname include:

- Gene Pistilli, American songwriter
- Luigi Pistilli, Italian actor
- Matthew Pistilli, Canadian professional ice hockey player
- Marie Pistilli and Pasquale (Pat) Pistilli, originators of the Design Automation Conference
- Vicente Pistilli, Paraguayan academic
