= List of presidents of the Chamber of Deputies of Paraguay =

The president of the Chamber of Deputies of Paraguay is the presiding officer in the Paraguayan lower house. The president is elected by the Chamber of Deputies of Paraguay for a one-year term.

== Chamber of Representatives 1870-1940 ==
Name	Took office	Left office	Notes
Higinio Uriarte	27 February 1871	9 March 1871	
Juan Antonio Jara	9 March 1871	11 March 1871	
Higinio Uriarte / Antonio Taboada	16 March 1871		
Higinio Uriarte	11 March 1871	22 March 1871	
Juan Antonio Jara	22 March 1871	24 March 1871	
Higinio Uriarte / Juan Antonio Jara	24 March 1871		
Juan Antonio Jara	13 April 1871	15 April 1871	
Higinio Uriarte	15 April 1871	20 May 1871	
Juan Antonio Jara	20 May 1871	20 May 1871	
Higinio Uriarte	22 May 1871	29 May 1871	
Juan Antonio Jara	29 May 1871	7 June 1871	
Higinio Uriarte	7 June 1871	9 October 1871	
Juan Antonio Jara	9 October 1871	4 December 1871	
Higinio Uriarte	4 December 1871	12 December 1871	
Emilio Gill	12 December 1871	21 December 1871	
Higinio Uriarte	21 December 1871	26 December 1871	
Emilio Gill	26 December 1871	28 December 1871	
Higinio Uriarte	28 December 1871	18 January 1872	
Emilio Gill	18 January 1872	27 January 1872	
Higinio Uriarte	27 January 1872	14 February 1872	
Juan Bautista Gill	14 February 1872	29 February 1872	
Pedro Antonio Báez	29 February 1872	2 April 1872	
Higinio Uriarte	2 April 1872	9 July 1872	
Pedro Antonio Báez	9 July 1872	13 July 1872	
Higinio Uriarte	13 July 1872	23 September 1872	
Pedro Antonio Báez	23 September 1872	26 September 1872	
Higinio Uriarte	26 September 1872	4 October 1872	
Pedro Antonio Báez	4 October 1872	7 October 1872	
Eduardo Estigarribia	7 October 1872	8 October 1872	
Pedro Antonio Báez	8 October 1872	10 October 1872	
Eduardo Estigarribia	10 October 1872	12 October 1872	
Higinio Uriarte	12 October 1872	18 October 1872	
Pedro Antonio Báez	18 October 1872	22 October 1872	
Higinio Uriarte	22 October 1872	26 October 1872	
Pedro Antonio Báez	26 October 1872	30 October 1872	
Higinio Uriarte	30 October 1872	31 March 1873	
Pedro N. Oscariz	1 April 1873	30 May 1873	
Bernardo Ferriol	30 May 1873	9 July 1873	
Pedro N. Oscariz	9 July 1873	21 March 1874	
Félix de los Ríos	21 March 1874	1 April 1874	
José Villagra	1 April 1874	8 April 1874	
Pedro N. Oscariz	8 April 1874	29 May 1874	
José Villagra	29 May 1874	1 June 1874	
Pedro N. Oscariz	1 June 1874	3 August 1874	
Martín Velilla	3 August 1874	5 August 1874	
Pedro N. Oscariz	5 August 1874	20 March 1875	
Juan G. Alvarenga	20 March 1875	30 March 1875	
José del Rosario Miranda	30 March 1875	31 May 1875	
Félix Rios	31 May 1875	11 June 1875	
José del Rosario Miranda	11 June 1875	6 October 1875	
Zacarías Samaniego	6 October 1875	21 October 1875	
José del Rosario Miranda	21 October 1875	4 April 1876	
Juan Guanes	4 April 1876	7 June 1876	
Gaspar Centurión	7 June 1876	9 June 1876	
Juan Guanes	9 June 1876	19 July 1876	
Juan Antonio Jara	19 July 1876	22 July 1876	
Juan Guanes	22 July 1876	20 January 1877	
Juan Antonio Jara	20 January 1877	23 April 1877	
Adolfo Saguier	23 April 1877	25 April 1877	
Juan Antonio Jara	25 April 1877	4 May 1877	
Adolfo Saguier	4 May 1877	11 May 1877	
Juan Antonio Jara	11 May 1877	18 Junio 1877	
Otoniel Peña	18 Junio 1877	20 Junio 1877	
Juan Antonio Jara	20 Junio 1877	4 July 1877	
Adolfo Saguier	4 July 1877	11 May 1877	
José del Rosario Miranda	7 July 1877	20 January 1879	
Otoniel Peña	20 January 1879	26 January 1879	
Otoniel Peña	20 January 1879	26 January 1879	
Miguel Haedo	26 January 1879	1 April 1879	
Manuel Solalinde	1 April 1879	7 April 1879	
Miguel Haedo	7 April 1879	21 April 1879	
Manuel Solalinde	21 April 1879	25 April 1879	
Miguel Haedo	25 April 1879	28 April 1879	
Manuel Solalinde	28 April 1879	12 May 1879	
José del Rosario Miranda	12 May 1879	21 May 1879	
Miguel Haedo	21 May 1879	2 June 1879	
Manuel Solalinde	2 June 1879	6 June 1879	
Miguel Haedo	6 June 1879	9 June 1879	
Manuel Solalinde	9 June 1879	13 June 1879	
Miguel Haedo	13 June 1879	23 June 1879	
Manuel Solalinde	23 June 1879	25 June 1879	
Miguel Haedo	25 June 1879	30 June 1879	
Manuel Solalinde	30 June 1879	4 July 1879	
Zacarías Samaniego	4 July 1879	9 July 1879	
Manuel Solalinde	9 July 1879	11 July 1879	
Miguel Haedo	11 July 1879	16 July 1879	
Manuel Solalinde	16 July 1879	28 July 1879	
Miguel Haedo	28 July 1879	30 July 1879	
Manuel Solalinde	1 August 1879	4 August 1879	
Miguel Haedo	4 August 1879	8 August 1879	
Manuel Solalinde	8 August 1879	13 August 1879	
Miguel Haedo	13 August 1879	18 August 1879	
Manuel Solalinde	18 August 1879	21 August 1879	
Zacarías Samaniego	21 August 1879	22 August 1879	
Manuel Solalinde	22 August 1879	28 August 1879	
Juan Gualberto González	28 August 1879	12 April 1880	
Felipe Torrents	12 April 1880	14 April 1880	
Juan Gualberto González	14 April 1880	16 April 1880	
Felipe Torrents	16 April 1880	21 April 1880	
Juan Gualberto González	21 April 1880	3 May 1880	
Manuel Solalinde	3 May 1880	5 May 1880	
Juan Gualberto González	5 May 1880	10 May 1880	
Felipe Torrents	10 May 1880	17 May 1880	
Juan Gualberto González	17 May 1880	16 June 1880	
Felipe Torrents	16 June 1880	18 June 1880	
Juan Gualberto González	18 June 1880	30 June 1880	
Manuel Solalinde	30 June 1880	2 July 1880	
Juan Gualberto González	2 July 1880	11 August 1880	
Felipe Torrents	11 August 1880	16 August 1880	
Juan Gualberto González	16 August 1880	?	
Manuel Solalinde	? - April 1882	October 1883	
Antonio Taboada	October 1883	November 1883	
Gaspar Centurion	November 1883	November 1883 - ?	
José Tomás Sosa	? - April 1884	March 1886 - ?	
Zacarías Samaniego	? - April 1886	June 1886 - ?	
Claudio Gorostiaga	? - August 1886	August 1886 - ?	
Juan Gualberto González	? - April 1890	September 1890 - ?	
Zacarías Samaniego	? - October 1890	January 1891 - ?	
Andrés Héctor Carvallo	? - April 1891	October 1892 - ?	
Rufino Mazó	? - May 1893	October 1894 - ?	
Eduardo P. Fleytas	? - December 1894	October 1896 - ?	
Fernando Viera	? - May 1897	August 1897 - ?	
C. Rodolfo Saguier	? - June 1898	December 1898 - ?	
Rufino Mazó	? - April 1899	February 1900 - ?	
José Emilio Perez	? - April 1900	December 1902 - ?	
Carlos L. Isasi	? - April 1903	April 1903	
Rufino Mazó	April 1903	October 1903 - ?	
Pedro Miranda	? - April 1904	January 1905 - ?	
Carlos L. Isasi	? - April 1905	December 1905 - ?	
Pedro P. Caballero / Pedro Miranda	? - April 1906	November 1906 - ?	
Pedro P. Caballero / José Tomas Legal	? - May 1907	May 1908 - ?	
José Tomas Legal	? - May 1908	July 1908 - ?	
Ramón Lara Castro	? - January 1909	December 1909 - ?	
Eusebio Ayala	? - December 1909	December 1909 - ?	
Eligio Ayala	? - April 1910	December 1910 - ?	
Ramón Lara Castro	? - February 1911	February 1911 - ?	
Antolín Irala	? - May 1911	October 1911 - ?	
César C. Samaniego	? - January 1912	January 1912 - ?	
Carlos L. Isasi	? - August 1912	August 1912	
Víctor Abente Haedo	August 1912	January 1917 - ?	
Ernesto Velázquez	? - May 1917	October 1917 - ?	
José Patricio Guggiari	? - April 1918	November 1918 - ?	
Rogelio Ibarra	? - May 1919	January 1920 - ?	
Rómulo Goiburú	? - April 1920	October 1921 - ?	
Enrique Ayala	? - May 1922	June 1922 - ?	
Venancio B. Galeano	? - August 1922	August 1922 - ?	
Enrique Bordenave	? - October 1923	November 1923	
José Patricio Guggiari	November 1923	December 1923 - ?	
Manuel Peña Rojas	? - April 1924	May 1924 - ?	
José Patricio Guggiari	? - June 1924	January 1927 - ?	
Gerónimo Riart	? - January 1928	January 1929 - ?	
Raúl Casal Ribeiro	? - May 1929	September 1930 - ?	
Juan Carlos Garcete	? - April 1931	March 1933 - ?	
Gerónimo Riart	? - April 1933	July 1935 - ?	
Horacio A. Fernández	? - February 1939	August 1939 - ?	
Alejandro Marin Iglesias	? - October 1939	February 1940	

== Cámara de Representantes 1940-1968 ==
Name	Took office	Left office	Notes
Manuel Talavera	? - August 1948	December 1948	
Hermenegildo Olmedo	December 1948	January 1949 - ?	
Federico Chaves	April 1949	September 1949	
Evaristo Zacarias Arza	? - June 1951	September 1951 - ?	
Raúl Peña del Molino Torres	? - June 1952	September 1953 - ?	
Pastor C. Filártiga	? - July 1954	January 1957 - ?	
Evaristo Zacarias Arza	? - May 1957	January 1958 - ?	
Juan Eulogio Estigarribia	? - May 1958	March 1968 - ?	

== Chamber of Deputies since 1968 ==
Name	Took office	Left office	Notes
Julián Augusto Saldívar	? - August 1968	December 1977 - ?	
Juan Esteche Fanego	? - March 1978	March 1978 - ?	
Julián Augusto Saldívar	? - May 1978	November 1978	
Luis María Argaña	November 1978	November 1978 - ?	
Julián Augusto Saldívar	? - December 1978	October 1986 - ?	
Luis Martínez Miltos	? - June 1987	December 1988 - ?	
Miguel Ángel Aquino	1989	1990	
José Antonio Moreno Ruffinelli	1990	1993	3 terms
Francisco José de Vargas	1993	1994	
Atilio Martínez Casado	1994	1995	
Juan Carlos Ramírez Montalbetti	1995	1996	
Atilio Martínez Casado	1996	1998	2 terms
Walter Hugo Bower Montalto	1998	1999	
Efraín Alegre	1999	2000	
Cándido Vera Bejarano	2000	2001	
Juan Darío Monges Espínola	2001	2002	
Oscar Alberto González Daher	2002	2003	
Benjamín Maciel Pasotti	2003	2004	
Oscar Rubén Salomón Fernández	2004	2005	
Víctor Alcides Bogado González	2005	2007	2 terms
Oscar Rubén Salomón Fernández	2007	2008	
Enrique Salyn Buzarquis Cáceres	2008	2010	
Víctor Alcides Bogado González	June 2010	June 2013	3 terms
Juan Bartolome Ramírez	June 2013	June 2014	1 term
Hugo Velázquez Moreno	1 July 2014	30 June 2018	4 terms
Miguel Cuevas Ruíz Díaz	1 July 2018	30 June 2019	1 term
Pedro Alliana	1 July 2019	30 June 2022	3 terms
Carlos María López	1 July 2022	30 June 2023	1 term
Raúl Luís Latorre	1 July 2023	Present	
