= Leila Rachid de Cowles =

Paraguayan diplomat

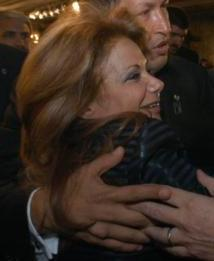
Leila Rachid de Cowles (cropped)

Leila Rachid de Cowles (born 30 March 1955 in Asunción) is a Paraguayan diplomat.

== Background and earlier life ==
Rachid studied Foreign Relations at the Universidad Católica Nuestra Señora de la Asunción (1973–1976). Afterwards she obtained a postgraduate degree at the Sociedad de Altos Estudios Internacionales, Madrid, Spain (1977–1978), another at the Centro de Estudios Constitucionales, Madrid, España (1978–1979) and a doctorate in Political Science at the Universidad Complutense de Madrid, Spain (1977–1979). She was Paraguayan Ambassador to the United States (2000–2003).

== Foreign Minister of Paraguay ==
She served as Foreign Minister of Paraguay during the presidential tenure of Nicanor Duarte Frutos (15 August 2003 – 21 August 2006).
