= Justo Pastor Benítez =

Paraguayan writer and politician (1897–1963)

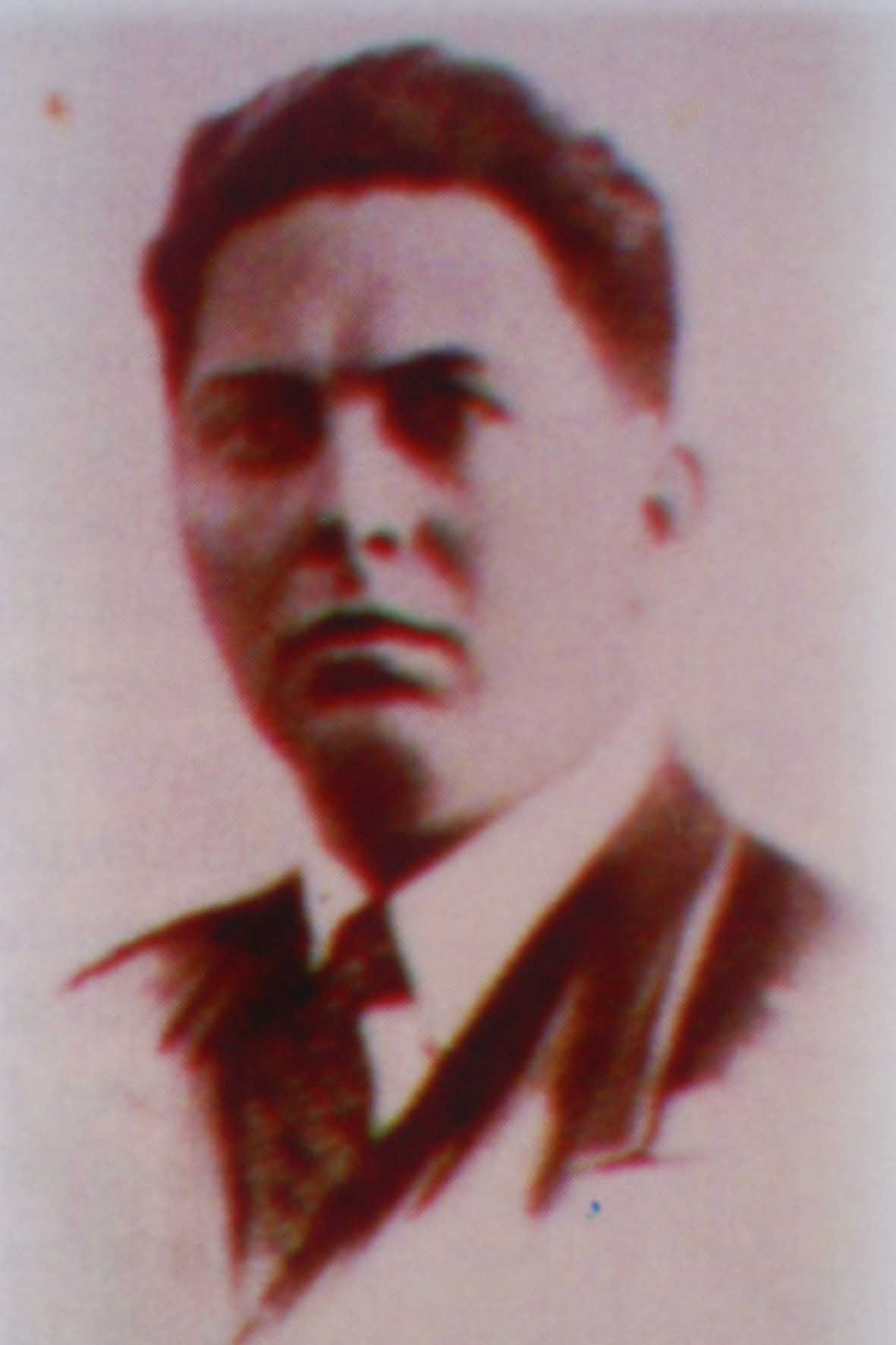

Personal details
- Born: 28 May 1897
- Died: 7 February 1963 (aged 65)

Justo Pastor Benítez (28 May 1897 – 7 February 1963) was a Paraguayan historian, writer, and Liberal politician.

== Biography ==
On 28 May 1897, Benítez was born in Asunción. He studied law at the Universidad Nacional de Asunción (where he would later be a professor), was editor for the El Liberal and El Diario periodicals from 1919 onwards, a national deputy between 1920 and 1927 and Minister of Justice in 1930; in the 1930s, he would occupy several other cabinet positions.

In the Liberal Party, he formed a group with Carlos Pastore, R. Antonio Ramos, Efraím Cardozo, and Julio César Chaves. In May 1932, as Foreign Minister and responding to Carlos Saavedra Lamas (the Argentine foreign minister)'s inquiry on Paraguayan intentions in the Chaco War, Benítez demanded that Bolivia adhered to the law of war and that the League of Nations monitored the conflict fairly. In June 1934, Benítez was replaced as, like his predecessor Daniel Sánchez Bustamante, he advocated for a peaceful resolution to the conflict; he switched posts with Rogelio Ibarra, remaining in Rio de Janeiro for the remainder of the conflict. In October 1938, he rejected the ambassadorship to Bolivia under Félix Paiva as a part of the Liberal refusal to join Paiva's proposed coalition.

In the late 1950s, he resided in Brazil. By then, he had served in various Liberal positions including national deputy, party director, and cabinet minister.

On 7 February 1963, he died in Asunción.

== Works ==
- Ideario Político. Asunción: Ed. Ariel. 1921.
- Jornadas democráticas. Asunción: Ed. Ariel. 1924. (Note: With José Patricio Guggiari as co-author.)
- Bajo el signo de Marte. 1934. (on the Chaco War)
- La vida solitaria del dr. José Gaspar de Francia, dictador del Paraguay. Buenos Aires: Librería y editorial "El Ateneo". 1937.
- Benítez, Justo Pastor (1957). "La Revolucion Paraguaya del 15 de mayo de 1811: Ensayo de interpretacion". Revista de Historia de América (43): 114–128. ISSN 0034-8325. JSTOR 20137149.
- Cardozo, Efraím (1959). El Paraguay colonial: las raíces de la nacionalidad. Ediciones Nizza. (prologue)
- Benítez, Justo Pastor (1963). "El Colorido Folklore Paraguayo". Journal of Inter-American Studies. 5 (3): 371–377. doi:10.2307/165132. ISSN 0885-3118. JSTOR 165132.
- Los comuneros del Paraguay, 1640-1735. Asunción: Editorial Casa-Libro. 1976.

=== Undated ===
- La constitución de 1870
- Ensayo sobre el liberalismo
- La cuenca del Plata
- Estigarribia, el soldado del Chaco
- El solar guaraní
- Carlos Antonio López
- La revolución de Mayo en Paraguay
- Mancebos de la tierra

== See also ==
- Bolivia–Paraguay relations
- History of Paraguay

== Sources ==
=== Bibliography ===
- Barager, Joseph R. (1959). "The Historiography of the Río de la Plata Area Since 1830". The Hispanic American Historical Review. 39 (4): 588–642. doi:10.2307/2510383. ISSN 0018-2168. JSTOR 2510383.
