= Raúl Latorre =

Paraguayan politician (born 1983)

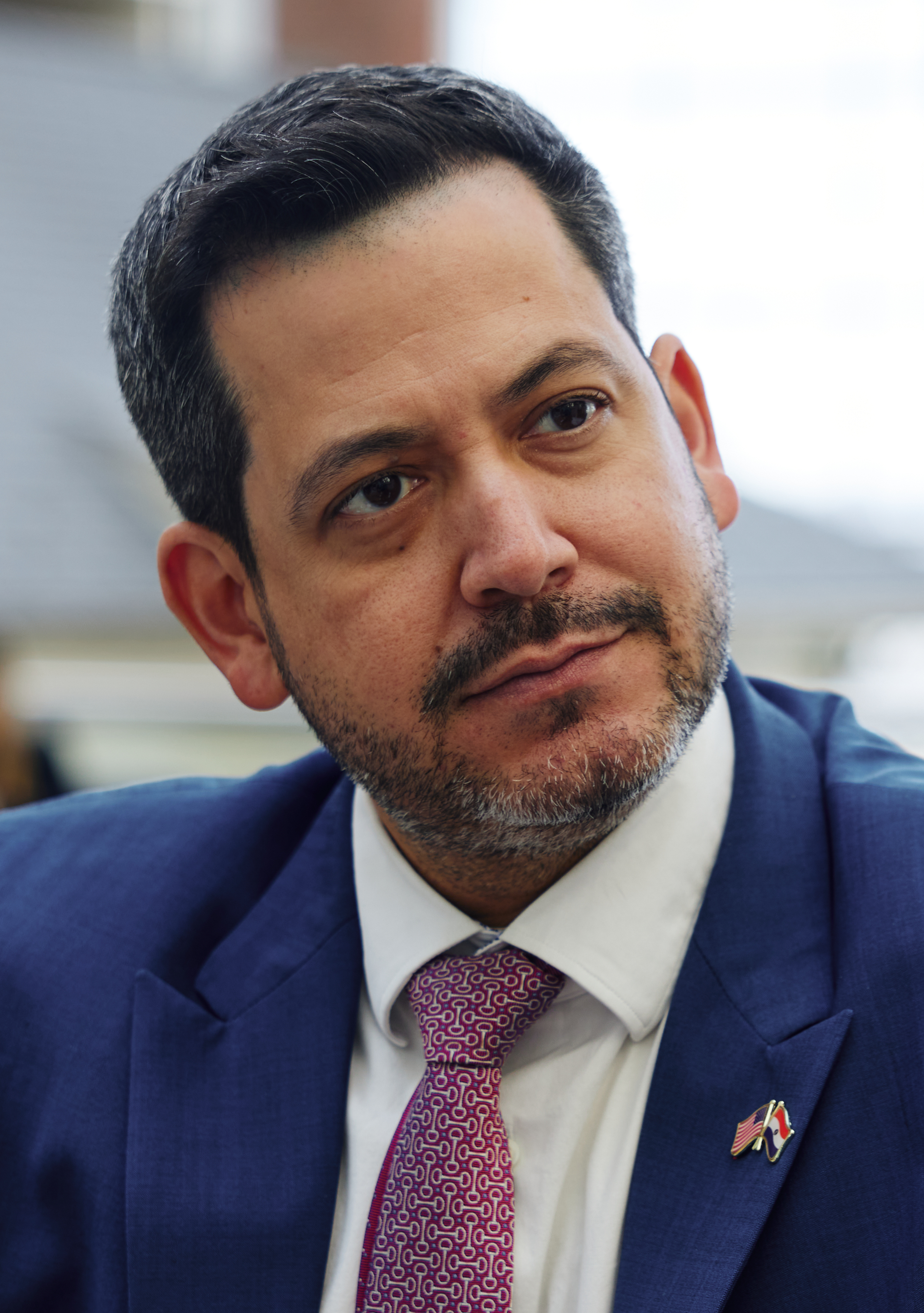
- Latorre in 2025

President of the Chamber of Deputies of Paraguay
- Incumbent
- Assumed office 1 July 2023
- Preceded by: Carlos María López

Member of the Chamber of Deputies of Paraguay
- Incumbent
- Assumed office 1 July 2018
- Constituency: Asunción

Personal details
- Born: 8 January 1983 (age 42)
- Political party: Colorado
- Education: University of Buenos Aires (PhD)

Raúl Luis Latorre Martínez (born 8 January 1983) is a Paraguayan politician who has served as President of the Chamber of Deputies of Paraguay since 2023, and in the chamber as a member of the Colorado Party since 2018. Prior to his tenure in the chamber he worked for the Ministry of Health.

== Early life ==
Raúl Luis Latorre Martínez was born on 8 January 1983. He graduated from the University of Buenos Aires with a doctorate in medicine and surgery, has a master's degree in strategic planning, and conducted postgraduate studies in the social doctrine of the Catholic Church.

== Career ==
Prior to Latorre's election to the Chamber of Deputies of Paraguay he worked for the Ministry of Health and was director general of Health Services and Networks.

Latorre is a member of the Colorado Party and a part of the Honor Colorado faction led by Horacio Cartes. He was elected to the chamber in the 2018 election. He declined to run for mayor of Asunción in the 2021 and 2025 elections.

On 30 June 2023, Latorre was elected president of the chamber with 58 votes in favour and was reelected in 2024 and 2025. In 2020, he became chair of the Permanent Commission of the Congress of Paraguay.

During Latorre's tenure in the chamber he was a member of the Public Health, Budget, and Energy and Mining committees. He was vice chair of the Human Rights committee and chair of the Justice, Labor and Social Security committee. He participated in the 2024 Conservative Political Action Conference in Budapest, Hungary, and attended the funeral of Pope Francis.

== Political positions ==
Latorre supports Israel and condemned the October 7 attacks. He is opposed to abortion rights. He supports Edmundo González and recognized him as the winner of the 2024 Venezuelan presidential election.

== Works cited ==
=== News ===
- "Colorados imponen acuerdo y Raúl Latorre es electo titular de Diputados". Última Hora. 30 June 2023. Archived from the original on 26 June 2025.
- "Comitiva paraguaya ya está en Roma para el funeral del papa Francisco". El Nacional. 25 April 2025. Archived from the original on 26 June 2025.
- "Diputado Raúl Latorre presidirá la Comisión Permanente del Congreso". Última Hora. 18 December 2020. Archived from the original on 26 June 2025.
- "Dr. Latorre, evasivo ante muertes por tabaco". ABC Color. 6 December 2017. Archived from the original on 26 June 2025.
- "Hegemonía cartista: Raúl Latorre es electo por tercera vez como titular de Diputados". Última Hora. 4 March 2025. Archived from the original on 26 June 2025.
- "Latorre llevó saludo al Papa y reafirmó defensa a la vida". Última Hora. 27 August 2024. Archived from the original on 26 June 2025.
- "Latorre niega candidatura a intendencia de Asunción". Última Hora. 23 December 2020. Archived from the original on 26 June 2025.
- "Latorre reafirma el compromiso de Paraguay en la lucha contra el antisemitismo". El Nacional. 27 March 2025. Archived from the original on 26 June 2025.
- "Latorre recibe con honores a Abascal, un político conservador de España". Última Hora. 12 June 2025. Archived from the original on 26 June 2025.
- "Oficialista Raúl Latorre es elegido por tercera vez presidente de Cámara Baja de Paraguay". SWI swissinfo. 4 March 2025. Archived from the original on 26 June 2025.
- "Presidente de Diputados reafirma respaldo a opositor venezolano Edmundo González". Última Hora. 6 January 2025. Archived from the original on 26 June 2025.
- "Raúl Latorre descarta candidatura a la intendencia de Asunción". El Nacional. 16 October 2024. Archived from the original on 26 June 2025.

=== Web ===
- "Paraguay". Inter-Parliamentary Union. Archived from the original on 26 June 2025.
- "Raúl Luis Latorre Martínez". Chamber of Deputies of Paraguay. Archived from the original on 26 June 2025.
