= Raúl Casal Ribeiro =

Paraguayan politician (1887-1956)

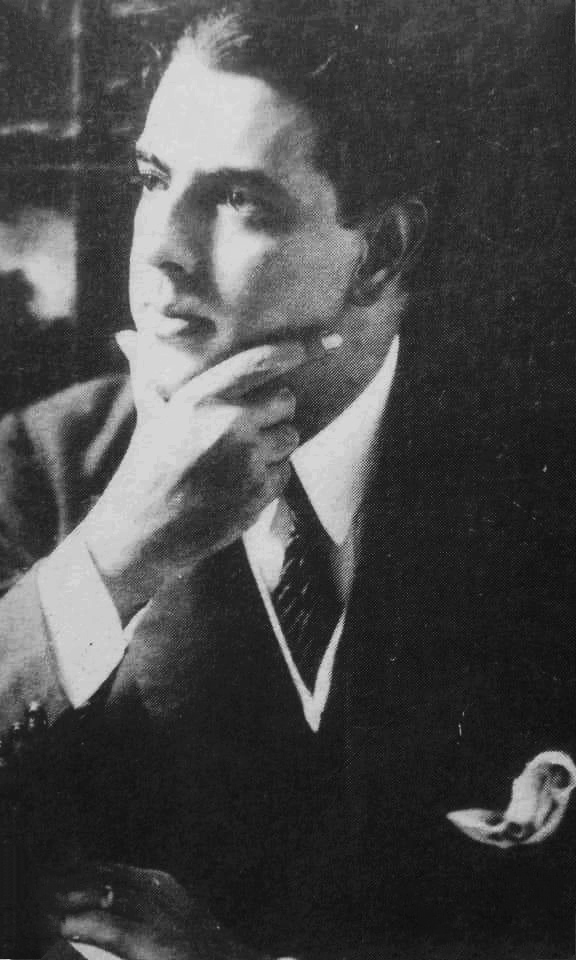

Vice President of Paraguay
- In office 15 August 1932 – 17 February 1936
- President: Eusebio Ayala
- Preceded by: Emiliano González Navero
- Succeeded by: Luis Alberto Riart

Minister of War and Navy of Paraguay
- In office 15 April 1931 – 25 October 1931
- Preceded by: Manlio Schenoni
- Succeeded by: Luis Alberto Riart

Senator of Paraguay
- In office 15 August 1932 – 19 February 1936

Minister of Foreign Affairs of Paraguay
- In office 1931–1932
- Preceded by: Higinio Arbo
- Succeeded by: Jerónimo Zubizarreta

National Deputy of Paraguay
- In office 1923–1925
- In office 1928–1931
- Constituency: Pilar

Personal details
- Born: 14 August 1887 Asunción, Paraguay
- Died: 1956 Paraguay
- Party: Liberal Party
- Spouse: Ana Hortensia Gautier

Raúl Casal Ribeiro Velazco (14 August 1887 – 1956) was a Paraguayan politician; he was vice president of Paraguay between 1932 and 1936, during Eusebio Ayala's government. His term was heavily marked by the Chaco War with Bolivia, which lasted between 1932 and 1935.

== Biography ==
His father, Joaquín Casal-Ribeiro, was a Brazilian naval officer who participated in the Paraguayan War and later immigrated to Paraguay, and his mother, Elodia Velazco, was Uruguayan. He studied in the Colegio Nacional de la Capital in Asunción, Paraguay's capital and his birthplace. He had an active life in the student movement as he studied law in the Universidad Nacional de Asunción, wrote for various newspapers and joined the Liberal Party in his youth. He taught in various schools, including the Paraguayan military school. Between 1923 and 1925, and 1928 and the early 1930s he was a national deputy, serving a term as president of the chamber. Between 1924 and 1928, he was Chief of Police for Asunción, and it was during his term its still-existing Mounted Group was created. He was a member of the Ateneo Paraguayo.

In the late 1920s, he was made Minister of War and Navy (amidst tensions with general Schenoni, the previous minister, and the Liberal administration) and Minister of Foreign Affairs. These were very important positions then because of Paraguay's border tensions with Bolivia and the military rearmament program that accompanied them. These eventually led to the Chaco War (1932-1935), a conflict which closely matched his term as vice president of Paraguay; he was Eusebio Ayala's running mate. During this period he was also President of the Senate; their government lasted until the February Revolution in 1936. During newly-installed president Rafael Franco's term, he left the country, returning only when Franco was deposed in August 1937. In 1940, when dictator Higinio Morínigo took power, he once again left the country, heading to Argentina, where he resided until 1952, when he finally returned to Paraguay during his friend Federico Chaves's presidency. He died in 1956.

Preceded by Emiliano González Navero	Vice President of Paraguay; 1932-1936	Succeeded by Luis Alberto Riart
