= Fátima Mereles =

Paraguayan botanist

Fatima Mereles
- Born: María Fátima Mereles Haydar; 1953 (age 72–73); Asunción
- Known for: Director of the Department of Biology at National University of Asunción

Academic background
- Education: University of Geneva
- Thesis: "Estudios en el mosaico de vegetación: bosque-sabanas palmares-humedales en el Chaco boreal, Paraguay" (1998)

Fatima Mereles (born 26 May 1953) is a botanist and academic from Paraguay, who specialises in wetland flora.

== Biography ==
María Fátima Mereles Haydar was born on 26 May 1953 in Asunción. She studied for an undergraduate degree in Biology at the National University of Asunción. She studied for a PhD at the University of Geneva and graduated in 1998. She is Director of the Department of Biology at National University of Asunción. She assumed leadership of CONACYT, Paraguay's National Council for Science and Technology, in 2009. She is also Secretary General of UNESCO's Man & Biosphere National Committee for Paraguay.

== Research ==
Mereles' main area of research focuses on Spermatophytes. She specialises in the flora of wetland areas of Paraguay, such as the Cerrado and the Gran Chaco. She has published over one hundred articles, as well as naming four new plant species: Eleocharis canindeyuensis; Eleocharis grandirostris; Eleocharis grossimucronata; Eleocharis occidentalis.

== Awards and honours ==
=== Honorary doctorate ===
In 2020 Mereles was awarded an honorary doctorate by the Universidad Autónoma de Encarnación to recognise her achievements in "national and international scientific research and development".

=== Eponym ===
The bromeliad Tillandsia mereliana is named after Mereles.
