= Ñemitỹrã =

Academic journal from Paraguay

- Discipline: Linguistics, education
- Language: English, French, German, Guarani, Portuguese, Spanish
- Edited by: Valentina Canese

Publication details
- History: 2019-present
- Publisher: Universidad Nacional de Asunción (Paraguay)
- Frequency: Biannually

Standard abbreviations
- ISO 4: Ñemitỹrã

Indexing
- ISSN: 2707-1634 (print); 2707-1642 (web)

Links
- Journal homepage

Ñemitỹrã. Revista Multilingüe de Lengua, Sociedad y Educación is a biannual peer-reviewed academic journal published by the Higher Institute of Languages, School of Philosophy, National University of Asunción. It contains articles on language, society, and education. The editor-in-chief is Valentina Canese Caballero.

The journal is published in February and August. The articles are in Spanish, Guarani, English, French, German, or Portuguese.

== Abstracting and indexing ==
The journal is abstracted and indexed in:

- Crossref
- Google Scholar
- LatinREV
- ROAD
- DOAJ
