= Uruguayan Institute of Meteorology =

- titutet Instituto Uruguayo de Meteorología
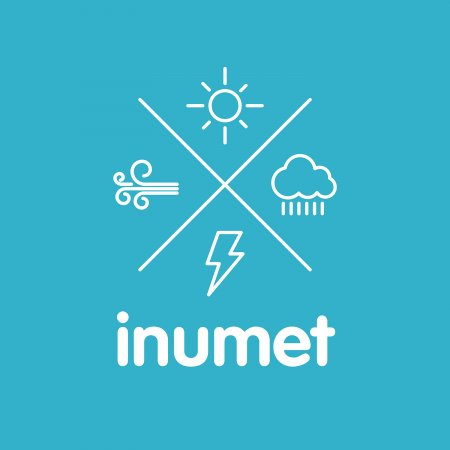

Agency overview
- Formed: October 25, 2013; 12 years ago
- Preceding agencies: National Directorate of Meteorology; General Directorate of Meteorology
- Jurisdiction: Uruguay
- Headquarters: Barrios Amorín 1488, Montevideo
- Agency executive: Pablo Daniel Cabrera García, President
- Website: www.inumet.gub.uy

The Uruguayan Institute of Meteorology (Spanish: Instituto Uruguayo de Metereología) or INUMET for short, is the weather agency that provides meteorological and climatological services to Uruguay. It is also the aeronautical meteorological authority of the country in application of the Convention on International Civil Aviation (ICAO).

== History ==
=== Background ===
In 1882, Monsignor Luigi Giuseppe Lasagna, then founder and headmaster of the Colegio Salesiano Pío Nono, installed the first Meteorological and Climatological Observatory of Montevideo in Villa Colón. However, it was the Italian professor Luis Morandi, who was appointed in 1886 as director of the Colegio Pío Observatory, who began to consolidate a wide network of meteorological stations throughout the country in order to create a technical and official body.

Former Municipal Meteorological Observatory in barrio Prado. It is currently part of the Suárez Presidential Residence.

On July 5, 1895, a new meteorological station began operating in Ciudad Vieja, near the Bay of Montevideo, and its objective was to carry out climatological studies for the port reform projected on that date. In 1901 the Prado Municipal Observatory was founded and between 1902 and 1910 the first meteorological surveys in South America were carried out.

In 1925 the National Observatory was founded, which brought together the Prado and the Ciudad Vieja. In the 1920s, the Observatory, which was already called the Uruguayan Meteorological Service (Spanish: Servicio Meteorológico del Uruguay), began to be located on the third floor of the Faculty of Humanities and Sciences of the University of the Republic. In 1970 it was installed in its current headquarters, located on Javier Barrios Amorín Street, where the Uruguay Sanatorium used to work. In 1934 it became dependent on the Ministry of National Defense. Since 1950, Uruguay has been a member of the World Meteorological Organization (WMO), a body dependent on the United Nations. Flight protection also began at the newly opened Carrasco Airport.

With the approval of the 1967 Constitution, the Meteorological Service of Uruguay was renamed the General Directorate of Meteorology. After several years later, in 1979, the civil-military regime changed its name again to the National Directorate of Meteorology (DNM).

=== Current body ===
On October 25, 2013, through Law No. 19158, the Uruguayan Institute of Meteorology was created, which had more autonomy for the development of its public activity, thereby replacing the National Meteorology Directorate, which was dependent of the Ministry of Defense. According to the law, its purpose is to "provide public meteorological and climatological services, consisting of observing, recording and predicting the weather and climate in the national territory and adjacent oceanic areas and other spaces of interest, in accordance with the applicable agreements, in order to contribute to the safety of people and goods and to the sustainable development of society".

== Weather stations ==
Currently, INUMET has 25 weather stations that extended across the country and Antarctica.

- Ángel Adami Airport
- Antarctica - Artigas Base
- Artigas
- Atlántida
- Colonia
- Durazno
- Florida
- National Institute of Agricultural Research - Durazno
- National Institute of Agricultural Research - La Estanzuela
- National Institute of Agricultural Research - Las Brujas
- National Institute of Agricultural Research - Salto Grande
- National Institute of Agricultural Research - Tacuarembó La Magnolia
- Laguna del Sauce
- Lavalleja
- Melo
- Mercedes
- Paso de los Toros
- Paysandú
- Prado
- Rivera
- Rocha
- San Jacinto
- Tacuarembó
- Treinta y Tres
