= Juan Andrés Gelly y Obes =

Argentine general and politician (1815–1904)

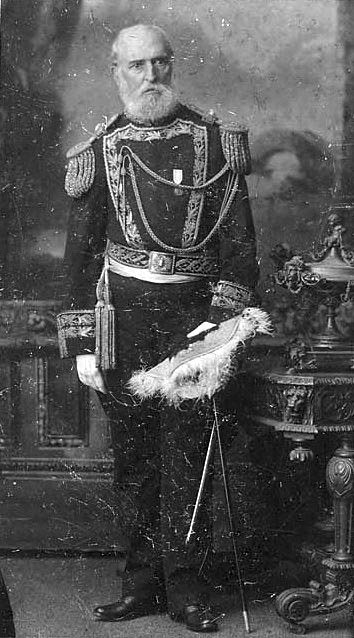

Minister of War and Navy
- In office October 12, 1862 – November 1867
- President: Bartolomé Mitre
- Vice President: Marcos Paz
- Preceded by: Pastor Obligado
- Succeeded by: Wenceslao Paunero

Deputy of the Buenos Aires Province
- In office October 12, 1872 – September 26, 1874

Personal details
- Born: May 21, 1815 Buenos Aires, Buenos Aires Province, United Provinces
- Died: September 18, 1904 (aged 89) Buenos Aires, Buenos Aires Province, Argentina
- Party: Unitarian Party
- Parent: Juan Andrés Gelly (father)

Military service
- Allegiance: State of Buenos Aires; Argentina; Civic Union
- Branch: Argentine Army
- Years of service: 1843 – 1851; 1855 – 1874; 1877 – 1880; 1886 – 1890
- Rank: General
- Battles/wars: Platine War; Great Siege of Montevideo; Argentine Civil Wars; Battle of Cepeda; Battle of Pavón; Battle of Don Cristóbal; Paraguayan War; Siege of Humaitá; Battle of Tuyú Cué; Pikysyry campaign; Pikysyry maneuver; Revolution of 1874; Revolution of 1880; Revolution of the Park

Juan Andrés Gelly y Obes (1815–1904) was an Argentine general and politician. He was an advocate for the reform of the Constitution of Argentina in 1860, chief of staff of the Argentine Army during the Paraguayan War as well as a personal friend of Bartolomé Mitre.

== Biography ==
He was a teenager even when his father, Juan Andrés Gelly had to go into exile in Montevideo and taking his son with him due to the support he had given to the dictatorship of General Juan Lavalle and his opposition to Juan Manuel de Rosas. He then joined the defense against the siege that that city suffered for eight years, reaching the rank of colonel and head of a regiment of Argentine exiles. For some time after, he was exiled in Brazil, where he managed an estancia. During his stay in Montevideo, he established a close friendship with Bartolomé Mitre but, unlike Mitre, returned to Buenos Aires in 1855.

In Buenos Aires, he joined the Argentine Army with the rank of colonel, was a provincial deputy, commander of the Port of Buenos Aires, commander of the Navy of the State of Buenos Aires, and interim Minister of War and Navy during the battles of Cepeda and Pavón.

At the end of 1861 he was one of the diplomats sent by Miter to convince Justo José de Urquiza not to prevent the overthrow of President Santiago Derqui. He was a provincial senator in 1862, and promoted to the rank of general.

During Mitre's presidency he was Minister of War and Navy, a position he held until the end of 1867 which simultaneously occurred with the first half of the Paraguayan War. He was appointed Chief of Staff of the Argentine Army campaigning in Paraguay, which was why he resigned from his post as minister and then participated in the Battle of Tuyú Cué. President Domingo Sarmiento appointed him commander of the Argentine army in Paraguay, participating in the Pikysyry maneuver, although he resigned due to a strong altercation with the president shortly before the Sacking of Asunción. Due to his Paraguayan ancestry, he was proposed as a candidate to become president there after the war ended.

Some years later, he was the head of the national forces in Corrientes, where he fought General Nicanor Cáceres, who was trying to defend the constitutional governor from a revolution supported by President Mitre. He remained in the Corrientes Province, as chief of the army reserve in campaign, until the outbreak of the Jordanist Rebellion, directing one of the main columns in the war against him. He controlled part of the north of the Entre Ríos Province until the Battle of Don Cristóbal where he was defeated by López Jordán, although the latter had to withdraw at the end of the day due to the approach of more government forces. He was unable to prevent the rebel leader's march to Corrientes, where the rebellion would be decisively defeated.

He was a national deputy between 1872 and 1874, for the Mitre party, a position he resigned at the end of 1874 in order to participate in the Revolution of 1874 he also requested discharge from the Army. His participation in the revolution was secondary, although he was the chief of staff of the mitrista army defeated in the Battle of La Verde.

He was reinstated in the Army in 1877, by decree of President Nicolás Avellaneda, but was discharged again for his participation in the Revolution of 1880. He would only be reinstated at the end of the presidency of Julio Argentino Roca. Accompanying Mitre, he was part of the founding group of the Civic Union due to the Revolution of the Park.

During the presidency of José Evaristo Uriburu, he presided over the newly created Supreme War and Navy Council, which judged the conduct of officers of the Argentine Army and Navy. He supported the management of General Pablo Ricchieri for the military reform of 1901, which created the modern Argentine Army based on conscription.

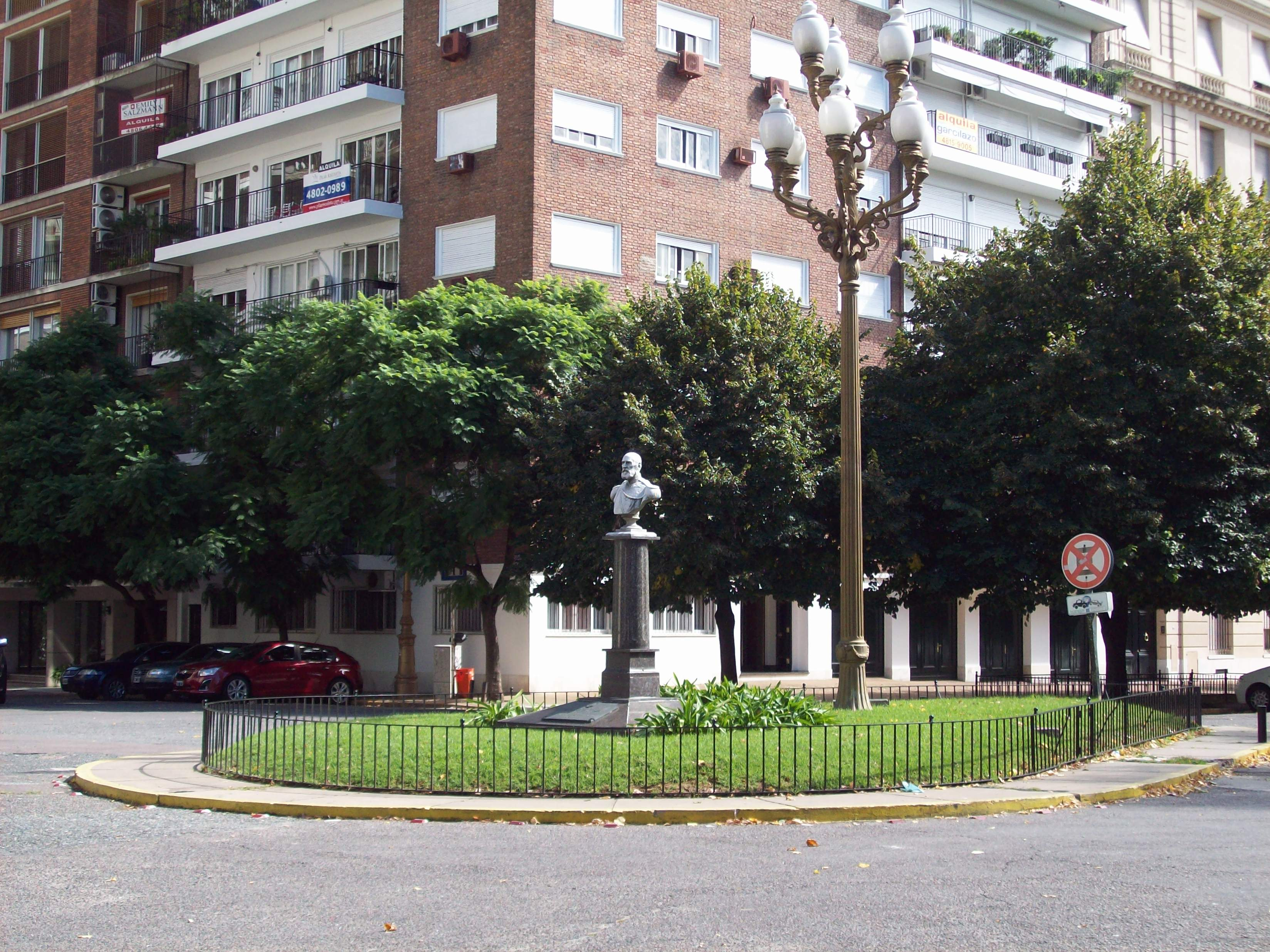
A small plaza with his name and bust in the city of Buenos Aires.

His death, on September 18, 1904, was a national public event. His remains were deposited in the Recoleta Cemetery, and his tomb was declared a Historical Monument.

A town in the Santa Fe Province and a street in the Recoleta neighborhood of the city of Buenos Aires bear his name.
