= Luis Alberto Riart =

Paraguayan politician

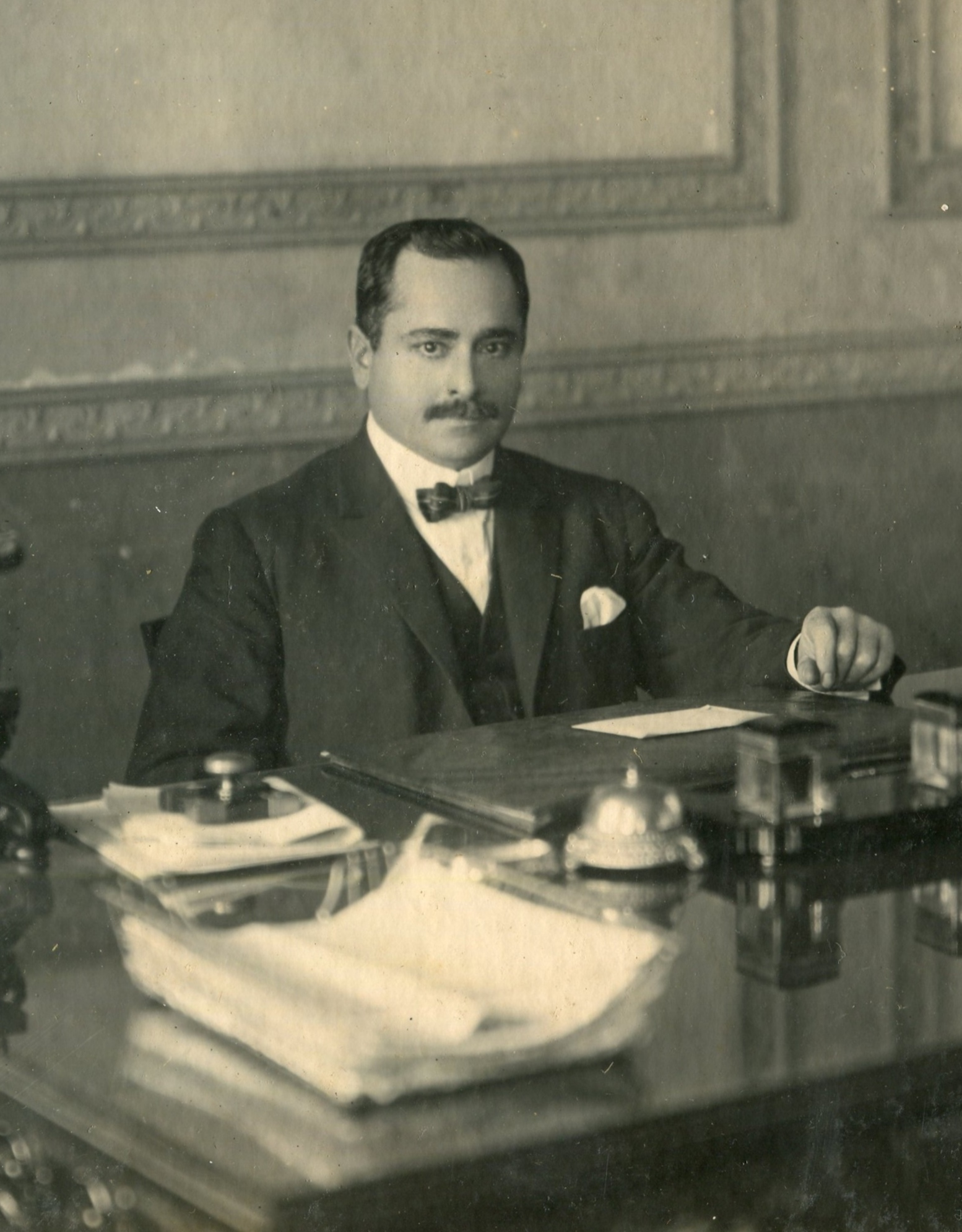

20th Vice President of Paraguay
- In office 15 August 1939 – 18 February 1940
- President: José Félix Estigarribia
- Preceded by: Raúl Casal Ribeiro (1936)
- Succeeded by: Post abolished Ángel Roberto Seifart (1993)

31st President of Paraguay
- In office 17 March 1924 – 15 August 1924
- Preceded by: Eligio Ayala
- Succeeded by: Eligio Ayala

Personal details
- Born: 21 June 1880 Esquina, Corrientes, Argentina
- Died: 1 October 1953 (aged 73) Asunción, Paraguay
- Party: Liberal

Luis Alberto Riart Vera (21 June 1880 – 1 October 1953) was a Paraguayan politician and President of Paraguay from 17 March 1924 to 15 August 1924.

== Biography ==
Between 1906 and 1916 he was President of the Instituto Paraguayo (Paraguayan Institute), Paraguay's foremost intellectual institution at the time. In 1913 he participated in the foundation of the Patriotic Union, of which he was in charge along with Emilio Aceval. He was in charge also of the Instituto de Alta Cultura Paraguayo-Argentino (Institute of Paraguayan-Argentine Culture).

He was Minister of Finance of Paraguay between 1916 and 1917.

In 1913 he was member of the Comisión de Códigos (Code Commission); in 1916 he was Minister of the Interior during the government of Manuel Franco.

Because he had some disagreements with José Pedro Montero, he left public service on August 25, 1919. On April 12, 1923 he was appointed Minister of Finance of Paraguay in the provisional cabinet of Eligio Ayala. In 1924 he was substitute in the War and Navy Department.

When Eligio Ayala renounced the presidency on March 17, 1924, Riart took charge of the government until August 15, and afterwards presented himself as candidate in the next elections.

His ministers were: Belisario Rivarola, in the Department of the Interior, Rogelio Ibarra in Foreign Relations, Lisandro Díaz de León in the Justice and Culture Department, Eliseo Da Rosa in the Treasury Department and Colonel Manlio Schenoni Lugo in War and Navy.

In education, he filled the empty seats in educational institutions with the help of Clementina Irrazábal and the Lieutenant Juan Manuel Garay.

In May 1924 the government recognized many teachers from the Escuela Normal of Barrero Grande and the distinguished teacher Pedro Aguilera was promoted to professor. The careers of Public Translator and Consular were incorporated to the study program of the Escuela de Comercio (Business School). In 1928 he presented his candidature to the presidency in the convention of his party, but lost by a few votes.

In 1931 he was Minister of Finance of Paraguay. In 1931 he occupied that position briefly during the government of González Navero, until 1932. José Patricio Guggiari appointed him as Economy Director.

Between 1935 and 1936 he was State Secretary during the government of Eusebio Ayala.

Being Chancellor, in 1935 he signed the agreement of Peace called Riart-Elio, that finished the border problem with Bolivia. On 21 July 1938 he signed the Agreement of Peace, Friendship and Limits with Bolivia. In 1939 he became Vice President of Paraguay in the cabinet of Marshal José Félix Estigarribia. Riart retired after the overthrow of the government on 18 February 1940.

Political offices
| Preceded by Eligio Ayala | President of Paraguay; 1924 | Succeeded by Eligio Ayala |
| Preceded by Raúl Casal Ribeiro | Vice President of Paraguay; 1939–1940 | Succeeded by Vacant |
