= Eligio Ayala =

President of Paraguay

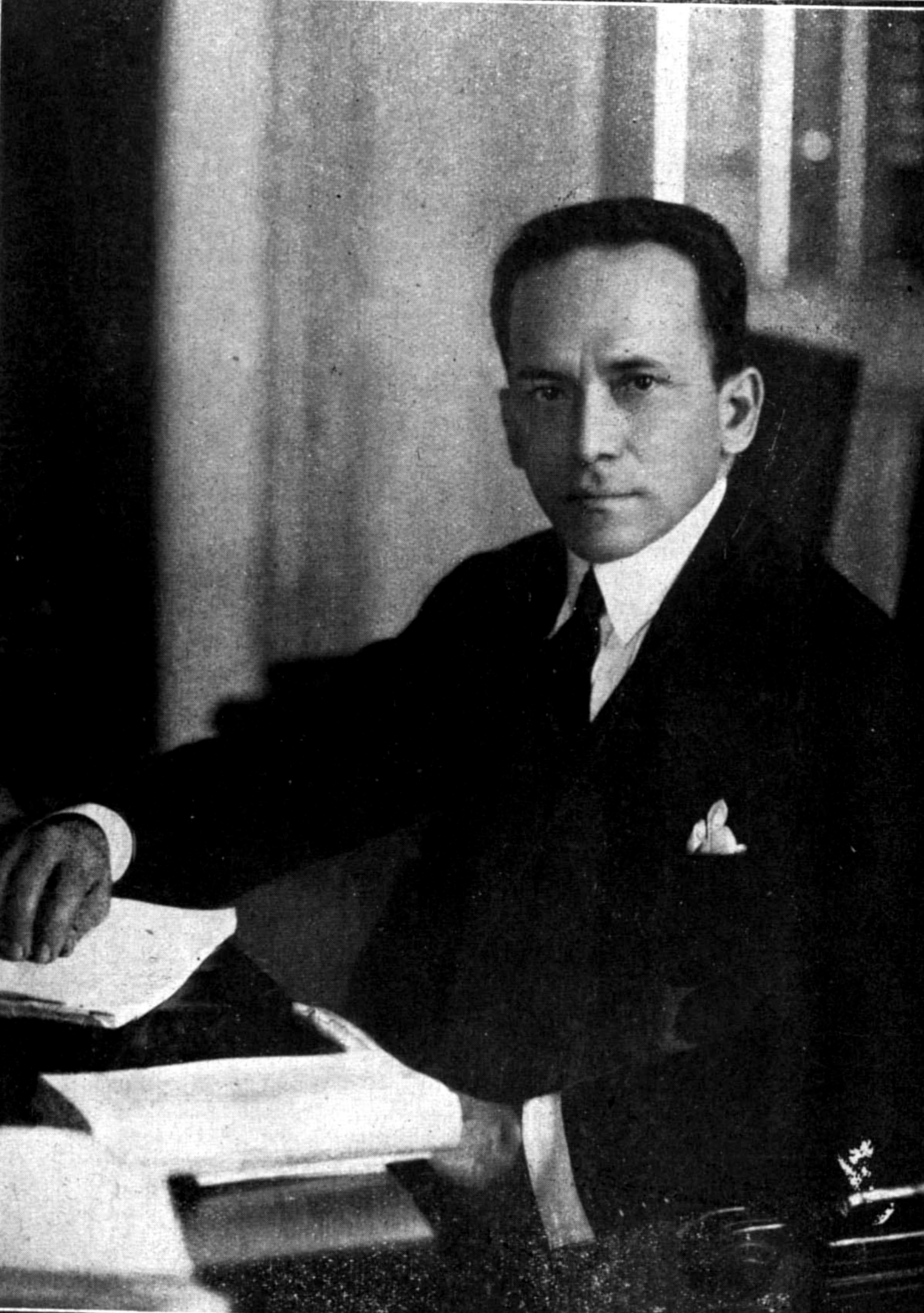
- Ayala in 1924

30th President of Paraguay
- In office 15 August 1924 – 15 August 1928
- Vice President: Manuel Burgos
- Preceded by: Luis Alberto Riart
- Succeeded by: José Patricio Guggiari
- In office 12 April 1923 – 17 March 1924
- Preceded by: Eusebio Ayala
- Succeeded by: Luis Alberto Riart

Personal details
- Born: 4 December 1879 Mbuyapey, Paraguay
- Died: 24 October 1930 (aged 50) Asunción, Paraguay
- Party: Liberal

José Eligio Ayala (4 December 1879 – 24 October 1930) was President of Paraguay from 12 April 1923 to 17 March 1924 and again from 15 August 1924 until 15 August 1928. He was a member of the Liberal Party.

== Life ==
Jose Eligio Ayala was born in Mbuyapey in the department of Paraguarí on 4 December 1879, son of Spanish Mariano Sisa and Paraguayan Manuela de Jesus Ayala. He was twin brother of Emilio de Jesus Ayala and brother of Eliseo's father, Juan Pablo, Juan Bautista and Manuel Sisa. He was the father of the son of Rosaura Abelardo Gonzalez and daughter Anastasia Candelaria Duplán. The Ayala family owned a farm with some dairy products, a pair of horses, hens, pigs, and a small ranch where they grew some vegetables.

His primary studies were conducted in his hometown and continued in Paraguarí. In 1897 he joined the National College of Encarnación, where his uncle Jose del Rosario Ayala, director of that institution, financed his studies because the Ayala family had limited economic resources. Culminating the third year, he moved to Asunción to enter the National College Asuncion, where he finished high school, helped by a grant from the government.

After completing the baccalaureate, he obtained a position as a classifier of official documents in the National Archives and joined the Faculty of Law and Social Sciences. There, he was president of the Students' Council of this house of studies in 1903. He earned his doctorate degree in law and Social Science 22 December 1905. While he was a student, he was taught mathematics and story in secondary schools.

In 1911 he left from the port of Buenos Aires (his place of exile) to Europe to continue his studies in philosophy, economics, aesthetics and philosophy law at the University of Heidelberg, Germany and Zürich Switzerland. In Berlin he wrote his book "Agricultural Evolution in England" and "The Paraguay seen from Europe." At the end of March 1920, after visiting Spain, Portugal and Argentina, he returned to Paraguay.

== Ayala's government ==
He was Minister of Finance of Paraguay from 1920 to 1921, and from 1921 to 1923.

In 1923, following the resignation of provisional president Eusebio Ayala, in the lawless years of the first half of the '20s, Eligio Ayala, who was appointed by Congress, assumed the provisional presidency of the Republic in April, 1923 initiating the pacification of the country after the revolution in 1921/22 and cleansing of public finances. On 3 February 1924, the Convention appointed him as Liberal candidate for the presidency of the Republic and to accompany him as vice president, he appointed Manuel Burgos, that would be the pair for elections that year.

On March 17, 1924, Ayala resigned from the provisional chairmanship noting: "I am grateful to your honor of the confidence to play a position of such serious responsibilities. I declare before you honorably that I have done so as not to defraud, in the midst of many and powerful contrarieties." ("Agradezco a vuestro honorabilidad la confianza para desempeñar un cargo de tan graves responsabilidades. Declaro ante vuestro Honorabilidad que he hecho para no defraudarla, en medio de muchas y poderosas contrariedades."). As the new president of the Congress, he appointed doctor Luis Alberto Riart as the new provisional president.

Eligio Ayala was a candidate in presidential elections, and as he did not have any opposition in the election, he assumed presidency of Republic of Paraguay, on 15 August 1924.

During his second government, the country experienced the best increase of work, production, export and a substantial improvement in the economic and financial situation in the history of the country. They approved an agreement with the bondholders of loans from 1871–72, the autonomy to the National University was given; the Faculty of Physics and Mathematics was created; treaties were signed Diaz-Leon Gutierrez, with Bolivia, and Ibarra-Mangabeira, with Brazil, supplementary to the treaty of 1872. The archdiocese of the Asuncion was created. They settled in Sajonia the Dockyards War and Navy; created the School of Aspiring Reserve Officers; created a School of Agriculture, and before the impending conflict in Chaco the gunboats "Humaitá" and "Paraguay" were acquired, armaments, etc.. When assuming his successor, José P. Guggiari, From 1928 to 1930, Eligio Ayala resumed as Minister of Finance of Paraguay. He was also author of some 14 books on various topics.

== Works during his government ==
- He adopted a Law on Establishment, Development and Conservation of small agricultural property.
- He enacted a law on Accidents at work, in addition to other related to Pensions and Retirement.
- Between 1924 and 1926 a considerable number of machines as plows, tractors, cultivators, seeders, etc. were brought.
- The financial representative in London signed an agreement with bondholders on borrowings made by Paraguay from 1871.

== Political biography ==
He served as the first judge in the Civil administration of justice. Previously he had served as prosecutor of crime and in 1907, began his political career to run for deputy, and was elected the following year. He became member of the parliament from the Liberal Party in 1908. He was elected President of the Chamber of Deputies on April 22, 1910. But political events later forced him to self exile to Argentina.

Eligio Ayala was mortally wounded in a crime of passion on 23 October 1930 and died on 24 October 1930.

Political offices
Preceded by Eusebio Ayala	President of Paraguay; 1923–1924	Succeeded by Luis Alberto Riart
Preceded by Luis Alberto Riart	President of Paraguay; 1924–1928	Succeeded by José Patricio Guggiari
