= Silvano Mosqueira =

Paraguayan writer

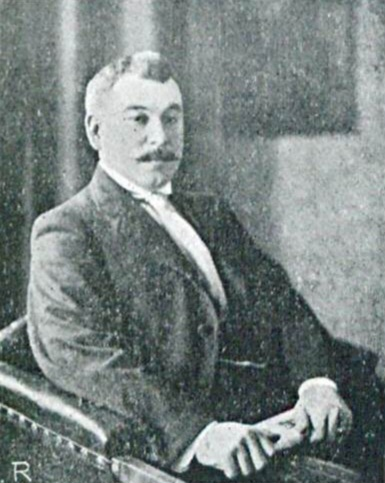
In 1917

Silvano Mosqueira (September 11, 1875 - August 15, 1954) was a Paraguayan writer.

== Selected works ==
- "General Joseph E. Diaz"
- "Loose Pages"
- "Portraits Paraguayan "
- "Ideal"
- "Impressions of America"
- "Female Silhouettes"
- "Juan Silvano Godoi: His Life and Work"
- "New Portraits"
- "Paraguay"
- "American Intellectual Exchange"
- "Communism in the Missions"
