= Diocese of Oea =

Titular See of the Roman Catholic Church

The Diocese of Oea (Latin: Dioecesis Oëensis) is a suppressed and titular See of the Roman Catholic Church.

== History ==
Oea, corresponding to the city of Tripoli in present-day Libya, is an ancient episcopal seat of the Roman province of Africa Nova, Tripolitania.

The diocese is still mentioned in the Notitiae Episcopatuum written by the Byzantine emperor Leo VI the Wise. (886–912)

== Bishops ==
- Natal † (cited in 256)
- Marinianus † (cited in 411) (donatist bishop)
- Saint Cresconius † (before 467 – after 484)

=== Titular bishops ===
- Bernardo Maria Beamonte, O.C.D. † (1728 – 1733)
- Francesco di Ottaiano, O.F.M. † (1735 – ?)
- Alessandro Grossi † (1876 – 1889)
- Luigi Giuseppe Lasagna, S.D.B. † (1893 – 1895)
- Jean-Baptiste Grosgeorge, M.E.P. † (1896 – 1902)
- Francesco Bacchini † (1905 – 1908)
- Vittore Maria Corvaia, O.S.B. † (1908 – 1913)
- Salvatore Ballo Guercio † (1920 – 1933 appointed bishop of Mazara del Vallo)
- Camille Verfaillie, S.C.I. † (1934 – 1980)
- Michel Louis Coloni † (11 May 1982 – 30 January 1989, appointed archbishop of Dijon)
- Michel Marie Jacques Dubost, C.I.M. (9 August 1989 – 7 March 1998)
- David Kamau Ng'ang'a, from 22 December 1999

== Bibliography ==
- Pius Bonifacius Gams, Series episcoporum Ecclesiae Catholicae, Leipzig, 1931, p. 467
- Stefano Antonio Morcelli, Africa christiana, Volume I, Brescia, 1816, pp. 249–250
- Konrad Eubel, Hierarchia Catholica Medii Aevi, vol. 5, p. 295; vol. 6, p. 316
- Joseph Mesnage, L'Afrique chrétienne, Paris, 1912, p. 164
