= Vicente Pistilli =

Paraguayan academic (1933–2013)

Vicente Pistilli Statunato (February 27, 1933 - December 7, 2013) was a Paraguayan academic who was a professor at the Universidad Nacional de Asunción.

Trained as a mathematician and engineer, Pistilli had a long fascination with the Pre-Columbian history of Paraguay. His book Vikings in Paraguay made a controversial historical case for early Nordic settlement in the country which some have alleged guided the Alfredo Stroessner government's discriminatory policies against the Aché.

Pistilli married Marta Simiano and had three sons.
