= Mbuyapey =

Mbuyapey Mbujapey (Guarani)
- Location within Paraguay
- Coordinates: 26°13′12″S 56°45′36″W
- Country: Paraguay
- Department: Paraguarí

Area
  - Total: 1,092 km^{2} (422 sq mi)

Population (2016)
  - Total: 14,512

Mbuyapey (Guarani: Mbujapey) is a district of the Paraguarí Department in Paraguay. It is located 182 km southeast of Asunción and has a population of around 14,512.

== Sources ==
- World Gazeteer: Paraguay – World-Gazetteer.com
