= Luigi Giuseppe Lasagna =

Luigi Giuseppe Lasagna S.D.B.
- Bishop of Oea
- Church: Roman Catholic Church
- See: Titular see of Oea
- In office: 1893–1895
- Predecessor: Alessandro Grossi
- Successor: Jean-Baptiste Grosgeorge M.E.P.
- Previous posts: Salesian Missionary in Uruguay and Brazil

Orders
- Ordination: 8 June 1873
- Consecration: 12 March 1893 by Cardinal Lucido Maria Parocchi

Personal details
- Born: 4 March 1850 Montemagno, Italy
- Died: 6 November 1895 (aged 45) Juiz de Fora, Brazil
- Denomination: Roman Catholic Church
- Occupation: bishop
- Profession: priest

Styles of Luigi Giuseppe Lasagna
- Reference style: His Excellency
- Spoken style: Your Excellency
- Religious style: Bishop

Luigi Giuseppe Lasagna, best known as Dom Luís (4 March 1850 – 6 November 1895) was an Italian Salesian priest and Titular Bishop of the Diocese of Oea from his appointment by Pope Leo XIII on 10 March 1893 until his death on 6 November 1895. He was the founder of the Salesian works in Brazil and Uruguay.

== Biography ==
Born in Montemagno in 1850, Lasagna entered Valdocco's oratory and was ordained a Catholic priest on 8 June 1873. With the help of Don Bosco he was sent as a missionary to Latin America in 1876. On 10 March 1893 he was appointed titular bishop of Oea and ordained on 12 March by Cardinal Lucido Maria Parocchi, choosing as his motto Sal agnis (pieces of salt).

Dom Luís began his missionary ministry in Uruguay and became director of the Colegio de Villa Colón. In 1881 he inaugurated a meteorological station, later founding a Catholic university and a high school of agriculture. In 1883 he started a ministry in Brazil.

He died in 1895 in Juiz de Fora, a victim of a railway accident, crushed by two trains of the Estrada de Ferro Central do Brasil. Seven nuns, five other priests and a stoker were also killed in the accident.

== Bibliography ==
- Paolo Albera, Mons. Luigi Lasagna: Memorie Biografiche, 1900.
- D. Barberis, Mons. Luigi Lasagna “Vale mecum”, San Benigno Canavese, 1901.
- Lorenzo Gentile, Missionsbischof Alois Lasagna, Salesianer 1850–1895, übersetzt durch Leo Schlegel, München, 1933
- Juan E. Belza, Luis Lasagna, el obispo misionero, 1969

== See also ==
- Missionary
- Salesians

Catholic Church titles
Preceded by Alessandro Grossi	Titular diocese of Oea; 1893–1895	Succeeded by Jean-Baptiste Grosgeorge M.E.P.
