= Eusebio Ayala =

Paraguayan politician (1875–1942)

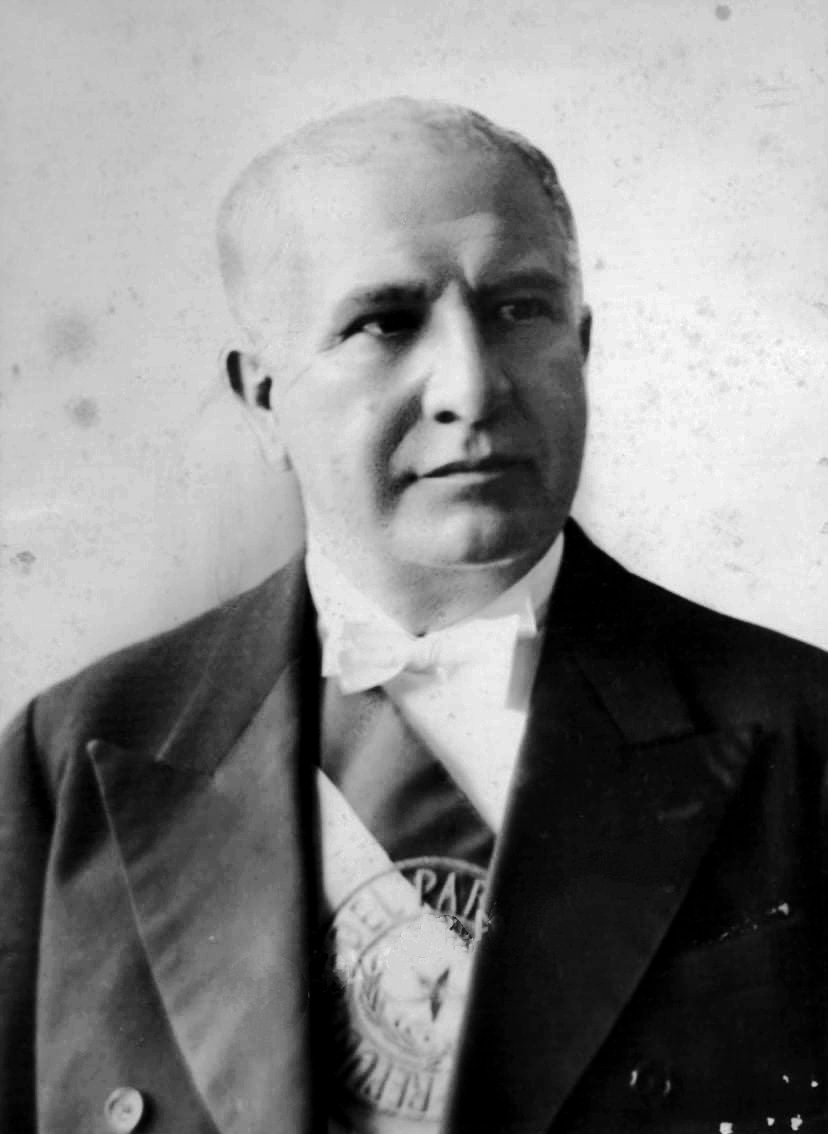
- Portrait, c. 1932

29th President of Paraguay
- In office 15 August 1932 – 17 February 1936
- Vice President: Raúl Casal Ribeiro
- Preceded by: José Patricio Guggiari
- Succeeded by: Rafael Franco
- In office 7 November 1921 – 12 April 1923
- Preceded by: Félix Paiva
- Succeeded by: Eligio Ayala

Personal details
- Born: 14 August 1875 Barrero Grande, Paraguay
- Died: 4 June 1942 (aged 66) Buenos Aires, Argentina
- Party: Liberal
- Spouse: Marcelle Durand
- Education: National College of Asunción

Eusebio Ayala Bordenave (14 August 1875 – 4 June 1942) was a Paraguayan politician who served as the 28th President of Paraguay from 7 November 1921 to 12 April 1923 and again from 15 August 1932 to 17 February 1936.

A member of the Liberal Party, Ayala led Paraguay through the Chaco War (1932–1935), which resulted in an upset victory against Bolivia, securing Paraguayan control over large parts of the disputed Gran Chaco region. In February 1936, however, Ayala was overthrown by Colonel Rafael Franco. He and General José Félix Estigarribia were jailed and sent into exile.

== Early life ==
Ayala was born in Barrero Guasu (Barrero Grande), Cordillera Department, Paraguay, on August 14, 1875; his parents were Abdón Bordenave and Casimira Ayala, his mother an illiterate adolescent of 19. His first schooling was in his hometown, with his aunt Benita. Then he moved to the country's capital, Asunción, where he worked as a trainee in a shop. He was able to enter the National College of Asunción and received his bachelor's degree in 1896. Ayala then taught classes in schools, through which he could afford his expenses at the College of Law, National University, where he graduated as Doctor of Social Science and Law in 1904, defending a thesis on the national budget.

After completing his university education, Ayala made several trips to Europe. The first was as secretary of the embassy of Great Britain for three years, time that he came to master English and French, and also improve his philosophical and cultural training. It was in one of those trips where he met the person who would be his future wife, Madame Marcelle Amelia Durand. She was born in Tours, France, January 16, 1889. She had gotten married at very young age to a Parisian jeweler, but he suffered from a mental problem that drove him to suicide, leaving Marcelle a childless widow. After the incident, she continued living in Paris, where she met Eusebio Ayala. Marcelle lived until her last days in Paraguay, dying in Asuncion on April 20, 1954. Her years close to the statesman were recorded in her book Memories.

== Early career ==
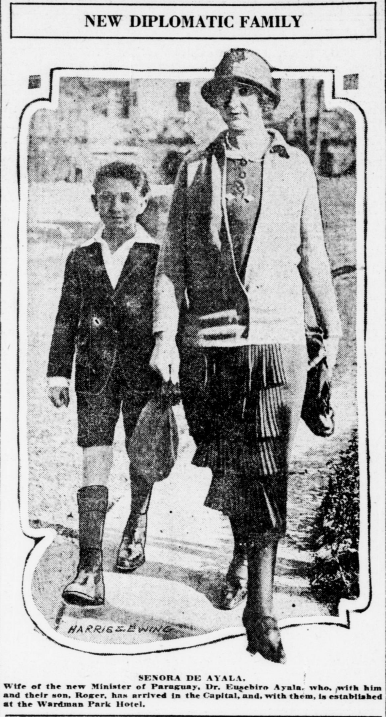
Ayala's wife and son in Washington, 1925.

Upon his return to Paraguay, he taught classes of Criminal Law and Constitutional Law at the Faculty of Law and he became Rector of the University of Asunción.

As a journalist he worked at El Diario and El Liberal, and later he was editor of the Journal of Law and Social Sciences. Jose P. Guggiari appointed him ambassador to the United States. He was remembered, as the only Paraguayan of that era who gave a lecture in The Sorbonne, Paris, on the uti possidetis in French. Fruit of his research in finance, he wrote a book which he called "Monetary issues and related topics" in 1917.

== Politics ==
In his long political career he was legal adviser to major corporations, deputy, senator, minister of Finance, Justice, Worship and Education and Foreign Affairs. He was Minister of Finance of Paraguay in 1916 and in 1919. He served as President of the Chamber of Deputies in 1909.

He joined the Liberal Party in 1908 and campaigned in the "radical" sector. During the presidency of Emiliano González Navero, in 1909, he was appointed chancellor, a position he also held in following governments. He was also one of the founders of the Paraguayan Society of International Law and became a delegate of the International Financial Conference, held in Buenos Aires in 1916.

== Government ==
Following the resignation of President Manuel Gondra, the National Congress named Eusebio Ayala as temporary president on November 7, 1921, due to a political crisis and the impossibility of forming a government by Vice President Félix Paiva. Ayala served in this position until April 12, 1923. These were extremely difficult times for the country, and Ayala's presidency played a role in the civil war of 1922, during which he resigned his post and defeated political opponents who staged an insurrection after Ayala blocked their attempts to hold a presidential election.

Ayala became president again between August 15, 1932 and February 17, 1936. He came into office just when the Chaco War with Bolivia (1932–1935) was beginning. Ayala visited the battlefront several times during the war, and the Paraguayan forces ultimately won despite being outmanned and under-equipped. For this, he was called "President of Victory."

The war consumed most of the energy of the Government during Ayala's second term, but he undertook some other tasks as president, such as the formalization of the restored version of the National Anthem. During the war, he held the three main pillars of his policy: As Commander-in-Chief, along with General José Félix Estigarribia, he led successful campaigns of the Army; implemented a progressive system of expenses; and maintained a diplomatic directive with the strong desire to achieve peace with dignity.

After the war, a military movement overthrew Ayala's presidency on February 17, 1936, a few months before the end of his term. He was imprisoned and then exiled, relocating to Buenos Aires.

== Exile and later years ==
Accompanied by General Estigarribia, Dr. Eusebio Ayala left Paraguay on September 5, 1936, to Buenos Aires, where his wife and a reception with all the honors were waiting for him. He resumed his professional activities by the year 1938. He joined a major law firm in Buenos Aires, and led the Argentine–Paraguayan Chamber. He also wrote for La Razon, a local newspaper. His son, Roger, had finished his studies and lived with his parents. Ayala returned to Asuncion to do some work business, and took advantage of this opportunity to visit his sister.

Ayala died in Buenos Aires on June 4, 1942. To commemorate him the old San Lorenzo street and his hometown in Paraguay were renamed after him, on June 17, 1942.

On September 28, 1992, the remains of Eusebio Ayala arrived on a special flight at Silvio Pettirossi international airport from Buenos Aires. A vehicle of the Army transported the urn to the “Palacio de Lopez”, under the greeting of the Paraguayan flags. On September 29, 1992, the Ayala's remains finally rested in the National Pantheon of the Heroes in Asuncion.

Political offices
Preceded by Manuel Gondra	President of Paraguay; 1921–1923	Succeeded by Eligio Ayala
Preceded by José Patricio Guggiari	President of Paraguay; 1932–1936	Succeeded by Rafael Franco
