= Universidad Nacional de Asunción =

University in Paraguay

Coordinates: 26°20′08″S 57°31′14″W

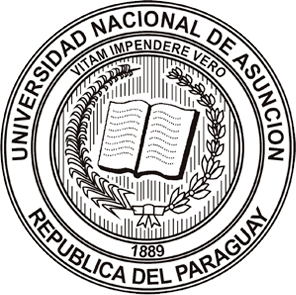
- Motto: Vitam Impendere Vero
- Type: Public
- Established: 1889; 137 years ago
- Rector: Zully Concepcion Vera de Molinas
- Students: 54,125 (2024)
- Location: San Lorenzo, Central, Paraguay
- Website: www.una.py

The Universidad Nacional de Asunción (UNA) is a public research university in San Lorenzo, Paraguay. Founded in 1889, it is the oldest university in the country. The academic community, as of 2024, consists of 44,654 enrolled students and approximately 9,000 faculty members. Its main campus, located in the city of San Lorenzo, spans 300 hectares, making it the largest university campus in the country.

The UNA consistently ranks as the number one higher education institution in Paraguay in international academic metrics, including the QS Latin America University Rankings and the AD Scientific Index.

== History and evolution ==
The Universidad Nacional de Asunción (UNA) was founded in 1889. It is the country's first and oldest university. Initially, it only comprised the Faculties of Law, Medicine, and Mathematics, as well as the Schools of Notary Public, Pharmacy, and Obstetrics.

Over the subsequent 137 years, the university added the faculties of Chemical Sciences, Dentistry, Engineering, Economic Sciences, Philosophy, Agrarian Sciences, Veterinary Sciences, Exact and Natural Sciences, Architecture, Design and Art, Nursing and Obstetrics, Social Sciences, and the "Facultad Politecnica".

The UNA was the only university in Paraguay until 1960, when the "Universidad Catolica 'Nuestra Señora de la Asuncion'" was founded.

As of 2025, the UNA comprises 14 faculties and several institutes offering 78 degree programs across various fields of study, providing the most comprehensive range of higher education opportunities in Paraguay.

It also has several technology centers and research facilities for the academic community, both for conducting scientific research, and for the development of postgraduate studies.

== Organization ==
The university campus is spread throughout Paraguay, with centers in Pedro Juan Caballero, Caacupé, San Juan Bautista, Santa Rosa Misiones, Caazapá, Villarrica, Coronel Oviedo, Caaguazú, Paraguarí, Villa Hayes, San Pedro, San Estanislao, Cruce Los Pioneros (Boquerón) and Benjamín Aceval, in addition to the main campus in San Lorenzo and institutes in Asunción.

The university also operates the "Hospital de Clínicas", the primary teaching hospital affiliated with the Faculty of Medical Sciences, as well as two secondary schools, the "Colegio Experimental Paraguay-Brasil (CEPB)" and the Instituto Paraguayo de Telecomunicaciones (IPT)

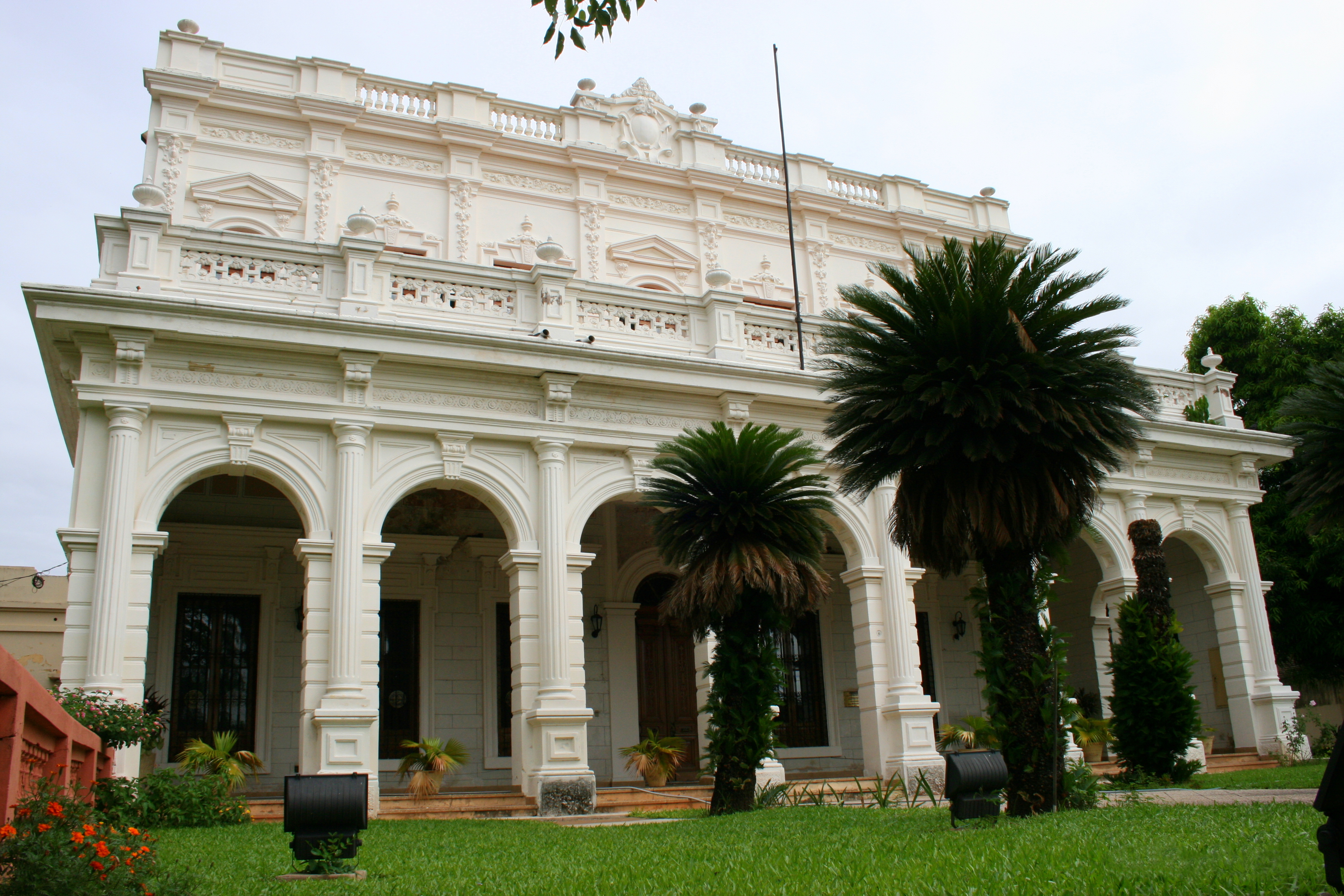
Rectorate of the National University of Asunción on Av. España.

=== Faculty ===
The university has fourteen faculties as of 2026:

- Faculty of Chemical Sciences
- Faculty of Medical Sciences (FCM-UNA)
- Faculty of Dentistry
- Faculty of Engineering (FIUNA)
- Faculty of Law and Social Sciences
- Faculty of Economic Sciences
- Faculty of Philosophy
- Faculty of Agrarian Sciences
- Faculty of Veterinary Sciences
- Polytechnic Faculty (FP-UNA)
- Faculty of Architecture, Design and Art (FADA-UNA)
- Faculty of Exact and Natural Sciences (FACEN-UNA)
- Faculty of Nursing and Obstetrics
- Faculty of Social Sciences

=== Institutes ===
- Institute of Arts
- Institute of Languages
- Institute of Research of Health Sciences

== Publications ==
Anales de la Facultad de Ciencias Medicas, the official publication of the faculty of medical sciences, established in 1927. It publishes clinical research, case studies, and medical advancements.

Reportes Científicos de la FACEN, published by the Faculty of Exact and Natural Sciences since 2010, features original research across disciplines such as biology, chemistry, physics, and mathematics.

In the 2020s, the Higher Institute of Languages started publishing Ñemitỹrã, an academic journal on language, society, and education.

The Faculty of Architecture, Design and Art issues Revista FADA, which focuses on academic production in architecture, urbanism, industrial design, and the visual arts.

== Notable alumni ==
- Eusebio Ayala - President of Paraguay.
- Fatima Mereles - Botanist and Academic.
- Vicente Pistilli - Historian, mathematician and engineer.
- Martín Almada – Human rights activist notable for uncovering the Archives of Terror.

== Partner universities ==
- Ching Yun University, Taiwan
- Taipei Medical University, Taiwan
- University of Rome, Italy

== See also ==
- List of universities in Paraguay
