= Natalicio Talavera =

Natalicio Talavera may refer to:

- Natalicio Talavera (poet), Paraguayan poet and journalist
- Natalicio Talavera, Paraguay, a town in the Guairá department, Paraguay, named for the poet
