= Villarrica, Paraguay =

City in Guairá, Paraguay

Villarrica
- City
- Villarrica del Espíritu Santo
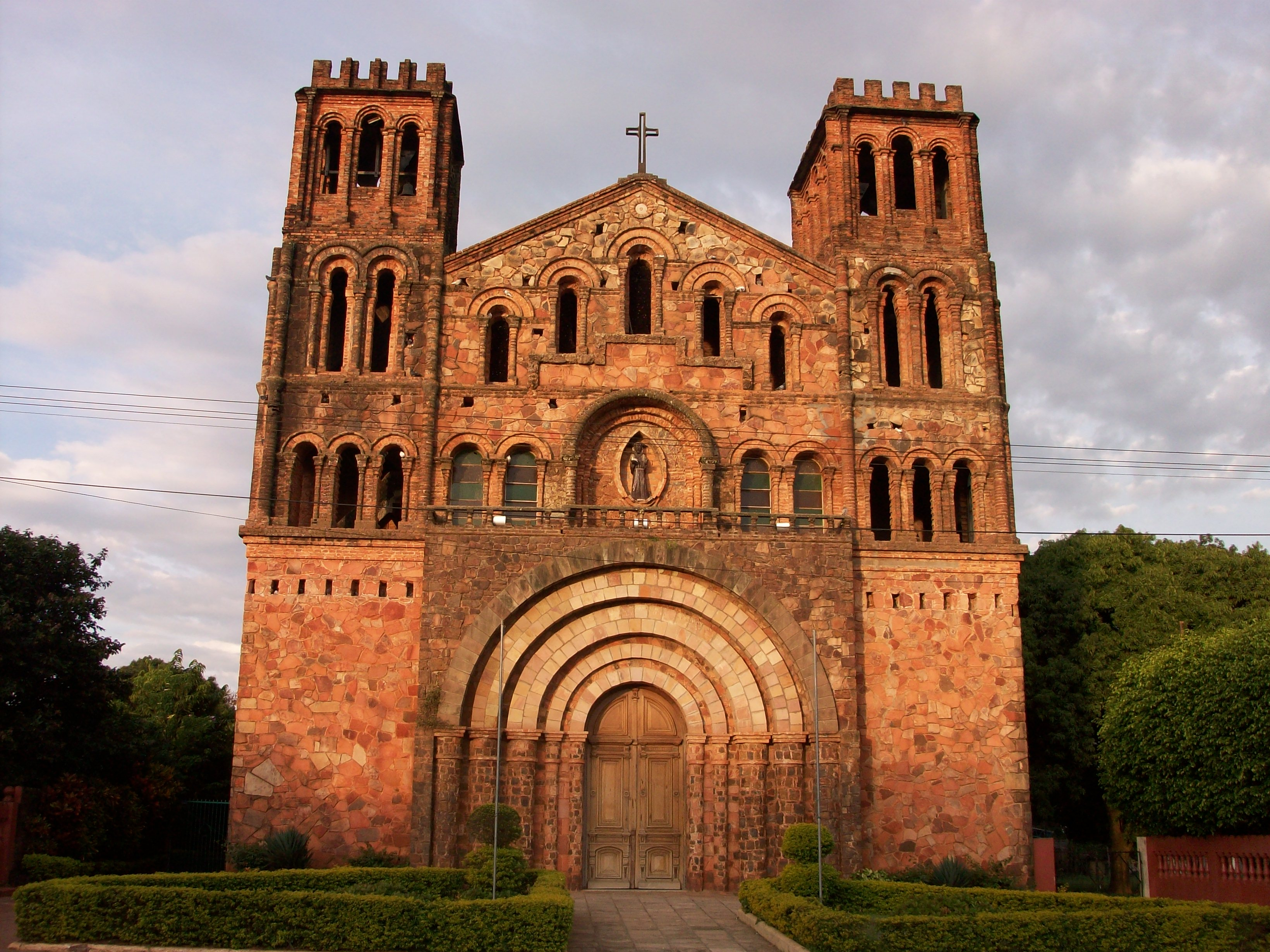
- Villarrica, Paraguay

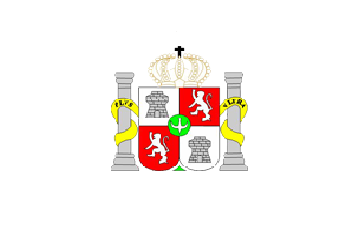
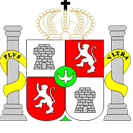
- Flag Coat of arms
- Nickname: Wandering City. Culture Capital.
- Motto: Plus Ultra (latin further beyond)
- Location within Paraguay
- Coordinates: 25°45′S 56°26′W
- Country: Paraguay
- Department: Guairá
- Founded: May 14, 1570
- Founder: Ruy Diaz Melgarejo

Government
  - Intendente Municipal: Magin Benítez (PLRA)

Area
  - Total: 247 km^{2} (95 sq mi)
- Elevation: 200 m (660 ft)

Population
  - Total: 74,355
  - Density: 301/km^{2} (780/sq mi)
- Time zone: UTC-03 (PYT)
- Postal code: 5000
- Area code: +595 (541)

Villarrica del Espíritu Santo (Spanish pronunciation: [ˌbiʎaˈrika ðel esˈpiɾitu ˈsanto]), is a city in Paraguay. Located in the middle of the Eastern Region of Paraguay, it is the capital and most populous city of Guairá Department.

Vilarrica is located to the center west of Guairá and is bordered to the east by the towns of Mbocayaty, Yataity, Independencia, Ñumí, and Garay, to the west by Itapé and Félix Pérez, and to the south by San Salvador and Borja.

Founded in 1570 by Sevillian Ruy Díaz de Melgarejo, it is one of the oldest settlements in Paraguay. Nevertheless, the original foundation site was located within the extinct Spanish province of Guayra in what is now the state of Parana in Brazil. The residents of Villarrica were forced to relocate seven times during a timespan of more than 100 years. These relocations were mainly caused by the repeated attacks from the neighbouring Portuguese bandeirantes but also by political and economic issues. They were finally settled in its current location near Ybytyruzu hills in 1683. As a result, the city got the nickname of "Wandering City".

After the end of the Paraguayan War in 1870, Villarrica experienced rapid economic and demographic growth, becoming the second most important city in Paraguay after the capital Asuncion. The city continues to be a well-known cultural hub today.

== History ==
=== Background ===
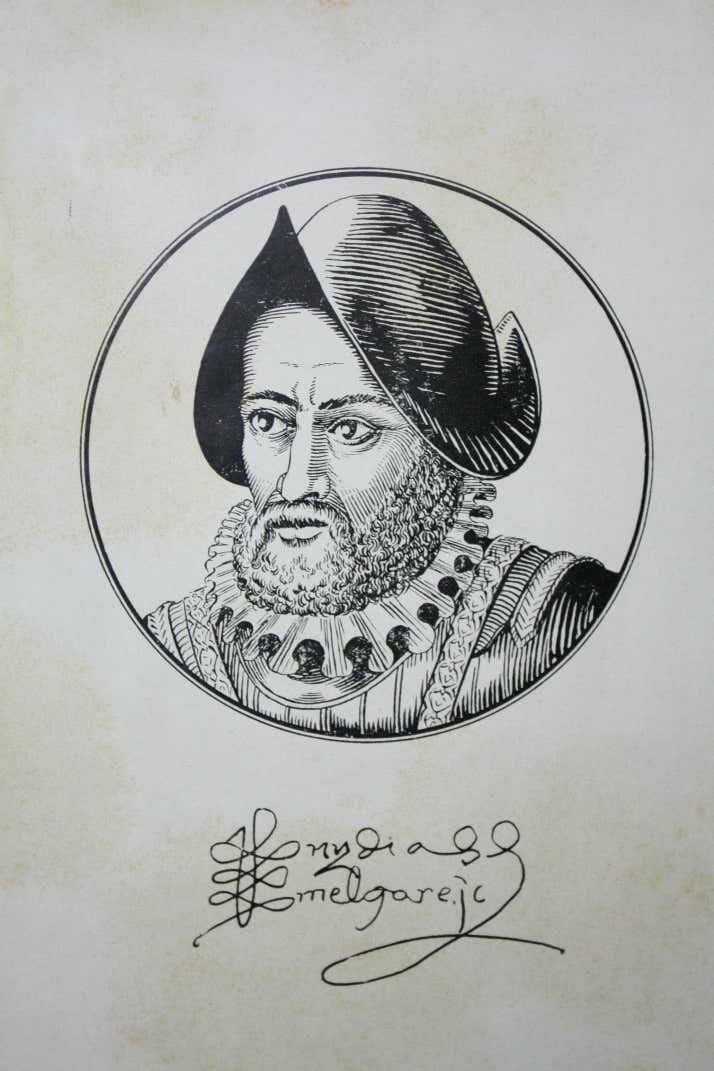
Illustration of Captain Melgarejo, the founder of Villarrica.

The Treaty of Tordesillas signed by Castile and Portugal set ambiguous borders between the two empires in South America. Portugal took an aggressive and expansionist policy and usually disrespected the agreements of the treaty. Meanwhile, the Spanish in Asuncion decided to settle more towns to the east closer to the Portuguese border to reinforce their territorial claims.

In the 1550s, what is now Paraguay was a province of the Governorate of New Andalusia and was ruled by Captain Domingo Irala. Under the command of Irala, the city of Ontiveros was founded to continue the conquest of the lands to the east of Asuncion known as the lands of Guayrá. In 1557, Ruy Diaz Melgarejo founded another city in Guayrá named Ciudad Real with the purpose of reducing the abuse that the Portuguese were inflicting on the Cario Indigenous tribe but also due to the strategic location as a trail towards Brazil. A couple of years later, the interim Governor Felipe de Cáceres has a personal dispute with Melgarejo and drove him out of the office of governor of the province of Guayra. Cáceres appointed an Andalusian conquistador named Alonso Riquelme to replace Melgarejo. When Riquelme arrived in Ciudad Real, Melgarejo had him arrested, incarcerated and later banished to a cabin forty leagues away from the town.

=== Settlement ===
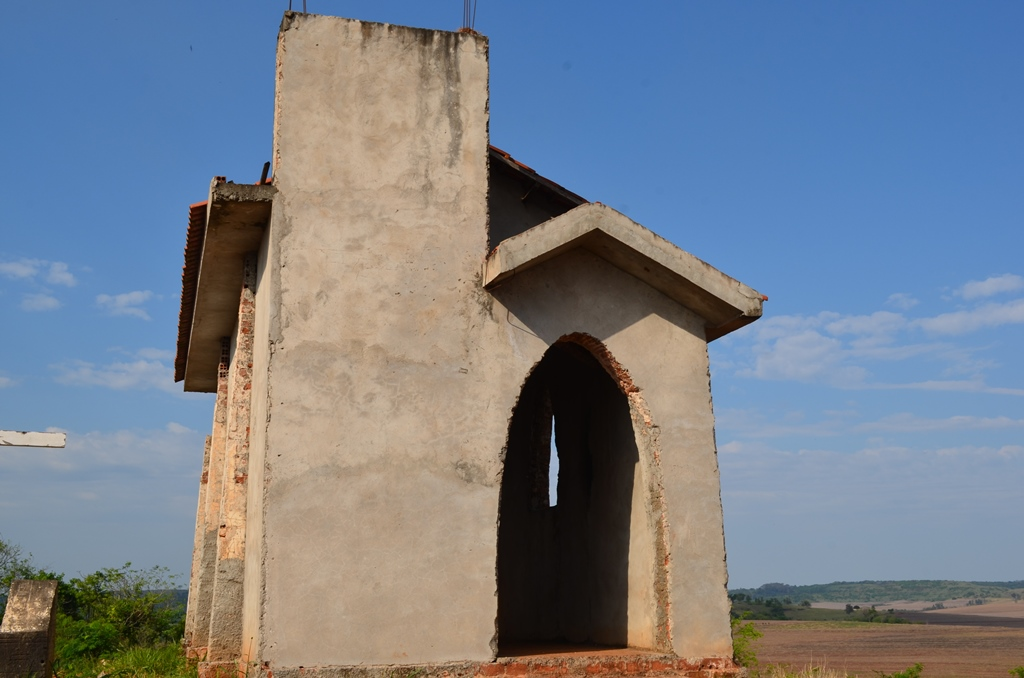
Small chapel at the original settlement of Villarrica. Currently a state park in the town of Fenix, Brazil.

In the 16th century, Melgarejo departed from Ciudad Real with 40 men and 53 horses towards the East where he expected to find mines of gold and silver. After arriving in the lands of an Indian chief named Cuaracybera (Shining-Sun), he settled a new town on May 14, 1570, and named it Villa Rica del Espíritu Santo (Wealthy village of the Holy Ghost) because of the belief that there were precious metals in the area and because the date was near the Catholic festivity of the Holy Ghost.

In 1592, explorer Ruy Díaz de Guzman moved the city 100 km east. In 1599, he moved it again, this time near the Mboteitei River, 100 leagues from Asunción. After long years of peaceful existence, the city was invaded in 1632 by the bandeirantes, and after 4 years of pilgrimage the population settled near Mbaracayu hills. Two years later, Governor Valderrama determined to situate it in the fields of Yaru. In 1642, the population moved to Curuguaty. In 1678, the population settled close to the Tobatyry River, in a place called "Espinillo". The soil was not good for agriculture, so many people decided to do a recognition expedition of the area beyond the Tebicuarymi River.

On the other side of the river, they found fertile land and several streams near the Ybytyruzú hills, so they requested the Spanish Governor's authorization to move the city again. On May 25, 1682, the Governor issued the license to settle in Ybyturuzú to await the King's official approval. On May 14, 1701 King Philip V issues the Royal Order that approves the permanent settlement of the city in Ybyturuzú. This date became the ultimate date of foundation. The Franciscan missionaries helped the town's stabilization, founding the Guaraní Mission of Itapé. As a result, the city got the nickname of "Wandering City".

=== 1600s to 20th century ===
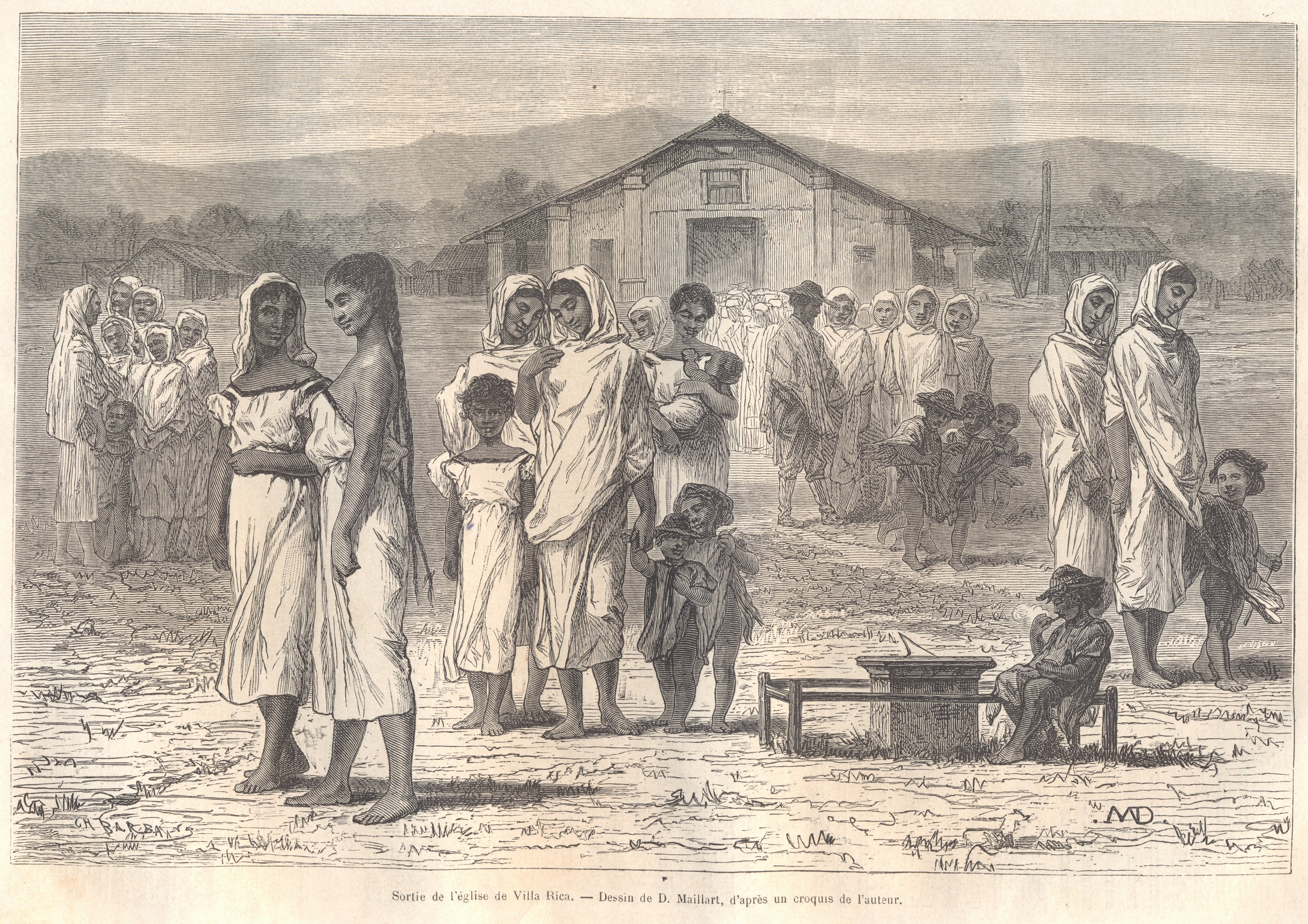
Women coming out of the Church of Villarrica (1872) French Illustration Le Paraguay

The Franciscan friars in an effort of educating the population and gaining souls to the Catholic faith ran a convent that worked as an elementary and secondary school from the 1600s until 1818 when Gaspar de Francia the dictator of Paraguay had it shut as part of his policy of retaining absolute control over the country. Schools were reopened in 1844 after Francia died only to be shut again in 1865 with the declaration of the Paraguayan War. When the war was over in 1870, Villarrica had a very small population due to the large casualties. In 1888, the railway got to Villarrica, starting rapid demographic and economic growth.

From 1892 to the beginning of the 1900s, the city received an important influx of Italians, French, Spaniards, Germans, Ashkenazi Jews, Argentines, Uruguayans and a lesser number of Lebanese, Croats and Greeks. These immigrants helped develop industry, culture and education, making Villarrica the second most important city after the capital, Asuncion. However, the two Paraguayan civil wars had a deep effect in the city, especially the so called Revolution of 1947 when the Paraguayan military took over and cause the migration of thousands of Paraguayans and an important part of Villarrica intellectual people spread across the country or made it to Argentina. A similar phenomenon occurred from 1954 to 1989 with the political persecutions during the regime of Alfredo Stroessner. By the end of the 20th century Villarrica had lost its prominent position within the country to newer settlements like Ciudad del Este, Encarnacion and Luque.

== Geography ==
The district of Villarrica is located 20 km to the west of Ybytyruzu hills, 172 km to the east of Asunción, 237 km to the north of Encarnación and 217 km to the west of Ciudad del Este. Within the department of Guairá, it is located in the central-western region at a height of about 200m above sea level. The municipal territory has roughly a shape of a triangle and has an area of 247 km^{2}.

=== Geology and Orography ===
The soil is composed of sandstones interbedded with shales and oolitic calcareous formations. In the alluvial plains of the Tebicuarymí River, there seems to be Quaternary sediments.

The soils of the urban area are mainly sandy hills, with gentle slopes in the northern area and slightly steeper slopes in the south. Good drainage and no rockiness are also observed. Both in the urban area of Villarrica and in 14 de Mayo area (on the way to Ñumí) ferruginous laterites can be found in the thick layers that support small topographic elevations. Due to the heavy deforestation, primitive tree species can be observed almost exclusively in areas of difficult access such as banks of streams. A great variety of grasses and palm trees grow In its terrain of undulating plains,.. Grass can be natural grasslands or cultivated in order to feed cattle. The current extension of the palm groves is small but is increasing due to soil degradation.

=== Hydrography ===
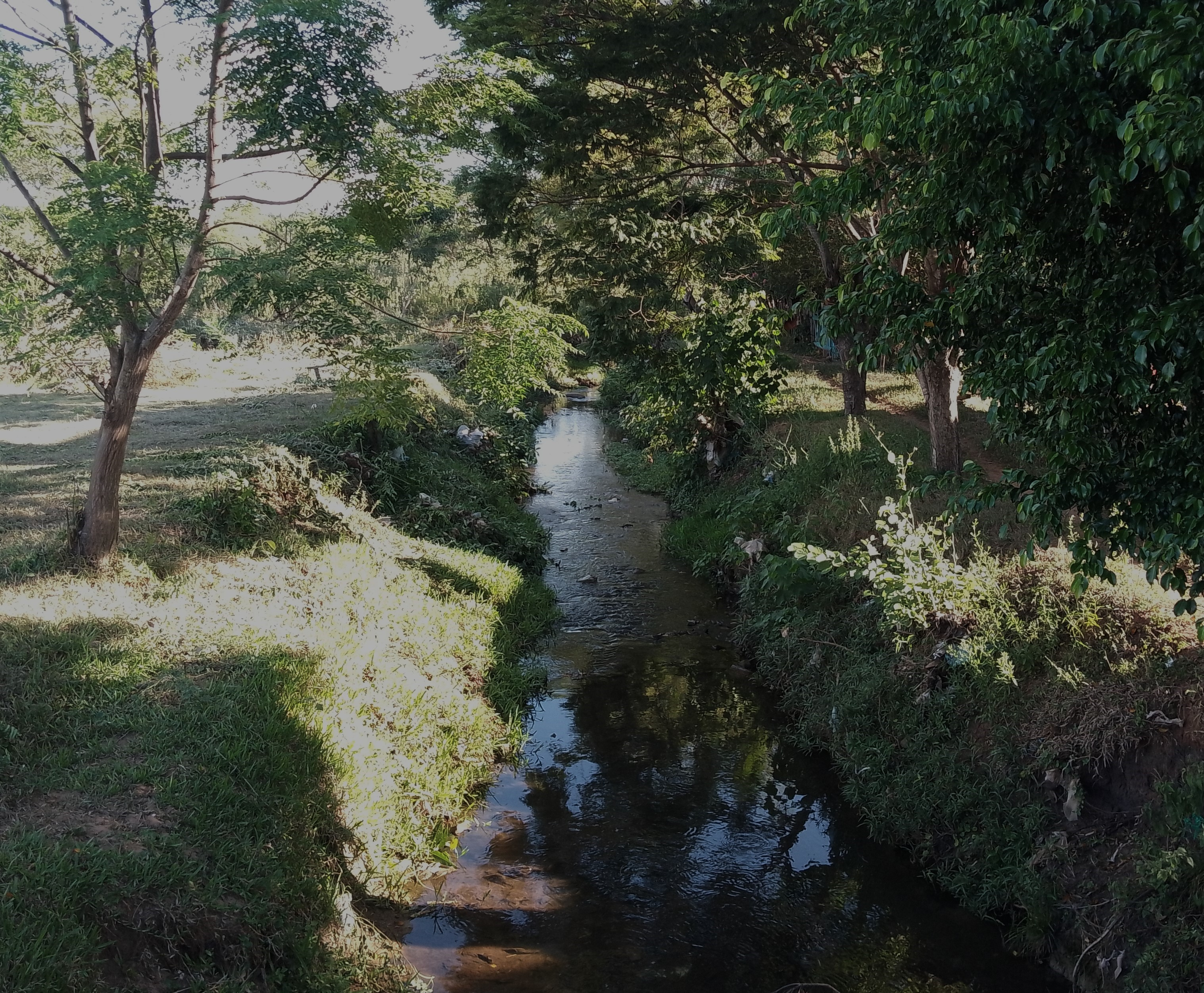
Carumbey stream in San Miguel neighborhood

Due to the particularly isolated location of Villarrica, no river reaches its municipal territory. Instead, the city is irrigated by a network of tributary streams of the river Tebicuarymi. The type of drainage is centrifugal and good internal drainage in the urban area. There are springs that drain to the south, to a stream named Guarapo and this one drains to the Bolas Cuá stream basin.

To the north there is a stream named Bobo that serves as the border with the town of Mbocayaty. Almost parallel to the Bobo stream, there is one of its tributaries called Mitay. Mitay stream which serves as the limit between Villarrica and Yataity. To the west there is a tributary of Mitay stream named Kaundy. Kaundy is the border between Villarrica and Félix Pérez. Both Kaundy and Bobo are tributaries of Mitay stream. Mitay feeds into Tebicuarymi river to the northwest.

Three streams in the urban area named Itacua, Carumbey and Ycuaangua feed into another stream named Yhu. Yhu is a tributary of Bolas Cua and its confluence is located in the hamlet of Caazapami to the southwest of the municipality. In the southeastern end of the municipal territory, in an area named 14 de Mayo, there is a stream named Remansito which is the limit between Villarrica and the town of Ñumí. The Remansito runs slightly to the southwest. The Ovie stream is located southeast of the municipality between the areas 14 de Mayo and Lemos and runs towards the southwest until it merges with the Remansito to form a new stream named Bolas Cua. The Bolas Cuá stream initially runs to the southwest where it serves as the border between Villarrica and San Salvador. However, when crossing the area named Yhacamí (San Salvador) it takes the northwest and once again borders the territory of Villarrica (Caazapamí) where it serves as the border between Villarrica and the town of Borja. Bolas Cua ultimately feeds into Tebicuarymi river.

=== Native Species ===
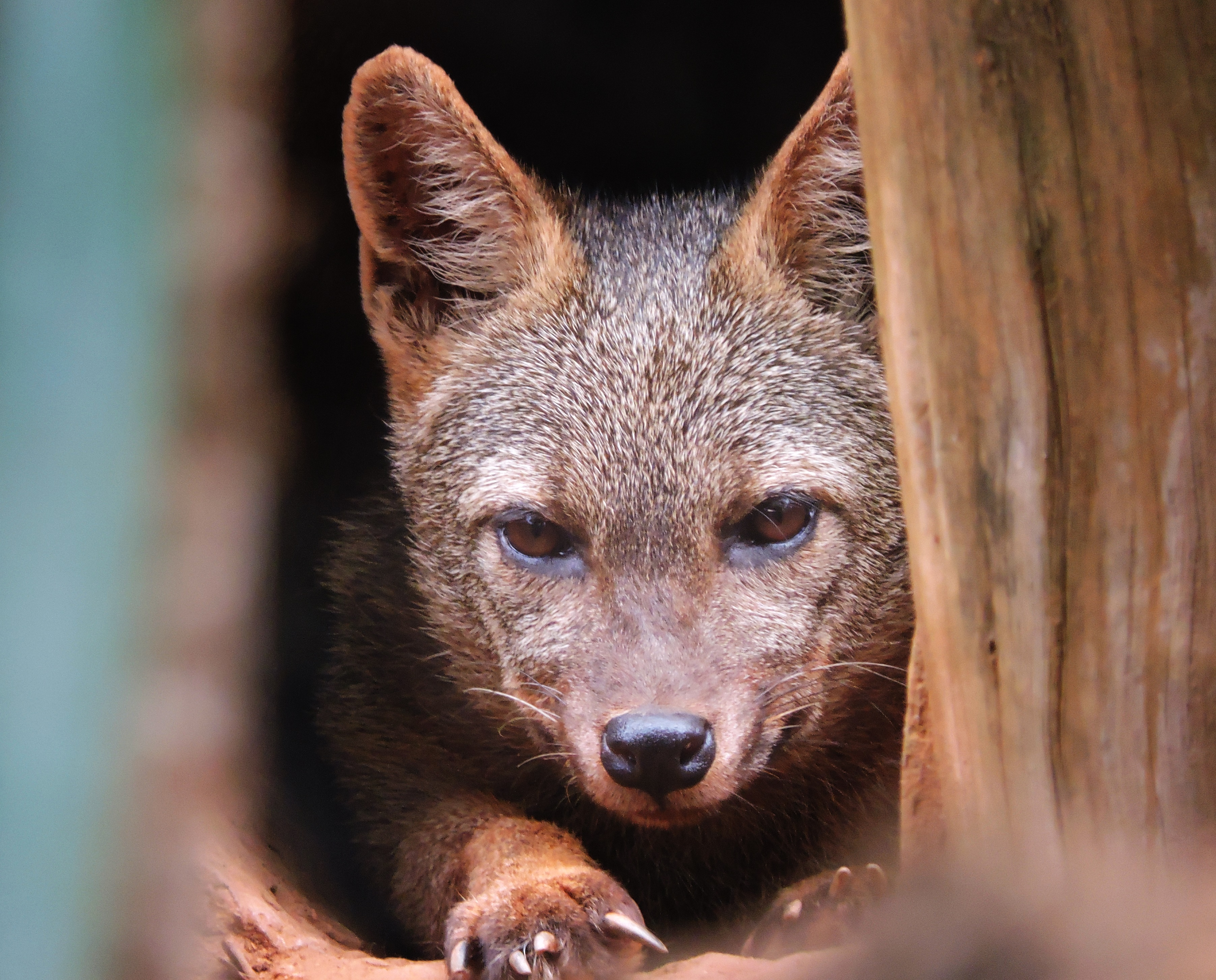
Cerdocyon thous can be spotted in the rural areas of Villarrica. Known by the locals by its guarani name Aguara´i

Native animals that can be observed within the territory of the city are the following:

- Birds: Pitangus sulphuratus, Cyanochorax chrysops, Procnias nudicollis, Nyctibius griseus, Campephilus melanoleucos, Mergus octosetaceus, Vanellus chilensis and Amazona vinacea.
- Reptiles: Hydrodynastes gigas, Eunectes notaeus and Dracaena paraguayensis.
- Mammals: Myrmecophaga tridactyla, Cerdocyon thous, Didelphis albiventris and Vampyressa pusilla.

The most vulnerable animal species are the giant otter and the mantle hawk. The apex-predator, the jaguar is currently extinct in Villarrica and western Guaira.

As for native trees one can frequently see Handroanthus impetiginosus (pink lapacho), Handroanthus serratifolius (yellow lapacho), Jacaranda mimosifolia (blue jacaranda), Peltophorum dubium (ibirapita), Cordia trichotoma and Enterolobium contortisiliquum (pacara earpod tree).

Some native fruits include the passion fruit (Passiflora edulis), acerola cherry (Malpighia emarginata), brazilian cherry (Eugenia uniflora), macaw palm fruit (Acrocomia aculeata), and a fruit called aratiku (Annona nutans).

=== Climate ===
Villarica has a humid subtropical climate (Köppen Cfa) bordering on a tropical rainforest climate (Af) and a tropical monsoon climate (Am). The climate, in general is benign and healthy, with an average temperature of 21 °C or 69.8 °F. In summer it can reach 38 °C or 100.4 °F, while in winter it can drop to 1 °C or 33.8 °F. The rainiest months are January and November.

Climate data for Villarrica (1991-2020, extremes 1961-present)
Month	Jan	Feb	Mar	Apr	May	Jun	Jul	Aug	Sep	Oct	Nov	Dec	Year
Record high °C (°F)	42.0 (107.6)	40.0 (104.0)	39.6 (103.3)	38.8 (101.8)	35.4 (95.7)	34.0 (93.2)	33.2 (91.8)	37.0 (98.6)	40.5 (104.9)	41.0 (105.8)	40.4 (104.7)	40.4 (104.7)	42.0 (107.6)
Mean daily maximum °C (°F)	33.1 (91.6)	32.3 (90.1)	31.3 (88.3)	28.8 (83.8)	24.7 (76.5)	23.6 (74.5)	23.5 (74.3)	25.9 (78.6)	27.2 (81.0)	29.3 (84.7)	30.5 (86.9)	32.2 (90.0)	28.5 (83.3)
Daily mean °C (°F)	26.7 (80.1)	25.9 (78.6)	24.9 (76.8)	22.4 (72.3)	18.8 (65.8)	17.7 (63.9)	17.0 (62.6)	18.9 (66.0)	20.5 (68.9)	23.1 (73.6)	24.2 (75.6)	26.1 (79.0)	22.2 (72.0)
Mean daily minimum °C (°F)	21.9 (71.4)	21.3 (70.3)	20.3 (68.5)	17.8 (64.0)	14.4 (57.9)	13.2 (55.8)	12.0 (53.6)	13.6 (56.5)	15.3 (59.5)	18.2 (64.8)	19.0 (66.2)	20.9 (69.6)	17.3 (63.1)
Record low °C (°F)	12.0 (53.6)	11.0 (51.8)	7.5 (45.5)	4.9 (40.8)	1.0 (33.8)	−1.6 (29.1)	−3.0 (26.6)	−3.4 (25.9)	1.1 (34.0)	4.4 (39.9)	5.6 (42.1)	7.6 (45.7)	−3.4 (25.9)
Average precipitation mm (inches)	155.0 (6.10)	143.5 (5.65)	143.7 (5.66)	159.6 (6.28)	181.0 (7.13)	100.5 (3.96)	79.0 (3.11)	63.2 (2.49)	109.6 (4.31)	206.0 (8.11)	190.1 (7.48)	175.7 (6.92)	1,706.8 (67.20)
Average precipitation days (≥ 0.1 mm)	10	9	9	9	8	8	7	9	9	10	9	10	107
Average relative humidity (%)	72	75	76	78	79	78	74	72	71	71	70	70	74
Mean monthly sunshine hours	234.0	239.4	236.6	204.2	165.4	192.6	185.6	233.8	198.8	219.7	246.8	260.7	2,627.3
Source 1: NOAA (precipitation days, humidity 1961-1990)
Source 2: Meteo Climat (sun, 1991-2020)

== Demographics ==
The influx of European immigrants the city received in the late 19th century constituted a significant part of the ethnic makeup of Villarrica until the second Paraguayan Civil War in 1947. After this conflict the number of European-descended people started to shrink rapidly due to emigration to Asuncion and Argentina, decreasing birth rates among the Europeans, increasing birth-rates of the locals, and mixed-unions with the already majority population with significant Indigenous and Sub-Saharian African ancestry. By the end of the 20th century, the racial makeup of Villarrica was virtually identical to the one of Paraguay, having over 90% of racially mixed residents who prefer to speak Jopara and Guarani over plain Spanish.

=== Subdivisions ===
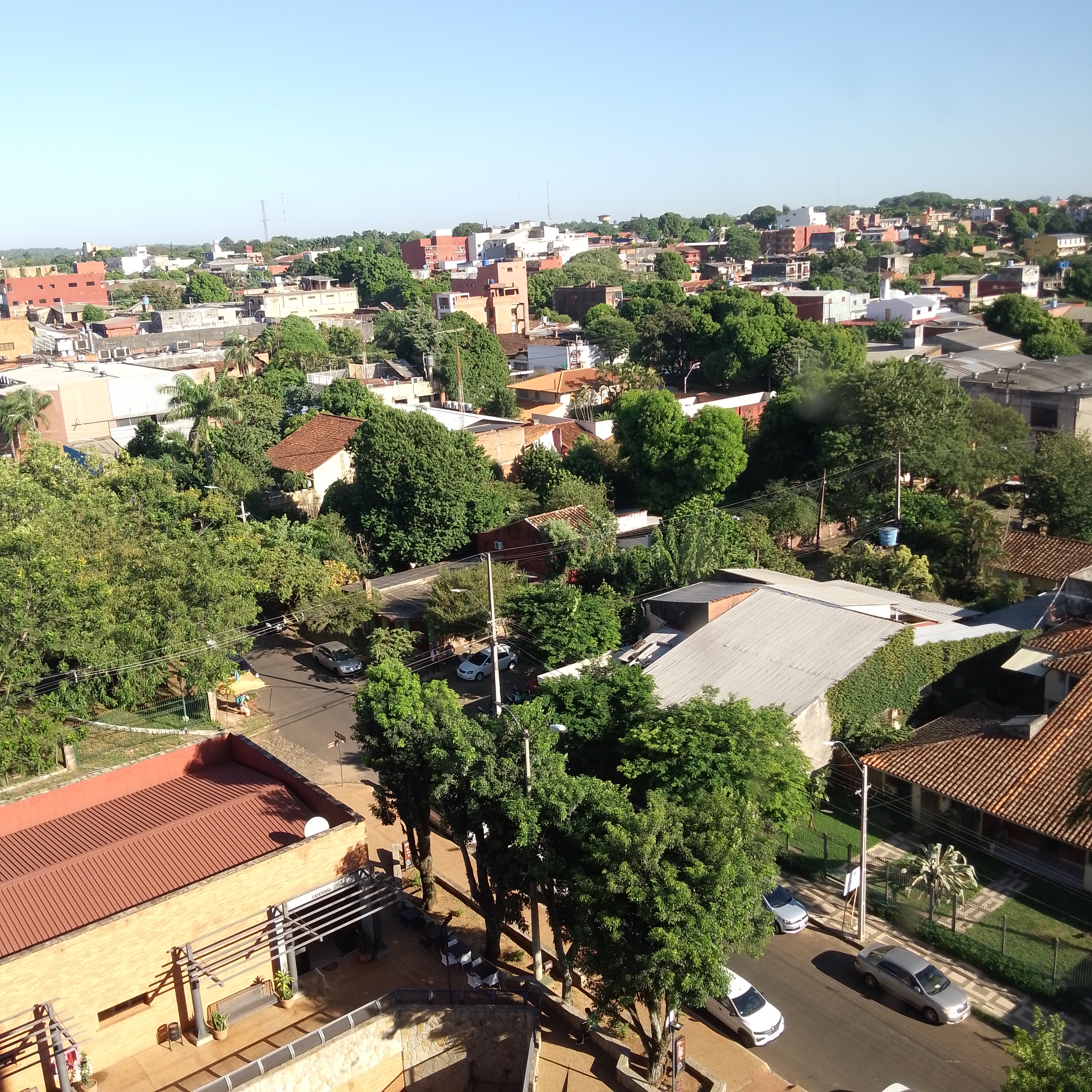
View of the Centro neighborhood.

There are 14 neighborhoods that comprise the urban area and 23 hamlets that comprise the rural area.

	Neighborhoods		Hamlets		Hamlets
1	Estacion	1	Rincon	15	Cañada San Juan
2	Santa Lucia	2	Pisadera	16	Ytororo
3	San Miguel	3	Doña Juana	17	Itaybu
4	San Blas	4	14 de Mayo	18	Punta Kupe
5	Santa Librada	5	Lemos	19	Caazapami
6	Lomas Valentinas	6	Mbopicua	20	Potrero San Francisco
7	Urbano	7	Rosado	21	Potrero Baez
8	Cristo Rey	8	Caroveni	22	Potrero Isla
9	Centro	9	Tuyuti	23	Loma San Francisco
10	Ybaroty	10	Costa Espinillo		
11	Yvyrarovi	11	Potrerito		
12	Salesiano	12	Cañadami		
13	Tuyutimi	13	Cañada Tape Kaaguy		
14	Curuzu Francisco	14	Santa Rosa		

== Economy ==
The most important economic activities of Villarrica are commerce of Brazilian and Argentine goods, services, and family-owned industries like sugar processing, furniture making, and shoemaking. Commerce has relevance to the economy of the city because the universities attract students from other towns in Guaira, Caaguazu, Caazapa, and Brazil. As for agriculture, it has a decreasing importance. Only 10% of the total sugar cane cultivation of Guaira comes from Villarrica.

== Infrastructure ==
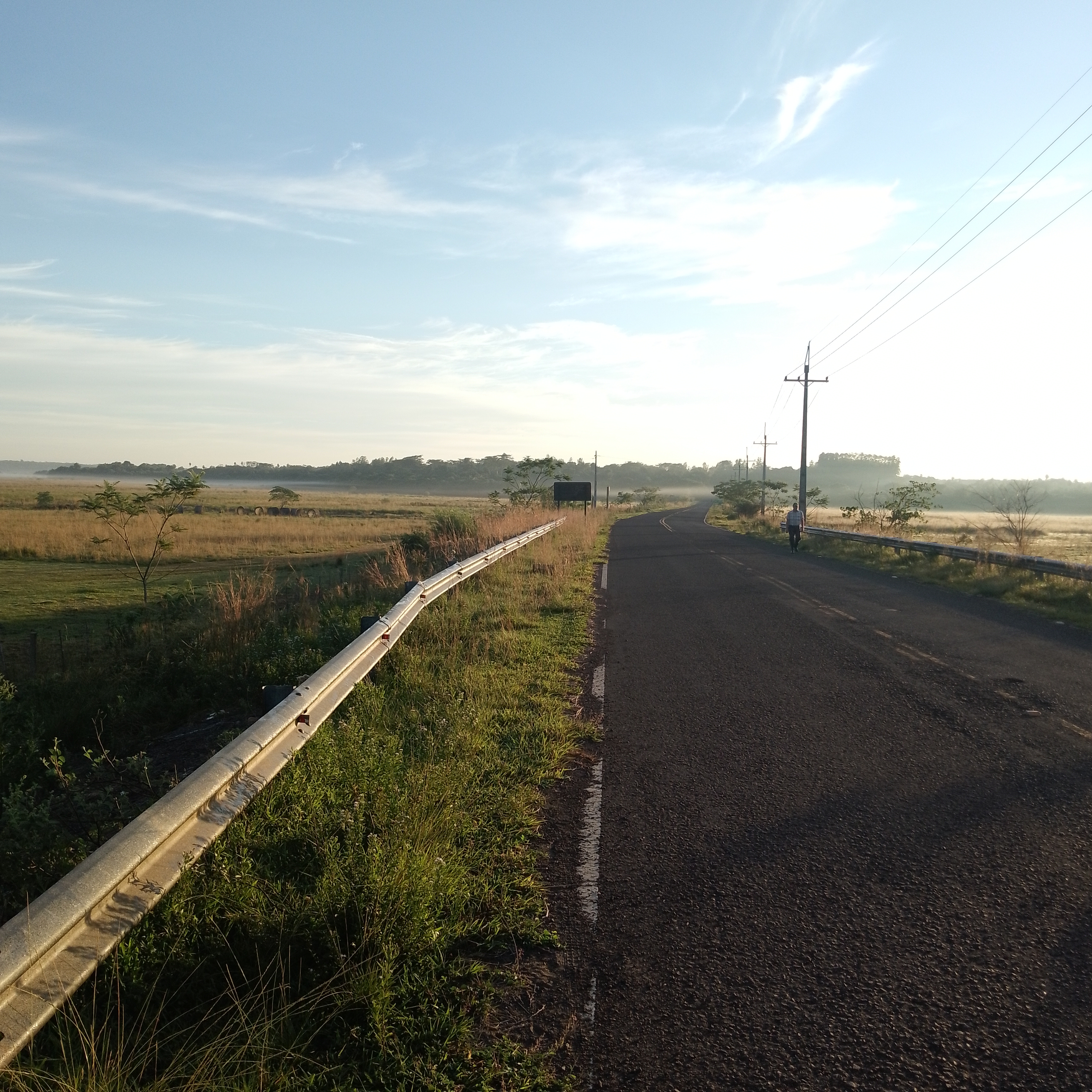
23km road from Villarrica to Itapé at Potrero Isla hamlet.

Villarrica is communicated to other towns in Paraguay mainly through Route No. 8 “Blas Garay”. To the North of Paraguay through Santani which starts at the junction of Route PY02 and Route PY07 and is paved until the district of Coronel Bogado in Itapúa Department. There is also another route that joins with Route PY07 that goes through the towns of Mbocayaty, Natalicio, and Troche. Moreover, Route PY10 communicates Villarrica with the city of Paraguari. There are two paved roads that communicate Villarrica with the town of Itapé. The first one(18 km) departs from Lomas Valentinas neighborhood and the other one (23 km) departs from Santa Librada neighborhood. The road that communicates Villarrica directly to neighboring town of Felix Perez is still a dirt road.

Water service is provided by the government owned company ESSAP. Electricity is provided by the local private company CLYFSA. Villarrica is the only municipality in Paraguay that gets its electricity service from a private company. The service for Internet access is provided by the companies Tigo, Personal and the state-owned COPACO.

Some banks that have offices in Villarrica are Itau Bank from Brazil, Banco Nacion from Argentina and BNF, GNB and Continental from Paraguay. Some cooperative institutions are COOPEDUC (founded in Villarrica), COOMECIPAR (nation-wide health personnel) and Cooperativa Universitaria.

== Education ==
The three main universities in Villarrica are UNA, UCV, and UNVES. UNA and UNVES are government-owned and UCV is private and run by the Catholic Church. The Medical School of the Catholic University in Villarrica is the second oldest in Paraguay after that of the UNA in Asuncion.

Among the prominent highschools in Villarrica there are Don Bosco and Maria Auxiliadora both run by the Salesian order of the Catholic Church; Centro Educativo Internacional run by non-denominational Christians; Buscio School which is private and secular and CRENT, government-owned and secular.

It has numerous educational institutions and schools, such as the National School, the Ortiz Guerreo School, Technical and Vocational National School, the Diosesano Seminar, the Agriculture Regional School, Women Professional Institute, and the Pío XII School of Arts and Crafts.

== Culture ==
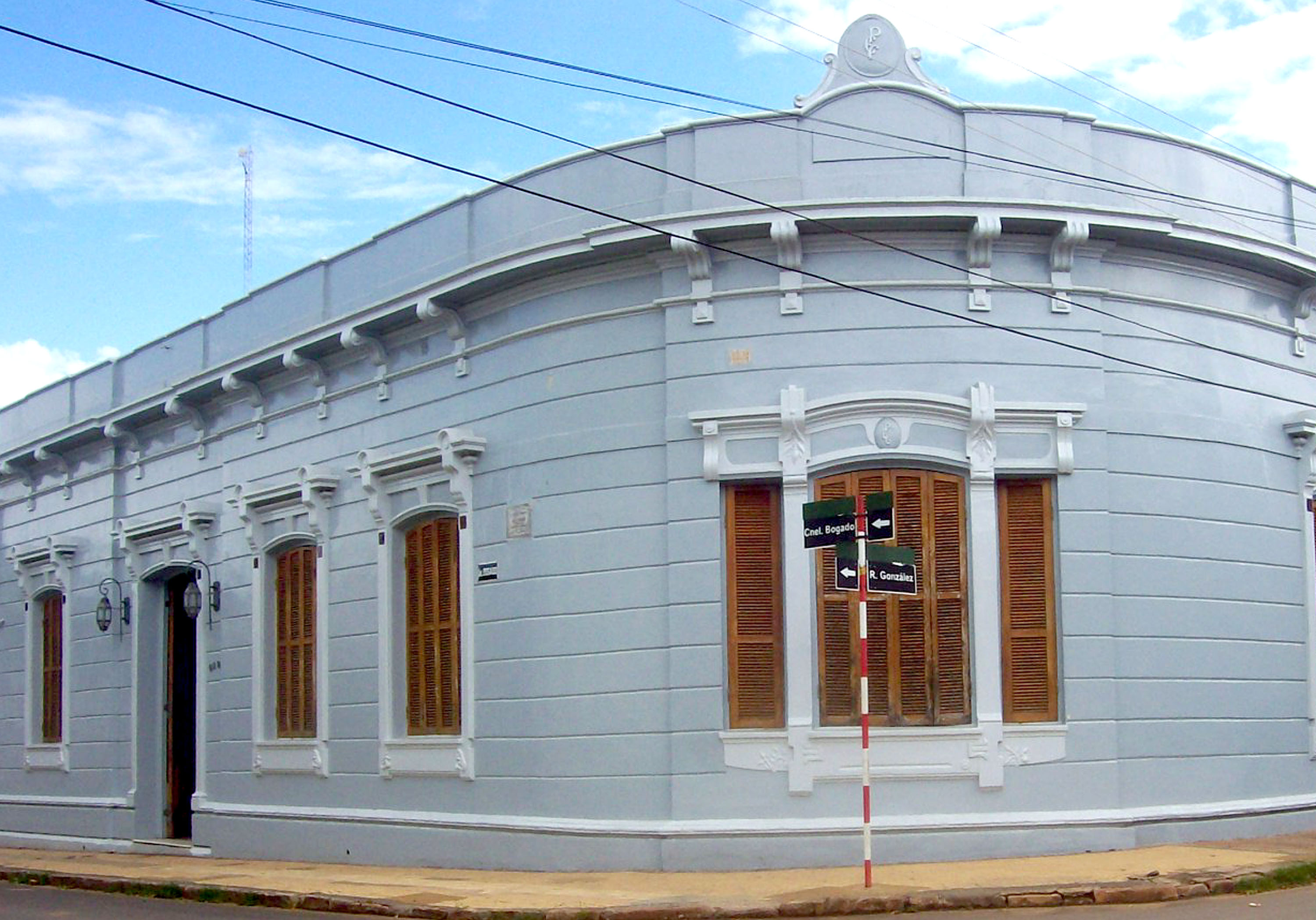
Club Porvenir Guaireño building in Villarrica

Villarrica was regarded as the second most important city in Paraguay due to its dynamic cultural activity until the first half of the 20th century. The first Paraguayan physician, the first Paraguayan poet and the first Paraguayan neurosurgeon all hailed from Villarrica. Many renowned Paraguayan artists such as poet Manuel Ortiz Guerrero, classical composer Diego Sanchez Haase and guitar player Cayo Sila Godoy were born and raised there. Several other Villarrica natives have been very relevant especially in education, journalism and literature. In addition, many towns in Paraguay such as Caaguazu, Mbocayaty, Independencia and even Union in San Pedro Department are said to have been settled by pioneers and families from Villarrica.

The oldest social club in Paraguay named Club Porvenir Guaireño was founded in Villarrica in 1888 and the first private electricity company named CLYFSA was also founded in the city in 1953. The second most popular political party in Paraguay, the PLRA was founded in Villarrica in 1886 by Villarrica-born Antonio Taboada.

Villarrica has its own soccer club named Guaireña F.C. and has competed in the First Division of Paraguayan Soccer Tournaments. Other popular sports in the city are rugby, basketball, cycling and tennis.

=== Music ===
In 1992, the Asociacion Filarmonica Guaireña gives classes of violin, viola, cello, bass, flute and musical theory. They have also formed the Ensamble Lumine Antiqua which is the only Paraguayan band out of Asuncion that plays barroque music. The Department of Culture of the Municipality has its own choir named Sensus Aeternus and they organize Choir Festivals with other choirs from neighboring towns and Argentina. Privately owned institutes give classes of guitar, piano, drums and Paraguayan harp.

=== Religion ===
Despite being overwhelmingly influenced by Catholicism, Villarrica presents increasing religious diversity. Villarrica is the seat of Iglesia Belen Pentecostal Libre del Paraguay. Other religious minorities present in the city include Baptists, Jehovah's Witnesses, and Latter-Day Saints.

Among the Catholic orders the most relevant are the Jesuits, the Franciscans, and the Salesians.

== Tourism ==
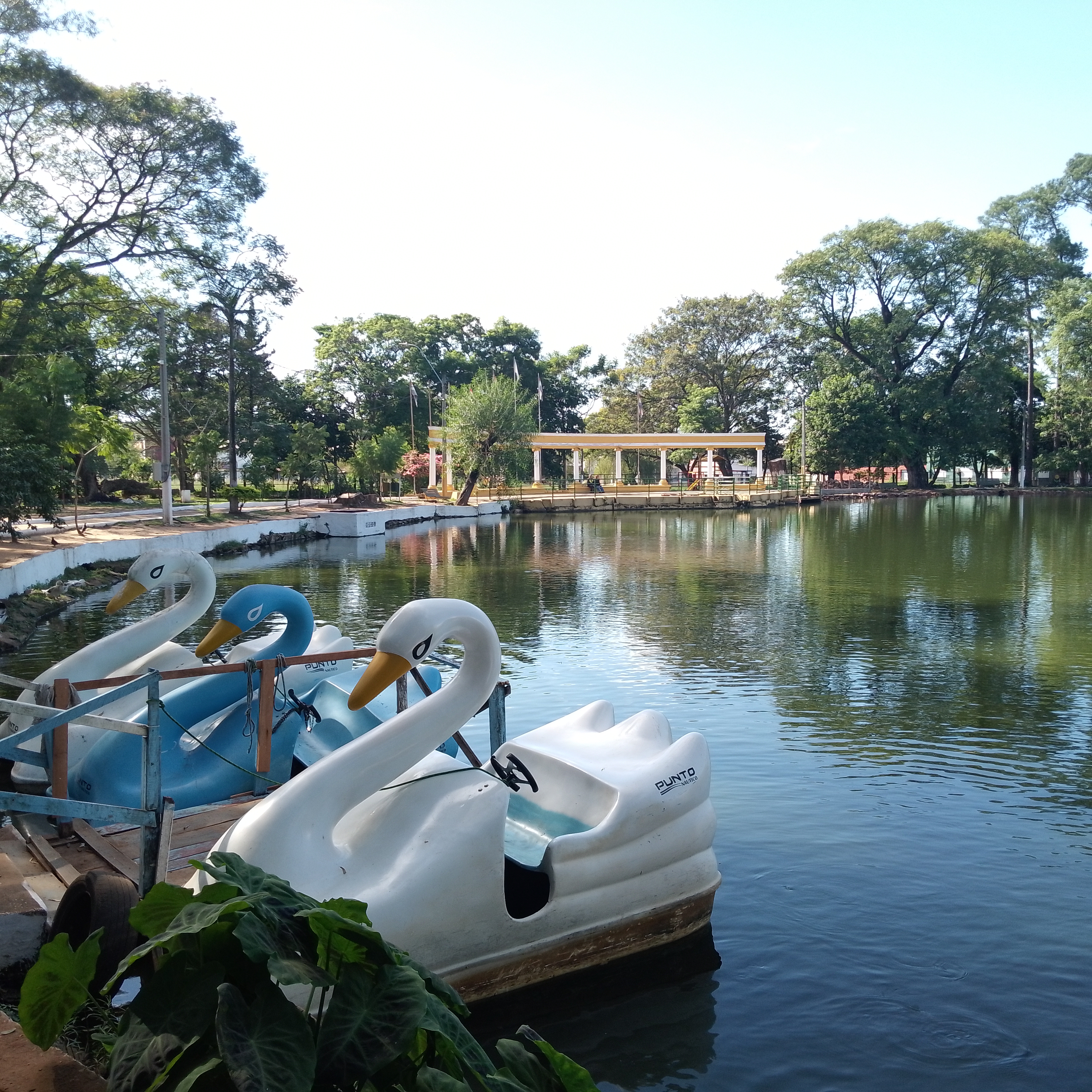
Ycua Pytá (guarani red lagoon) in Ortiz Guerrero Park

One of the most visited places in Villarrica is Ortiz Guerrero Park. The park is located in the Centro neighborhood on Dr Bottrel and Coronel Oviedo streets. There is a walkway around the lagoon and the tomb of the poet Manuel Ortiz Guerrero. Animals like capybaras, ducks, mallards, cormorants, geese, and an endangered species of rodent called agouti can be observed and fed in the park.

Another interesting spot is Fermin Lopez Museum which is set on a house built in 1842. It keeps personal belongings of Paraguayan War heroes like Fermín López and poet Natalicio Talavera; arms and ammunitions from the Chaco War, a collection of old Paraguayan coins and bills, as well as other artifacts such as indigenous weapons, old furniture, old photographs of the city and pieces of religious art.

Other suggested activities are to attend St. John´s Eve celebration in June at the Old Railway Station, to go for a walk or cycling at Guaira Park, attend concerts at the Cathedral, or hike at the hills in Ytororó hamlet.

== Gallery ==
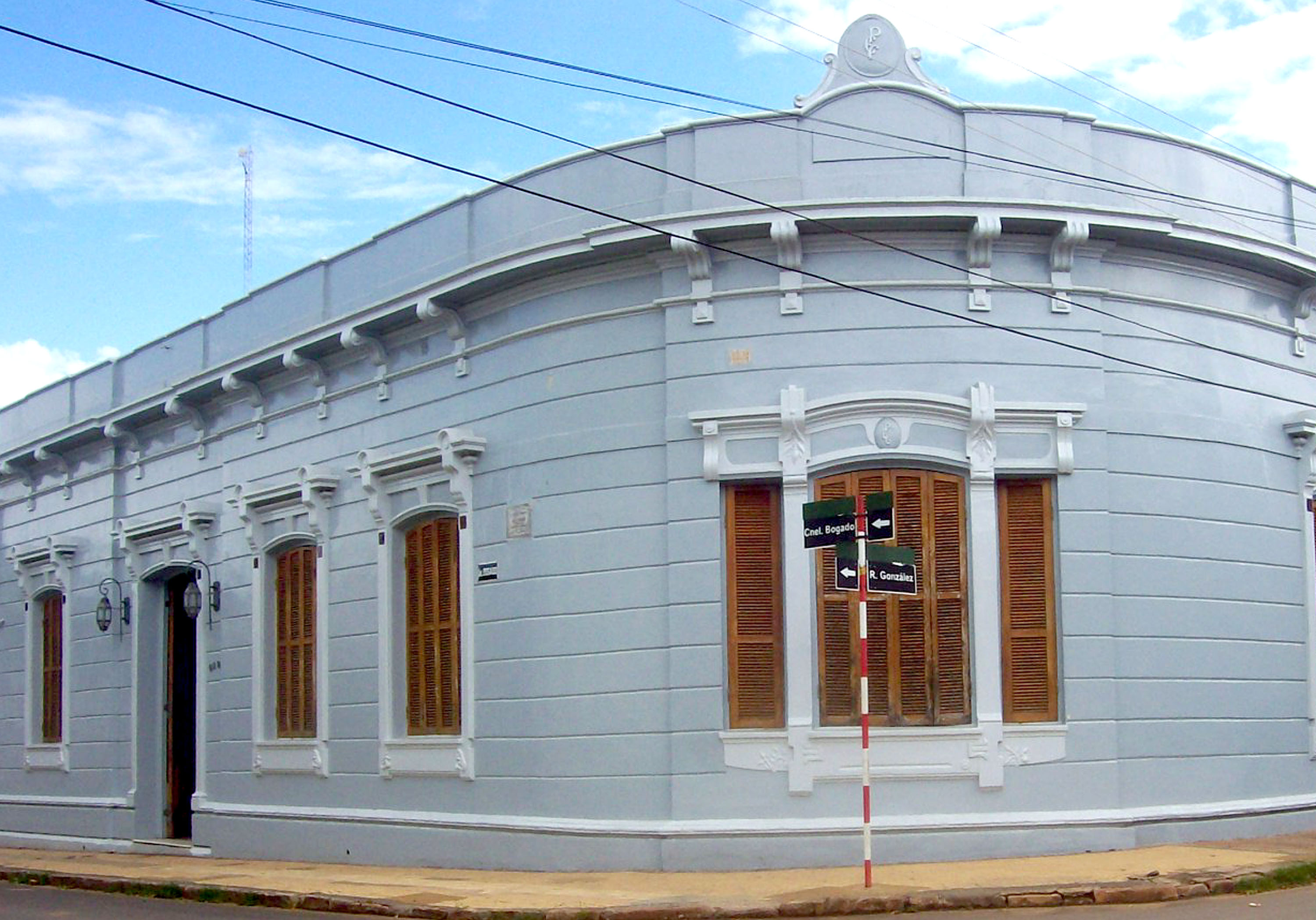
Club Porvenir Guaireño (1888)

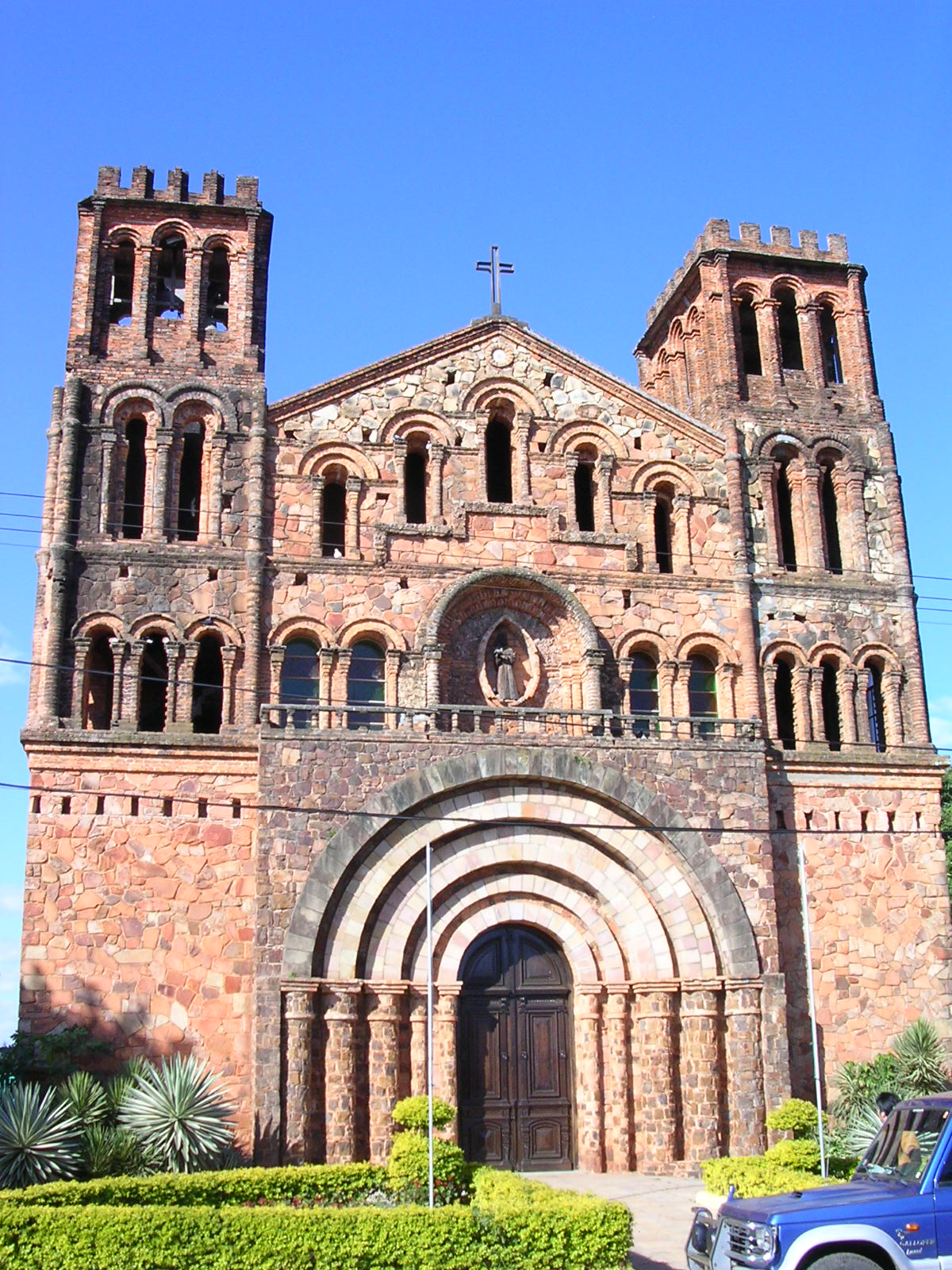
Franciscan Church in Ybaroty neighborhood

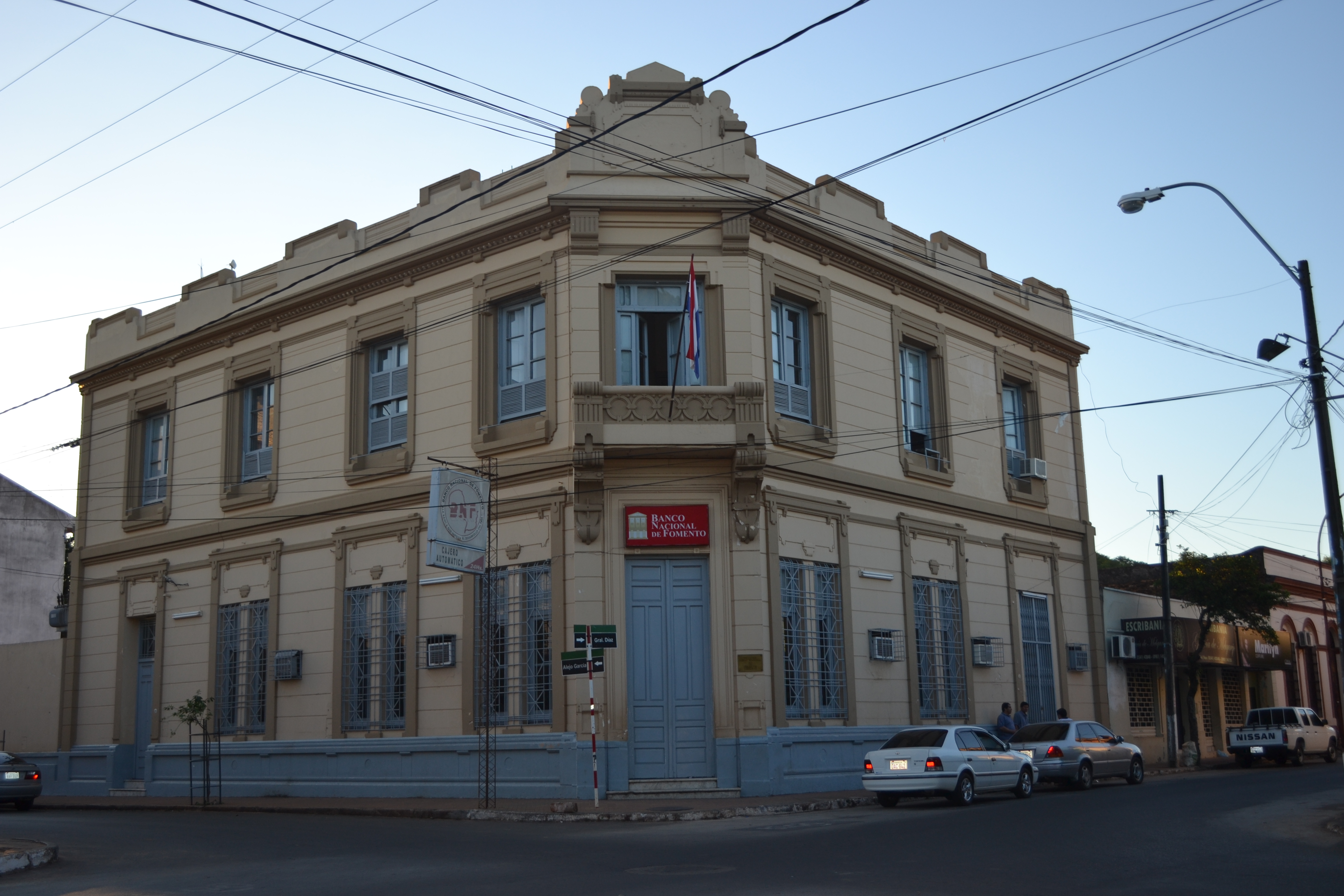
Building of the National Development Bank of Paraguay (BNF) in Villarrica

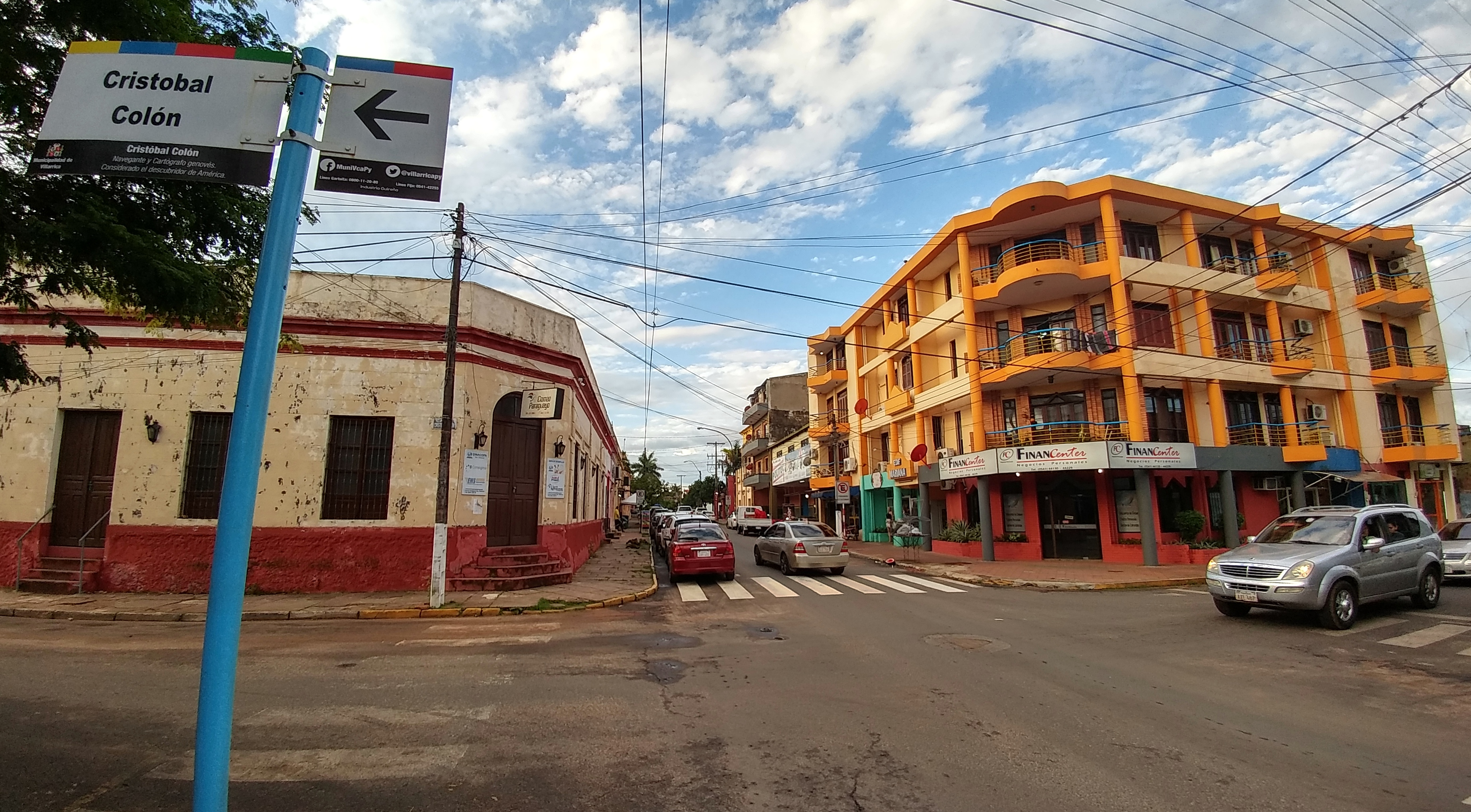
Post Office Building (left)

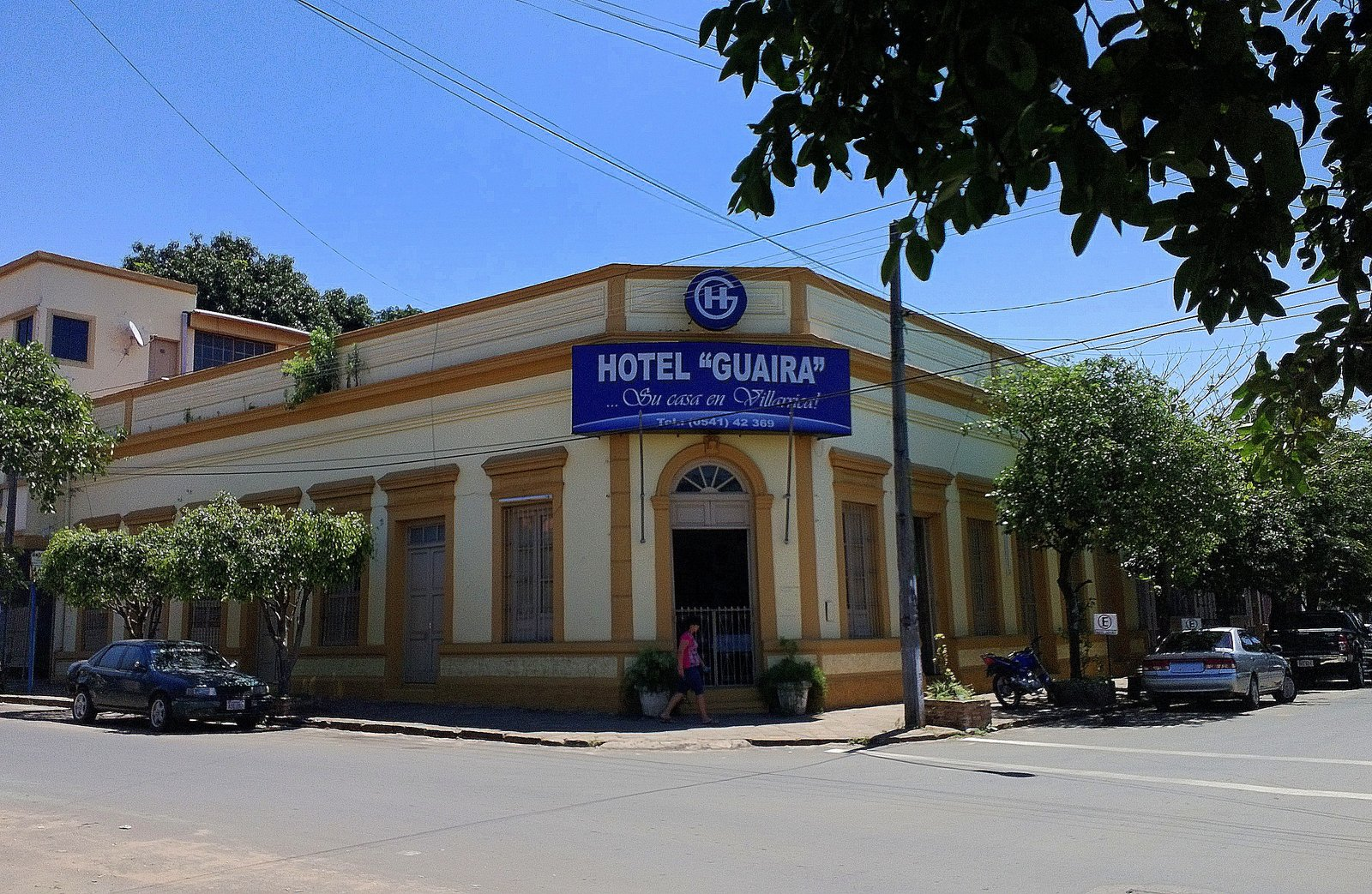
A small hotel in the town center

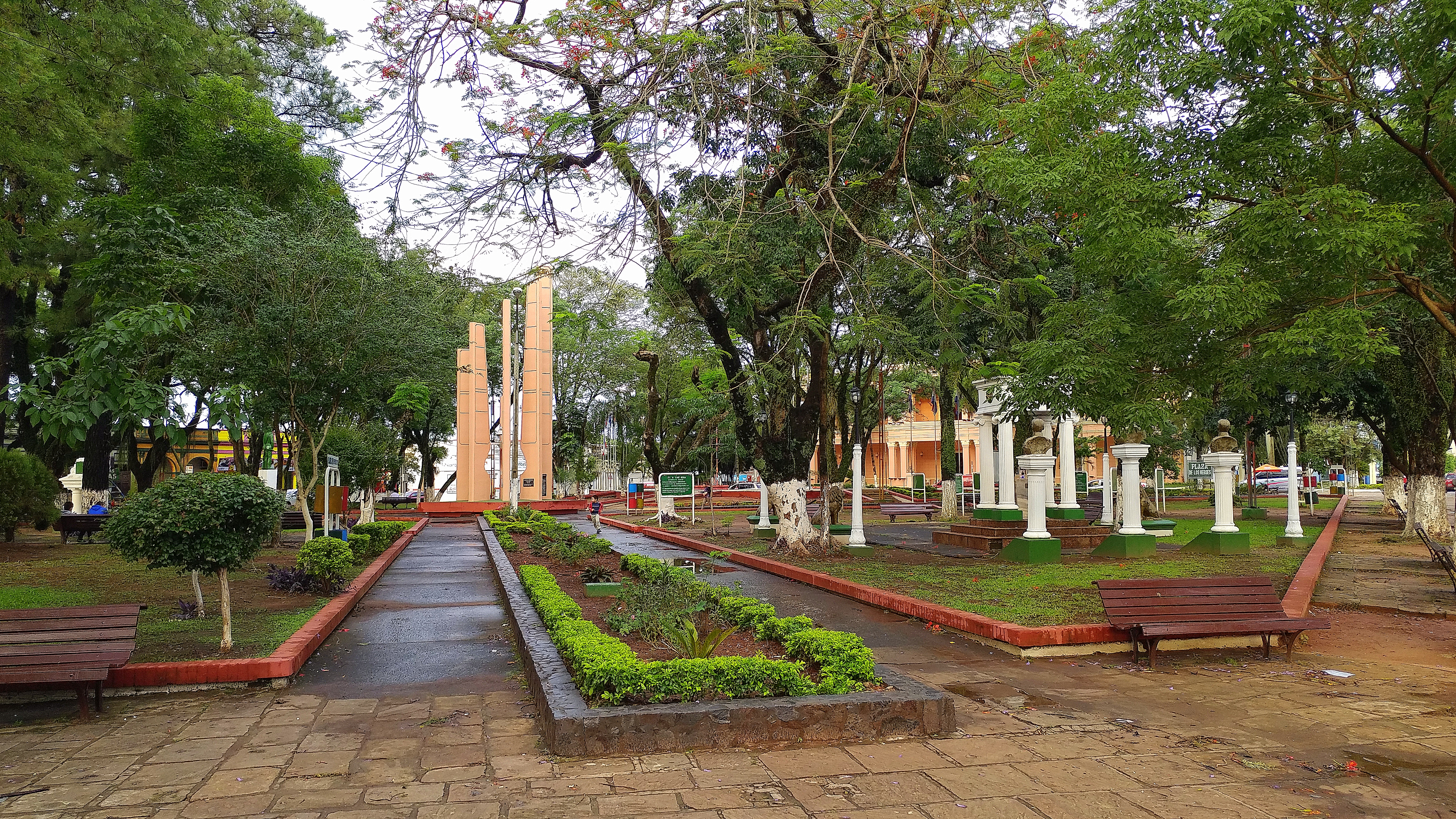
Heroes Square in the Centro neighborhood

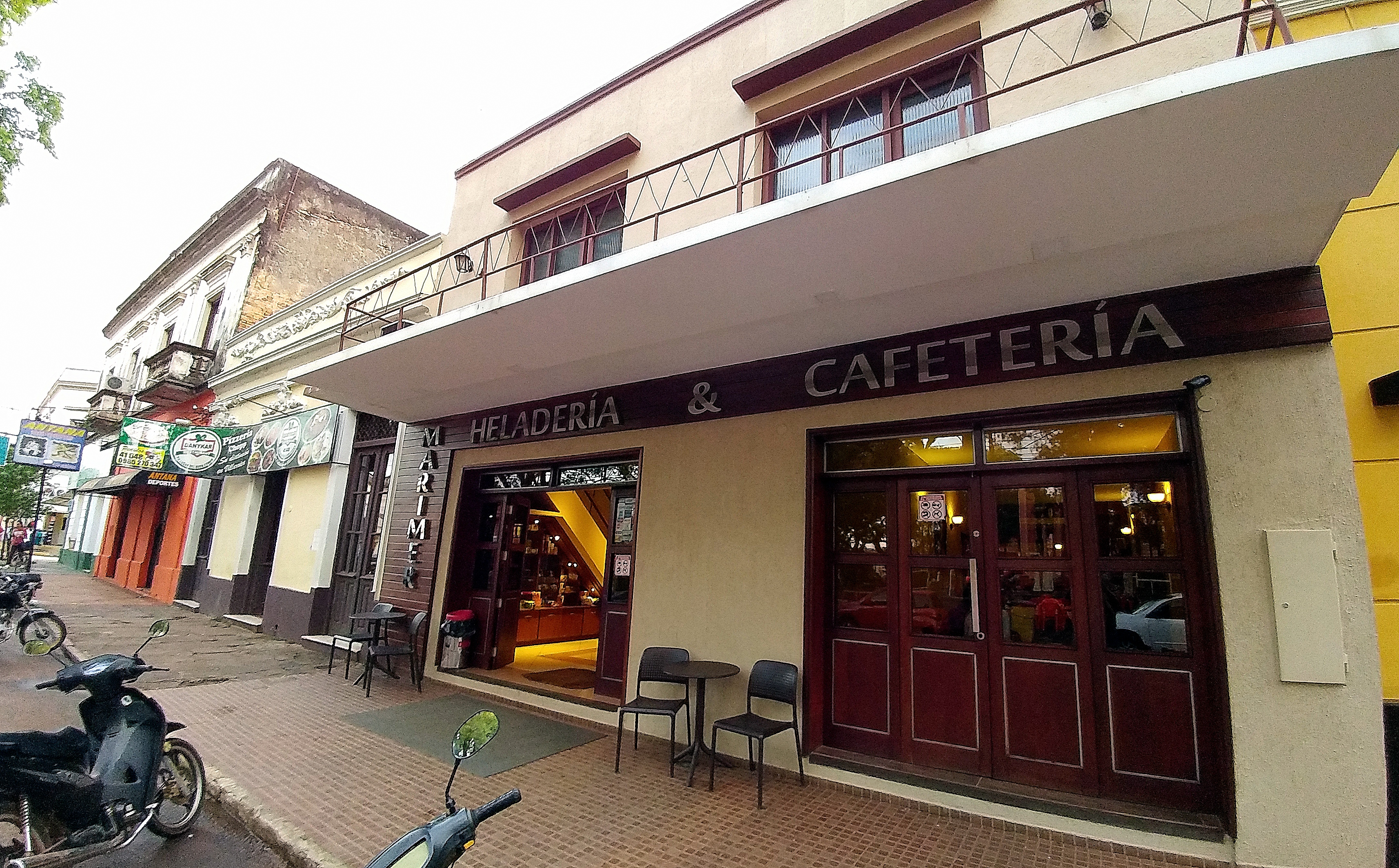
Downtown Villarrica, Paraguay

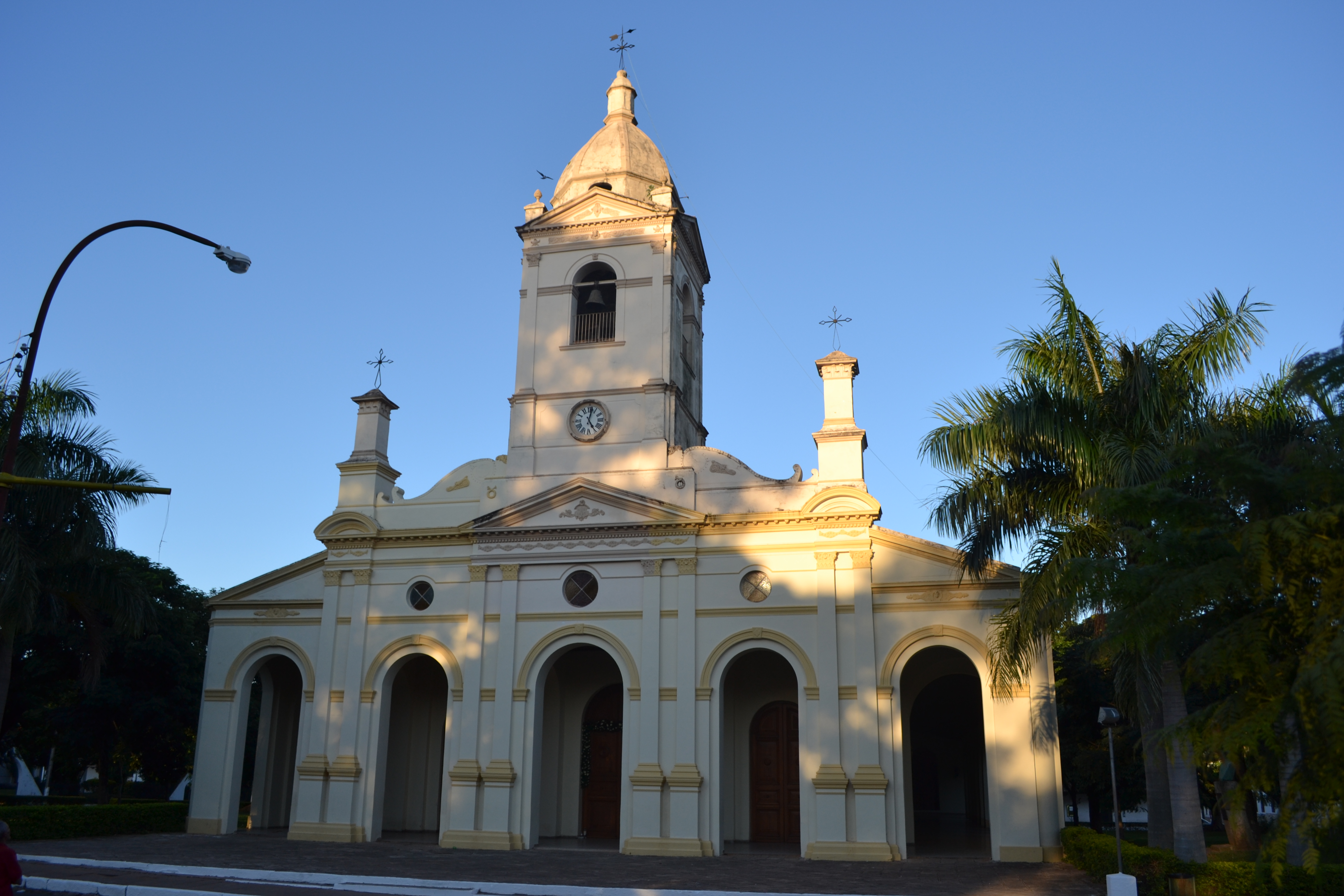
Saint Claire Cathedral

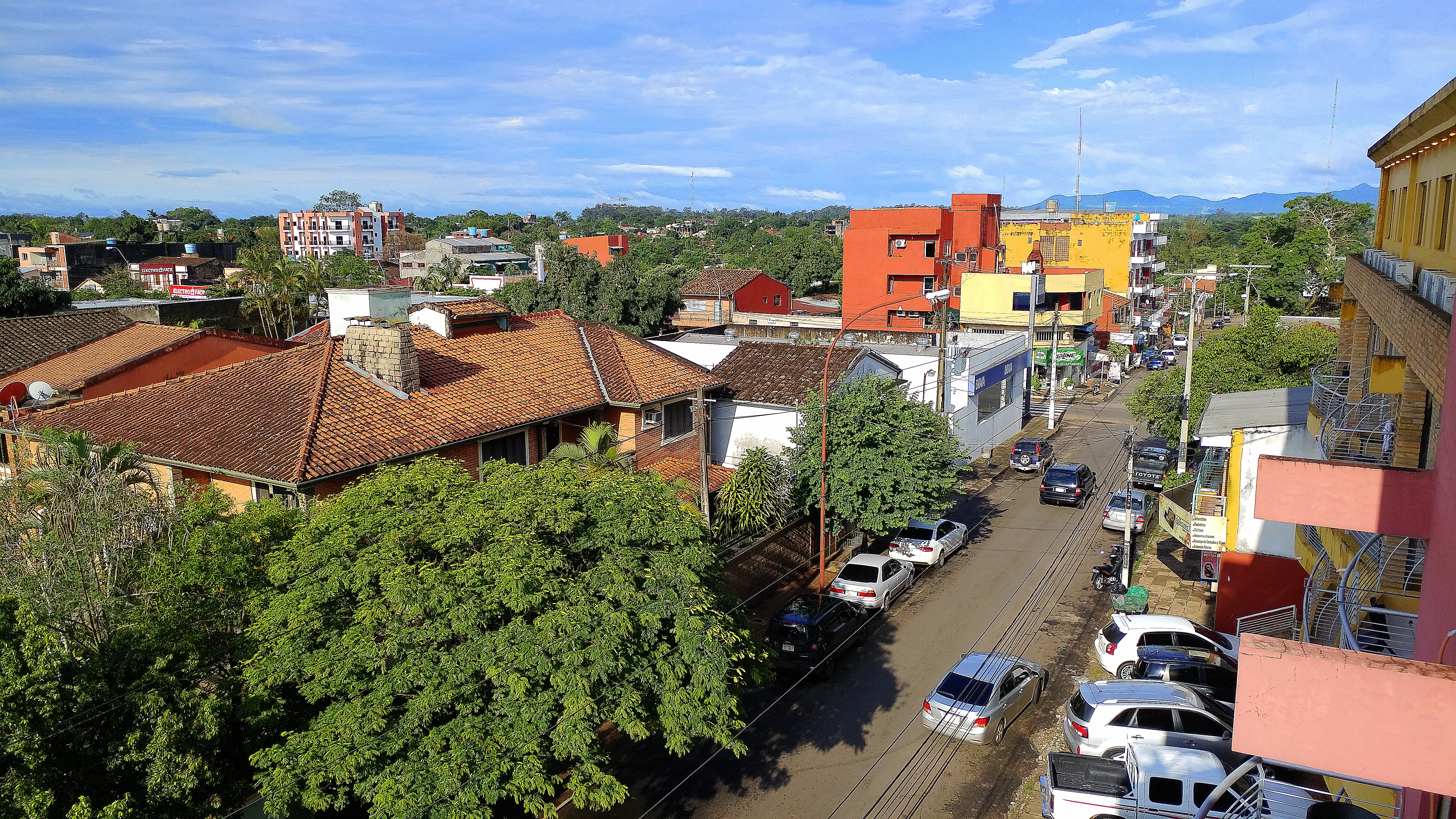
A view of Villarrica

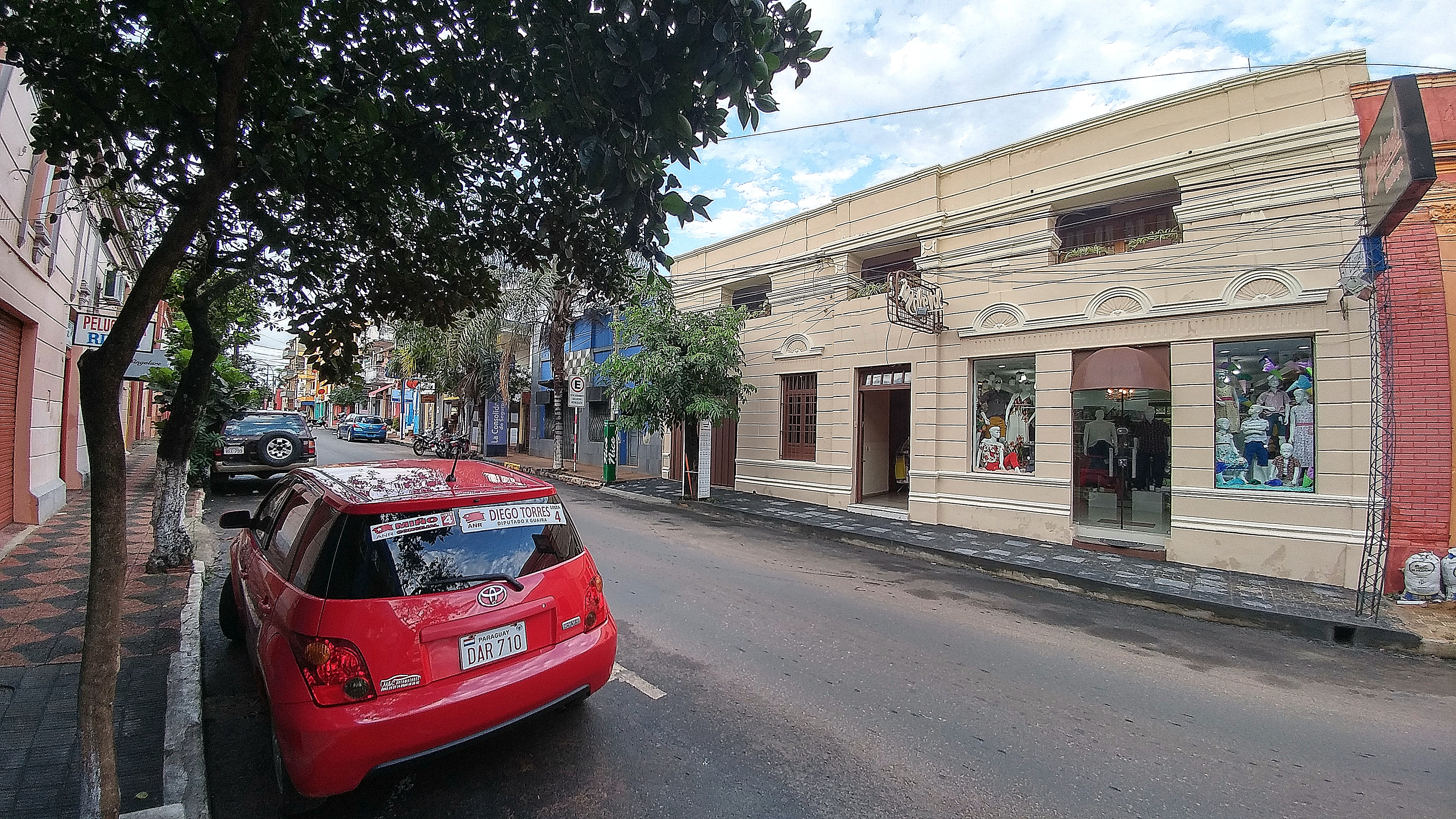
Random street downtown

== Notable people ==
- Manuel Ortiz Guerrero, poet and musician
- Natalicio Talavera, poet
- Natalicio González, 37th President of Paraguay (1948–1949)
- Efraím Cardozo, politician
- Helio Vera, writer, lawyer, and journalist
- Cayo Sila Godoy, classical guitarist and music educator
- Alfredo Seiferheld, historian, author, and journalist
- Marcos Zeida, communist politician
- Nadia Ferreira, model and beauty pageant titleholder; Miss Universe Paraguay 2021 and first runner-up at Miss Universe 2021
- Leah Ashmore, model and beauty pageant titleholder; Miss Universe Paraguay 2022

== Twin towns ==
Villarrica is twinned with:

- San Salvador de Jujuy, Argentina

== External sources ==
- Geografía Ilustrada del Paraguay. Tercera Edición. Distribuidora Quevedo de Ediciones. Buenos Aires.1998.
- Atlas y Geografía de Paraguay y el Mundo. Ediciones India Guapa. Asunción. 1997.
- Atlas Paraguay. Cartografía Didáctica. Fausto Cultural Ediciones. Enero 2000.
- Franco Preda, Artemio. El Guairá y su aporte a la cultura paraguaya. Editora Litocolor S.R.L. Villarrica, 2003.
