= Club Porvenir Guaireño =

Social club in Paraguay

El Porvenir Guaireño It is a social club Paraguay more than 100 years old. It has a Headquarters and another Campestre Headquarters, a significant list of founders and illustrious visitors who passed through the institution.

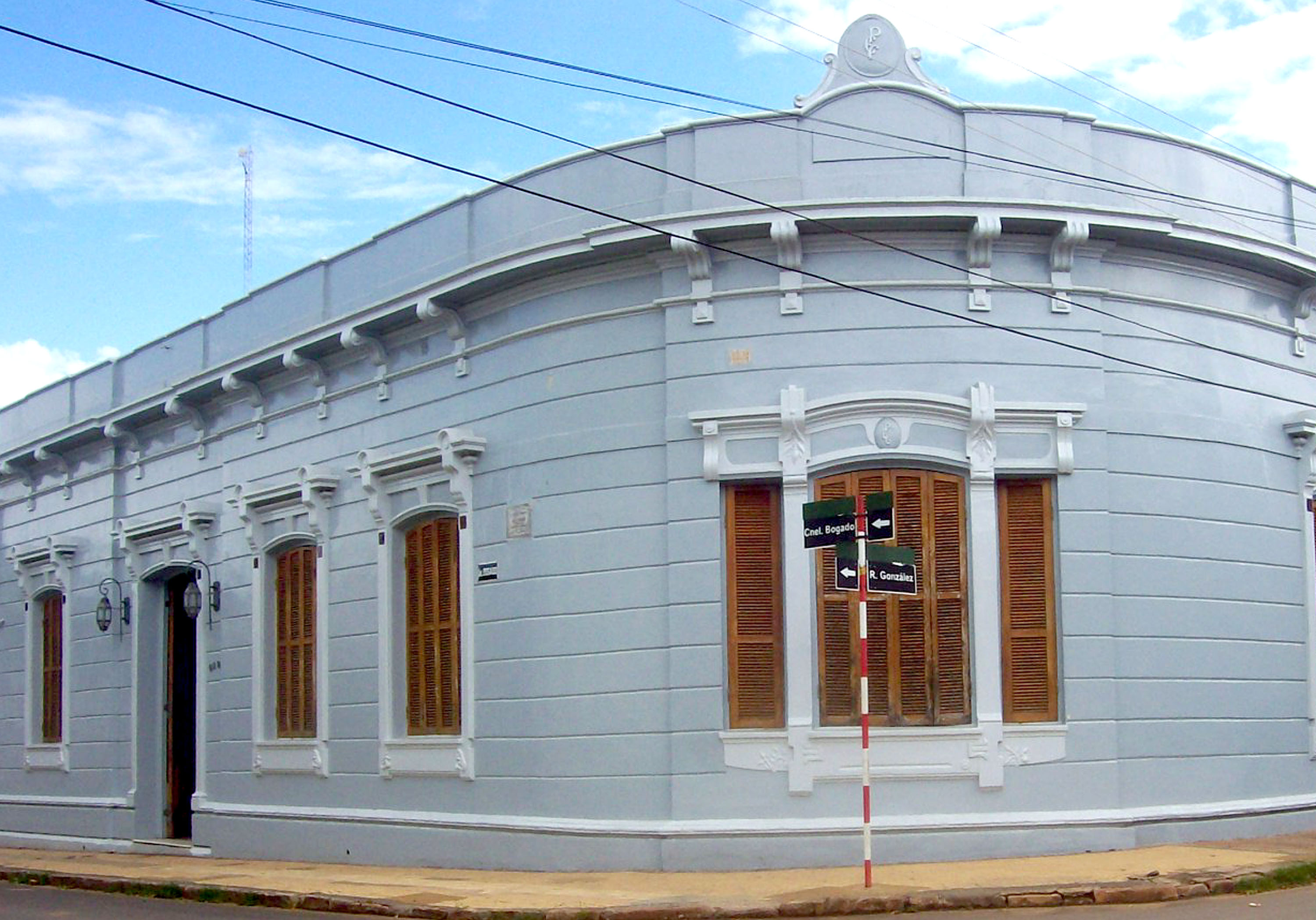
The Club.

== History ==
The Club "El Porvenir Guaireño" was born on December 25, 1888. The head office is located in the town of Villarrica in the Guairá Department on the streets Felix Bogado 918 San Roque Gonzalez corner. The property was acquired through purchase in the year 1915 the Gorostiaga family. The construction of the headquarters began in 1917, during the chairmanship of Mr Joseph B. Scarone and culminated in 1919. Of the planes and the construction of local engineer was charged Luis Zin and Mr Peter Guggiari was in charge of the Works and Finance Committee.

The institution has a by laws with 61 articles, which were amended in the General Assembly of November 28, 1915, while the Rules of Procedure was established in the year 1915.

== During the Chaco War ==
During the Chaco War (1932–1935), the club's facilities were used as a military hospital in blood. It responded to the injured and convalescent Guairá native who fought in that bloody war.

The club was visited by illustrious personalities of Paraguay, presidents of the era as Eusebio Ayala, José Félix Estigarribia, Félix Paiva and Juan B. Egusquiza, as well as international authorities as the political and military Argentine Juan Domingo Perón.

== Founders ==
The list of founders of the club appear Fernando Cohler, Jose Guggiari, Priest Maldonado, Marcelino Arias, Francisco Ortiz, Alejandro Bordón, Daniel Codas, Manuel V. Torales, John E. Spezzini, Francisco Martinez, Florencio Lopez, Romulo Decamilli, Antonio Papaluca, Patricio Echuari, Cosme Codas, Cyprian Gorostiaga, Antonio Pettirossi, Evaristo Fernandez, Marcelino Rodas, Augustine Guggiari, Eulogio Dominguez, Eustaquio R. de Aranda, Federico Codas, Vicente Ortiz, Segundo Bordón and Buenaventura Cabral.

Over the years the club was formed in a social institution-building and prestige. The elegance of its large halls was and still is the place for social events, cultural and artistic largest taking place in the Guairá community. In these halls are also carried out meetings in which educators Ramon I. Cardozo and Delfín Chamorro raised the problems and needs of popular education at that time.

== Campestre Headquarters ==
The Campestre headquarters is located in Mbocayaty, department of Guairá, Route VIII, 163 km. It has broad green gardens, playground, swimming pools, tennis court, etc.

== Executive Board ==
- President: Arq. Jorge Giret Figueredo.
- Vice-president: Sr. Rubén Fanego Mussi.
- Secretary: Esc. Marcos Ayala Talavera.
- Secretary: Esc. Rodrigo Rodríguez Marecos.
- Treasurer: Lic. Luis Zarza Benítez.
- Pro-Treasurer: Lic. José Bogado Fernández.
- Members: Sr. Guido Girala Velázquez.
- Lic. Guillermo Furler Fernández.
- Substitutes: Abg. Daniel Díez Barrios and Ing.Pedro Pablo Meaurio Melgarejo
- Trustee: Lic. Ramón Mieres.
- Substitute Trustee: Ing. Hernán Díaz Godoy.

== List of Former Presidents ==
- First president: Fernando Cöhler (1888 - 1889 - 1891 - 1894)
- Pbro. Miguel Maldonado (1890 - 1892 - 1893 - 1895)
- Cosme Codas (1890 - 1892 - 1895 - 1896)
- Esteban Gorostiaga (1893)
- Daniel González (1894)
- José Guaggiari (1897)
- No activity (1898)
- Patricio Echauri (1899–1904)
- Atanasio Riera (1899 - 1900 - 1901 - 1903 - 1904 - 1907)
- Manuel A. Gorostiaga (1902)
- Emilio Mastrazzi (1902)
- Delfín Chamorro (1903)
- Guillermo Harrison (1905 - 1906 - 1908 - 1911 - 1912)
- Tomás D. Peña (1909–1910)
- Claudio Gorostiaga (1913)
- José B. Scarone (1914 - 1915 - 1916 - 1917 - 1926 - 1927 - 1930 - 1934 - 1935)
- Luis Couchonnal Clermont (1918 - 1922 - 1923 - 1924 - 1925 - 1942 - 1943)
- Alejandro Marín (1919–1920)
- Francisco Solano González (1921–1929)
- Dr. Enrique Domínguez (1928)
- Dr. Pedro M. Martínez (1931–1941)
- Acefalía - Guerra del Chaco (1932–1933)
- Farm. Silvio Codas (1936)
- Luis A. Jara Casco (1937)
- Adalberto Friedmann (1938–1939)
- Dr. Vicente Chase Sosa (1940) - Silvio A. Alfaro (1944 - 1945 - 1946) - Eugenio Friedmann (1947)
- Juan B. Cresta C. (1948)
- Víctor Amadeo (1949)
- Evaristo Fernández Decamilli (1950, 1951, 1955, 1956, 1964, 1965)
- Dr. Luis Couchonnal Lagrave (1952, 1962, 1963, 1970, 1979, 1980) Presidencia 75 aniversario.
- Cristan Sohlberg (1954)
- Jorge Sisul (1953 - 1984 - 1985)
- Luis F. Bertolo (1957 - 1958 - 1971 - 1972)
- Dr. Antonio Heriberto Arbo G. (1959, 1960, 1961, 1967, 1968, 1969, 1986, 1987, 1988, 1989)
- Dr. Rodolfo Herrero (1966)
- Dr. Rubén A. Mussi Resk (1973 - 1974 - 1975)
- Aldo Juan Cresta (1981 - 1982 - 1983)
- Hugo Girala Acosta (1976 - 1977 - 1978)
- Gustavo Adolfo Bogado Bertolo (1990–1991)
- Walter Emilio Furler Garcete (1992–1993)
- Modesto Clemente Bogado Fernández (1994–1995)
- Miled Gustavo Girala Velázquez (1996)
- Dr. Justo Adolfo González Andino (1997–1998)
- Jorge Giret Figueredo (1999)
- Oscar Luis Zaputovich Girala (2000)
- Abog. Luis Manuel Benítez Bogado (2001)
- Dr. Emilio Furler Fernánez (2002)
- Hugo Guillermo Girala Velázquez (2003–2004)

== Debut ==
For several years, traditionally, many young women, daughters of members of the Club, made its debut in society in the elegant halls of the institution. The ceremony takes place every year, the institution was wearing gala, with the best music and fine arrangements for that date so special. The media, magazines and newspapers, echoed that unforgettable night through photographs that captured each of the moments lived by the beginners and their families.

== Carnival ==
The carnival is the most important event of the summer season of Guairá, where several clubs of the department look demonstrating their creativity and joy that characterizes the community. The club "The future guaireño" is also involved in this colorful festival, presenting every year major floats, choreography, luxurious costumes, beautiful ornaments on their shoulders, his queen, princesses and popular king momo.
