= Manuel Ortiz Guerrero =

Paraguayan poet (1894–1933)

Manú Guerrero
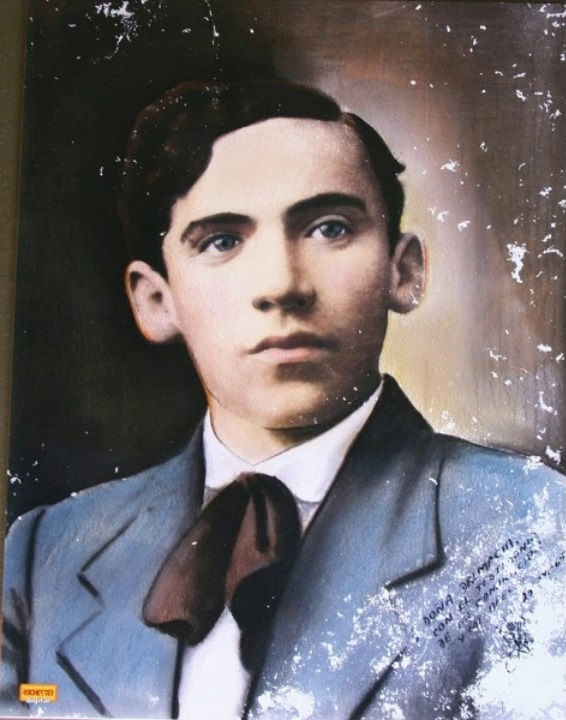

Background information
- Born: Manuel Ortiz Guerrero; 16 July 1894; Villarrica del Espíritu Santo, Paraguay
- Died: 8 May 1933 (aged 38) Asunción, Paraguay
- Occupation: Poet

Manuel Ortiz "Manú" Guerrero (16 July 1894 – 8 May 1933) was a Paraguayan poet and musician.

== Biography ==
Guerrero was born in Ybaroty, a neighbourhood in the city of Villarrica del Espíritu Santo, Paraguay. His parents were Vicente Ortiz and Susana Guerrero, who died after giving birth. He was raised by his grandmother, Florencia Ortiz. He completed his first studies in a school in Villarrica, and stood out for his interest in scholarly works. He was shy and not very social. While he was studying at the National College in Villarrica he wrote his first verses; during this time he acquired the "Manú" nickname. He arrived in Asunción in 1914, where he studied in the Colegio Nacional de la Capital.

He published his first poems in the Revista del Centro Estudiantil. Soon, local papers started to show interest in him. One of his most famous pieces, "Loca", was published in the magazine Letras. He lived with his friend and also poet Guillermo Molinas Rolón. In the 1920s he published poems such as "Surgente", "Pepitas" and "Nubes del este" and plays like "Eireté", "La Conquista" and "El crimen de Tintalila". He also wrote the lyrics in Guarani for some of his friend José Asunción Flores's songs. Pieces like "India" and "Buenos Aires" were written in Spanish.

Guerrero was exiled from his country and went to Brazil. He died in Buenos Aires, Argentina, in 1933, due to leprosy. His ashes rest in the city where he was born, and in a plaza of Asunción called "Manuel Ortiz Guerrero y José Asunción Flores". Posthumous publications of his works include Obras completas (1952) and Arenillas de mi tierra (1969).

== Work ==
A solidly modernist poem, "Loca" was followed by other poems such as "Raída poty", "Guarán-i", "La sortija", and "Diana de gloria".

In his book La poesía paraguaya – Historia de una incógnita, the Brazilian critic Walter Wey writes: "Ortiz Guerrero represented the great courage of being an intellectual in a country without editors, even that of living exclusively from art, since writing poems and playing the guitar were the only things he was good at".

== Sources ==
- Diccionario Biográfico "FORJADORES DEL PARAGUAY", Primera Edicción Enero de 2000. Distribuidora Quevedo de Ediciones. Buenos Aires, Argentina
