= Helio Vera =

Paraguayan writer

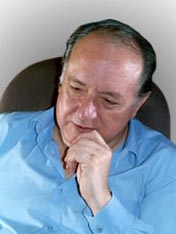
- Born: Helio Vera; 1946; Villarrica, Paraguay
- Died: March 25, 2008 (aged 61–62); Asunción, Paraguay
- Known for: Writer, lawyer, journalist
- Notable work: En busca del hueso perdido (Looking for the lost bone); Tratado de paraguayología (Treaty of Paraguayanology); Voces del Olimpo (Voices of the Olympus)

Helio Vera (1946 – 25 March 2008) was a Paraguayan writer, lawyer and journalist. He was a columnist for ABC Color, a daily newspaper in Asunción, and published many stories and novels in his entire career.

== His life ==
Helio Vera worked as a reporter in the first years of the ABC Color newspaper and, after working on other media, he began to work again for the newspaper as columnist and editorialist. His introduction to the literary world was in the 1980s with essays and comic stories about the Paraguayan culture. He was distinguished with many awards as the "El Lector" Prize to the best literary work in 1984 for "Angola y otros Cuentos" (Angola and other stories); the first place in the 5th Centenary Essay Contest in 1988 organized by the Ibero-American Cooperation Institute and the Embassy of Spain, for the Essay "Teoría y Práctica de la Paraguayología" (Theory and Practice of the Paraguayanology); and the first prize in the "Néstor Romero Valdovinos" Story Contest in 1992.

He was an active member of the Revolutionary Febrerista Party, full member of the International Socialist, even his grave had the flag of his party on top. His picture also is in the gallery of illustrate Februarists in the Martyrs of the Februarism Hall.

== Work ==
Year	Work
1984	Angola y otros cuentos (Angola and other stories)
1990	En busca del hueso perdido. (Looking for the lost bone)
1990	Tratado de paraguayología (Treaty of Paraguayanology)
1994	Diccionario Contrera (Opposite Dictionary)
1997	Antiplomo. Manual de lucha contra los pesados (Antiplumber. Manual of fighting against heavy people)
1998	Tradición y modernidad (Tradition and modernity)
2002	Carta Política de la República del Paraguay, de Lomborio I, el Breve (Political Letter of the Republic of Paraguay, from Lomborio I, the Short)
2002	Trofeos de la guerra y otros cuentos picarescos (War trophies and other roguish stories)
2005	Plagueos, ensayos y otros divagues (Complains, essays and other things)
2006	Voces del Olimpo I (Voices of the Olympus I)I
2007	Diccionario del paraguayo estreñido (Dictionary of the stuck Paraguayan)
2007	Voces del Olimpo II (Voices of the Olympus II)
2007	La hondita impaciente (The impatient honda)
2007	El Cangrejo Inmortal (The Inmortal Crab)

== Awards ==
- "El Lector" Prize to the best literary work in 1984, for Angola y otros Cuentos (Angola and other stories).
- First Prize. 5th Centenary Essay Contest in 1988, organized by the Ibero-American Cooperation Institute and the Embacy of Spain, for the essay Teoría y Práctica de la Paraguayología (Theory and Practice of the Paraguayanology).
- First Prize. "Néstor Romero Valdovinos" Story Contest in 1992, for the story Destinadas (Destined).
- Second Prize. International Story Contest in 1995, organized by the Pension Bank of Salamanca, Spain, for La Paciencia de Celestino Leiva (The Patience of Celestino Leiva).
- Special mention of the National Literature Award of Paraguay in 1999, for Antiplomo. Manual de Lucha contra los Pesados (Antiplumber. Manual of fighting against heavy people).
- Special mention of the National Literature Award of Paraguay in 2005, for La Paciencia de Celestino Leiva (The Patience of Celestino Leiva)
- Municipal Literature Prize in 2006, for the book La Paciencia de Celestino Leiva (The Patience of Celestino Leiva)

== Last days ==
He died on March 25, 2008, in the Santa Clara Clinic of Asunción where he was interned after being operated for a cerebral emboli that he suffered that month. His situation complicated because of an arritmia, the diabetes and arterial hypertension.
