= Alfredo Seiferheld =

Paraguayan writer, historian and journalist (1950–1988)

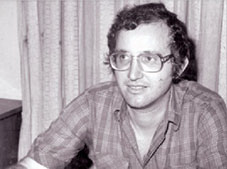
- Born: Alfredo Maximiliano Seiferheld Ruschinsky; July 26, 1950 Villarrica, Paraguay
- Died: June 3, 1988 (aged 37) Asunción, Paraguay
- Occupation: Writer, journalist, politician
- Spouse: Bibi Yurita

Alfredo Maximiliano Seiferheld Ruschinski (July 26, 1950 – June 3, 1988) was a Paraguayan writer, historian and journalist. He is recognized as the first Paraguayan author to investigate and publish on the influence of Nazism and Fascism in Paraguay.

== Early life and education ==
Seiferheld was born on July 26, 1950, in Villarrica, Guairá Department, Paraguay. He was the son of Ashkenazi Jewish refugees from Germany and Russia who had settled in the city years earlier. After completing his early education in his hometown and Asunción, he received his high school diploma in 1967, earning a gold medal for academic excellence. He continued his studies at the National University of Asunción (UNA), where he graduated with a bachelor's degree in history in 1971, again receiving a gold medal. In the early 1970s, he studied at the Sorbonne in Paris, France before returning to pursue postgraduate studies at the Faculty of Philosophy of the UNA. He was married to Bibi Yurita.

== Career ==
In 1986, Seiferheld earned his doctorate with the thesis Nazismo y fascismo en el Paraguay (Nazism and Fascism in Paraguay), an investigation into the influence of totalitarian ideologies within the country. As a historian, one of his most significant historiographical contributions was the 1981 publication of Los judíos en el Paraguay, a book reflecting on the history of Jewish colonization and presence in the nation. He also founded the publishing house Editorial Histórica.

Parallel to his academic work, Seiferheld had a career in journalism. He was an active contributor and columnist for the daily newspaper ABC Color, where he published numerous articles on historical and political topics. A selection of these articles was later compiled and published as Conversaciones político-militares. Additionally, he served as the Paraguayan correspondent for the Associated Press news agency and the American magazine Time.

Seiferheld was also a dedicated philatelist. He authored the books Correos y sellos paraguayos (1975) and Filatelia, afición sin barreras (1976), and served as the founder and first president of the Philatelic Association of Paraguay.

His final years were his most prolific in the cultural field. Seiferheld died after a long illness on June 3, 1988, at the age of 37.

== Works ==
- Correos y sellos Paraguayos (1975)
- Filatelia, afición sin barreras (1976)
- Economía y petróleo durante la Guerra del Chaco (1983)
- Nazismo y fascismo en el Paraguay (1986)
- Conversaciones Político-Militares (1988)

== Awards ==
- "Outstanding young man" by the Junior Chamber of Paraguay
- Member of the 12 del año (1982), distinction awarded by Radio Primero de Marzo 780 AM.

== Organizations ==
- Founder and first president of the 'Philatelic association of Paraguay'.
- Member of the Institute of International Relations Studies and geopolitics.
- Member of the Inter-American philatelic writers.
- Member of the Academy of Paraguayan history.
- Postal History Society of New York.

== Sources ==
- Alfredo Seiferheld: A man of commitment and responsibility ". Jorge Rubbiani. Weekly Mail. Ultima Hora, June 7, 2008
