= Delfín Chamorro =

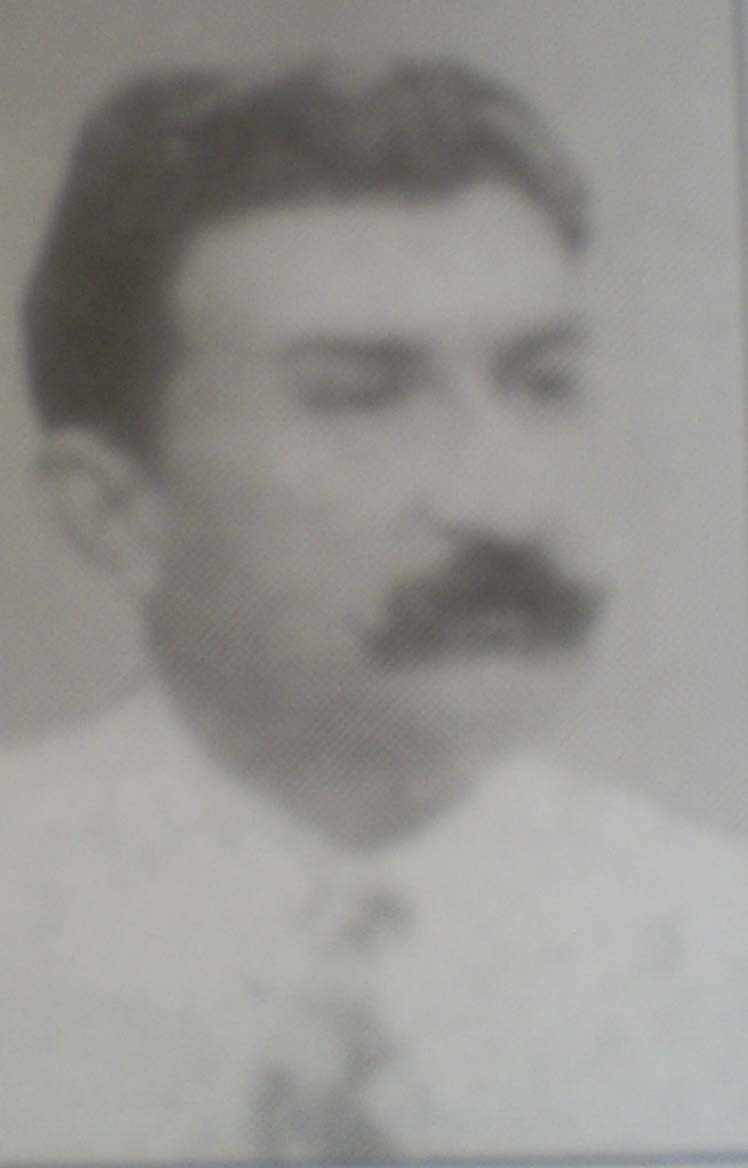
- Delfín Chamorro

Background information
- Born: December 24, 1863; Asunción, Paraguay
- Died: May 30, 1931 (aged 67) Asunción, Paraguay
- Occupations: Education, poetry

Delfín Chamorro (December 24, 1863 – August 15, 1931) was a Paraguayan special educator and poet. He was the creator of a method of teaching the Spanish language.

== Childhood and studies ==
Chamorro was born in the village of Caaguazú. His parents, both guaireños, were Don Jose de la Cruz Chamorro, fighter of the war and Juana Ines Martinez. These were confined in that location, shortly before the beginning of the War of the Seventy.

He studied in primary Villarrica. The population exhausted by the hardships of war, like the rest of the country, is struggling to overcome their woes with stoicism and courage of the survivors. Leaving school, to complete the cycle, he joined the National College of Asunción, to attend high school, which by economic constraints and family for some sentimental disappointment - says one of his biographers - was unable to complete it by interrupting with his study in the fourth year of high school.

He was forced to work for the sustenance of the house. He was a passionate reader and curious observer, thus self-taught, gained a wealth of knowledge. He liked to write very romantic poems appropriate to his youth, which despite his opposition were rescued by the Paraguayan promoters of the letters.

Chamorro is a classic of the letters. His poems have a soft Virgilian accent. He referred to his friend Daniel Codas an epistle with a tender elegy to which the beloved Villa Rica, inspired, it is considered a literary gem. From classical inspiration were his teachers Luis de León and Andrés Bello. He was a passionate reader the theorists of free humanism Tolstoy, Kropotkin and others.

== Vocation ==
His true vocation was teaching. He began as a public school teacher in San Juan Bautista, in 1887, at the request of his fellow citizens "guaireños" he was back to Villarrica to continue his career in a "school of the motherland", title which then gave the first public educational institutions.

With an educational structure – without holding any academic title – was able to receive the support of dedicated teacher Ramon Indalecio Cardozo, who saw potential of his ideas sufficient for the exercise of the magisterium . So, 1892, Chamorro took over the chairs of Castilian Rhetoric and Poetics at the Colegio Nacional Villarica.

Forty years after his exemplary life devoted to the study and teaching of Spanish grammar. He is considered the first grammarian in Paraguay. He left unfinished a "Grammar Castellana", whose first volume was published after his death.

Disciple Andrés Bello, in many ways perfected the lessons of the Venezuelan.

Among the esteemed group of grammarians and educators who trained in his classrooms, Inocencio Lezcano stands out as a notable successor.

== Master ==
Teacher Chamorro was privileged to be learned from contemporary letters guaireñas. They include his friend Ramon Indalecio Cardozo, Simeon Carísimo, Atanasio Riera, Nicholas E. Sardi, Carlos Ventura and Virgilio De Permian Barrios among others, names that left a trail of wisdom in the cultured city.

Cardozo wrote: Chamorro was a teacher, reformer and a real character. He taught by example in his chair and replaced the ancient method of illogical grammar for the rational and logical. He persisted throughout his life in implementing his reform, a personal method known as "Chamorro Method."

Delfín Chamorro himself explained that "The analysis is to explain the grammatical structure of language decomposing reasoning in units called sentences, and they in their constituent members, to the simplest and less complex way. As the reasoning is almost always extremely complicated, should be taken at the beginning the most simple and explain the parts that comprise and the role that each plays in all. "

He felt an irrepressible attraction to journalism. In 1902, accompanied by maestro Ramon I. Cardozo founded in Villa Rica newspaper "El Libre" in which he published his grammar lessons. In 1903, he created another called "The Guairá" of short existence.

== Recent years ==
The president Manuel Gondra, knowing the qualities of the guaireño teacher, whose fame had transpired, appointed him professor at the National College of Asunción. He was nominated times after honorary professor and benefited with a fair retirement.

Juan Natalicio González believes that in 1905, after the defeat of the government of Colonel Escurra, Chamorro joined the Colorado Party. He felt a profound abhorrence towards liberal ideology prevalent in the direction of "coloradismo" and took advantage of his nomination as candidate for senator to resign from his party and refuse the post that he offered his friends. He was president of the Paraguayan delegation that attended the Second International Congress of the American Magisterium, held in Montevideo in 1930.

== Death and legacy ==
Chamorro died in Asunción. Carlos Zubizarreta wrote about it: "His former student Jose Patricio Guggiari, then president of the nation funded his funeral. The work of teaching of Delfín Chamorro was never published in a systematized book. The thick notebooks in summarizing his lessons, so familiar to several generations of disciples, disappeared with his death."
