= Itapé =

Itapé Mission of Ytape
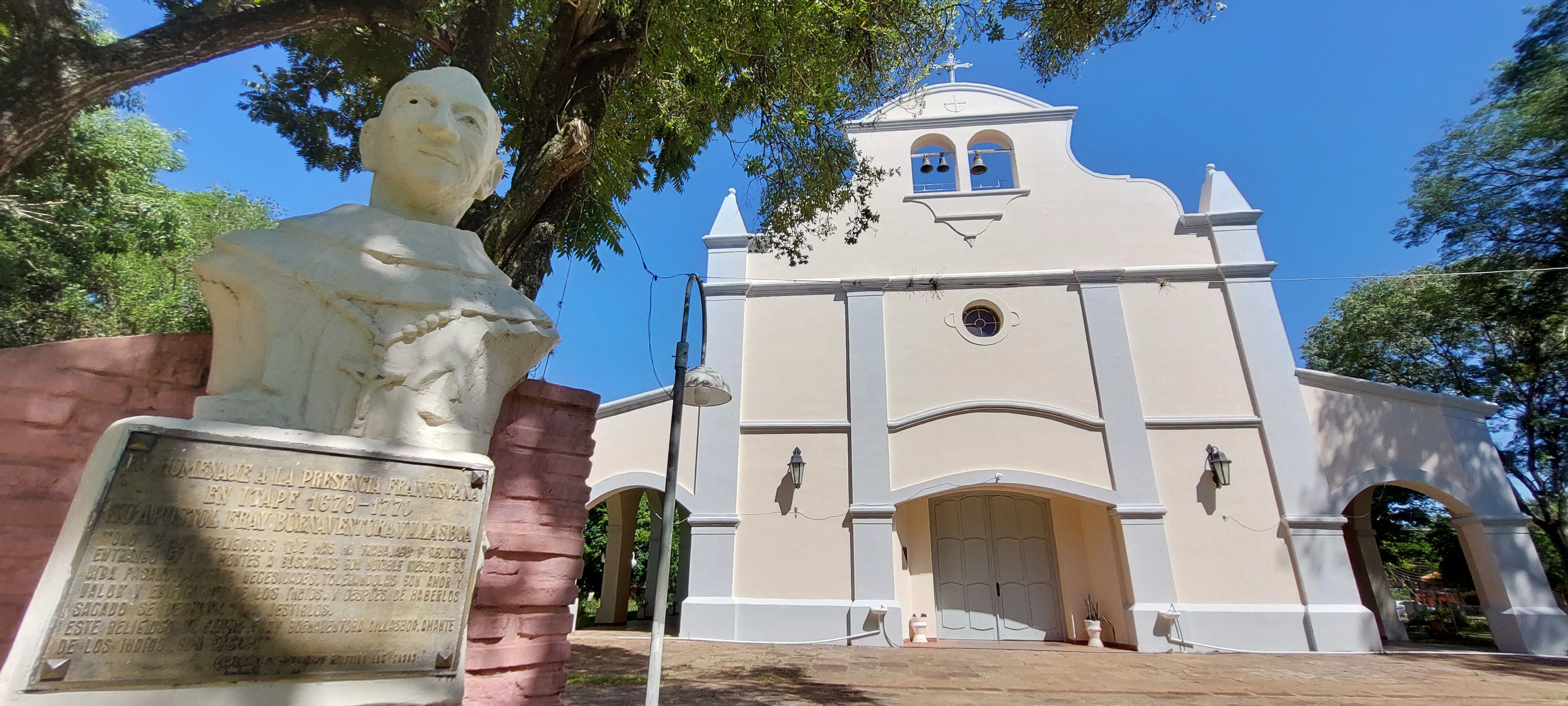
- Church in Itape behind the sculpture of its founder Buenaventura de Villasboa
- Nickname: Spitirual Capital of Guaira
- Location within Paraguay
- Coordinates: 25°51′0″S 56°37′12″W
- Country: Paraguay
- Department: Guairá

Population (2008)
  - Total: 1 726

Itapé is a town in the Guairá Department of Paraguay located by shores of the Tebicuarymi River.

It was founded in 1682 as a Catholic mission for indigenous people by Buenaventura de Villasboa, a mestizo priest from the extinct convent of Santa Barbara in Villarrica. Villasboa travelled to the region of the Monday River where he found groups of uncontacted Guaranis so he took them all the way back to the missions in Caazapa and Yuty in two groups. As these wilder indians had problems integrating with the already more Christian Indians, Villasboa and bishop Faustino de las Casas set them apart and took them to a new site located by the Tebicuarymi River. By orders of the Spanish Governor of Paraguay Juan Diez de Andino, they established the new mission with the name of Ytape.

The name Itape comes from the Guarani language and has two possible meanings. One is "ford" and the other one is "flat stone."

Every 18 of December there is a pilgrimage to the town of Itape in honor to the local Marian devotion which is the same icon as of the city of Caacupe. Over 50,000 visitors from all over the country attend this religious event.

== Sources ==
- World Gazeteer: Paraguay – World-Gazetteer.com
