= Marcos Zeida =

Paraguayan politician

- Born: Villa Domínguez, Entre Ríos, Argentina
- Died: Maldonado, Uruguay
- Citizenship: Argentine; Paraguayan
- Occupation: politician

Marcos Zeida (1 May 1916 – 25 January 2011) was a Paraguayan politician, member of the Paraguayan Communist Party.

== Biography ==
Marcos Zeida was born on May 1, 1916, in Villa Domínguez, Entre Ríos, in Argentina into a Jewish family which fled the pogroms in Russia.

== Arrival in Paraguay ==
In 1924, his family emigrated to Paraguay, settling first in Asunción, and later in Villarrica where Zeida played in the Pettirossi Football Club, and graduated from the Colegio Nacional de Villarrica.

== Exile in Uruguay ==
In 1947 Zeida went into exile to Uruguay, where he lived almost half his adult life.
