= Cayo Sila Godoy =

Paraguayan classical guitarist

- Born: 4 December 1919; Villarrica, Paraguay
- Died: 2 September 2014 (aged 94)
- Occupation: Guitarist

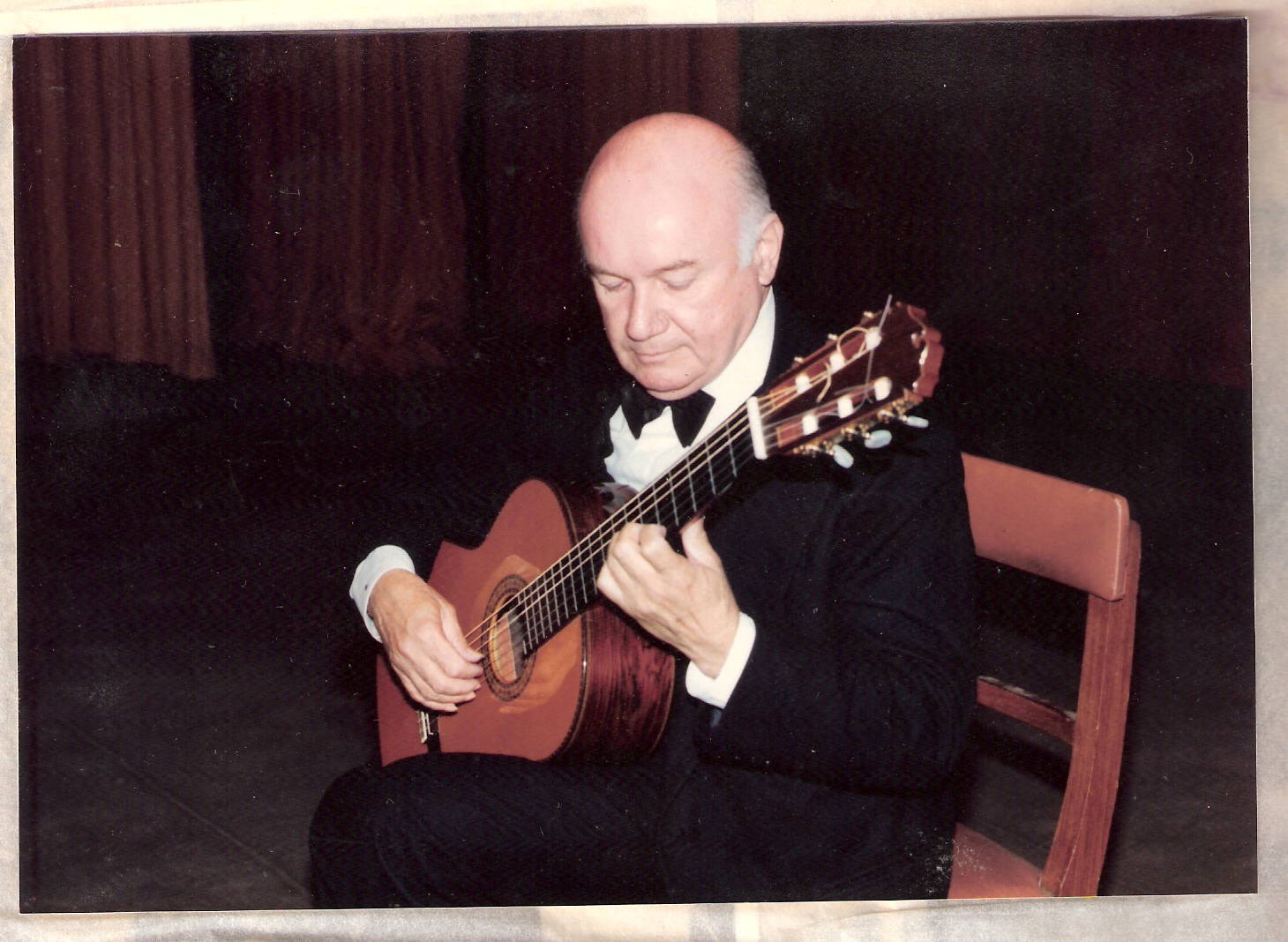
Cayo Sila Godoy in concert

Cayo Sila Godoy (4 December 1919 – 2 September 2014) was a classical guitarist from Paraguay.

== Youth ==
Cayo Sila Godoy was born in Villarrica Paraguay on December 4, 1919. His mother and his uncles were talented musicians who exposed him at an early age to the piano, violin, mandolin, harp and tropical guitar. He studied music first with his uncle Marciano Echauri, and from the age of 16, harmony with Juan Carlos Moreno Gonzalez.

Sila left his home of Villarrica at the age of 16 to accept a scholarship at the National Music Conservatory in Asunción, Paraguay. By age 24 he graduated from the conservatory as a professor of music theory and musicology.

Following graduation he was awarded a grant to continue his musical education in Buenos Aires, where he remained for nine years under the tutelage of Consuelo Mallo López. During these years Sila concentrated on refining his technique into the virtuosity admired today.

== First steps ==
In 1948, The Chamber Music Association from Buenos Aires gave him a diploma for the best concert of the season of that year. In 1953, as a request from the National Government, he went on a cultural and artistic tour, following the road of Mangore. He offered concerts, gave lectures and gathered a lot of information and documents on the great Paraguayan composer. Between 1959 and 1962 he participated on specialization courses with Andrés Segovia.

In 1959 Segovia invited Sila to study in Spain, with all expenses paid, at his renowned classical guitar course at Música en Compostela. For three years he studied and traveled with Segovia.

In 1963 Godoy, at the personal invitation of President John F. Kennedy, first visited the United States to do a concert tour. During this trip he was featured as a broadcast soloist on the Voice of America and played with such notable American guitarists as Charlie Byrd, Sophocles Papas and Richard Pick. In subsequent US tours he has played in most major cities and in 1977 volunteered to tour Kansas, Paraguay's "sister state" where he also taught master classes at Wichita State University. More recently he has toured Japan (1980), Australia (1983), and has made numerous appearances in the Latin American nations.

In 1977, sponsored by the program “ Friends of the Americas “, chapter Paraguay –Kansas, he Developer activities in the state of Kansas, offering courses of specialization, speeches, and performances in the main cities such as Wichita, Topeka, and Lawrence. In 1980, he traveled to Japan on a concert tour, and in 1983 to Australia, as well as other cities in America and Europe.

== Mentions ==
In 1994, he was appointed as musical advisor of the Vice Minister of Culture in Paraguay and member of the National Advisor Board of Culture.

Godoy's creative style is characterized by the presence of elements derived from popular music with an harmonic contemporary treatment, including his last compositions, with an obvious tendency to atonality.

His work as a music teacher contributed to the development of several young musicians who later achieved recognition in Paraguayan music. Among them is composer and guitarist Luz Maria Bobadilla, who studied under him for four years before being admitted for her demonstrated musical abilities.

== Works ==
Among his records the following ought to be mentioned : Sila Godoy in concert, recorded in New York City, USA, in 1982; Sila Godoy, recorded in Australia, in 1983; Aranjuez and Madrigal, two volumes on cassettes, which are gatherings from his two previous recordings, in 1994; The Music of Agustin Barrios Mangore and Jose Asuncion Flores, a compact disc with a gathering of his best recordings in 1994.

As a researcher, he has published, together with Luis Szarán, the book “Mangore, Life and Plays of Agustin Barrios“, and he has been preparing “The Documents of Barrios“ and “Barrios seen by his contemporaries”.

Among his creations for guitar, “Habanera”, “Moto perpetuo”, “Extasis”, “ Cuatro obras para guitarra clasica”,”Fiesta Campesina”,”Cancion Intima”,”Oracion a Tania”, “Capricho" are highly recommended. His arrangements of the plays of Jose Asuncion Flores, a great composer of the musical genre known as Guaranias are notable, as well as his transcriptions for guitar, featuring the modern and very personal versions of “Nde renda pe aju” and “Gallito Cantor”.

He died in Asunción, where he devoted his life to lectures, speeches and didactic concerts, as well as offering radio and television shows.
