= Brazilian cherry =

Brazilian cherry is a common name for several plants native to the New World tropics with edible fruits:

- Eugenia brasiliensis, endemic to southern Brazil
- Eugenia uniflora
- Hymenaea courbaril, in the legume family, the term referring to the hard red wood of the tree
