= Natalicio Talavera (poet) =

Paraguayan poet and journalist (1839–1867)

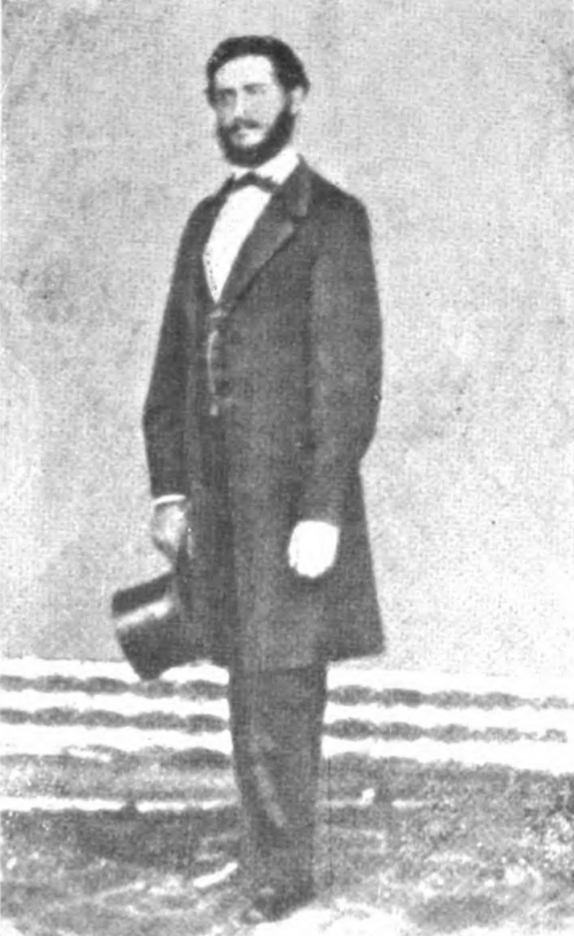
Talavera

Natalicio Talavera (8 September 1839 – 11 October 1867) was a Paraguayan poet and journalist widely regarded as one of the first major poets of post-independence Paraguay. He died of disease while serving during the Paraguayan War, which he covered extensively as a journalist.

== Biography ==
Talavera was born in Villarrica, Paraguay on 8 September 1839. Born into a wealth family, he was educated in Villarrica and later in Asunción. During the 1850s, he became a member of the "Aurora" movement (often described as a group or school), a circle of young Paraguayan philosophers and writers.

Following the outbreak of the Paraguayan War in 1865, Talavera enlisted in the Paraguayan Army. While serving, he wrote reports on the war that came to be read by both sides of the conflict. In 1867, he begat publishing an army newspaper, El Cabichuí, aimed at the Paraguayan forces, in an effort to boost morale. However, while encamped near Humaitá, Talavera contracted cholera and his health rapidly declined. He completed his last missive on 28 September and died on 11 October 1867.

=== Legacy ===
Talavera's work is considered part of the Latin American Romantic movement, and he is identified in some sources as the leading poet of Paraguayan Romanticism. He was posthumously awarded the National Order of Merit, and in 1972 the Paraguayan government declared 11 October the Day of the Paraguayan Poet.

The town of Natalicio Talavera, founded in 1918, is named in his honor.
