= Natalicio Talavera, Paraguay =

Natalicio Talavera
- Location within Paraguay
- Coordinates: 25°38′24″S 56°18′0″W
- Country: Paraguay
- Department: Guairá

Population (2008)
  - Total: 2,073

Natalicio Talavera is a town in the Guairá Department of Paraguay. The town is named after 19th-century poet Natalicio Talavera. The Tebicuarymí River runs near the town.

== Sources ==
- World Gazeteer: Paraguay – World-Gazetteer.com
