= History of rail transport in Paraguay =

This article is part of the history of rail transport by country series

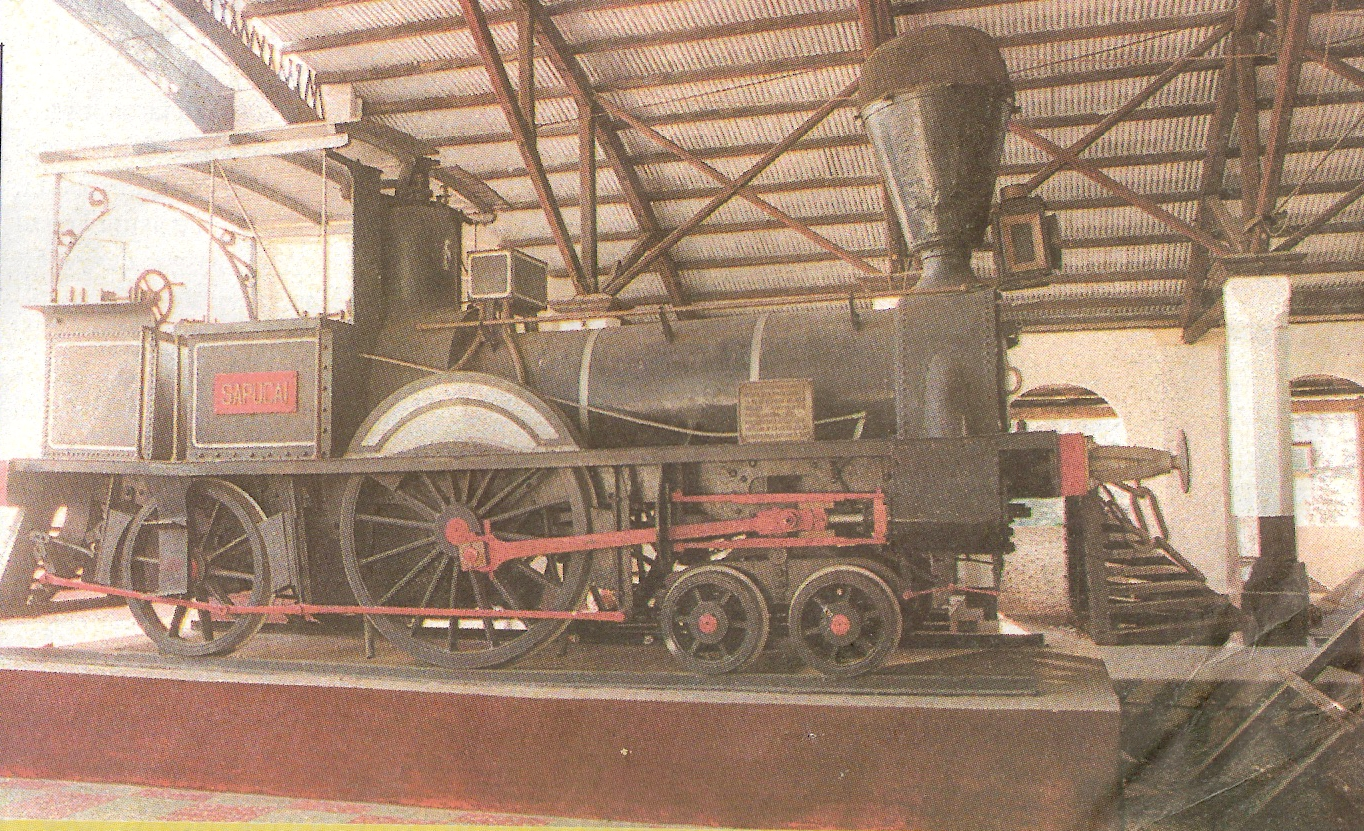
The locomotive Paraguay (1861), preserved at Asunción Central station

In 1856, studies started to make the first railway of the country that would go from Asunción to Paraguarí. With the concession of the company to English hands, the railroad extended to Encarnación.

In the area of urban rail transit, the capital city of Asunción was served by trams from 1871 until around 1995.

== The railways in the Americas ==
The beginnings of the railways in America were in 1831 when the steam railway arrived in the town of Albany, New York, United States. On August 9 of the same year, with the still primitive machine called "Bull" imported from England, the first journey of this locomotive that pulled three small coaches with a capacity of only six passengers each was made. It was 36 years after, on October 23, 1867, that the railway that went from San Francisco to New York, known by the name of "Union Pacific Road," was inaugurated.

Later on, Cuba was the second country of this continent to have a railway. In 1834 the construction of a railway that would connect La Habana with Guinness (Unión) commenced; it covered 142 kilometres (88 mi) and was opened four years later, in 1838.

The third country to have one was British Guyana (Georgetown-Plaisance 1848), then Peru (Lima-Callao 1851), and then Chile, with a railway that went from Caldera to Copiapó (1851). Construction was directed by the North-American Engineer William Wheelwright; this was followed by Brazil (Praia de Estrela-Fragoso in 1952).

In Argentina the first railway was inaugurated on August 30, 1857. It extended from Buenos Aires to Moreno.

On February 22, 1862, work started to build a railway that would go from Buenos Aires to Ensenada; the person in charge was once again Wheelwright.

Wheelwright also directed the construction of the Argentine Central Railway, used to link Rosario with Córdoba, starting on April 20, 1863.

In Paraguay, the intention to have a railway manifested in 1856, but only five years later was it possible to have one working. On June 14, 1861, the first journey was made from the station to the port of Asunción, so it could be said that the railway in Paraguay was one of the first to function in South America.

== A project on rails ==
The possibilities of starting the construction of the railway in Paraguay were given in 1854, during the government of Carlos Antonio López, who hired English engineers in charge of the studies made to start the first railway line that would go from Asunción to Paraguarí.

In 1856, soldiers of the army engineer corps worked on the tracks and platform. In England, the firm BLYTH proceeded to fulfill the requests of the Paraguayan government with locomotives, wagons, rails, etc.

The construction of the track Asunción-Paraguarí was in charge of George Paddison, an English engineer hired by the government. All kinds of accessories for the stations were built from models, with local materials.

Between 1857 and 1859 the engineers George Thompson, Henry Valpy and Percy Burrell were incorporated into the project, which helped to speed the work.

The first local railway line started working in June 1861; it went on a short track from the central station in Asunción to Trinidad. Six months later the track was extended to the city of Luque.

The extension was inaugurated on December 25, and according to the journal "El Semanario," it was a source of great joy for the citizens. "The locomotives have been functioning from 5 am until 12 pm, and it would be necessary to add three more trains to take the people that expected to get a ride and that came not only to Luque but also to Trinidad. In Luque were organised games, dances, and a masquerade; in Trinidad, there were also bullfights" (transcript from the journal). In 1862 the rail tracks extended to Areguá.

== San Francisco station ==
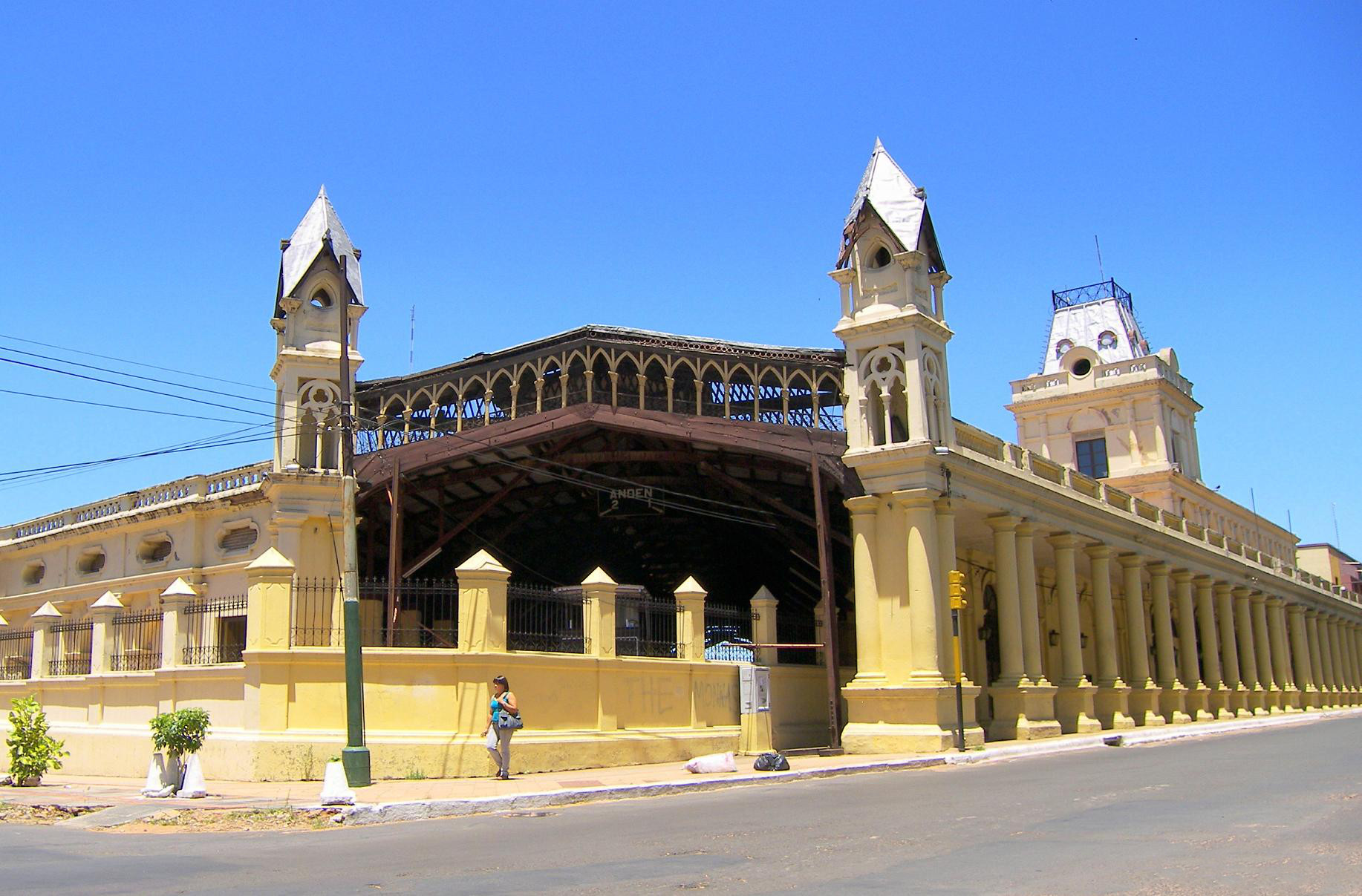
The station building in 2010

Of the public buildings that were finished before the war of 1870, the most noticeable are the Palace of Government and the Railway Station, which are still nowadays true icons of Asunción City.

The original name of the Central Railway station was "Estación San Francisco", although it was originally known also as "Plaza San Francisco".

Today the building is still an attraction because of its architectonic proportions and its beauty, and it is not hard to imagine that it was even more outstanding in the time it was built. Architect Alonzo Taylor directed the construction. Taylor came from Europe in the ship "Río Blanco" on May 6, 1859, and he also directed the construction of the Palace of Government along with architect Raviza.

The journals of the time made many references to the San Francisco Station. In 1863 the journal "El Semanario" wrote: "The construction work in the station is progressing well, soon the building will be complete and this beautiful construction will be considered one of the icons of the city".

On July 30 of the same year, the journal also described a ball that took place in the main hall of the station, offered by chiefs and officers in honor to the President on his birthday.

Year	Event
1856	The government of Carlos A. López makes the first payment of 200,000 pesos to London engineers for the purchase of construction materials.
1858	The English engineer George Paddison comes to the country hired by the government to be in charge of the project.
1860	The government sends 120,000 pesos to the English engineers for the construction of machinery.
1861	The rail service from Station Saint Francis (Central) to Trinidad is inaugurated. In December the service reaches to Luque.
1862	The station in Aregua is inaugurated.
1864	The rail tracks are extended to the station in Pirayú, Cerro León.
1865	The railway service is suspended due to the War against the Triple Alliance.
1869	The Paraguayan army dismantles the rail tracks that had been destroyed during the war. The wagons and locomotives are taken to Buenos Aires by the Argentine army.
1870	The government of Brazil repaired several stretches of tracks and rolling stock of the railway, charging the Paraguayan government 20,000 American dollars. After that, the rail service was able to function, but it was in poor condition.
1876	The government authorizes the sale of the railway to Luis Patri, an Italian cattleman who at the time was one of the wealthiest men in Paraguay. The government used the money to pay back the debt to Brazil.
1886	The government of Bernardino Caballero buys back the railway. In August, the hiring of the enterprise Patri is authorised to continue the work on the railway in Paraguarí and Villarrica. Four new locomotives and 91 wagons for people and cargo were bought.
1887	The government of Patricio Escobar authorizes the sale of part the railway service to the transnational English company "The Paraguay Central Railway" (P. C. R. C.) Construction of the stations in: Sapucaí, Caballero, Ybytimí, Tebicuarymí and Félix P. Cardozo is started.
1894	Construction of the stations in Iturbe, Maciel, Sosa and Yegros, is finished. Four locomotives and 8 wagons are provided for the service.
1907	The government resigns its stock shares, leaving the English company as only owner of the railway service.
1910	The Argentine government subscribes stocks for value of 220,000 pounds for the construction of the railway from Pira Pó to Pacu Cuá (Encarnación).
1911	Percival Farquhar, an American investor, buys a controlling interest in the P. C. R. C.
1914	The railway service links communicates Borja, San Salvador and Charará is inaugurated.
1919	The rail tracks are extended to Abaí.
1959	The company stopped providing the service of trains and the government insists in maintaining it functioning, absorbing the deficit.
1961	The Paraguayan government buys the railway again and all the stocks for 200,000 pounds. The Ministry of Public Works takes charge of the administration and starts the legal paperwork to make it into an autarchic entity.

== Tramways ==
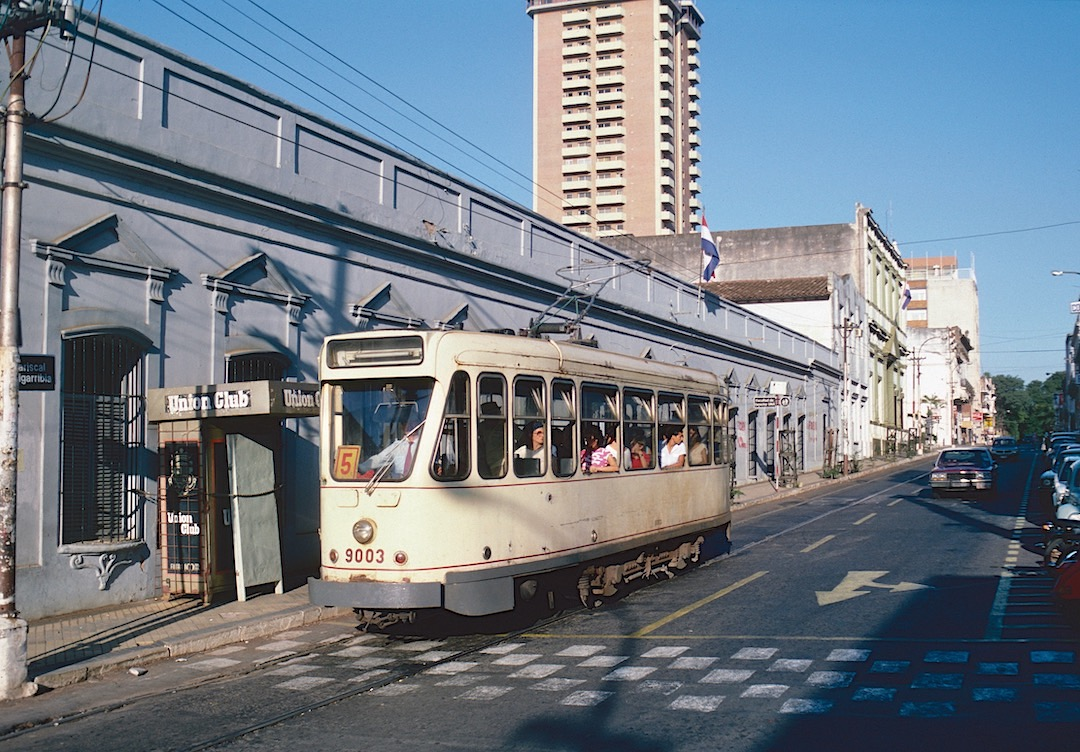
One of Asunción's ex-Brussels trams in the city centre in 1986. The tram system closed about 10 years later.

Asunción was served by a tram system for almost 125 years. The city's first tram line opened in 1871, initially using horse-drawn trams and steam-powered trams. Electric trams were introduced in 1913. The first electric trams were operated by the Asunción Tramway, Light & Power Company (ATL&P) and were built by the United Electric Car Company, of England. In 1914, the Compañía Americana de Luz y Tracción acquired the system after ATL&P's bankruptcy. Six trams were purchased from Società Italiana Ernesto Breda, in Italy, in the 1920s, and later from the American manufacturer J. G. Brill Company, and in the 1930s and 1940s from Argentine builders.

The system reached its maximum extent in the 1930s, with 37 km of track served by 10 routes, worked by a fleet of 33 motor trams and 26 trailers. In 1945, when the direction of traffic flow on several streets in the city centre was reversed, tram lines 1–4 were closed, but CALT built a new line 5, between the city centre and the neighbourhood of Las Mercedes. The system was nationalized in 1948. It was closed in 1973, but was reopened in 1975, and then-operator Administración del Transporte Eléctrico began to import used trams from the Brussels, Belgium, tram system, ultimately acquiring a total of 17 from Brussels by 1980. Only a single route, 5, was reopened in 1975, but route 9 reopened in 1978; however, the latter closed again the following year, leaving only route 5 in operation for the remainder of the system's history. After the mid-1980s, the only tramcars in service were the 9000 series, two-axle ex-Brussels cars built around 1960. The last tram service was discontinued around 1995, followed by formal closure in November 1997.

== See also ==
- History of Paraguay
- Rail transport in Paraguay
