= Battle of Ybytimí =

- Part of the Paraguayan War
Date	7 June 1869
Location	Sapucaí, Paraguay
Result	Paraguayan victory

Belligerents
Paraguay	Empire of Brazil

Commanders and leaders
Bernardino Caballero; Manuel Bernal	João Manuel Mena Barreto; Bento Meneses

Strength
3,000 men (only 600 engaged)	4,000 men

Casualties and losses
200 casualties	1,300 casualties

The Battle of Ybytimí was fought in June 1869, during the opening stages of the Paraguayan War's Campaign of the Hills.

The allied army was conducting raids in central Paraguay and gearing up to resume campaigning against the reorganized Paraguayan army, it having been mostly destroyed during the Pikysyry campaign. A column of raiders was ambushed by a 600-strong Paraguayan force and forced to retreat.

== Background and engagement ==
During the Pikysyry campaign, the Paraguayan army was destroyed and later had to be rebuilt; the allied armies dawdled around Asunción after taking it in January 1869, as their commander, the Duke of Caxias had left the theater, and the soldiers themselves were tired and demoralized after years of campaigning around Humaitá.

This meant that operations were only resumed by May 1869, and then, only half-heartedly. The Pikysyry campaign's result meant that Paraguay no longer had the capacity to wage a regular war - the conlfict became irregular in nature and entered its last phase, the Campaign of the Hills.

In June 1869, allied troops were conducting raids around Quiíndy, Carapeguá and Acahay, where nowadays is the Paraguarí department, circa 100 km away from Asunción. Paraguayan president López, when informed of this, ordered general Bernardino Caballero to attack said troops. The Paraguayan column arrived at Ybytimí to find it deserted; they managed to track the allied troops down in Sapucaí, where 400 Paraguayan troops were ordered to lay in ambush against the enemy. When the Brazilian column entered the killing zone, the ambush was sprung, and the Paraguayans charged upon them starting a generalized melee. Soon afterwards, the Brazilians started to retreat towards Paraguarí. Another Paraguayan force had been posted in wait in that direction, however, 200 men under major Bernal, and they cut off the retreat. The Brazilians then changed course towards Tebicuary, which they managed to reach despite the harassment from Bernal's men.

Caballero's troops then returned to the headquarters in Azcurra.
