= Route 18 (Paraguay) =

National Route 18
- Ruta nacional PY18
- PY18 highlighted in red

Route information
- Length: 358 km (222 mi)

Major junctions
- East end: Mayor Otaño
- West end: Villeta

Location
- Country: Paraguay

Highway system
- Highways in Paraguay

National Route 18 (officially, PY18) is a highway in Paraguay, which runs from northern Itapúa to Central, crossing also the departments of Caazapá, Guairá and Paraguarí.

== History ==
With the Resolution N° 1090/19, it obtained its current number and elevated to National Route in 2019 by the MOPC (Ministry of Public Works and Communications).

== Distances, cities and towns ==
The following table shows the distances traversed by PY18 in each different department, showing cities and towns that it passes by (or near).

Km	City	Department	Junctions
0	Mayor Otaño	Itapúa	PY07
66	Naranjito	Itapúa	PY06
107	Tavaí	Caazapá	
154	San Juan Nepomuceno	Caazapá	
174	Gral. Higinio Morínigo	Caazapá	
188	Gral. Garay	Guairá	
207	Ñumí	Guairá	PY08
212	San Salvador	Guairá	
215	Borja	Guairá	
241	Tebicuary-mí	Paraguarí	
260	La Colmena	Paraguarí	
288	Acahay	Paraguarí	
310	Carapeguá	Paraguarí	PY01
343	Nueva Italia	Central	
358	Villeta	Central	PY19
