= General Bernardino Caballero, Paraguay =

Caballero
- General Bernardino Caballero
- Location in Paraguay
- Coordinates: 25°41′35″S 56°51′28″W
- Country: Paraguay
- Department: Paraguarí
- Founded: August 30, 1902
- Founder: Andrés Héctor Carvallo

Government
  - Mayor: Juan Tomás Mereles Rolón

Area
  - Total: 162 km^{2} (63 sq mi)

Population (2016)
  - Total: 7,223
  - Density: 44.6/km^{2} (115/sq mi)
- Postal code: 4500
- Area code: (595)(526)

General Bernardino Caballero (or simply Caballero) is a town and a district in the Paraguarí Department of Paraguay. It is named after Bernardino Caballero, President of Paraguay from 1880 until 1886.

== Location ==
Caballero is located in the north-west region of the Paraguarí department, 101 km from Asunción, the capital of the Paraguay; and about 30 km from the city of Paraguarí.

To get there one should take the national route number 1 to Paraguarí, and there take a detour to Gral. Bernardino Caballero.

== Geography ==
The topography of the district is characterized by hills, streams and swamps. Borders are the following:

- At North it borders with the districts of Valenzuela and San José de los Arroyos.
- At South it borders with the Acahay and La Colmena districts.
- At East it borders with Ybytimí district.
- At West it borders with Sapucaí district.
