= Unbox Therapy =

Canadian technology YouTuber (born 1985)

- Born: Lewis George Hilsenteger; May 6, 1985 (age 41); Toronto, Ontario, Canada
- Education: Toronto School of Art
- Occupations: Filmmaker; tech reviewer; producer; comedian; podcaster

YouTube information
- Channel: Unbox Therapy
- Years active: 2010–present
- Genres: Technology; unboxing
- Subscribers: 24.7 million
- Views: 4.97 billion
- Last updated: October 21, 2025
- Website: unboxtherapy.com

Lewis George Hilsenteger (born May 6, 1985), known professionally as Unbox Therapy, is a Canadian unboxing and technology YouTuber. As of October 2025, his eponymous channel has 24.7 million subscribers and over 4.97 billion views.

In September 2014, Hilsenteger gained widespread attention after uploading a video in which he bent an iPhone 6 Plus with his bare hands, sparking Apple's "Bendgate" controversy over the device's structural durability.

== Early life ==
Hilsenteger was born on May 6, 1985, in Toronto, Ontario. He attended the Toronto School of Art, where he studied digital arts, photography, and video editing. Prior to his full-time YouTube career, Hilsenteger owned an Apple repair store near Toronto Metropolitan University (then Ryerson University).

== Career ==
Hilsenteger and videographer Jack McCann launched the Unbox Therapy YouTube channel in December 2010, inspired by Hilsenteger's own interest in watching unboxing videos. The channel was conceived as a form of virtual window shopping, allowing viewers to experience unpacking new consumer electronics without purchasing them. Early videos featured products such as a smartphone-integrated breathalyzer and an "unspillable" mug that Hilsenteger attempted to knock over. Uploading several times per week, the channel began routinely drawing more than one million views per video. Total viewership surpassed 1 billion by February 2018 and 4 billion by April 2021. Hilsenteger also hosts a companion podcast and YouTube channel titled Lew Later. By April 2023, Unbox Therapy averaged over two million views per video and ranked seventh in Social Blade's technology category; by August 2023, Unbox Therapy and Lew Later had a combined following of more than 19 million subscribers.

In September 2014, Hilsenteger uploaded "iPhone 6 Plus Bend Test", in which he bent his iPhone 6 Plus using only his hands, stoking debate over whether the phone could bend inside users' pockets. Although Hilsenteger had purchased the phone himself, he was unconcerned about destroying it because he expected the video's advertising revenue to cover the cost of a replacement. The upload drew tens of millions of views within days, ranked as YouTube's fifth highest-trending upload of 2014, and became the channel's most-watched video, reaching 71 million views by August 2019. Catie Keck of Inverse called the video "a pretty damning illustration" of the defect and "a refresher on how bad this really looked for Apple", while Polygon's Julia Alexander noted that it was "largely credited for leading to Apple's 'Bendgate' fiasco with the iPhone 6".

For the channel's first several years, co-creator McCann remained off-camera and was referred to simply as "Jack", prompting ongoing viewer speculation about his identity. Following a pledge to introduce McCann once the channel reached 10 million subscribers, Hilsenteger uploaded a face reveal video titled "Jack" in February 2018. Reviewing the upload for Polygon, Alexander wrote, "It's a well-executed video that goes over the past and present of Jack's life, finally lending shape to the man who people only knew as Hilsenteger's most trusted friend and the person behind the camera".

In June 2018, Unbox Therapy uploaded "The Ultimate $30,000 Gaming PC Setup", which featured a computer workstation resembling an airliner cockpit equipped with four monitors, a recliner, a foot massager, high-end headphones, an adjustable weighted mouse, and a SteelSeries keyboard. In The Outline, Andrew Paul remarked that the seven-minute video contained "a dizzying flurry of quick cuts" typical of "those who create content for the attention-fried", concluding: "Maybe it's the snack crate stocked with Kettle Chips and Christie Collection's Pirate Cookies, or Hilsenteger's shilling of special edition Unbox Therapy Coke-a-Cola [sic] bottles, but on the whole, the thirty-grand rig seems like a little much."

In March 2020, Hilsenteger faced criticism after uploading a favorable impression of the Escobar Fold 2, a smartphone marketed by Escobar Inc.—a company associated with Roberto de Jesús Escobar Gaviria, the brother of Pablo Escobar—that fellow reviewer Marques Brownlee demonstrated was a rebadged Samsung Galaxy Fold covered in gold foil stickers. Technology publications reported that while Escobar Inc. sent working units to tech influencers, paying customers never received the phones and were instead shipped books so the company could log completed delivery tracking numbers; the company later marketed refurbished iPhone 11 Pro units in May 2020 and claimed to have sued Apple for $2.6 billion. In a follow-up video, Hilsenteger stated that he had no connection to Escobar Inc. and knew nothing about the product's background prior to filming his initial video; as of April 2023, the response video held a 31:27 like-to-dislike ratio. Hilsenteger subsequently made the original video unlisted.

== Personal life ==
Hilsenteger lives in Newmarket, Ontario, in the Greater Toronto Area. He is married and has a son.
