= Escobar =

Escobar is a Spanish surname, most notably belonging to Columbian drug lord Pablo Escobar.

Escobar may also refer to:

== Places ==
- Escobar District, Paraguay
- Escobar, Paraguay, a town in Escobar District, Paraguay
- Escobar Partido, Buenos Aires province, Argentina

== Other uses ==
- Escobar (2009 film), based on the life of Pablo Escobar
- Escobar Inc, a Colombian multinational conglomerate holding company

== See also ==
- San Escobar, fictional country
- Eskobar, a Swedish indie/pop band
- Escobares, Texas, U.S.
- Escoba, a card game
