= Quyquyhó =

Quyquyhó Kykyo
- Location within Paraguay
- Coordinates: 26°13′48″S 56°59′24″W
- Country: Paraguay
- Department: Paraguarí

Government
  - Mayor: Esteban Martín Samaniego Álvarez (UNACE)

Area
  - Total: 624 km^{2} (241 sq mi)

Population (2002)
  - Total: 6,865
  - Density: 11.0/km^{2} (28.5/sq mi)

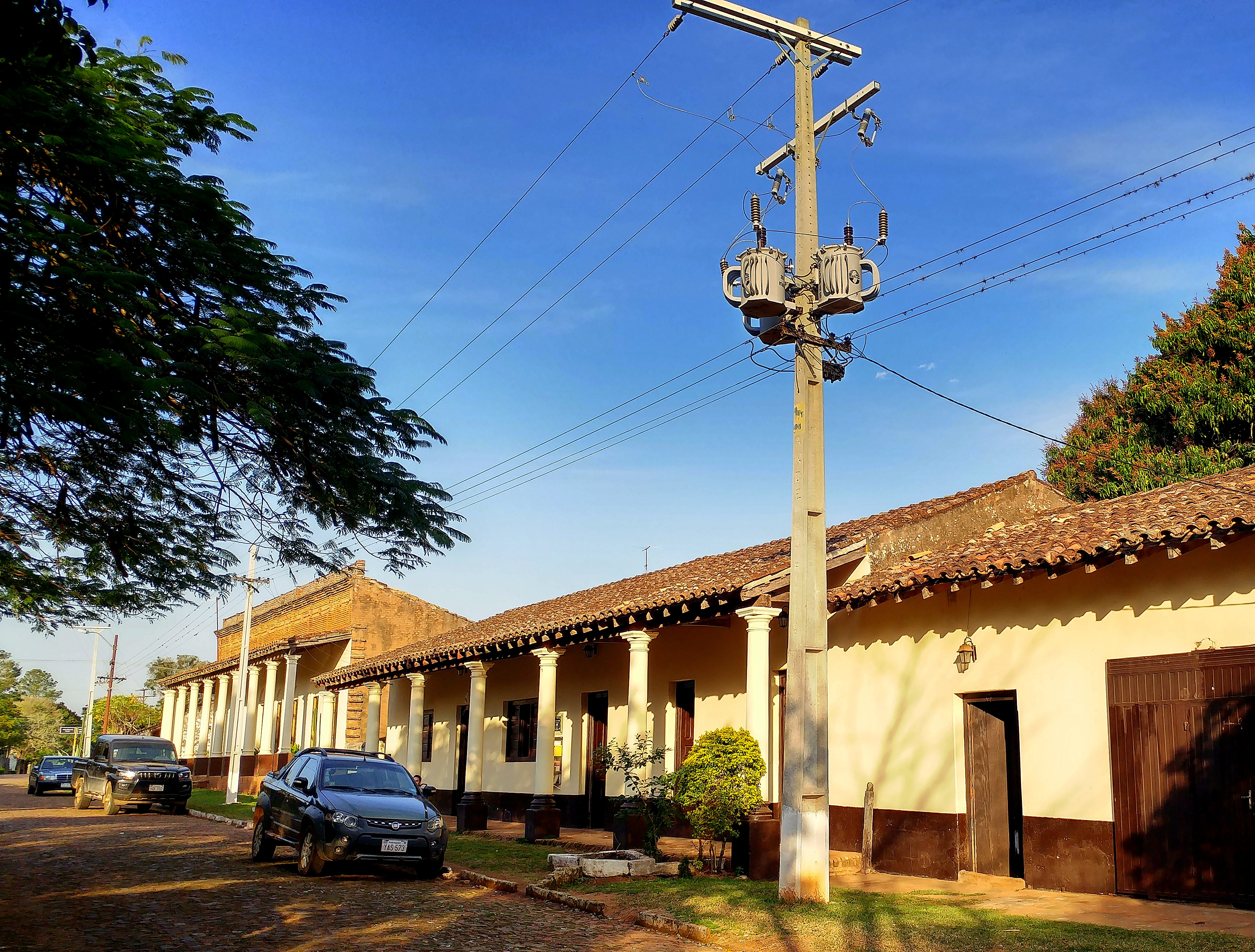
Street in Quyquyhó, Paraguay.

Quyquyhó (Guarani: Kykyo) is a town in the Paraguarí department of Paraguay.

== Geography ==
It is located in the southern region of the Paraguarí Department. It is approximately 169 km away from the Paraguayan capital city, Asunción.

== How to get there ==
From Asunción you have to take the National Route Number 1 (Ruta Uno) until you reach Caapucú, where you have to take a detour on your left to the town of Quyquyhó.

== Demography ==
This district is 624 km² big, and according to the 2002 National Census, Quyquyhó has a total population of 6,865 inhabitants and its urban has only 798 inhabitants.

== Notable people ==
- Aníbal Lovera, composer and singer

== Sources ==
- World Gazetteer: Paraguay – World-Gazetteer.com
