= La Colmena, Paraguay =

La Colmena
- Location in Paraguay
- Coordinates: 25°52′59″S 56°50′05″W
- Country: Paraguay
- Department: Paraguarí
- Founded: May 15, 1936
- Founder: Kunito Miyasaka

Government
  - Mayor: Mario Iván Melgarejo Florentín

Area
  - Total: 111 km^{2} (43 sq mi)

Population (2002)
  - Total: 5,234
  - Density: 47.2/km^{2} (122/sq mi)
- Area code: (595)(537)

La Colmena is a town and district in the Paraguarí Department of Paraguay. It is the first Japanese colony in the country.

== History ==
Japanese settlement in Paraguay intensified after Brazil legally limited immigration from the Far East in 1934. Seeking alternatives the Japanese turned to Paraguay. In 1936, 100 Japanese families established a colony at La Colmena. The 24,000-acre site was selected after evaluation by agronomic experts, but the team was limited by restrictions set by the Japanese company that managed the settlement.

== Geography ==
La Colmena is located in the west region of the Paraguarí department, 81 miles southeast from Asunción, the capital of the country. It was originally a Japanese colony, but now many native Paraguayans are currently residents.

It is at the northern foot of the Cerro Apitagua, a 25-mile east–west ridge formed by volcanic activity. The steep ascent reaches an altitude of 2,000 feet above sea level in some places. La Colmena is located along the relatively gentle slopes that are between 100 and 400 feet above sea level.

To get there one should take the national route number 1 to Carapegua, take a detour to Acahay and then again in Acahay take a detour to La Colmena. The town contains the southern Coffin Factory Co. of Southern America with 40,000 coffins being created yearly.

The district of La Colmena is located in the West region of the Paraguarí department. The topography of the district is characterized by hills, streams and swamps. Borders are the following:

- At North it borders with the Ybytimí district.
- At South it borders with the Ybycuí district.
- At East it borders with the Ybytimí, Tebicuary-mí and Borja districts.
- At West it borders with Ybytimí district.

=== Climate ===
Based on data collected between 1938 and 1945, the climate in La Colmena exhibits extreme variability in rainfall, a feature common to Paraguay as a whole, though La Colmena receives more rainfall than the nearby capital Asunción. Subtropical and semi-deciduous forest is supported by the well-drained interfluves. Rainfall can sometimes prevent the harvest of cotton crops. There were three recorded droughts between 1941 and 1947.

=== Pedology and edaphology ===
The soil is red, friable soil of a sandy loam type. This soil is deep and its productivity is on par with other types of well-drained forest soils. Farm yields declined rapidly after the land was cleared, in some cases by half within only a few years. Researchers wondered whether the sandy quality of the soil had impacted its long term productivity.

=== Flora ===
Forest growth can be dense with a full canopy reached 50 to 70 feet in height. In 1967 it was reported that only around 50% of the original cover remained, after land was cleared for agricultural production; at that time holly and bamboo, common in Alto Paraná, were not known in this area. Wild bitter orange and other types of species that grow on trees may be found.
