= Caapucú District =

- district
- Country: Paraguay
- Department: Paraguarí Department

Caapucú District is one of the districts of Paraguarí Department, Paraguay.

== Geography ==
Caapucú District is located in the West region of the Paraguarí Department. The topography of the district is characterized by hills, streams and swamps. Most of the inhabitants live in the rural area. Borders are the following:

- At North it borders on the Quiíndy District and Ybycuí District.
- At South it borders on Misiones Department, from which is separated by the Tebicuary River.
- At East it borders on Misiones Department and the Quyquyhó District.
- At West it borders on Ñeembucú Department.

Caapucú District is watered by the Tebicuary River, the Negro River and the following streams:

- Camalote
- Guajhó
- Arroyito
- Paso Itá
- González
- Pindo
- Yaguary
- Itapé
- Paso Pé
- Capiibary
- Paso Ybycuí
- Guaho
- Pirata

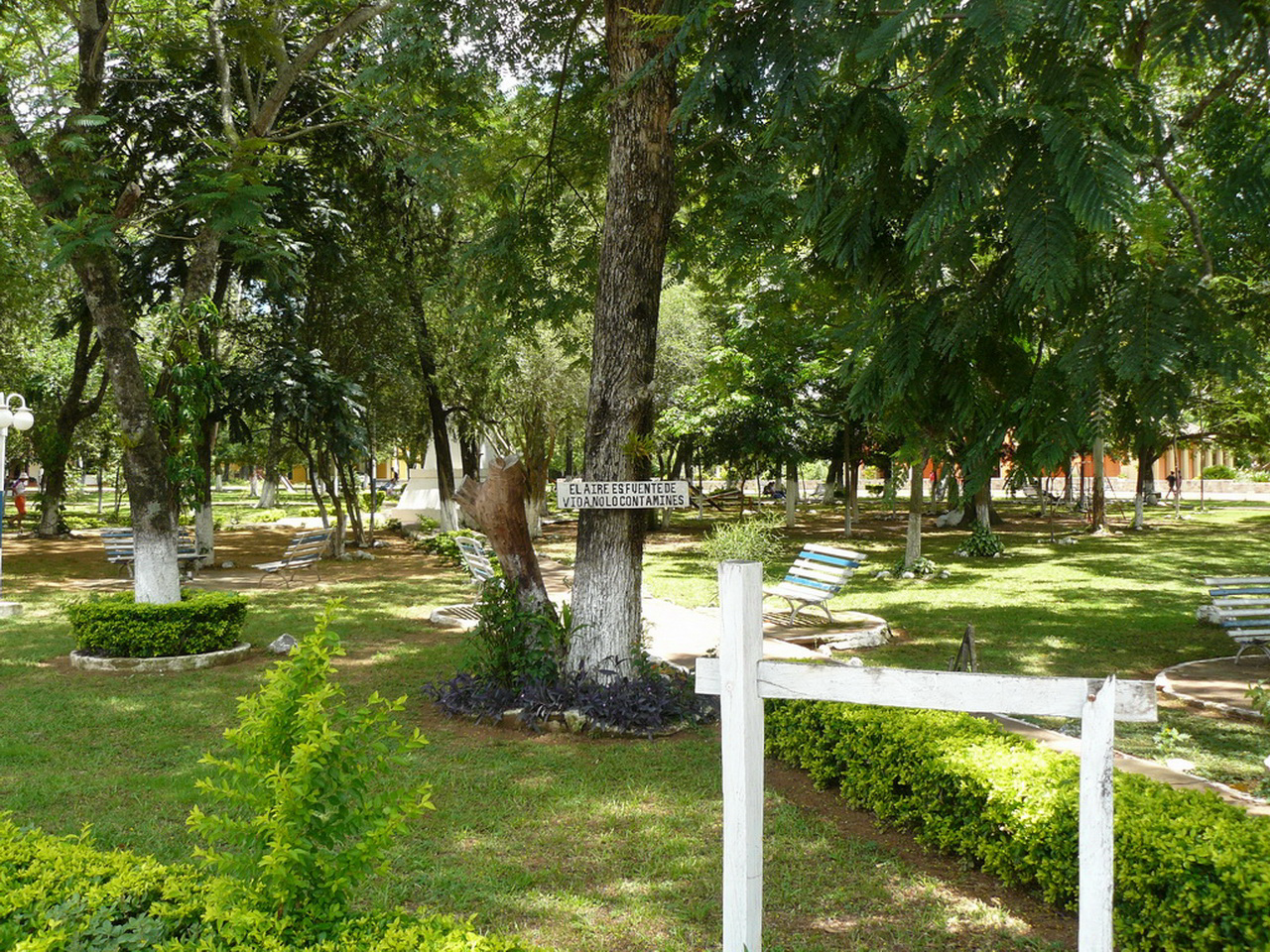
Vegetation in Caapucú's main square.

In the district there is also a lagoon called Laguna Verá.

The main paved road that crosses throughout great part of the district is the Route Mariscal Francisco Solano López, and is the route that connects it with the capital of the country, Asunción, and with other localities of the department.

Other roads are sand and pebbled roads that connect the districts with one another and with the capital of the department. It has telephone service provided by Copaco and mobile phone companies. Additionally, printed periodicals all the districts.

From Asunción, Route No. 1 “Mariscal Francisco Solano López”, until reaching to the capital of Paraguarí, that is about 66 kilometers away, continues by the same route going through the cities Carapegua, San Roque González de Santa Cruz, Quiíndy, until arriving to Caapucú.
