= Aníbal Lovera =

Paraguayan composer (1926–1994)

- Born: Aníbal Lovera; January 26, 1926
- Origin: Paraguari, Paraguay
- Died: January 23, 1994 (aged 67)
- Occupation(s): Composer, singer
- Works: "Recuerdos de ayer", "Paraguarí", "Mi Pobre Vida”

Aníbal Lovera (January 26, 1926 – January 23, 1994) was a Paraguayan composer, singer and folklorist. He was also a singer of the Chaco War epics. Anibal was born in Paraguay, in the Paraguari department, in the city of Quyquyho, on January 26, 1926, and died completely blind in Asunción, January 23, 1994.

== Musical career ==
Throughout his long career as a singer, guitarist, author and composer, he belonged to many different musical groups, and worked together with other talented people. Between 1948 and 1950, he was the lead singer of the Conjunto Folklorico Guarani, directed by Julián Rejala, and sang in duet with Wilma Ferreira. In January 1950, he created his own group. They were presented for the first time at the opening of Radio Guarani, which became a famous radio station in Paraguay. In 1961, he won a national contest in the Popular Music category, and this victory made him even more well known. Between 1970 and 1980 he was often cast on TV shows, such as Asi canta mi Patria, together with friends and members of his group.

Throughout his career, he recorded more than 30 records; most of which were about the battles of the Chaco War. He won a golden disc from RCA International, for his song Dulce Margarita.
