= Roque González =

Roque González may refer to:

- Roque González y de Santa Cruz (1576–1628), Guarani-Spanish Jesuit priest and martyr
- Roque González Garza (1885–1962), Mexican general and politician, acting president in 1915
- Roque González (Argentine politician) (1918–1987), Argentine politician, governor of Chubut (1963–1965)
- Roque González Salazar (1931–2015), Mexican diplomat, ambassador to the Soviet Union (1972–1975)

== See also ==
- Roque Gonzales, Rio Grande do Sul, municipality of Brazil
- San Roque González de Santa Cruz, city in Paraguay
