= Las Mercedes =

Las Mercedes may refer to:

- Las Mercedes (archaeological site, Costa Rica)
- Las Mercedes (Asunción), Paraguay, a neighborhood
- Las Mercedes, Caracas, Venezuela, a shopping district
- Las Mercedes Municipality, Guárico, Venezuela
