= Yaguarón =

- City
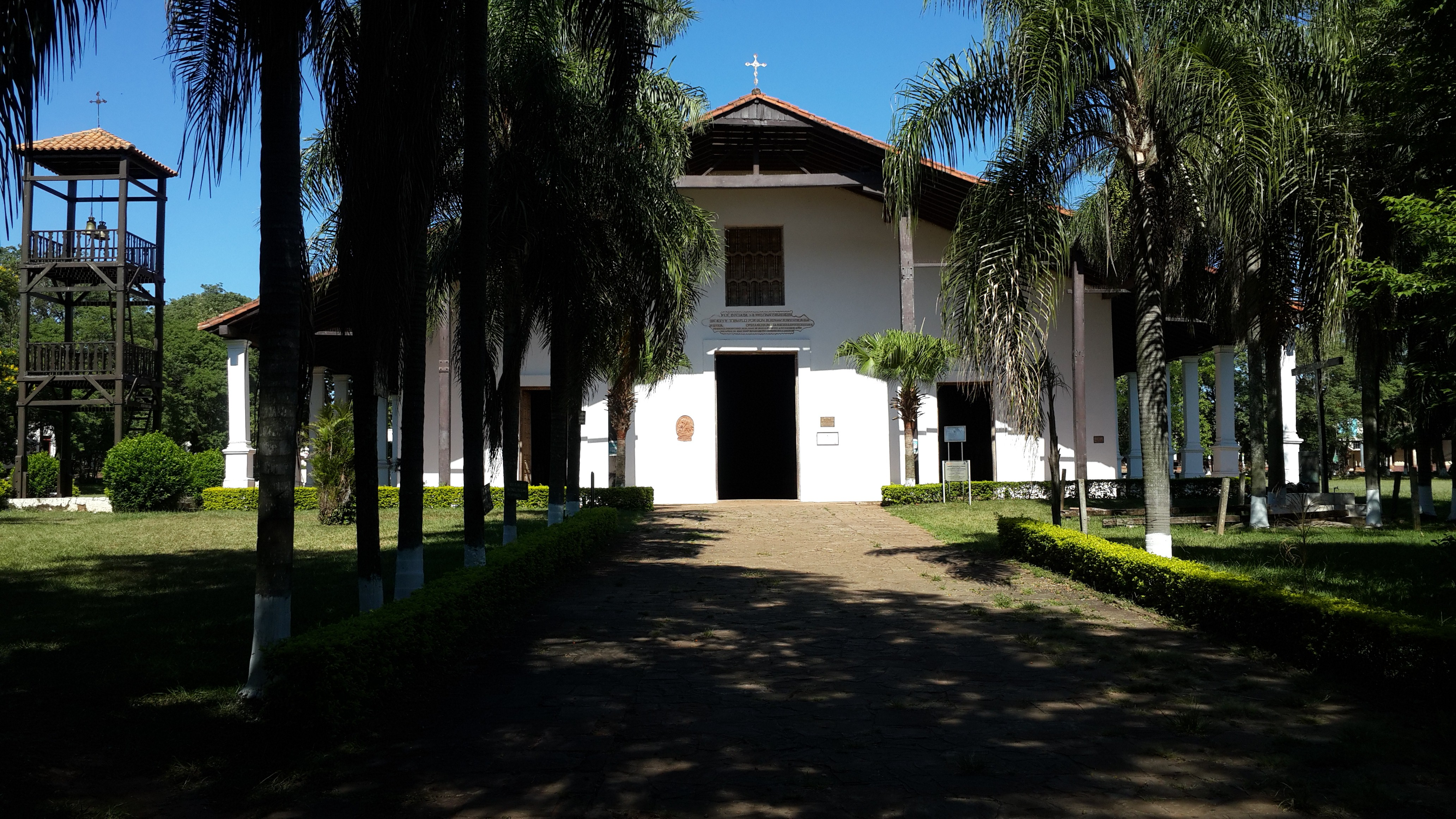
- Yaguarón, Paraguay

- Location within Paraguay
- Coordinates: 25°34′S 57°17′W
- Country: Paraguay
- Department: Paraguarí
- Founded: 1539

Government
  - Intendente Municipal: Cecilio Arzamendia Vera

Area
  - Total: 192 km^{2} (74 sq mi)
- Elevation: 61 m (200 ft)

Population (2008)
  - Total: 27,250
  - Density: 142/km^{2} (370/sq mi)
- Postal code: 4620
- Area code: +595 (533)

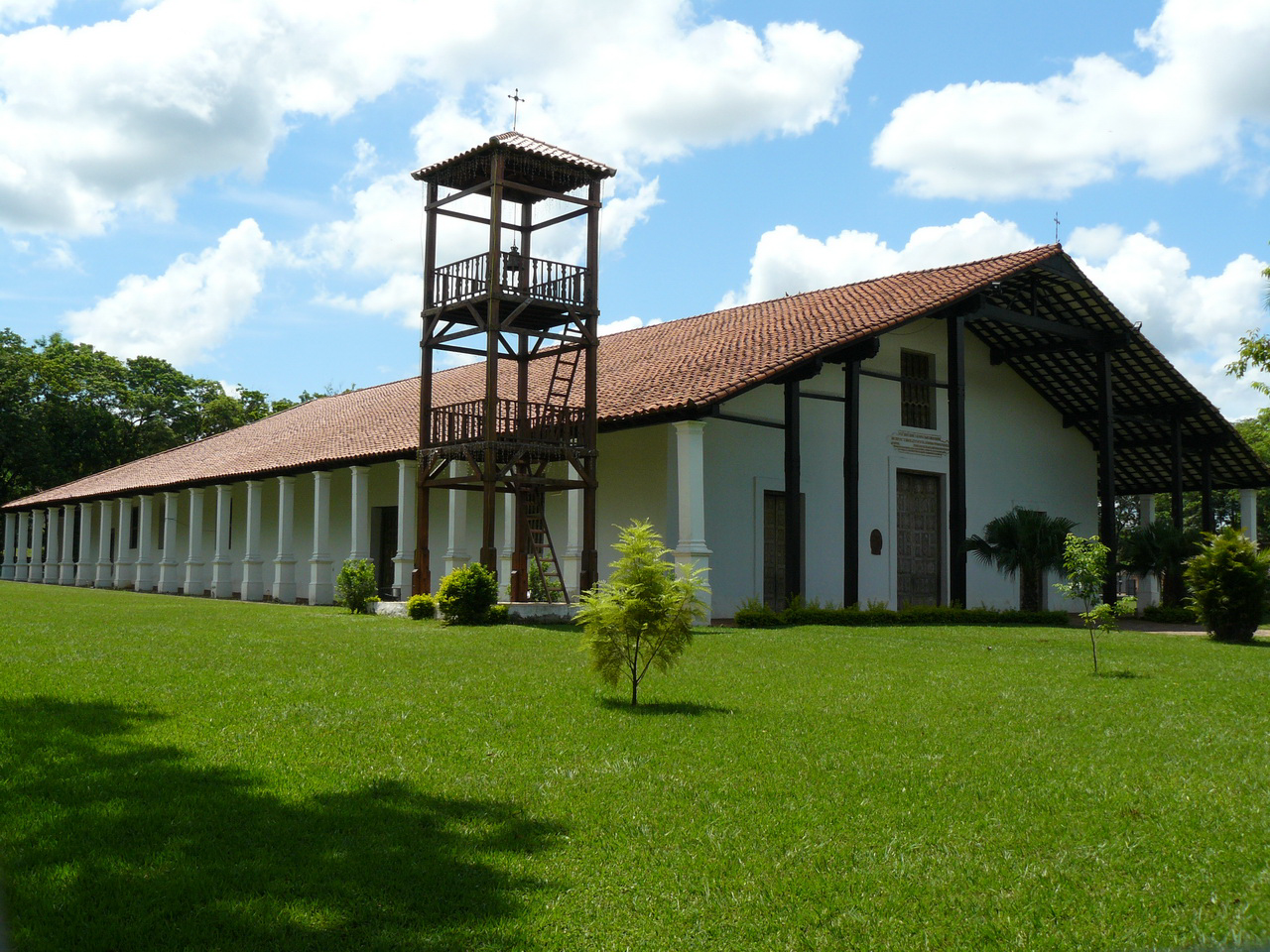
Yaguarón Church and its bell tower.

Yaguarón is a city in Paraguay, located at the base of Yaguarón Hill in the Yaguarón District of Paraguarí Department, 48 kilometres (30 mi) from the capital Asunción. The town began as a Franciscan reservation for the Guaraní Indians.

It contains a famous church, the building of which, led by Fray Alonso de Buenaventura, started in 1640 and took 60 years to complete.

Yaguarón is also notable as the birthplace of José Gaspar Rodríguez de Francia, dictator of Paraguay 1814–1840, whose strong authoritarianism earned him the name El Supremo. His house is now a museum, located only 200 or so meters from the church.

== Toponymy ==
The city was originally called Jaguarú, which in Guaraní mythology means an enormous dog or jaguar that inhabited the region.

== History ==
Located in the foot of a hill with the same name, the city started as a Franciscan Mission to the Guaraní population.

In 1600, Fray Alonso de Buenaventura and his followers built an imposing church that still stands today and is one of the most beautiful examples of Franciscan construction in Paraguay.

The Paraguayan dictator José Gaspar Rodríguez de Francia was born in Yaguarón in 1766.

== Climate ==
The average temperature is 21 °C (70 °F), in summer reaching 39 °C (102 °F) and in winter dropping to 2 °C (36 °F).

== Demographics ==
It has a total of 27,250 inhabitants, 13,965 men and 13,286 women, according to information provided by the Statistics, Polls and Census General Direction.

== Economy ==
The city's economy is based on agriculture and production of clothes and sports gear.

== Transportation ==
Located 48 kilometers from Asunción, the capital of the country, the city is served by Route No. 1 "Mcal. Francisco Solano López".

== Tourism ==
The Gaspar Rodríguez de Francia Museum is located just a block away from the church. It features a variety of Francia's belongings and other objects from the 19th century.

The cavern of Saint Thomas figures into a local legend concerning a priest, Pa'i Sumé, who is said to have left marks during his trip through the region. The road that leads to the cavern was venerated by the natives of the area, who told stories of a blond man that came much before the Spanish arrived and showed them how to cultivate maize.

The altar of the church the Franciscans built in Yaguarón features Hispanic-Guaraní style carvings that the natives made by hand.

From the Gamarra Oratory, on top of the Yaguarón Hill, the cities Pirayú, Itá, Paraguarí and Carapeguá can be seen.

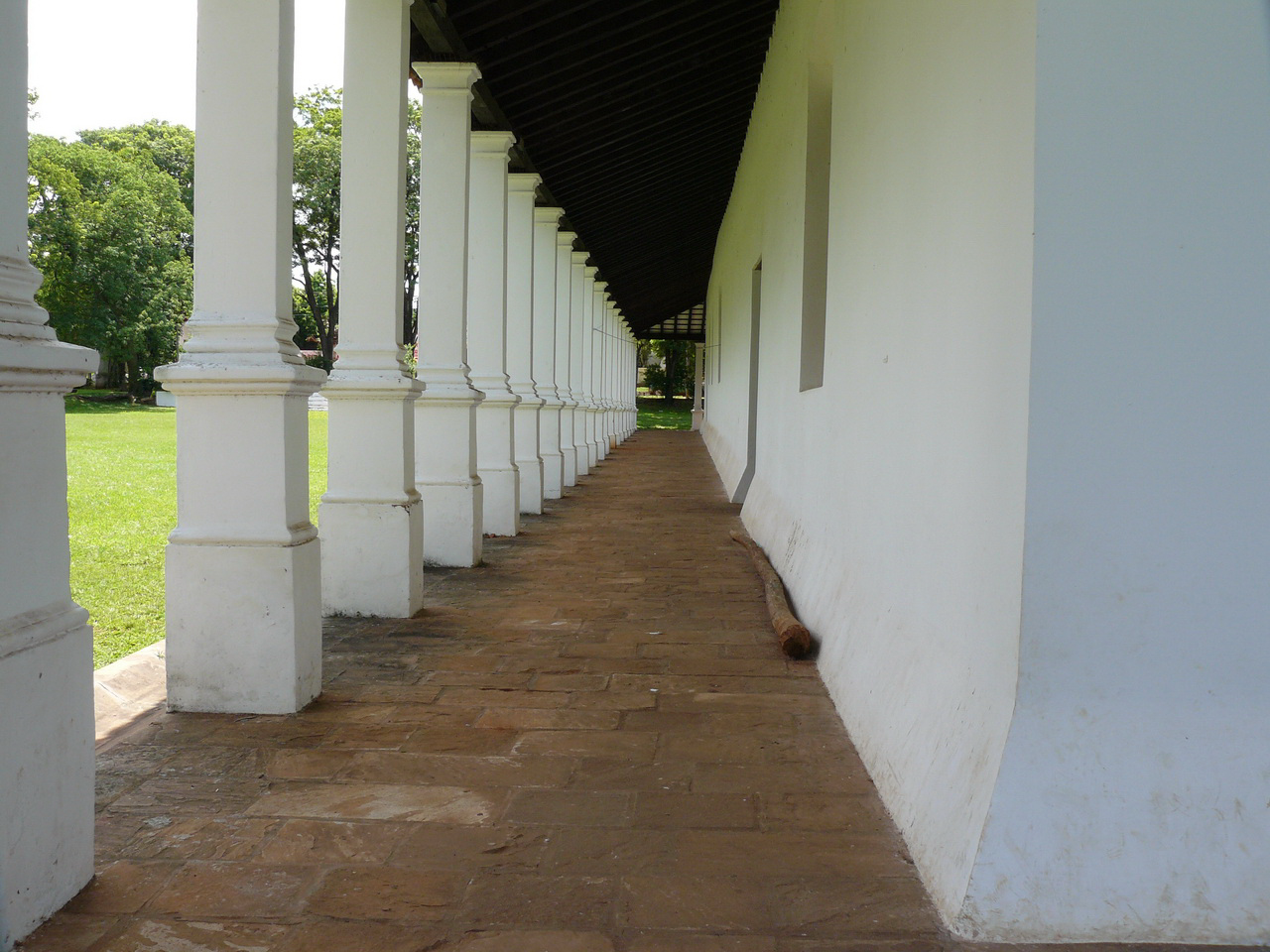
Colonnaded side of Yaguarón Church

The feast of Saint Roque on August 16 is celebrated in a chapel built in his honor. Because it is said that this saint is the protector of dogs, the celebration involves offerings shaped like dogs.

== Musical tradition ==
Yaguarón is home to the "Petete Peteke" Para'i Band, from Guayaibity Town, which uses original, native musical instruments.

In the top of the Yaguarón Hill there is an oratory with a fine view of the local landscape. Legend has it the hill has the footprints of Saint Thomas.

== Sources ==
- World Gazeteer: Paraguay – World-Gazetteer.com
- Geografía Ilustrada del Paraguay, Distribuidora Arami SRL; 2007. ISBN 99925-68-04-6
- Geografía del Paraguay, Primera Edición 1999, Editorial Hispana Paraguay SRL
