= Tiburcio González Rojas =

Paraguayan photographer (1934–2021)

- Born: 12 October 1934; Pirayú, Paraguay
- Died: 23 April 2021 (aged 86)
- Other name: Patrón
- Occupation: photographer
- Spouse: Monica Antonia Centurión
- Children: 2

Tiburcio González Rojas (1934–2021) was a Paraguayan photographer. He became known at the age of 83 when photographs of his that had been saved from a destroyed shed were exhibited in Buenos Aires.

== Early life and career ==
Tiburcio González Rojas was born in Cerro Verá, Pirayú, on 12 October 1934. His first experience as a photographer was at the Jockey Club in Asunción. He later worked as an assistant in the Asunción studio of photographer Ramón Emilio Adorno.

In the 1960s through the 1980s, González Rojas worked as a freelance photographer in various towns and cities in Paraguay, including Pirayú, Ypacaraí, and Yaguarón. He also built his own photography studio which he funded by selling homemade ice-cream.

== Rediscovery ==
In 2010, Argentine photographer Gustavo Di Mario met González Rojas's son while looking for photographers in Ypacaraí. Di Mario was given access to five thousand of González Rojas's undeveloped negatives, which were being stored in a destroyed shed.

Di Mario spent five years restoring the negatives, and in 2017 he and curator Virginia Giannoni displayed a selection of the photographs at an exhibition at the Casa Central de la Cultura Popular in Barracas, Buenos Aires. González Rojas assisted in designing the exhibition, and attended in person. In 2018, the exhibition was shown at the Texo Foundation in Asunción.

== Personal life ==
González Rojas was married to Monica Antonia Centurión, a dentist, with whom he had two children. He died on 23 April 2021 at the age of 86.
