= Yaguarón District =

District

Coordinates: 25°34′S 57°17′W

- District
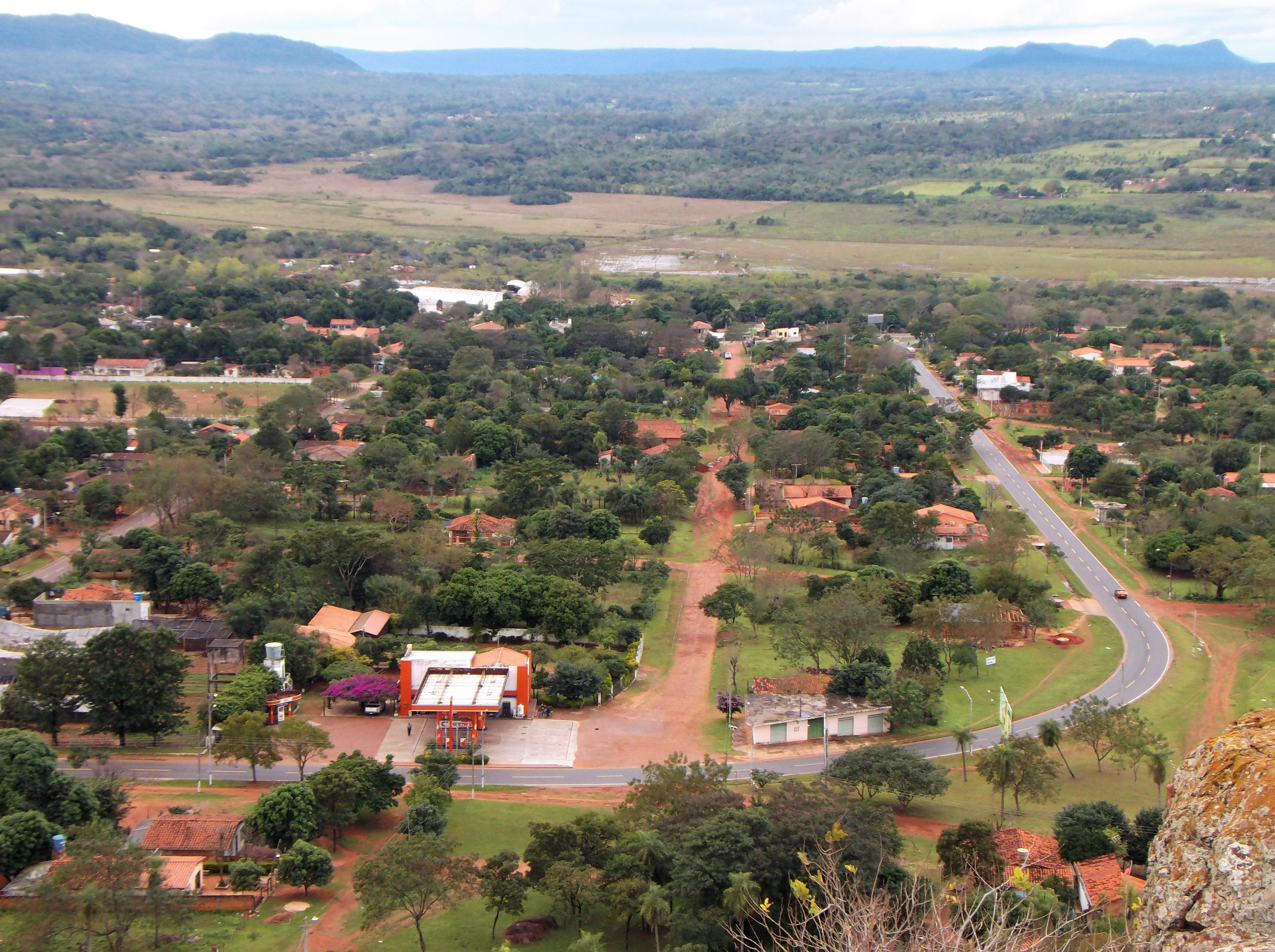
- Interactive map of Yaguarón District
- Country: Paraguay
- Department: Paraguarí

Area
  - Total: 253 km^{2} (98 sq mi)

Population (2022)
  - Total: 29,242
  - Density: 116/km^{2} (299/sq mi)

Yaguarón is a district in Paraguarí Department, Paraguay. It occupies an area of 253 km^{2} (98 sq mi). As per the 2022 census, it had a population of 29,242 individuals.

== History ==
Yaguarón was established as a settlement of indigenous people in 1586. As per writer Narciso Ramón Colmán, Yaguarón was occupied by the Guaraní people, and was founded in 1539 by Domingo Martínez de Irala. As accurate documentation does not exist regarding its creation, the municipal authorities set as a foundational date on 10 October, according to municipal ordinance No. 16/2016. Franciscan missionaries Luis de Bolaños and Alonso de San Buenaventura established a mission that was installed around the Buenaventura temple whose construction had begun in 1755 and culminated in 1772.

== Geography ==
Yaguairón s a district located in the Paraguarí Department in Paraguay. It occupies an area of 253 km^{2} (98 sq mi). In 2020, plans were announced to restore forested areas in Yaguarón.

It is located at an elevation of 88.04 m (288.8 ft) above sea level. The district has a tropical savanna climate (Köppen climate classification: Aw). The average annual temperature is 27.16 °C (80.89 °F). The district receives an average annual rainfall of 15.87 cm (6.25 in) and has 139.37 rainy days in a year.

== Demographics ==
As per the 2022 census, Yaguarón district had a population of 29,242 inhabitants of which 14,657 were males and 14,585 were females. About 64.9% of the population was classified rural, and the rest (35.1%) lived in urban areas. About 25.1% of the population was below the age of fourteen, and 10.5% was more than 65 years of age.

== Culture ==
The Temple of San Buenaventura in Yaguarón is one of Paraguay’s most important historical and cultural monuments, combining Guarani and Franciscan heritage. It was built in the 18th century, and is renowned for its Baroque-Guaraní architecture with ornate wooden carvings, religious sculptures, and gilded altarpieces. Its bell tower served for both religious purposes and as a lookout point during periods of conflict. The church remains a major pilgrimage destination where thousands gather annually for religious celebrations honoring the Virgin of the Assumption. It was declared as a historical heritage monument by Law No. 2206/2003.
