= Caapucú =

Caapucú Ka'apuku
- City
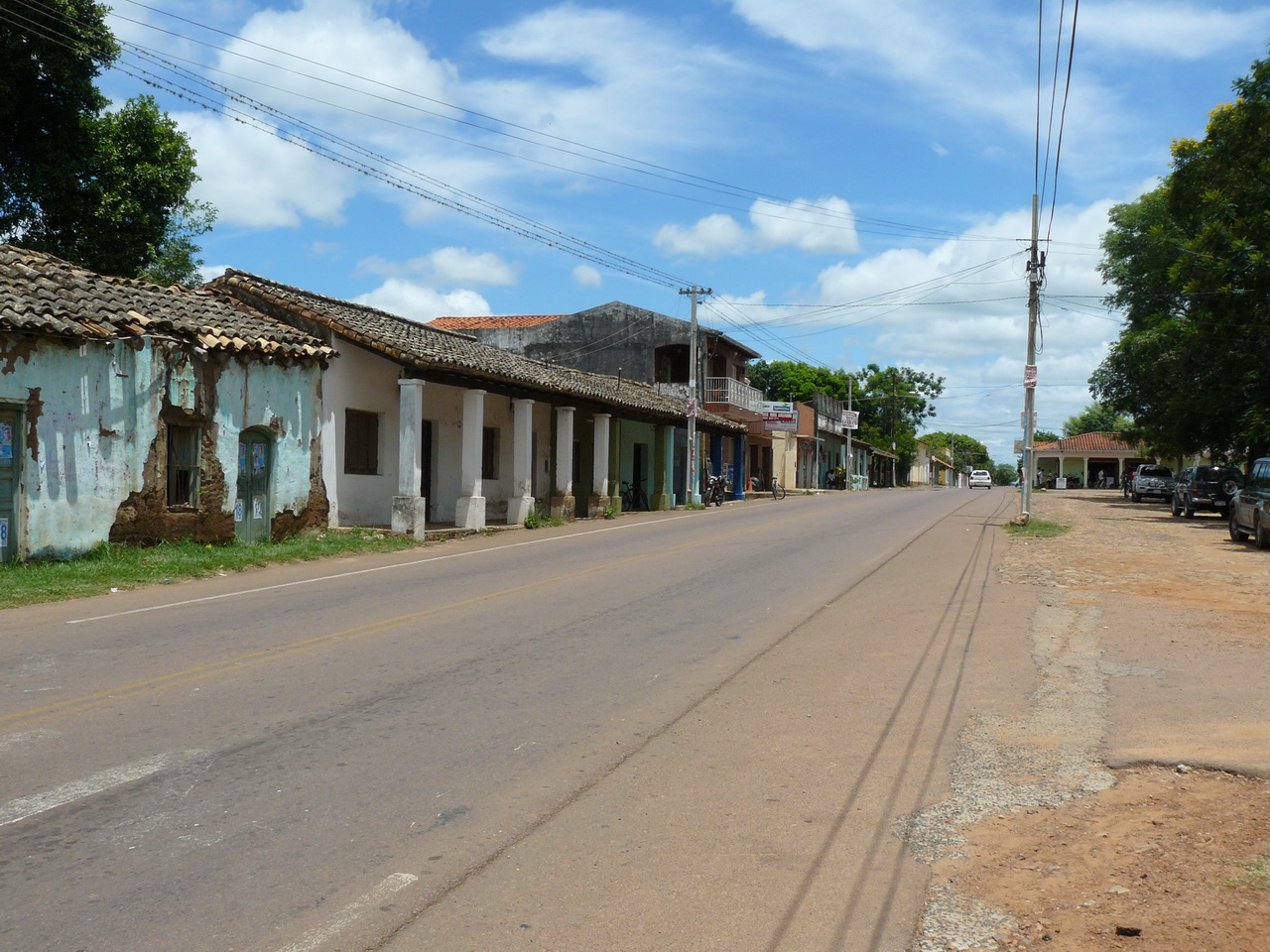

- Location in Paraguay
- Coordinates: 26°14′30″S 57°10′30″W
- Country: Paraguay
- Department: Paraguarí
- Founded: 1787
- Founder: Pedro Melo de Portugal

Government
  - Mayor: Lourdes Sabirna Britez Ugarte

Area
  - Total: 2,455 km^{2} (948 sq mi)
- Elevation: 106 m (348 ft)

Population (2002)
  - Total: 7,249
  - Density: 2.953/km^{2} (7.648/sq mi)
- Postal code: 4300
- Area code: (595)(535)

Caapucú (Guarani: Ka'apuku) is a city in Caapucú District in the Paraguarí Department of Paraguay, At the 2002 census it had a population of 7,249, and is located 141 km from Asunción, the capital of the country.

It was founded in 1787 by Pedro de Melo de Portugal, and was previously known as Capilla Tuvá. The Route No. I crosses through this city.

Caapucú is the biggest district of the department, located in the south region of the latter; it is separated from the Misiones Department by the Tebicuary River.

In the city are many housings from colonial times, most of them built in the time around the Paraguayan Independence. One of them, the Stevant house, resembling a castle, has been turned into a museum that exhibits artifacts from that time.

== Economy ==
The area that borders the Tebicuary River is a land that is victim of flooding, and is a good area for fishing.

Caapucú is an area mostly dedicated to cattle rising of cows, sheep, pigs and horses.

The agriculture activity is orientated mostly to the production for interne consumption of the population; they cultivate sweet cane, grapes, cotton and manioc. Among the main economical activities of the district are the shoe industry, the shops and workshop of craftsmanship, like wood carvings, confection of wardrove in “aó po’I”, “encaje jú” and crafts on leather.

== Municipality ==
Caapucú was founded by Pedro de Melo de Portugal, on August 15, 1787, more to the north of its current location.

The city moved around 1816, during the government of José Gaspar Rodríguez de Francia, due to the shortage of water in the original location.

The current mayor of the district is Lourdes Sanabria Brítez Ugarte, member of the Liberal Party, and she'll be in office for the period of 2006–2010.

The city has seven health care facilities, four sport clubs, four clean-up councils and municipal slaughterhouse.

== Tourism ==
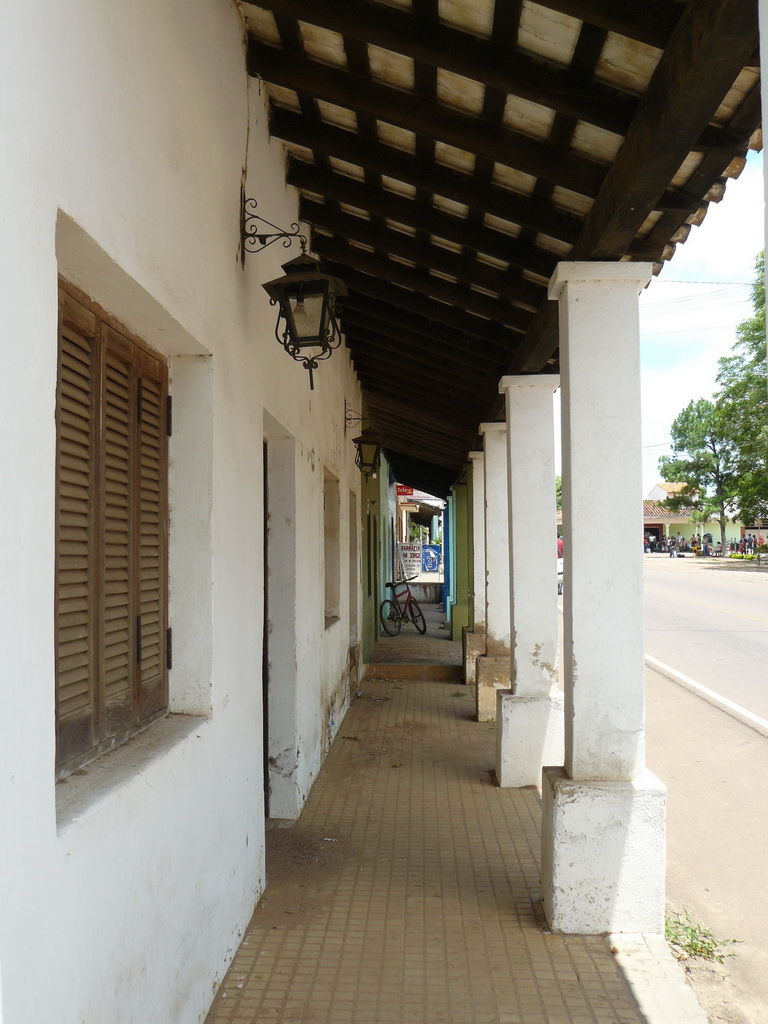
Portico of an old colonial house in Caapucú

Caapucú's touristic spots include the Municipal Square “Punta Arenas” located in the banks of the Tebicuary River, the touristic state “Santa Clara”, located 8 kilometers away from the city and several streams, as well as the area's squares and historical museums.

From Caapucú it's possible to go to other recreational places like Laguna Verá, also called Ypoa-Guazú, where people can go fishing and boating. The place also has a resort near the stream Paso Ybycuí, with installations for camping and sports.

A tour for the hills Charorá, Virgen, Yaguarete-cuá, Tarumá, Mariño, Villalba, Arayhú and Mbocayá allow the visitors to view the natural landscape and lakes.

The main attraction of Caapucú are its beaches of white sand by the Tebicuary River, located in the city of Villa Florida.

The foundation of the city is remembered in the month of August with a party, parades and sport competitions. The folkloric festival “Che Rendá Alazán” is organized every year in the month of February, and the National Festivity of the “Arriero” in October.
