= Bento Martins de Meneses, Baron of Ijuí =

Brazilian soldier (1818–1881)

Baron of Ijuí
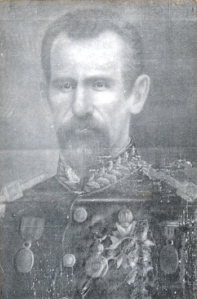
- Born: 7 September 1818; Cachoeira do Sul, Rio Grande do Sul, Brazil
- Died: 27 March 1881 (aged 62); Uruguaiana, Rio Grande do Sul, Brazil
- Military career
- Allegiance: Brazil
- Branch: Imperial Brazilian Army
- Service years: 1835–1881
- Rank: Brigadier General
- Commands: 17th Cavalry Regiment
- Conflicts: Ragamuffin War; Platine War; Paraguayan War; Campaign of the Hills; Battle of Ybytimí; Battle of Miranda

Bento Martins de Meneses, Baron of Ijuí (7 September 1818 – 27 March 1881) was a Brazilian brigadier general who was most notable for his participation of the final battle of the Paraguayan War, the Battle of Miranda.

== Biography ==
Bento was born in Cachoeira on 7 September 1818 to Azorean immigrants Antônio Martins de Meneses and Maria do Carmo Gomes.

He joined the former Brazilian National Guard. He took part in the Ragamuffin War of 1835, serving Bento Manuel. After participating in the conflicts with Uruguay in 1851 and 1852, he was promoted to the rank of lieutenant colonel. He moved to Uruguaiana, where, at the time of the Paraguayan War, he formed the 17th Cavalry Regiment, which faced Antonio de la Cruz Estigarribia's troops and supported the families who took refuge in Alegrete. After the war, he was promoted to brigadier general.

He was given the title of Baron of Ijuí by Imperial Decree of 6 July 1870.

He died in Uruguaiana on 27 March 1881.

The manor where he lived is a tourist spot in Uruguaiana.
