= Escobar, Paraguay =

Gral. Patricio Escobar Escobar
- Location within Paraguay
- Coordinates: 26°1′0″S 57°3′0″W
- Country: Paraguay
- Department: Paraguarí
- Founded: August 30, 1901

Government
  - Intendente municipal: Eduardo Burgos

Area
  - Total: 354 km^{2} (137 sq mi)
- Elevation: 121 m (397 ft)

Population (2008)
  - Total: 8,815
  - Density: 24.9/km^{2} (64.5/sq mi)
- Time zone: -4 Gmt
- Postal code: 4450
- Area code: (595) (531)

Escobar is a town in Paraguarí Department of Paraguay. It is located about 12 km from Paraguarí by Route Villarrica in Paraguarí.

== Etymology ==
The town took this name in honor of President Gral. Patricio Escobar. He was one of the heroes of the Paraguayan War and president of Paraguay in the late 19th century.

Before its founding by decree, was called "Yukeri."

== Weather ==
The average temperature is 21 °C, the highest in 39 the summer and the lowest in winter, 2.

== Demography ==
Escobar has a total of 8,815 inhabitants, of which 4,645 males and 4,170 females, according to estimates by the Directorate General of Statistics, Census and Surveys.

== Economy ==
Mainly dedicated to agriculture: cotton, corn, bean, manioc, sugarcane, and sweet potato.

Another economic activity is also cattle rising.

== Colleges ==
- Elementary School No. 669 "Lic. Rosa Marin de Gamarra"
- School "Emancipación Nacional"

== Transportation ==
Escobar is located 78 km from Asunción and 12 km Paraguarí, a branch of Route I Mariscal Francisco Solano López because this can also lead to diversion Sapucaí and Caballero.

== Tourism ==
It has a Health Centre, Police and Post Office. Several rural areas are part of District Escobar: Arroyo Pora, Chircal, Guazú-Cua, Mbocayaty, General Aquino.

It includes an area of pools, the spa Itá Coty. The spa offers a stream from the hills and is surrounded by abundant vegetation and stones. Visitors can go camping, and there are canteens and sports fields in the area.

It has a centuries-old train station. On October 1 patronal feast of Santa Teresa del Niño Jesús is made a procession through the main streets of the town, with caravan riders and the patron saints of the various chapels of companies Escobar.

== Notable people ==
- Emigdio Ayala Báez, composer and musician, author of "Mi dicha lejana" and "A mi pueblito Escobar."
