= Battle of Miranda =

- Part of the Paraguayan War
Date	4–8 April 1870
Location	Miranda Military Colony, Mato Grosso do Sul, Brazil
Result	Brazilian victory: End of the war

Belligerents
Empire of Brazil	Paraguay

Commanders and leaders
Baron of Ijuí; Chicuta	B. Caballero (surrendered)

Strength
Unknown	Around 100 Infantry

Casualties and losses
Unknown	40 killed, 54 captured

The Battle of Miranda was the final battle of the Paraguayan War between Brazilian and Paraguayan soldiers from 4 to 8 April 1870 before the final organized Paraguayan force surrendered.

== Background ==
Before the Battle of Cerro Corá on 1 March 1870, Solano López had ordered General Bernardino Caballero to look for cattle and horses in the Military Colony of Dourados, in Brazilian territory. The Paraguayan general and about 100 soldiers crossed the Paraguayan-Brazilian border across the Apa River on 12 February. The news of Solano López's defeat did not reach General Caballero, and he continued the search for provisions throughout March. During the Battle at Cerro Corá, a force detached from the column of General José Antônio Correia da Câmara, under the command of Bento Martins de Meneses, was assigned to close the siege of López on the Apa River, to prevent the Paraguayan president from escaping there.

== The battle ==
With López's death, the war was officially declared over. However, Colonel Martins' Brazilian forces turned against the Paraguayans who were in Brazilian territory. Bernardino Caballero was close to the Military Colony of Miranda on a farm known as Cândido Oliveira. On 4 April 1870, Brazilian troops found them there and launched an attack, defeating them and some remaining fleeing the battlefield. In the rush to flee, General Bernardino Caballero lost his sword as Colonel Martins' forces went after the Paraguayans. A division of these forces, under the leadership of Major Francisco Marques Xavier, encountered General Caballero and 54 remaining of his column near the village of Bela Vista on the 8th. Brazilian troops were preparing to attack when the Paraguayan general decided to surrender after being convinced of the death of Marshal Solano López. These were the last Paraguayans to surrender.
