= Quiíndy =

Quiíndy Ky'ỹindy
- District and city
- Location within Paraguay
- Coordinates: 25.973°S 57.237°W
- Country: Paraguay
- Department: Paraguarí
- Founded: 1733

Government
  - Intendente Municipal: María Gloria Caballero

Area
  - Total: 885 km^{2} (342 sq mi)

Population (2008)
  - Total: 16,074
  - Density: 46/km^{2} (120/sq mi)
- Time zone: -4 Gmt
- Postal code: 4240
- Area code: (595) (536)

Quiíndy (Guarani: Ky'ỹindy) is a city and district in the Paraguarí Department of Paraguay, 103 kilometers from Asunción.

The city is located on Route 1 "Mariscal Francisco Solano López". The city is bordered by several crystalline streams, including the Tobatingua and the Yacareby.

Near the city is the well-known Ypoá lake, a natural reserve highly rich in fauna and flora, one of the most important of the country.

== Area ==
This district has an area of 885 square kilometers, a total population of 19,643 inhabitants and a population density of 22.70 inhabitants per square kilometer.

== Economy ==
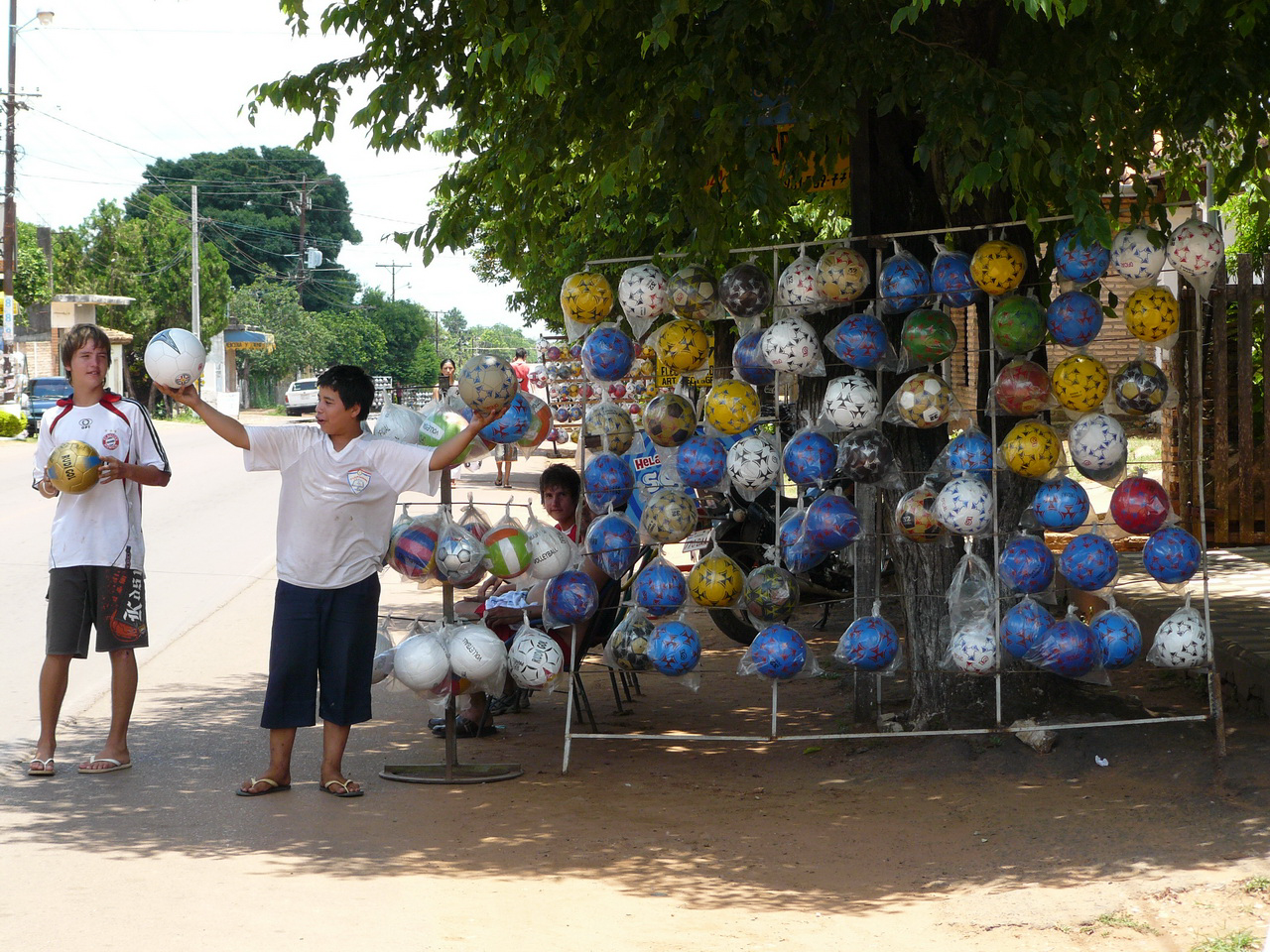
Balls

His population dedicates the most to the cattle and agricultural production, outstanding in the cultivation of sugar-cane that makes it famous for its Paraguayan "caña". Also has cultivation of grapes, cotton, manioc, also works in stock-breeding of cows, sheep, pigs and horses.

Quiíndy is known for the manufacture of balls. The inhabitants dedicates to the manufacture of leather balls, one of the most important economic activities of the district.

== Roads and Communication ==
The Route 1 "Mariscal Francisco Solano López" is the main asphalted road that crosses all of the Paraguarí Department and connects Asunción with the district and other locations of the department.

The other roads are terraced and join the districts between them and with the capital of the department.

Has the telephonic services from Copaco and mobile telephony, besides various communication media and the journals from the capital of the country.

== How to get there ==
Starting from Asunción, following the Route 1 "Mariscal Francisco Solano López" until get to the capital of the Paraguarí Department, travelers keep following the road passing through the districts of Carapeguá, San Roque González de Santa Cruz, finally getting to Quiíndy.

== Geography ==
This district is located in the middle of the Paraguarí Department.

In this district are also located:

- Cerro Ita Ybaté.
- Cerro Pytá.
- Cerro Santo Tomás.
- Cerro Trinchera Cué.

=== Limits ===
- North: The San Roque González de Santa Cruz district.
- South: The Caapucú district.
- East: The Ybycuí district.
- West: The Ypoá lake and the National Park, also the Central Department and the Ñeembucú Department.

=== Hydrography ===
Many streams flows through this district, among them the Ñandupay, the Zanja Jú, the Tobatinguá, the Yacarey, the Tacuary, the Itary, the Mbusyi and the Mbói Kuatiá.

In the zone of the Ypoá lake and the Parana-mí lake are many estuaries such as the Ypoá estuary.

== Demography ==
According to the General Office of Statistics, Polls and Census, Quiíndy has a total population of 19,643 inhabitants (10,233 males and 9,410 females), from which the 74.66% of the population is settled on the rural zone. From the total of occupied houses, 51.46% correspond to the rural sector.

The main social-demographic indicators says:

- Population under 15 years old: 34.5%.
- Average of kids per woman: 3.1 kids.
- Average of illiterates: 8.6%
- Population occupied in the primary sector: 45.1%
- Population occupied in the secondary sector: 17,8%
- Population occupied in the tertiary sector: 35.6%
- Percentage of houses with electricity service: 83.9%
- Percentage of houses with water service: 40.0%

Population with unsatisfied basic needs in:

- Education: 6.9%.
- Sanitary infrastructure: 18.0%.
- Housing quality: 30.1%.

== Tourism ==
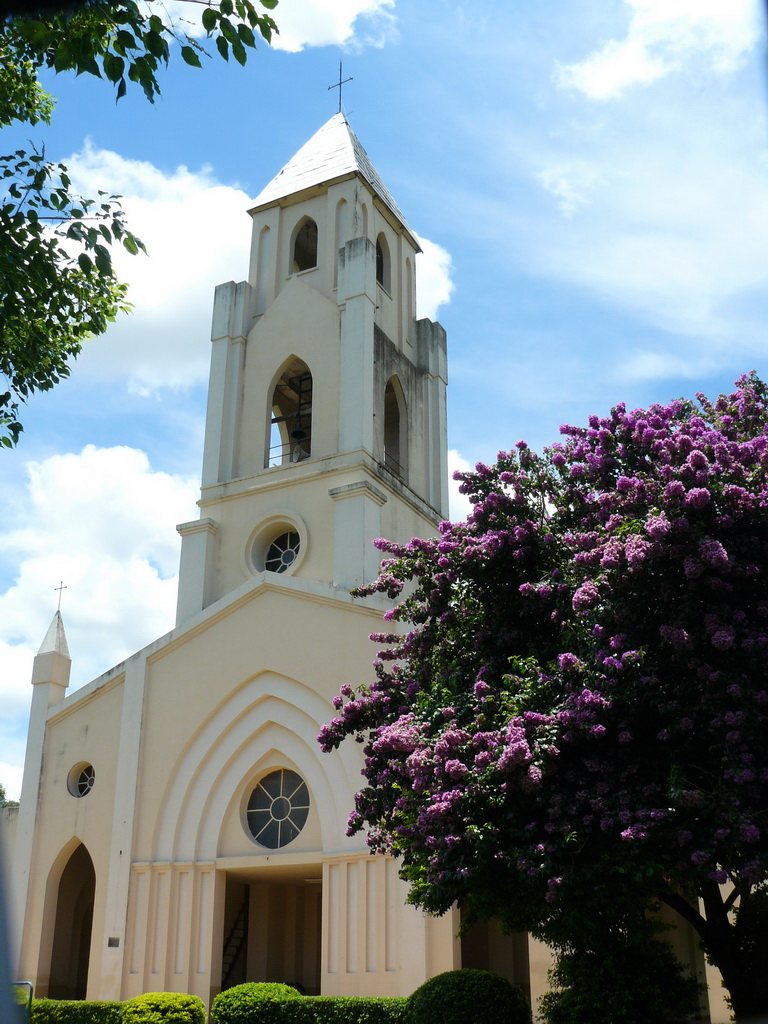
Church

As adventure and ecological tourism can be mentioned the Ypoá lake and the National Park, places ready to the deployment of safaris and walks, and with beaches.

The Paraná-mí lake has crystalline waters and beaches.

An ancient church, built in the time of the Franciscan Reductions in the 16th Century, is located in the area.
