= Toronto School of Art =

Art school in Toronto, Canada

The Toronto School of Art is an independent registered charity, non-profit, art school in Toronto teaching painting, drawing, ceramics, sculpture, collage, fibre arts, photography, and digital arts.

After fifty years of operating out of rental facilities, the school acquired ownership of a building at 24 Ryerson Avenue in Downtown Toronto. The building in the Queen/Bathurst area was extensively renovated and has been the home of TSA since 2019.

The school was founded in 1969 as Art School Toronto and continues to pride itself as being operated "by artists, for artists.". All of TSA's instructors are professional artists and educators.

TSA no longer offers degree programs or diplomas. The courses offered at Toronto School of Art include professional instruction in drawing, painting, figurative studies, collage, ceramics, sculpture, printmaking, professional development, portfolio development, digital and fibre arts. The focus is adult education with youth programs offered on Saturdays and over the summer months.

The school went bankrupt in 2012 and faced closure, but was able to reopen, restructure, and eventually buy its own facilities due to the support of benefactors. In 2019, enrollment surpassed 1,500 students, up from 500 in 2012.
