= Escobar Inc =

Puerto Rican company

- Type: Private
- Founded: May 1, 1984 (unofficially); April 20, 2015 (registered)
- Founders: Olof K Gustafsson
- Defunct: December 2023
- Area served: Worldwide
- Key people: Olof Gustafsson (CEO)
- Website: escobarinc.com

Escobar Inc is a company registered in Guaynabo, Puerto Rico, tied to various scams involving selling smartphones and flamethrowers with Escobar Inc branding without delivering the products to customers. It was established on April 20, 2015. The company is known for its association with Roberto de Jesús Escobar Gaviria, the brother of Pablo Escobar, and various scams.

== History ==
The company was formed into a legal corporation on April 20, 2015, in Puerto Rico.

=== Conflict with Netflix ===
On July 1, 2016, Escobar Inc sent a letter to Netflix, Inc. regarding the series Narcos demanding $1 billion in payment for unauthorized usage of content. On September 11, 2017, Carlos Muñoz Portal, a location scout from Netflix, was found assassinated in his car in Mexico. Roberto Escobar denied any involvement and offered to provide hitmen as security for Netflix. Escobar Inc later abandoned the dispute.

=== Donald Trump ===
On January 8, 2019, Pablo Escobar's brother Robert Escobar, launched a $50 million GoFundMe fundraiser on behalf of Escobar Inc in an effort to impeach President Trump. The page was promptly removed from the platform.

=== Elon Musk and The Boring Company ===
In July 2019, Escobar Inc started selling a propane torch made to look like a flamethrower and accused The Boring Company CEO Elon Musk of intellectual property theft, alleging that The Boring Company's promotional Not-a-Flamethrower is based on a design that Roberto Escobar discussed in 2017 with an engineer associated with Musk. Through the media, Escobar Inc publicly offered Musk a settlement of $100 million in cash or Tesla shares; otherwise they would use the legal system to take over Tesla. No action has been taken since. Customers who paid for the Escobar Inc flamethrower reportedly received a printed certificate of ownership instead of the ordered product. Buyers had disputes filed with PayPal denied after Escobar Inc provided the tracking information used to send the certificate as proof of delivery. PayPal later closed its accounts with Escobar Inc.

=== PabloEscobar.com ===
On August 28, 2019, Escobar Inc filed a UDRP complaint regarding cybersquatting of the domain PabloEscobar.com with the then-National Arbitration Forum. The prior owner demanded $3 million for the domain name and on October 7, 2019, the case was ruled in the favor of the company with the domain name ordered to be transferred to the company.

=== Arrest of CEO ===
On December 4, 2023, the CEO of Escobar Inc, Olof Kyros Gustafsson, 30, was arrested in Marbella, Spain, on charges including money laundering, fraud, and art smuggling. The American authorities sought his extradition to the United States, as confirmed by his lawyer. Gustafsson is alleged to have been involved in a criminal organization engaged in the illegal trade of artwork.

Gustafsson and Escobar Inc also face accusations of defrauding 500–600 customers by not delivering mobile phones they had paid for, which the company attributes to delivery issues during the pandemic. The firm has been embroiled in legal conflicts with payment service providers Klarna and Stripe, leading to the closure of its accounts. The money laundering allegations involve the transfer of $1.2 million between accounts in the US and the UAE.

Gustafsson was extradited from Madrid, Spain to Los Angeles on March 28, 2025, and arraigned on the same day on a 115-count federal indictment alleging he licensed the rights of the late Colombian narcoterrorist Pablo Escobar and defrauded investors by marketing and selling products – including flamethrowers and cellphones – that he never delivered. Gustafsson was charged with one count of conspiracy to commit wire fraud and mail fraud, nine counts of wire fraud, three counts of mail fraud, one count of conspiracy to engage in money laundering, 41 counts of money laundering, 35 counts of international money laundering, and 25 counts of engaging in monetary transactions in property derived from specified unlawful activity. Gustafsson is being detained at FCI Oakdale II with prisoner number 69611-511 and is set to be released in April 2027.

=== Pablo Escobar trademark ===
In September 2021, Escobar Inc applied for a European Union trademark for the name "Pablo Escobar". The European Union Intellectual Property Office (EUIPO) rejected the application on the grounds that it "was contrary to public policy and to accepted principles of morality". The company challenged the EUIPO decision but, on 17 April 2024, the General Court of the EU upheld the decision to reject the trademark citing that the name "Pablo Escobar" is associated with "drug trafficking and narco-terrorism and with the crimes and suffering resulting therefrom" and thus the trademark would be against "fundamental values and moral standards".

== Smartphones ==
On December 2, 2019, Escobar Inc released what it called the Escobar Fold 1 smartphone featuring a flexible screen, which ended up being a rebadged Royole FlexPai. Two months later, on February 10, 2020, the Escobar Fold 2 was released, which is a Galaxy Fold with poorly added Escobar branding. Many customers, when ordering the phones, said that they never received them, with only tech influencers actually receiving products. It has also been alleged that Escobar Inc sent bogus product orders consisting of a book, allowing Escobar Inc to claim the phone had been shipped out. In May 2020, the company released a refurbished version of the iPhone 11 Pro and allegedly sued Apple for $2.6 billion.
