= Alonso de San Buenaventura =

Spanish Franciscan friar and missionary evangelist

Alonso de San Buenaventura (died December 6, 1597, in San Francisco del Monte, Chile) was a Spanish Franciscan friar and missionary evangelist. He entered the Franciscan order at the convent of Our Lady of Loreto in Espartinas, Seville. After being ordained priest, he enlisted a group of Franciscans for missionary work in Paraguay. Among these was the deacon Luis de Bolaños, later the initiator of the system of Indian reductions.

The party embarked in 1572 with the expedition led by the Adelantado Juan Ortiz de Zárate, which arrived in Asunción (the capital of present-day Paraguay) in 1575. For many years the Franciscans worked there, spreading the Gospel and doctrine, and founding missions and reductions among the Guaraní tribes.

San Buenaventura returned to Spain to recruit more missionaries in 1585. He stopped in Lima (present-day Peru) for two years to teach novices, and came back to Paraguay in 1588–1589 with a new group of Franciscans. He repeated the round trip to Spain and back in 1592–1593, this time bringing 24 more missionaries, including Martín Ignacio de Loyola, who was then bishop of the Río de la Plata diocese. They arrived in Panama and went through Peru and south. In Santiago, Chile, San Buenaventura fell ill, and died at the convent of San Francisco del Monte.
