= Paraguarí Department =

Department of Paraguay

Paraguarí Departamento de Paraguarí (Spanish) Tetãvore Paraguari (Guarani)
- Department
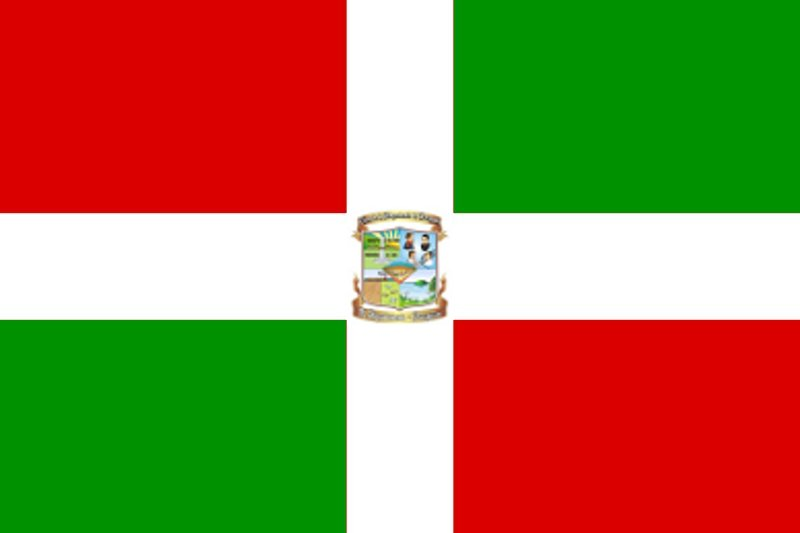
- Flag

- Coordinates: 25°38′S 57°9′W
- Country: Paraguay
- Capital: Paraguarí

Government
  - Governor: Norma Zárate de Monges (ANR)

Area
  - Total: 8,705 km^{2} (3,361 sq mi)

Population (2022 census)
  - Total: 200,472
  - Density: 23.03/km^{2} (59.65/sq mi)
- Time zone: UTC-04 (AST)
  - Summer (DST): UTC-03 (ADT)
- ISO 3166 code: PY-9
- Number of Districts: 17

Paraguarí (Spanish pronunciation: [pa.ɾa.ɣwaˈɾi]; Guaraní: Paraguari) is a department in Paraguay. At the 2002 census it had a population of 221,932. The capital is the city of Paraguarí.

== Districts ==
The department is divided into 17 districts:

1. Acahay
2. Caapucú
3. Carapeguá
4. Escobar
5. General Bernardino Caballero
6. La Colmena
7. Mbuyapey
8. Paraguarí
9. Pirayú
10. Quiíndy
11. Quyquyhó
12. San Roque González de Santa Cruz
13. Sapucaí
14. Tebicuary-mí
15. Yaguarón
16. Ybycuí
17. Ybytimí
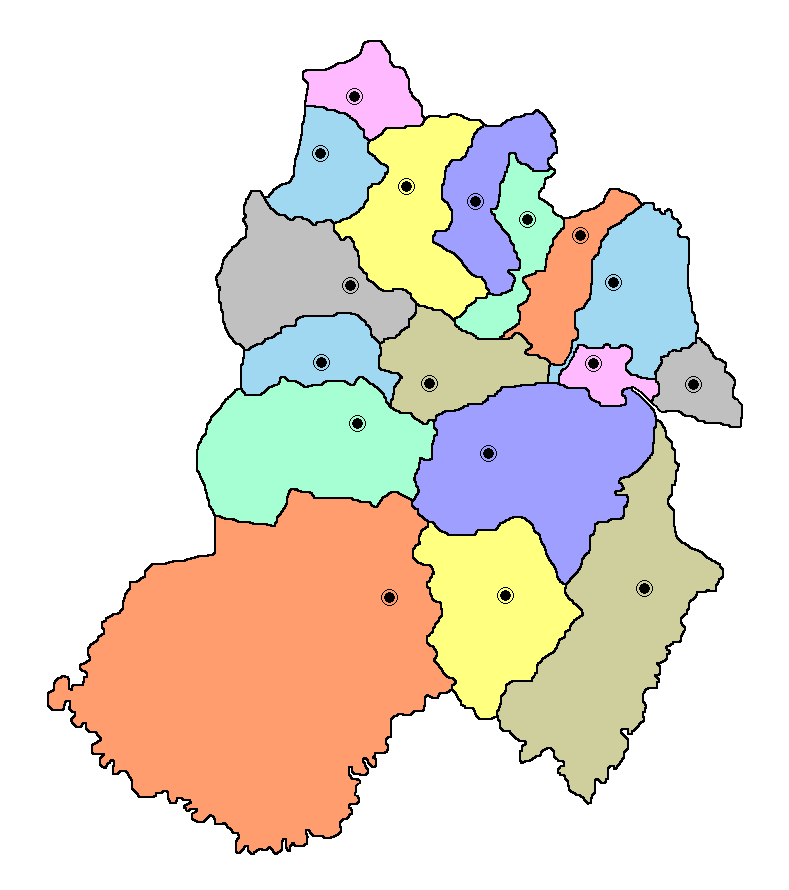

== See also ==
- List of high schools in Paraguarí
