= Tebicuary-mí =

Tebicuarymí Tevikuarymi
- Location within Paraguay
- Coordinates: 25°54′56″S 56°40′27″W
- Country: Paraguay
- Department: Paraguarí

Population (2008)
  - Total: 493

Tebicuary-mí (Guarani: Tevikuarymi) is a district in the Paraguarí department of Paraguay.

== Sources ==
- World Gazeteer: Paraguay – World-Gazetteer.com
