= Las Mercedes (Asunción) =

Coordinates: 25°17′8.17″S 57°36′44.9″W

- Barrio
- Interactive map of Las Mercedes
- Country: Paraguay
- Autonomous Capital District: Gran Asunción
- City: Asunción

Population
  - Total: 4,827

Las Mercedes is a neighbourhood (barrio) of Asunción, Paraguay.
