= Pirayú =

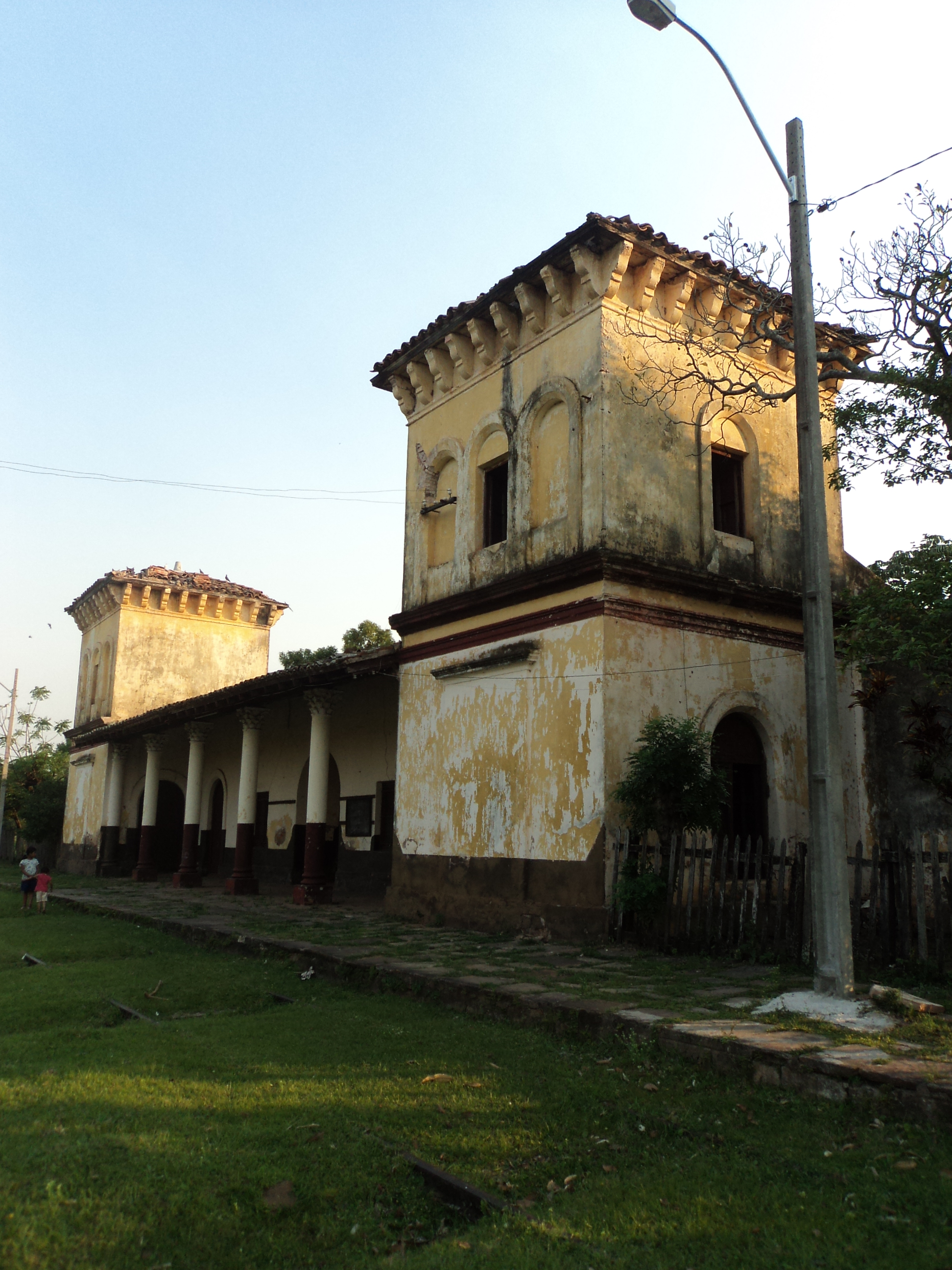
- Old train station, built circa 1860

- Location within Paraguay
- Coordinates: 25°28′48″S 57°13′48″W
- Country: Paraguay
- Department: Paraguarí
- Founded: 15 October 1769
- Founder: Carlos Morphi

Government
  - Intendente municipal: Guido Ramón Gayoso

Area
  - Total: 141 km^{2} (54 sq mi)

Population (2016)
  - Total: 17,601
  - Density: 125.72/km^{2} (325.6/sq mi)
- Time zone: UTC-4
  - Summer (DST): UTC-3

Pirayú is a town in the Paraguarí department of Paraguay. It is 50km from Asunción, in the vicinity of the Cordillera de los Altos.

== History ==
Pirayú; formerly called Gayoso Chapel. Its original name stems from a land donation from the Gayoso feudatory family, a descendant of the local encomendero, to the local Franciscan order.

The town nucleated from a small chapel around which a modest neighbourhood developed into a rural parish. In 1767 a Franciscan Temple was erected - although the site's choir loft dates the church as early as 1561 (or possibly 1567).

After the end of the Great War, geopolitical rearrangements created a new district of the area, making the town a dependent of the department of Paraguarí.

Its current jurisdiction includes, in the downtown area, four Barrios named No. 1 to 4, as well as twelve Companies: Paso Esperanza, Tuyucuá, Taba i, Potrero Avendaño, Costa Hũ, Cerro Verá, Azcurra, Ykuá Kaũ, Arroyo Servin, Yaguarón Yurú, Cerro León and Ka'aguy Potî.

The urban area consists of residential housing, a railway station built in 1864, and more modern structures. The rural area includes ranches and is crossed by natural streams.

== Geography ==
The district of Pirayú is situated at the northern end of the Department of Paraguarí, in which the topography is rugged, comprising hills belonging to the Highlands range. Included among the elevations of the region are the hills Yvytypané, Mbatoví and Santo Tomás. It has an area of 141 km2 of territorial extent.

It is boundaried on the north by the Cordillera Department; to the west the Central Department; to the south with Yaguarón and Paraguarí; and to the east with the Cordillera Department. The waters of the following streams irrigate the district of Pirayú: Pirayú (main tributary), Peña, Poti'y, Madame Linch, Ramírez and Zorrilla.

== Economy ==
The main activities of the district include the Artisan production in typical fabrics such as Ñandutí, hammocks and shoe creation, agricultural production, and livestock work. Agricultural productivity is directed towards the cultivation of sweet cane, cassava and seasonal fruits. Its livestock includes mainly the breeding of cattle. Additionally, the region has numerous quarries, from which brick, clay, and kaolin are extracted.

== Infrastructure ==
The main transport routes by land are Route PY01 and Route PY02. Throughout the district, the telephone services of the state company COPACO and mobile telephony are available. Diverse media such as public passenger transport, local frequency modulated radios, and cable television stations also operate.

The city is accessed by a branch of road that is part of Route PY01 at km 48 of the center of Yaguarón and, separately, by Route PY02 at km 36 in the city of Ypacarai. The roads connect with the capital of the country, Asunción, and with other localities of the district.

== Notable people ==
- Juan Andrés Gelly, diplomat
- Tiburcio González Rojas, photographer

== Sources ==
- World Gazeteer: Paraguay – World-Gazetteer.com
