= Ybytimí =

Ybytimí Ybytimi
- Location within Paraguay
- Coordinates: 25°46′12″S 56°47′24″W
- Country: Paraguay
- Department: Paraguarí

Population (2008)
  - Total: 534

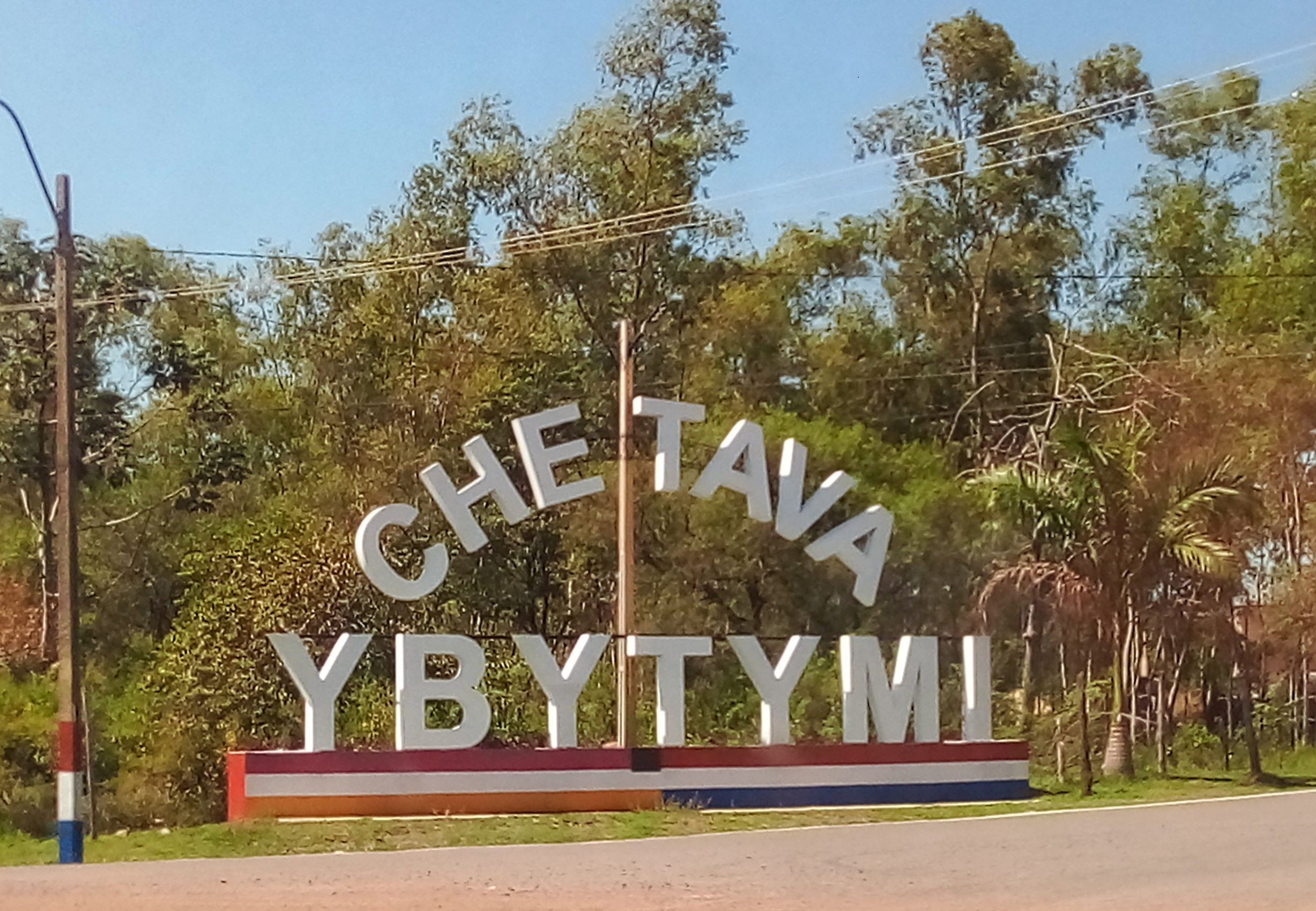
Sign outside of Ybytymí

Ybytimí (Guarani: Ybytimi) is a village in the Paraguarí department of Paraguay.

== See also ==
- Battle of Ybytimí

== Sources ==
- World Gazeteer: Paraguay – World-Gazetteer.com
