= San Roque González de Santa Cruz =

- Coordinates: 25.883°S 57.283°W
- Country: Paraguay
- Department: Paraguarí
- Founded: 1538
- Founded by: Domingo Martínez de Irala

Government
  - Intendente Municipal: Del Pilar Cerafín Montiel Serna

Area
  - Total: 293 km^{2} (113 sq mi)

Population
  - Total: 11.648 (2,008)
  - Density: 40/km^{2} (100/sq mi)
- Area code: (595)(535)

San Roque González de Santa Cruz is a distrito in the Paraguarí Department of Paraguay, it is located 97 km from Asunción, the capital of the country.

The National Route 1, crosses through this city.
