= Carapeguá =

Carapeguá Karapegua
- City and district
- Location within Paraguay
- Coordinates: 25°46′8.32″S 57°14′49.23″W
- Country: Paraguay
- Department: Paraguarí
- Founded: May 14, 1725
- Founder: Martín de Barúa

Government
  - Intendente Municipal: Isabelino Silva

Area
  - Total: 435 km^{2} (168 sq mi)

Population
  - Total: 32,939
  - Density: 76/km^{2} (200/sq mi)
- Postal code: 4240
- Area code: (595) (532)

Carapeguá (Spanish pronunciation: [kaɾapeˈɣwa]; Guarani: Karapegua) is a city and district of the Paraguarí Department, Paraguay, located 84 km from Asunción. It was founded in 1725.

Settled by the Caañabé river and over the Route 1 "Mariscal Francisco Solano López", the Carapeguá district is located near the legendary Ypoá lake.

It is also known as the "Caañabé's Pearl".

== Area ==
This district has an area of 435 square kilometers, populated by approximately 32,939 inhabitants and with a population density of 75,72 inhabitants per square kilometer.

== Economy ==
Carapeguá is known as the capital of the poyvi (Guaraní for "thread") because of its fine artisan production in threaded objects such as blankets, ponchos, sheets, hammocks. and others. They are made with a technique popularly called poyvi in which old looms are used.

The inhabitants are dedicated to agricultural and cattle activities, and also to the cultivation of sugar-cane. In cattle production, they stock-breed cows, sheep and horses. In agricultural production they cultivate sugar cane, corn, cotton, and manioc.

There exists a sugar mill and factories of sausages and tanning.

== Roads and Communication ==
The main asphalted road is the Route 1 "Mariscal Francisco Solano López", that connects the district with Asunción and other locations of the department and the country.

== Population ==
Carapeguá is the most populated district of the Paraguarí Department. It has a total population of 32,939 inhabitants, being 16,903 males and 16,036 females.

== Geography ==
=== Limits ===
- North: The Central Department and the Yaguarón district.
- South: The San Roque González de Santa Cruz district.
- East: The Paraguarí and Acahay districts.
- West: The Central Department.

=== Hydrography ===
Through this district flows the streams Caañabé and Aguai'hy-mí. In the western side of this district is the Ypoa estuary.

== Demography ==
82.09% of the population is settled on the rural zone. 82.78% of the total houses correspond to the rural sector.

The main social-demographic indicators in the district says:

- Population under 15 years old: 31%
- Average of kids per woman: 2.7 kids
- Percentage of illiterates: 6.4%
- Population occupied in the primary sector: 32.8%
- Population occupied in the secondary sector: 32.1%.
- Population occupied in the tertiary sector: 34.5%
- Population occupied in agricultural works: 32.7%
- Percentage of houses with electricity service: 91.1%.
- Percentage of houses with water service: 57.2%.

Population with unsatisfied basic needs in:

- Education: 5.7%
- Sanitary infrastructure: 17.2%
- Housing quality: 27.9%

== Tourism ==
In this district could be visited the House of the Culture and the Historical Artisan Museum of the Oñondivepá Cultural Center, that shows diverse samples of the history, art and culture of the region. The cathedral and the bishopric see also deserve a visit.

There are many commerce where could be acquired the products made of poyvi, like sheets, hammocks, blankets and ponchos.

By the Caapucumí company you can get to Mosito Isle navigating in cachiveos (canoes made of timbó trunks) to visit the paradisiac isle of 35 hectares in the middle of the Ypoá estuary.
