= Sapucaí =

Sapucaí Sapukai
- Location within Paraguay
- Coordinates: 25°40′03.92″S 56°57′20.02″W
- Country: Paraguay
- Department: Paraguarí
- Elevation: 167 m (548 ft)

Population (2008)
  - Total: 2 146

Sapucaí (Guarani: Sapukai) is a town in the Paraguarí department of Paraguay.

== Sources ==
- World Gazeteer: Paraguay – World-Gazetteer.com
- Hansard– Mention of Sapucai steam locomotive workshop in UK's Parliament
- YouTube – Video of Sapucai steam locomotive workshop
