= Acahay =

- Location within Paraguay
- Coordinates: 25°54′36″S 57°6′36″W
- Country: Paraguay
- Department: Paraguarí
- Elevation: 167 m (548 ft)

Population (2017)
  - Total: 16,264

Acahay is a town and district in the Paraguarí department of Paraguay. At the 2017 census it had a population of 16,264.

== Sources ==
- World Gazetteer: Paraguay – World-Gazetteer.com
