= Paraguarí =

- City
- Paraguarí
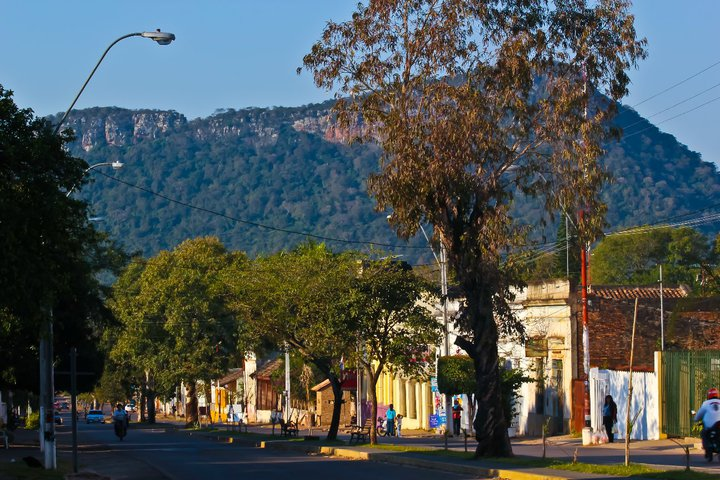
- a street in Paraguarí

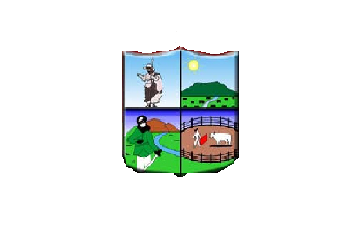
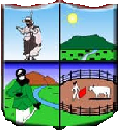
- Flag Coat of arms

- Location within Paraguay
- Coordinates: 25°38′0″S 57°9′0″W
- Country: Paraguay
- Department: Paraguarí
- District: Paraguarí
- Founded: August 18, 1775
- Founder: Agustín Fernando de Pinedo

Government
  - Intendente Municipal: Juan Carlos Baruja Fernandez

Area
  - Total: 273 km^{2} (105 sq mi)
- Elevation: 87 m (285 ft)

Population (2002)
  - Total: 22,154
  - Density: 81.2/km^{2} (210/sq mi)
- Time zone: UTC-04 (AST)
  - Summer (DST): UTC-03 (ADT)
- Postal code: 4000
- Area code: (595) (531)

Paraguarí (Spanish pronunciation: [paɾaɣwaˈɾi]; Guarani: Paraguari) is a city, district, and capital of Paraguarí Department in Paraguay. It is located 66 km from the country's capital, Asunción. According to the census in 2002, it had a population of 22,154.

== Toponymy ==
Paraguarí is called “The cradle of the National Independence." In that city on January 13, 1811, the Paraguayans Yegros, Gamarra, and Cabañas, with their troops, defeated the Argentine Army, commanded by General Manuel Belgrano in the Battle of Cerro Mbaé or Battle of Paraguarí.

It was founded in 1775 over a hill by Agustín Fernando de Pinedo, a time after the banishment of the Jesuits in Paraguay. On August 18, 1960, the town became a district.

== Geography ==
The city of Paraguarí is situated 66 km from Asunción, bordering to the north with the Altos Cordillera and to the south with a wide savanna.

It's surrounded by the hills Saint Thomas, Cerro Peró (Bald Hill), and Cerro Porteño.

=== Limits ===
- To the north: City of Pirayú.
- To the east: Escobar.
- To the south: Sapucaí, Acahay, and Carapeguá.
- To the west: Yaguarón.

=== Weather ===
The average temperature is 21 degrees Celsius, the maximum in summer is 39 degrees Celsius, and the minimum in winter is 2 degrees Celsius.

Climate data for Paraguarí (1991–2020)
Month	Jan	Feb	Mar	Apr	May	Jun	Jul	Aug	Sep	Oct	Nov	Dec	Year
Mean daily maximum °C (°F)	33.3 (91.9)	32.5 (90.5)	31.3 (88.3)	28.6 (83.5)	24.5 (76.1)	23.1 (73.6)	23.1 (73.6)	25.7 (78.3)	27.3 (81.1)	29.3 (84.7)	30.8 (87.4)	32.5 (90.5)	28.5 (83.3)
Daily mean °C (°F)	27.6 (81.7)	26.8 (80.2)	25.6 (78.1)	22.9 (73.2)	19.3 (66.7)	18.0 (64.4)	17.3 (63.1)	19.3 (66.7)	21.2 (70.2)	23.6 (74.5)	24.8 (76.6)	26.7 (80.1)	22.8 (73.0)
Mean daily minimum °C (°F)	22.5 (72.5)	22.0 (71.6)	20.6 (69.1)	18.1 (64.6)	14.7 (58.5)	13.4 (56.1)	12.3 (54.1)	13.7 (56.7)	15.7 (60.3)	18.6 (65.5)	19.4 (66.9)	21.4 (70.5)	17.7 (63.9)
Average precipitation mm (inches)	146.5 (5.77)	131.5 (5.18)	143.9 (5.67)	157.1 (6.19)	150.5 (5.93)	86.3 (3.40)	61.9 (2.44)	51.2 (2.02)	96.9 (3.81)	195.5 (7.70)	196.3 (7.73)	179.5 (7.07)	1,597.2 (62.88)
Source: NOAA

== Demographics ==
According to the 2002 census, Paraguarí has 22,154 inhabitants, of which 11,053 are men and 11,101 women, according to the 2002 census. In the urban area there are 8,307 inhabitants, and in the rural area there are 13,847.

== Economy ==
The expansion of the agriculture and livestock industry of the region and an important road network make Paraguarí the main supplier of Asunción.

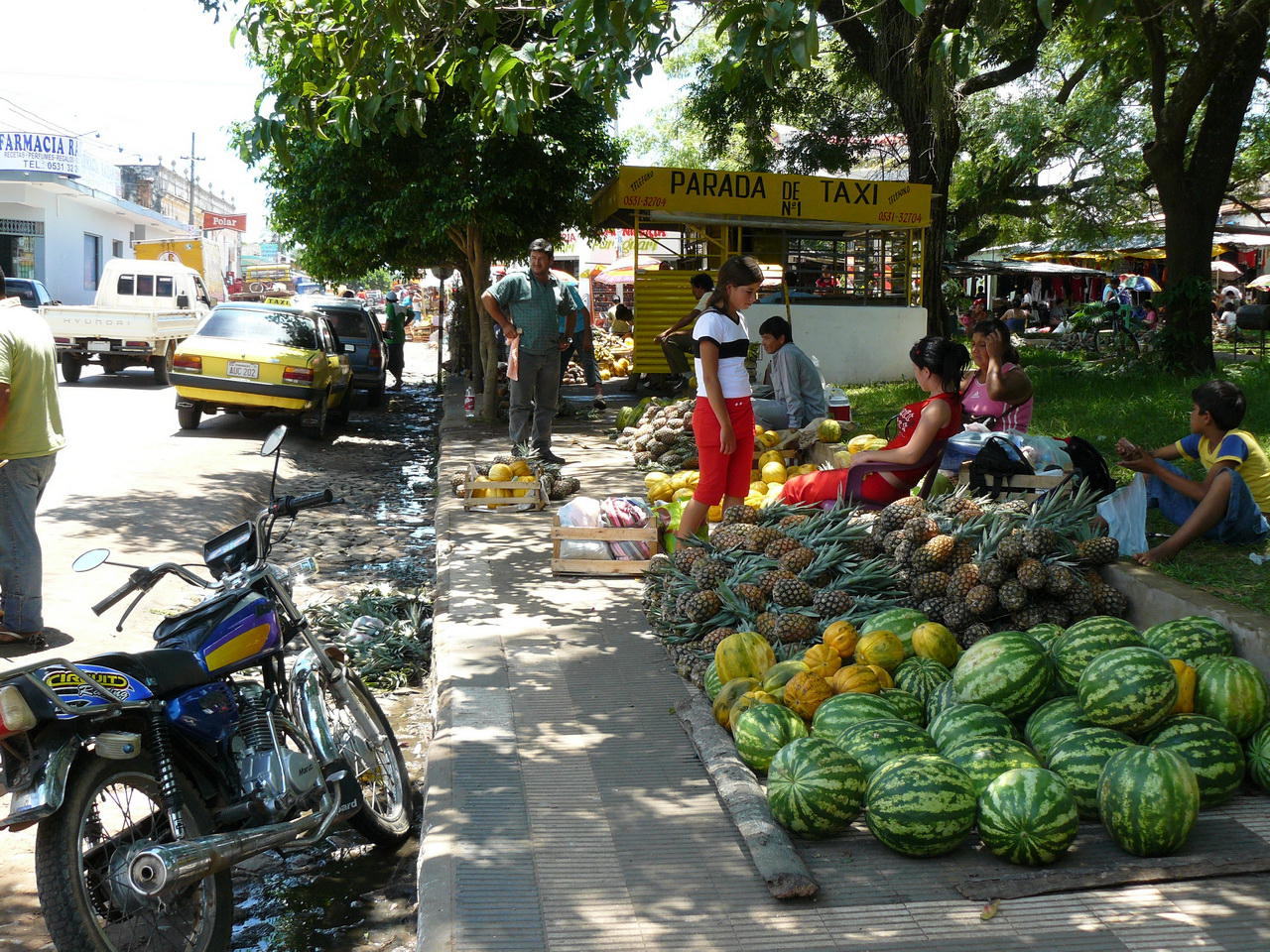
Mercado de Paraguari

It's a commercial center for the agricultural products of its inhabitants. It is also an important learning center in the region.

There exist quarries where granite and kaolin are extracted.

== Transportation ==
Paraguarí is 66 km away from Asunción, following the Route 1 “Mariscal Francisco Solano López." To get to Paraguarí, one can take an inter-urban bus at the Bus Terminal of Asunción, or at the Eusebio Ayala Road, where a bus leaves for Paraguarí about every 15 minutes.

Coming from the east following Route 2, you must take the Rogelio Benítez Road (7th km) after crossing the detour to Eusebio Ayala.

== History ==
Paraguarí was founded by Agustín Fernando de Pinedo, ordered by Charles the Third, King of Spain, after the banishment of the Jesuits in Paraguay, where he overtook their properties: The ranches “Tavapy” and “Campo Grande”.

Many Spanish people moved to Paraguarí, coming from Burgos and Andalucía.

The Company of Jesus in the 7th century was established in Paraguarí, in a great ranch until the banishment of the King Charles III.

== Tourism ==
Paraguarí has a number of attractions of interest to tourists. It has several picturesque districts, including the famous fruit stores of Paraguarí, which are closely packed together and located to the side of Route 1. There's also Kamba Kokué, an old neighbourhood whose name testifies to the existence of black slaves in the Missiones. The train station of the city is one of the oldest in America, and the city's old church draws many visitors. The National Museum of Artillery is also located in the city and forms the seat of the Army's Artillery Command, displaying cannons, antique weapons, trophies, photographs, and documents.

Annual bullfights, known as “toro moñaroha” in the Guaraní language, are held along with the city's celebrations honoring Saint Thomas' Day. The whole city participates in the event, making it an unmissable event.

Looking just beyond the city itself, the road between Paraguarí and Piribebuy connects several tourist locations across a landscape of hills and brooks only a few miles away from Asunción. One of them is the Mbatovi reservation, located 72 km away from Asunción, following the road that connects Routes 1 and 2, the roadhouses of Chololó, Pinamar, Piraretá, and others.
