= Posadas-Encarnación International Train =

Railway service between Argentina and Paraguay

Posadas–Encarnación International Train
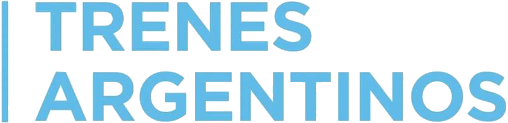

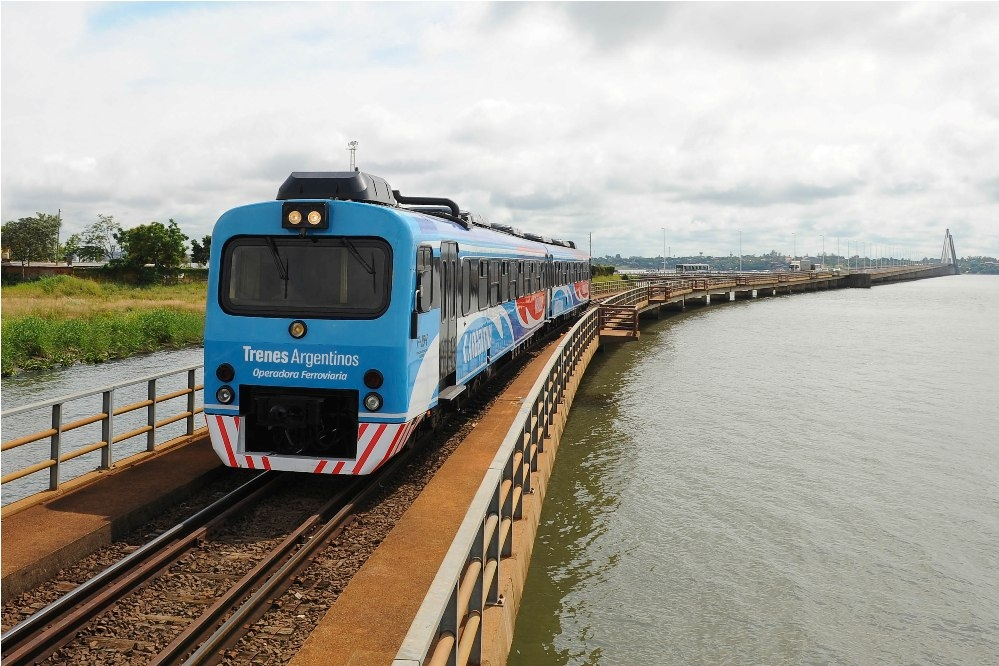
- Train running San Roque bridge in 2015

Overview
- Service type: Commuter rail
- Status: Active
- Locale: Misiones Province; Itapúa Department
- First service: 2014; 12 years ago
- Current operator: Casimiro Zbikoski
- Former operator: Ferrocarriles Argentinos
- Ridership: 11,000 per day

Route
- Termini: Apeadero Posadas; Encarnación
- Stops: 2
- Distance travelled: 8 km (5.0 mi)
- Average journey time: 10 minutes
- Service frequency: 30 minutes
- Line used: Urquiza

Technical
- Track gauge: 1,435 mm (4 ft 8 1/2 in) standard gauge
- Electrification: none
- Track owner: Government of Argentina

The Posadas–Encarnación International Train is a 8 km (5.0 mi) commuter rail international service operated between Posadas in Argentina and Encarnación in Paraguay, running on the Urquiza Railway standard gauge tracks. The service was opened in January 2014. Trains run from Monday till Saturday every 30 minutes with the first train departing at 7:15 am in Posadas and the last one leaving Encarnacion at 6:30 pm.

== Overview ==
Trains are run by private company Casimiro Zbikoski S.A. under an operation agreement with State-owned Operadora Ferroviaria Sociedad del Estado (SOFSE). The train crosses the San Roque González de Santa Cruz Bridge which joins the two countries together and has an average journey time of 10 minutes with a 30-minute frequency.

Apeadero Posadas (above) and Encarnación, the only two stations of the line

The current rolling stock consists of two-carriage diesel-hydraulic railcars originally called "Wadloper", built between 1981 and 1983 by German company Duewag for the Dutch railway company Nederlandse Spoorwegen, and have a capacity to carry 250 people. Those railcars had been previously used in the binational service Tren de los Pueblos Libres that joined Argentina and Uruguay, having been active only for one year.

With passenger numbers increasing rapidly after the opening of the service, the Argentine Ministry of the Interior and Transport stated in March 2015 that it may have to evaluate adding more rolling stock and extending the length of the platforms.

In August 2015, the service was suspended for an unspecified period of time, with no reasons given from either concessionaire Casimiro Zbikoski or Trenes Argentinos. At the time of the service being suspended, the train had carried 250,000 people within the year. On the other hand, the Government of Paraguay stated that they had no objections to anything related to the service, blaming the Argentine authorities for the suspension of the train. Other versions affirmed that the service could be reestablished the second week in September. On 7 September, service resumed as normal, though the three-week interruption had not been explained.

== See also ==
- General Urquiza Railway
- Rail transport in Argentina
- Rail transport in Paraguay
