= San Roque González de Santa Cruz Bridge =

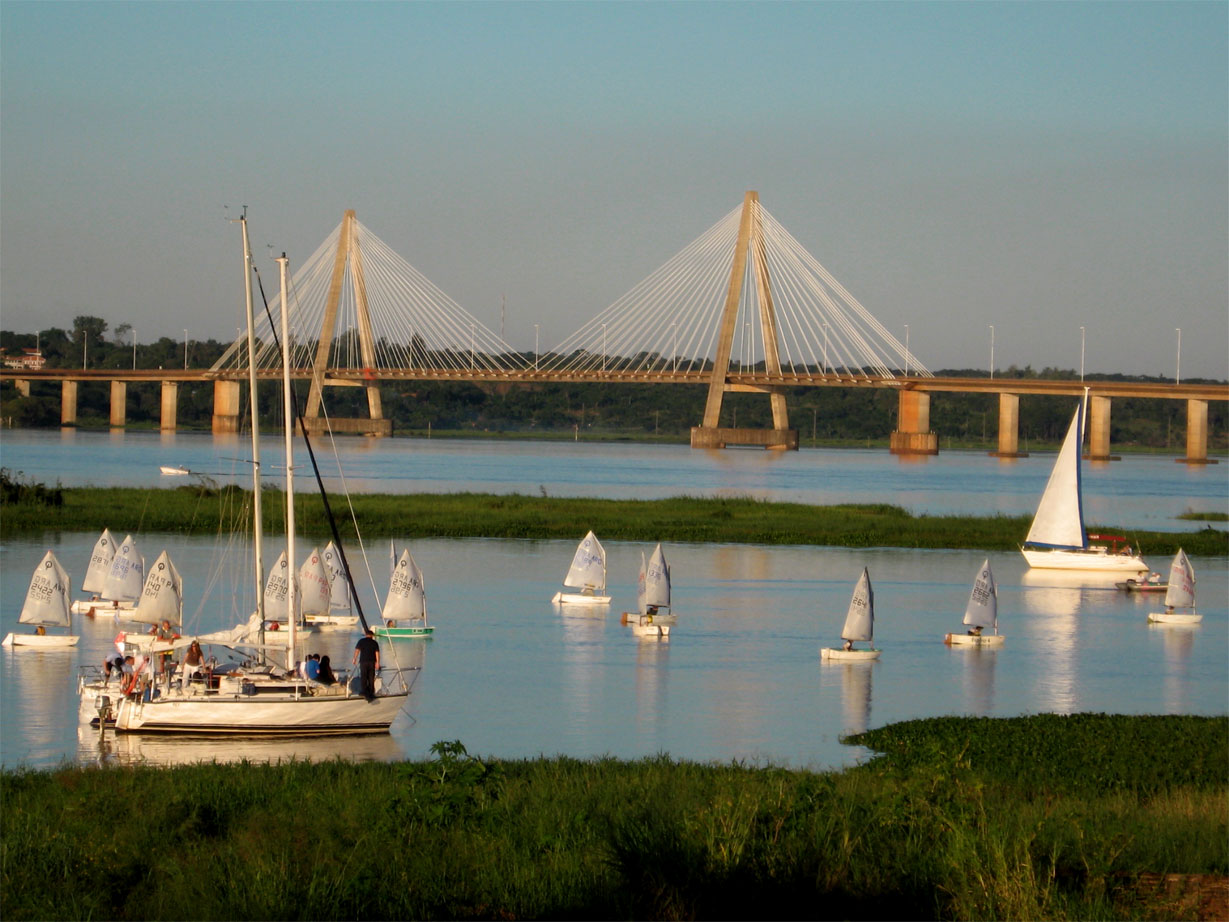
- Coordinates: 27.373139°S 55.871916°W
- Crosses: Paraná River
- Locale: Posadas, Misiones, Argentina. Encarnación, Itapúa, Paraguay
- Preceded by: Friendship Bridge
- Followed by: Yacyretá Dam

Characteristics
- Design: Cable-stayed bridge
- Total length: 2,550 metres (8,366 ft)
- Width: 18 metres (59 ft)
- Longest span: 330 metres (1,083 ft)

History
- Construction start: 1983
- Opened: April 2, 1990

Location
- Interactive map of San Roque González de Santa Cruz Bridge

The San Roque González de Santa Cruz Bridge iis an international cable-stayed road-rail bridge that spans the Paraná River, connecting the cities of Posadas, Argentina, and Encarnación, Paraguay. Originally proposed in 1977 as compensation to Paraguay for territorial flooding caused by the Yacyretá Dam, the 2,550-meter (8,366 ft) structure features a 570-meter (1,870 ft) main span and a 1,595-meter (5,233 ft) approach viaduct, accommodating both vehicular traffic and the Posadas-Encarnación International Train. It is named in honor of Saint Roque González de Santa Cruz, a 17th-century Jesuit missionary who founded reductions in the region and was canonized by Pope John Paul II in 1988.

Though construction began in 1981 under an Italian-led consortium by Impregilo with a projected three-year timeline, the project faced a decade of delays and a financial scandal before its inauguration on 2 April 1990. Following a political shift in Argentina in 1989, incoming government ministers authorized substantial state compensation for the contractors by overturning a prior waiver agreement on the grounds of state coercion. This payout was subsequently declared illegal by the National Court of Accounts (Tribunal de Cuentas de la Nación), which determined that the claims of coercion were fabricated and that the contractor-drafted agreement already favored the consortium at the state's expense.

== History ==
It was first proposed in 1977 through an agreement between the governments of Argentina and Paraguay, as compensation to Paraguay for the flooding of part of its territory by the Yacyretá Dam. Its construction began in 1981 and was planned to last three years, but it was not finished until 1990. It was inaugurated on 2 April 1990. The bridge is named after Roque González y de Santa Cruz.

The bridge is named after Saint Roque González de Santa Cruz, a Jesuit missionary who founded reductions across the Río de la Plata region, including Posadas and Encarnación. He was canonized by Pope John Paul II in 1988 for his evangelical work alongside the Guarani people.

=== Construction scandal ===
It was constructed by a consortium led by the Italian company Impregilo. On November 12, 1987, the construction consortium requested a contract price adjustment to cover rising financial, import, international inflation, and Bonex exchange rate expenses. But, both the Ministry of Public Works and Services and the Dirección Nacional de Vialidad rejected the demand. They pointed to a 1985 agreement in which Dirección Nacional de Vialidad had extended the project's deadline in exchange for the contractors waiving all future claims for extra charges; consequently, the state agreed to cover only verified increases in the cost of imported materials.

Then, following Carlos Menem’s presidential victory in 1989, Roberto José Dromi overturned this decision by ruling that the contractors' 1985 waiver had been obtained through state coercion. The decision was backed by an ad hoc commission that concluded the contract's financial balance had been altered. After that, Dromi and Antonio Erman González authorized state compensation to the affected companies in 1990. However, the Tribunal de Cuentas de la Nación (Argentine supreme audit institution) objected, declaring that the ministers' resolutions are illegal and in violation of the country's accounting Law. Then, the Tribunal de Cuentas de la Nación revealed that the alleged coercion was fabricated, since the Dirección Nacional de Vialidad had already waived penalties and extended deadlines before the agreement, and noted that the contract, drafted by the companies themselves, already included clauses allowing them to collect payments tied to actual project progress.

== Description ==
It has a 2,550-meter (8,366 ft) long cable-stayed bridge that crosses the Paraná River between the cities of Posadas, capital of Misiones Province, Argentina, and Encarnación, capital of Itapúa, Paraguay. The main bridge is 570 meters (1,870 ft) long, and the approaching viaduct is 1,595 metres (5,233 ft) long. The road-rail bridge is also crossed by the Posadas-Encarnacion International Train.

== See also ==
- General Urquiza Railway
- Rail transport in Paraguay
- List of international bridges
