= Cecilia Lueza =

Argentine artist, sculptor (born 1971)

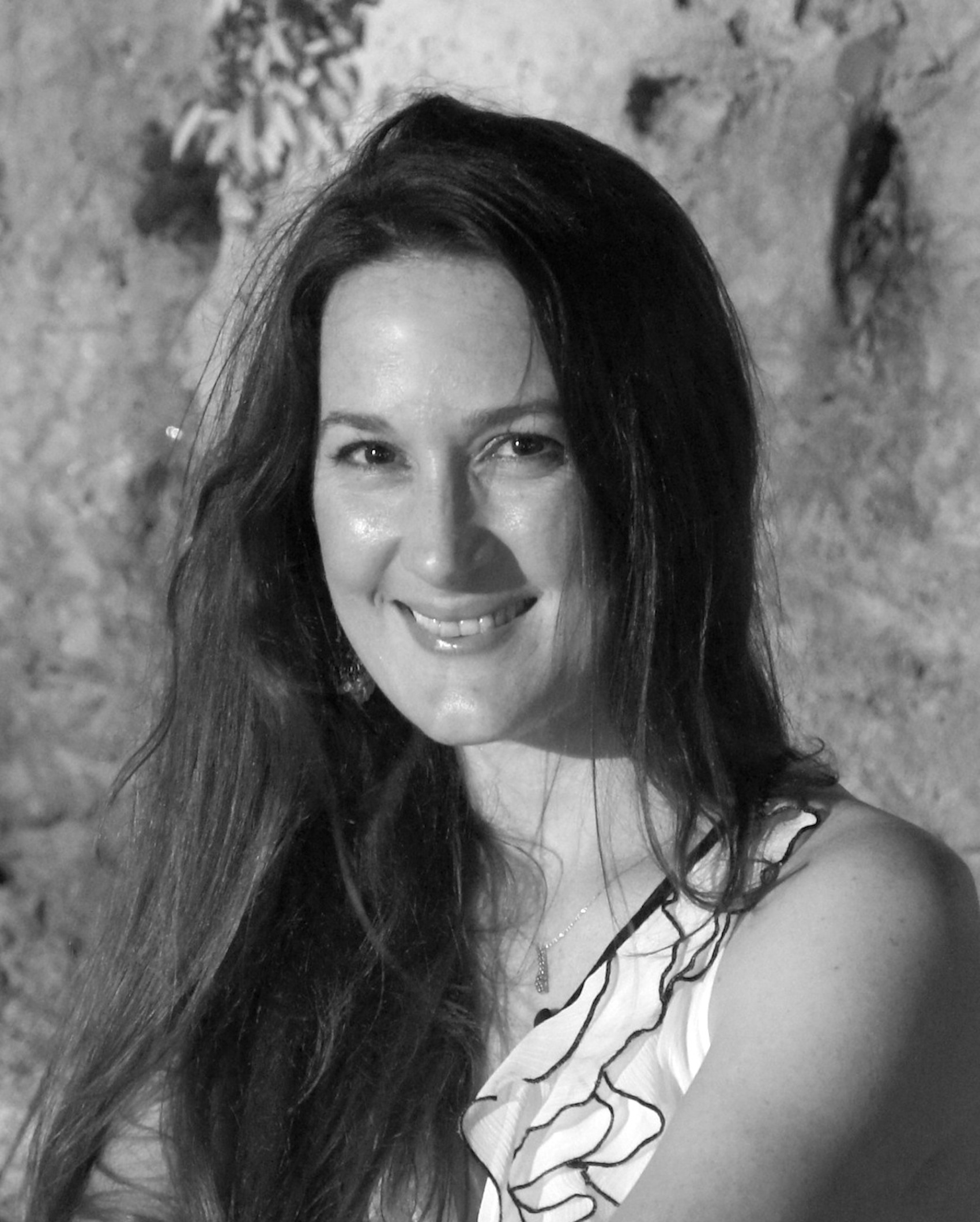
- Cecilia Lueza in 2011
- Born: Cecilia Lueza; 1971 (age 54–55); Posadas, Misiones, Argentina
- Education: National University of La Plata,
- Known for: Painter, sculptor
- Movement: Contemporary art
- Website: lueza.com

Cecilia Lueza (born 1971) is an Argentine-American painter and sculptor.

== Early life and education ==
Lueza is an Argentine artist who has lived in Florida since 1998. She earned her Masters in Painting at the Faculty of Arts in the National University of La Plata, Buenos Aires, Argentina.

== Life and work ==
In 1998 she had her first solo show in Buenos Aires. Shortly after she moved permanently to the United States. In the early 2000 Lueza began to show her work steadily in both group and solo shows in the United States, Argentina, Mexico, and the Caribbean.

Her first large-scale sculptures were exhibited in Orlando, Florida in 2002. Since then she has worked on site-specific art projects and public art projects as well as private and public art commissions throughout the United States and South America.

Her works include the sculpture series Diversity created between 2007 and 2011. The large-scale female faces are made of urethane and aluminum and painted in various shades of orange, red and yellow. The sculptures have a three-dimensional effect and represent women from different ethnicities, generations and beliefs that are unified through the artist's use of style and color.

Another work is Winds of Change, in Chattanooga, Tennessee. It consists of an angel-like figure on a stainless steel tube that is being held by the hand of a woman. The angel is kinetic and has been painted in a wide range of colors as a way of representing diversity, inclusiveness, hope and yearning. The sculpture was acquired for permanent display by the Chattanooga Public Art Commission.

In 2010 Lueza was commissioned to create a site specific work for the Arts and Innovation Center in Rockville, Maryland. Unveiled in May 2011, Luminarium consists of two interactive wall sculptures containing a fiber optic and light-emitting diode system activated in accordance with the frequency and intensity of sound. The lights will glow with different colors depending on the frequency of the sounds detected and the light pattern will change depending on the sound's direction. Each panel is 10 feet high by 6 feet wide and 10 inches in depth.

In December 2011, Lueza participated in Giants in the City, a public art exhibit of monumental inflatable sculptures that takes place each year in Miami, Florida.

== Solo exhibitions ==
2011:

- Dual Nature: The Work of Cecilia Lueza. Ormond Memorial Art Museum and Gardens. Ormond Beach, Florida, United States.
- Cecilia Lueza: Travesía. Museo de Arte Metropolitano. Buenos Aires, Argentina.

2009:

- Return to Innocence. Carnegie Gallery. Clearwater, Florida, United States.
- Return to Innocence. The Capitol Gallery. Florida State Capitol: Tallahassee, Florida, United States.

2008:

- Recent Work. Crossroads Gallery at St. Petersburg College. St. Petersburg, Florida

2007:

- Revelations. Karina Paradiso Fine Art. Buenos Aires, Argentina.
- Mystic: The Work of Cecilia Lueza. Centro Cultural Borges. Buenos Aires, Argentina.

2005:

- Cecilia Lueza: Exploring the Myths. Chelsea Galleria. Miami, Florida, United States.

2003:

- Cecilia Lueza. Naomi Silva Gallery. Atlanta, Georgia, United States.
- La Dimensión Inaudita. Galeria Mehr Licht. San Juan, Puerto Rico.

2002:

- Inner World. Kike San Martin Studios. Miami, Florida, United States.

2001:

- In Dreams. Miami Beach Botanical Garden. Miami Beach, Florida, United States.

2000:

- Heaviness & Lightness. Centro Cultural Borges. Buenos Aires Argentina.

== Public art projects and exhibitions ==
2012:

- Evacuspots Public Art Project. New Orleans, Louisiana, United States.
- Sculpture on Sample. Coral Springs, Florida, United States.
- Connections Sculpture Project. Blue Springs, Missouri, United States.

2011:

- Sculpt Miami at Red Dot Art Fair. Miami, Florida, United States.
- Giants in the City, Monumental Sculpture Exhibition. Miami, Florida, United States.
- Sculpture 360. Clearwater, Florida, United States.
- Art on Main Sculpture Exhibition. Chattanooga, Tennessee, United States.
- Council of Indianapolis Mural Program. Indianapolis, Indiana, United States.
- Avenue of the Arts, Sculpture Exhibition. Boynton Beach, Florida, United States.
- Pasadena Rotating Public Art Exhibition. Pasadena, California, United States.

2010:

- Arts and Innovation Center Project. Rockville, Maryland, United States.
- Avenue of the Arts, Sculpture Exhibition. Boynton Beach, Florida, United States.
- Urbana Sculpture Project. Urbana, Illinois, United States.
- Florida Outdoor Sculpture Competition. Lakeland, Florida, United States.
- WOW Art Without Walls. Sculpture Exhibition. St. Lucie County, Florida, United States.

2009:

- Sculpture Visions, Chapel Hill Museum. Chapel Hill, North Carolina, United States.
- Central Video Visitation Facility. Palm Beach, Florida, United States.
- Brainerd Project. Chattanooga, Tennessee, United States.
- University of West Florida. Child Development Center Project. Pensacola, Florida, United States.
- ARTLOUD Sculpture Exhibition. Downtown Tampa, Florida, United States.

2008:

- Third Biennial Sculpture Exhibition. Chattanooga, Tennessee, United States.
- UWA Outdoor Sculpture Exhibition. Livingston, Alabama, United States.
- Artscape Project. Pittsfield, Massachusetts, United States.

2007:

- Waterworks of Art, Outdoor Sculpture Exhibition. Blue Springs, Missouri, United States.
- Urban Trees 4. Port of San Diego. San Diego, California, United States.
- JUST Sculpture Tour. Union University. Jackson, Tennessee, United States.
- Sculpture on the Grounds. Glenview Mansion. Rockville, Maryland, United States.
- Drift, Art Walk Exhibition. Walter E. Washington Convention Center. Washington, D.C., United States.
- Home Bound. Williams Park. St. Petersburg, Florida, United States.

2006:

- Corazones Vivos. Public Art Project. Buenos Aires, Argentina.
- Sculpture Key West at Fort Zachary Taylor. Key West, Florida, United States.
- School of Visual Arts Sculpture Garden, University of Louisiana at Monroe. Monroe, Louisiana, United States.
- Waterworks of Art, Outdoors Sculpture Exhibition. Blue Springs, Missouri, United States.

2005:

- Rapture: 23 Annual BWAC Sculpture Show. Brooklyn Bridge, New York, United States.
- Sculpture Key West. International Sculpture Exhibition. Key West, Florida, United States.
- Ephemeral Trends at Arteamericas Art Fair. Coconut Grove, Florida, United States.

2004:

- Wind, Sea, Sky: Sculpture on the Beach. Newport, Rhode Island, United States.
- Sculpture Key West. International Sculpture Exhibition. Key West, Florida, United States.

2003:

- Downtown Orlando Sculpture Program. Orlando, Florida, United States.

== Group exhibitions ==
2012:

- Arte Argentino (Consulado General de la República Argentina en Miami). Arteamericas 2012. Miami, Florida, USA.
