= Dirección Nacional de Vialidad =

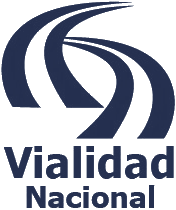

Agency overview
- Formed: October 1932; 93 years ago
- Jurisdiction: Argentina
- Status: Dissolved
- Headquarters: Buenos Aires
- Employees: 5,184
- Agency executive: Marcelo Campoy, General Administrator
- Parent Secretariat: Transport (Ministry of Economy)
- Website: argentina.gob.ar/vialidad

Dirección Nacional de Vialidad (also called Vialidad Nacional; English: National Directorate of Roads), is an Argentine government agency controlled by the Secretariat of Transport. Its mission is to project, build, maintain, improve and expand the road transport network in Argentina. In the case of executing extensions, the DNV has powers to declare the land corresponding to the road as public utility, which enabled the beginning of expropriation trials. The DNV had 2,802 employees in 2006. At the moment of the announce of its dissolution in 2025, the plant had increased to 5,184, of which 67% fulfilled administrative functions and 33% were in charge of operational functions.

The dissolution of the agency had been announced by the Government of Argentina in a press conference and officialised one day later through decree n° 461/2025. Nevertheless, On July 17, 2025, the court of General San Martín Partido gave rise to a precautionary presented, suspending the dissolution. The government appealed the ruling.

Decree 461 was then rejected by the Argentine National Congress so Vialidad continued operating.

== History ==
=== Background ===
In 1922, the First National Congress of Roads was held in Argentina, followed by the First Pan American Congress of Roads held in Buenos Aires in 1925.

During the presidency of Marcelo T. de Alvear, the Minister of Public Works, Roberto M. Ortiz, presented to the Argentine National Congress a draft road legislation, although it was never discussed.

Between 1928 and 1932, numerous projects which promoted the consideration of the road issues, were also presented with the support of provincial legislators and civil organizations such as the Touring Club Argentino (TCA). Technical advisors, such as engineers Roberto Kurtz and Lucas A. Barrionuevo, collaborated with deputies to justify the bills, emphasizing the importance of technical knowledge to legitimize the proposals.

During these discussions, international road experiences were analyzed, especially those from the United States, Italy, and Germany. The American road system was considered a model to follow for its ability to develop automobile-friendly roads, shortening distances between cities and improving traffic flow. In terms of organization, the Italian proposal stood out for its institutional autonomy, guaranteeing the continuity of construction projects regardless of political changes. Furthermore, consideration was given to Canada's experience in financing highways through gasoline taxes and the expropriation of land to enhance the value of areas near new roads.

=== Establishment ===
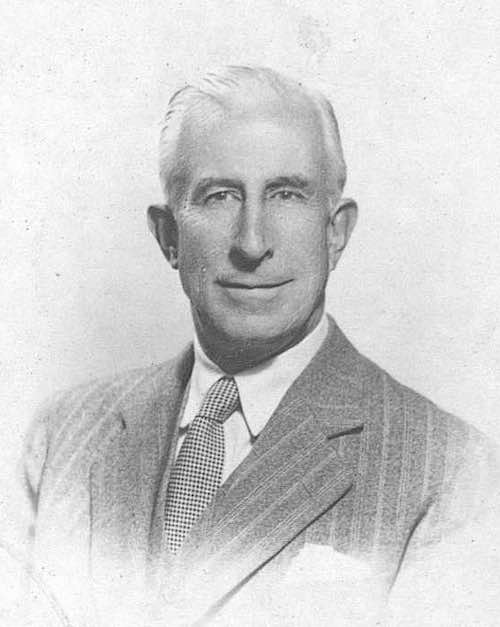
Justiniano Allende Posse, first director of Vialidad Nacional

The "Dirección Nacional de Vialidad" was created in October 1932 through law 11.658. The DNV, established under the government of Agustín P. Justo, was an autonomous entity of the national state, transforming the former department of the Ministry of Public Works. By the 1930s, the National Roads Law was a response to the demands of various social sectors seeking a low-cost trunk road system. In 1931, the country had only 2,000 km of roads.

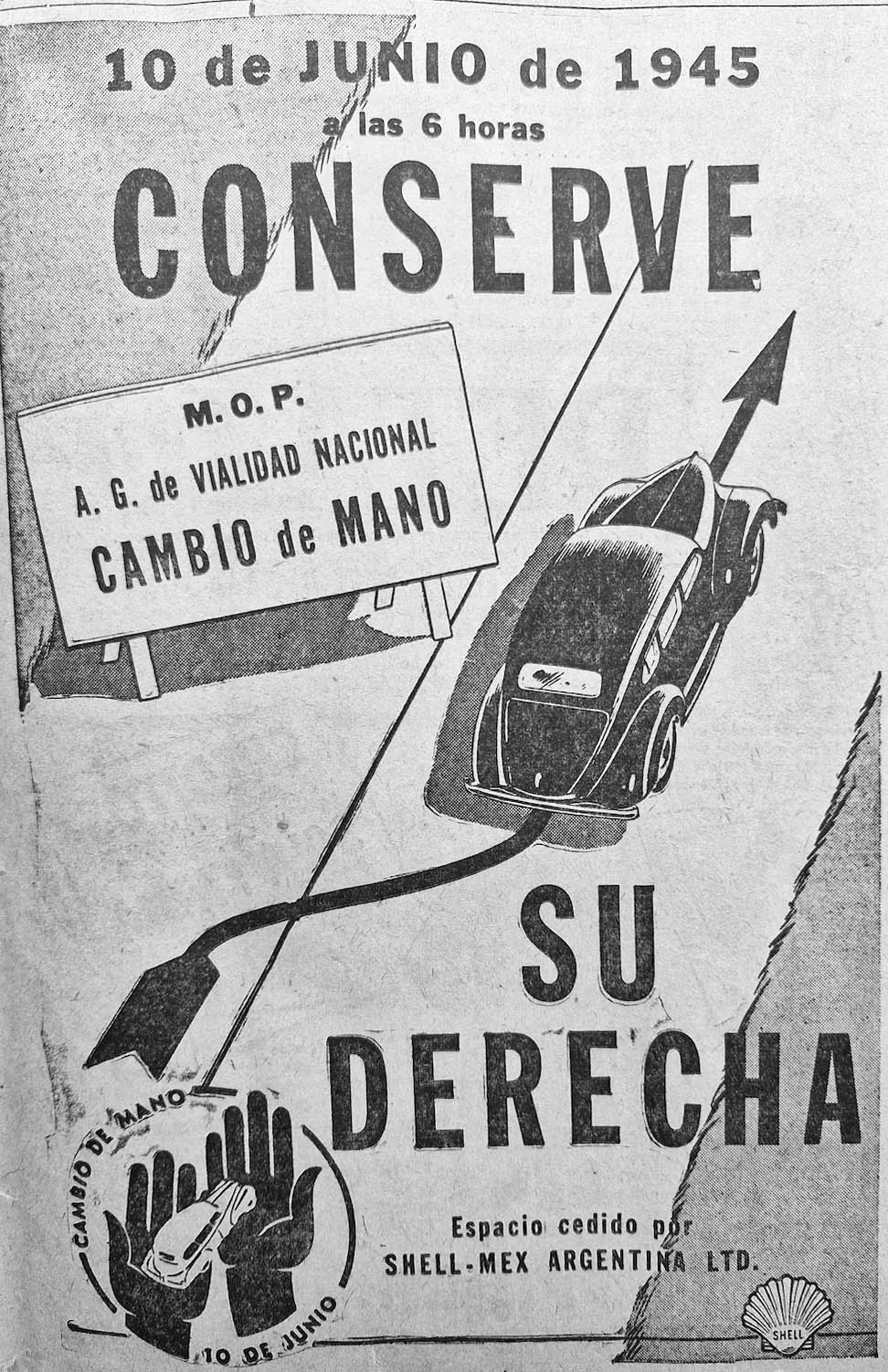
Ad for the right-hand traffic transition in 1945

The first Director of Vialidad National was Justiniano Allende Posse, who was a strong impeller of the national roads system. Allende Posse was in charge until 1938. Under his direction, the road system of Argentina increased from 2,000 to 30,000 km.

With a budget of mn$ 60 million between 1932 and 1934, increased to almost 70 million for the next two years. Some finished roads under Allende Posse's direction included route 5 (Mercedes to Chivilcoy), bridges over Salado River and Samborombón of RN 2, some paths of RP 11, the route from Neuquén to Zapala, among other works.

Minister of Public Works Juan Pistarini was another impeller of a large number of road and infrastructure projects. Among his most notable works were the construction of thousands of kilometers of roads, the right-hand traffic transition, and the construction of Ezeiza International Airport and the highway connecting it to Buenos Aires. Pistarini brought together regional and sectoral representatives, involving stakeholders from the transportation and communications sectors in his leadership. The government focused on the construction, maintenance, and improvement of roads, developing a national highway system that connected provincial capitals, production centers, ports, and railway stations. The transition to right-hand traffic was implemented on June 10, 1945.

=== 1970s to 1990s ===
On July 24, 1979, during the National Reorganization Process government, the highways were transferred to the provinces, so Vialidad Nacional lost several of its functions.

Towards the beginning of the 1980s, the fiscal deficits recorded by the National Government, particularly in the second half of the 1980s, resulted in a considerable portion of the resources traditionally allocated to road system infrastructure being diverted to other areas. This situation of growing neglect reached its peak between 1985 and 1990, which led to the worsening of the critical state of national roads. In 1989, barely a third of the paved national road network was passable.

In 1988 during the government of Raúl Alfonsín the first road concessions to private groups began, through the minister Rodolfo Terragno, in a private meeting it was agreed that half of the kilometers would be awarded among the largest contractors, 22% to Grupo Roggio, 17% SOCMA (owned by Franco Macri) and 11% to Techint). The bidding for 9,800 km of national routes was resolved, which represented 25% of the total by extension, but meant 50% of the traffic and 66% of the possible collection, the leonine conditions have the contracts signed by the State were obtained through bribery.”

In 1990, specific funds for roads were eliminated, allowing the National Highway Administration to receive funds directly from allocations indicated in the General Budget of the Nation. That year, the Argentine National Congress also passed the State reform laws, which required the roads with the highest traffic volume to be transferred to private concessionaires. Road concessions faced problems with the design of their normative or regulatory framework; road concessions on highway corridors were subject to an almost systematic situation of non-compliance or renegotiation of certain contractual clauses by the companies.

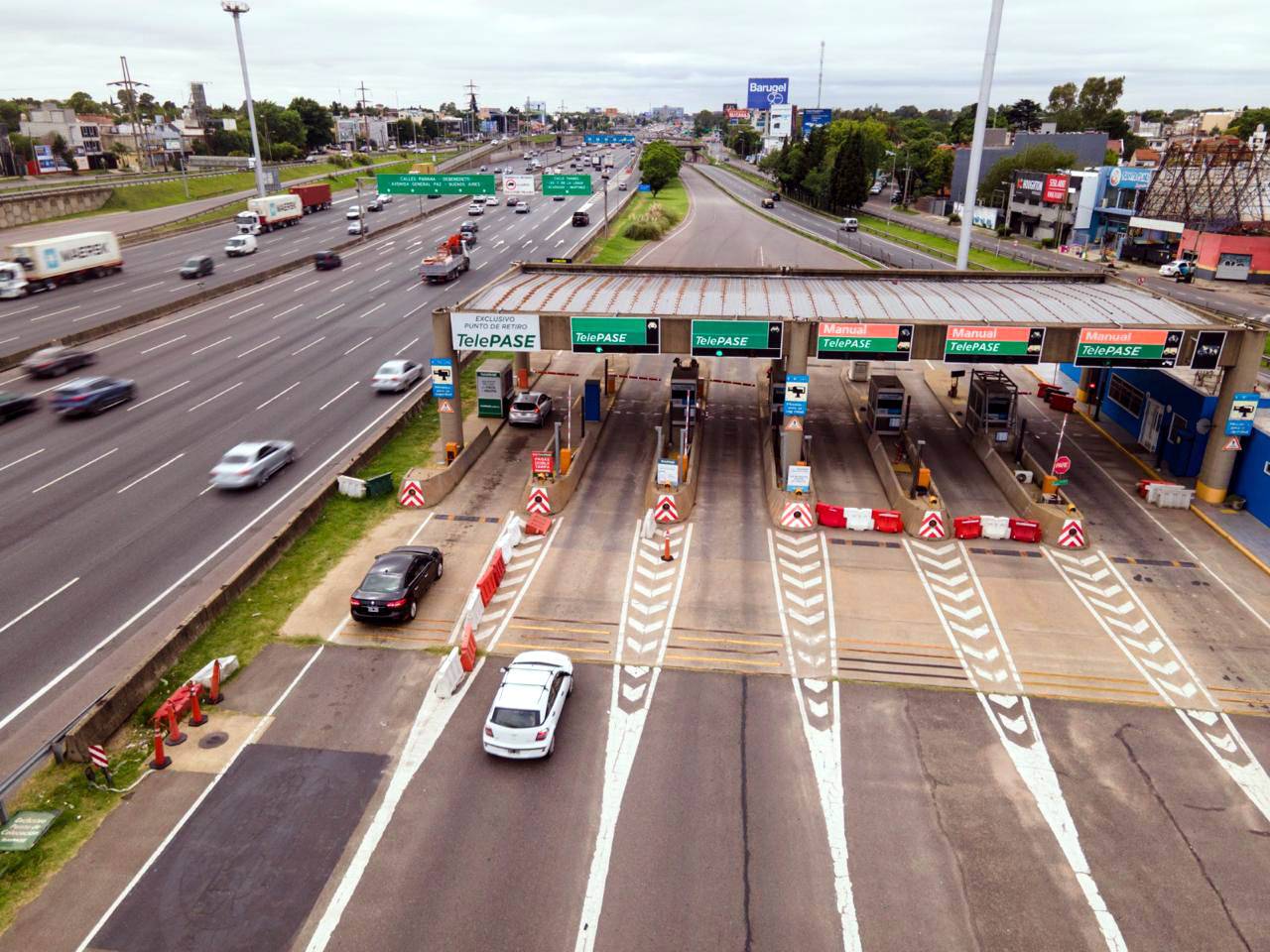
During the presidency of Carlos Menem, most of the national routes were granted in concession with the right to collect tolls. Acceso Norte (pictured) was one of those roads

With the arrival of Carlos Menem to the presidency of Argentina, the Macri Group expanded its business through some of the privatizations considered scandalous. In 1990, Servicios Viales S.A. was awarded the toll concession for 1,080.51 kilometers of national routes. Including a complaint from the Anti-Corruption Office against Fernando De la Rúa and several of his ministers for fraud against the public administration, embezzlement of public funds, and negotiations incompatible with public office, following two decrees that favored the concessionaires of major national routes. Among those accused was the Undersecretary of Public Works, Edgardo Gastón Plá, who had worked at Sideco Americana de Chile, two firms that were part of the Macri business conglomerate.

In February 1991, the cost of tolls increased by almost 70% to such an extent that the basic rate for a car was, on average, among the highest in the world, around US$2.50/50 km. The concession of the road network was left in the hands of an oligopoly of companies, including Autopistas Ezeiza-Cañuelas S.A., Coviares S.A. Grupo Concesionario del Oeste S.A. and Autopistas del Sol S.A., among them several managers of the latter who would be investigated for bribery.

=== 2000s ===
Decree 802 of June 15, 2001, created a state-owned company called ENAVIAL, liquidating the DNV. Following intervention by the National Congress, the measure was reversed in August of the same year.

By National Decree 1020 of 2009, the "Control Agency Road Concessions" (Organismo de Control de Concesiones Viales, mostly known for its acronym OCCOVI) became dependent on DNV. This body had the power to oversee compliance with concession contracts for nearly 10,000 km of high-traffic national roads.

During the administration of President Néstor Kirchner, a "National Road Plan" was launched. The plan included investments for the construction of 1,300 km of new roads, the paving of 4,100 km of national routes, and the coverage of the entire national road network with maintenance works. Furthermore, maintenance work was extended to the entire paved road network, whereas in 2003 it was only covered 50%. These investments, from 2003 to 2014, resulted in a 130% growth in the Argentine road network.

In 2016 the DNV decreed an increase of up to 500% in all tolls on national routes and highways of Argentina.

=== Closure ===
On July 7, 2025, the government of Javier Milei announced the closure of Vialidad Nacional. which was officialised through decree 461/2025 published on Boletín Oficial. The government alleged that the closure would allow to save more than 100 million dollars, stating that "the agency has a high staff and an extensive hierarchical configuration that hinders decision-making and reduces the agility of project execution, resulting in high operating costs for the National State". It was also stated that (the closure) "would optimise the maintenance of the routes with greater participation of the private sector".

Together with the DNV closure, the "National Transport Regulation Commission" (Comisión Nacional de Regulación del Transporte, CNRT) was also modified that was renamed concessions and public transport services agency. "... it will focus on the verification of regulatory and contractual compliance, and in the investigation of rail accidents" the government said. While the rest of the functions of the CNRT will be absorbed by the Secretariat of Transport of Ministry of Economy. This will be the application authority regarding standards, administrative acts related to the control of road concessions. Apart from the DNV, the Agencia Nacional de Seguridad Vial (ANSV) and the Comisión Nacional del Tránsito y la Seguridad Vial (CNTySV) were also dissolved.

As a result, all road works, projects, and maintenance of the 40,000 km of the 118 national routes were suspended. It will last until a next call for tender to give in concession 9,120 km of roads.

Nevertheless Decree 461 was stopped by the Judiciary —at the request of the Workers of Vialidad Nacional Union (mostly known by its acronym "SEVINA")— and rejected by the Argentine National Congress so Vialidad continued operating although the agency has fired 800 workers since 2023 and there are plans to fire other 900 as of 2026.

In January 2026, a technical report elaborated by Vialidad's workers revealed that 70% of the roads in Argentina were in poor condition. The report warned about a process of sustained dismantling of the country's road infrastructure and detailed its direct effects on safety, productive activity and the daily life of the population. Based on data and technical foundations, the document describes the abandonment of route maintenance, the underexecution of budget items and the emptying of National Roads, and links these policies with the increase in road accidents, the increase in logistics costs and the deterioration of the productive network. The report also raised the urgent need to declare a road emergency with the aim of prioritizing the protection of life, work and the development of the country.

== Management of roads in Argentina ==
The DNV had several model of business to manage the Argentine road network, they were:

=== Toll payment concession ===
The busiest routes were divided into three groups: "Road Corridors", with a length of 8,877 km; the "Access Network to the city of Buenos Aires, with a length of 236 km; and the "Access Network to Córdoba Province, with a length of 270 km, for a total of 9,383 km.

According to National Decree nro. 2039/90, the duration of the concessions was 12 years, starting in 1990. After a renegotiation, the National Executive Branch signed Decree 1817/92, which extended it to 13 years, expiring on October 31, 2003. The concession for Highway Corridor No. 18 (section Zárate to Paso de los Libres of national routes 12 and 14) was extended to 28 years (expiring on October 31, 2028), while Highway Corridor No. 29 (section Cipolletti to Neuquén of NR 22) was awarded in 1995 for a term of 18 years (expiring on April 30, 2013).

With the funds raised, the concessionaires had to maintain, remodel, carry out expansions requested by the DNV, improve, operate, and manage route sections, including signage, in addition to providing services to users.

=== Concession with private financing ===
This system was implemented in 1995 and consists of 10-year contracts paid for by the DNV, meaning they are toll-free. Roads had to complete a series of improvements in the third year of the contract.

There were two corridors with this system: the Resistencia section to the border with Paraguay of RN 11 and the Bahía Blanca section to the junction with RN 5 of RN 33.

=== Recovery and maintenance contracts ===
Those were five years contracts during which the winning company has one year to improve trafficability (to recover its investment), while in the following four years it had to carry out the necessary works to maintain the route in the same condition as at the end of the first year.

In 1997 and 1998, the first phase was tendered, consisting of 11,813 km of routes divided into 61 "networks." In 2004, 36 networks were tendered for a length of 5,424 km; in 2005, 6 networks were tendered; and another 36 networks were planned for 2006, for a total length of 5,500 km.

=== Modular system ===
This management method replaced the old km/month system and began operating in 2005. This system included not only maintenance, as in the old scheme, but also improvements to the concessioned section. Contracts lasted 24 months.

The modular system had been applied since 1979. It was created to contribute to solving the problems that arose in carrying out routine maintenance through contracting with private companies. This was due to the difficulties generated by providing fixed quantities for items in construction projects for the application of Law 13064, when the quantities of work executed for each item varied by percentages greater than 20% in relation to those stipulated in the contract. This gave either party the right to request the setting of new prices for the affected items..

=== Transfer of operational functions ===
This involved the road entities of each province carrying out maintenance works. Since the provincial agencies operated as contractors for the DNV, the latter had to pay it for the services provided.

=== Maintenance by administration ===
Under this modality, the sections served by this scheme were put out to tender to be served by the recovery and maintenance contracts.

== Road works by Vialidad Nacional ==
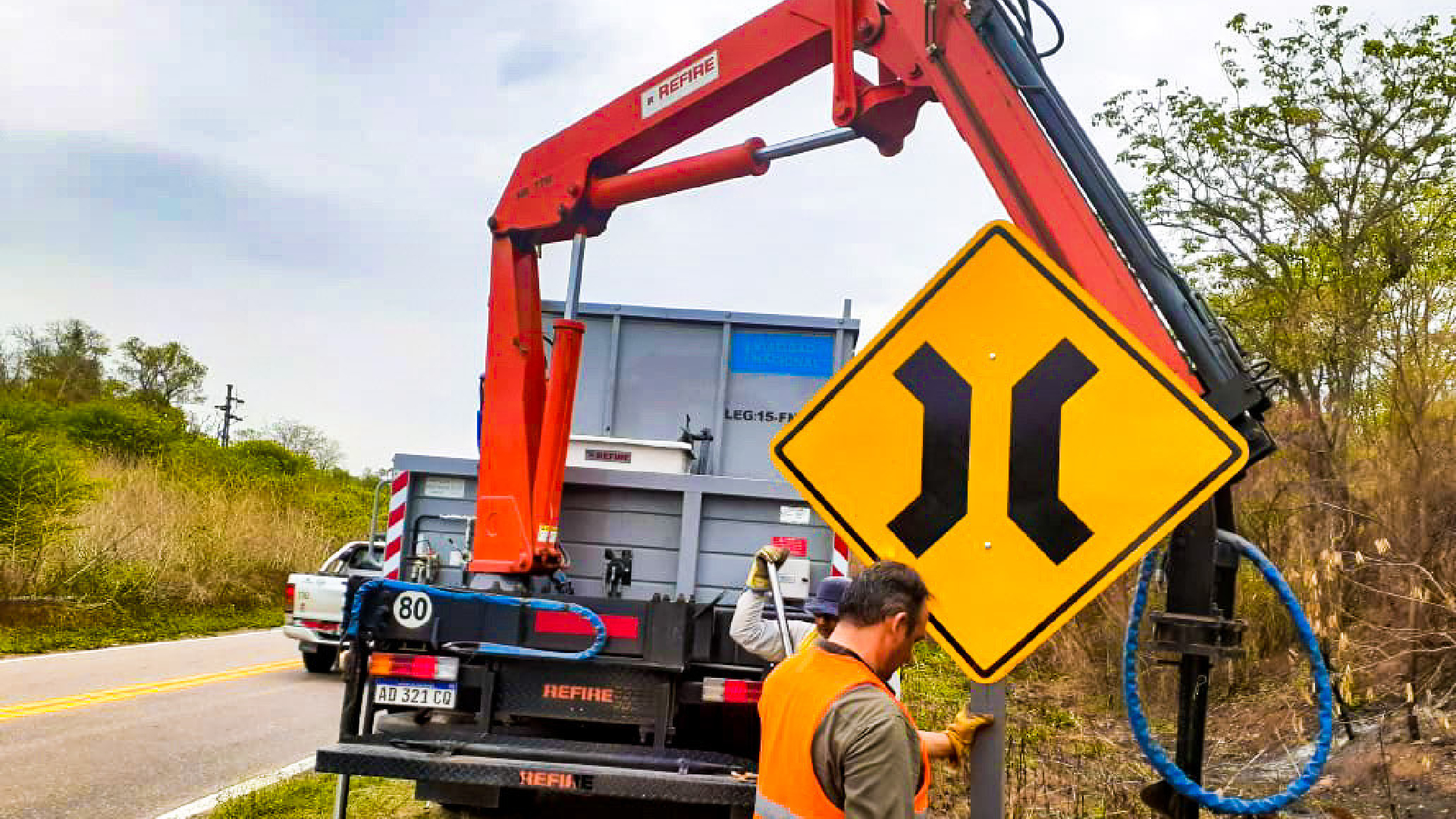
Placing a sign in Neuquén

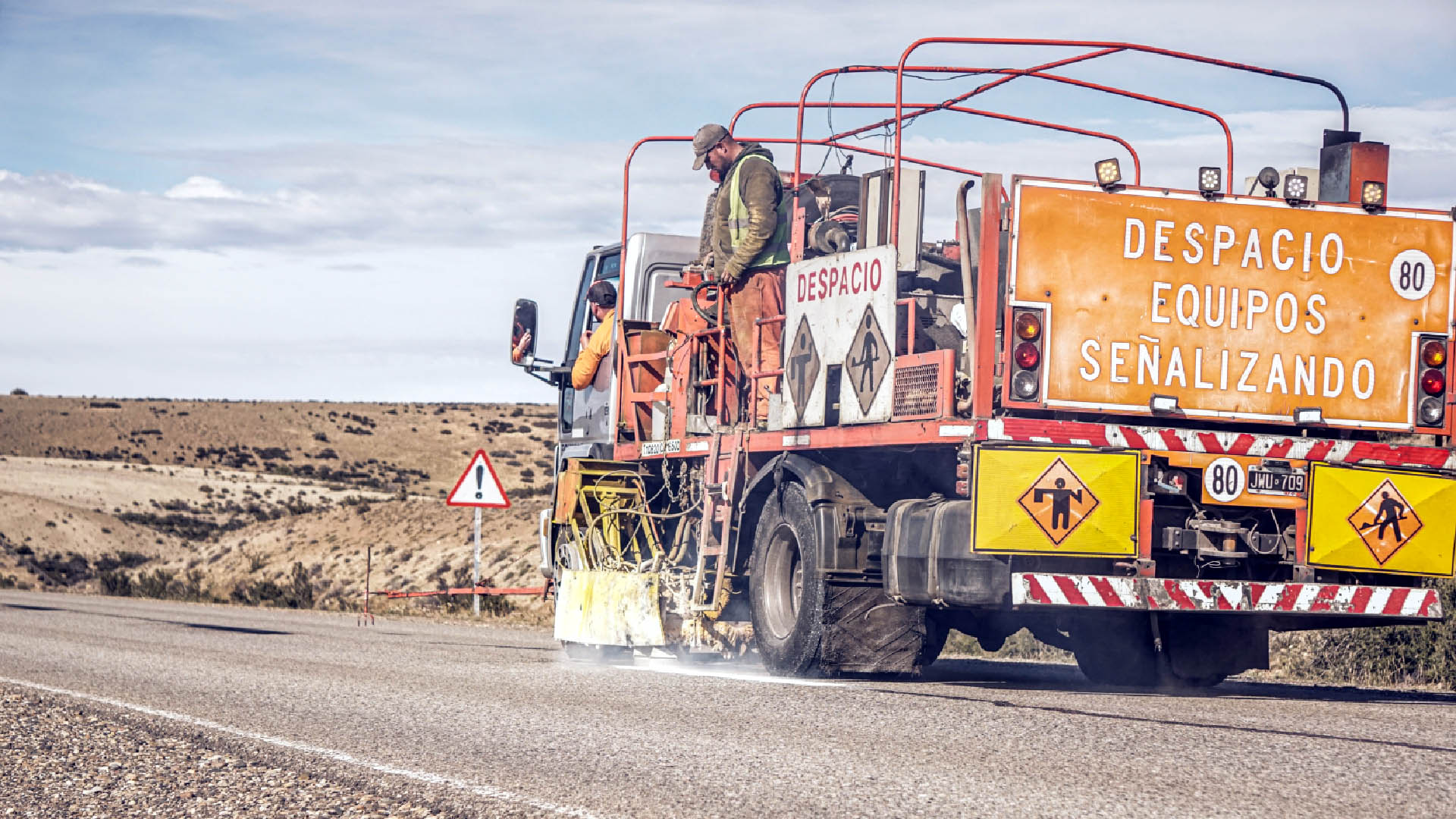
Horizontal signalling in Chubut

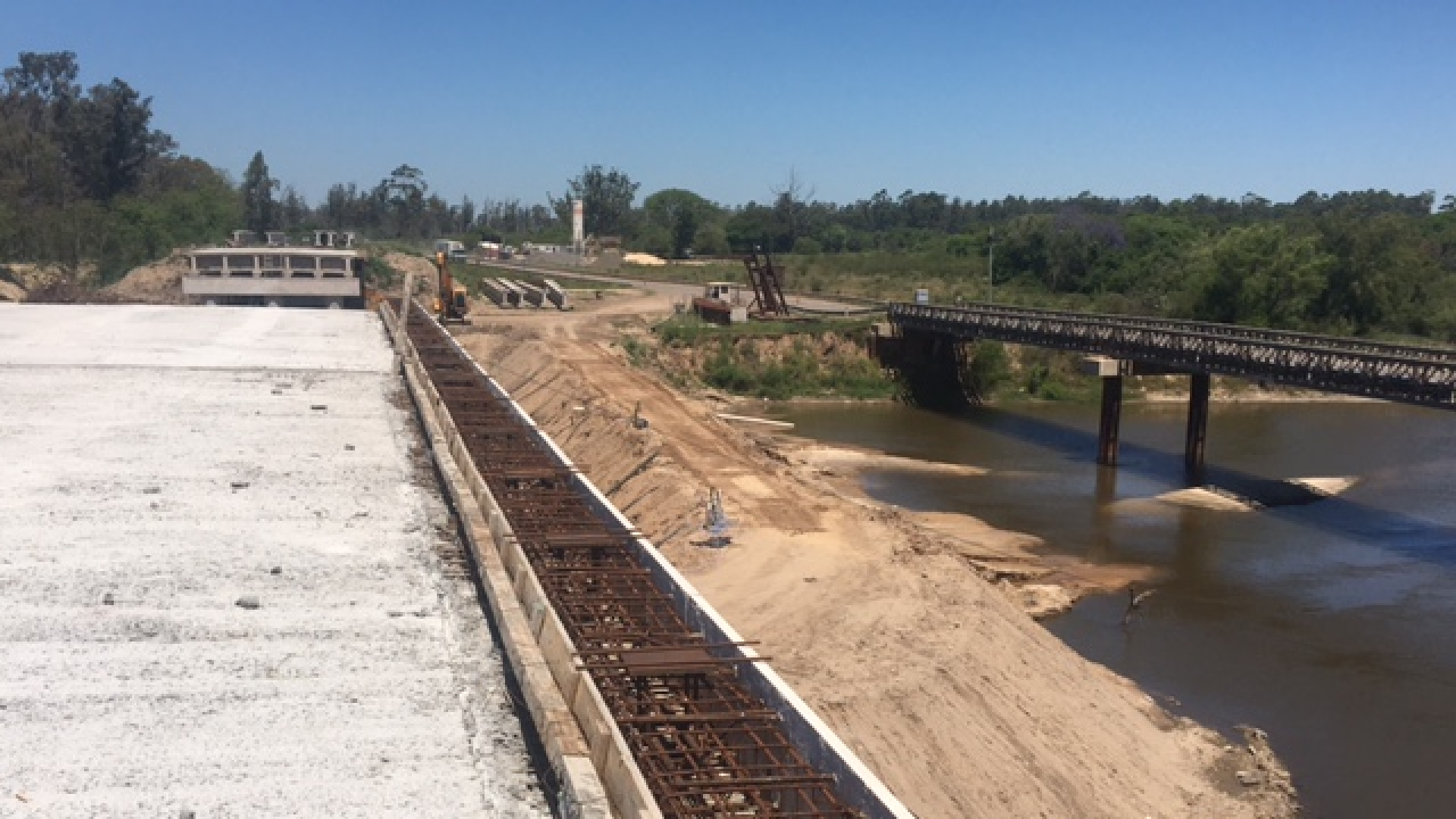
Construction of Arroyo Guazú bridge

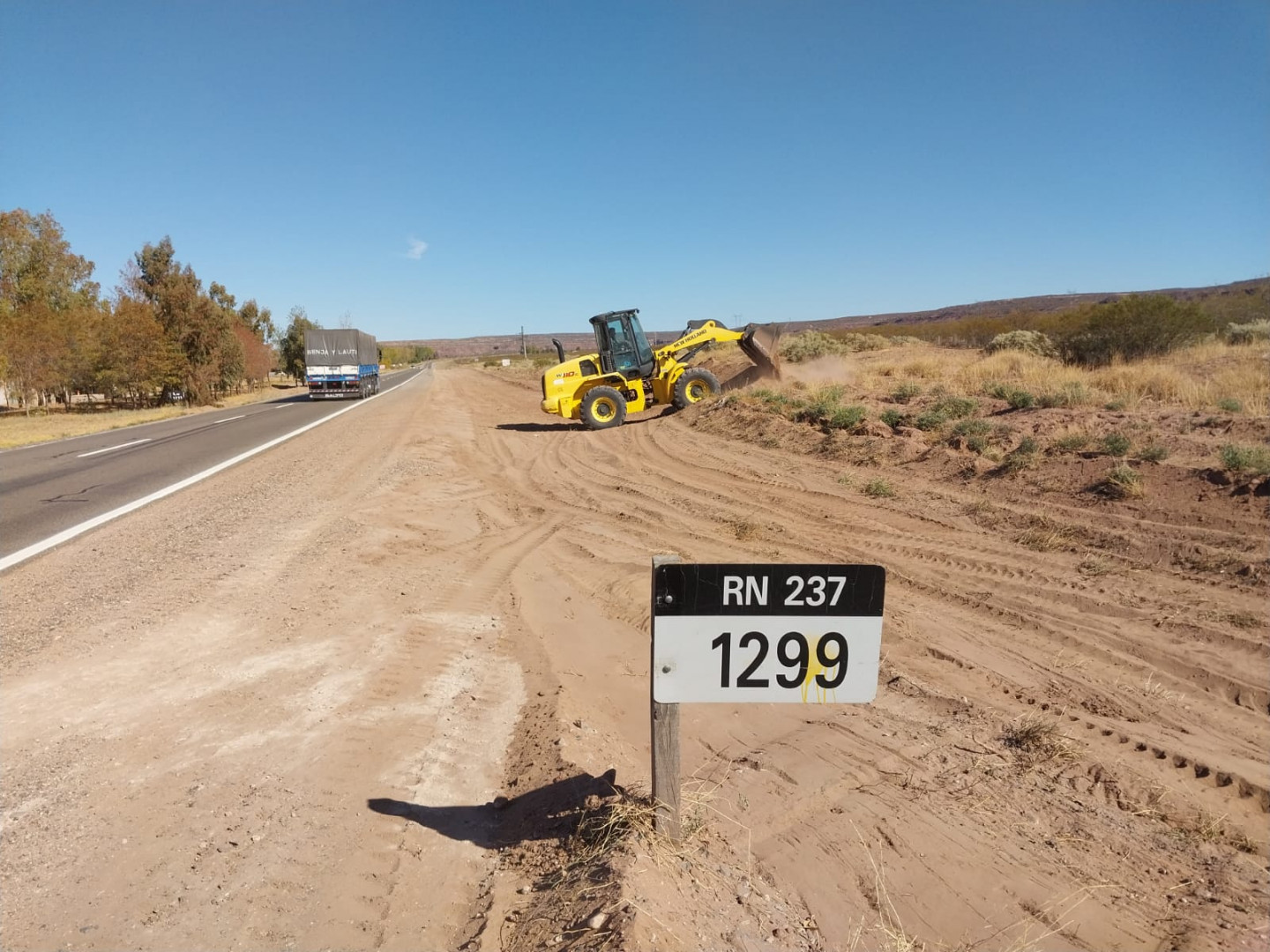
Works in R237

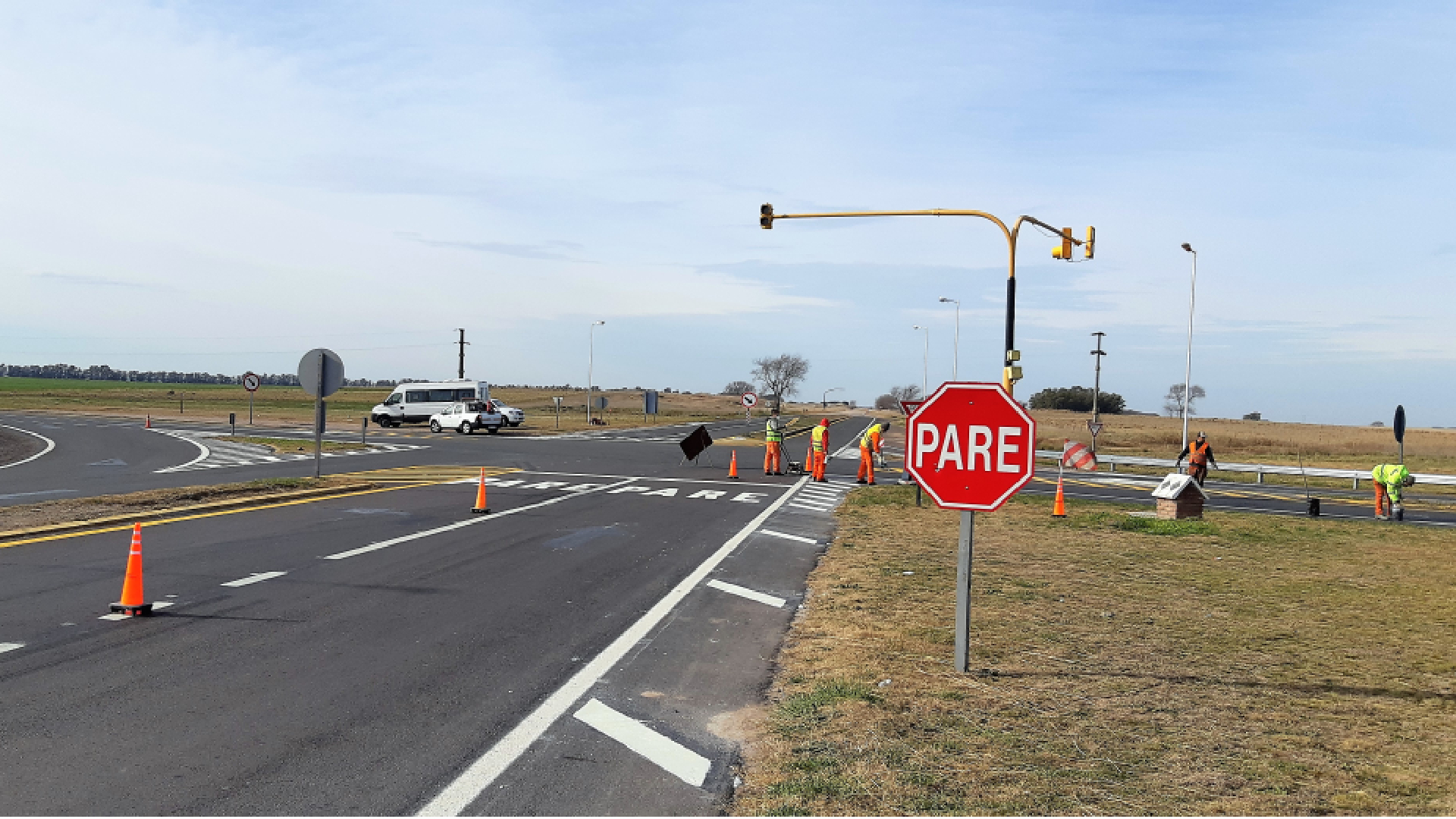
Works at route crossing
