= Encarnación, Paraguay =

District and city in Itapúa, Paraguay

Encarnación Nuestra Señora de la Encarnación de Itapúa
- District and City
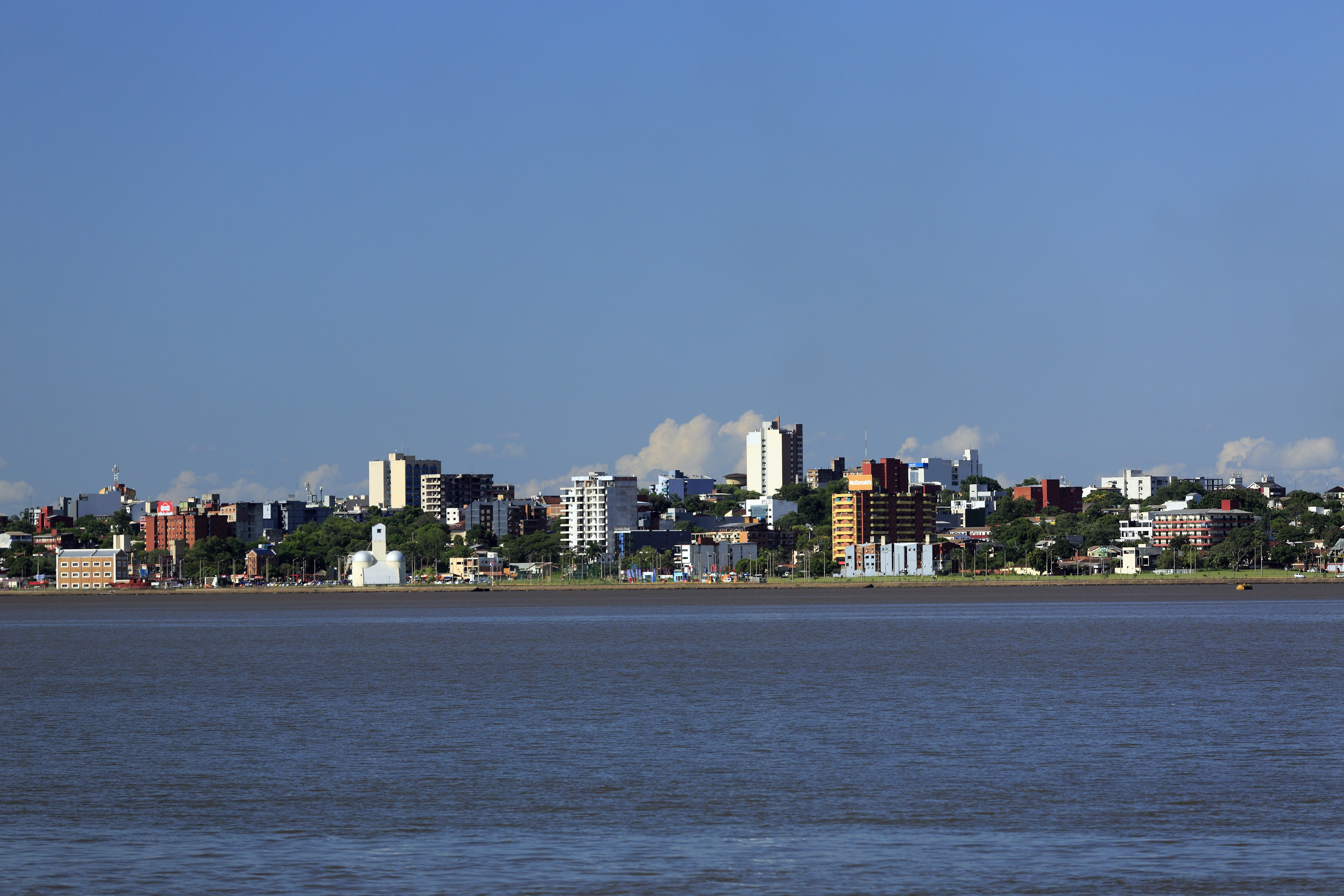
- Encarnación, Paraguay

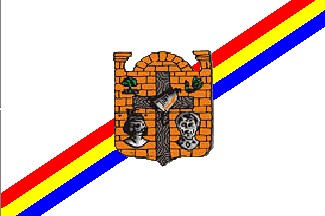
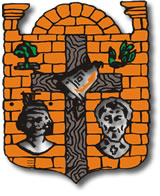
- Flag Coat of arms

- Location within Paraguay
- Coordinates: 27°19′48″S 55°52′48″W
- Country: Paraguay
- Department: Itapúa
- Founded: 15 March 1615

Government
  - Intendant: Luis Yd

Area
  - District and City: 274 km^{2} (106 sq mi)
- Elevation: 91 m (299 ft)

Population (2022)
  - District and City: 106,842
  - Density: 435/km^{2} (1,130/sq mi)
  - Metro: 173,170
- Time zone: UTC-03 (PYST)
- Area code: +595 71
- Climate: Cfa
- Website: encarnacion.gov.py

Encarnación (Spanish pronunciation: [eŋkaɾnaˈsjon]; Guarani: Enkarnasiõ) is a district and the capital city of Itapúa Department in Paraguay, located at the south-east of the department, on the right-hand (western) shore of the Paraná River, opposite Posadas, Argentina. The city has an area of 274 km^{2} and a population of 106,842 (2022 Census), and the Greater Encarnacion area has a population of around 200,000. Encarnación is the third-largest city of Paraguay. The city was originally named Nuestra Señora de la Anunciación de Itapúa.

Encarnación is connected to the Argentine city of Posadas by the San Roque González de Santa Cruz Bridge and the International Train. The city is located on Route 1, some 370 km (225 miles) from Asunción, and located on Route 6, some 280 km (175 miles) from Ciudad del Este. Due to its proximity, many Argentines travel to the city. The city is an important financing centre of Paraguay and maintains a commercial relationship with Argentine Posadas.

The Teniente Amin Ayub Gonzalez Airport (IATA: ENO, ICAO: SGEN), at coordinates 27°13′23″S 55°50′03″W, is 12 kilometres from the city and is the third most important airport of the country.

== Demographics ==
Encarnación is the capital of the department of Itapúa. According to the 2002 National Census, Encarnación has a total population of 93,497 and an urban population of 67,173.

Most of the inhabitants are of mixed Spanish and Amerindian descent as in the rest of Paraguay but there are also minorities of Germans, Ukrainians and Poles.

The city has the largest settlement of Ukrainians in Paraguay.

== History ==
The mission called Anunciación de Itapua was founded by Roque González y de Santa Cruz, a Jesuit priest, on 25 March 1615, on the southern side of the Paraná river. That mission was relocated to the north side in the current location of the city in 1703 under the name Encarncación de Itapua. It gained in importance after the coming of the railway in 1894.

In 1926, a destructive F5 tornado devastated the city, killing at least 300 and injuring around 500. It is the deadliest tornado in South American history.

On 20 February 1931, a student-worker group led by Obdulio Barthe took the city of Encarnación and declared it a "revolutionary commune", Encarnación Commune, under the leadership of popular assemblies.

In 1957, the city was made the seat of the Roman Catholic Diocese of Encarnación.

Because of its mild climate Encarnación is often called "The Pearl of the South". Encarnación was the birthplace of Alfredo Stroessner, general and head of state of Paraguay from 1954 to 1989.

The city has recently experienced a radical change, The "Plan de Terminación Yacyretá" (Termination plan of Yacyretá) resulted in the loss of the "Zona Baja", which gave way to a renewed modern city with wide avenues and bridges.

Encarnación was a host city for the 2003 Futsal Men's World Cup.

In 2015, Encarnación was Paraguay's third city with a growing economy and a multicultural and cosmopolitan population. Affordable contracts for work in certain business places, as bars, restaurants, discos and casinos, are easy to find in Encarnación.

== Tourism ==
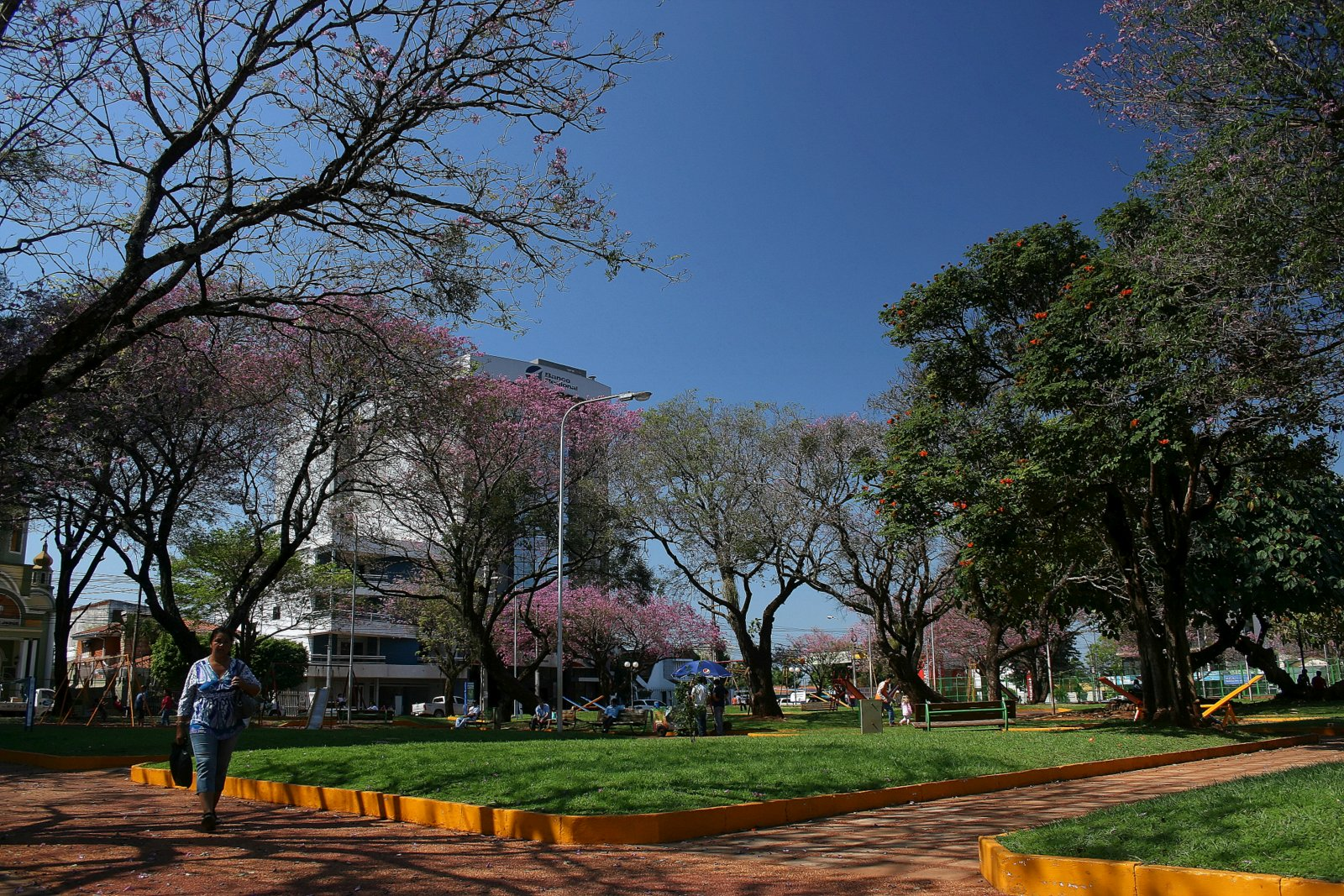
Plaza de Armas, main square of Encarnación, Paraguay.

Encarnación has become the tourism capital of the country with its wide beaches and newly completed waterfront boardwalk. The city is located near the Jesús and Trinidad Jesuit Ruins, declared World Heritage Sites by UNESCO in 1993, and the Beach in Carmen del Paraná. Due its location, at the Argentina–Paraguay border, the area is characterized by a high commercial and tourist exchange between Paraguay and Argentina.

In 2010, Encarnación began its transformation to become the centre of summer tourism for nationals and regionals. In December 2011 the Costanera Avenue was inaugurated and with it three beaches were opened to the public. These three beaches were the Mbói Ka’e Beach, the Pacu Cuá Beach, and the San José Beach. The San José Beach is the most visited of the three beaches by tourists and has several restaurants at the tourists’ disposal.

In January 2013, ABC Color reported that tourism in Encarnación moved at least US$10 million in the month, more than the US$5 million to US$6 million of the previous year. Prior to this, the city converted into a destination for thousands of tourists from all parts of the country, including tourists from other countries of the region.

In 2015 Encarnación reached a new peak in tourists that visited the city. With more than 30 000 people going there for their vacation Jaime Fernandez, head of the Hotel Association of Encarnación, confirmed that there were no places available throughout the Encarnación and lodgings were improvised 50 km (31 miles) around the city.

Encarnación's Carnival Party, taken place every January and February, attracts more than 100, 000 tourists. Different clubs will compete against each other on a parade in which they will be qualified by a group of judges under the following criteria: originality, design, charisma, dance, rhythm, beauty, and elegance.

Despite the protocols caused by COVID-19, there was a great quantity of tourists at Encarnación's beaches in January 2021. Given this, the city prepared its protocols for 9 months to be a safe destination for tourists.

== Geography ==
The city is located at the south-east of the department, on the right-hand (western) shore of the Paraná River, opposite Posadas, Argentina.

=== Climate ===
Encarnación has a humid subtropical climate (Köppen Cfa). Summers are hot and humid, and winters are temperate and cool. Due to its geographical position in the extreme south of the country, Encarnación is the coldest city in Paraguay.

Encarnación registered snowfall in the winter of 1975, the first time in the history of Paraguay.

The annual mean temperature is 21.4 °C (70.5 °F). The annual mean relative humidity is 73%.

Climate data for Encarnación (1991–2020, extremes 1931–present)
Month	Jan	Feb	Mar	Apr	May	Jun	Jul	Aug	Sep	Oct	Nov	Dec	Year
Record high °C (°F)	40.5 (104.9)	40.8 (105.4)	40.0 (104.0)	37.5 (99.5)	34.5 (94.1)	32.5 (90.5)	33.6 (92.5)	36.8 (98.2)	39.4 (102.9)	40.4 (104.7)	40.6 (105.1)	42.0 (107.6)	42.0 (107.6)
Mean daily maximum °C (°F)	32.8 (91.0)	32.2 (90.0)	31.0 (87.8)	28.0 (82.4)	24.0 (75.2)	22.3 (72.1)	22.2 (72.0)	24.7 (76.5)	26.1 (79.0)	28.5 (83.3)	30.3 (86.5)	32.2 (90.0)	27.9 (82.2)
Daily mean °C (°F)	26.4 (79.5)	25.7 (78.3)	24.4 (75.9)	21.6 (70.9)	17.8 (64.0)	16.4 (61.5)	15.6 (60.1)	17.6 (63.7)	19.5 (67.1)	22.1 (71.8)	23.6 (74.5)	25.7 (78.3)	21.4 (70.5)
Mean daily minimum °C (°F)	21.2 (70.2)	20.7 (69.3)	19.3 (66.7)	16.5 (61.7)	12.9 (55.2)	11.5 (52.7)	10.2 (50.4)	11.8 (53.2)	13.9 (57.0)	16.9 (62.4)	17.8 (64.0)	20.1 (68.2)	16.1 (61.0)
Record low °C (°F)	9.3 (48.7)	7.0 (44.6)	5.4 (41.7)	2.4 (36.3)	−1.7 (28.9)	−6.0 (21.2)	−4.0 (24.8)	−2.8 (27.0)	−0.6 (30.9)	1.6 (34.9)	4.8 (40.6)	7.0 (44.6)	−6.0 (21.2)
Average precipitation mm (inches)	165.2 (6.50)	131.1 (5.16)	148.9 (5.86)	179.9 (7.08)	137.0 (5.39)	117.0 (4.61)	94.4 (3.72)	79.7 (3.14)	130.1 (5.12)	239.0 (9.41)	179.8 (7.08)	202.3 (7.96)	1,804.3 (71.04)
Average precipitation days (≥ 0.1 mm)	9	8	7	8	7	8	8	8	9	9	9	9	98
Average relative humidity (%)	69	74	75	77	79	78	76	74	72	70	69	67	73
Mean monthly sunshine hours	254.2	220.4	220.1	171.0	179.8	159.0	189.1	182.9	153.0	201.5	252.0	269.7	2,452.7
Mean daily sunshine hours	8.2	7.8	7.1	5.7	5.8	5.3	6.1	5.9	5.1	6.5	8.4	8.7	6.7
Source 1: NOAA (precipitation days, humidity 1961-1990)
Source 2: Deutscher Wetterdienst (sun, 1988–1996)

Climate data for Encarnación
Month	Jan	Feb	Mar	Apr	May	Jun	Jul	Aug	Sep	Oct	Nov	Dec	Year
Mean No. of days with Precipitation ≥ 10.0 mm (0.39 in)	4.0	4.0	4.0	4.0	4.0	3.0	3.0	4.0	4.0	5.0	4.0	4.0	47.0
Mean number of days with thunder	3	3	3	2	2	2	2	2	2	4	2	2	29.0
Mean number of days with haze/smoke	2	1	1	1	1	0	3	8	7	4	4	3	35.0
Mean number of days with fog	0	1	1	2	4	3	3	2	1	1	0	0	18.0

== Consular representations ==
Argentina (Consulate), Brazil (Vice-consulate), and Japan (Consular Office) have consular representations in Encarnación.

== Transportation ==
The city is served by the Teniente Amin Ayub Gonzalez Airport.

== Religion ==
=== Places of Worship ===
Places of worship are predominantly Christian churches (Catholic and Orthodox).

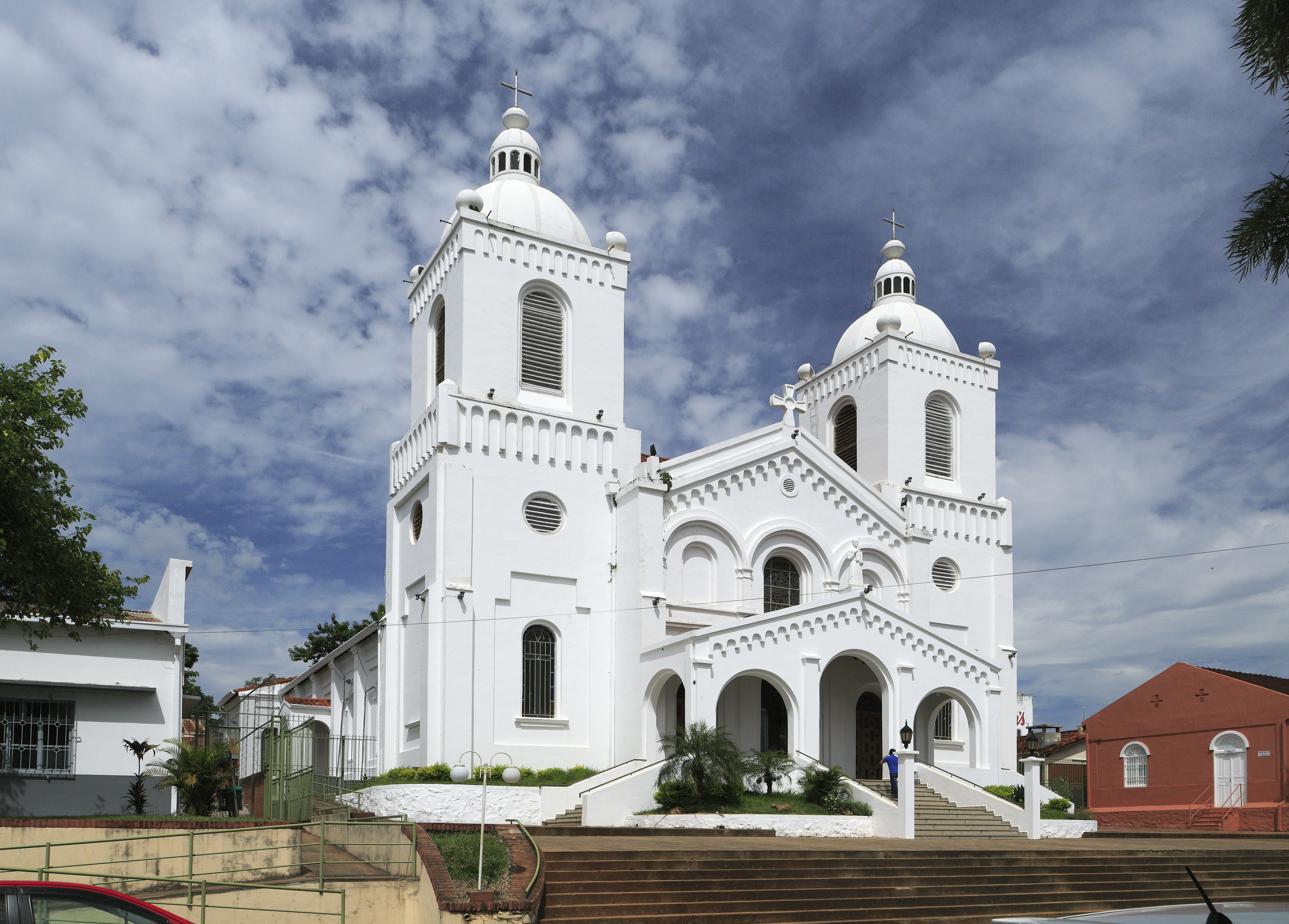
The Encarnación Cathedral, Paraguay

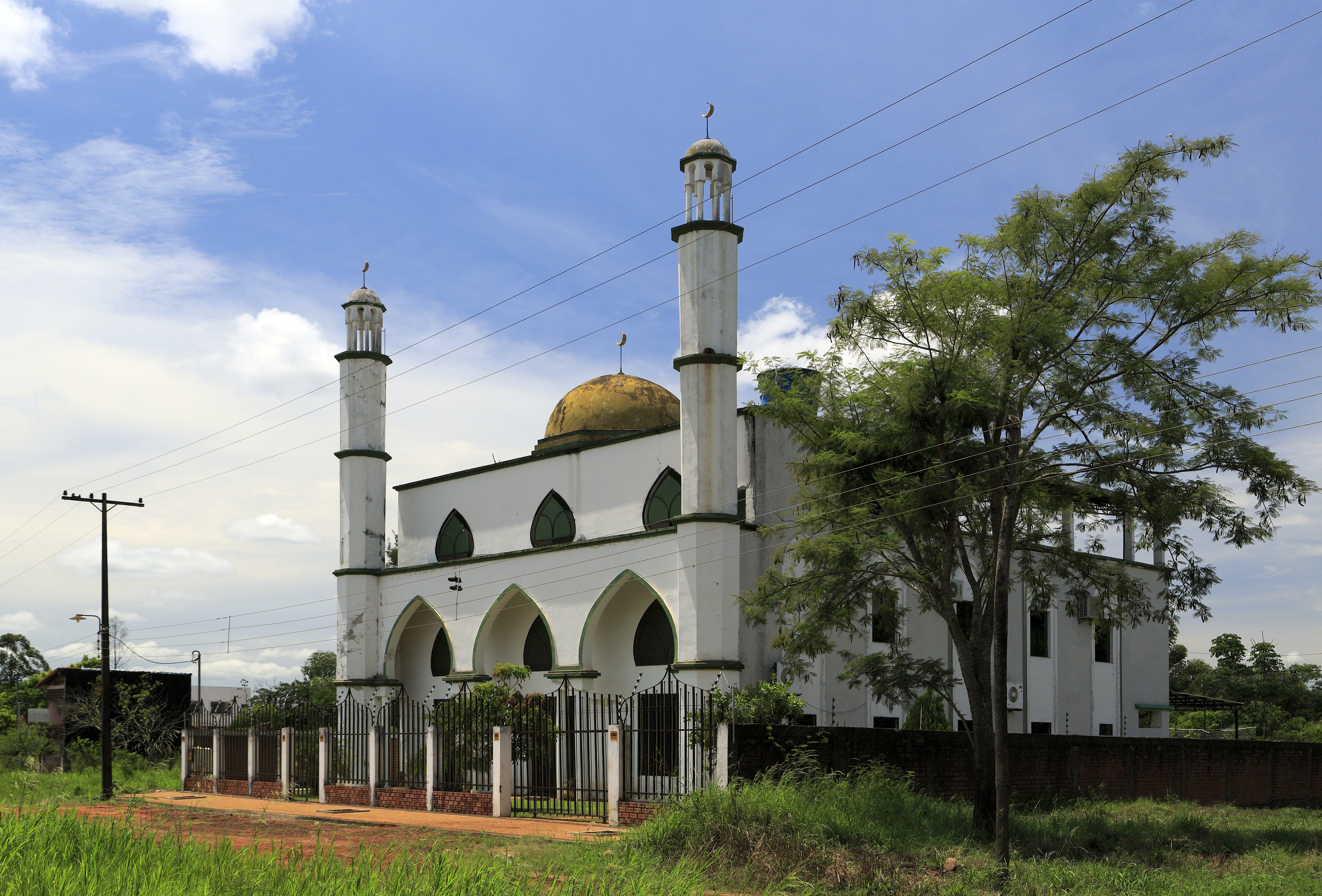
A Mosque in Encarnación. (Centro Benéfico Cultural Islámico de Encarnación). Paraguay

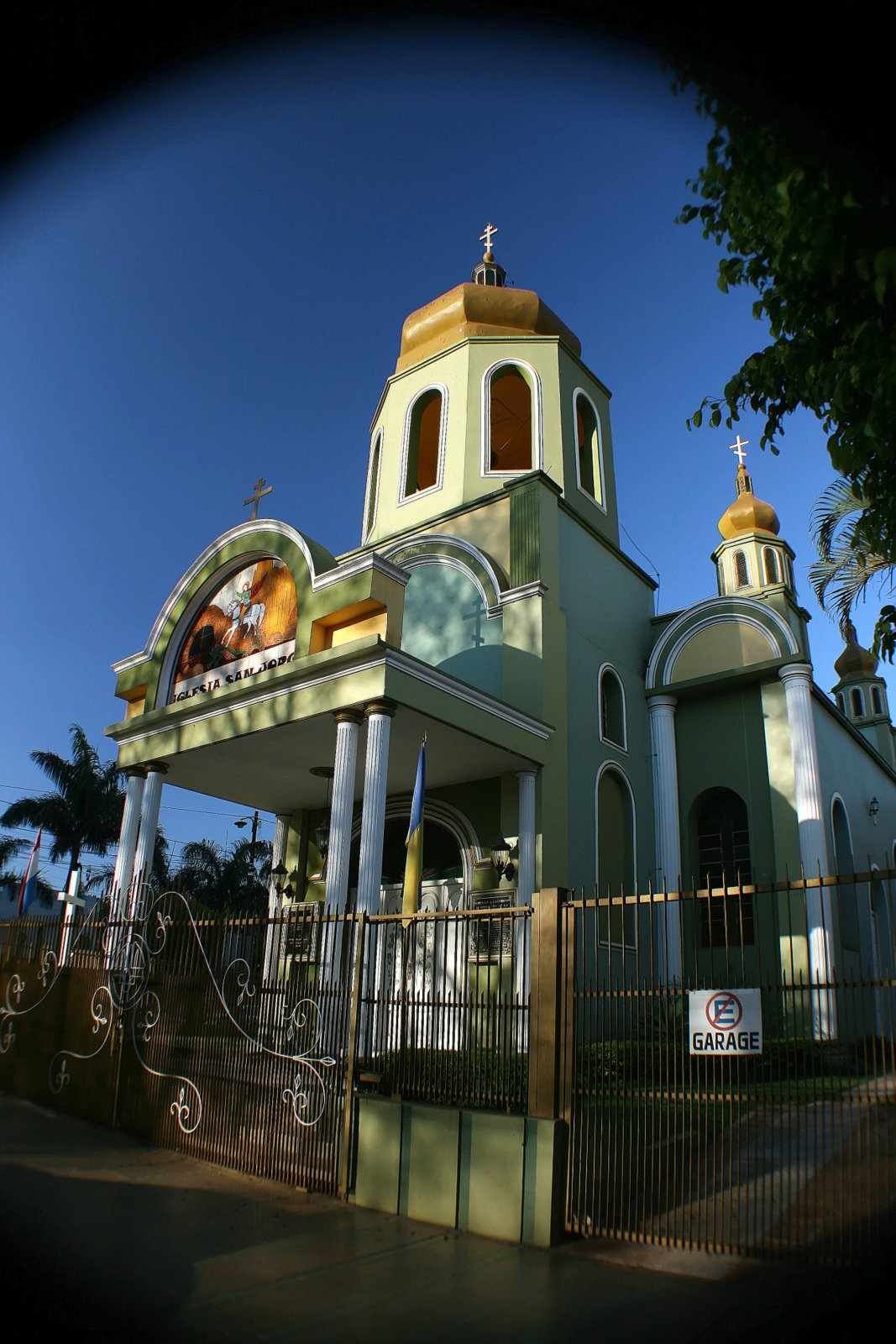
The Ukrainian Orthodox Cathedral of San Jorge, in Encarnación.

== Gallery ==
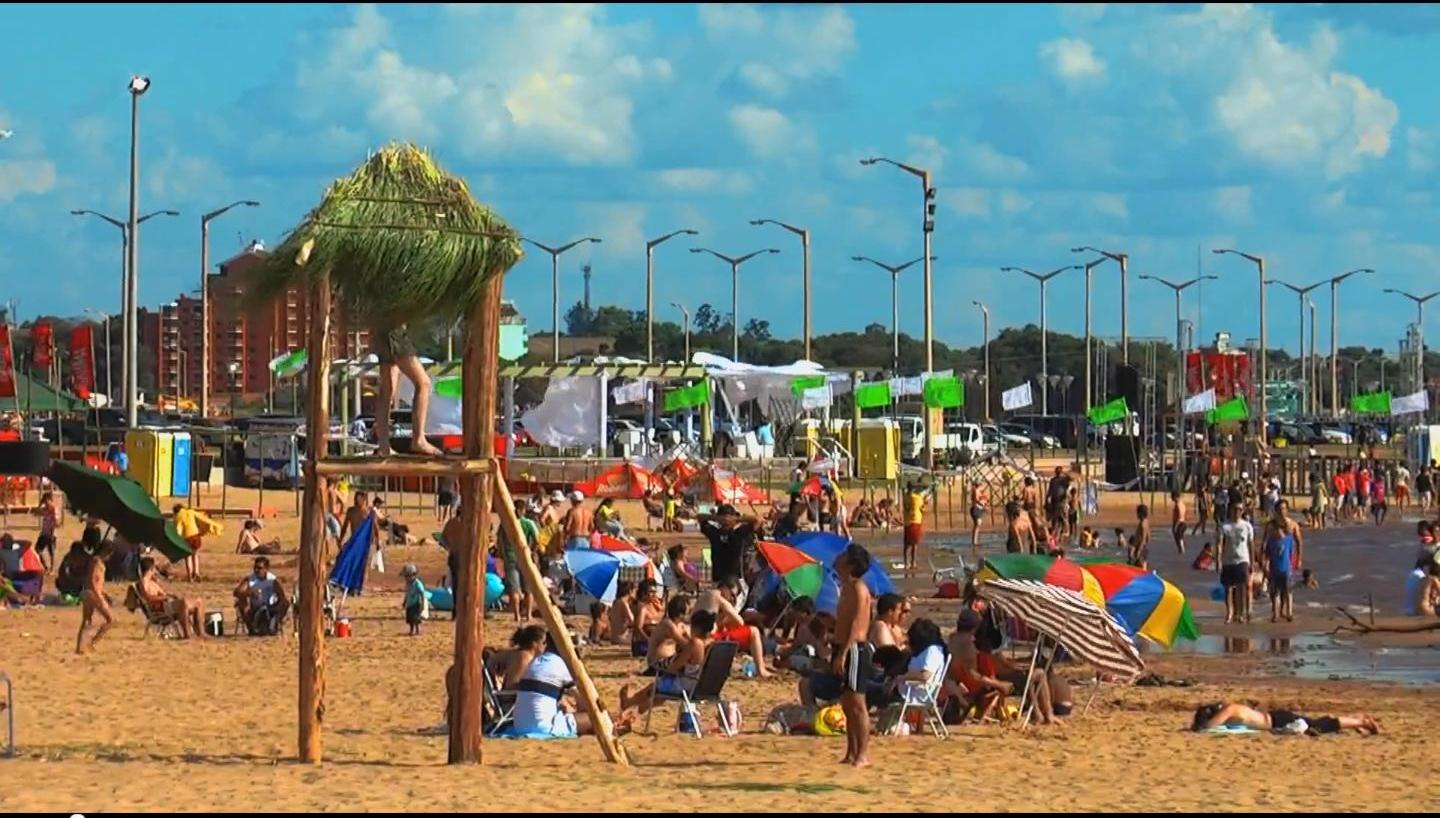
Playa San José, Encarnación, Paraguay

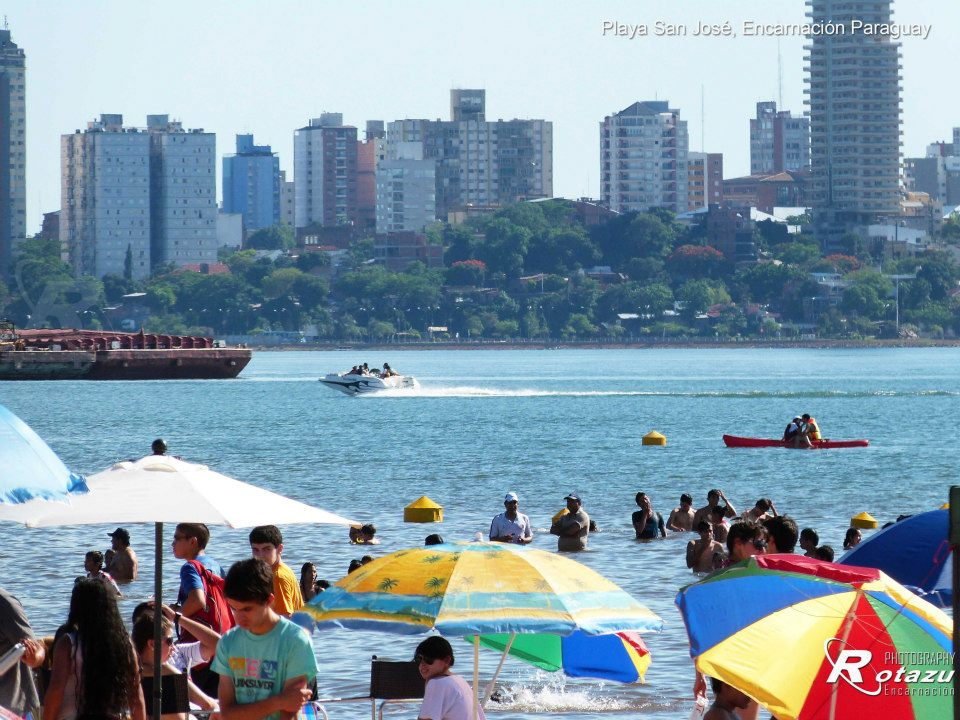
Playa San José

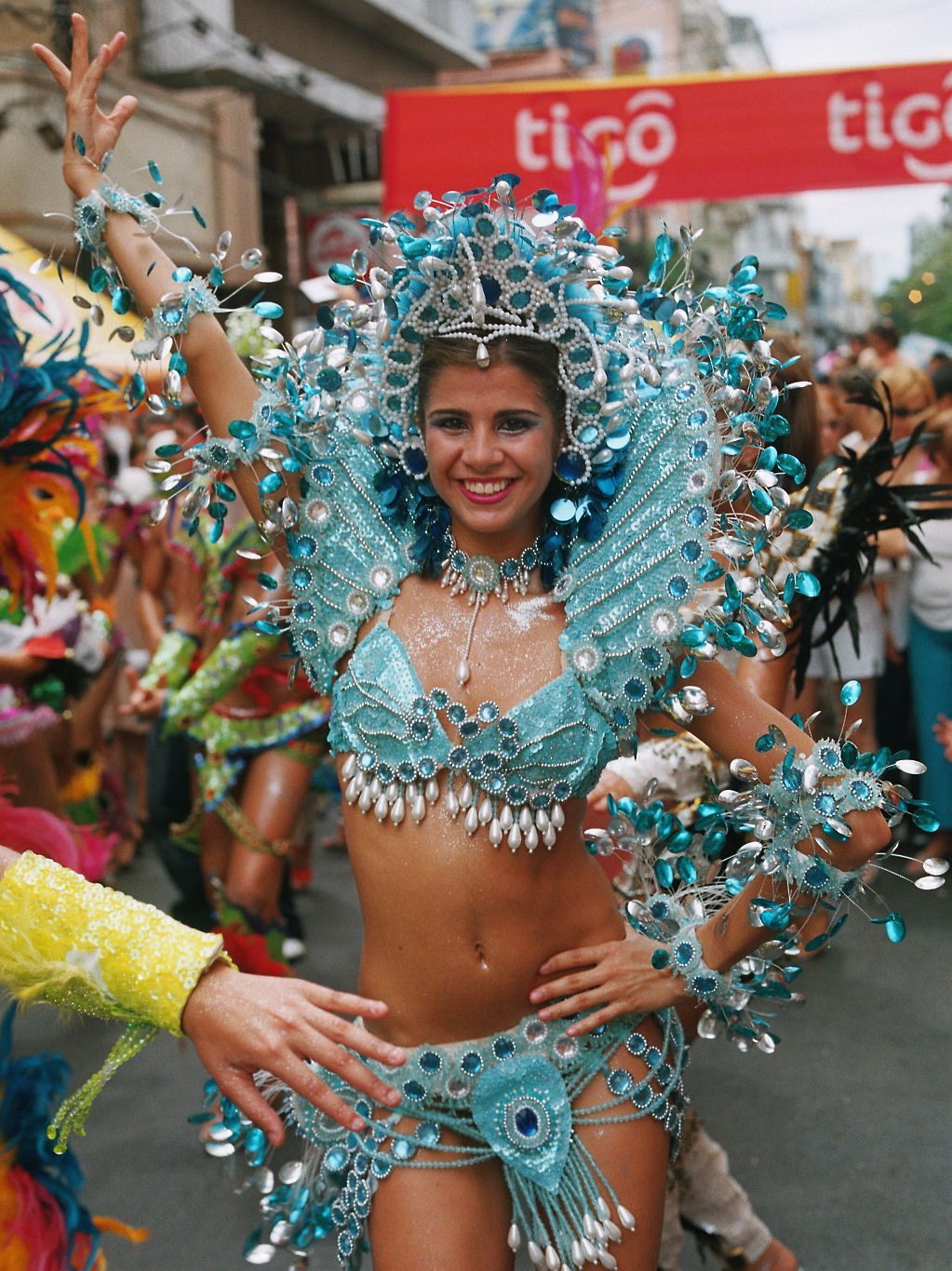
Samba dancer from Encarnación

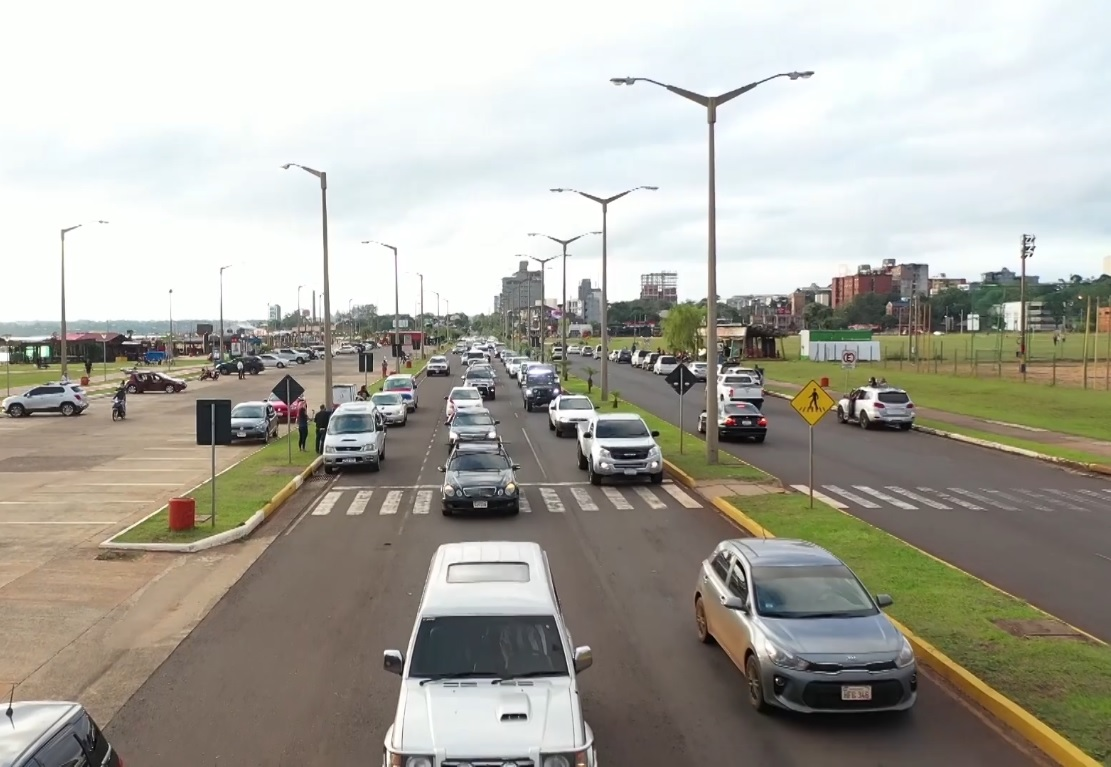
Avenida Costanera, Encarnación, Paraguay

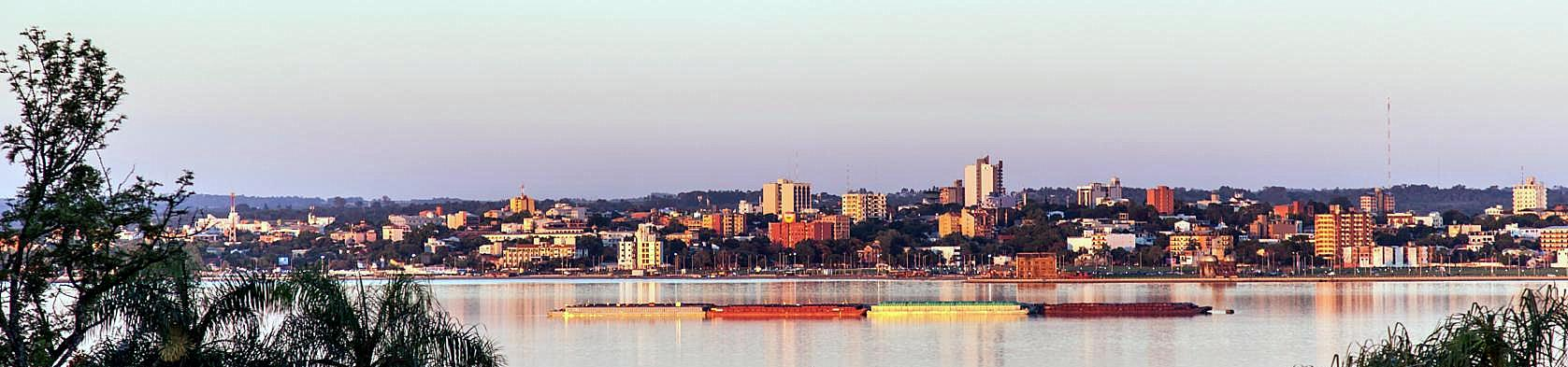
Encarnación, Paraguay

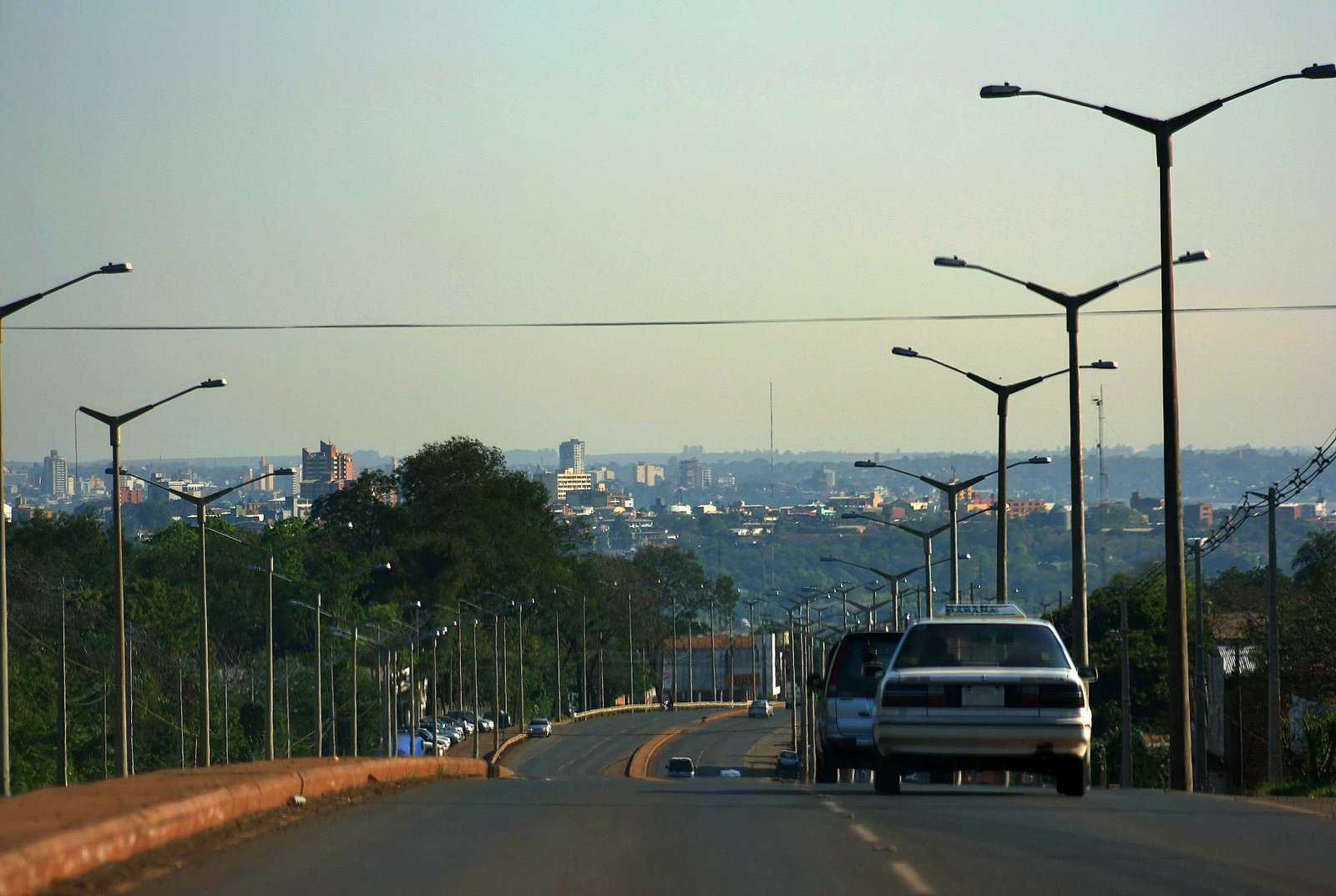
Encarnación, Paraguay

== Twin towns ==
Encarnación is twinned with:

- Corrientes, Argentina
- Paysandú, Uruguay
- Posadas, Argentina
- Punta Cana, Dominican Republic
