= Posadas, Misiones =

Posadas
- City
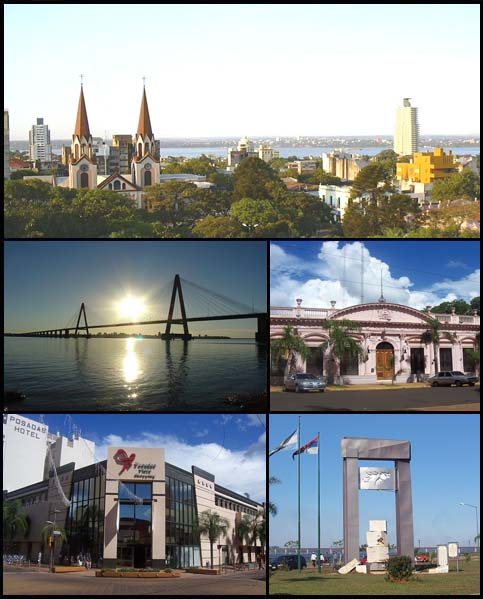
- (From top to bottom; from left to right) Panoramic view of the city; San Roque Bridge; Misiones Government House; Posadas Plaza Shopping Centre and the Malvinas Monument

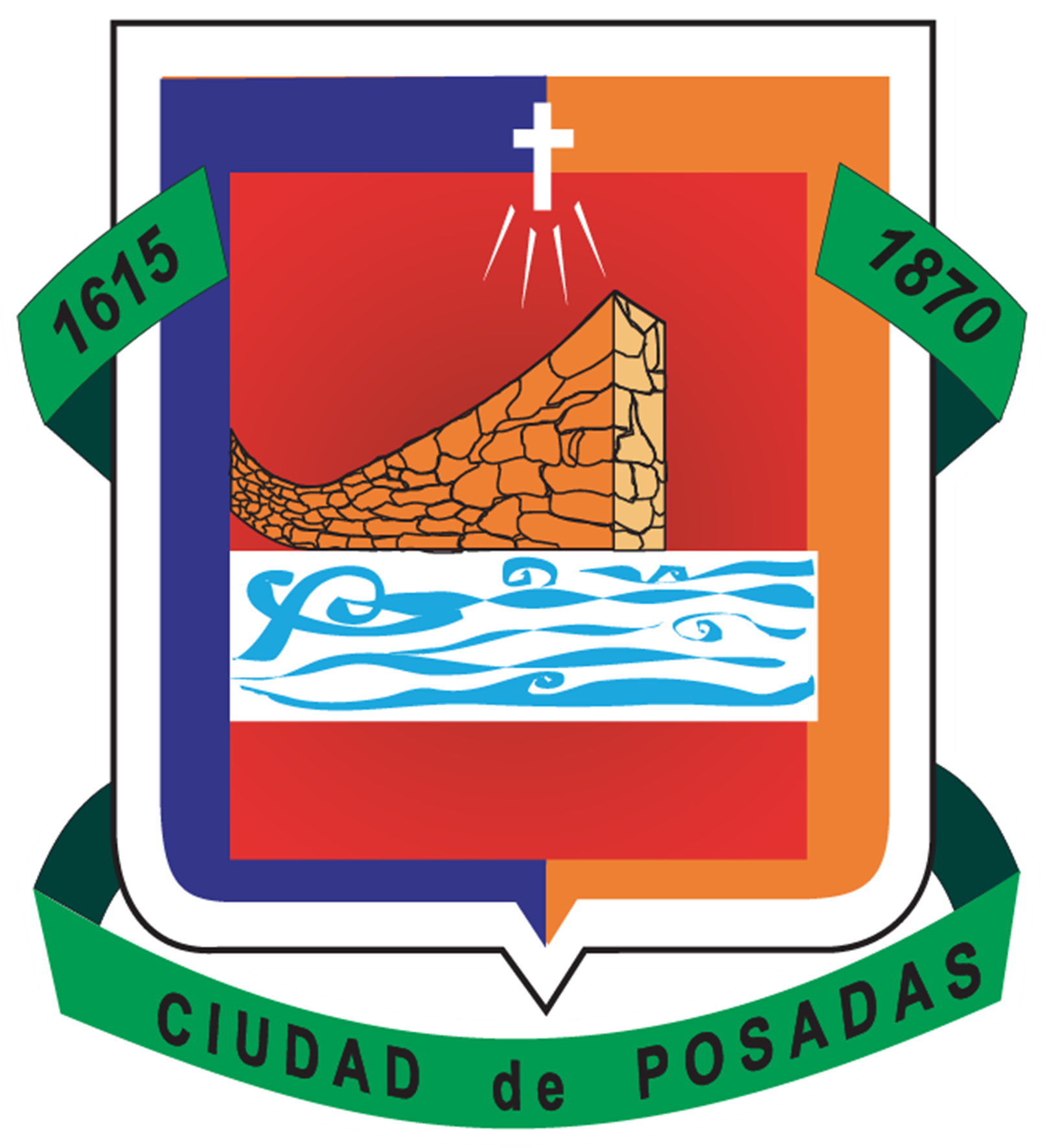
- Flag Coat of arms

- Location of Posadas in Argentina Posadas (Argentina)
- Coordinates: 27°22′S 55°54′W
- Country: Argentina
- Province: Misiones
- Department: Capital
- Founded: 1870

Government
  - Intendant: Leonardo Stelatto (Frente Renovador)
- Elevation: 120 m (390 ft)

Population (2022)
  - City: 322,554
  - Rank: 14th in Argentina (Agglomeration)
  - Urban: 389,070
  - Metro: 425,000
- Time zone: UTC−3 (ART)
- CPA base: N3300
- Dialing code: +54 376
- Website: posadas.gov.ar

Posadas (Spanish pronunciation: [poˈsaðas]) is the capital city of the Argentine province of Misiones, in its south, at the far northeast of the country on the left bank of the Paraná River, opposite Encarnación, Paraguay. The city has an area of 965 square kilometres (373 sq mi) and a population of 324,756 (2010 census [INDEC]), and the Greater Posadas area has a population of over 359,609 according to a 2017 estimate.

Posadas is the provincial centre of the government, culture and the economy. Furniture, tobacco, food, textiles and construction are its most important industries. Other important economic activities are commerce and services.

Posadas is connected to the Paraguayan city of Encarnación by the San Roque González de Santa Cruz Bridge. The port, once of great economical importance, is used for sport vessels, carrier of passengers and some boats for sand transport. The city is located on National Route 12, some 1,300 kilometres (810 mi) from Buenos Aires. The General José de San Martín Airport (IATA: PSS, ICAO: SARP), at coordinates 27°22′S 55°58′W, is seven kilometres from the city, and features regular flights to Buenos Aires.

== History ==
Father Roque González y de Santa Cruz established a town called Anunciación de Itapúa on 25 March 1615, but ten years later the settlement was moved to the other side of the Paraná River to the present location of Encarnación, Paraguay.

The first settlement was not completely abandoned, and a new San José reduction was settled there in 1628. In 1867, during the Paraguayan War, the Brazilians set up the Trinchera de San José military base there. Following the end of the war, Paraguay renounced all claims to the area, and in 1879, the town was renamed after Gervasio Antonio de Posadas, the Supreme Director of the Argentine Confederation (1814).

On 22 December 1881, the limits of the Misiones Federation were drawn, leaving Posadas within the territory of current Corrientes Province. On 30 July 1884 the National Congress decided to give Posadas to Misiones Province, and name it its capital. The National University of Misiones was established at Posadas in 1973, and in 1990, the city's cultural and economic links to Encarnación were strengthened with the completion of the San Roque González de Santa Cruz Bridge.

== Public transportation ==
The average amount of time people spend commuting with public transit in Posadas, for example to and from work, on a weekday is 57 min. 10% of public transit riders, ride for more than 2 hours every day. The average amount of time people wait at a stop or station for public transit is 16 min, while 26% of riders wait for over 20 minutes on average every day. The average distance people usually ride in a single trip with public transit is 4.3 km, while 2% travel for over 12 km in a single direction.

== Climate ==
Posadas

Climate chart (precipitation, max. and min. temperature)
J	F	M	A	M	J	J	A	S	O	N	D
166 33 22	183 32 21	145 31 20	236 27 17	179 24 14	166 21 11	131 22 11	111 24 13	143 25 14	178 29 17	190 30 19	119 33 20
- █ Average max. and min. temperatures in °C
- █ Precipitation totals in mm
- Source: Servicio Meteorológico Nacional
Imperial conversion
J	F	M	A	M	J	J	A	S	O	N	D
6.5 91 72	7.2 90 70	5.7 88 68	9.3 81 63	7 75 57	6.5 70 52	5.2 72 52	4.4 75 55	5.6 77 57	7 84 63	7.5 86 66	4.7 91 68
- █ Average max. and min. temperatures in °F
- █ Precipitation totals in inches

Posadas has a humid subtropical climate (Köppen Cfa). Summers are hot and humid with lows around 21 °C (69.8 °F), highs around 31.5 °C (88.7 °F), daily mean 26.0 °C (78.8 °F), and frequent thunderstorms. Winters are warm with lows around 12 °C (53.6 °F) and highs around 22.5 °C (72.5 °F), daily mean 17 °C (62.6 °F) . The highest temperature ever recorded was 42.1 °C (107.8 °F) and the coldest was −2.8 °C (27.0 °F).

Climate data for Posadas Airport (1991–2020, extremes 1961–present)
Month	Jan	Feb	Mar	Apr	May	Jun	Jul	Aug	Sep	Oct	Nov	Dec	Year
Record high °C (°F)	42.5 (108.5)	40.7 (105.3)	39.5 (103.1)	36.2 (97.2)	34.8 (94.6)	31.3 (88.3)	33.0 (91.4)	38.2 (100.8)	39.3 (102.7)	40.6 (105.1)	41.7 (107.1)	42.1 (107.8)	42.5 (108.5)
Mean daily maximum °C (°F)	33.0 (91.4)	32.4 (90.3)	31.0 (87.8)	28.0 (82.4)	23.9 (75.0)	22.2 (72.0)	22.0 (71.6)	24.5 (76.1)	25.9 (78.6)	28.5 (83.3)	30.4 (86.7)	32.3 (90.1)	27.8 (82.0)
Daily mean °C (°F)	27.2 (81.0)	26.5 (79.7)	25.1 (77.2)	22.3 (72.1)	18.6 (65.5)	17.1 (62.8)	16.3 (61.3)	18.2 (64.8)	20.0 (68.0)	22.6 (72.7)	24.4 (75.9)	26.5 (79.7)	22.1 (71.8)
Mean daily minimum °C (°F)	22.1 (71.8)	21.7 (71.1)	20.4 (68.7)	17.7 (63.9)	14.4 (57.9)	13.1 (55.6)	11.8 (53.2)	13.3 (55.9)	15.0 (59.0)	17.6 (63.7)	18.9 (66.0)	21.1 (70.0)	17.3 (63.1)
Record low °C (°F)	10.5 (50.9)	10.3 (50.5)	5.7 (42.3)	4.3 (39.7)	0.6 (33.1)	−1.5 (29.3)	−2.8 (27.0)	−1.8 (28.8)	1.3 (34.3)	4.8 (40.6)	6.9 (44.4)	9.6 (49.3)	−2.8 (27.0)
Average precipitation mm (inches)	168.7 (6.64)	136.9 (5.39)	171.0 (6.73)	179.0 (7.05)	138.4 (5.45)	128.6 (5.06)	94.1 (3.70)	87.1 (3.43)	132.8 (5.23)	253.4 (9.98)	178.8 (7.04)	204.4 (8.05)	1,873.2 (73.75)
Average precipitation days (≥ 0.1 mm)	9.5	9.2	9.3	8.9	8.8	8.5	8.1	7.6	9.9	11.5	8.9	9.7	110.0
Average relative humidity (%)	68.1	70.4	71.9	74.4	77.3	77.5	73.9	68.3	67.9	69.6	65.4	66.3	70.9
Mean monthly sunshine hours	192.2	186.5	179.8	174.0	155.0	126.0	158.1	179.8	147.0	153.0	183.0	176.7	2,011.1
Mean daily sunshine hours	6.2	6.6	5.8	5.8	5.0	4.2	5.1	5.8	4.9	5.1	6.1	5.7	5.5
Percentage possible sunshine	59	58	45	57	55	46	48	46	31	50	54	54	50
Source 1: Servicio Meteorológico Nacional
Source 2: UNLP (percent sun only)

== Notable people ==
- José Acasuso (born 1982), tennis player
- Germán Cano (born 1988), soccer player
- Cecilia Lueza (born 1971), artist
- Alberto Mancini (born 1969), tennis player
- Mariano Messera (born 1978), soccer player
- Daniel Vancsik (born 1977), golf player
- Lucina von der Heyde (born 1997), field hockey player

== Sports ==
The city's main football teams are: CD Guaraní Antonio Franco, Club Atlético Bartolomé Mitre (Posadas), Club Atlético Posadas and Club Deportivo Jorge Gibson Brown.

== Gallery ==
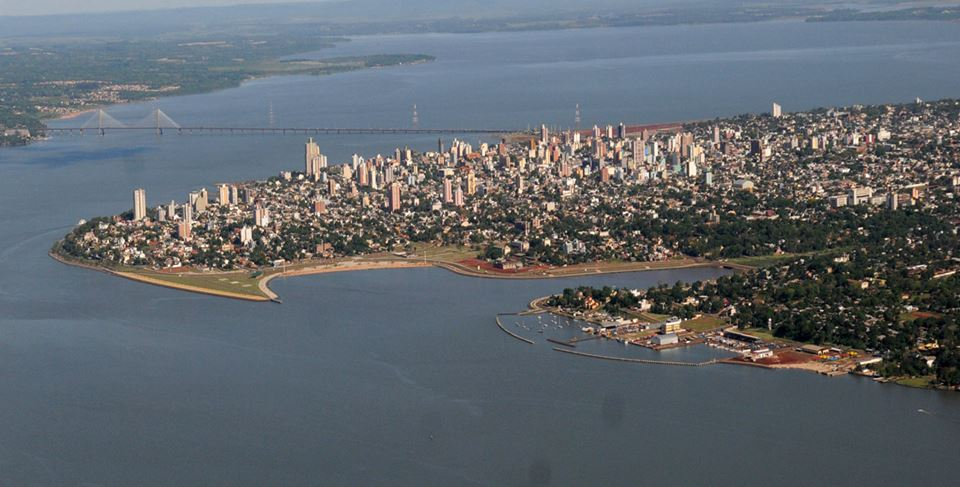
Posadas, Argentina

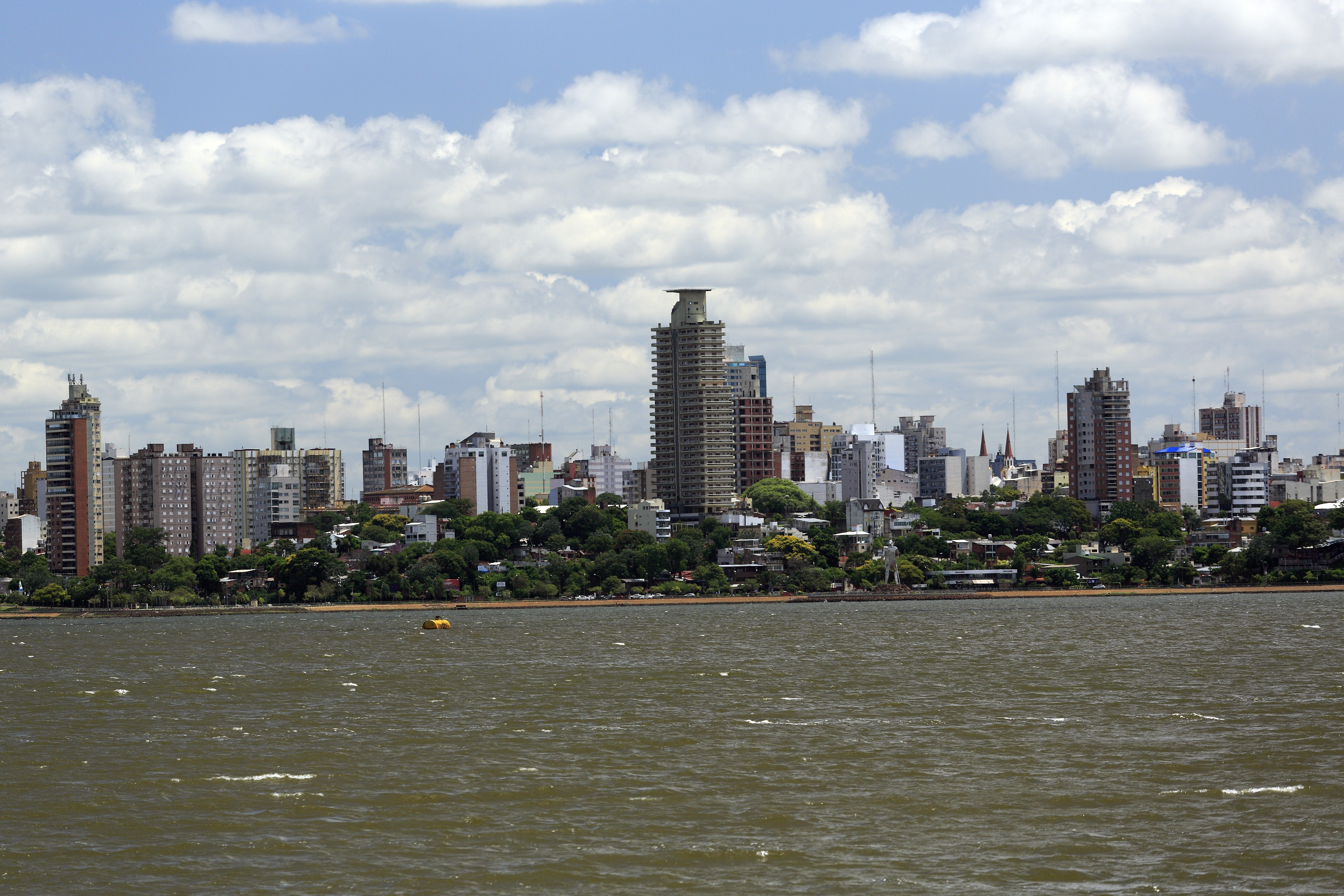
Posadas, Argentina

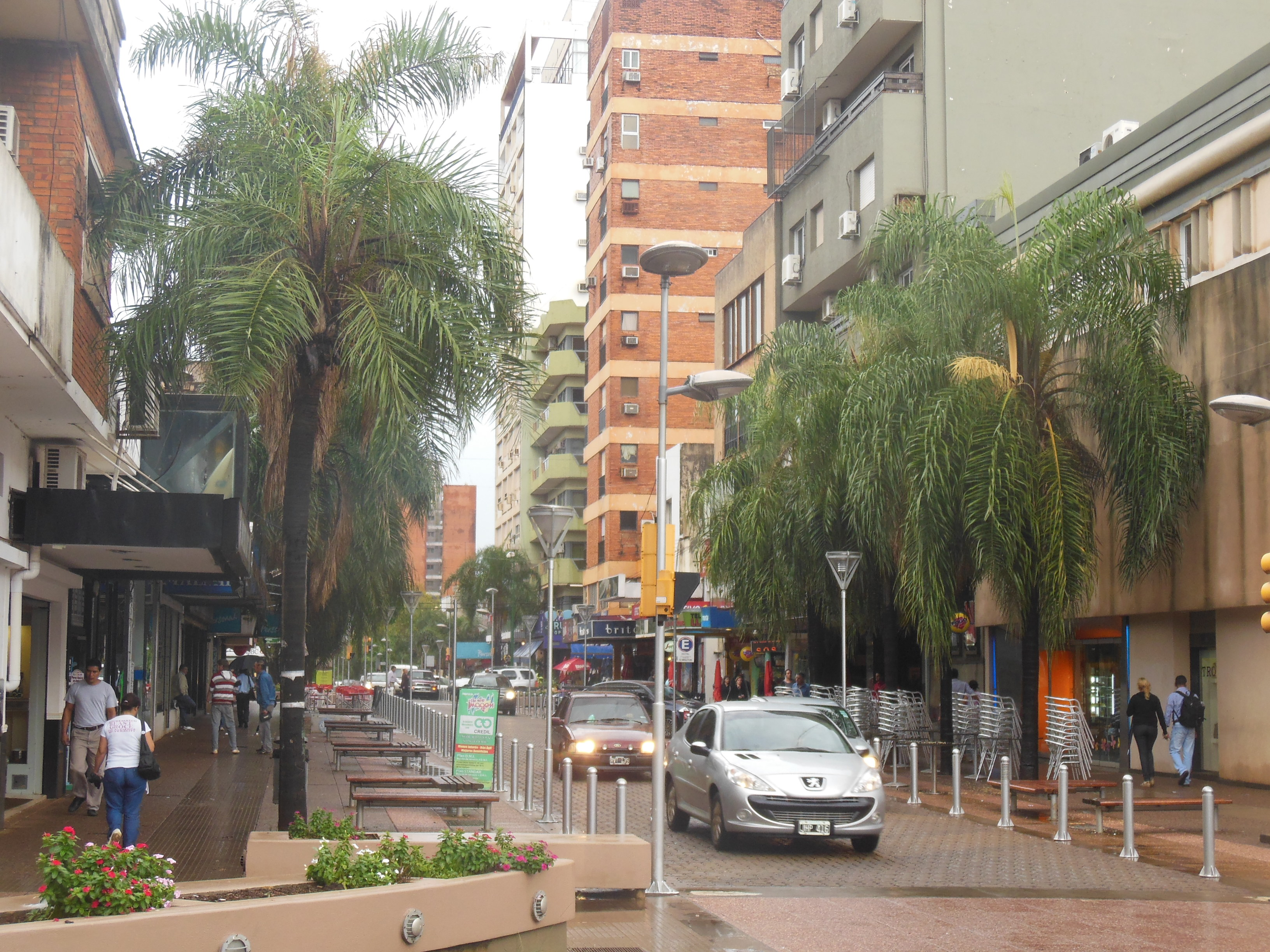
Posadas, Argentina

== Sister cities ==
- Bergamo, Italy
- Encarnación, Paraguay
