= Confederação Geral dos Trabalhadores de Angola =

Catholic Angolan trade union organization in exile

Confederação Geral dos Trabalhadores de Angola ('General Confederation of the Workers of Angola', abbreviated CGTA) was a Catholic Angolan trade union organization in exile. CGTA was founded in 1962. CGTA advocated in favour of 'trade union pluralism', and was independent of political parties.

As of 1966 Simão Laderia-Lumona was the national president of CGTA, Pedro Makumbi-Marquès the general secretary and Pedro Hilário Antonio the administrative secretary. As of 1970 CGTA had around 5,000-10,000 members.

CGTA was affiliated to the World Confederation of Labour, and received funding from the international body.

CGTA published the journal A Esperança ('The Hope').

CGTA joined hands with FNTA and UGTA in denouncing the UNTA-led coalition CUACSA, following a CUACSA statement denouncing the other Kinshasa-based unions.

The African-American Labor Center and the Union nationale des travailleurs congolais (later renamed Union nationale des travailleurs zaïrois, UNTZa) organized joint seminars and courses for organizers of CGTA and the LGTA, focusing on labour history, organizing, administration and rural cooperatives. By October 1971 some 115 Angolan exiled unionists had participated in these trainings. On September 22, 1973 CGTA merged with LGTA, forming the Central Sindical Angolana ('Angolan Trade Union Centre', CSA).
