= CSLA =

CSLA may refer to:

- California State University at Los Angeles (CSLA)
- Canadian Society of Landscape Architects / L'Association des Architectes Paysagistes du Canada (CSLA-AAPC)
- cellulose synthase-like protein family A (CslA); see cellulose synthase (UDP-forming)
- Center for the Study of Los Angeles
- Czechoslovak People's Army (ČSLA, ČLA; Slavic languages: Československá lidová armáda)
- College of Science and Liberal Arts, New Jersey Institute of Technology
- Commercial Space Launch Act
- Community Supported Living Arrangement, a type of supported living
- Component-based Scalable Logical Architecture (CSLA.NET)
- Confederação dos Sindicatos Livres de Angola (CSLA; Portuguese: Confederation of Free Trade Unions of Angola)
- Confederación Sindical Latinoamericana (CSL, CSLA; Spanish: Latin American Trade Union Confederation)
