= Uruguayan Regional Workers' Federation =

Uruguayan trade union federation

- Federación Obrera Regional Uruguaya
- Abbreviation: FORU
- Merged into: National Convention of Workers
- Formation: March 1905; 121 years ago
- Dissolved: September 1964; 62 years ago
- Type: National trade union federation
- Headquarters: Cuareim 1321, Montevideo
- Members: 90,000 (1911)
- General Secretary: Francisco Corney (1906–1911)
- Main organ: La Emancipación (1907); La Federación (1911); Solidaridad (1912; 1919–1921; 1923)
- Affiliations: International Workers' Association; American Continental Workers' Association

The Uruguayan Regional Workers' Federation (Spanish: Federación Obrera Regional Uruguaya; FORU) was a national trade union federation that operated in Uruguay during the early 20th century. Established in 1905 by several trade unions, largely made up of Italian and Spanish anarchists, the anarcho-syndicalist group quickly became the leading force in the Uruguayan labor movement. It spread throughout the country and led a number of successful strikes, but repression by the conservative government of Claudio Williman caused difficulties for industrial action, and the FORU's activities stagnated. The FORU was reorganized in 1910, following the re-election of the left-wing president José Batlle y Ordóñez, whom many in the FORU supported. In 1911, the FORU led the country's first general strike, which resulted in the promulgation of the eight-hour working day in Uruguay. With one of its main goals achieved, its activities stagnated in subsequent years, while many workers moved over to the Colorado Party and Socialist Party.

The FORU was revived in 1916 and again became the leading force in the labor movement, organizing a series of strike actions, including general strikes. But after World War I, the labor movement split into different factions and the FORU began to lose its strength. Several splinter groups, including the Committee for Workers' Unity, Uruguayan Syndicalist Union and General Confederation of Labor of Uruguay, broke away from the FORU during the 1920s. Despite the decline, the FORU participated in several international initiatives, co-founding the International Workers' Association and the American Continental Workers' Association, and positioning itself in opposition to the anti-fascists of the Spanish National Confederation of Labor. Although it survived the repression of Gabriel Terra's right-wing dictatorship, it continued to diminish in size and increasingly sought to unify with the other union federations. In 1964, it merged into the National Convention of Workers.

== Background ==
The first efforts to organize the workers' movement in Uruguay began in the 1860s and 1870s, with left-wing activists forming a Uruguayan section of the International Workingmen's Association and printing workers establishing the country's first trade union. In 1876, workers formed the Regional Federation of the Oriental Republic of Uruguay, which would form the basis for the FORU. It published the newspapers La Revolución Social in 1882, La Lucha Obrera in 1884 and La Federación de Trabajadores in 1885. Self-published newspapers grew to become something of a status symbol among Uruguayan workers' organizations.

In the 1880s and 1890s, half a million people immigrated to Uruguay, more than doubling the country's population. Many of them settled in the capital city Montevideo, where many small businesses and workshops developed, alongside a few larger companies that managed the port and on the railways. The migrant workers, most of whom came from Italy and Spain, brought with them the new political philosophy of anarchism. The radicalism of the period further intensified after people who had been expelled from Argentina for extremism found refuge in Montevideo.

By the turn of the 20th century, anarchism had gained a popular appeal among industrial workers in Uruguay, becoming the predominant tendency of left-wing politics. Syndicalism also gained traction among artisans, intellectuals and laborers alike. In the wake of the Panic of 1890, skilled workers in various trades began to organize themselves. Inspired by the model of anarcho-syndicalism, workers began organizing themselves into trade unions, which they intended to use to defend workers' interests in the short term, while building towards the ultimate goal of a social revolution against capitalism and the state. These anarchist unions functioned as a form of direct democracy, in which union representatives acted solely to coordinate between unions, without acting as a mediator between workers and employers.

== Establishment ==
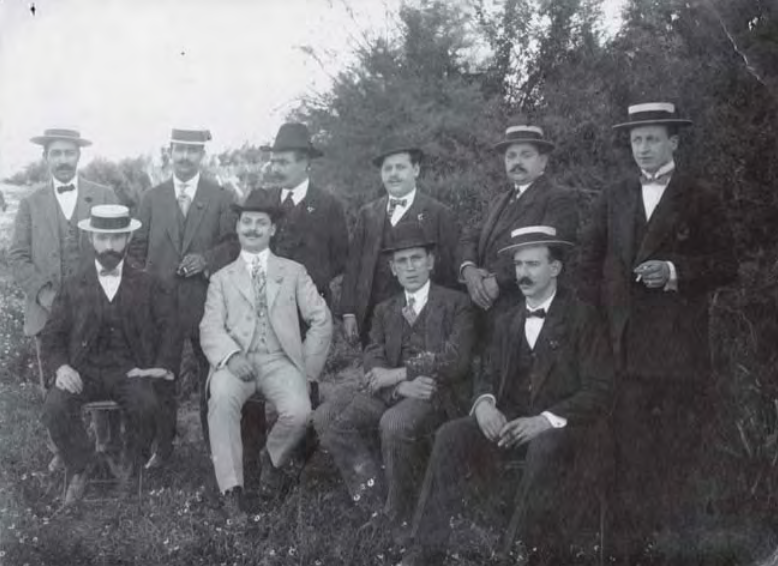
Members of the Uruguayan tailors' union, a founding section of the FORU, including the anarchist poet Ángel Falco (seated, second from right) and future Socialist Party leader Emilio Frugoni (seated, third from right)

By the early 1900s, there were 38 trade unions in Uruguay, and the growth of the workers' movement led to increased coordination between the unions. In Montevideo, among the most notable trade unions were the coal handlers', electricians' and firefighters' unions, all of which were led by anarchists. In March 1905, Uruguayan anarchist unions came together to establish a national trade union federation, which they named the Uruguayan Regional Workers' Federation (Spanish: Federación Obrera Regional Uruguaya; FORU). Many of its early membership and much of its leadership consisted of Italian and Spanish immigrant workers. Francisco Corney, an experienced Spanish trade union activist, was elected as its general secretary the following year. The FORU also began publishing a newspaper, La Emancipación, in 1907. In the paper's first issue, it declared support for workers' immediate demands for "more respect, more bread and a little more rest", while also calling for them to organize for the eventual overthrow of capitalism and the establishment of an egalitarian, post-capitalist society.

The FORU explicitly defined itself as an anarchist organization. Its stated goal was the "emancipation of the proletariat" from capitalism, through the creation of a "universal union federation". Quoting the Russian anarchist theorist Peter Kropotkin, the FORU declared that "the emancipation of the workers must be the act of the workers themselves". It discouraged its members from participating in elections or efforts to reform legislation. It also rejected state arbitration between workers and employers. It instead called on workers to express their demands through direct industrial action, including boycotts, sabotage and strikes. One of its key short-term objectives was to establish an eight-hour working day, among others that included the introduction of a minimum wage, occupational hygiene measures and rent control, and the abolition of child labor, night shifts and piece work. Although the FORU largely opposed strikes for higher wages, which it considered a reformist objective, some members considered such actions to be a "training ground" for the ultimate goal of a revolutionary general strike.

Together with the Argentine Regional Workers' Federation (FORA), the FORU was one of the only national trade union federations in Latin America to adopt a specifically anarchist orientation. Recruitment was selective, as union members were expected to be ideologically committed to the cause, for which they would form the labor movement's vanguard. Through its ideology, the FORU more closely resembled a political organization than one with a purely economic focus.

== Early activities ==
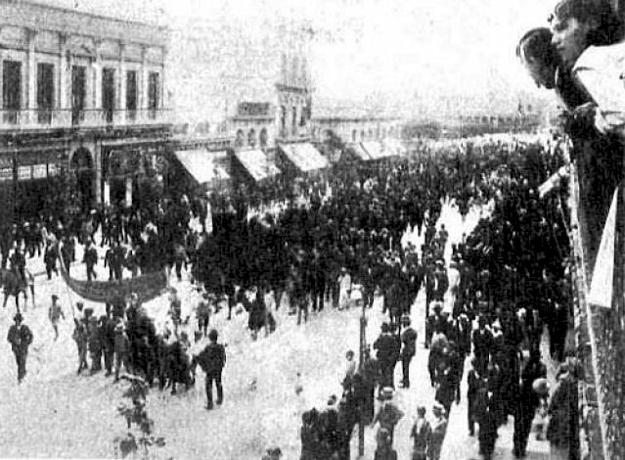
Demonstration held by the FORU in Montevideo, in 1905

After the founding of the FORU, anarchist trade unions spread throughout the country, including the cities of Colonia del Sacramento, Durazno, Florida and La Paz. Several new anarchist publications and social centres were established in Uruguay to support the anarchist labor movement. Students and teachers held public lectures and educational courses for workers, which covered subjects of interest to the unions of the FORU. International Workers' Day demonstrations were held each year, where notable anarchist writers such as Virginia Bolten and Ángel Falco gave speeches. Anarchists also agitated against militarism and parliamentarism. Strikes became much more frequent, beginning with massive walkouts by construction, maritime and railroad workers, which shut down parts of the country's infrastructure throughout 1905. Businessmen complained that ships were no longer able to drop off passengers, mail or cargo, as the port strike had effectively incapacitated the shipping industry. In early 1906, a street cleaners' strike managed to achieve victory despite the army being mobilized against them. The anarchist unions became so powerful that, in August 1907, the anarchist electricians' union won a wage increase and Sundays off without even going on strike.

However, the FORU was also sharply criticized by the anarchist newspaper El Libertario, which had not been invited to attend the FORU's founding congress; it engaged in such frequent polemics with the FORU that its shoemakers' union decided to boycott the paper. Debates also broke out about the FORU's retention of paid union secretaries, a model which they shared with the Brazilian Workers' Confederation, but which was opposed by their Argentine counterparts of the FORA. Both sides of the debate were published in La Acción Obrera, with Adrián Troitiño defending the practice due to the needs of a large-scale organization, while Marcos Filoment insisted that the practice ran counter to anarchist principles. The latter position won out, with the FORU's second congress resolving to rescind paid secretaries' speaking and voting rights in their organizations. This second congress would precede a period of decline for the FORU.

Although the FORU had encouraged abstentionism and anarchists had celebrated low turnouts in the 1907 Uruguayan parliamentary election, the appointment of the conservative Claudio Williman as president led to an increase in political repression against the labor movement. Strikes under the Williman administration were largely unsuccessful. An unsuccessful streetcar strike in 1907 led to the union collapsing. During a rail workers' strike in 1908, the union's headquarters were seized by police, and Antonio Laredo, the editor of La Acción Obrera, was imprisoned; the strike was ultimately defeated after two months and its union likewise collapsed. Between 1908 and 1910, the FORU entered into a period of stagnation. Strikes continued during this period, usually demanding higher wages or the reinstatement of dismissed workers, and most were unsuccessful. In 1908, only 3 out of 13 strikes were successful; and in 1909, none of the 9 strikes were successful. Meanwhile, the FORU's refusal to engage in party politics had enabled other left-wing tendencies to proclaim themselves the representatives of the working class, with José Batlle y Ordóñez's Colorado Party and Emilio Frugoni's nascent Socialist Party both attempting to fill the void.

== 1911 general strike ==
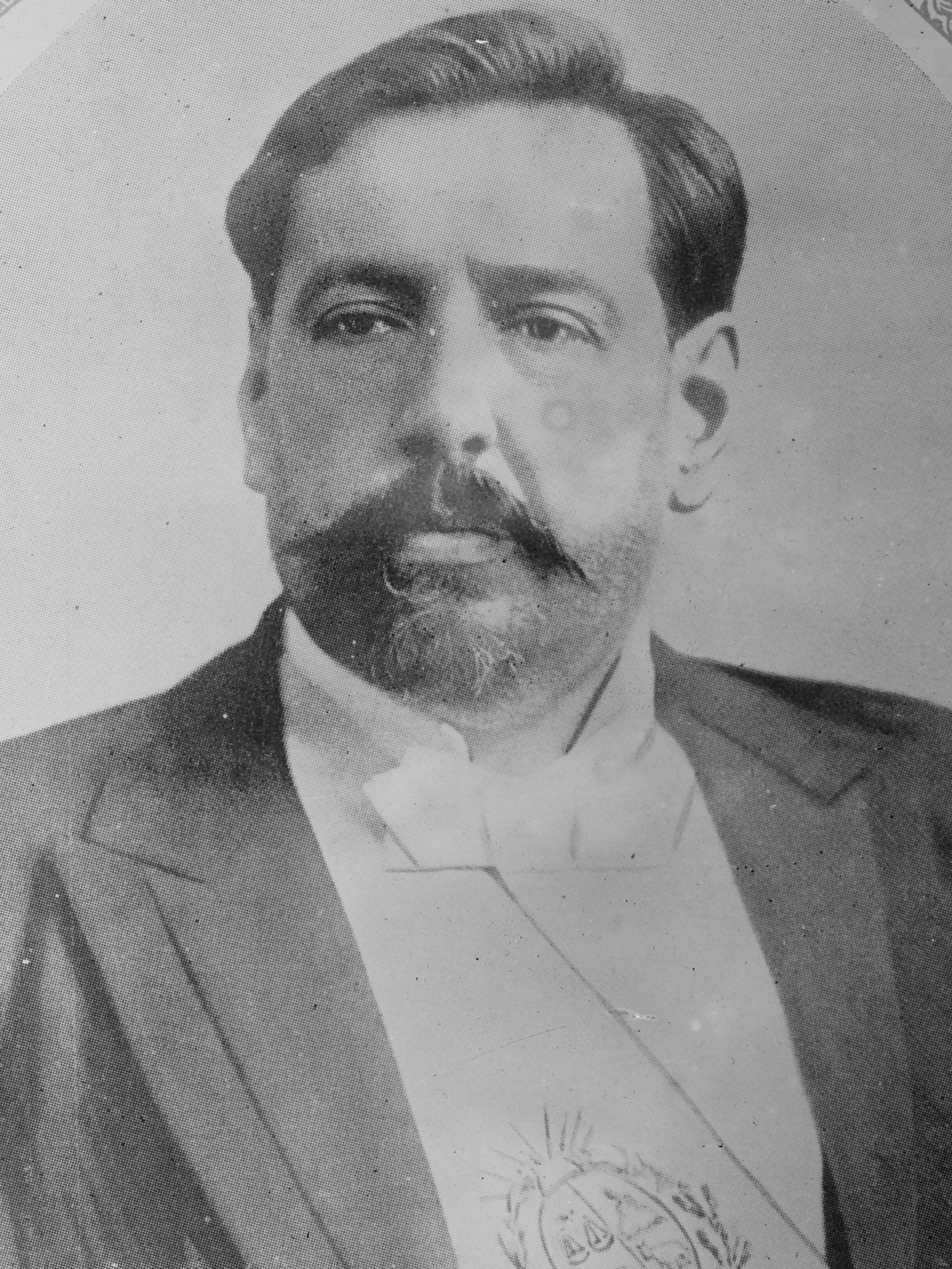
President José Batlle y Ordóñez received support from the anarchists of the FORU due to his labor reform policies

By 1910, the FORU had reorganized itself and trade union activity had again increased, with a series of strike actions by various trade unions in Montevideo. The re-election of the left-wing president José Batlle y Ordóñez in late 1910 led a radical change in the political climate for the labor movement. Strike actions in 1910 had already seen greater success, with 9 out of 13 strikes ending in victory for the workers. The year 1911 saw a massive increase in strikes, with 41 strike actions taking place, 16 of which were successful; in contrast to earlier strikes, one-third were now motivated by demands for a shorter working day, although wage increases were still the primary demand. In early 1911, the FORU truck drivers' union led a successful strike that secured them the eight-hour workday and union recognition. Walkouts also took place in Mercedes, Paysandú, Salto and San José de Mayo, and trade unions in Durango called for wage increases and working hours reductions. By this time, most industrial sectors throughout the country had their own trade unions. The unions of the FORU represented an estimated 90,000 industrial workers, out of a total of 117,000 industrial workers in the country. Historian Ángel Cappelletti called the FORU a "'true central union of workers', not by government decree or fascistic collusion, but by the will of the working class."

By the time of the FORU's third congress in May 1911, the Uruguayan anarchist movement had experienced a split, as many anarchists (known as anarcho-batllistas) came out in support of President Batlle. Anti-political anarchists of the Tiempos Nuevos group hoped that the FORU congress could reverse this trend and maintain the anarchist movement's commitment to abstentionism. At the congress, the FORU reiterated that it was an apolitical organization, opposed to all political parties and institutions, and that it sought to overthrow the state and replace it with a free association of producers. Despite some of its members' support for Batlle, the FORU would not affiliate itself with the Colorado Party. However, influenced by the Argentine Regional Workers' Confederation (CORA), which had taken a non-anarchist syndicalist orientation, the FORU congress also modified some of its founding statutes. Francisco Corney, who had defected to the Colorado Party, was ousted as general secretary and replaced by an executive committee. João Castelli was later elected as general secretary. Alongside the executive committee, which was to be appointed by each congress, the FORU also established a deliberative assembly that would consist of delegates from each union. The FORU also began publishing a new newspaper, titled La Federación.

Soon after the congress, a conflict between workers and the management of the Montevideo trolley company escalated into a strike, with the workers demanding wage increases, a reduction in working hours and the reinstatement of dismissed union organizers. The FORU immediately threw its support behind the trolley workers, carrying out a series of solidarity strikes that brought the country's economy to a standstill. On 22 May 1911, all 37 of the FORU's affiliate unions declared a general strike, the first in Uruguayan history. At the urging of the anarco-batllistas, President Batlle expressed support for the strike, which strengthened relations between the government and the trade unions. A political demonstration of 100,000 workers marched to the presidential palace, where they were welcomed by the president. There the anarchist poet Ángel Falco proclaimed that the general strike had been called by the FORU against the employers, not against the government, which had their support. Batlle responded that his government would guarantee workers' rights and support the FORU's struggle, so long as they respected law and order.

On 23 May, workers attacked a trolley that had broken the strike, and police responded by attacking the workers. Batlle also mobilized the military, deploying them to intersections throughout Montevideo. By the following day, the general strike was over. The trolley companies dismissed dozens of workers, and many more workers were also arrested and prosecuted. Under pressure from the government and the media, the FORU agreed to arbitration, hoping to secure a tactical victory. Some anarchists criticized this decision, believing it had set aside one of the FORU's main principles. Nevertheless, the FORU ultimately secured its demands for union recognition and an eight-hour day. One-third of workers in Montevideo had won an eight-hour day, while another third worked either nine- or ten-hour days, and another third still worked more than ten hours per day. It also forced the government to extend the eight-hour day to all workers; President Batlle passed the eight-hour day law in 1913, despite protests from companies, which alleged that it would lead to inflation.

== Stagnation ==
In 1912, Uruguay began experiencing a financial crisis, which caused a sharp rise in unemployment. Having already secured its main demand of an eight-hour day, the FORU's activities stagnated during this period. It briefly published a newspaper, titled Solidaridad, but its run was short-lived. In 1913, a strike by streetcar workers received support in the form of solidarity strikes by 50,000 workers affiliated with the FORU. But the streetcar workers' strike was ultimately unsuccessful and its union was effectively dissolved. The FORU then fell into a period of dormancy for the rest of the economic depression. With the Colorado Party having won the support of the working class, unions became more concerned with working conditions than social revolution, and the influence of anarcho-syndicalism declined. Although the FORU supported the reforms, they did not join Batlle's political coalition. However, some individual leaders of the labor movement were brought into the government or given positions in the Colorado Party. Immigrants also increasingly assimilated into traditional Uruguayan society, dropping their radical politics in favour of progressive reform and social advancement.

In 1915, unions representing bakers, coal handlers, linotypists, tailors and warehouse workers reorganized themselves under a committee, which the following year, re-established the FORU, together with drivers', graphic artists' and masons' unions. Several more trade unions were organized throughout Uruguay over the subsequent years, although only half of them joined the FORU. Some unions, including a union of maritime workers, were formed under the leadership of the Socialist Party, which led a successful strike at the port of Montevideo. But it was the FORU that would lead the strike movement in Uruguay between 1917 and 1921.

When packing house workers unionized and went on strike in mid-1917, the government of Feliciano Viera sided with the employers and strike breakers, and deployed the armed forces against striking workers. After clashes between the workers and soldiers, the FORU called a general strike in solidarity. The strike was ultimately unsuccessful, but the nascent packing house workers' union remained active. In August 1918, trolley workers in Montevideo called a city-wide strike strike for better working conditions, inspired by the recent success of the port workers' strike and their own experiences in the 1911 general strike. The FORU called another general strike in solidarity with the trolley workers, who were soon joined by caterers, dockworkers, linotypists, meat packers, newsagents and waste collectors. The strike escalated into an insurrection, with street fights breaking out between police and striking workers, several of whom were wounded or died in the conflict. The military was eventually brought in to quell the strike, which was brought to an end before the end of the month. Strike leaders were imprisoned and many workers either returned to work or found new jobs in other sectors. Despite the failure of the strike and heavy losses in the trolley workers' union, the union continued organizing for improvements to workplace conditions.

== Later activities ==
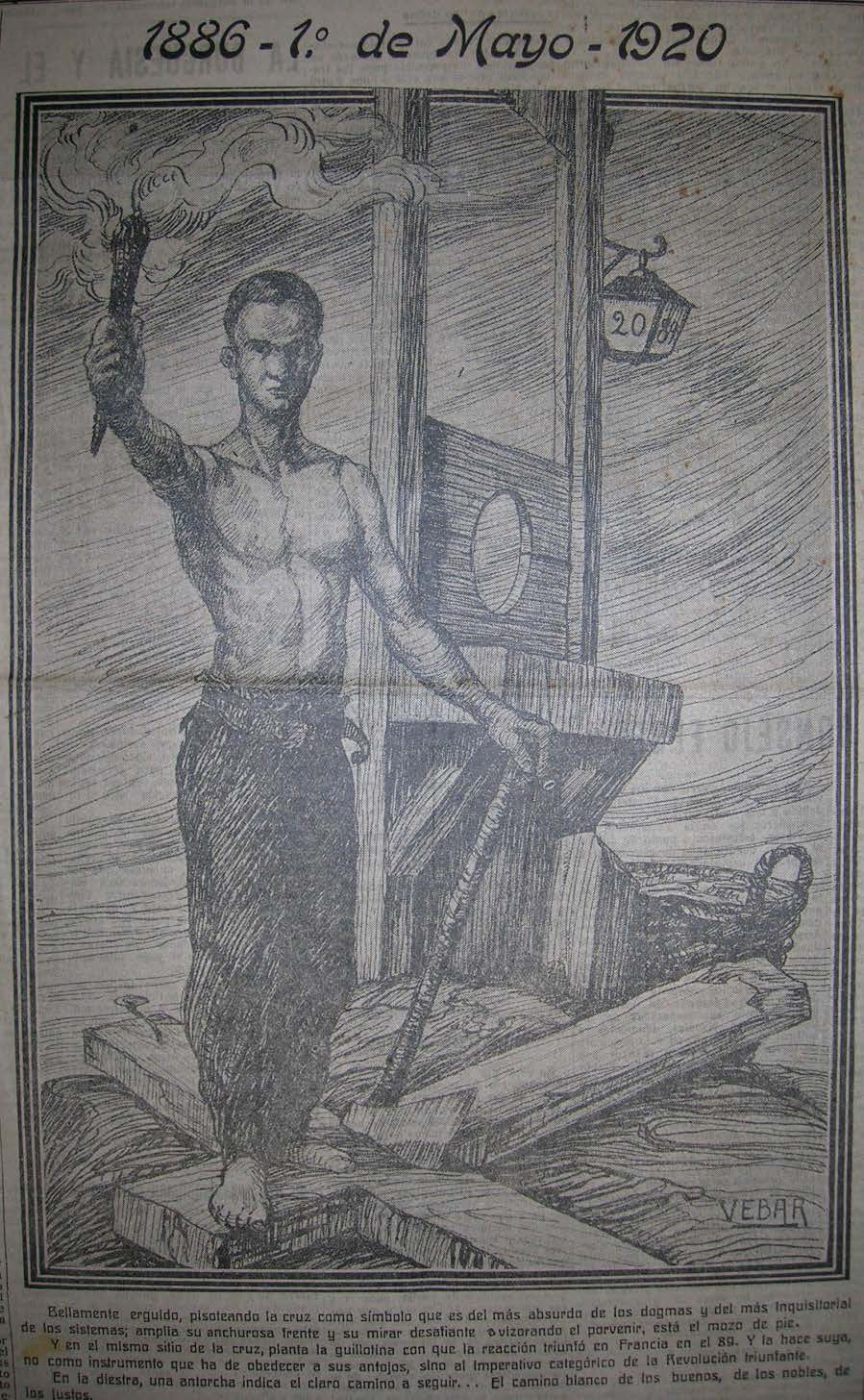
Illustration from a May 1920 issue of Solidaridad

With the end of World War I, Uruguay slipped into another economic depression, which caused a rise in unemployment and inflation. In response, a massive wave of strike actions took place, in an attempt to bring wages in line with the rising cost of living. In 1919, unions of various trades called some 69 strikes, most of which called for wage increases, and only about half of which were successful. The FORU itself supported a strike by a taxi drivers' union in Montevideo, which had been called in response to threats of arrest and extradition against a driver who had fled political repression in Argentina. And between 1919 and 1921, the FORU was able to put out a continuous run of its newspaper Solidaridad. However, the Uruguayan labor movement also split into four camps: the anarchists, syndicalists, socialists and the newly-established Communist Party. Cuban journalist Carlos Loveira reported that, although Uruguay had the strongest labor movement in Latin America, it was held back by divisions among the movement's leaders.

The FORU experienced a generalized decline throughout the 1920s, in part due to the factionalism of rank-and-file workers. The FORU soon split into anarchist, socialist and syndicalist factions. Following a failed attempt at another general strike, syndicalist members aligned with the Socialist Party broke away from the FORU and established the Committee for Workers' Unity (Spanish: Comité Pro Unidad Obrera; CPUO) in early 1922. The communist-led maritime union joined the CPUO, as the Communist Party sought to compete with the FORU for influence over the labor movement. At the time of the split, the anarchist FORU claimed to count 30,000 members and was estimated to have 105 unions. In 1923, another group of anarcho-syndicalist unions broke away from the FORU and united with communist-aligned unions to form the Uruguayan Syndicalist Union (Spanish: Unión Sindical Uruguaya; USU). The FORU briefly revived its newspaper Solidaridad in 1923, before it was forced to shut down again.

At this time, the FORU began developing its international links with other trade union federations. The FORU attempted to send a delegate to the second world congress of the Red International of Labor Unions (RILU), but they were not permitted to attend. The FORU would sign a dissenting statement to the congress, protesting the RILU's policy of working within reformist unions, and raised a call for an international of revolutionary syndicalist organizations. Although its delegate had arrived too late to participate in the founding congress of the International Workers' Association (IWA), the FORU formally affiliated itself with the organization in 1924. In 1926, Uruguayan anarchist maritime workers hosted an international conference of maritime workers in Montevideo. The FORU also participated in the establishment of the American Continental Workers' Association (ACAT) in 1929, although it was represented at its founding congress by a Brazilian delegate. At the third congress of the IWA in Madrid, the FORU objected to Pierre Besnard's calls for the rationalization of the industrial economy under syndicalism. Later, the Mexican trade unionist Vicente Lombardo Toledano invited the FORU to participate in a continental congress, which would establish a Latin American Workers' Confederation (CTAL). Following the outbreak of the Spanish Civil War, the FORU denounced the Spanish National Confederation of Labor (CNT) for joining the anti-fascist faction. Delegates of the FORU would be unable to attend future conferences of the IWA, which fell under the dominance of the CNT. Following the outbreak of World War II, the FORU denounced both sides of the war for fighting in the interests of capital, and took up the slogan "Neither Fascism, nor Antifascism".

== Decline and dissolution ==
By 1927, the FORU's membership had declined to 7,000. By 1928, the FORU counted 14 unions, with 2,240 members between them; and by 1930, this number had declined to 12 unions. Only one, the drivers' union, was still active and well-organized. The FORU nevertheless continued to hold a leading influence within the labor movement, with even the Communist Party recognizing anarchist predominance. The Communist Party built ties with both the FORU and the USU during this period. Attempts were made by the FORU and USU to unify the divided labor movement, but they were unsuccessful. On the contrary, another split took place in 1929, with communists breaking away from the FORU and USU and forming the General Confederation of Labor of Uruguay (CGTU). By the beginning of the Great Depression, the labor movement was split between three union federations and had greatly diminished in strength. When president Gabriel Terra established a right-wing dictatorship in 1933, the labor movement was too divided and weak to meaningfully oppose it. The FORU was able to survive the repression by the Terra dictatorship, but its membership continued to decline. The FORU was one of only a few Latin American anarcho-syndicalist organizations, along with the Chilean General Confederation of Workers and Bolivian Local Workers' Federation, that survived the political repression of the 1930s.

After the fall of the Terrist dictatorship in 1943, a new political regime oversaw a return to state mediation between workers and employers, which included the establishment of new works councils. This resulted in the revival of the trade union movement, which saw large increases in membership, although these new unions were much more passive and cooperative than their more combative predecessors of previous decades. Most of these new unions united into the communist-aligned General Workers' Union (UGT). Under the leadership of Rodney Arismendi, the UGT moved away from the FORU's practice of direct action and instead sought to negotiate with the state, as Arismendi believed workers could carry out a social revolution by taking power through the framework of liberal democracy. Meanwhile, the FORU continued to shrink in size; by 1946, it had declined to only three unions, representing bakers, mechanics and heating fixture workers. Some young anarchists joined the Federation of University Students of Uruguay (FEEU), which they attempted to connect to the waning anarchist labor movement.

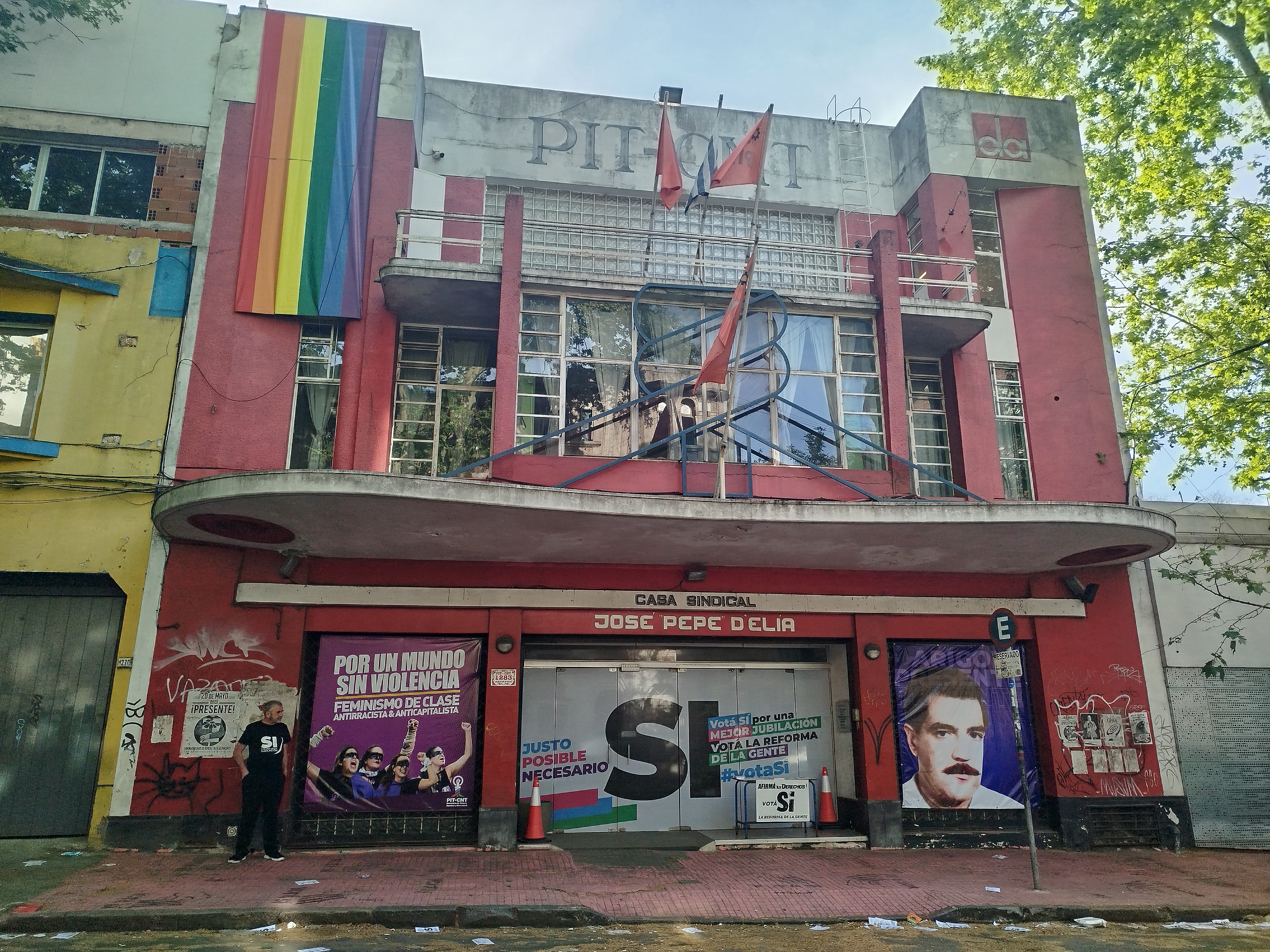
Headquarters of the National Convention of Workers (CNT) during the 2024 Uruguayan constitutional referendum

By the time a new collegiate regime was established in the early 1950s, there were three main tendencies in the labor movement: the autonomists and anarcho-syndicalists of the FORU, the centralists of the UGT and the company unions. Growing trade union opposition to the new ruling National Council of Government spurred another attempt at unifying the labor movement. The FORU, USU, UGT and CSU ultimately decided to merge together into a new trade union federation. In 1964, most remaining Uruguayan unions, including the FORU, united into the National Convention of Workers (CNT), within which Uruguayan anarchists continued to promote their ideas. Anarchists of the FORU would continue publishing Solidaridad until 1970. Other anarchists who had broken away from the FORU, including those around the Voluntad newspaper, came together with radical student groups of the FEEU to establish the Uruguayan Anarchist Federation (FAU). The CNT traced its origins back to the founding of the FORU in 1905, when it became the country's first national trade union federation. The FAU also drew inspiration from the FORU's ability to coordinate trade unions into a single organization, but was critical of its anarcho-syndicalist orientation, which it believed had made it unable to rebuild itself after being repressed by the dictatorship.

== See also ==
- Anarchism in Uruguay
- List of trade unions in Uruguay
- Simón Radowitzky – Ukrainian-Argentine anarchist (1891–1956)

== Bibliography ==
- Alexander, Robert J. (2005). "The First Half Century of Uruguayan Organized Labor". A History of Organized Labor in Uruguay and Paraguay. Parker, Eldon M. Westport, Connecticut: Praeger Publishers. pp. 7–40. ISBN 978-0-275-97745-0.
- Alexander, Robert J.; Parker, Eldon M. (2009). "Anarchosyndicalist Unions and ACAT". International Labor Organizations and Organized Labor in Latin America and the Caribbean: A History. ABC-Clio. pp. 1–10. ISBN 978-0-275-97739-9.
- Araiza Kokinis, Troy Andreas (2023a). Anarchist Popular Power: Dissident Labor and Armed Struggle in Uruguay, 1956–76. AK Press. ISBN 9781849355001.
- Araiza Kokinis, Troy Andreas (2023b). "An Anarchy for The South: Third Worldism, Popular Power, and the Uruguayan Anarchist Federation, 1956–1976". In Cameselle-Pesce, Pedro; Sharnak, Debbie (eds.). Uruguay in Transnational Perspective. Routledge. pp. 307–331. doi:10.4324/9781003271413-20. ISBN 978-1-032-22169-4.
- Bogliaccini, Juan Ariel (2012). Small latecomers into the global market power conflict and institutional change in Chile and Uruguay (PhD). The University of North Carolina at Chapel Hill. ProQuest 3512594.
- Buchanan, Paul G. (2008). "Preauthoritarian Institutions and Postauthoritarian Outcomes: Labor Politics in Chile and Uruguay". Latin American Politics and Society. 50 (1): 59–89. doi:10.1111/j.1548-2456.2008.00004.x.
- Busch, Gary K. (1983). The Political Role of International Trades Unions. Macmillan. ISBN 978-1-349-05581-4.
- Caetano, Gerardo (1997). "Political Culture, Parties and Electors in Uruguay: the Experience of the Second Constitution, 1919-1933". In Devoto, Fernando; Di Tella, Torcuato S. (eds.). Political Culture, Social Movements and Democratic Transitions in South America in the XXth Century. Vol. 32. pp. 209–244. ISBN 88-0799053-9.
- Cappelletti, Ángel J. (2017). "Uruguay". Anarchism in Latin America. AK Press. ISBN 9781849352833.
- da Cruz, Martin (2022). From Beauty to Duty: A Footballing History of Uruguay, 1878-1917. Pitch Publishing. ISBN 9781801501491.
- Damier, Vadim (2009) [2000]. Anarcho-syndicalism in the 20th Century. Translated by Archibald, Malcolm. Edmonton: Black Cat Press. ISBN 978-0-9737827-6-9.
- Finch, M. H. J. (1981). "The Working Class Movement". A Political Economy of Uruguay since 1870. Springer. pp. 53–62. ISBN 978-1-349-16625-1.
- Flores, Matias G.; Colacci, Romina; Cano, Agustín (2023). "Critical community engagement and the Latin American ethos: contributions to a Global South dialogue". African Journal of Higher Education Community Engagement. 1 (1): 64–82. doi:10.21504/ajhece.v1i1.2473.
- Herrera, Pedro (2025). "Continental Worker Unity, 1935–1938". A Transnational History of the Latin American Workers’ Confederation, 1938–1963. Labour in History and Society. Palgrave Macmillan. doi:10.1007/978-3-031-98447-1_2. ISBN 978-3-031-98447-1.
- Lawson, Tommy (10 January 2022). ""An Organisation of Militants" The Federación Anarquista Uruguaya". Red & Black Notes.
- Madrid, Raúl L. (2019). "Opposition Parties and the Origins of Democracy in Latin America". Comparative Politics. 51 (2): 157–175. JSTOR 26563453.
- Massó, Mariana; Quiroga, Manuel (2022). "Building a Continental Policy: The South American Secretariat of the Communist International (1925–34)". Historical Materialism. 30 (3): 236–272. doi:10.1163/1569206X-20222052. ISSN 1569-206X.
- O'Neill Cuesta, Fernando (2020). Direct Action in Montevideo: Uruguayan Anarchism, 1927–1937. AK Press. ISBN 9781849353199.
- Peterson, Lars (2014). In The Shadow Of Batlle: Workers, State Officials, And The Creation Of The Welfare State In Uruguay, 1900-1916 (PhD). University of Pittsburgh. ProQuest 3582602.
- Peterson, Lars (2015). "From Anarchists to "Anarcho-Batllistas": Populism and Labor Legislation in Uruguay". In de Laforcade, Geoffroy; Shaffer, Kirwin (eds.). In Defiance of Boundaries: Anarchism in Latin America. University Press of Florida. pp. 117–141. ISBN 978-0-8130-6110-8.
- Rosenthal, Anton (1995). "The Arrival of the Electric Streetcar and the Conflict over Progress in Early Twentieth-Century Montevideo". Journal of Latin American Studies. 27 (2): 319–341. JSTOR 158117.
- Rosenthal, Anton (1998). "Dangerous Streets: Trolleys, Labor Conflict, and the Reorganization of Public Space in Montevideo, Uruguay". In Pineo, Ronn; Baer, James A. (eds.). Cities Of Hope. Westview Press. pp. 30–52. doi:10.4324/9780429501647-3. ISBN 0-8133-2443-2.
- Rosenthal, Anton (2015). "Moving between the Global and the Local: The Industrial Workers of the World and Their Press in Latin America". In de Laforcade, Geoffroy; Shaffer, Kirwin (eds.). In Defiance of Boundaries: Anarchism in Latin America. University Press of Florida. pp. 72–94. ISBN 978-0-8130-6110-8.
- Schlueter, Andre (2014). "The Golden Age of the Two Settler Economies". Institutions and Small Settler Economies. Palgrave Macmillan. pp. 57–108. doi:10.1057/9781137445674_3.
- Sharkey, Paul, ed. (2009). The Federacion Anarquista Uruguaya (FAU): Crisis, Armed Struggle and Dictatorship, 1967-1985. Kate Sharpley Library. ISBN 9781873605691.
- Thorpe, Wayne (1989). The Workers Themselves. Kluwer Academic Publishers. ISBN 0-7923-0276-1. LCCN 89-8205.
- Toledo, Edilene; Biondi, Luigi (8 October 2014). "Anarchism (Latin America)". In Daniel, Ute; Gatrell, Peter; Janz, Oliver; Jones, Heather; Keene, Jennifer D.; Kramer, Alan; Nasson, Bill (eds.). 1914-1918-online. International Encyclopedia of the First World War. Freie Universität Berlin. doi:10.15463/ie1418.10377.
- van der Walt, Lucien; Schmidt, Michael (2009). Black Flame: The Revolutionary Class Politics of Anarchism and Syndicalism. Edinburgh: AK Press. ISBN 978-1-904859-16-1. LCCN 2006933558. OCLC 1100238201.
- Weiss, Holger (2021). A Global Radical Waterfront: The International Propaganda Committee of Transport Workers and the International of Seamen and Harbour Workers, 1921-1937 (PDF). Brill. doi:10.1163/9789004463288. ISBN 978-90-04-46291-5.
