= Anarcho-syndicalism =

Anarchist organisational model for trade unions

Anarcho-syndicalism is an anarchist organisational model that centres trade unions as a vehicle for class conflict. Drawing from the theory of libertarian socialism and the practice of syndicalism, anarcho-syndicalism sees trade unions as both a means to achieve immediate improvements to working conditions and to build towards a social revolution in the form of a general strike with the ultimate aim of abolishing the state and capitalism. Anarcho-syndicalists consider trade unions to be the prefiguration of a post-capitalist society, and seek to use them in order to establish workers' control of production and distribution. An anti-political ideology, anarcho-syndicalism rejects political parties and participation in parliamentary politics, considering them to be a corrupting influence on the labour movement. In order to achieve their material and economic goals, anarcho-syndicalists instead practice direct action in the form of strike actions, boycotts and sabotage. Anarcho-syndicalists also attempt to build solidarity among the working class in order to unite workers against the exploitation of labour and build workers' self-management.

The foundations of anarcho-syndicalism were laid by the anti-authoritarian faction of the International Workingmen's Association (IWMA) and developed by the French General Confederation of Labour (CGT). Anarcho-syndicalism was constituted as a specific tendency following the International Anarchist Congress of Amsterdam in 1907, which led to anarcho-syndicalism becoming the dominant form of trade union organisation in Europe and Latin America. After facing suppression during the Revolutions of 1917–1923, anarcho-syndicalists established the International Workers' Association (IWA) in 1922. Anarcho-syndicalism reached its apex during the Spanish Revolution of 1936, when the National Confederation of Labour (CNT) established an anarcho-syndicalist economy throughout much of the Spanish Republic. Anarcho-syndicalism went into decline after the defeat of the anarchists in the Spanish Civil War in 1939. The movement split into two factions: the "orthodox" faction, which held to traditional syndicalist principles in spite of changing material conditions; and the "revisionist" faction, which aimed to achieve a mass base and work within the framework of newly established welfare states. By the end of the 20th century, the rise of neoliberalism and the collapse of the Eastern Bloc had led to a revival in anarcho-syndicalism, with syndicalist unions once again being established throughout the globe.

== History ==
=== Origins ===
The history of anarcho-syndicalism can be traced back to the anarchist faction of the International Workingmen's Association (IWA), which called for trade unions to overthrow the state in a general strike. This syndicalist model of trade union organisation was adopted by anarchists in Spain, Cuba, Mexico and the United States, where syndicalism became the dominant organisational form. Elsewhere, the development of reformist tendencies such as social democracy sidelined anarchists within trade unions. But tensions between rank-and-file trade unionists and their social-democratic leadership eventually gave way to the development of revolutionary syndicalism, which called for workers themselves to take direct action in order to improve their own material conditions.

=== Growth of syndicalism ===
A women's convention at the Bourse du Travail in Troyes, c. 1900

Revolutionary syndicalism was first propagated in France, where the Bourses du Travail (English: Labour Exchanges) were established to provide mutual aid to workers and organise strike actions. By the 20th century, the bourses had joined to establish the General Confederation of Labour (CGT), which rose to include 60% of French workers within its ranks. But after the CGT launched a general strike, which won French workers the eight-hour day and the weekend, the union turned away from revolutionary syndicalism towards reformism. However, by this time, revolutionary syndicalism had already spread throughout Europe, with syndicalist unions being established in the Netherlands, Italy, Portugal, Germany and Sweden. The concurrent development of industrial unionism led to the establishment of the Industrial Workers of the World (IWW) in countries throughout the English-speaking world. By the 1910s, syndicalism had spread throughout every country in Europe and anarchist tendencies started to develop within the movement.

=== Development of anarcho-syndicalism ===
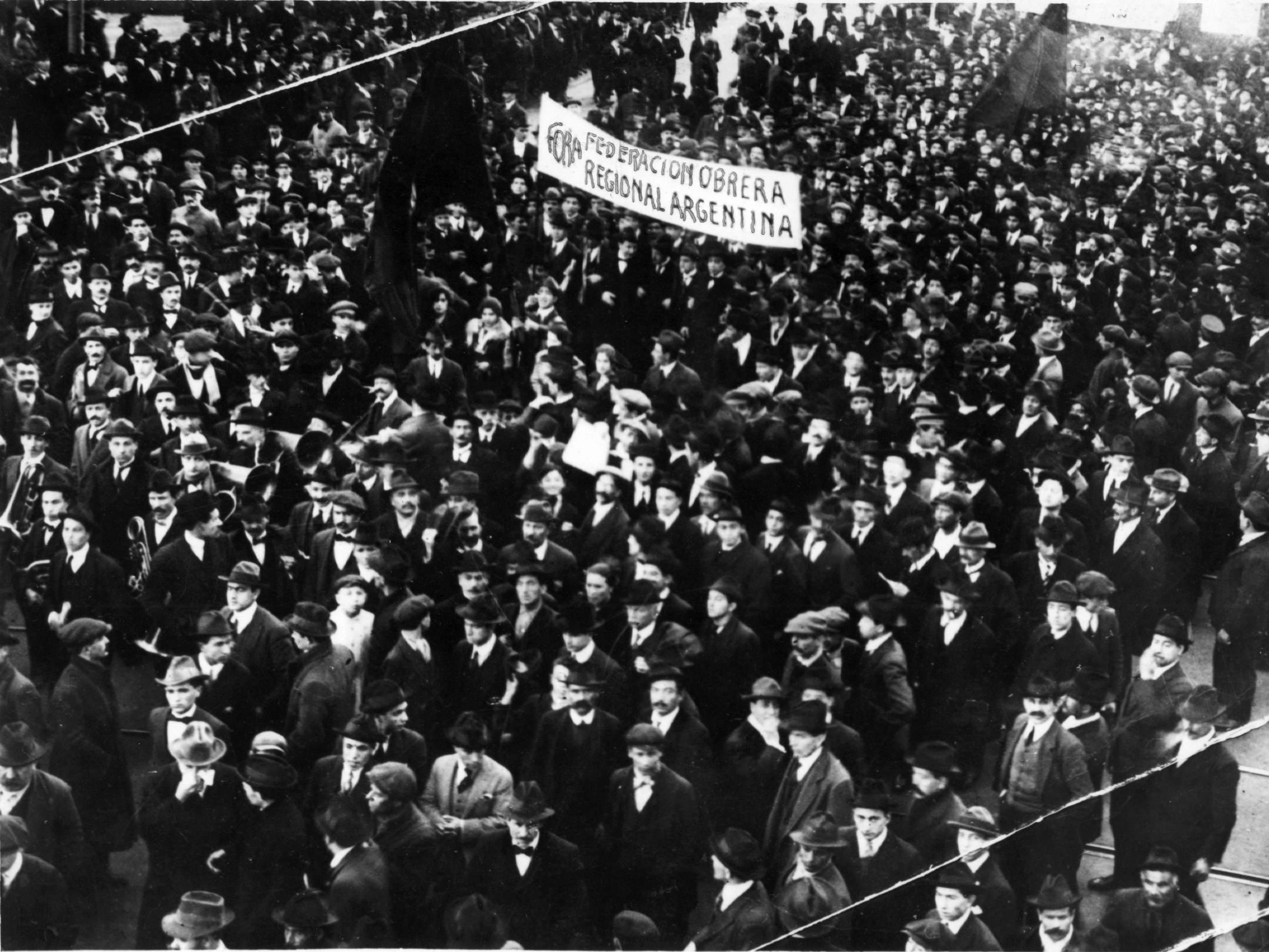
Demonstration by the Argentine Regional Workers' Federation (FORA) in 1915

Although anarchists widely participated in the syndicalist movement, syndicalists were divided into separate tendencies, many of which rejected the ideological prescriptions of anarchism. At the International Anarchist Congress of Amsterdam, convened by the anarcho-syndicalist Christiaan Cornelissen in 1907, a conflict between the two tendencies broke out; while the syndicalist Pierre Monatte and the anarchist Errico Malatesta debated their respective ideologies, Amédée Dunois attempted to synthesise the two into a "workers' anarchism". Anarcho-syndicalism soon became the dominant form of trade union organisation in Spain, Argentina, Brazil, Mexico, Paraguay, Uruguay and many other Latin American countries, where anarcho-syndicalists organised a series of general strikes for the eight-hour day. Attempts to establish international links between these anarcho-syndicalist organisations culminated in the convocation of a revolutionary syndicalist congress in 1913, although further movements towards the creation of an international organisation were halted by the outbreak of world war.

=== War and Revolution ===
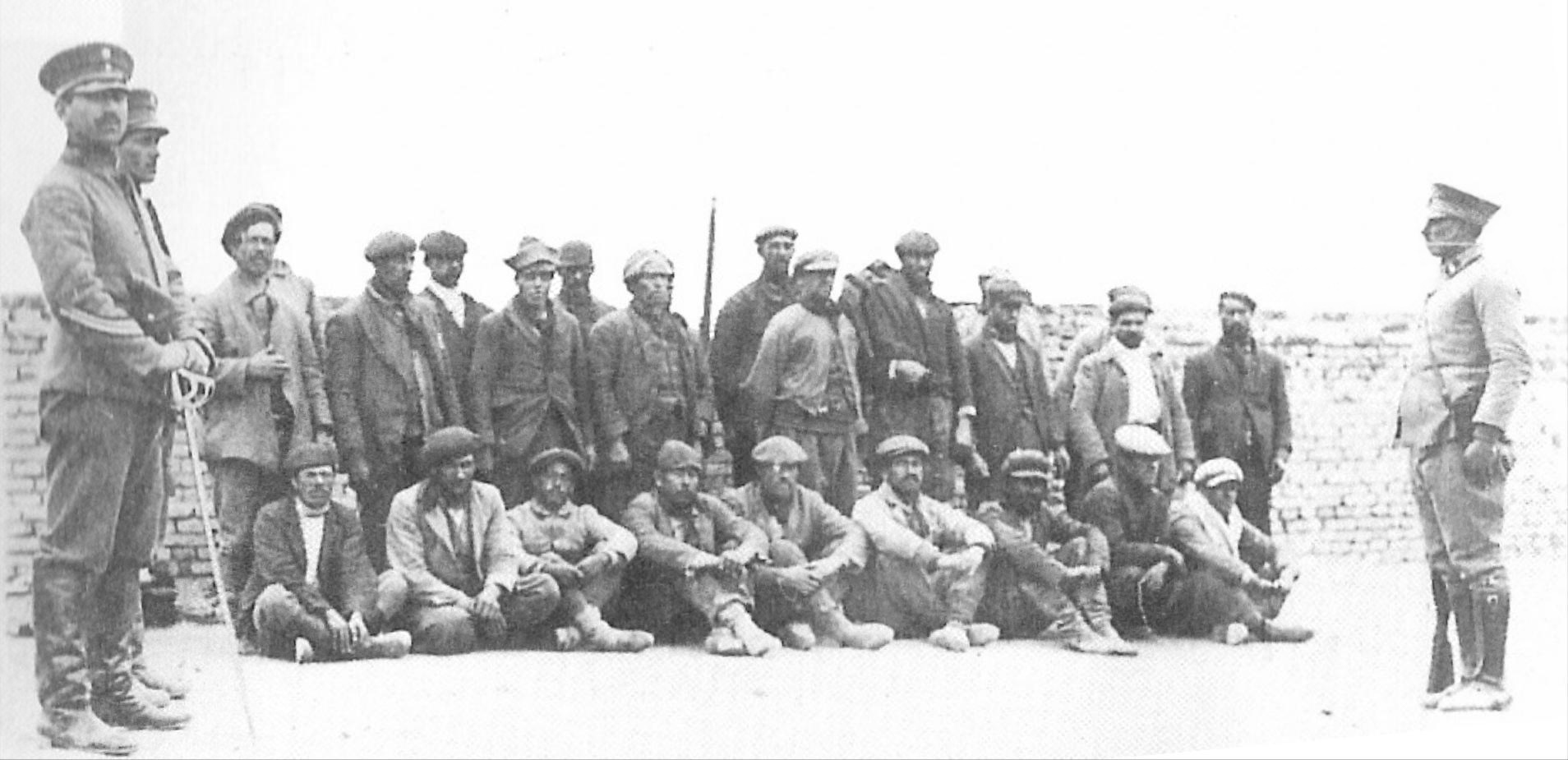
Arrested anarcho-syndicalist workers, following the Patagonia Rebellion, c. 1920

The outbreak of World War I split anarcho-syndicalists into internationalist and defencist camps; the former declared themselves against both sides of the war, while the latter supported the Allies against the Central Powers. The conflict ultimately demonstrated the inability of the international syndicalist movement to prevent war and discredited "neutral syndicalism" in the eyes of many workers, causing revolutionary sentiments to once again begin rising within the workers' movement. When the Revolutions of 1917–1923 spread throughout Europe, anarcho-syndicalists became keen participants in the revolutionary wave, during which they faced rising political repression. Anarcho-syndicalists in Europe, Latin America and Asia organised general strikes, sometimes reaching revolutionary proportions, but were ultimately suppressed by nationalist or communist dictatorships.

=== Apex ===
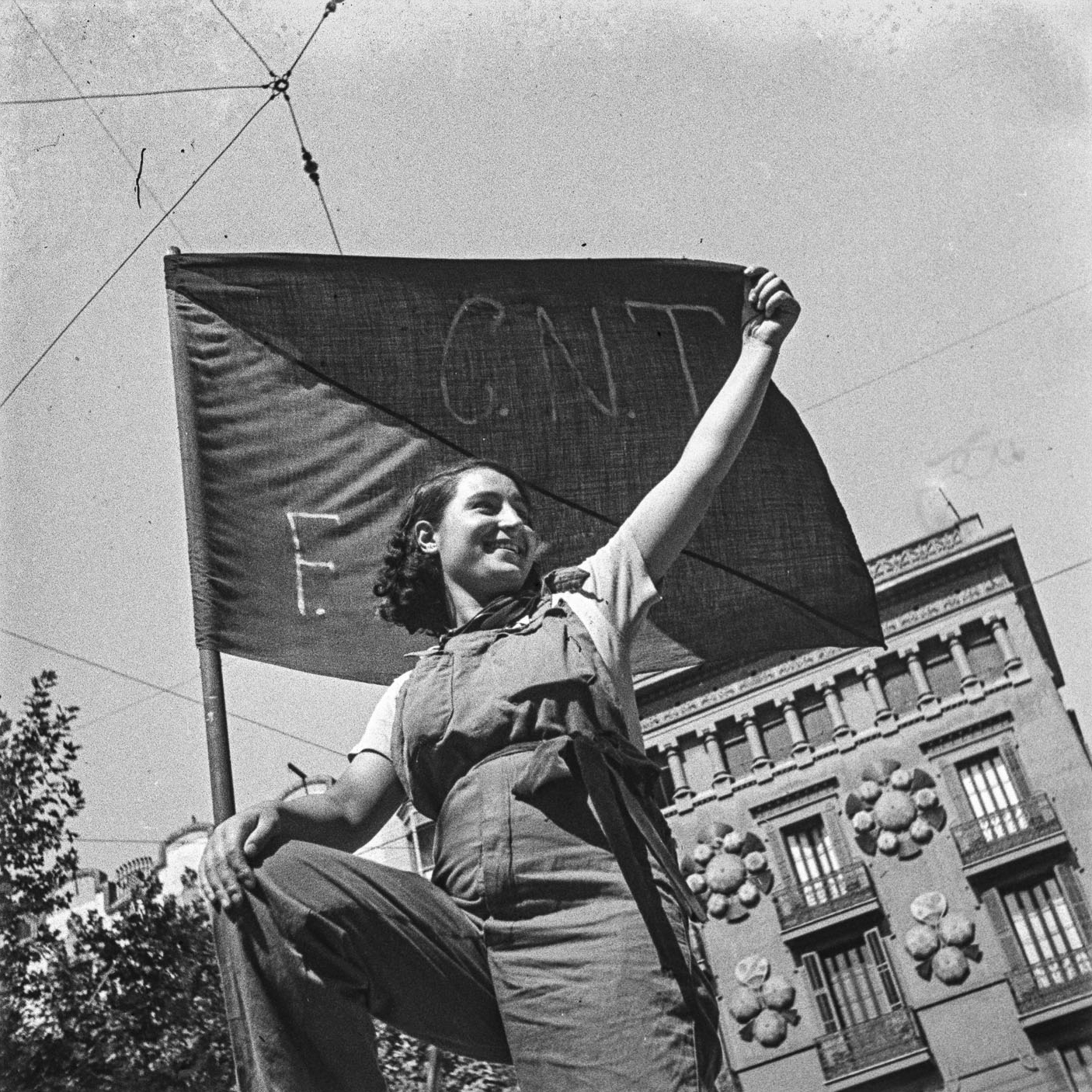
Anarchist militiawoman Ana Garbín on a barricade during the Spanish Revolution of 1936

Following the suppression of their movements and the rising influence of Marxism-Leninism throughout the world, anarcho-syndicalists moved to establish their own international organisation: the International Workers' Association (IWA). Theoretical discussions within the IWA led to debates on the issues of platformism, insurrectionism, industrialism and reformism, while the Spanish National Confederation of Labour (CNT) rose to prominence in the Spanish Republic. With the outbreak of the Spanish Civil War, the CNT led the defeat of the Nationalists in Catalonia, where they ignited an anarcho-syndicalist revolution that collectivised three-quarters of the Republican economy. The CNT's decision to join the Republican government caused controversy within the IWA and the social revolution was eventually suppressed by the government. The Republicans ultimately lost the war and the Spanish anarcho-syndicalists were imprisoned, killed or forced into exile by the victorious Francoist dictatorship.

=== Post-war decline ===
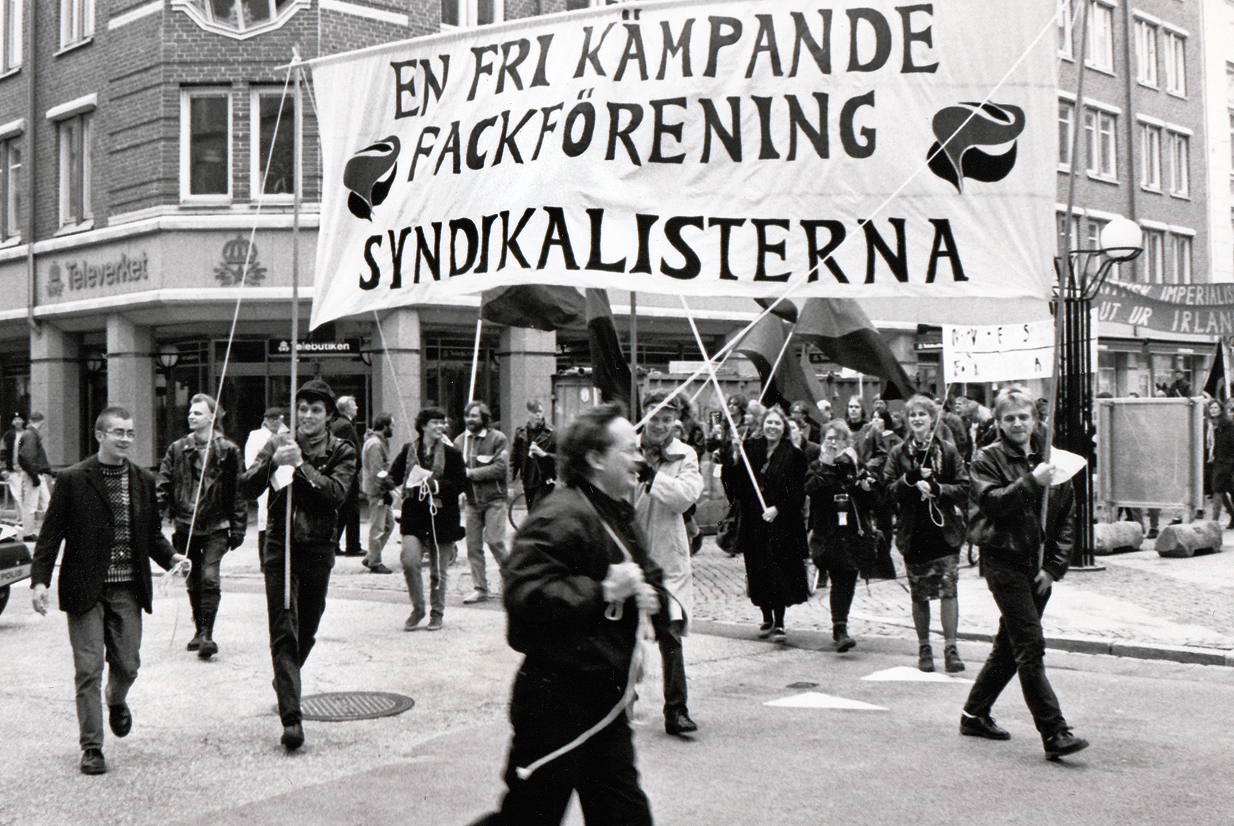
Members of the Central Organisation of the Workers of Sweden (SAC), marching on May Day in Malmö

During World War II, anarcho-syndicalists initially adopted an "internationalist" position, taking up the slogan "Neither Fascism, nor Antifascism." But following the Nazi occupation of Europe and the subsequent suppression of their organisations, anarcho-syndicalists throughout Europe reorientated themselves towards anti-fascism and joined the anti-fascist resistance. After the war, anarcho-syndicalism experienced a rapid decline, as anarcho-syndicalist unions were either marginalised by rising social corporatism or repressed by newly established authoritarian states. Anarcho-syndicalists proved unable to keep up with the changes in the post-war capitalist system, which hastened the decline of the anarcho-syndicalist movement and forced its organisations to choose between marginalisation, reform or dissolution. Despite the economic changes, the IWA chose to reaffirm traditional anarcho-syndicalist principles, causing its Dutch and Swedish sections to split from it. The SAC chose to revise its principles in order to adapt to the new Swedish welfare state, within which they aimed to establish workers' control over welfare and the democratisation of the economy. The IWA declined to its lowest point during the 1960s, as its membership became increasingly preoccupied with theory.

=== Contemporary revival ===
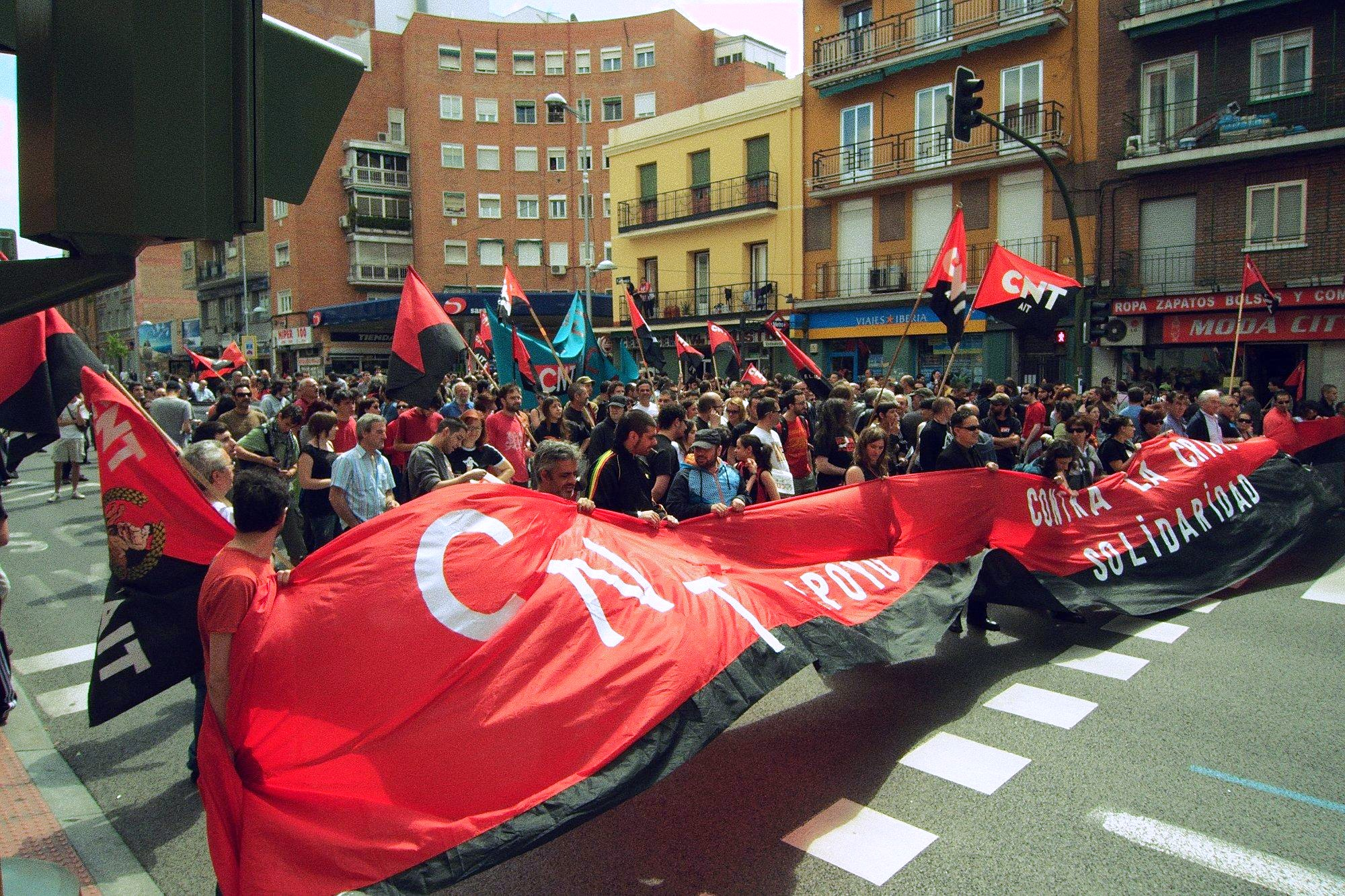
Members of the Spanish anarcho-syndicalist trade union CNT marching in Madrid with their red and black flags, 2010

The anarcho-syndicalist movement began to experience a revival in the wake of the protests of 1968 and the Spanish transition to democracy. While the Spanish CNT experienced a rapid growth, new anarcho-syndicalist organisations were established throughout Europe. As globalisation and neoliberalism led to the dismantling of welfare states in the West, while the Eastern Bloc collapsed, anarcho-syndicalists once again began to present libertarian socialism as a necessary alternative to the state and capitalism. By the turn of the 21st century, anarcho-syndicalism had experienced a resurgence, as anarcho-syndicalist organisations re-emerged throughout the globe. Existing anarcho-syndicalist unions once again began taking direct action and organising strikes, while new anarcho-syndicalist unions established large support bases and achieved social reforms.

== Theory ==
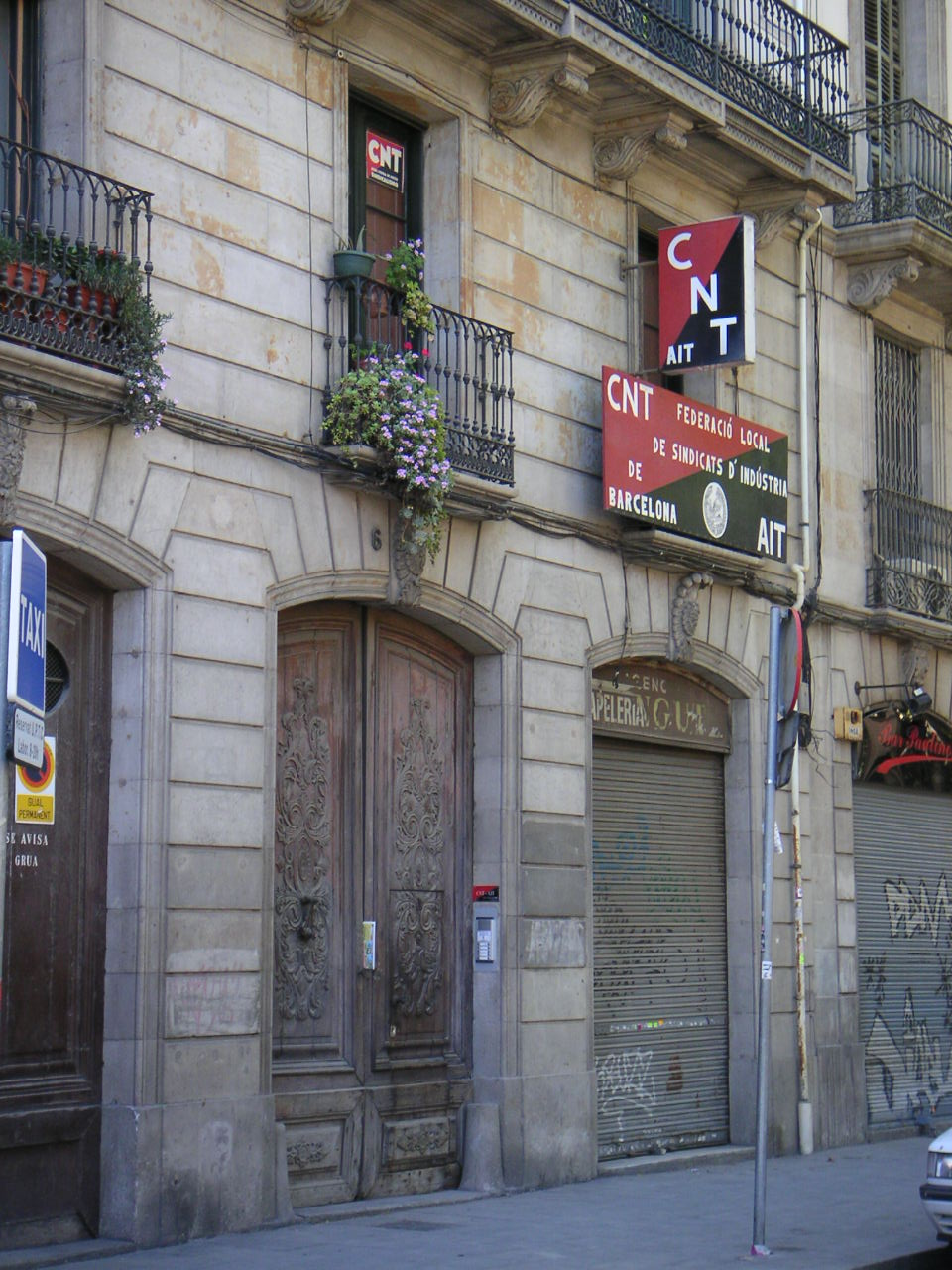
Offices of the National Confederation of Labour (CNT) in Barcelona

The political theory of anarcho-syndicalism is based on the foundations of libertarian socialism, as formulated by the anti-authoritarian faction of the International Workingmen's Association, while its organisational forms were adopted from revolutionary syndicalism, which was first put into practice by the French labour movement in the early 20th century.

Anarcho-syndicalism is distinguished from other forms of syndicalism by its anarchist political philosophy, whereas other syndicalist tendencies distance themselves from anarchism or even deny any political alignment. Other varieties of syndicalism include: the "neutral" revolutionary syndicalism, which separates itself from other political theories; Daniel De Leon's conception of industrial unionism, which infused it with a Marxist influence; and an authoritarian form of syndicalism developed by Georges Sorel, which advocates for vanguardism and mythmaking to drive the masses towards a general strike.

Anarcho-syndicalism also distinguishes itself from other forms of anarchism, due to its favourability towards industrialisation and organisation. While other forms of anarchism reject economic centralisation and the division of labour, considering the ideal of a stateless society to be one of decentralised, small-scale social units, anarcho-syndicalism foresees trade unions as taking over a large-scale and centralised industrial economy. Anarcho-syndicalists believe that the establishment of a syndicalist system could lead to the withering away of the state and as such to anarchy and communism. Some support the temporary establishment of a collectivist system of distribution "to each according to their contribution", until a state of post-scarcity is achieved, at which point it would give way to an anarchist communist system of distribution "from each according to their ability, to each according to their needs".

In the contemporary period, anarcho-syndicalism is divided into two main factions: the "orthodox" faction, which rejects any diversity of tactics or collaboration with statist forces, in favour of waiting for the right conditions for a revolutionary situation; and the "revisionist" faction, which is open to participation in systems of social welfare and pursues gradual reforms towards the democratisation of the economy.

=== Anti-politics ===
Anarcho-syndicalism is an apolitical or anti-political ideology, opposed to the formation of socialist political parties and participation in parliamentary politics. Anarcho-syndicalists argue that socialist participation in politics, rather than moving society closer to socialism, has damaged the labour movement by substituting self-help for representation. They have further criticised socialist parties for abandoning anti-capitalism in favour of nationalism, which they believe to have resulted in the reinforcement of capitalism and the integration of the labour movement into the nation state. To anarcho-syndicalists, political careerism corrupted socialist politicians, while electoralism transformed socialism from a constructive project into a reformist one. Anarcho-syndicalists are thus opposed to unions affiliating with political parties and attempt to prevent the capture of unions by party politicians. From this position, anarcho-syndicalists have denounced Bolshevism as a vehicle for authoritarianism and state capitalism, and criticised social democrats for bureaucratic inaction.

=== Trade unionism ===
Anarcho-syndicalists see trade unions not only as a means by which workers can organise for immediate improvements to their living and working conditions; but also as a means of training workers for management, with the goal of establishing workers' control over production and the creation of a socialist economy. Anarcho-syndicalists believe that trade unions are better suited for these tasks than socialist political parties, as workers often still require trade unions to protect their rights even under socialist governments. Anarcho-syndicalists consider trade unions to be the vanguard of the labour movement; they believe workers' power resides in the economic sphere, as they are responsible for producing the wealth that society relies upon. For anarcho-syndicalists, trade unions represent the prefiguration of a future socialist economy, the foundation that a new syndicalist society will be built on. Workers' education is therefore at the centre of anarcho-syndicalism, which aims to use trade unions to prepare workers to take over management of the industrial economy.

=== Federalism ===
Outline of the federal system used by anarcho-syndicalism

Anarcho-syndicalism organises itself according to the principles of federalism and free association, in which the self-determination of each individual is upheld. Anarcho-syndicalists are staunchly opposed to centralised, hierarchical forms of organisation, which they believe stifle independent initiative with bureaucracy. In anarcho-syndicalist organisations, individual unions carry out their activities on a voluntary basis; for any larger-scale activity that requires delegation, representatives are typically elected for single terms and are paid the same amount as the workers they represent. Anarcho-syndicalists believe that centralism weakens and inhibits workers' capacity to take independent action and make decisions, and that centralised organisations inevitably tend towards inertia and stagnation. In contrast, they believe that federalist organisations provide workers with both the means to take rapid action in individual struggles and also connections that could allow them to establish workers' control of the economy and society in a social revolution.

According to the anarcho-syndicalist model, federal organisations are built from the bottom-up, on both a territorial and industrial basis: first, workers join in independent trade unions; the trade unions in a given city or district then combine into a cartel, which act as centres for popular education and build solidarity between workers of different trades; the cartels then group together on a regional basis, up to the national level, providing larger-scale coordination between its member organisations. Under this model, each trade union is also federatively linked with other unions of the same trade and related trades in industrial unions, which allow workers a greater scope of solidarity actions in struggles relevant to their economic sector. Anarcho-syndicalists see this federative form of industrial organisation as the nucleus for the reorganisation of the economy and society, as it would be able to take over the management of production in every economic sector. In such a revolutionary situation, cartels would take over production in their communities, determine the needs of their local population and organise the economy to meet those needs. A national federation would likewise be able to organise production throughout a given country to meet the needs of the entire populace nationwide, while the industrial unions established workers' control over the means of production and transportation.

== Practice ==
In contrast to political parties that seek to enhance the political power of states over society, anarcho-syndicalists aim to restrict the ability of the state to act and influence society. Anarcho-syndicalism also seeks to abolish capitalism and replace it with socialism, which it does by lowering the profit margins of business owners and raising the workers' share in the product of their own labour. Anarcho-syndicalists consider the state to be a result of class stratification, established and maintained in order to protect the monopoly of capitalists over the economy. As such, anarcho-syndicalists predict that the dissolution of the state will be an inevitable consequence of the abolition of capitalism. While moving towards this, they also consider it necessary to protect the civil and political rights that workers have achieved from political reaction.

Anarcho-syndicalism is driven by the practice of direct action, which eschews legalistic methods in favour of workers forcing their employers to make concessions. Methods of direct action include boycotts, sabotage and strike actions, the latter of which syndicalists framed as a "revolutionary drill" to prepare workers for the overthrow of capitalism and the state.

== See also ==
- Kronstadt rebellion
- Left-libertarianism
- List of federations of trade unions
- Participatory economics
- Solidarity unionism
- Wildcat strike action

== Bibliography ==
- Damier, Vadim (2009) [2000]. Anarcho-syndicalism in the 20th Century. Translated by Archibald, Malcolm. Edmonton: Black Cat Press. ISBN 978-0-9737827-6-9.
- Hirsch, Steven J.; van der Walt, Lucien (2010a). "Rethinking Anarchism and Syndicalism: the colonial and postcolonial experience, 1870–1940". In Hirsch, Steven J.; van der Walt, Lucien (eds.). Anarchism and Syndicalism in the Colonial and Postcolonial World, 1870–1940. Studies in Global Social History. Vol. 6. Leiden: Brill. pp. xxxi–lxxiii. ISBN 9789004188495. OCLC 868808983.
- Hirsch, Steven J.; van der Walt, Lucien (2010b). "Final Reflections: the vicissitudes of anarchist and syndicalist trajectories, 1940 to the present". In Hirsch, Steven J.; van der Walt, Lucien (eds.). Anarchism and Syndicalism in the Colonial and Postcolonial World, 1870–1940. Studies in Global Social History. Vol. 6. Leiden: Brill. pp. 395–412. ISBN 9789004188495. OCLC 868808983.
- Rocker, Rudolf (1989) [1938]. Anarcho-Syndicalism. Pluto Press. ISBN 0-7453-1392-2.
- Thorpe, Wayne (1989). The Workers Themselves. Kluwer Academic Publishers. ISBN 0-7923-0276-1. LCCN 89-8205.
- van der Walt, Lucien; Schmidt, Michael (2009). Black Flame: The Revolutionary Class Politics of Anarchism and Syndicalism. Edinburgh: AK Press. ISBN 978-1-904859-16-1. LCCN 2006933558. OCLC 1100238201.
- van der Walt, Lucien (2016). "Global Anarchism and Syndicalism: Theory, History, Resistance". Anarchist Studies. 24 (1): 85–106. ISSN 0967-3393.
- van der Walt, Lucien (2018). "Syndicalism". In Adams, Matthew S.; Levy, Carl (eds.). The Palgrave Handbook of Anarchism. London: Palgrave Macmillan. pp. 249–264. doi:10.1007/978-3-319-75620-2_14. ISBN 978-3319756196. S2CID 242074567.
- Zimmer, Kenyon (2018). "Haymarket and the Rise of Syndicalism". In Adams, Matthew S.; Levy, Carl (eds.). The Palgrave Handbook of Anarchism. London: Palgrave Macmillan. pp. 353–370. doi:10.1007/978-3-319-75620-2_21. ISBN 978-3319756196. S2CID 242074567.
