= Federação Nacional dos Trabalhadores de Angola =

Federação Nacional dos Trabalhadores de Angola ('National Federation of Workers of Angola', abbreviated FNTA) was a small Angolan trade union organization in exile, based in Kinshasa. FNTA was founded in mid-1964 by dissidents from UNTA. S. David N'Dombasie was the general secretary of FNTA. FNTA was largely based in the Bazombo ethnic group.

Soon after its foundation, FNTA began seeking financial support from trade union bodies abroad (as did many other exiled groups in Kinshasa). FNTA appealed to the American AFL-CIO for material support.

FNTA joined hands with UGTA and CGTA in denouncing the UNTA-led coalition CUACSA, following a CUACSA statement denouncing the other Kinshasa-based unions.

As of 1967, FNTA had ceased to exist.
