= União Geral dos Trabalhadores de Angola =

União Geral dos Trabalhadores de Angola ('General Union of the Workers of Angola', abbreviated UGTA) was an Angolan trade union organization in exile. UGTA was founded in 1964 following a split away from Liga Geral dos Trabalhadores de Angola (LGTA), and was linked to the Council of the Angolan People (CPA, a small Kinshasa-based political movement). UGTA would later become aligned with UNITA.

UGTA was founded by the former LGTA leader Andre Martins-Kassinda. As of December 1966 Paul Bing was the UGTA chairman, Bernardo Domingos the vice president, André Kassinda general secretary, Carlos Manuel Pacheco assistant general secretary and Mauricio Luvualu secretary for international relations. UGTA was affiliated to the World Federation of Trade Unions and the All-African Trade Union Federation.

UGTA joined hands with Federação Nacional dos Trabalhadores de Angola and the Confederação Geral dos Trabalhadores de Angola in denouncing the UNTA-led coalition CUACSA, following a CUACSA statement denouncing the other Kinshasa-based unions.

In 1971 the then UGTA general secretary, Mauricio Luvualu, was handed over to the Portuguese by the Kinshasa government. Luvualu was sentenced to forced labour. Upon his release in 1974 he founded a new trade union movement, Confederação Nacional dos Trabalhadores de Angola (CNTA). UGTA merged with the CNTA at a congress held April 24–25, 1975, forming the Sindicato Angolano dos Camponeses e Operários (SINDACO). The International Confederation of Free Trade Unions was represented at the event.
