= List of trade unions in Uruguay =

The Plenario Intersindical de Trabajadores – Convención Nacional de Trabajadores (PIT-CNT) is the national trade union center.

List of trade unions
Acronym	Name
ADEMU	Asociación de Maestros del Uruguay
ADEOM	Asociación de Empleados y Obreros Muncipales
ADUR-FDDU	Asociación de Docentes de la Universidad de la República
AEBU	Asociación de Empleados Bancarios del Uruguay
AEU	Asociación de Escribanos del Uruguay
AFAE	Asociación de Funcionarios de la Asociación Española
AFCC	Agremiación de Funcionarios de Cooperativas de Consumo
AFFUR	Agremiación Federal de Funcionarios no docentes de la Universidad de la República
AFINCO	Asociación de Funcionarios del Instituto Nacional de Colonización
AFJU	Asociación de Funcionarios Judiciales del Uruguay
AFPU	Asociación de Funcionarios Postales del Uruguay
AFUTU	Asociación de Funcionarios de la Universidad del Trabajo del Uruguay
AGADU	Asociación General de Autores del Uruguay
AMEPU	Asociación de Meretrices Profesionales del Uruguay
AOEC	Asociación de Obreros y Empleados de Conaprole
APU	Asociación de la Prensa Uruguaya
APMU	Asociación del Personal de Médica Uruguaya
ASIAP	Asociación de Informáticos del Uruguay
AsIJu	Asociación de Informáticos Judiciales
AIU	Asociación de Ingenieros del Uruguay
ATSS	Asociación de Trabajadores de la Seguridad Social
AUCE	Asociación Uruguaya de Correctores de Estilo
AUTE	Agrupación de Funcionarios de UTE
CAU	Colegio de Abogados del Uruguay
CEAM	Centro de Empleados de Agencias Maritimas
COFE	Confederación de Organizaciones de Funcionarios del Estado
COT	Congreso Obrero Textil
CPU	Circulo Policial del Uruguay
CUOPYC	Centro Unión Obreros Papeleros y Celulosa
FANCAP	Federación ANCAP
FEMI	Federación Médica del Interior
FENAPES	Federación Nacional de Profesores de Enseñanza Secundaria
FEUU	Federación de Estudiantes Universitarios del Uruguay
FFOSE	Federación de Funcionarios de O.S.E.
FFSP	Federación de Funcionarios de Salud Pública
FOEB	Federación de Obreros y Empleados de la Bebida
FOEMYA	Federación de Obreros y Empleados Molineros y Afines
FOICA	Federación de Obreros de la Industria de la Carne y Afines
FOPCU	Federación de Obreros, Papeleros, Cartoneros del Uruguay
FORU	Uruguayan Regional Workers' Federation
FUECYS	Federación Uruguaya de Empleados de Comercio y Servicios
FUM	Federación Uruguaya de Magisterio
FUS	Federación Uruguaya de la Salud
FTIL	Federación de Trabajadores de la Industria Láctea
MUFP	Mutual Uruguaya de Futbolistas Profesionales
SAG	Sindicato de Artes Gráficas
SAU	Sociedad de Arquitectos del Uruguay
SIMA	Sindicato de la Industria del Medicamento y Afines
SINTEP	Sindicato Nacional de Trabajadores de la Enseñanza Privada
SMU	Sindicato Medico del Uruguay
SOIMA	Sindicato de Obreros de la Industria Maderera y Afines
STIQ	Sindicato de Trabajadores de la Industria Química
SUA	Sociedad Uruguaya de Actores
SUA Vestimenta	Sindicato Único de la Aguja y Ramas Afines
SUATT	Sindicato Único de Automóviles con Taxímetro y Telefonistas
SUEBU	Sindicato de Trabajadores de UPM Uruguay
SUGHU	Sindicato Único Gastronómico y Hotelero del Uruguay
SUINAU	Sindicato Único de Trabajadores del INAU
SUNCA	Sindicato Único Nacional de la Construcción y Anexos
SUNTMA	Sindicato Único de Trabajadores del Mar y Afines
SUPRA	Sindicato Único Portuario y Ramas Afines
SUPU	Sindicato Único de Policías del Uruguay
SUTCRA	Sindicato Único del Transporte de Carga y Ramas Afines
SUTD	Sindicato Único de Trabajadoras Domésticas
SUTEL	Sindicato Único de Telecomunicaciones
SUTEM	Sindicato Unido de Trabajadores de Edificios de Maldonado
SUTRASE	Sindicato Único de Trabajadores de Securitas
UAOEGAS	Unión Autónoma de Obreros y Empleados del Gas
UNATRASE	Unión Nacional de Trabajadores de la Seguridad Privada
UNOTT	Unión Nacional de Obreros y Trabajadores del Transporte
UNTMRA	Unión Nacional de Trabajadores del Metal y Ramas Afines
UOC	Unión de Obreros Curtidores
UF	Unión Ferroviaria del Uruguay
UTC	Unión de Trabajadores de Cutcsa
UTHC	Unión de Trabajadores del Hospital de Clínicas

== See also ==
- Instituto Cuesta Duarte
