= CGTU =

CGTU may refer to

- Confederación General del Trabajo del Uruguay, a trade union confederation in Uruguay active from 1929 to 1934
- Confédération générale du travail unitaire, a trade union confederation in France founded in 1922.
