= Red and black flag =

Flag of anarchist and antifascist movements

- Red and black flag of the CNT-FAI
- Adopted: 1 May 1931; 95 years ago
- Designed by: Anarcho-syndicalists - Juan García Oliver

The red and black flag or rojinegro, also called the anarcho-syndicalist flag, is one of the central symbols of the anarchist movement.

It is a variation of the anarchist black flag and the red flag of syndicalism, resulting from the union between the CNT (Confederación Nacional del Trabajo), the main anarcho-syndicalist organization in Spain, some of whose groups used the red flag, and the FAI (Iberian Anarchist Federation), the anarchist federation in Spain, whose groups used the traditional black anarchist flag. The CNT-FAI first publicly displayed it on the 1st May 1931, about two weeks after the success of the Spanish Revolution.

The influence of the CNT-FAI in the fight against fascism, particularly during the Spanish Civil War, gave this symbol a broader significance, to the point that it came to be adopted by Antifa movements in general.

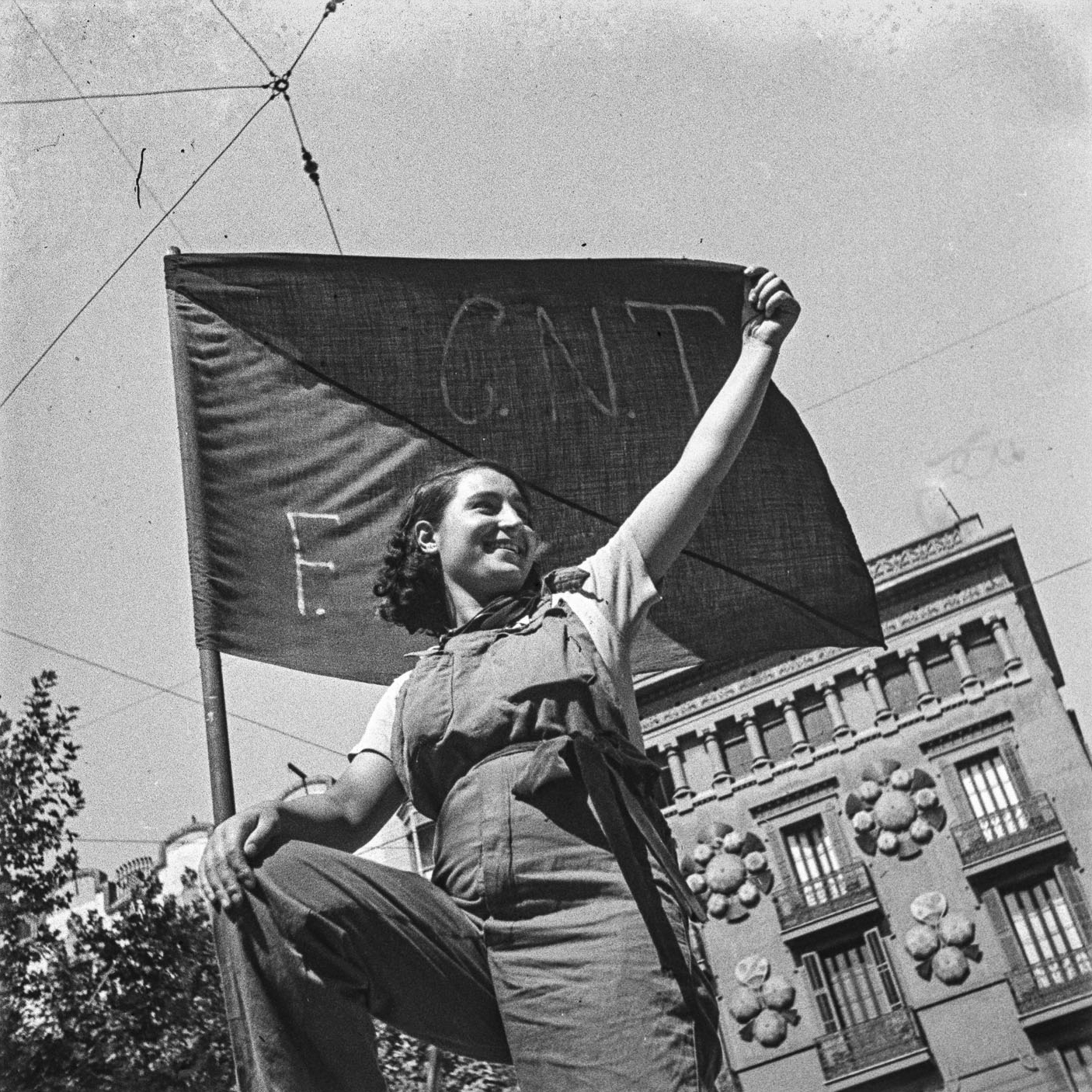
Anita Garbín, on the picture called the Anarchist Madonna, in front of the CNT-FAI red and black flag (1936)

This flag is the first of the bisected anarchist flags, composed of the black flag and an additional color—several other tendencies within the anarchist movement subsequently adopted this operational mode to represent themselves, such as anarcha-feminism or queer anarchism.

== History ==
=== Context ===
==== Birth of anarchism, its anarcho-syndicalist tendency, and the union of anarchist groups in Barcelona ====
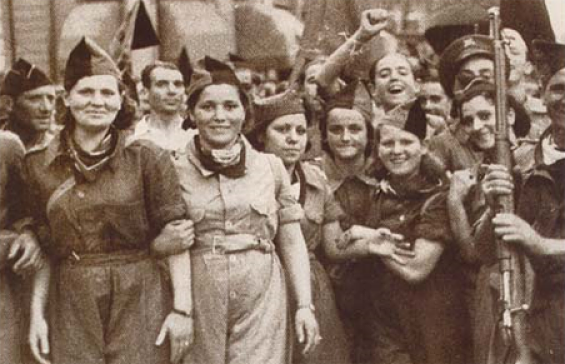
CNT-FAI militiawomen in Barcelona in July 1936 with their red and black two-tone hats, echoing the flag.

In the 19th century, the development of capitalism saw the formation of several opposing political ideologies and movements, particularly anarchism. Anarchists advocate for the struggle against all forms of domination perceived as unjust, among which is economic domination, with the development of capitalism. They are particularly opposed to the State, viewed as the institution enabling the endorsement of many of these dominations through its police, army, and propaganda. They want to replace the State and capitalism by equalitarian, voluntary, stateless societies.

Between the 1880s and the 1900s, many anarchists joined unions, such as the CGT in France, and became integrated into revolutionary syndicalist circles, a movement supporting the use of unions to lead the social revolution. Unfortunately for the anarchists, these unions, like the CGT, often became reformist, and the weakness of revolutionary syndicalism—which does not need to be explicitly anarchist—became increasingly clear to them. This prompted them to develop a new tendency within anarchism: anarcho-syndicalism. This tendency brought together anarchists who wished to found trade unions on explicitly anarchist bases to prevent these unions from becoming reformist over time and to lead a genuine anarchist revolution.

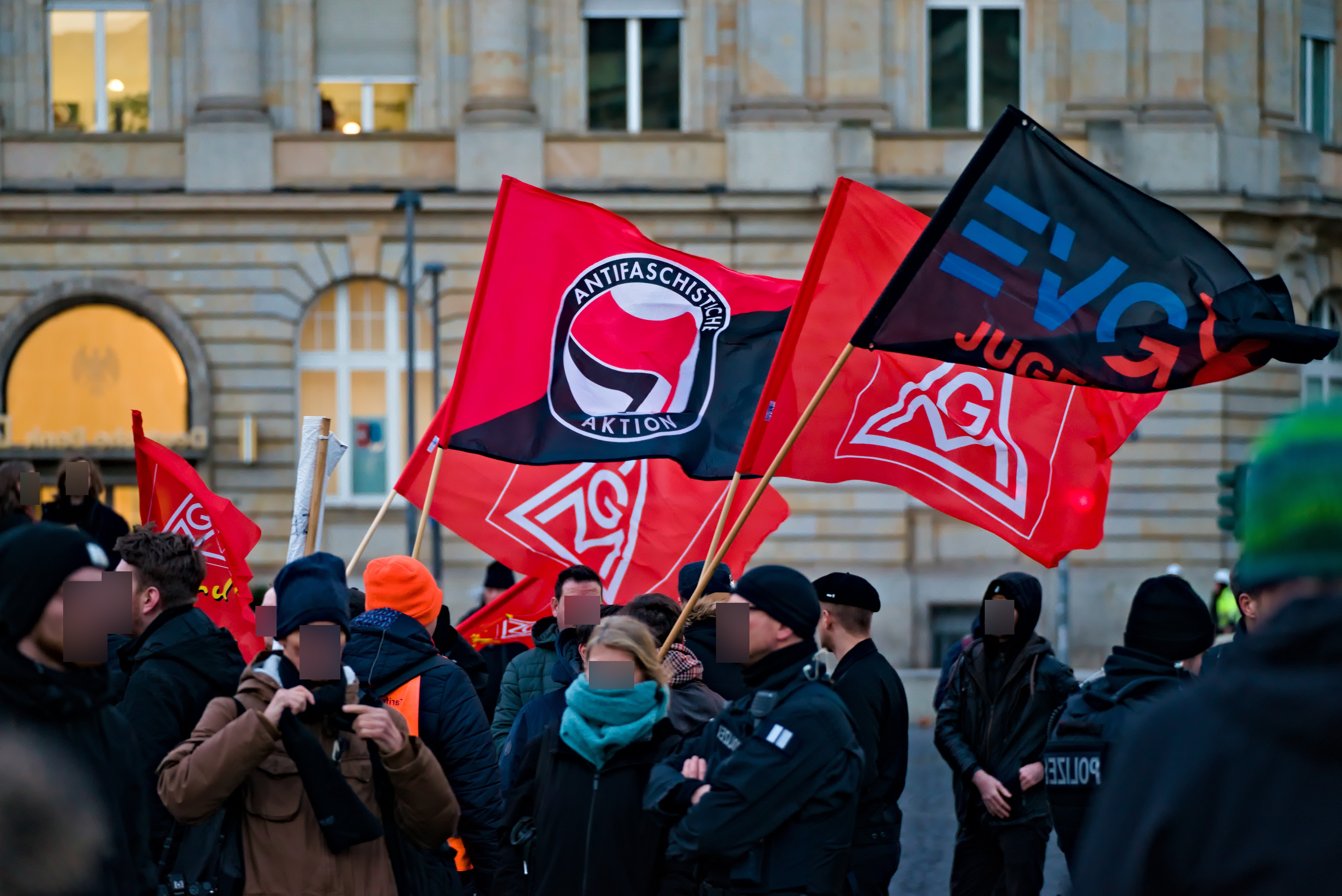
Antifascists deploying their flags during a demonstration in Frankfurt (2024).

One of the first organizations of this nature was the CNT (Confederación Nacional del Trabajo), founded in 1910, which gradually adopted very strong anarcho-syndicalist positions. By 1919, it had approximately 700,000 members and was one of the main revolutionary organizations in Spain. Some anarchist women within the CNT also founded the anarcha-feminist organization Mujeres Libres ('Free Women').

Anarchism in Spain underwent several changes in the early 20th century: several tendencies emerged, including an anarcho-syndicalist tendency, which joined groups using the red flag like the Bandera Roja ('Red Flag') group in Barcelona, and a more traditional anarchist tendency, opposed to joining unions and favourable to propaganda of the deed, which somewhat overlapped with the lines of the Iberian Anarchist Federation (FAI), founded in 1927, using the black anarchist flag and meeting in Barcelona in a group named Bandera Negra ('Black Flag'). These two groups united in 1923 but were banned and repressed during the dictatorship of Primo de Rivera (1923–1930), which impacted their ability to display common symbols.

=== Red and black flag ===
==== Early versions of the flag ====
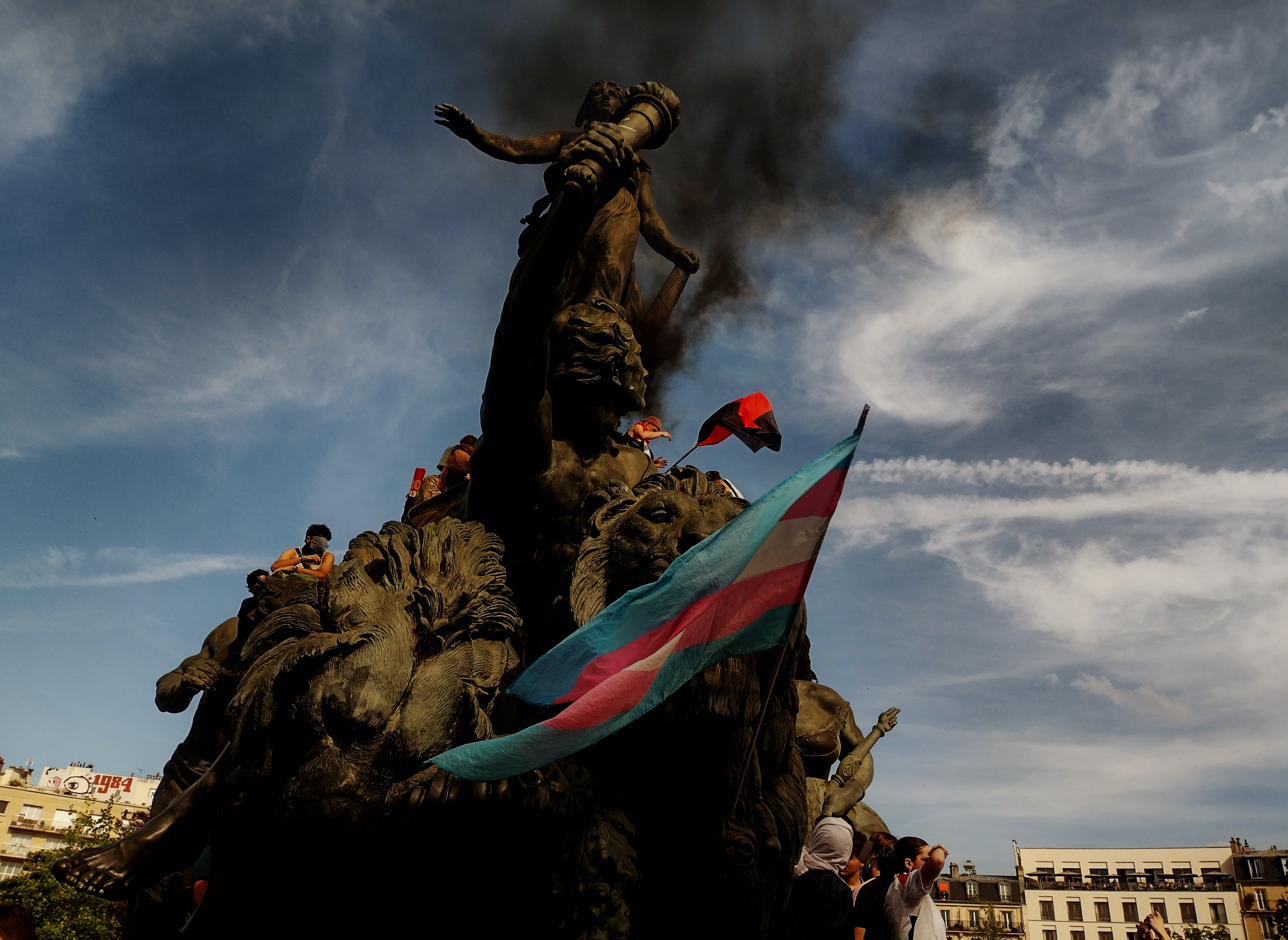
Red and black and trans flags on Le Triomphe de la République in Paris (1st of May 2025).

Red and black are colours frequently used by anarchists throughout their history. From the very appearance of this movement and the black anarchist flag, red and black flags were often flown together, though they were not the same specific flag. It is possible that some anarchists used a red flag bordered with black in the 1880s–1900s.

During the Mexican Revolution, anarchists there displayed a red and black flag composed of horizontal stripes, and starting from the 1910s, this type of association appears to have multiplied, particularly among anarcho-syndicalists.

==== García Oliver and the invention of the red and black flag ====
In 1930, the situation in Spain evolved when the dictatorship of Primo de Rivera came to an end, followed the next year, on 14 April 1931, by the Spanish Revolution—in which anarchists actively participated—and which put an end to the Spanish monarchy. Fifteen days later, for the 1st of May celebration to be held in Barcelona, Juan García Oliver, a notable figure of the CNT during this period, decided to commission four red and black flags, split in the middle, and a traditional anarchist black flag representing the FAI.

In his statements on the subject, he seems to indicate that the symbol had already existed clandestinely a few years prior.

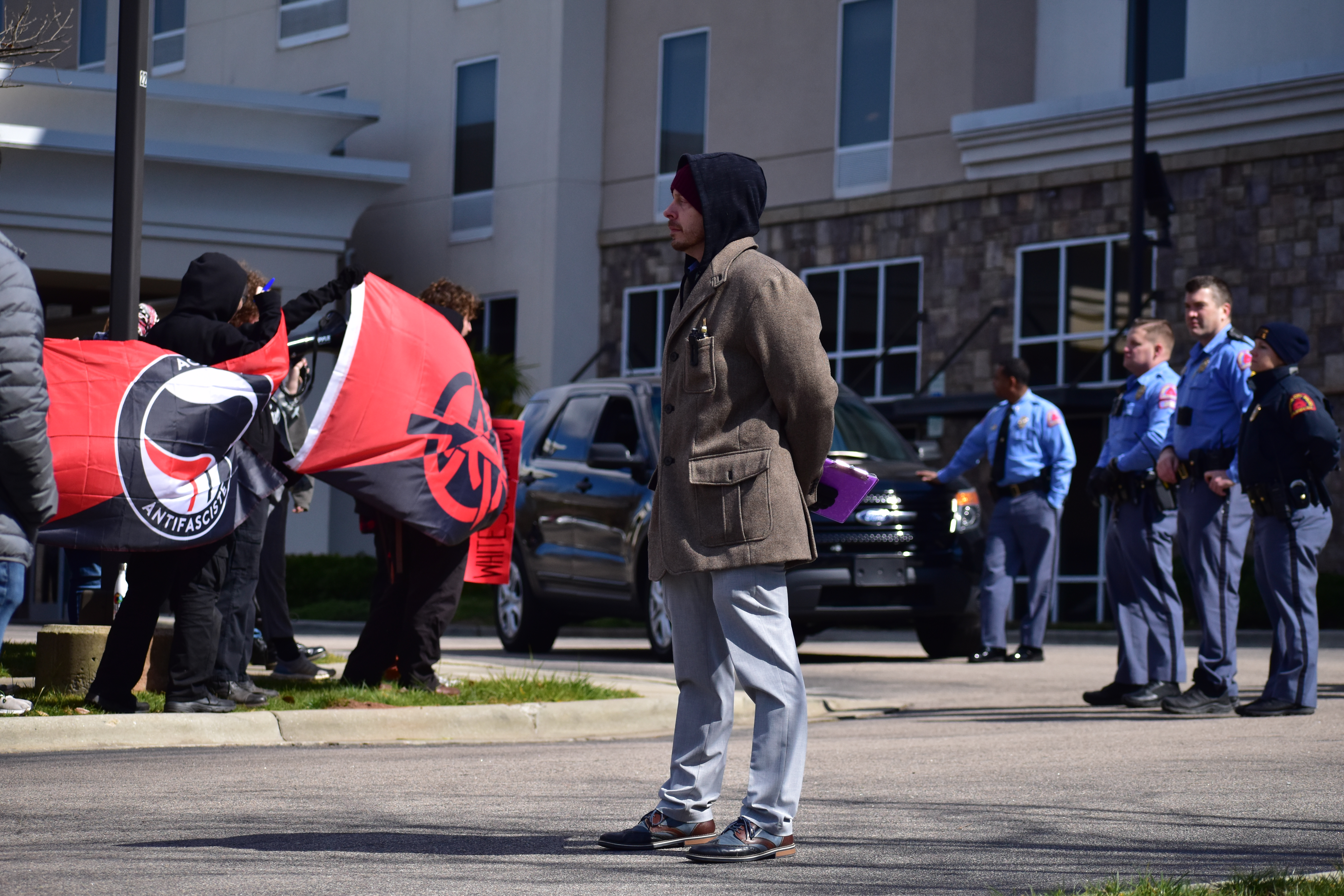
No Confederate Conferences, with a circle A (2020 Feb)

In any case, the use of the red and black flag or rojinegro made a strong impression on the crowds gathered that day, providing a symbol for anarcho-syndicalism and the unity of anarchists in Spain at that time. It subsequently became the principal symbol of the CNT-FAI, the union between the CNT and the FAI, which displayed it throughout the Civil War, where these organizations played a major role in the fight against fascism and Franco.

== Legacy ==
=== Anarchist and anarcho-syndicalist symbol, then generalization to the antifascist movement ===
The newly created anarcho-syndicalist flag, which was abundantly used by the CNT-FAI, left a significant mark on the memory of the far-left and became one of the privileged symbols of the antifascist movement.

=== Bisected flags ===
Other tendencies within anarchism, such as anarcha-feminism, reused this split design by choosing colours other than red, symbols that have appeared at least since the early 2000s.

== Bibliography ==
- Baker, Zoe (2023), Means and Ends: The Revolutionary Practice of Anarchism in Europe and the United States, Edinburgh: AK Press, ISBN 978-1-84935-498-1
- Berthier, René (2015), La fin de la première Internationale [The end of the First Internationale] (in French), Paris: Le Monde Libertaire, ISBN 978-2915514636
- Jourdain, Edouard (2013). L'anarchisme [Anarchism]. Paris: La Découverte. ISBN 978-2-7071-9091-8.
- García Oliver, Juan (1978), El eco de los pasos. El anarcosindicalismo...en la calle, ...en el Comité de Milicias, ...en el gobierno, ...en el exilio (PDF), Paris: Ruedo Ibérico, ISBN 84-85361-06-7
- Ward, Colin (2004). Anarchism: A Very Short Introduction. Oxford University Press (OUP).
