= CNTA =

CNTA may refer to:

- China National Tourism Administration, a former government authority
- Confederação Nacional dos Trabalhadores de Angola, an Angolan trade union
- Canadian Number Theory Association, a mathematical organisation
