= Confederação dos Sindicatos Livres de Angola =

Angolan trade union

Confederação dos Sindicatos Livres de Angola ('Confederation of Free Trade Unions of Angola', abbreviated CSLA) was an Angolan trade union organization in exile. CSLA was launched by MDIA, a small pacifist Bakongo movement, in September 1962. CSLA insisted on using non-violent methods of struggle. In 1964 CSLA joined the National Union of Angolan Workers, forming a joint coordination body CUACSA. CSLA worked in liaison with Nto-Bako organized campaigns and MDIA, calling on Angolan refugees to return home. In 1964 CSLA claimed that they had organized the return of 4,000 Angolan workers, to build CSLA organization inside the country.

In July 1966 CSLA withdrew from CUACSA.

In 1968, CSLA would claim to have 37,926 members, but in fact the organization had a very marginal existence.
