= Confederação Nacional dos Trabalhadores de Angola =

Confederação Nacional dos Trabalhadores de Angola ('National Confederation of the Workers of Angola', abbreviated CNTA) was an Angolan trade union organization. CNTA was founded by Mauricio Luvualu in Luanda in 1974. Luvualu had been a leader of the União Geral dos Trabalhadores de Angola, but was handed over by the Kinshasa government to the Portuguese in 1971 and sentenced to forced labour. Upon his release in 1974, he received a financial compensation, and with these funds he set up CNTA. For a brief period until MPLA monopolized trade union activities under UNTA, CNTA was the main labour organization inside the country. CNTA organized a series of strikes demanding higher salaries and improved terms of employment. The organization protested against the proposal to install a single trade union centre in the country, charging it as being a plot hatched by the Portuguese government.

At a congress held April 24–25, 1975 CNTA merged with the UNITA-aligned UGTA, forming the Sindicato Angolano dos Camponeses e Operários. The International Confederation of Free Trade Unions was represented at the event.
