= Sindicato Angolano dos Camponeses e Operários =

Sindicato Angolano dos Camponeses e Operários ('Angolan Trade Union of Peasants and Workers', abbreviated SINDACO) was a trade union in Angola. SINDACO was linked to UNITA.

SINDACO was founded at a congress held April 24–25, 1975 where the CNTA and merged with the UNITA-aligned UGTA. The International Confederation of Free Trade Unions was represented at the event.

SINDACO remained based mainly in the Ovimbundu-dominated cities of Huambo and Lobito, whilst being marginalized in Luanda (where MPLA was monopolizing control over the trade union movement). SINDACO activities were disrupted by the Angolan Civil War. In Lobito SINDACO was led by Jorge Valemtim.
