= León Duarte =

Uruguayan trade unionist and anarchist

León Gualberto Duarte Luján (1928 – 1976) was a Uruguayan trade unionist and the leader of the Partido por la Victoria del Pueblo. He disappeared in Buenos Aires on July 13, 1976.

== Political activity ==
Duarte was elected as the general secretary of the FUNSA Union in 1957, having been involved in its beginnings as the CNT. Duarte was an anarchist, and worked to found the Resistencia Obrero Estudiantil alongside Washington Pérez. Duarte was also a member of the Uruguayan Anarchist Federation (Federación Anarquista Uruguaya).

== Detention ==
On July 13, 1976, Duarte disappeared in Buenos Aires, after being detained in a bar on Calle San Juan, together with Sergio López and Ana Quadros. From there, he was moved to Automotores Orlett - a clandestine detention center, where some of his co-detainees claimed to have seen him last.

== Legacy ==
The trade union think-tank Instituto Cuesta Duarte is named in his honor.
