= Liga Geral dos Trabalhadores de Angola =

LGTA
- Liga Geral dos Trabalhadores de Angola
- Dissolved: September 22, 1973
- Headquarters: Leopoldville/Kinshasa, Congo
- Location: Angola
- Members: 1,500
- Key people: André Martins-Kassinda, Pedro Barreiro Lulendo
- Affiliations: ICFTU, AFRO

Liga Geral dos Trabalhadores de Angola ('General League of Angolan Workers', abbreviated LGTA) was an Angolan trade union organization in exile. Being based amongst Angolan refugees in neighbouring Congo-Kinshasa, LGTA was linked to the National Liberation Front of Angola (FNLA). During the 1960s, LGTA was the largest Angolan trade union outfit.

== Founding ==
LGTA was launched in order to counter the pro-MPLA exile trade union UNTA. The new organization was based in Leopoldville/Kinshasa (Congo). In its initial phase, LGTA received support from the Congolese trade union centre FGTK.

== International affiliations ==
LGTA joined the International Confederation of Free Trade Unions and AFRO (the regional ICFTU organization) in 1961. LGTA had around 1,500 members in the mid-1960s. LGTA received funding from ICFTU and AFL-CIO. This funding was passed on to the FNLA and the UPA.

== Expansion of activities ==
In 1963 LGTA conducted a modest expansion of its activities. It set up women's and youth wings, FLGTA and JLGTA. The youth wing was running educational programmes. Moreover the organization began organizing Angolan villagers in areas under the control of guerrillas.

== Kassinda ==
André Martins-Kassinda was appointed general secretary of LGTA. However, Kassinda rebelled against the FNLA leader Holden Roberto soon thereafter. On February 8, 1963 the LGTA executive sent a formal request to obtain membership in the FNLA, seeking to expand trade union activities and behind able to form a counter-weight to Holden. Eventually breaking with Holden, Kassinda charged the FNLA with 'tribalism'. Kassinda's new political outfit, the Angolan People's Council, launched a new trade union, UGTA. After the Kassinda split, Pedro Barreiro Lulendo became the new LGTA secretary. Pedro Rana was administrative secretary and Pierre Naninthela was the regional secretary for Congo.

== Later period ==
By the early 1970s, LGTA claimed to have 33,000 members. The African-American Labor Center and the Union nationale des travailleurs congolais (later renamed Union nationale des travailleurs zaïrois, UNTZa) organized joint seminars and courses for organizers of LGTA and the Catholic union CGTA, focusing on labour history, organizing, administration and rural cooperatives. By October 1971 some 115 Angolan exiled unionists had participated in these trainings. In 1973 an Italian union helped LGTA set up its own training centre.

On September 22, 1973 LGTA merged with CGTA, forming Central Sindical Angolana ('Angolan Trade Union Centre', CSA).
