= Plenario Intersindical de Trabajadores – Convención Nacional de Trabajadores =

Uruguayan national trade union center

PIT-CNT
- Intersyndical Plenary of Workers - National Convention of Workers
- Plenario Intersindical de Trabajadores - Convención Nacional de Trabajadores

- Headquarters building
- Founded: 1964
- Headquarters: Montevideo, Uruguay
- Location: Uruguay
- Members: 400,000+ (2015)
- Key people: Marcelo Abdala
- Website: www.pitcnt.uy

The Plenario Intersindical de Trabajadores – Convención Nacional de Trabajadores (PIT-CNT) is a national trade union center in Uruguay. It was founded in 1964 as the Convención Nacional de Trabajadores (CNT), but was dissolved, and 18 council members "disappeared", in the wake of a general strike in 1973. Ten years later, in 1983, activities resumed under the name Plenario Intersindical de Trabajadores (PIT), which was then also banned after a general strike in 1984. The union was then restored under the present name in March 1985.

== See also ==
Anti-racist and anti-capitalist feminism protest, 2023

- Uruguayan Regional Workers' Federation, a predecessor of the PIT-CNT
- Trade unions in Uruguay
- Instituto Cuesta Duarte
