= Central Sindical Angolana =

Angolan trade union federation

Central Sindical Angolana ('Angolan Trade Union Centre', CSA) is a trade union centre in Angola. It was previously based in exile in Zaire. CSA is not affiliated to any international trade union confederation.

CSA was founded on September 22, 1973 when two trade union centres merged, the pro-National Liberation Front of Angola Liga Geral dos Trabalhadores de Angola (LGTA) and the Catholic Confederação Geral dos Trabalhadores de Angola (CGTA).
