= Antoni Campañà =

Antoni Campañà i Bandranas (1906 in Arbúcies – 1989 in Sant Cugat del Vallès) was a Catalan photographer, working on the Republican side of the Spanish Civil War.

== Exhibitions ==
2021: La Jonquera, Catalonia

2021: Barcelona, Museu Nacional d'Art de Catalunya

2023: Montpellier, France
