= Instituto Cuesta Duarte =

Labour organization in Uruguay

The Instituto Cuesta Duarte (full name: Instituto Gerardo Cuesta León Duarte, acronym ICUDU) is a nonprofit organization in the framework of the Uruguayan trade unionism. Established in 1989 by the initiative of PIT-CNT, it is a think-tank devoted to labor research, information, diffusion and training. It is led by union leader Milton Castellano.

The institution bears the names of Gerardo Cuesta, a Communist trade unionist who died in 1981, and León Duarte, an Anarchist trade unionist that disappeared in 1976, both during the civic-military dictatorship of Uruguay.
