= Confederación Sindical Latinoamericana =

Latin American trade union

Confederación Sindical Latinoamericana was a Latin American revolutionary trade union confederation 1929–1936, being the Latin American branch of the Red International of Labour Unions (RILU or Profintern). The affiliates of CSLA led significant labour struggles during the period 1935–1936.

Trade unions close to RILU had formed a Comité Pro Confederación Sindical in April 1928. Prominent backers of the initiative were Confederación General del Trabajo del Uruguay, Confederacao Geral do Trabalho do Brasil and Confederacidn Sindical Unitaria de Mexico. In September 1928, the committee issued a call for a continental conference. Prior to the official founding of CSLA, the committee organized a trade unionist conference against the emerging threat of war in the Chaco region on February 25, 1928. The conference was held on the initiative of the Unión Obrera del Paraguay.

CSLA was officially founded in Montevideo, Uruguay, in May 1929. At the founding conference 10 national unions, 2 regional federations and 3 local federations participated, representing Mexico, Colombia, Cuba, Uruguay, Bolivia, Ecuador, Peru, Guatemala, Venezuela, El Salvador, Panama, Brazil, Costa Rica, Argentina and Paraguay.

The CSLA took a strong revolutionary and anti-imperialist line, denouncing the Pan-American Federation of Labor and calling for international proletarian revolution. It spent much of its limited resources on worker education and anti-capitalist propaganda. This commitment to the class struggle led to its being persecuted in most countries with many members imprisoned or executed.

The executive committee of CSLA decided to disband the organisation in 1936, in order to enable the creation of a broader anti-fascist and anti-imperialist unity in the Latin American workers movement. This move reflected the new Popular Front policy of the Communist International. In 1938 Confederación de los Trabajadores de América Latina (CTAL) was formed as a continuation of CSLA.

== See also ==
- Pan Pacific Trade Union Secretariat - another regional organization of the Profintern
