= 1910 Uruguayan parliamentary election =

Parliamentary elections were held in Uruguay on 28 November 1910 to elect all members of the Chamber of Representatives and 7 of the 19 members of the Senate. The main opposition, the National Party did not contest the elections.

== Electoral system ==
The elections were the first held after the introduction of the double simultaneous vote system under law 3640.

Suffrage was limited to literate men. Voting was not secret, as voters had to sign their ballot paper.

== Results ==
=== Chamber of Representatives ===
Party	Votes	%	Seats	+/–
Colorado Party	26,787	86.75	85	+16
Liberal Coalition	3,594	11.64	5	New
Catholic Party	497	1.61	0	New
Total	30,878	100.00	90	+6
Source: Bottinelli et al.

=== Senate ===
Party	Votes	%	Seats
Colorado Party	14,175	90.98	7
Liberal Coalition	1,063	6.82	0
Catholic Party	342	2.20	0
Total	15,580	100.00	7
Source: Bottinelli et al.

== Aftermath ==
Following the elections, members of parliament elected José Batlle y Ordóñez as president on 1 March 1911.
