= Component-based Scalable Logical Architecture =

Component-based Scalable Logical Architecture (CSLA)
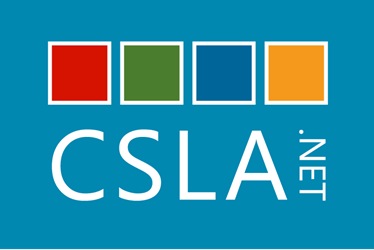
- Stable release: 8.2.7 / 6 September 2024; 23 months ago
- Written in: C#
- Operating system: Windows, macOS, Linux, iOS, Android
- Platform: .NET Core
- Type: Web application framework
- License: MIT License
- Website: www.cslanet.com
- Repository: CSLA Repo

CSLA .NET is a software framework created by Rockford Lhotka that provides a standard way to create robust object-oriented programs using business objects. Business objects are objects that abstract business entities in an object oriented program. Some examples of business entities include sales orders, employees, or invoices.

Although CSLA itself is free to download, the only documentation the creator provides are his books and videos, which are not free.

CSLA (Component-based Scalable Logical Architecture) was originally targeted toward Visual Basic 6 in the book Visual Basic 6.0 Business Objects by Lhotka. With the advent of Microsoft .NET, CSLA was completely rewritten from the ground up, with no code carried forward, and called CSLA .NET. This revision took advantage of web services and the object-oriented languages that came with Microsoft .NET (in particular, Visual Basic.NET and C#).

CSLA .NET was expounded in Expert C# Business Objects and Expert One-on-One Visual Basic .NET Business Objects ISBN 1-59059-145-3, both written by Lhotka. Although CSLA and CSLA .NET were originally targeted toward Microsoft programming languages, most of the framework can be applied to most object-oriented languages.

Current information about CSLA .NET is available through Lhotka's self-published Using CSLA 4 ebook series.

== Features of CSLA ==
=== Smart data ===
A business object encapsulates all the data and behavior (business logic and rules) associated with the object it represents. For example, an OrderEdit object will contain the data and business rule implementations necessary for the application to correctly allow the user to edit order information.

=== Rules engine ===
The CSLA .NET framework provides a rules engine that supports validation rules, business rules, and authorization rules. These rules are attached to object instances or properties, and are automatically invoked by CSLA .NET when necessary. Validation rules may be implemented using the CSLA .NET rule engine, or through the use of the DataAnnotations feature of Microsoft .NET.

=== Object persistence ===
Data creation, retrieval, updates, and deletes (CRUD) are performed by clearly defined methods of the business object associated with the data testing. Data access logic is clearly separated from business logic, typically using a repository pattern or other mainstream object-oriented programming techniques.

=== Metastate maintenance ===
CSLA .NET manages the metastate about each business object. For example, each business object tracks information about when it is new (it represents data that hasn't been saved yet) and when it is dirty (it needs to be saved to the database either because it is new or because its member data has been changed since it was last loaded). Business objects can also be marked for deletion so they can later be deleted (for example when a user has pressed a button confirming his or her intention to delete the rows.)

=== n-Level undo ===
This feature makes it possible for an object or collection of objects to maintain a collection of states. This allows the object to easily revert to previous states. This can be useful when a user wants to undo previous edits multiple times in an application. The feature can also allow a user to redo multiple edits that were previously undone.

This feature can provide rich functionality for desktop application and web applications. One note of caution would be to consider the overhead for high-transaction web-based applications. n-Level undo capability will require storing the previous state of an application generally accessed by reflection. This is common practice in desktop applications where changes must be "Applied". In web based designs, the added storage may pose unnecessary overhead as changes are generally submitted in batch and do not require the same level of "undo" capability.

=== Business rule tracking ===
Allows objects to maintain collections of "broken rule" objects. Broken rules will exist for an object until it is in a valid state, meaning it is ready to be persisted to the database. BrokenRule objects are usually associated with validation logic such as ensuring that no alphabetic characters are entered into a phone number field. For example, if an Account object has a PhoneNumber property, and that property is assigned a phone number with alphabetic characters, the Account object's IsValid property will become false (making it impossible to save to the database) and then a new BrokenRule object will be created and assigned to the Account's Broken Rules collection. The rule will disappear when the invalid phone number is corrected making the Account object capable of saving itself to the database.

== Extended features of CSLA ==
=== Simple UI creation ===
Business objects created using CSLA .NET fully support data binding for all Microsoft .NET UI technologies, including Windows Runtime (WinRT), WPF, Web Forms, ASP.NET MVC, Windows Phone, Silverlight, and Windows Forms. Data-bound controls like DataGrids and ListBoxes can be bound to business objects instead of more generalized database objects like ADO.NET DataSets and DataTables.

=== Distributed data access ===
The CSLA .NET framework implements a concept called mobile objects or mobile agents to allow objects to move across network boundaries using WCF, Web Services, or other technologies. As a result, the data access enjoys location transparency, meaning that the logic may run on the client workstation or server depending on the application's configuration. It can also be configured to use manual database transactions or distributed two-phase commit transactions.

Data access logic is cleanly separated from business logic, and can be implemented using any data access technology available on the Microsoft .NET platform. Examples include ADO.NET Entity Framework, raw ADO.NET, nHibernate, etc.

=== Web Services support ===
Business logic created with the CSLA .NET framework can easily be exposed as a web service to remote consumers. This can be done using server-side Microsoft .NET technologies such as Web API, WCF, and asmx web services.
