= Revolutionary situation =

Concept introduced by Vladimir Lenin

In Marxist terminology, a revolutionary situation is a political situation indicative of a possibility of a revolution. The concept was introduced by Vladimir Lenin in 1913, in his article "Маёвка революционного пролетариата" (Mayovka of the Revolutionary Proletariat). In the article two conditions for a revolutionary situation were described, which were later succinctly phrased as "the bottoms don't want and the tops cannot live in the old way". In later works Lenin postulated a third condition: high political activity of the working masses, their readiness to revolutionary actions.

Lenin describes the "revolutionary situation" as follows:

"To the Marxist it is indisputable that a revolution is impossible without a revolutionary situation; furthermore, it is not every revolutionary situation that leads to revolution. What, generally speaking, are the symptoms of a revolutionary situation? We shall certainly not be mistaken if we indicate the following three major symptoms:

(1) when it is impossible for the ruling classes to maintain their rule without any change; when there is a crisis, in one form or another, among the “upper classes”, a crisis in the policy of the ruling class, leading to a fissure through which the discontent and indignation of the oppressed classes burst forth. For a revolution to take place, it is usually insufficient for “the lower classes not to want” to live in the old way; it is also necessary that “the upper classes should be unable” to rule in the old way;

(2) when the suffering and want of the oppressed classes have grown more acute than usual;

(3) when, as a consequence of the above causes, there is a considerable increase in the activity of the masses, who uncomplainingly allow themselves to be robbed in “peace time”, but, in turbulent times, are drawn both by all the circumstances of the crisis and by the “upper classes” themselves into independent historical action.

Without these objective changes, which are independent of the will, not only of individual groups and parties but even of individual classes, a revolution, as a general rule, is impossible. The totality of all these objective changes is called a revolutionary situation."
