= 1907 Uruguayan parliamentary election =

Parliamentary elections were held in Uruguay on 24 November 1907 to elect all members of the Chamber of Representatives. The main opposition, the National Party did not contest the elections, although some National Party members ran under the "Nationalist Directorate" name.

== Electoral system ==
The elections were held using a majority/minority system, in which the first and second parties in each constituency (based on departments) received a set number of seats, regardless of their vote shares. In Montevideo and constituencies with four seats, three-quarters of the seats were awarded to the first-placed party and one-quarter to the second-placed party. In constituencies with three seats, two were given to the first-placed party and one to the runner-up, as long as the second-placed party received at least 25% of the vote. In Flores Department (which had two seats) the second-placed party had to receive at least 50% of the number of votes received by the first-placed party to win a seat.

Suffrage was limited to literate men. Voting was not secret, as voters had to sign their ballot paper.

== Results ==
Party	Votes	%	Seats	+/–
Colorado Party	28,202	63.54	69	+18
Nationalist Directorate	13,335	30.04	14	New
Civic Reaction	2,801	6.31	1	New
Other parties	47	0.11	0	–
Total	44,385	100.00	84	+13
Source: Bottinelli et al.
