= Anita Garbín =

Spanish anarchist militawoman (1915–1977)

Ana Garbín
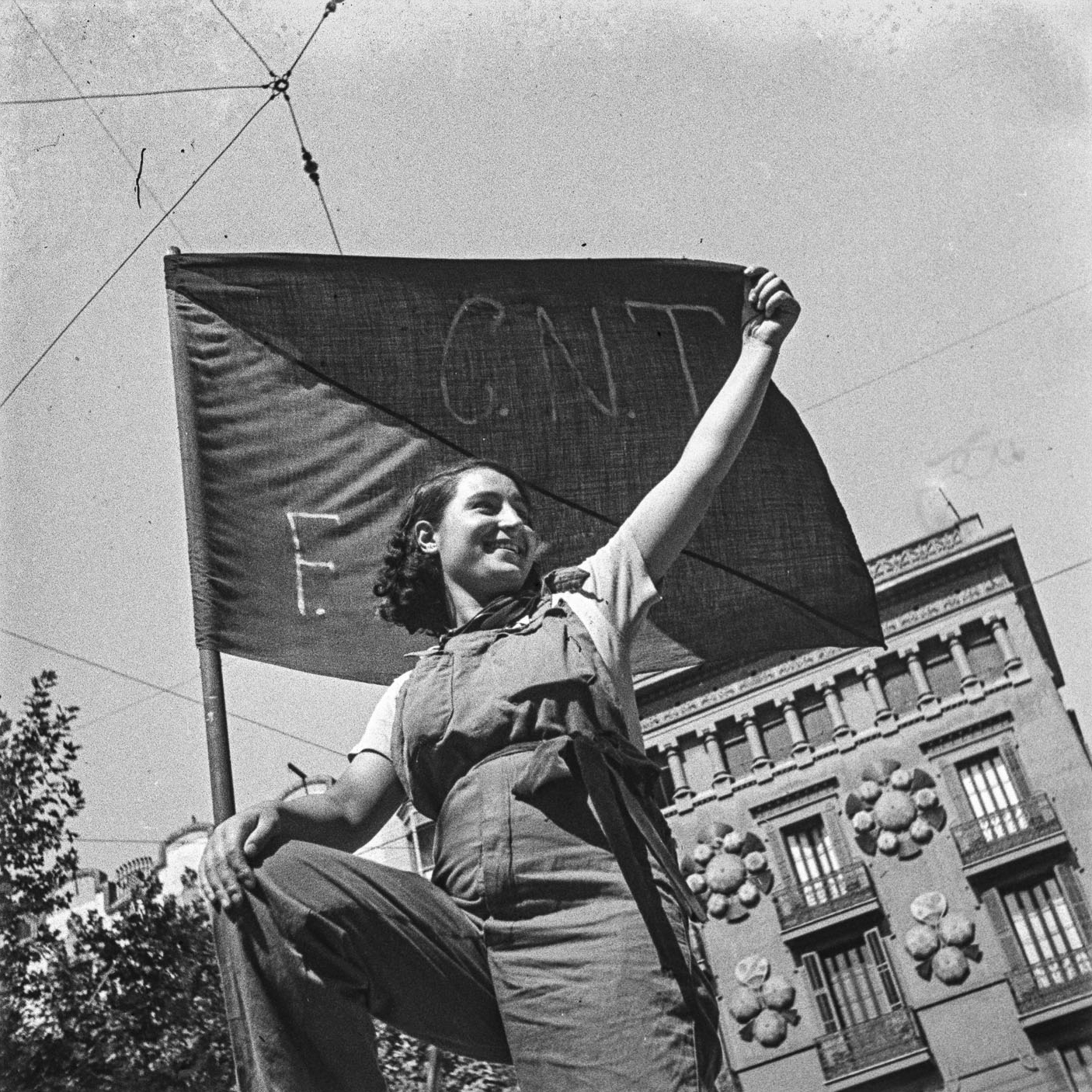
- Garbín in 1936
- Born: Ana Garbín Alonso; 1915; Almería, Andalusia, Spain
- Died: 1977 (aged 61–62); Béziers, Occitania, France
- Movement: Anarchism in Spain
- Spouse: José Lumbreras
- Parents: Manuel Garbín Ibáñez (father); Gabriela Alonso Martínez (mother)

Ana Garbín Alonso (1915–1977), also known as Anita Garbín or the Anarchist Madonna, was a Spanish anarchist dressmaker and militiawoman. She became an icon of the Spanish Civil War because of the photograph taken of her in 1936 by Antoni Campañà.

== Biography ==
Ana Garbín Alonso was born in Almería in 1915, the eldest child of the anarchist railworker Manuel Garbín Ibáñez and the fruit grower Gabriela Alonso Martínez. Garbín's parents soon moved with her to Barcelona, where she went to work as a dressmaker.

Ana Garbín became famous for a photograph taken on 25 July 1936, in Barcelona, during the Spanish Civil War. In this image, Garbín was posing with the flag of the CNT-FAI. The photo would later be known as the Anarchist Madonna. On that day, Campañà was walking along La Rambla when he met Garbín at a barricade on the corner of Carrer de l'Hospital. Seeing the photographer, Garbín posed for him with the flag. She was pregnant at the time of the photograph. Shortly afterwards, Campañà was briefly arrested by a militiaman who mistook him for a spy.

In 1939, Garbín went into exile, crossing the France–Spain border to Béziers. She married the communist José Lumbreras, with whom she had children. Garbín died in 1977 and was buried in the Béziers cemetery.

By the time of her death, the photograph had already been printed on many posters and in books, and Garbín became an icon of the Civil War and a symbol of the Spanish Revolution. The origin of the image and the names of its photographer and subject were unknown until, in 2018, Campañà's heirs revealed a series of photographs that he had hidden for fear of reprisals. When the photographs were exhibited in public, two of Garbín's nephews identified their aunt as the previously anonymous militiawoman in the photograph.

== See also ==
- Anita. La miliciana tenia nom ("Anita. The militiawoman had a name") documentary in Catalan , premiered as the opening film of the 19th Memorimage – International Film Festival of Reus on 6 November 2024.
