= Comité de Unidade de Acção e Coordenação Sindical de Angola =

Angolan trade union alliance

Comité de Unidade de Acção e Coordenação Sindical de Angola ('Trade Union Action and Coordination Unity Committee of Angola', abbreviated CUACSA) was an Angolan trade union alliance in exile, formed through the merger of the National Union of Angolan Workers (UNTA) and the Confederation of Free Trade Unions of Angola (CSLA). CUACSA was founded on June 2, 1964 (62 years ago). The organization was based in Kinshasa. CUACSA had around 200 members. Overall, the organization had little activity. In July 1966 CUACSA fell apart as CSLA withdrew from it.
