= Confederación General del Trabajo del Uruguay =

Trade union confederation in Uruguay

The Confederación General del Trabajo del Uruguay (General Confederation of Labour of Uruguay) was a trade union confederation in Uruguay. It was founded in April 1929, by Bloque de Unidad Obrera. CGTU was politically led by the Communist Party of Uruguay. It was affiliated to the Confederación Sindical Latinoamericana. CGTU disappeared in 1934, as it suffered heavy repression from the Gabriel Terra government.
