= National Union of Angolan Workers =

UNTA
- National Union of Angolan Workers
- União Nacional de Trabalhadores Angolanos
- Founded: 1960
- Location: Angola
- Key people: Manuel Viage (general secretary)
- Affiliations: WFTU

The National Union of Angolan Workers (UNTA) is a national Trade union centre of Angola.

The UNTA was organized first in the Belgian Congo, in the 1960, and moved to Angola after independence in 1975. It is led by Manuel Viage as general secretary.

The UNTA is closely linked to the Popular Movement for the Liberation of Angola (MPLA).
