= August 6 =

August 6 this year in various calendars
- Thursday, 6 August 2026
Akan	Kuruyaw
Armenian	17 Nawasardi 1476
Aztec	Pānquetzaliztli 8, 1 Cōzcacuāuhtli
Babylonian	22 Du'uzu, 2337 SE
Balinese pawukon	Menga, Pasah, Laba, Keliwon, Paniron, Wraspati of Merakih, Indra, Nohan, Manusa
Bengali	22 Shrabon, BS 1433
Chinese	Yang Water Rat・Legs Mansion; Fire Horse Year, Month 6, Day 24 (Dashu, 1 day until Liqiu)
Common Era	6 August 2026 CE
Coptic	30 Epip, AM 1742
Egyptian	22 Choiak, 2775 NE
Ethiopian	30 Ḥamlē, 2018 Amätä Məhrät
French Republican	Décade II, Nonidi de Thermidor de l'Année 234 de la République
Gregorian	6 August, AD 2026
Hebrew	23 Av, AM 5786
Hindu	Bharaṇī・Gaṇḍa; Solar: 21 Śrāvaṇa, 1948 SE; Lunisolar: Aṣṭamī, Kṛishna pakṣa of Āṣāḍha, 2083 VE; Rāudra・5127 KY・1,872,793
Icelandic	Fimmtudagur, 12 Heyannir 2026
Islamic	21 Safar, AH 1448 (using tabular method)
ISO week date	2026-W32-4
Japanese	24 Minazuki, Reiwa 8 (Taisho, 1 day until Risshū)
Julian	24 July, AD 2026 (AM 7534)
Julian day	2461259
Korean	24 Yangdal, 4359 DE
Maya	13.0.13.14.16; 9 Yaxkin, 1 Cib
Roman	ante diem IX Kalendas Augustas, MMDCCLXXIX AUC
Solar Hijri	15 Mordad, SH 1405
Tibetan	23 chu stod, me pho rta 2153 or 1772 or 1000

<<	August					>>
Su	Mo	Tu	We	Th	Fr	Sa
						1
2	3	4	5	6	7	8
9	10	11	12	13	14	15
16	17	18	19	20	21	22
23	24	25	26	27	28	29
30	31
2026

August 6 in recent years
2026 (Thursday)
2025 (Wednesday)
2024 (Tuesday)
2023 (Sunday)
2022 (Saturday)
2021 (Friday)
2020 (Thursday)
2019 (Tuesday)
2018 (Monday)
2017 (Sunday)

August 6 is the 218th day of the year (219th in leap years) in the Gregorian calendar; 147 days remain until the end of the year.

== Events ==
=== Pre-1600 ===
- 258 – Pope Sixtus II is arrested while celebrating mass and then beheaded with several of his deacons.
- 686 – The Umayyad forces suffer a decisive defeat against the pro-Alid forces under Ibrahim ibn al-Ashtar in the battle of Khazir.
- 768 – Antipope Constantine II is deposed and blinded by the Lombard troops of primicerius Christopher.
- 1284 – The Republic of Pisa is defeated in the Battle of Meloria by the Republic of Genoa, thus losing its naval dominance in the Mediterranean.
- 1538 – Bogotá, Colombia, is founded by Gonzalo Jiménez de Quesada.
- 1585 – Toyotomi Hideyoshi is officially appointed kampaku (Imperial Regent).

=== 1601–1900 ===
- 1661 – The Treaty of The Hague is signed by Portugal and the Dutch Republic.
- 1777 – American Revolutionary War: The bloody Battle of Oriskany prevents American relief of the Siege of Fort Stanwix.
- 1787 – Sixty proof sheets of the Constitution of the United States are delivered to the Constitutional Convention in Philadelphia, Pennsylvania.
- 1806 – Francis II, Holy Roman Emperor, declares the moribund empire to be dissolved, although he retains power in the Austrian Empire.
- 1819 – Norwich University is founded in Vermont as the first private military school in the United States.
- 1824 – Peruvian War of Independence: Patriot forces led by Simón Bolívar defeat the Spanish Royalist army in the Battle of Junín.
- 1825 – The Bolivian Declaration of Independence is proclaimed.
- 1861 – Britain imposes the Lagos Treaty of Cession to suppress slavery in what is now Nigeria.
- 1862 – American Civil War: The Confederate ironclad CSS Arkansas is scuttled on the Mississippi River after suffering catastrophic engine failure near Baton Rouge, Louisiana.
- 1870 – Franco-Prussian War: The Battle of Spicheren is fought, resulting in a German victory.
- 1870 – Franco-Prussian War: The Battle of Wörth results in a decisive German victory.
- 1890 – At Auburn Prison in New York, murderer William Kemmler becomes the first person to be executed by electric chair.

=== 1901–present ===
- 1901 – Kiowa land in Oklahoma is opened for white settlement, effectively dissolving the contiguous reservation.
- 1914 – World War I: U-boat campaign: Two days after the United Kingdom had declared war on Germany over the German invasion of Belgium, ten German U-boats leave their base in Heligoland to attack Royal Navy warships in the North Sea.
- 1914 – World War I: Serbia declares war on Germany; Austria declares war on Russia.
- 1915 – World War I: Battle of Sari Bair: The Allies mount a diversionary attack timed to coincide with a major Allied landing of reinforcements at Suvla Bay.
- 1916 – The Paraguayan Regional Workers' Federation reorganizes itself into the Regional Workers' Center of Paraguay.
- 1917 – World War I: Battle of Mărășești between the Romanian and German armies begins.
- 1926 – Gertrude Ederle becomes the first woman to swim across the English Channel.
- 1926 – First public screening using the Vitaphone process
- 1940 – Estonia is annexed by the Soviet Union.
- 1942 – Queen Wilhelmina of the Netherlands becomes the first reigning queen to address a joint session of the United States Congress.
- 1945 – World War II: Hiroshima, Japan is devastated when the atomic bomb "Little Boy" is dropped by the United States B-29 Enola Gay. Around 70,000 people are killed instantly, and some tens of thousands die in subsequent years from burns and radiation poisoning.
- 1956 – After going bankrupt in 1955, the American broadcaster DuMont Television Network makes its final broadcast, a boxing match from St. Nicholas Arena in New York in the Boxing from St. Nicholas Arena series.
- 1958 – Law of Permanent Defense of Democracy, outlawing the Communist Party of Chile and banning 26,650 persons from the electoral lists, is repealed in Chile.
- 1960 – Cuban Revolution: Cuba nationalizes American and foreign-owned property in the nation.
- 1962 – Jamaica becomes independent from the United Kingdom.
- 1965 – US President Lyndon B. Johnson signs the Voting Rights Act of 1965 into law.
- 1986 – A low-pressure system that redeveloped off the New South Wales coast dumps a record 328 millimeters (13 inches) of rain in a day on Sydney, New South Wales, Australia.
- 1990 – Gulf War: The United Nations Security Council orders a global trade embargo against Iraq in response to Iraq's invasion of Kuwait.
- 1991 – Tim Berners-Lee releases files describing his idea for the World Wide Web. WWW makes its first appearance as a publicly available service on the Internet.
- 1991 – Takako Doi, chair of the Social Democratic Party, becomes Japan's first female speaker of the House of Representatives.
- 1996 – NASA announces that the ALH 84001 meteorite, thought to originate from Mars, contains evidence of primitive life-forms.
- 1997 – Korean Air Flight 801 crashed at Nimitz Hill, Guam, killing 229 of the 254 people on board.
- 2001 – Erwadi fire incident: Twenty-eight mentally ill persons tied to a chain are burnt to death at a faith based institution at Erwadi, Tamil Nadu.
- 2008 – A military junta led by Mohamed Ould Abdel Aziz stages a coup d'état in Mauritania, overthrowing president Sidi Ould Cheikh Abdallahi.
- 2009 – Metalworkers at a Ssangyong Motor factory in Pyeongtaek, South Korea agree to end a 77-day strike that culminated in a police raid via helicopters leading to several deaths and arrests.
- 2010 – Flash floods across a large part of Jammu and Kashmir, India, damages 71 towns and kills at least 255 people.
- 2011 – War in Afghanistan: A United States military helicopter is shot down, killing 30 American special forces members and a working dog, seven Afghan soldiers, and one Afghan civilian. It was the deadliest single event for the United States in the War in Afghanistan.
- 2012 – NASA's Curiosity rover lands on the surface of Mars.
- 2015 – A suicide bomb attack kills at least 15 people at a mosque in the Saudi city of Abha.

== Births ==
=== Pre-1600 ===
- 1180 – Emperor Go-Toba of Japan (died 1239)
- 1504 – Matthew Parker, English archbishop (died 1575)
- 1572 – Fakhr-al-Din II, Druze emir (died 1635)

=== 1601–1900 ===
- 1605 – Bulstrode Whitelocke, English lawyer (died 1675)
- 1609 – Richard Bennett, English-American politician, Colonial Governor of Virginia (died 1675)
- 1619 – Barbara Strozzi, Italian composer and singer-songwriter (died 1677)
- 1622 – Tjerk Hiddes de Vries, Dutch admiral (died 1666)
- 1638 – Nicolas Malebranche, French priest and philosopher (died 1715)
- 1644 – Louise de La Vallière, French mistress of Louis XIV (died 1710)
- 1651 – François Fénelon, French archbishop and poet (died 1715)
- 1656 – Claude de Forbin, French general (died 1733)
- 1666 – Maria Sophia of Neuburg (died 1699)
- 1667 – Johann Bernoulli, Swiss mathematician (died 1748)
- 1697 – Charles VII, Holy Roman Emperor (died 1745)
- 1715 – Luc de Clapiers, marquis de Vauvenargues, French author (died 1747)
- 1765 – Petros Mavromichalis, Greek general and politician, 2nd Prime Minister of Greece (died 1848)
- 1766 – William Hyde Wollaston, English chemist and physicist (died 1828)
- 1768 – Jean-Baptiste Bessières, French general and politician (died 1813)
- 1775 – Daniel O'Connell, Irish lawyer and politician, Lord Mayor of Dublin (died 1847)
- 1809 – Alfred, Lord Tennyson, English poet (died 1892)
- 1826 – Thomas Alexander Browne, English-Australian author (died 1915)
- 1835 – Hjalmar Kiærskou, Danish botanist (died 1900)
- 1844 – Alfred, Duke of Saxe-Coburg and Gotha (died 1900)
- 1844 – James Henry Greathead, South African-English engineer (died 1896)
- 1848 – Susie Taylor, American writer and first black Army nurse (died 1912)
- 1846 – Anna Haining Bates, Canadian-American giant (died 1888)
- 1868 – Paul Claudel, French poet and playwright (died 1955)
- 1874 – Charles Fort, American author (died 1932)
- 1877 – Wallace H. White Jr., American lawyer and politician (died 1952)
- 1880 – Hans Moser, Austrian actor and singer (died 1964)
- 1881 – Leo Carrillo, American actor (died 1961)
- 1881 – Alexander Fleming, Scottish biologist, pharmacologist, and botanist, Nobel Prize laureate (died 1955)
- 1881 – Louella Parsons, American journalist (died 1972)
- 1883 – Constance Georgina Adams, South African botanist (died 1968)
- 1883 – Scott Nearing, American economist and educator (died 1983)
- 1886 – Edward Ballantine, American composer and academic (died 1971)
- 1886 – Florence Goodenough, American child psychologist (died 1959)
- 1887 – Dudley Benjafield, English racing driver (died 1957)
- 1889 – George Kenney, Canadian-American general (died 1977)
- 1889 – John Middleton Murry, English poet and author (died 1957)
- 1891 – William Slim, 1st Viscount Slim, English field marshal and politician, 13th Governor-General of Australia (died 1970)
- 1895 – Frank Nicklin, Australian politician, 28th Premier of Queensland (died 1978)
- 1900 – Cecil Howard Green, English-American geophysicist and businessman, co-founded Texas Instruments (died 2003)

=== 1901–present ===
- 1901 – Dutch Schultz, American gangster (died 1935)
- 1903 – Virginia Foster Durr, American civil rights activist (died 1999)
- 1904 – Jean Dessès, Greek-Egyptian fashion designer (died 1970)
- 1904 – Henry Iba, American basketball player and coach (died 1993)
- 1906 – Vic Dickenson, American trombonist (died 1984)
- 1908 – Maria Ludwika Bernhard, Polish classical archaeologist and a member of WWII Polish resistance (died 1998)
- 1908 – Helen Jacobs, American tennis player and commander (died 1997)
- 1908 – Lajos Vajda, Hungarian painter and illustrator (died 1941)
- 1909 – Diana Keppel, Countess of Albemarle (died 2013)
- 1910 – Adoniran Barbosa, Brazilian musician, singer, composer, humorist, and actor (died 1982)
- 1910 – Charles Crichton, English director, producer, and screenwriter (died 1999)
- 1911 – Lucille Ball, American actress, television producer and businesswoman (died 1989)
- 1911 – Norman Gordon, South African cricketer (died 2014)
- 1911 – Constance Heaven, English author and actress (died 1995)
- 1912 – Richard C. Miller, American photographer (died 2010)
- 1914 – Gordon Freeth, Australian lawyer and politician, 24th Australian Minister for Foreign Affairs (died 2001)
- 1916 – Richard Hofstadter, American historian and academic (died 1970)
- 1916 – Dom Mintoff, Maltese journalist and politician, 8th Prime Minister of Malta (died 2012)
- 1917 – Barbara Cooney, American author and illustrator (died 2000)
- 1917 – Robert Mitchum, American actor (died 1997)
- 1918 – Norman Granz, American-Swiss record producer and manager (died 2001)
- 1919 – Pauline Betz, American tennis player (died 2011)
- 1920 – John Graves, American author (died 2013)
- 1920 – Ella Raines, American actress (died 1988)
- 1922 – Freddie Laker, English businessman, founded Laker Airways (died 2006)
- 1922 – Dan Walker, American lawyer and politician, 36th Governor of Illinois (died 2015)
- 1923 – Jess Collins, American painter (died 2004)
- 1923 – Paul Hellyer, Canadian engineer and politician, 16th Canadian Minister of Defence (died 2021)
- 1924 – Samuel Bowers, American white supremacist, co-founded the White Knights of the Ku Klux Klan (died 2006)
- 1924 – Ella Jenkins, American folk singer (died 2024)
- 1926 – Elisabeth Beresford, English journalist and author (died 2010)
- 1926 – Frank Finlay, English actor (died 2016)
- 1926 – Clem Labine, American baseball player and manager (died 2007)
- 1926 – János Rózsás, Hungarian author (died 2012)
- 1926 – Norman Wexler, American screenwriter (died 1999)
- 1928 – Herb Moford, American baseball player (died 2005)
- 1928 – Andy Warhol, American painter, photographer and film director (died 1987)
- 1929 – Mike Elliott, Jamaican saxophonist
- 1929 – Roch La Salle, Canadian politician, 42nd Canadian Minister of Public Works (died 2007)
- 1930 – Abbey Lincoln, American singer-songwriter and actress (died 2010)
- 1931 – Chalmers Johnson, American scholar and author (died 2010)
- 1932 – Michael Deeley, English screenwriter and producer
- 1932 – Howard Hodgkin, English painter (died 2017)
- 1932 – Charles Wood, English playwright and screenwriter (died 2020)
- 1933 – A. G. Kripal Singh, Indian cricketer (died 1987)
- 1934 – Piers Anthony, English-American soldier and author
- 1934 – Chris Bonington, English mountaineer and author
- 1934 – Billy Boston, Welsh rugby player and soldier (died 2026)
- 1935 – Fortunato Baldelli, Italian cardinal (died 2012)
- 1935 – Octavio Getino, Spanish-Argentinian director and screenwriter (died 2012)
- 1937 – Baden Powell de Aquino, Brazilian guitarist and composer (died 2000)
- 1937 – Charlie Haden, American bassist and composer (died 2014)
- 1937 – Barbara Windsor, English actress (died 2020)
- 1938 – Paul Bartel, American actor, director, and screenwriter (died 2000)
- 1938 – Peter Bonerz, American actor and director
- 1938 – Bert Yancey, American golfer (died 1994)
- 1940 – Mukhu Aliyev, Russian philologist and politician, 2nd President of Dagestan
- 1940 – Egil Kapstad, Norwegian pianist and composer (died 2017)
- 1940 – Louise Sorel, American actress
- 1941 – Ray Culp, American baseball player
- 1942 – Byard Lancaster, American saxophonist and flute player (died 2012)
- 1943 – Jon Postel, American computer scientist and academic (died 1998)
- 1944 – Inday Badiday, Filipino journalist and actress (died 2003)
- 1944 – Michael Mingos, English chemist and academic
- 1944 – Martin Wharton, English bishop
- 1945 – Ron Jones, English director and production manager (died 1993)
- 1946 – Allan Holdsworth, English guitarist, songwriter, and producer (died 2017)
- 1947 – Radhia Cousot, French computer scientist and academic (died 2014)
- 1949 – Dino Bravo, Italian-Canadian wrestler (died 1993)
- 1950 – Dorian Harewood, American actor
- 1951 – Catherine Hicks, American actress
- 1951 – Daryl Somers, Australian television host and singer
- 1952 – Pat MacDonald, American singer-songwriter and guitarist
- 1952 – David McLetchie, Scottish lawyer and politician (died 2013)
- 1952 – Ton Scherpenzeel, Dutch keyboard player, songwriter, and producer
- 1954 – Mark Hughes, English-Australian rugby league player
- 1956 – Bill Emmott, English journalist and author
- 1957 – Bob Horner, American baseball player (died 2026)
- 1957 – Jim McGreevey, American lawyer and politician, 52nd Governor of New Jersey
- 1958 – Randy DeBarge, American singer-songwriter and bass player
- 1959 – Rajendra Singh, Indian environmentalist
- 1959 – Joyce Sims, American singer (died 2022)
- 1960 – Dale Ellis, American basketball player
- 1961 – Mary Ann Sieghart, English journalist and radio host
- 1962 – Michelle Yeoh, Malaysian-Hong Kong actress and producer
- 1963 – Charles Ingram, English soldier, author, and game show contestant
- 1963 – Kevin Mitnick, American computer security consultant, author, and convicted hacker (died 2023)
- 1964 – Kemi Omololu-Olunloyo, Nigerian journalist, activist, social media expert, and pharmacist
- 1965 – Stéphane Peterhansel, French racing driver
- 1965 – Yuki Kajiura, Japanese pianist and composer
- 1965 – David Robinson, American basketball player and lieutenant
- 1966 – Regina Carter, American jazz and classical violinist, and composer
- 1968 – Jack de Gier, Dutch footballer
- 1969 – Simon Doull, New Zealand cricketer and sportscaster
- 1969 – Elliott Smith, American singer-songwriter and guitarist (died 2003)
- 1970 – M. Night Shyamalan, Indian-American director, producer, and screenwriter
- 1972 – Geri Halliwell, English singer-songwriter, dancer, and actress
- 1972 – Jason O'Mara, Irish actor
- 1973 – Vera Farmiga, American actress
- 1973 – Stuart O'Grady, Australian cyclist
- 1975 – Jason Crump, English-Australian motorcycle racer
- 1975 – Renate Götschl, Austrian skier
- 1975 – Víctor Zambrano, Venezuelan baseball player
- 1976 – Soleil Moon Frye, American actress
- 1976 – Melissa George, Australian-American actress
- 1977 – Leandro Amaral, Brazilian footballer
- 1977 – Jimmy Nielsen, Danish footballer and manager
- 1977 – Luciano Zavagno, Argentinian footballer
- 1979 – Francesco Bellotti, Italian cyclist
- 1979 – Jaime Correa, Mexican footballer
- 1979 – Travis Reed, American basketball player
- 1981 – Leslie Odom Jr., American actor and singer
- 1981 – Diána Póth, Hungarian figure skater
- 1983 – Robin van Persie, Dutch footballer
- 1984 – Vedad Ibišević, Bosnian footballer
- 1984 – Maja Ognjenović, Serbian volleyball player
- 1984 – Jesse Ryder, New Zealand cricketer
- 1985 – Mickaël Delage, French cyclist
- 1985 – Bafétimbi Gomis, French footballer
- 1985 – Garrett Weber-Gale, American swimmer
- 1986 – Raphael Pyrasch, German rugby player
- 1987 – Leanne Crichton, Scottish footballer
- 1991 – Wilmer Flores, Venezuelan baseball player
- 1991 – Jiao Liuyang, Chinese swimmer
- 1995 – Rebecca Peterson, Swedish tennis player
- 1999 – Hunter Greene, American baseball player
- 1999 – Rebeka Masarova, Spanish-Swiss tennis player
- 2002 – Nessa Barrett, American singer-songwriter
- 2004 – Takhmina Ikromova, Uzbekistani rhythmic gymnast

== Deaths ==
=== Pre-1600 ===
- 258 – Pope Sixtus II
- 523 – Pope Hormisdas (born 450)
- 750 – Marwan II, Umayyad general and caliph (born 688)
- 1027 – Richard III, Duke of Normandy
- 1162 – Ramon Berenguer IV, Count of Barcelona (born 1113)
- 1195 – Henry the Lion, Duke of Saxony and Bavaria (born 1129)
- 1221 – Saint Dominic, Spanish priest, founded the Dominican Order (born 1170)
- 1272 – Stephen V of Hungary (born 1239)
- 1384 – Francesco I of Lesbos
- 1412 – Margherita of Durazzo, Queen consort of Charles III of Naples (born 1347)
- 1414 – Ladislaus of Naples (born 1377)
- 1458 – Pope Callixtus III (born 1378)
- 1530 – Jacopo Sannazaro, Italian poet (born 1458)
- 1553 – Girolamo Fracastoro, Italian physician (born 1478)
- 1588 – Josias I, Count of Waldeck-Eisenberg, Count of Waldeck-Eisenberg (1578–1588) (born 1554)

=== 1601–1900 ===
- 1628 – Johannes Junius, German lawyer and politician (born 1573)
- 1637 – Ben Jonson, English poet and playwright (born 1572)
- 1645 – Lionel Cranfield, 1st Earl of Middlesex, English merchant and politician (born 1575)
- 1657 – Bohdan Khmelnytsky, Ukrainian soldier and politician, 1st Hetman of Zaporizhian Host (born 1595)
- 1660 – Diego Velázquez, Spanish painter and educator (born 1599)
- 1666 – Tjerk Hiddes de Vries, Frisian naval hero and commander (born 1622)
- 1679 – John Snell, Scottish-English soldier and philanthropist, founded the Snell Exhibition (born 1629)
- 1694 – Antoine Arnauld, French mathematician and philosopher (born 1612)
- 1695 – François de Harlay de Champvallon, French archbishop (born 1625)
- 1753 – Georg Wilhelm Richmann, Estonian-Russian physicist and academic (born 1711)
- 1757 – Ádám Mányoki, Hungarian painter (born 1673)
- 1794 – Henry Bathurst, 2nd Earl Bathurst, English lawyer and politician, Lord High Chancellor of Great Britain (born 1714)
- 1815 – James A. Bayard, American lawyer and politician (born 1767)
- 1828 – Konstantin von Benckendorff, Russian general and diplomat (born 1785)
- 1850 – Edward Walsh, Irish poet (born 1805)
- 1866 – John Mason Neale, English priest, scholar, and hymnwriter (born 1818)
- 1881 – James Springer White, American religious leader, co-founded the Seventh-day Adventist Church (born 1821)
- 1893 – Jean-Jacques Challet-Venel, Swiss lawyer and politician (born 1811)

=== 1901–present ===
- 1904 – Eduard Hanslick, Austrian author and critic (born 1825)
- 1906 – George Waterhouse, English-New Zealand politician, 7th Prime Minister of New Zealand (born 1824)
- 1915 – Jennie de la Montagnie Lozier, American physician (born 1841)
- 1920 – Stefan Bastyr, Polish pilot and author (born 1890)
- 1925 – Surendranath Banerjee, Indian academic and politician (born 1848)
- 1925 – Gregorio Ricci-Curbastro, Italian mathematician (born 1853)
- 1931 – Bix Beiderbecke, American cornet player, pianist, and composer (born 1903)
- 1945 – Richard Bong, American soldier and pilot, Medal of Honor recipient (born 1920)
- 1945 – Hiram Johnson, American lawyer and politician, 23rd Governor of California (born 1866)
- 1946 – Tony Lazzeri, American baseball player and coach (born 1903)
- 1952 – Betty Allan, Australian statistician and biometrician (born 1905)
- 1959 – Preston Sturges, American director, screenwriter, and playwright (born 1898)
- 1964 – Cedric Hardwicke, English actor and director (born 1893)
- 1968 – Ye Gongchuo, Chinese politician, poet, and calligrapher (born 1881)
- 1969 – Theodor W. Adorno, German sociologist and philosopher (born 1903)
- 1970 – Nikos Tsiforos, Greek director and screenwriter (born 1912)
- 1973 – Fulgencio Batista, Cuban colonel and politician, 9th President of Cuba (born 1901)
- 1976 – Gregor Piatigorsky, Russian-American cellist and educator (born 1903)
- 1978 – Pope Paul VI (born 1897)
- 1978 – Edward Durell Stone, American architect, designed Radio City Music Hall and the Kennedy Center for the Performing Arts (born 1902)
- 1979 – Feodor Felix Konrad Lynen, German biochemist and academic, Nobel Prize laureate (born 1911)
- 1983 – Klaus Nomi, German singer-songwriter and actor (born 1944)
- 1985 – Forbes Burnham, Guyanese politician, 2nd President of Guyana (born 1923)
- 1986 – Emilio Fernández, Mexican actor, director, and screenwriter (born 1904)
- 1987 – Ira C. Eaker, American general (born 1896)
- 1990 – Jacques Soustelle, French anthropologist and politician (born 1912)
- 1991 – Shapour Bakhtiar, Iranian soldier and politician, 74th Prime Minister of Iran (born 1915)
- 1991 – Roland Michener, Canadian lawyer and politician, 20th Governor General of Canada (born 1900)
- 1991 – Harry Reasoner, American journalist, co-created 60 Minutes (born 1923)
- 1992 – Leszek Błażyński, Polish boxer (born 1949)
- 1993 – Tex Hughson, American baseball player (born 1916)
- 1994 – Domenico Modugno, Italian singer-songwriter and politician (born 1928)
- 1997 – Shin Ki-ha, South Korean lawyer and politician (born 1941)
- 1998 – André Weil, French-American mathematician and academic (born 1906)
- 2001 – Jorge Amado, Brazilian novelist and poet (born 1912)
- 2001 – Adhar Kumar Chatterji, Indian Naval officer (born 1914)
- 2001 – Wilhelm Mohnke, German general (born 1911)
- 2001 – Shan Ratnam, Sri Lankan physician and academic (born 1928)
- 2001 – Dorothy Tutin, English actress (born 1930)
- 2002 – Edsger W. Dijkstra, Dutch physicist, computer scientist, and academic (born 1930)
- 2003 – Julius Baker, American flute player and educator (born 1915)
- 2004 – Rick James, American singer-songwriter and producer (born 1948)
- 2004 – Donald Justice, American poet and academic (born 1925)
- 2005 – Robin Cook, Scottish educator and politician, Secretary of State for Foreign and Commonwealth Affairs (born 1946)
- 2005 – Creme Puff, tabby domestic cat, oldest recorded cat (born 1967)
- 2007 – Zsolt Daczi, Hungarian guitarist (born 1969)
- 2008 – Angelos Kitsos, Greek lawyer and author (born 1934)
- 2009 – Riccardo Cassin, Italian mountaineer and author (born 1909)
- 2009 – Willy DeVille, American singer-songwriter and guitarist (born 1950)
- 2009 – John Hughes, American director, producer, and screenwriter (born 1950)
- 2011 – Fe del Mundo, Filipino pediatrician and educator (born 1911)
- 2012 – Richard Cragun, American-Brazilian ballet dancer and choreographer (born 1944)
- 2012 – Marvin Hamlisch, American pianist, composer, and conductor (born 1944)
- 2012 – Robert Hughes, Australian-American author and critic (born 1938)
- 2012 – Bernard Lovell, English physicist and astronomer (born 1913)
- 2012 – Mark O'Donnell, American playwright (born 1954)
- 2012 – Ruggiero Ricci, American violinist and educator (born 1918)
- 2012 – Dan Roundfield, American basketball player (born 1953)
- 2013 – Stan Lynde, American author and illustrator (born 1931)
- 2013 – Mava Lee Thomas, American baseball player (born 1929)
- 2013 – Jerry Wolman, American businessman (born 1927)
- 2014 – Ralph Bryans, Northern Irish motorcycle racer (born 1941)
- 2014 – Ananda W.P. Guruge, Sri Lankan scholar and diplomat (born 1928)
- 2014 – John Woodland Hastings, American biochemist and academic (born 1927)
- 2015 – Ray Hill, American football player (born 1975)
- 2015 – Orna Porat, German-Israeli actress (born 1924)
- 2017 – Betty Cuthbert, Australian sprinter (born 1938)
- 2017 – Darren Daulton, American baseball player (born 1962)
- 2018 – Joël Robuchon, French Chef (born 1945)
- 2018 – Margaret Heckler, American politician (born 1931)
- 2018 – Anya Krugovoy Silver, American poet (born 1968)
- 2020 – Vern Rumsey, American bass guitarist (born 1973)
- 2024 – Billy Bean, American baseball player (born 1964)
- 2024 – Connie Chiume, South African actress and filmmaker (born 1952)
- 2024 – James Bjorken, American theoretical physicist (born 1934)

== Holidays and observances ==
- Christian holidays and observances
  - Transfiguration of Jesus
  - Anna Maria Rubatto
  - Felicissimus and Agapitus
  - Pope Hormisdas
  - Justus and Pastor
  - Pope Sixtus II
  - August 6 (Eastern Orthodox liturgics)
- Sheikh Zayed bin Sultan Al Nahyan's Accession Day. (United Arab Emirates)
- Independence Day (Bolivia), celebrates the independence of Bolivia from Spain in 1825.
- Independence Day (Jamaica), celebrates the independence of Jamaica from the United Kingdom in 1962.
- Hiroshima Peace Memorial Ceremony (Hiroshima, Japan)
- Russian Railway Troops Day (Russia)
