= Asociación Continental Americana de Trabajadores =

Latin American trade union confederation (1929–1941)

American Continental Workers' Association
- Asociación Continental Americana de los Trabajadores
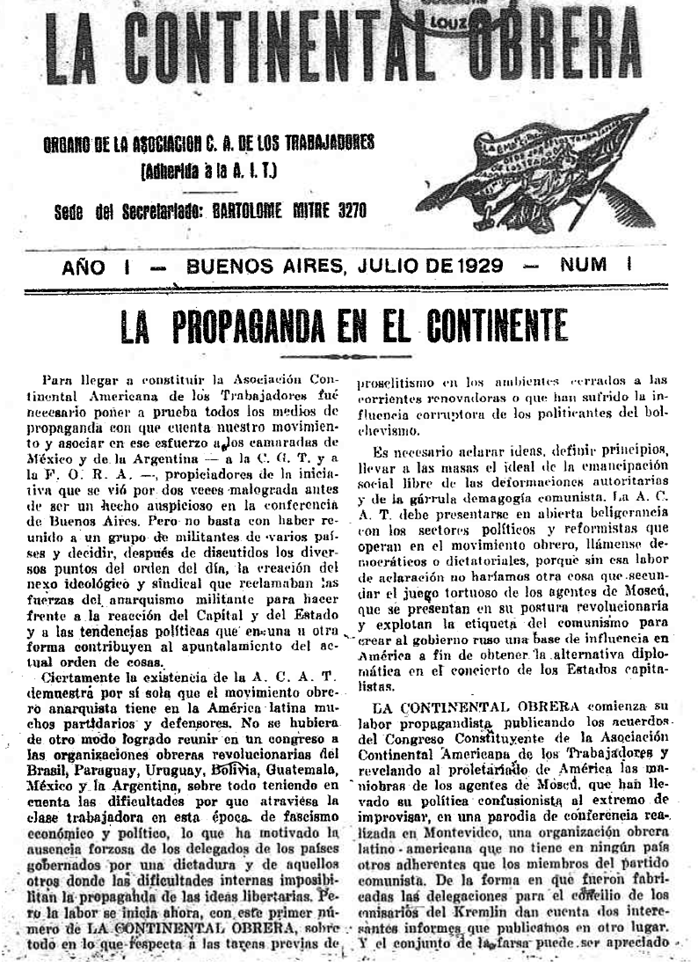
- First issue of La Continental, the official organ of the ACAT
- Abbreviation: ACAT
- Established: May 1929; 97 years ago
- Dissolved: 1941; 85 years ago
- Type: International trade union federation
- Headquarters: Buenos Aires (1929–1932); Montevideo (1932–1941)
- Region served: Latin America
- General Secretary: Manuel Villar (1929–1932)
- Main organ: La Continental Obrera
- Affiliations: International Workers' Association
- Website: acat-ait.org

The American Continental Workers' Association (Spanish: Asociación Continental Americana de Trabajadores; (Note: Also translated as Continental American Workers' Association, American Continental Association of Workers or Continental American Association of Workers.) ACAT) was an international trade union federation based in Latin America during the 1930s. Founded in 1929 following a series of initiatives by the Argentine Regional Workers' Federation (FORA) and the Mexican General Confederation of Workers (CGT-M), the ACAT sought to unite the various anarcho-syndicalist federations of Latin America in order to coordinate their actions, with the ultimate goal of establishing anarchist communism. Soon after its founding, the ACAT faced a number of difficulties accomplishing its objectives, as the rise of dictatorships throughout Latin America prevented its member sections from continuing their trade union activities and stunted international coordination. After the 1930 Argentine coup d'état, the ACAT was forced to move its headquarters from Buenos Aires to Uruguay, where it continued publishing its magazine La Continental Obrera. By the mid-1930s, the ACAT was already effectively defunct. In 1941, it ceased publication of La Continental and dissolved itself. Over the subsequent decades, the FORA made a series of attempts to reconstitute the ACAT, but these were all unsuccessful.

== Background ==
=== Latin American anarcho-syndicalism ===
During the 1870s, the first branches of the International Workingmen's Association (IWMA) were established throughout Latin America. In most countries, these groups were largely focused on carrying out propaganda work in existing mutual aid societies, but in Argentina, Mexico and Uruguay, the IWMA established a more solid and lasting foundation. Most of the Latin American IWMA branches came under the influence of Mikhail Bakunin, leading to the growth of anarchism and anarcho-syndicalism in the region. Anarchist political philosophy was well-received by the Latin American industrial working-class, which was largely employed in small workshops rather than large factories, resulting in more direct and personal relations between workers and employers. Latin American anarchists rejected the use of collective bargaining, which had been adopted by many industrial workers in Europe and North America, as they believed to be a mechanism for class collaboration. Instead, they adopted the anarchist tactic of direct action, which involved class conflict with employers rather than negotiations with them. Following this method, anarchist unions presented workers' demands to an employer and gave them a deadline to meet them; if the demands were not met by this time, the workers would go on strike. If the employers continued to refuse the workers' demands, other methods of direct action such as boycotts, sabotage and sympathy strikes would be carried out, with the possibility of escalating into a general strike. As anarchists sought to eliminate the state and considered it the state to inherently be on the side of employers, they also rejected government mediation in industrial disputes.

Although anarcho-syndicalists were united on the use of direct action, they disagreed on whether anarchist unions should seek to establish anarchist communism: the Argentine Regional Workers' Federation (FORA) called for the eventual establishment of anarchist communism, and a number of other anarcho-syndicalist federations followed its example; but others, including the Brazilian Workers' Confederation (COB), made no commitment to a specific ideological goal. Another issue of disagreement was whether unions should employ union representatives: the FORA refused to accept this, arguing that union representatives would inevitably end up engaging in the exploitation of labor of the union rank-and-file; but the COB and the Uruguayan Regional Workers' Federation (FORU) argued for the retention of union representatives. Different interpretations also existed of the anarchist theory of autonomy. However, it was generally accepted that individuals were autonomous within their unions, unions were autonomous within their federations, and federations were autonomous within their national trade union centers. Most Latin American anarcho-syndicalists were sharply critical of the model of industrial unionism, advocated by the North American Industrial Workers of the World (IWW), which divided workers into industrial unions which it held would take control of their respective industries following a social revolution. Although the IWW would establish branches in Chile and Mexico, most Latin American anarchists argued that the IWW was too centralised to be considered a truly anarchist union federation.

=== Early coordination attempts ===
The most influential of the national trade union centers in Latin America was the FORA, established in 1901, which came to dominate the Argentine labor movement in the early 20th century. The FORA inspired the creation of similar national trade union centers in other countries, including the Mexican Regional Workers' Confederation (CORM), the Paraguayan Regional Workers' Federation (FORPa), the Peruvian Regional Workers' Federation (FORPe), and the Uruguayan Regional Workers' Federation (FORU). Different models of trade union federation were also established in other countries, including the Brazilian Workers' Confederation (COB), the Mexican General Confederation of Workers (CGT-M) and the Chilean General Confederation of Workers (CGT-C). The IWW also had its own sections in Chile (IWW-C) and Mexico (IWW-M). The COB, FORA, and FORU quickly established links with each other, but they faced difficulties developing sustained relationships between all anarcho-syndicalist organizations in Latin America. This was due in part to a lack of financial resources, as well as a general skepticism of bureaucracy and sustained political repression against each organization.

The FORA attempted to organize a continental anarcho-syndicalist congress, set for Buenos Aires in 1910, but it was cancelled after the FORA was outlawed. During World War I, delegates of the FORA and COB attended anti-war conferences in Ferrol and Rio de Janeiro. This set the groundwork for closer international coordination between anarcho-syndicalist organisations, although the COB would itself be shut down in 1917 following the Brazilian entry into the war. Trade unions representing specific crafts and industries had more success hosting continental congresses, with maritime transport workers' unions holding two international congresses during the 1920s. The second of these congresses, presided over by delegates from the Chilean IWW, played host to a series of disputes between anarchist and communist delegates. By the time a continental anarcho-syndicalist congress was finally organised, anarcho-syndicalism had already lost its influence over the Latin American labor movement. Industrial workers were increasingly being employed in large factories, which necessitated the establishment of the collective bargaining procedures that anarcho-syndicalists had historically argued against. Left-wing political parties, which sought material improvements to living and working conditions, had also gained an influence over the labor movement. The establishment of the US-led Pan-American Federation of Labor (PAFL) and later the communist-aligned Confederación Sindical Latinoamericana (CSLA) provided further incentive for Latin American anarcho-syndicalist organizations to unite.

== Establishment ==
During the mid-1920s, the FORA began issuing calls to other anarcho-syndicalist organizations for a continental congress. On the initiative of the CGT-M, a congress was convened to take place in Panama in May 1925, but it was ultimately never held due to pressure by the United States on the government of Panama. In May 1927, a second attempt was made to hold a congress in Buenos Aires, but it was only attended by delegates from the FORA, FORU and the Regional Workers' Center of Paraguay (CORP). Two years later, the initiatives of the FORA and CGT-M finally culminated in a continental anarcho-syndicalist congress, which was successfully held in Buenos Aires in May 1929. Delegates in attendance represented the FORA, CORP, CGT-M and FORU, as well as the Brazilian Confederação Nacional do Trabalho (CNT), Bolivian Local Workers' Federation (FOL) and the Guatemalan Comité Pro Acción Sindical (CPAS), while indirect delegates represented a number of smaller groups in Bolivia, Costa Rica, Peru and the United States. The Chilean IWW also sent delegates, but by this time, it had been forced underground by the dictatorship of Carlos Ibáñez del Campo. Discussions at the congress signalled hope that groups living under the dictatorships in Chile, Colombia and Peru would later be able to affiliate to the proposed continental association.

At the Buenos Aires congress, the American Continental Workers' Association (Spanish: Asociación Continental Americana de los Trabajadores; ACAT) was established. The ACAT declared its goal to be the replacement of the state with a free association of producers, the abolition of capitalism and the establishment of social and economic equality. It declared its ultimate aim to be the establishment of anarchist communism. The ACAT proclaimed that its methods would be in concordance with its aims, and that they would involve carrying out boycotts, strike actions and sabotage in solidarity with its different member sections. It rejected the seizure of state power, instead focusing its attentions on organizing workers to seize the means of production. The ACAT opposed collective bargaining and labor laws, which it held to be forms of class collaboration, and proclaimed its opposition to politics, rejecting any alliance with political parties or reformist trade unions. It also upheld federalism and voluntary association from the bottom-up as the basis of trade union organizing. Acknowledging the various cultural, economic and political differences between different Latin American nations, the ACAT sought to preserve the local autonomy of each of its national affiliates rather than centralizing control of them. It called for the study of indigenous and immigrant precursors to anarchism, as well as the particular national conditions and the diversity of the Latin American working class. It also encouraged the development of national movements within each cultural context, solutions to land reform based on regional particularities and the cultivation of anti-imperialism. The ACAT distanced itself from the industrial unionist model of the IWW and excluded the IWW from its ranks, due to its perceived rejection of federalism, opposition to internationalism and tendency towards reformism. ACAT claimed that the North American IWW was seeking to establish itself internationally from the top-down, which the ACAT held to be irreconcilable with its decentralist and federalist principles.

The congress finally elected three people to serve on the secretariat of the ACAT and established a federal council with one representative from each national trade union center, each of which would be based at the headquarters of the ACAT. These central organisations were tasked with publicising the aims and objectives of the ACAT through its official organ, La Continental Obrera, which was established in July 1929. The Argentine anarchist Manuel Villar was elected as secretary of the ACAT and went on to edit La Continental Obrera, until his deportation from Argentina in 1932. Under the influence of Augustin Souchy, the general secretary of the International Workers' Association (AIT), the ACAT also affiliated itself to the AIT. In the years following the congress, workers' organizations from 13 countries would affiliate themselves to the ACAT. From its first issue, La Continental Obrera invited contributions from anarchists throughout Latin America, with the aim of strengthening the ACAT. Much of the publication's efforts were focused on criticizing its rivals in the CSLA and PAFL, which they respectively denounced as fronts for the Soviet and United States governments. It initially remained optimistic about the development of anarchism in Latin America, believing that the anti-authoritarian traditions of the indigenous peoples of the Americas provided a strong foundation for the growth of the anarchist movement. Although later the publication would grow more cautious about the development of anarchism, due to the rise of authoritarian governments in the region.

== Decline and dissolution ==
Immediately after its founding, the ACAT faced a series of difficulties that prevented it from functioning as a cohesive international organization. In September 1930, a coup d'état in Argentina established a military dictatorship which suppressed the FORA and prevented the ACAT from using its headquarters in Buenos Aires. The following month, a revolution in Brazil established a personalist dictatorship under Getúlio Vargas, who suppressed the anarcho-syndicalist movement in favor of creating a government-approved trade union center. In 1931, the Maximato dictatorship in Mexico passed a new labor law that required trade unions to obtain government recognition, causing a split in the CGT-M into factions that favored collaboration or continued to uphold anarcho-syndicalism. That same year, Jorge Ubico seized power in Guatemala and established a military dictatorship, which suppressed the country's anarcho-syndicalist movement. In 1932, the Chaco War broke out between Bolivia and Paraguay, resulting in the suppression of the labor movement in both countries; although the anarcho-syndicalists would retain their influence over the Bolivian labor movement until the Revolution of 1952, their leading position in Paraguay was displaced by the Paraguayan Communist Party (PCP). Divisions between the ACAT and its European counterparts in the IWA also escalated, with ACAT representative Diego Abad de Santillán having to defend the ACAT's position on agrarian socialism from criticisms by Lucien Huart and Pierre Besnard of the Revolutionary Syndicalist General Confederation of Labour (CGT-SR), who were staunch advocates of industrialisation.

The rise of dictatorship throughout Latin America prevented the ACAT from consolidating itself as an organization. Through its magazine La Continental, which had a circulation of 10,000 subscribers and was distributed for free, the ACAT issued proclamations about various events in Latin America: in July 1932, the ACAT condemned the dictatorship of Luis Miguel Sánchez Cerro in Peru for its massacre of indigenous laborers; and in January 1933, it denounced an anti-war conference held by the Communist International in Montevideo, which it saw as an attempt to strengthen the influence of Bolshevism in the continent. Meanwhile, the dictatorship of José Félix Uriburu in Argentina had forced the ACAT to move its headquarters to Uruguay, where it resumed publication of La Continental in September 1932. By the mid-1930s, the ACAT existed more on paper than in practice, and anarcho-syndicalism was being superseded by Bolshevism. It continued to publish its magazine until 1941, before dissolving at the height of World War II. In 1948, the FORA attempted to reorganize the ACAT and received interest from a number of other anarcho-syndicalist groups, but its planned reorganization congress was never held. Reorganization attempts continued, with the Cuban Libertarian Association inviting Liberto Forti, a delegate of the FORA, to Havana in September 1949 to discuss it. Despite these attempts, no second continental congress was convened. In March 1954, the Argentine anarchist Carlos Kristof Fiala was arrested in Venezuela; he had allegedly been tasked by the FORA with contacting other Latin American trade unions to reconstitute the ACAT.

In February 1960, La Continental was revived by members of the FORA and FORU, with the aim of reestablishing the ACAT. They believed that, as reformism and class collaboration had become normalized in the Latin American labor movement, it was necessary to reestablish a continental association that could push for anarchist communism. As with previous attempts, nothing ultimately resulted from this call to revive the ACAT. By the late 20th century, anarcho-syndicalism had almost entirely lost its influence over the Latin American labor movement. In 1997, another attempt to reconstitute the ACAT was also unsuccessful.

== Affiliates ==
- (Argentina) Argentine Regional Workers' Federation (FORA)
- (Brazil) National Confederation of Labor (CNT)
- (Bolivia) Local Workers' Federation (FOL)
- (Costa Rica) Agrupación Obrera de Estudios Sociales (AOES)
- (Guatemala) Comité Pro Acción Sindical (CPAS)
- (Mexico) General Confederation of Workers (CGT)
- Regional Workers' Center of Paraguay (CORP)
- (Uruguay) Uruguayan Regional Workers' Federation (FORU)

== Bibliography ==
- Alexander, Robert J.; Parker, Eldon M. (2009). "Anarchosyndicalist Unions and ACAT". International Labor Organizations and Organized Labor in Latin America and the Caribbean: A History. ABC-Clio. pp. 1–10. ISBN 978-0-275-97739-9.
- Cappelletti, Angel J. (2018). Anarchism in Latin America. Translated by Gabirel Palmer-Fernández. Edinburgh: AK Press. ISBN 9781849352826. OCLC 1044939183.
- De Laforcade, Geoffroy (2011). "Straddling The Nation And The Working World: Anarchism And Syndicalism On The Docks And Rivers Of Argentina, 1900–1930". In Hirsch, Steven; van der Walt, Lucien (eds.). Anarchism and Syndicalism in the Colonial and Postcolonial World, 1870-1940. Brill. pp. 321–362. doi:10.1163/ej.9789004188495.i-432.88. ISBN 978-90-04-18848-8.
- Herrerín, Ángel (2020). The Road to Anarchy: The CNT under the Spanish Second Republic (1931–1936). Sussex Academic Press. ISBN 9781789760316.
- Monteflores, Omar Lucas (2020). "Anarchism and the Indigenous Peoples of Guatemala: A Tenuous Relation". Anarchist Studies. 28 (2): 76–92. doi:10.3898/AS.28.2.04. ISSN 2633-8270.
- Montes de Oca, Rodolfo (2019). Venezuelan Anarchism: The History of a Movement. See Sharp Press. ISBN 9781947071377.
- Poy, Lucas (2020). "Working Class Politics and Labour Internationalism in Latin America: An Overview of Labour International Organisations in the Region During the Interwar Period (1919-1939)". In Belluci, Stefano; Weis, Holger (eds.). The Internationalisation of the Labour Question: Ideological Antagonism, Workers' Movements and the ILO since 1919. Palgrave MacMillan. pp. 165–189. ISBN 978-3-030-28234-9.
- Rocker, Rudolf (1989) [1938]. Anarcho-Syndicalism. Pluto Press. ISBN 0-7453-1392-2.
- Rosenthal, Anton (2017). "Moving between the Global and the Local: The Industrial Workers of the World and their Press in Latin America". In de Laforcade, Geoffroy; Shaffer, Kirwin R. Shaffer (eds.). In Defiance of Boundaries: Anarchism in Latin American History. University Press of Florida. pp. 72–94. ISBN 978-0-8130-6110-8.
- Thorpe, Wayne (1989). The Workers Themselves. Kluwer Academic Publishers. ISBN 0-7923-0276-1. LCCN 89-8205.
- Thorpe, Wayne (2006). "El Ferrol, Rio de Janeiro, Zimmerwald, and Beyond: Syndicalist Internationalism, 1914-1918". Revue belge de philologie et d'histoire. 84 (4): 1005–1023.
- van der Walt, Lucien; Schmidt, Michael (2009). "Roads to Revolution: Mass Anarchism versus Insurrectionist Anarchism". Black Flame: The Revolutionary Class Politics of Anarchism and Syndicalism. Edinburgh: AK Press. pp. 123–148. ISBN 978-1-904859-16-1. LCCN 2006933558. OCLC 1100238201.
- Wätzold, Tim (2014). "Nostra patria é il mondo intero: Libertarian Internationalism in the Era of Mass Migration and the Development of the South American Labour Movement (1870-1920)". Moving the Social: Journal of Social History & the History of Social Movements (52): 171–197. doi:10.13154/mts.52.2014.171-197. ISSN 2197-0386.
