= Ramón Ayala (disambiguation) =

Ramón Ayala (Ramón Covarrubias Garza, born 1945) is a Mexican Norteño singer and accordion player.

Ramón Ayala may also refer to:

- Ramón Ayala (American musician) (born 1928), American accordion player
- Ramón Ayala (Argentine musician) (1927–2023), Argentine singer and poet
- Ramón Ayala Rodríguez (born 1976), birth name of Puerto Rican musician Daddy Yankee
- Ramón Ayala (judoka) (born 1979), Puerto Rican judoka
