= Taking of Encarnación =

1931 revolutionary occupation in Paraguay

- Taking of Encarnación (Paraguay)
- Date: February 20, 1931
- Location: Encarnación, Paraguay
- Goals: Social revolution: Establishment of a commune in Encarnación; Creation of an anarcho-syndicalist society in Paraguay
- Methods: Occupation
- Result: Occupation failed: Insurrectionists flee to Brazil

Parties
Anarchists; Communists	Paraguay; Armed Forces of Paraguay; Encarnación Military Garrison; Local Police Department of Itapúa

Lead figures
Obdulio Barthe; Félix Aracuyú; Facundo Duarte	José Guggiari

Casualties
- Arrested: 17

The Taking of Encarnación was an attempted anarchist occupation of Encarnación, Paraguay, in February 1931 as part of a larger plan to initiate a social revolution in the country.

== Event ==
As part of a larger plan to initiate a libertarian (anarchist) social revolution in Paraguay, a group of workers and students attempted to proclaim a libertarian commune in Encarnación on February 20, 1931. They entered Paraguay by crossing the Paraná River from Posadas, Argentina. Led by Obdulio Barthe, Félix Cantalicio Aracuyú, and Facundo Duarte, and propelled by the Nuevo Ideario Nacional, 150 anarchists and communists occupied Encarnación for 16 hours. A stray bullet from the occupation left Aracuyú badly wounded.

The other components of the planned popular revolution, in Asunción and Villarrica, were foiled as their labor leaders were deported in the days preceding the action. Following the occupation, the insurrectionists took over two steamboats, which they rode to exile in Brazil, stopping to attack yerba mate companies and burn records related to indentured mensús in two ports. The 17 who remained in Encarnación were arrested.

== Legacy ==
While the occupation itself was marred by incompetence, it represented both widespread discontent among workers and students as well as the influence of anarcho-syndicalism and its main vessel, the weekly La Palabra. Following the 1931 uprising, anarchism's influence waned and was supplanted by socialist thought. Novelist Gabriel Casaccia alluded to the occupation in his Los Hederos.
