= Obdulio Barthe =

Paraguayan trade unionist (1903–1981)

- Born: 5 September 1903; Encarnación, Paraguay
- Died: 1981 (aged 77–78); Buenos Aires, Argentina
- Occupation: Politician
- Years active: 1920–1981
- Known for: Encarnación Commune
- Political party: Paraguayan Communist Party

Obdulio Barthe (1903–1981) was a Paraguayan Communist and syndicalist politician. In 1931, he was one of the leaders in the Encarnación Commune.

== Biography ==
Obdulio Barthe was born in 1903, the son of Domingo Barthe. His father was a French businessman who owned a yerba mate company in southern Paraguay; he was denounced by journalist Julián Bouvier for the harsh working conditions there, which Bouvier compared to slavery.

During the 1920s, Obdulio Barthe became a young leader of the student movement. In December 1928, Barthe wrote a eulogy to the Spanish-Paraguayan journalist Rafael Barrett for the paper Impulso. In August 1929, Barthe and his colleague Oscar Creydt published an anarchist manifesto, the New National Ideology, which called for a social revolution in Paraguay. The two envisioned an anarcho-syndicalist society, based on a decentralized network of trade unions and workers' councils, and believed revolution in Paraguay would require the native Guarani people to confront the colonial elites. In October 1930, they founded a newspaper, La Palabra, to spread their ideas. It gained a wide readership among trade unionists and students, publishing 15 issues until January 1931.

In February 1931, Barthe led an uprising in Encarnación and took control of the city, briefly establishing an anarchist commune there. But after a construction workers' general strike in Asunción was suppressed, the Encarnación rebels quit the city. Barthe subsequently commandeered boats owned by his father's company, burned the company archives along the Paraná River and escaped into Brazil.

Following the uprising, Barthe and Oscar Creydt established the Council of Workers and Students at the National University of Asunción. At the outbreak of the Chaco War, members of the Paraguayan Communist Party (PCP) attempted to form links with the council for a joint anti-war campaign. The council was sympathetic to communism, but its anarchist members opposed affiliation with any political parties. Negotiations between the two led to the formation of a joint committee, which issues proclamations denounced the Chaco War. The Paraguayan government then began cracking down on left-wing activists, nearly dismantling the PCP. At a conference in Lobos in 1934, Barthe and Creydt refounded the PCP under their own leadership. They continued to oppose the war, advocating for it to be transformed into a social revolution.

After the February Revolution of 1936, Barthe was expelled from the country by decree of the Rafael Franco dictatorship. Barthe later went on to lead the communist revolutionaries in Concepción during the Paraguayan Civil War of 1947. After the rise of the Alfredo Stroessner dictatorship, Barthe insisted that the regime could only be brought down by force, although by 1963, guerrilla activities had largely ceased. By this time, Bather had broken with Creydt over the latter's refusal to collaborate with the Communist Party of Cuba. During the Sino-Soviet split, Barthe led a pro-Soviet faction within the PCP against Creydt's pro-China faction. Barthe died in 1981.

== See also ==
- Anarchism in Paraguay

== Bibliography ==
- Costa, William, ed. (2024). Paraguayan Sorrow: Writings of Rafael Barrett, A Radical Voice in a Dispossessed Land. Monthly Review Press. ISBN 978-1-68590-078-6.
- Halperin, Ernst (1967). "Peking and the Latin American Communists". The China Quarterly. 29: 111–154. doi:10.1017/s0305741000047937. hdl:1721.1/81841.
- Kheifets, Lazar; Kheifets, Victor (2012). "The "International of Moscow" or the "International of Buenos Aires"? The Comintern and the Paraguayan Communist Party". The International Newsletter of Communist Studies. 18 (25): 123–136. ISSN 1862-698X.
- Lambert, Peter; Medina, Ricardo (2007). "Contested Discourse, Contested Power: Nationalism and the Left in Paraguay". Bulletin of Latin American Research. 26 (3): 339–355. doi:10.1111/j.1470-9856.2007.00228.x.
- Lambert, Peter; Nickson, R. Andrew, eds. (2012). The Paraguay Reader: History, Culture, Politics. Duke University Press. ISBN 9780822352686.
- Medina, Ricardo (1997). "The Left". In Lambert, Peter; Nickson, Andrew (eds.). The Transition to Democracy in Paraguay. Latin American Studies Series. Palgrave Macmillan. pp. 72–86. doi:10.1007/978-1-349-25767-6_5. ISBN 978-1-349-25767-6.
- Nickson, R. Andrew (1993). "BARTHE, Obdulio". Historical Dictionary of Paraguay (2nd ed.). Metuchen, N.J.: Scarecrow Press. pp. 65–66. ISBN 978-0-8108-2643-4.
