= Ignacio Núñez Soler =

Paraguayan artist (1891–1983)

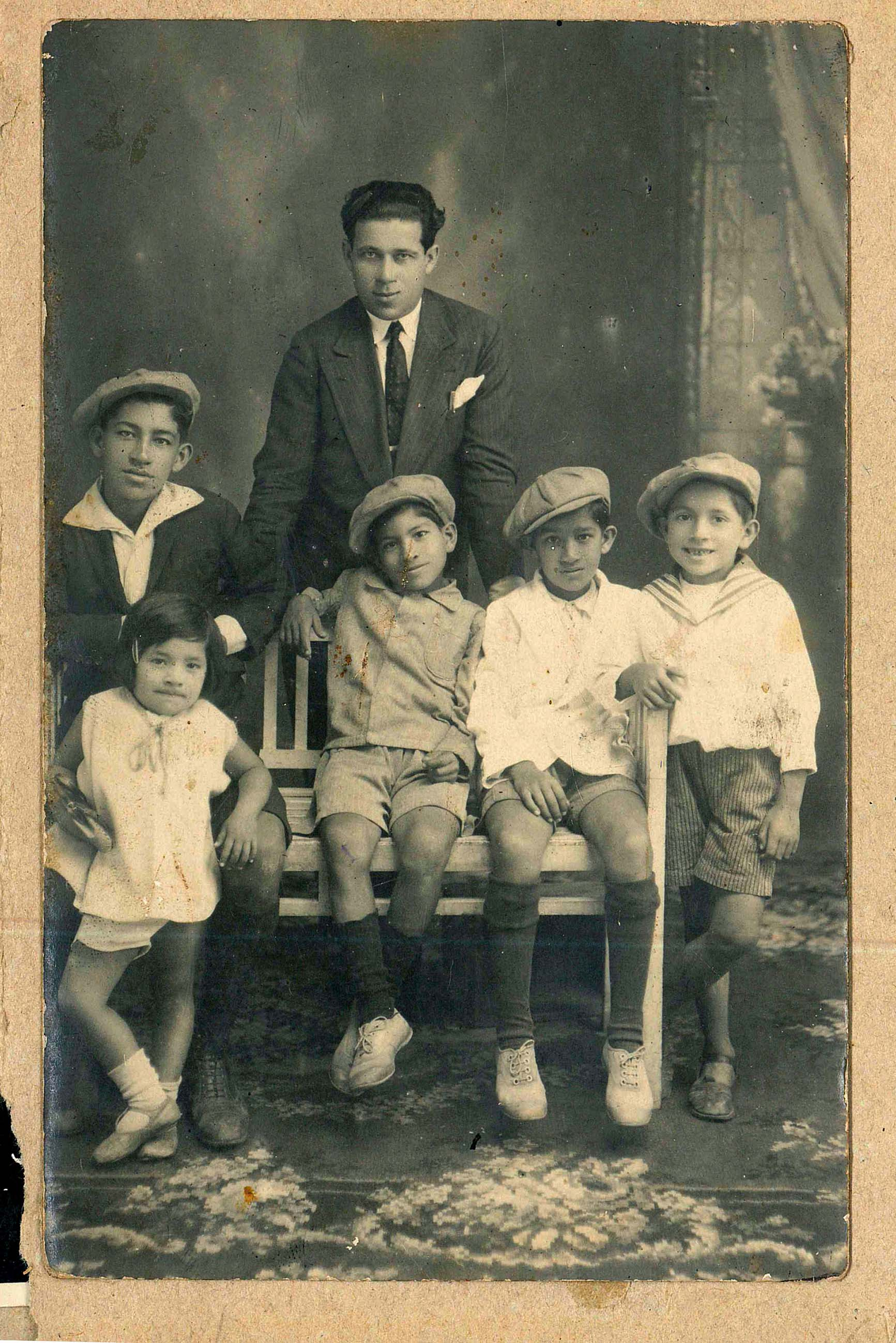
- Ignacio Núñez Soler and his children
- Born: Ignacio Núñez Soler; 31 July 1891; Asunción, Paraguay
- Died: 13 October 1983 (aged 92); Asunción, Paraguay
- Known for: Painting
- Notable work: "Las “burreras" "La Plaza “Uruguaya"

Ignacio Núñez Soler (1891–1983) was a Paraguayan artist and anarchist.

== Biography ==
Ignacio Núñez Soler was born in 1891. Núñez was the first general secretary of the Regional Workers' Center of Paraguay (CORP), an anarcho-syndicalist trade union center founded in 1916.

A self-taught artist, he became one of Paraguay's foremost modernist painters. Although he had no contact with the established modernist movement himself, his work developed in parallel with it. His work displayed a nostalgia for Asunción's past, depicting political events or popular celebrations that had changed the city's urban identity. Unlike other modernists, he sought out short-cuts to achieve his desired outcomes and mixed together avant-garde styles with popular culture. His work unintentionally echoed themes from primitivism, including the works of Henri Rousseau. It also displayed his own version of naïve art.

He died in 1983. His work is exhibited in the Museo del Barro, in Asunción. In 2002, his work was the subject of a study by Roberto Amigo for the book Guerra, anarquía y goce.

== Selected works ==
- Evocaciones de un sindicalista revolucionario (Asunción, 1980)

== See also ==
- Anarchism in Paraguay

== Bibliography ==
- Díaz-Duhalde, Sebastián J. (2018). "Interrupted Visions of History: Nineteenth-Century Illustrated Newspapers and the History of (Popular) Art in Contemporary Paraguay". In Pous, F.; Quin, A.; Viera, M. (eds.). Authoritarianism, Cultural History, and Political Resistance in Latin America. Memory Politics and Transitional Justice. Palgrave Macmillan. pp. 125–148. doi:10.1007/978-3-319-53544-9_7. ISBN 978-3-319-53543-2.
- Elkins, James (2010). "Writing About Modernist Painting Outside Western Europe and North America". The Journal of Transcultural Studies. 1 (1): 42–77. doi:10.11588/ts.2010.1.1928.
- Escobar, Ticio (2011). "Parallel Modernities. Notes on Artistic Modernity in the Southern Cone of Latin America: The Case of Paraguay". Art in Translation. 3 (1). Translated by Macartney, Hilary: 87–120. doi:10.2752/175613111X12877376766266.
- Guerrero, Jorge Carlos (2010). "Rewriting in Roa Bastos's Late Fiction". In Weldt-Basson, H. C. (ed.). Postmodernism's Role in Latin American Literature. Palgrave Macmillan. pp. 189–209. doi:10.1057/9780230107939_9. ISBN 978-1-349-38061-9.
- Nickson, Andrew (1989). "Paraguay". In Carrière, Jean; Haworth, Nigel; Roddick, Jacqueline (eds.). The State, Industrial Relations and the Labour Movement in Latin America. Vol. 1. Palgrave Macmillan. pp. 67–98. doi:10.1007/978-1-349-05905-8_3. ISBN 978-1-349-05907-2.
- Nickson, R. Andrew (1993). "Centro Obrero Regional del Paraguay". Historical Dictionary of Paraguay. Rowman & Littlefield. pp. 108–109. ISBN 9780810879645.
- Quevedo, Charles (2020). "The Brazilian Cultural Mission and the Arte Nuevo Group: A Regional Dispute for Cultural Hegemony and Paraguayan Modern Art". Artelogie. 15 (15). doi:10.4000/artelogie.4582.
