= Nuevo Ideario Nacional =

1929 Paraguayan revolutionary proclamation

Nuevo Ideario Nacional (New National Ideology) is a 1929 insurrectionist proclamation made by young intellectuals of Paraguay that called for a libertarian (anarchist) social revolution to create an anarcho-syndicalist society.

== Contents ==
The Nuevo Ideario Nacional called for a social revolution to create an anarcho-syndicalist society governed by decentralized popular assemblies and labor unions. It denounced existing Paraguayan political structures, Marxism, and the Nationalist Period's authoritarianism. The Nuevo Ideario Nacional wrote that present political parties and parliamentary politics served the elite rather than the people, and that the social revolution would become an ethnic conflict between the rural Guarani-speaking people and the European-influenced elite.

== Publication ==
Young Paraguayan intellectuals published the proclamation in Asunción, Paraguay's capital city, in August 1929. It spread through the anarcho-syndicalist weekly newspaper La Palabra, which published 15 issues from the capital between October 1930 and January 1931. Students and militant trade unionists readily absorbed its ideas as international capitalism and internal laissez-faire economic policy lost currency.

== Legacy ==
Nuevo Ideario Nacional and its opposition, the Liga Nacional Independiente were the major intellectual forces of Paraguay's Liberal Period. The movement climaxed with the failed Taking of Encarnación in February 1931, which failed in conjunction with an aborted construction worker-led general strike in Asunción. The utopianism of Nuevo Ideario Nacional gradually dissipated in favor of more immediate politics, including rising interest in Marxism among the proclamation's adherents in the 1930s. Two of the proclamation's signatories would later lead the Partido Comunista Paraguayo.
