= Anarchism in Paraguay =

Anarchism in Paraguay has held influence among the urban and rural working classes since the end of the 19th century. Its main figure was the writer and journalist Rafael Barrett.

== Beginnings ==
The anarchists were active in the graphic, railway and baker's unions as early as 1889, organizing the fight for the 8-hour workday. On March 1 of that year, the railway workers declared a strike of significant proportions, other guilds soon followed. On May 21, 1892, the first libertarian manifesto was published, edited by the group "Los Hijos del Chaco": they declared themselves anarcho-communist and intended to abolish private property, the clergy, the State and the armed forces. At the same time, several libertarian unions were organized, particularly among carpenters. In 1900, the Italian anarchist Pietro Gori, temporarily based in Argentina, drafted the statute of the bricklayers union. The carpenters eventually achieved the 8-hour day in 1901, after a week on strike. During this time, Spanish and Argentine immigrants played an important role in spreading the anarchist ideal in Paraguay.

== 20th century ==
The Paraguayan Regional Workers Federation was founded on April 22, 1906, organized under the anarcho-syndicalist model of the FORA. It declared itself opposed to all political parties, proposing to fight for the "Federation of Associates and Free Producers" as its objective. Its mouthpiece was the newspaper El Despertar. The anarchists in Paraguay were particularly influential among the peasants, even organizing "Societies in Armed Resistance" to confront landowners.

Rafael Barret was the outstanding figure of the movement; From his magazine Germinal "he described the social tragedy of the Paraguayan worker, denounced the inhuman exploitation which the peasants were subjected to, practicing a form of investigative journalism that was advanced for his time. His articles included: "What are the grasslands", "The Argentine terror", "My anarchism", "Eloquence", "The Paraguayan pain", etc. He arrived in Paraguay in 1904 from Argentina, as a correspondent for the newspaper El Tiempo. In 1908 he was forced into exile in Montevideo and died of tuberculosis in 1910.

Another renowned Paraguayan cultural figure was Ignacio Núñez Soler, a prominent Paraguayan anarchist and visual artist. In 1916 he founded, together with Leopoldo Ramos Giménez, Modesto Amarilla, Manuel Núñez and others, a working-class entity called May Day, whose social insignia was a black flag. Based on this organization, the Regional Workers' Center of Paraguay (CORP) was later created, which organized branches in almost all the cities and towns of Paraguay and published journals such as: El Combate, Renewal, Human Protest and Prometheus.

During the first decade of the 20th century, the newspapers La Rebelión, La Tribuna and Towards the Future were published. Between 1920 and 1926, Renovation was published. The FORP and the Combate group published brochures by Rafael Barret. In 1928, the anarchists founded the Revolutionary Nationalist Alliance, whose strategy was the implantation of a "Common Republic" and the "Federalist Union of the Peoples of Latin America". On February 20, 1931, a student-worker group led by Obdulio Barthe took the city of Encarnación declaring it a "revolutionary commune", under the leadership of popular assemblies. This was just a stage in a plan to start a libertarian socialist revolution throughout Paraguay. Anarchists that participated in this episode included Félix Cantalicio Aracuyú, Ramón Durán, Ciriaco Duarte, Juan Verdi, etc.

Anarchists also differed from other trends because they posed new problems, such as their way of life, expressed, for example, in a manifesto to Paraguayan workers: “We want love to be free and not as it happens nowadays, where beings who have never loved each other unite for life (...) we also want, since we are not born by the will of our parents, that children belong to the great human family”. The anarchists consequently continued the criticism of the religious mystification that the liberals had initiated since the 19th century and that the ruling bourgeoisie had toned down for the sake of a coexistence with the Catholic Church, which held great influence in Latin America.

— Luis Vitale

== 21st century ==
The resurgence of anarchism took much longer in Paraguay than in other Latin American countries, prolonged due to the radical right-wing movement that took hold of Paraguayan society as a result of the Chaco War and a series of military dictatorships. In the first years of the 21st century, anarchist tendencies began to be noticed in punk counterculture groups and individuals related to social and cultural struggles. Squatters opened "La Terraza" and "Ñande", and the anarchist social center "The Commune of Emma Chana And all the others". Anarchists also published periodicals such as Autonomía Zine, Diatriba, Periférica, Grito Fanzine, Abstruso, Kupi'i fanzine and the Agitation Without Permission newspaper. Graffiti on the capital's walls and the presence of anarchist flags in marches and demonstrations in recent years demonstrate the awakening of some interest in individuals towards libertarian tendencies that begin to interact with left-wing groups and social sectors.

== See also ==
- Category:Paraguayan anarchists
- List of anarchist movements by region
