= Ramón Ayala (Argentine musician) =

Argentinian singer (1927–2023)

Ramón Ayala Ramón Gumercindo Cidade
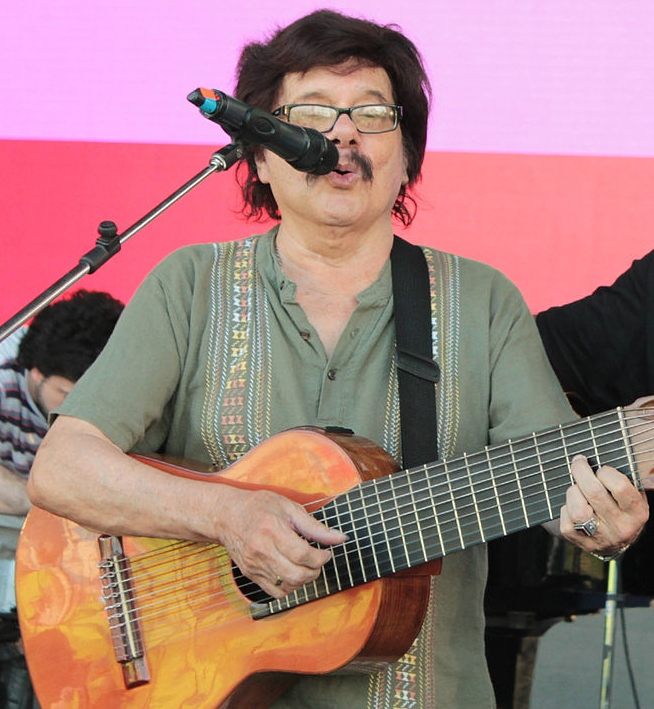
- Ayala in 2014

Background information
- Born: March 10, 1927; Garupá, Misiones, Argentina
- Origin: Misiones, Argentina
- Died: December 7, 2023 (aged 96) Buenos Aires, Argentina
- Genres: Music of Argentina
- Occupations: Singer, writer and poet
- Instruments: Guitar, voice
- Years active: 1960–2023

Ramón Gumercindo Cidade (March 10, 1927 – December 7, 2023), better known as Ramón Ayala, was an Argentine singer, writer and poet. His music and prose are strongly identified with the culture of his home province.

Ayala decided to create his own musical style, which he called "Gualambao"; (which is formed by two polka rhythms chained by a permanent syncopation, which gives a particular appearance). It is written in 12/8 (twelve eighths), meaning that each bar has 12 eighth notes spread out over 4 times.

Among his best-known songs is "El Mensú" – whose lyrics speak of the mensú: the farmers and workers – which was such a success in Argentina and Latin America that his song was even performed by the Argentine-Cuban revolutionary Che Guevara in 1962, during a tour of Cuba by the singer.

Throughout his career, Ayala made presentations in Spain, Sweden, France, Italy, Romania, Cyprus, Uganda, Kenya, Tanzania, Lebanon, Turkey, Kuwait, Iraq, Iran, Bahrain and other Middle Eastern countries, performing concerts and exhibitions of paintings.

His nephew, Guillermo "Walas" Cidade, is the lead singer and songwriter of the skate punk band, Massacre.

Ramón Ayala died after a bout of pneumonia on December 7, 2023, at the age of 96.
