= Leopoldo Ramos Giménez =

Paraguayan journalist, poet and politician (1891–1988)

- Born: 14 October 1891; Villarrica, Paraguay
- Died: 5 January 1988 (aged 96); Asunción, Paraguay
- Occupations: Journalist, poet
- Political party: Colorado Party

Leopoldo Ramos Giménez (1891–1988) was a Paraguayan journalist, poet and politician.

== Biography ==
Leopoldo Ramos Giménez was born on 14 October 1891 in the Paraguayan city of Villarrica. His father had been a supporter of Francisco Solano López during the Paraguayan War and raised Ramos Giménez to be a fervent Paraguayan nationalist. At a young age, he became involved in the Paraguayan labor movement and gravitated towards the political philosophy of anarchism, a position he continued to uphold even after joining the nationalist Colorado Party. He began his career as a poet and journalist writing for local newspapers in Villarrica, but at the age of 15, he started submitting articles to the national newspaper Crónica, which was based in the Paraguayan capital of Asunción. He was a prominent critic of mensú yerba mate plantation worker treatment, and was wounded in an assassination attempt in 1916. His first collection of libertarian poems, Piras sagradas, was noted to have taken a "violent social tone", but his stance became less combative in his later works.

He eventually became the head of Paraguay's National Publishing Company. Following the February Revolution of 1936, Ramos Giménez proposed the creation of an album of bibliographic testimony of Paraguayan history, for the occasion of the inauguration of the National Pantheon of the Heroes. Its publication was authorised by a decree in October 1936 and his publishing company was given public funding to deliver 25 copies of the album, which was titled Apotheosis. His aim with the album was the consecration of Solano López as a Paraguayan national hero, in a reversal of the political settlement imposed on Paraguay by Brazil after the 1865 war. In poetry he composed for the album, he depicted Solano López as a divine figure.

During the dictatorship of Alfredo Stroessner, Ramos Giménez served as undersecretary of information and culture. He died on 5 January 1988 in Asunción.

== Selected works ==
- Piras sagradas, Asunción, 1917 - (Sacred pyres)
- Eros, Asunción, 1918 - (Eros)
- Alas y sombras, Buenos Aires, 1919 - (Wings and shadows)
- Cantos del solar heroico, Asunción, 1920 - (Heroic songs of the sun)
- Canto a las palmeras de Río de Janeiro, Río de Janeiro, 1932. - (Song of the palms of Rio de Janeiro) Collection of de verses.
- Tabla de sangre, libro de combate, contra el régimen de esclavitud imperante en los yerbales y obrajes del Alto Paraná, Asunción, 1919 - (Table of blood, book of combat against the regime of slavery prevailing in the mate plantations mills of Alto Parana)
- La bestia blanca, Asunción, 1919 - (The white beast)
- En el centenario del mariscal López, polémica histórica, San Pablo, 1927 - (In the centenary of Marshal López, historical controversy)
- La yerba mate, Asunción, 1931 - (The yerba matte)
- El Brasil, su desarrollo económico-industrial, Río de Janeiro, 1932 - (Brazil, its economic and industrial development)
- Siembra blanca, campaña de aproximación paraguayo-brasilera, Río de Janeiro, 1932 - (White Sowing, Paraguayan-Brazilian campaign approach)
- El hierro y otros metales en el Paraguay - (Iron and other metals in Paraguay)
- Historia cartográfica del Chaco, Buenos Aires, 1935 - (Cartographic history of the Chaco)
- El Chaco Boreal en la historia y en nuestros días, Buenos Aires, 1934 - (The Boreal Chaco in history and today)

== See also ==
- Anarchism in Paraguay

== Bibliography ==
- Caballero Campos, Herib (2015). "Entre el recuerdo y la reivindicación: Apoteosis, el álbum conmemorativo de la inauguración del Panteón Nacional de los Héroes" [Between memory and claim: Apotheosis, the memorial album of the inauguration of the National Pantheon of the Heroes]. Folia Histórica del Nordeste (in Spanish). 24: 115–130. ISSN 0325-8238.
- Cappelletti, Angel (2017). Anarchism in Latin America. Chico, CA: AK Press. ISBN 978-1-84935-282-6.
- Carriere, Jean; Haworth, Nigel; Roddick, Jacqueline (1989). The State, Industrial Relations and the Labour Movement in Latin America: Volume 1. Springer. ISBN 978-1-349-05905-8.
