= Regional Workers' Center of Paraguay =

Paraguayan trade union center

- Centro Obrero Regional del Paraguay
- Abbreviation: CORP
- Predecessor: Paraguayan Regional Workers' Federation
- Established: 6 August 1916; 110 years ago
- Dissolved: 1934; 92 years ago
- Type: National trade union center
- Location: Paraguay
- General Secretary: Ignacio Núñez Soler
- Main organ: Renovación
- Affiliations: American Continental Workers' Association

The Regional Workers' Center of Paraguay (Spanish: Centro Obrero Regional del Paraguay; CORP) was a Paraguayan trade union center. Founded in 1916 as the successor to the Paraguayan Regional Workers' Federation (FORP), the CORP organized workers throughout the country, at a time when the Paraguayan export market was flourishing. It led several strike actions by workers on the Asunción tram network, culminating in a general strike in 1921. It also participated in the founding of the American Continental Workers' Association (ACAT), together with other Latin American anarcho-syndicalist federations. By the late 1920s, the CORP started losing influence to socialist and communist-led trade unions. The CORP dissolved during the Chaco War (1932–1935), with some of its members joining the ranks of the Paraguayan Communist Party (PCP).

== Establishment ==
The Paraguayan labor movement was founded during the late 19th century, with the country's first trade unions being established during the first years of the 1900s. The first national trade union center, the Paraguayan Regional Workers' Federation (FORP), was established by anarcho-syndicalists in 1906. Internal divisions between the anarchist and socialist factions of the FORP culminated in 1912, when the socialists split off and established the Unión Gremial del Paraguay (UGP). Following the outbreak of World War I in 1914, a sustained economic depression in Paraguay caused the collapse of the trade union movement, with both the UGP and FORP becoming inactive. By 1916, an increased demand for agricultural exports brought growth back to the Paraguayan economy, leading to a subsequent revival of the trade union movement, with several new trade unions being established. The FORP then reorganized itself. On 6 August 1916, nine of the FORP's trade union sections came together to establish a new trade union federation: the Regional Workers' Center of Paraguay (Spanish: Centro Obrero Regional del Paraguay; CORP). Ignacio Núñez Soler was appointed as its first general secretary.

== Activities ==
The CORP adopted a modified version of the FORP's anarchist platform and published the newspaper El Combate, which was edited by Juan Deilla. According to Paraguayan historian Milda Rivarola, the European and Argentine migrant workers who had made up the majority of the FORP's leadership were replaced by native Paraguayans. The CORP quickly revived the Paraguayan trade union movement, organizing workers in the country's agricultural, meat-packing, railroad and tannin industries. The CORP also established local federations in Concepción, Encarnación and Villarrica. Less than a year after the CORP was founded, on 6 June 1917, the liberal government of Benigno Ferreira introduced the country's first labor law, which established a workweek and weekend. By the end of World War I, the CORP had grown substantially, establishing trade union centers in major towns and cities throughout the country. It began publication of the newspaper El Surco, which included space for articles in the Guarani language; it was later succeeded by the "communist-federalist" newspaper Renovación.

The CORP successfully elicited support for strike actions from secondary school and university students, in a first for Paraguayan history. Together with the socialist Unión Gremial del Paraguay (UGP), the CORP provided funds for theatre plays that portrayed social issues. The CORP established links with the Argentine Regional Workers' Federation (FORA), the North American branch of the Industrial Workers of the World (IWW), and the Uruguayan Regional Workers' Federation (FORU). In early 1920, attempts were made to merge the CORP together with the socialist-led Paraguayan Workers' Federation (FOP), but members of the CORP pulled out of the unification committee. The CORP also established unions among dockworkers, who were largely organized around the Naval Federation (FN) and often came into conflict with Argentine dockworkers.

Soon after it was established, the CORP supported a railroad workers' strike, which achieved its demands, although many of the union leaders were imprisoned. In 1916, the CORP also supported a strike action by workers on the Asunción tram network, who demanded wage increases, although this was broken up by the police and many of the striking workers were arrested. Tram workers led another strike for four months in 1917, but this too was suppressed by the police and the tram workers' union was shut down. The workers finally won their demanded wage increases after a month-long strike in 1919, although their union leaders were deported not long after. After a walkout by tram workers in 1921, the CORP called an indefinite general strike in solidarity. The strike was initially supported by the FOP, leading to renewed hopes that it would unite with the CORP, but conflict between the two unions soon resumed. The Paraguayan labor movement would remain fragmented throughout the rest of the early 20th century.

== Decline and dissolution ==
Paraguayan trade unions largely supported the government of Eusebio Ayala during the Paraguayan Civil War of 1922, as well as that of his successor Eligio Ayala. Under the Ayala administrations, trade unions were able to operate more or less freely. By 1925, the increased growth of the Paraguayan export market was stimulating the growth of trade unionism, but the CORP itself began to face difficulties. Under the influence of an intellectual cadre, the CORP reorganized itself in 1927. But by this time, it was already losing influence to the socialist-led Workers' Union of Paraguay (UOP).

In May 1929, two delegates from the CORP attended the first continental congress of anarcho-syndicalists, organized by the FORA in Buenos Aires. There, the gathered Latin American union federations established the American Continental Workers' Association (ACAT), which declared its aim to be the abolition of the state and the establishment of a free association of producers.

As tensions between Paraguay and Bolivia rose, the CORP and UOP participated in a peace conference in Montevideo in 1928, organized by the Communist International, which attempted to avert the outbreak of war. Following the outbreak of the Chaco War in 1932, trade union activity was suspended in Paraguay. By the time the trade unions resumed activity, the anarcho-syndicalists had already lost their influence over the movement. By 1934, the CORP had dissolved. Anarchists such as Obdulio Barthe joined the ranks of the Paraguayan Communist Party (PCP), which took over the trade union movement.

== See also ==
- Anarchism in Paraguay

== Bibliography ==
- Alexander, Robert J. (2005). "The Paraguayan Organized Workers before Stroessner". A History of Organized Labor in Uruguay and Paraguay. Parker, Eldon M. Praeger Publishers. pp. 89–120. ISBN 978-0-275-97745-0.
- Alexander, Robert J. (2009). "Anarchosyndicalist Unions and ACAT". International Labor Organizations and Organized Labor in Latin America and the Caribbean. Parker, Eldon M. ABC-CLIO. pp. 1–10. ISBN 978-0-275-97739-9.
- Bozzolasco, Ignacio González; Rojas, Raquel (2023). "The Paraguayan Labor Movement at the Beginning of the Twenty-First Century". In Levy, Charmain; Elgert, Laureen; L'Heureux, Valérie (eds.). Social Movements and the Struggles for Rights, Justice and Democracy in Paraguay. Palgrave Macmillan. doi:10.1007/978-3-031-25883-1_6. ISBN 978-3-031-25883-1.
- Nickson, Andrew (1989). "Paraguay". In Carrière, Jean; Haworth, Nigel; Roddick, Jacqueline (eds.). The State, Industrial Relations and the Labour Movement in Latin America. Vol. 1. Palgrave Macmillan. pp. 67–98. doi:10.1007/978-1-349-05905-8_3. ISBN 978-1-349-05907-2.
- Nickson, R. Andrew (1993). "Centro Obrero Regional del Paraguay". Historical Dictionary of Paraguay. Rowman & Littlefield. pp. 108–109. ISBN 9780810879645.
