= Mensú =

Yerba mate plantation workers of Paraguay and Argentina, 1880–1950

Mensú, also known as mineros, were indentured laborers of the rural, jungle yerba mate plantations in the Alto Paraná Department of Paraguay and Argentina from 1880 to 1950. Their inhospitable work conditions were the subject of social critics Rafael Barrett and Leopoldo Ramos Giménez. The term mensú comes from mensualero, meaning "paid monthly".
