= Richard C. Miller =

- Born: Richard Crump Miller; August 6, 1912; Hanford, California, U.S.
- Died: October 15, 2010 (aged 98); Rhinebeck, New York, U.S.
- Education: Pomona College, Stanford University, University of Southern California
- Occupation: Photographer
- Known for: Photographs of celebrities including Norma Jeane, Marilyn Monroe, James Dean, Brett Weston. Photographed construction of Los Angeles freeways. Also known for his use of the carbro printing process.
- Spouse: Margaret (Dudsie) Dudley
- Children: 3
- Website: www.richardcmiller.com

Richard Crump Miller (August 6, 1912 – October 15, 2010) was an American photographer best known for his vintage carbro prints, photos of celebrities, and work documenting the Hollywood Freeway.

== Early life ==
Miller was born to Ray Oakley Miller and Laura Belle Crump Miller in Hanford, California. Miller's interest in photography developed when he was a child and toyed with his father’s 3¼x4¼ folding roll-film camera. His passion for photography led to his increase in knowledge about established photographers, and when he found out Edward Weston was moving nearby he went over to introduce himself.

=== Education ===
In 1929 Miller was introduced to Leica and Graflex, cameras and began to study cinematography while attending Stanford University and Pomona College. Miller earned his degree from the University of Southern California, where he first met his wife, Margaret Dudley.

In 1935 Miller joined a community theater, where he attempted a career as an actor. He soon found himself spending more time taking photos of fellow players than acting. While Miller was on a trip to New York City to audition for gigs, he showed his portfolio to Edward Steichen, who suggested that he stay in New York as a photographer. However, Miller decided to return to Los Angeles to marry Margaret.

== Career ==
In 1939 Miller decided to leave acting for photography. He taught himself the difficult carbro printing process (which involves lengthy layering of cyan, yellow and magenta pigments individually) and purchased a one-shot color camera which took three images simultaneously, allowing him to render portraits and moving subjects. Before long he had converted a bathroom in his parents' house into a makeshift darkroom so he could begin processing his freelance work, making him the only one at the time working in, and developing, carbro prints.

Miller's daughter, Linda, was born in 1939. He sent a photo of her to The Saturday Evening Post and in 1941 a picture of her peeking at the Thanksgiving turkey made the cover, one of only two photographic Post covers that year and the first that Miller had ever sold. This attracted offers from agents and Miller signed up with the Freelance Photographer's Guild.

In 1941, during the Second World War, Miller got a job at North American Aviation, where he met Brett Weston. Miller and Weston's pooled gas ration coupons enabled them to drive out to the Valley and photograph in their free time. When the war ended, Miller took a position as a printer where he was able to test materials and develop his own prints in Gasparcolor (later to become Cibachrome). From 1945-6 he worked as an assistant to photographers Valentino Sarra, Ruzzie Green, and John Engstead on commercial jobs. These positions allowed him to shoot for Family Circle, Parents, American Weekly, Colliers, Life, and Time. In March and April 1946, he photographed Marilyn Monroe, at the time working as a model and still using the name Norma Jeane Dougherty. He sold a cover of her, dressed as a bride and holding his wife's prayer book, to True Romance. He met her again when he was the still photographer on the set of Some Like It Hot.

While the Hollywood Freeway was being built from 1948–1953, Miller became entranced by it and started driving around Los Angeles taking photos to make a record of the construction. After a stint as a television lighting director, he returned to freelance until 1962, when he was asked to work on retainer at Globe Photos. This brought him into contact with a number of celebrities, including James Dean. The images he collected while on the set of the film Giant were on display at the Celebrity Vault in Beverly Hills, CA in 2007.

A collection of Miller's photography was exhibited alongside Paul Outerbridge at the J. Paul Getty Museum in spring 2009. Miller's first solo gallery show was held on February 27, 2010 at the Craig Krull Gallery in Bergamot Station.
