= Rafael Barrett =

Spanish writer (1876–1910)

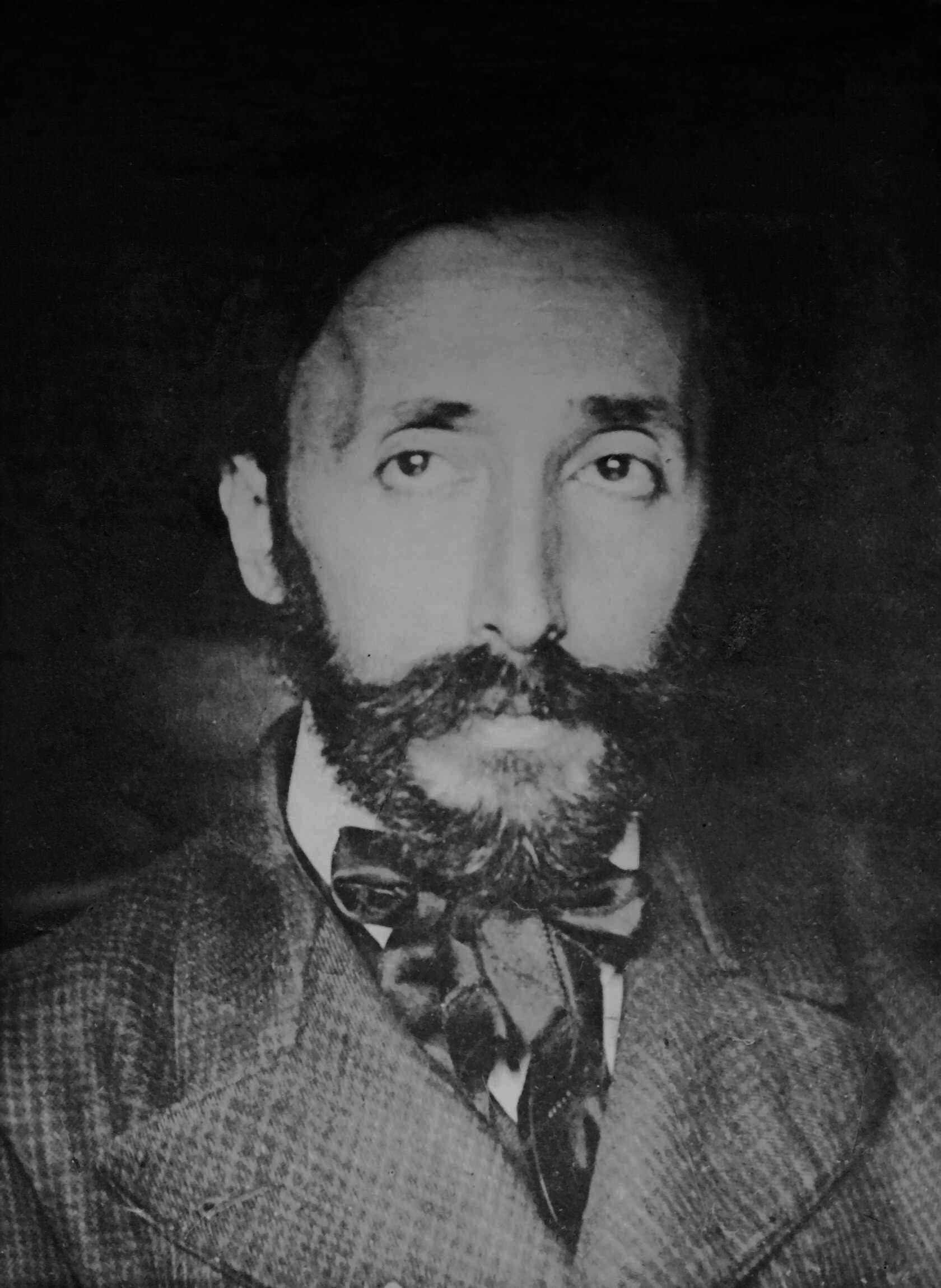
- Born: 7 January 1876; Torrelavega, Santander, Spain
- Died: 17 December 1910 (aged 34); Arcachon, Gironde, France
- Citizenship: Spanish
- Known for: Journalist, writer
- Notable work: El postulado de Euclídes (The Postulate of Euclides); Las voces del Ticino (The Voices of the Ticino)

Rafael Ángel Jorge Julián Barrett y Álvarez de Toledo (7 January 1876 – 17 December 1910) was a Spanish journalist and writer, and a major figure in 20th century Paraguayan literature.

== Biography ==
Rafael Barrett was born on 7 January 1876, in the Cantabrian city of Torrelavega; he was the son of the Englishman George Barrett and Carmen Alvarez de Toledo, whose family had distant links to the Spanish nobility. In his early life, Barrett studied languages and learned how to play the piano. He began a degree in engineering at university in Madrid, which he did not complete. When he was 26 years old, he moved to Latin America, where he sought to engage with causes for social justice.

In 1903, Barrett settled in the Buenos Aires, Argentina, where he worked as a journalist. For El Diario Español, he wrote of the extreme class stratification he witnessed in the Argentine capital, declaring: "At that moment I understood the greatness of the anarchist’s cause, and came to admire the magnificent joy with which dynamite thunders and cracks the vile human anthill." His writings were quickly circulated by the Argentine Regional Workers' Federation (FORA). He was dismissed by the paper's editor soon after. During this period, he also joined the local mathematicians' union. On 6 October 1903, he sent a number of his formulas to the French mathematician Henri Poincaré.

The following year, he moved to Paraguay, where he worked as a correspondent for El Tiempo. He arrived in time to witness the Liberal Revolution of 1904, which saw the rise of the Liberal Party to power. Barrett befriended the liberal leader Benigno Ferreira, who appointed him as director of the country's engineering department and secretary of the national railway agency. But when he witnessed pervasive political corruption and the widespread exploitation of labour under the liberal government, he resigned from all his posts. In 1906, Barrett married Francisca López Maíz, a relative of the former Paraguayan dictator Francisco Solano López.

Barrett soon became a thought leader in the Paraguayan Regional Workers' Federation (FORP). He was the keynote speaker at the FORP's first conference, where he addressed the issue of land reform. On 2 August 1908, Barrett founded the journal El Germinal, which became the main publication of the Paraguayan anarchist movement. By this time, a political crisis within the ruling Liberal Party had culminated in a coup d'état by Emiliano González Navero, whose administration initiated a crackdown against the labor movement. Several trade union activists were deported during this period, including Barrett himself.

Under the order of the liberal military leader Albino Jara, on 11 October 1908, Barrett was expelled from Paraguay to Brazil. He then headed onto Montevideo, in Uruguay, where he arrived on 5 November 1908. There he wrote for the newspapers El Siglo and La Razón, as well as the Argentine magazine Caras y Caretas. His work was well received by contemporary Uruguayan intellectuals, including Ángel Falco, Emilio Frugoni, José Enrique Rodó and Carlos Vaz Ferreira. Even in exile, he continued to publish critiques of the Paraguayan yerba maté companies and Liberal Party. He also became involved in the Uruguayan Regional Workers' Federation (FORU), which had been founded in 1905.

By 1909, Barrett's health was declining due to tuberculosis, which was worsened by the humid Uruguayan climate. Early that year, he left for the Argentine city of Corrientes and then briefly returned to Paraguay. As his health continued to deteriorate, in September 1910, he returned to Europe to seek treatment. On 17 December 1910, Barrett died in the Gascon city of Arcachon.

== Political philosophy ==
Barrett was drawn towards anarchism during his time in Buenos Aires, where he began advocating for direct action against social injustice. He had a non-doctrinaire conception of socialism and avoided participating in political sectarianism, instead calling for cooperation between anarchists and Marxists against capitalism. He opposed determinism and upheld free will, inspired by the vitalism of Henri Bergson and the idealism of Pío Baroja. Although he had a critical and ironic approach in his writing, Barrett believed in the imminence of a social revolution. Barrett also advocated for indigenous rights in South American countries.

== Legacy ==
Barrett left a large legacy on the history of Paraguayan literature, with Paraguayan writer Augusto Roa Bastos described Barrett as the "discoverer of Paraguayan social reality", while Vaz Ferreira described him as "one of our most sympathetic and noble literary figures". During the 1930s, his complete works were published by the Argentine anarchist publication La Protesta. A second edition was published in 1959 by Editorial América. A more comprehensive edition of Barrett's complete works, which included a number of his unpublished articles, was published by R. P. Ediciones in 1990.

== Bibliography ==
- Alexander, Robert J. (2005). "The Paraguayan Organized Workers before Stroessner". A History of Organized Labor in Uruguay and Paraguay. Parker, Eldon M. Praeger Publishers. pp. 89–120. ISBN 978-0-275-97745-0.
- Cappelletti, Ángel (2017). "Paraguay". Anarchism in Latin America. AK Press. ISBN 978-1-84935-282-6.
- Costa, William, ed. (2024). Paraguayan Sorrow: Writings of Rafael Barrett, A Radical Voice in a Dispossessed Land. Monthly Review. ISBN 9781685900793.
- de Laforcade, Geoffrey (2009). "Barrett, Rafael (1876-1910)". In Ness, Immanuel (ed.). The International Encyclopedia of Revolution and Protest. pp. 1–2. doi:10.1002/9781405198073.wbierp1666. ISBN 9781405198073.
- de Laforcade, Geoffrey (2011). "Federative Futures: Waterways, Resistance Societies, and the Subversion of Nationalism in the Early 20th-century Anarchism of the Río de la Plata Region". Estudios Interdisciplinarios de América Latina y el Caribe. 22 (2): 71–96. doi:10.61490/eial.v22i2.286. ISSN 0792-7061.
- Johnson, Adriana (2018). "Paraguayan Counterlives". In Pous, F.; Quin, A.; Viera, M. (eds.). Authoritarianism, Cultural History, and Political Resistance in Latin America. Memory Politics and Transitional Justice. Palgrave Macmillan. pp. 223–245. doi:10.1007/978-3-319-53544-9_12. ISBN 978-3-319-53544-9.
- Nickson, R. Andrew (1993). "Barrett, Rafael (1876-1910)". Historical Dictionary of Paraguay. Rowman & Littlefield. p. 64. ISBN 9780810879645.
- Vara, Ana María (2016). "When a Rebel Finds a Cause, a Discourse, and a Homeland: Rafael Barrett and Latin America". In Melville, Gert; Ruta, Carlos (eds.). Potency of the Common: Intercultural Perspectives about Community and Individuality. De Gruyter Oldenbourg. pp. 411–428. doi:10.1515/9783110459791-024. ISBN 9783110459791.
- Viera, Marcelino (2018). "Rafael Barrett's Haunted Letter". In Pous, F.; Quin, A.; Viera, M. (eds.). Authoritarianism, Cultural History, and Political Resistance in Latin America. Memory Politics and Transitional Justice. Palgrave Macmillan. pp. 269–293. doi:10.1007/978-3-319-53544-9_14. ISBN 978-3-319-53544-9.
