= Paraguayan Regional Workers' Federation =

Paraguayan trade union federation (1906–1916)

- Federación Obrera Regional Paraguaya
- Abbreviation: FORP
- Successor: Regional Workers' Center of Paraguay
- Established: 22 April 1906; 120 years ago
- Dissolved: 6 August 1916; 110 years ago
- Type: National trade union center
- Headquarters: Asunción
- Location: Paraguay
- General Secretary: José Serrano (1906–1913); José Cazzulo (1913–1915)
- Key people: Rafael Barrett
- Publication: El Despertar

The Paraguayan Regional Workers' Federation (Spanish: Federación Obrera Regional Paraguaya, FORP) was a Paraguayan trade union center. Established by anarcho-syndicalists in 1906, for a time, the FORP was the only trade union center in the country, organizing a series of strike actions in various different trades. During the Paraguayan Civil War of 1911–1912, the FORP was subjected to political repression and went into a decline, with some unions in the labor movement moving away from anarcho-syndicalism towards reformism. In 1916, the FORP was reorganized into the Regional Workers' Center of Paraguay (CORP), which continued to uphold its anarcho-syndicalist platform.

== Background ==
After the Paraguayan defeat in the War of the Triple Alliance, which had caused a severe labor shortage in the country, the government of the Colorado Party maintained labor laws which had bound workers to their jobs through a system of debt slavery. By the 1880s, Paraguayan workers began organizing themselves into benefit societies, the first workers' organizations in the country, which organized mutual aid and encouraged political participation. In May 1886, a typographers' society was reorganized into a trade union, the first in the country's history. It was followed soon after by unions of construction workers, carpenters, tailors, postal workers and bakers, the latter of whom carried out the country's first strike action in October 1886.

Between 1889 and 1904, 15 strike actions took place in Asunción, where workers demanded the eight-hour day, wage increases and other improvements to working conditions. During this period, the Panic of 1890 caused a severe recession, provoking widespread discontent that led to the establishment of the first anarchist groups in Paraguay. By the early 1900s, Italian anarchists had established contact with Paraguayan trade unions. Attempts were also made throughout the 1890s and early 1900s to establish a national trade union center, some with the support of the Liberal Party, although these were all short-lived. Most trade unionists considered these initiatives to be too reformist at a time when anarchist ideas were gaining more support. The radical carpenters' union, led by the Spanish anarchists José Serrano and Joan Rovira, was the first union to achieve the eight-hour day following a week-long strike in 1901.

Widespread disillusionment with the Colorado Party government escalated, with dockworkers' and tram drivers' strikes in Asunción triggering a political crisis that culminated in the Liberal Revolution of 1904. The revolution was initially supported by the Paraguayan labor movement, which in turn received sympathy from the administrations of Juan Bautista Gaona and Cecilio Báez. The introduction of laissez-faire economics by the new liberal government attracted investment from Argentine railway companies and caused a boom in the logging industry. This led to the expansion in the size of the Paraguayan working class and shifted the leadership of the trade union movement from artisans in the capital to industrial workers employed by Argentine companies. As the economy industrialized, strike actions became increasingly frequent, as workers demanded wage increases and reforms such as the abolition of child labor. Over the first three years of liberal governance in Paraguay, roughly nineteen industrial disputes took place.

== Establishment ==
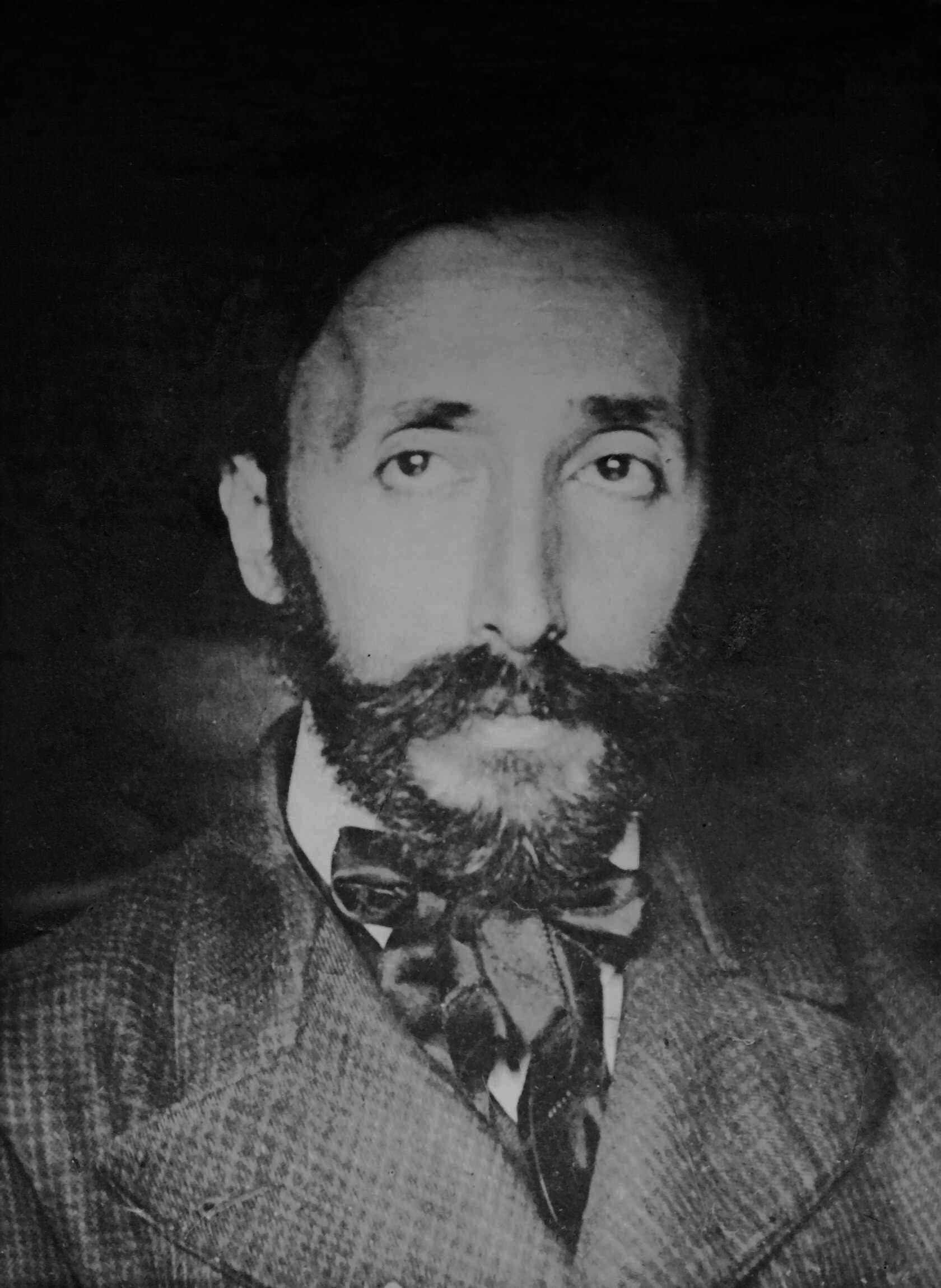
Rafael Barrett, an early supporter and thought leader of the FORP

On 9 October 1905, the anarchist carpenters' union went on strike after their employers reneged on their 1901 agreement that had established an eight-hour working day. By 22 October, the strike had achieved victory, with the workers securing the eight-hour day and a 20% wage increase. Energized by the strike's success, the carpenters reached out to other unions to establish a national trade union center. On 22 April 1906, three of Asunción's trade unions, representing carpenters, drivers and graphic designers, joined, establishing the first national trade union center in the country: the Paraguayan Regional Workers' Federation (Spanish: Federación Obrera Regional Paraguaya; FORP). Its founding members included M. Amarilla, L. Castellani, José Cazzulo, G. Recalde and José Serrano, and its establishment was supported by the anarchist theorists Rafael Barrett and Pietro Gori.

The FORP, established according to the tenets of anarcho-syndicalism, was a decentralized and federalist organization, in which its member sections had complete autonomy. Drawing from the programme of the Argentine Regional Workers' Federation (FORA), the FORP aligned itself against political parties and declared as its goal the establishment of a free association of producers.

== Activities ==
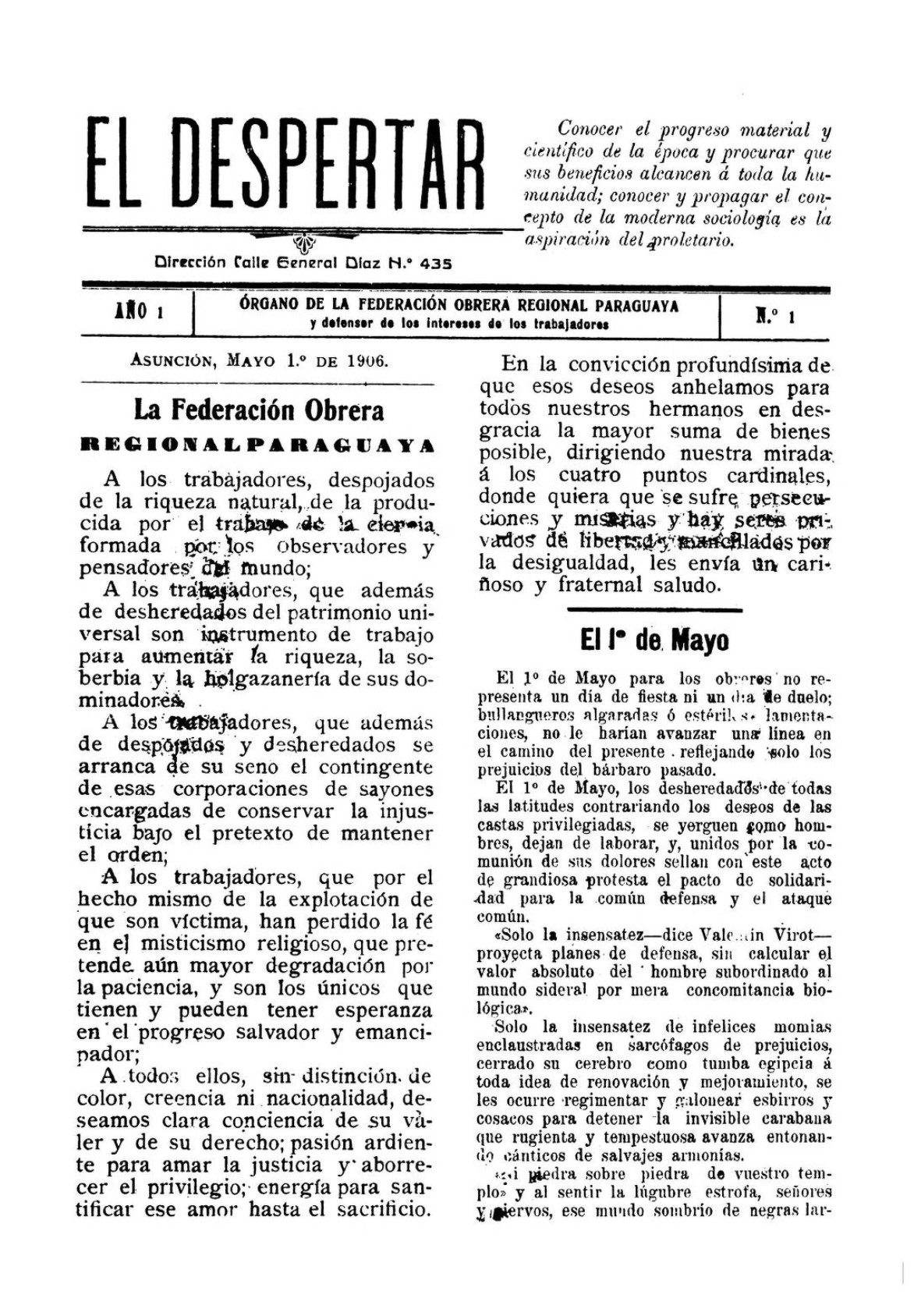
First issue of El Despertar (1 May 1906)

Soon after its founding, on 1 May 1906, the FORP held the country's first International Workers' Day demonstration, which went ahead despite police attempts to shut it down. That same day, the FORP also began publishing its official organ El Despertar, which was under the editorial control of the anarchist carpenters' union. The paper was a monthly periodical that published 11 issues during its print run. It carried articles about the anarchist movements in Europe and Latin America and printed works by authors such as Peter Kropotkin and Anselmo Lorenzo; it also published reports of the FORP's activities, named and shamed known strikebreakers and encouraged its members to pay their union dues promptly.

Two weeks after the International Workers' Day demonstration, on Paraguayan independence day, another workers' demonstration was held outside the Palace of the Government. President Cecilio Báez gave a speech to the gathered workers, encouraging class collaboration between workers and capitalists, downplaying class conflict and denouncing anarchism. Despite attempts by the government to promote reformism, the FORP remained independent of any political party and continued to be a staunchly anarchist organization.

In the wake of the Panic of 1907, the FORP organized a series of strike actions by trolley-car drivers, printers and railroad workers, the latter of whom received significant support from the press and succeeded in securing a wage increase. The following year, the Spanish anarcho-syndicalist Rafael Barrett began publishing the journal El Germinal and spoke at the FORP's First Conference of Paraguayan Workers. Barrett, who coordinated between the various anarcho-syndicalist organizations of South America and advocated for the rights of Native Paraguayans, soon became the FORP's thought leader.

== Decline and reformation ==
In July 1908, infighting within the Liberal Party culminated in a coup by Emiliano González Navero, initiating a period of economic recession and political instability. Although the labor movement in Asunción was demobilized by the affair, trade unions outside the capital began to flourish, with tannin workers in the Chaco region carrying out a successful strike for wage increases. The successive presidencies of Manuel Gondra, Albino Jara and Liberato Marcial Rojas grew increasingly hostile towards the labor movement, meeting strike actions with violent repression, dismissals, arrests and even deportation. Rafael Barrett was himself deported during this period, although he continued to publish critiques of the Paraguayan yerba maté companies and Liberal Party after his return to Spain. The repression resulted in the growth of a new tendency within the FORP, which argued for participation in the political process.

During the Paraguayan Civil War of 1911–1912, unions were prevented from carrying out any action, and the FORP effectively dissolved. After the war, the FORP resumed its activities, but by this time, a split had developed within the labor movement. Many workers began moving away from anarcho-syndicalism and some came under the influence of the Colorado Party, despite the FORP's polemics against it. By 1913, reformists had broken away from the FORP and established the Unión Gremial del Paraguay (UGP), which brought together around a dozen unions of different trades. In October 1913, the FORP reformed itself and reaffirmed its anarcho-syndicalist ideals; as its new executive committee, it established a Federal Council, which consisted of four carpenters, two mechanics, one printer and one shoemaker, as well as a number of intellectuals. The FORP returned to organizing trade unions, now in direct competition with the UGP.

After the outbreak of World War I caused a recession in Paraguay, both the UGP and FORP declined into inactivity. But from 1916, an increased demand for Paraguayan agricultural exports led to a resurgence in the domestic labor movement, as several new trade unions were established, displacing much of the old guard. On 6 August 1916, the nine unions of the FORP reorganized themselves, establishing the Regional Workers' Center of Paraguay (Spanish: Centro Obrero Regional del Paraguay; CORP), which adopted a modified version of the FORP's anarcho-syndicalist platform.

== Bibliography ==
- Alexander, Robert J. (2005). "The Paraguayan Organized Workers before Stroessner". A History of Organized Labor in Uruguay and Paraguay. Parker, Eldon M. Westport, Connecticut: Praeger Publishers. pp. 89–120. ISBN 978-0-275-97745-0.
- Bozzolasco, Ignacio González; Rojas, Raquel (2023). "The Paraguayan Labor Movement at the Beginning of the Twenty-First Century". In Levy, Charmain; Elgert, Laureen; L'Heureux, Valérie (eds.). Social Movements and the Struggles for Rights, Justice and Democracy in Paraguay. Cham, Switzerland: Palgrave Macmillan. doi:10.1007/978-3-031-25883-1_6. ISBN 978-3-031-25883-1.
- Cappelletti, Angel (2017). "Paraguay". Anarchism in Latin America. AK Press. ISBN 978-1-84935-282-6.
- Costa, William, ed. (2024). Paraguayan Sorrow: Writings of Rafael Barrett, A Radical Voice in a Dispossessed Land. New York: Monthly Review. ISBN 978-1-68590-079-3.
- de Laforcade, Geoffrey (2011). "Federative Futures: Waterways, Resistance Societies, and the Subversion of Nationalism in the Early 20th-century Anarchism of the Río de la Plata Region". Estudios Interdisciplinarios de América Latina y el Caribe. 22 (2): 71–96. doi:10.61490/eial.v22i2.286. ISSN 0792-7061.
- Lambert, Peter; Medina, Ricardo (2007). "Contested Discourse, Contested Power: Nationalism and the Left in Paraguay". Bulletin of Latin American Research. 26 (3): 339–355. doi:10.1111/j.1470-9856.2007.00228.x.
- Nickson, Andrew (1989). "Paraguay". In Carrière, Jean; Haworth, Nigel; Roddick, Jacqueline (eds.). The State, Industrial Relations and the Labour Movement in Latin America. Vol. 1. Basingstoke: Palgrave Macmillan. pp. 67–98. doi:10.1007/978-1-349-05905-8_3. ISBN 978-1-349-05907-2.
- Nickson, R. Andrew (1993a). "Barrett, Rafael (1876-1910)". Historical Dictionary of Paraguay. Lanham, Maryland: Rowman & Littlefield. p. 64. ISBN 978-0-81087-964-5.
- Nickson, R. Andrew (1993b). "Federación Obrera Regional Paraguaya". Historical Dictionary of Paraguay. Lanham, Maryland: Rowman & Littlefield. pp. 219–220. ISBN 978-0-81087-964-5.
- Vara, Ana María (2016). "When a Rebel Finds a Cause, a Discourse, and a Homeland: Rafael Barrett and Latin America". In Melville, Gert; Ruta, Carlos (eds.). Potency of the Common: Intercultural Perspectives about Community and Individuality. Berlin: De Gruyter Oldenbourg. pp. 411–428. doi:10.1515/9783110459791-024. ISBN 978-3-11045-979-1.
