= Geography of Paraguay =

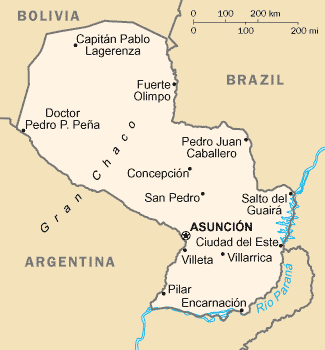
Map of Paraguay

Paraguay is a country in South America, bordering Argentina, Bolivia and Brazil. The Paraguay River (Spanish: Río Paraguay) divides the country into strikingly different eastern and western regions. Both the eastern region (officially called Eastern Paraguay, Paraguay Oriental, and known as the Paraneña region) and the western region (officially Western Paraguay, Paraguay Occidental, and known as the Chaco) gently slope toward and are drained into the Paraguay River, which separates and unifies the two regions. With the Paraneña region reaching southward and the Chaco extending to the north, Paraguay straddles the Tropic of Capricorn and experiences both subtropical and tropical climates.

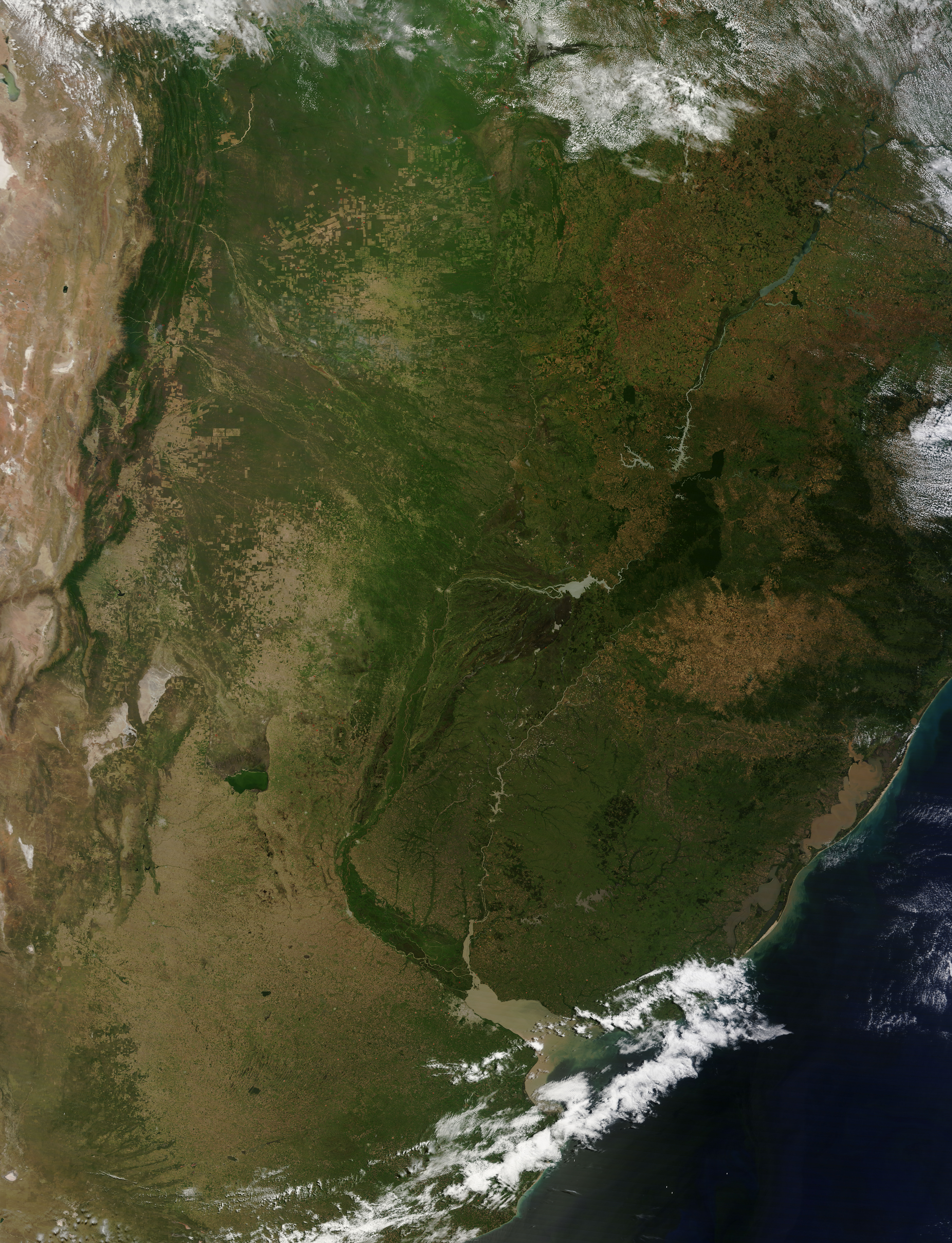
Paraguay from space

== Borders ==
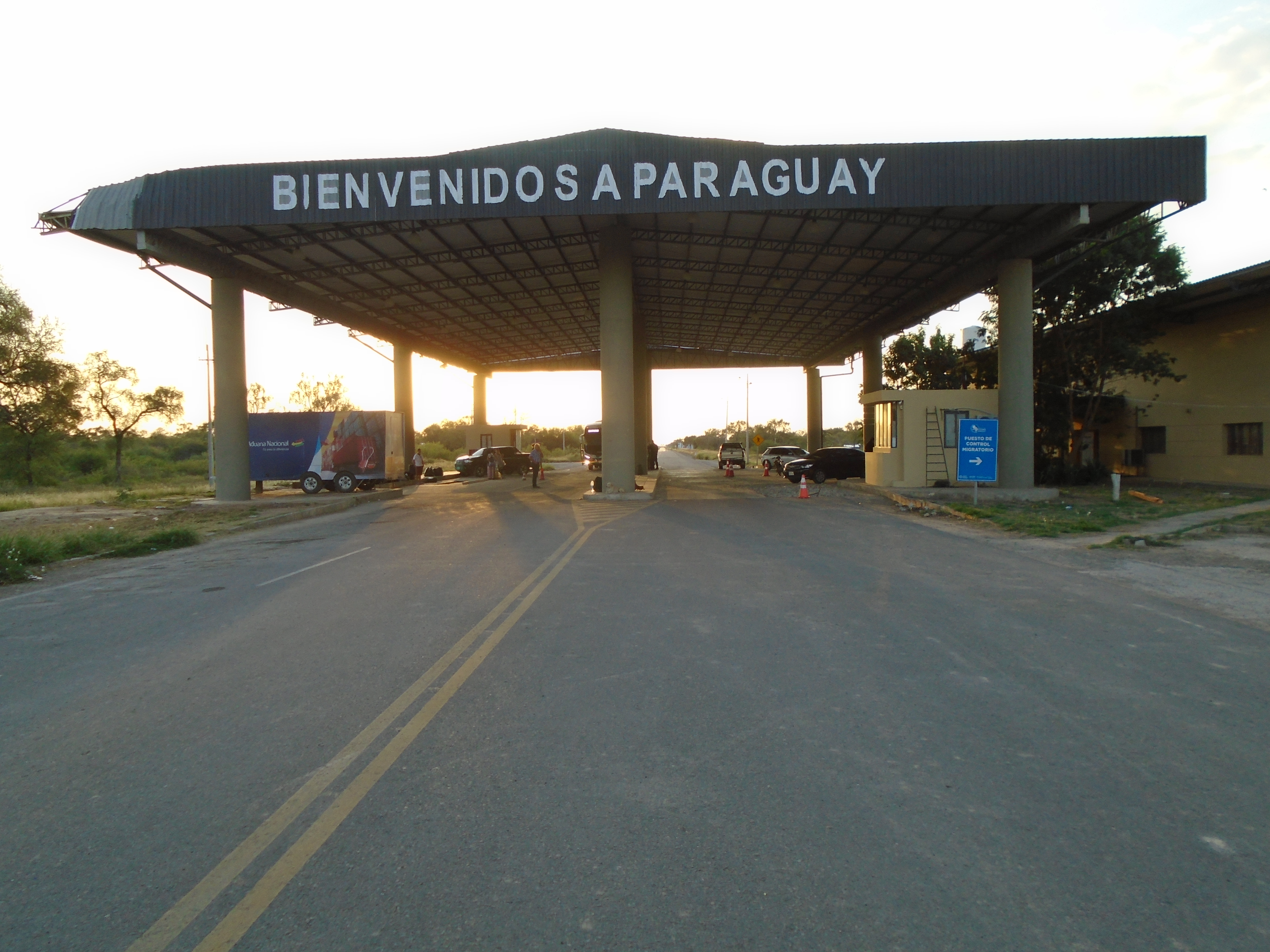
The Bolivia-Paraguay border, at the end of the Route 9 (detour to the Infante Rivarola-Ibibobo border checkpoint) as seen from the Bolivian side.

Paraguay borders on three substantially larger countries: Bolivia, Brazil, and Argentina. The country has three tripoints: Argentina-Bolivia-Paraguay, Bolivia-Brazil-Paraguay and Paraguay-Argentina-Brazil. The definition of the northwestern boundary with Bolivia, extending through the low hills of the Chaco region, dates from 1938. The boundary between the Chaco and Brazil was defined in 1927; it continues from the confluence of the Apa River (Río Apa) and Paraguay River northward along the course of the Paraguay River to the border with Bolivia. The northern border of the Paraneña region, set in 1872, follows the course of the Paraná River (Río Paraná), the ridges of the mountains in the northeast region, and finally the course of the Apa River until it empties into the Paraguay River. The large Argentina–Paraguay border comprises the Pilcomayo River (Río Pilcomayo), Paraná River, and Paraguay River. Argentina and Paraguay agreed on these boundaries in 1876.

== Natural regions ==
Eastern Paraguay (Paraneña) Western Paraguay (Chaco)

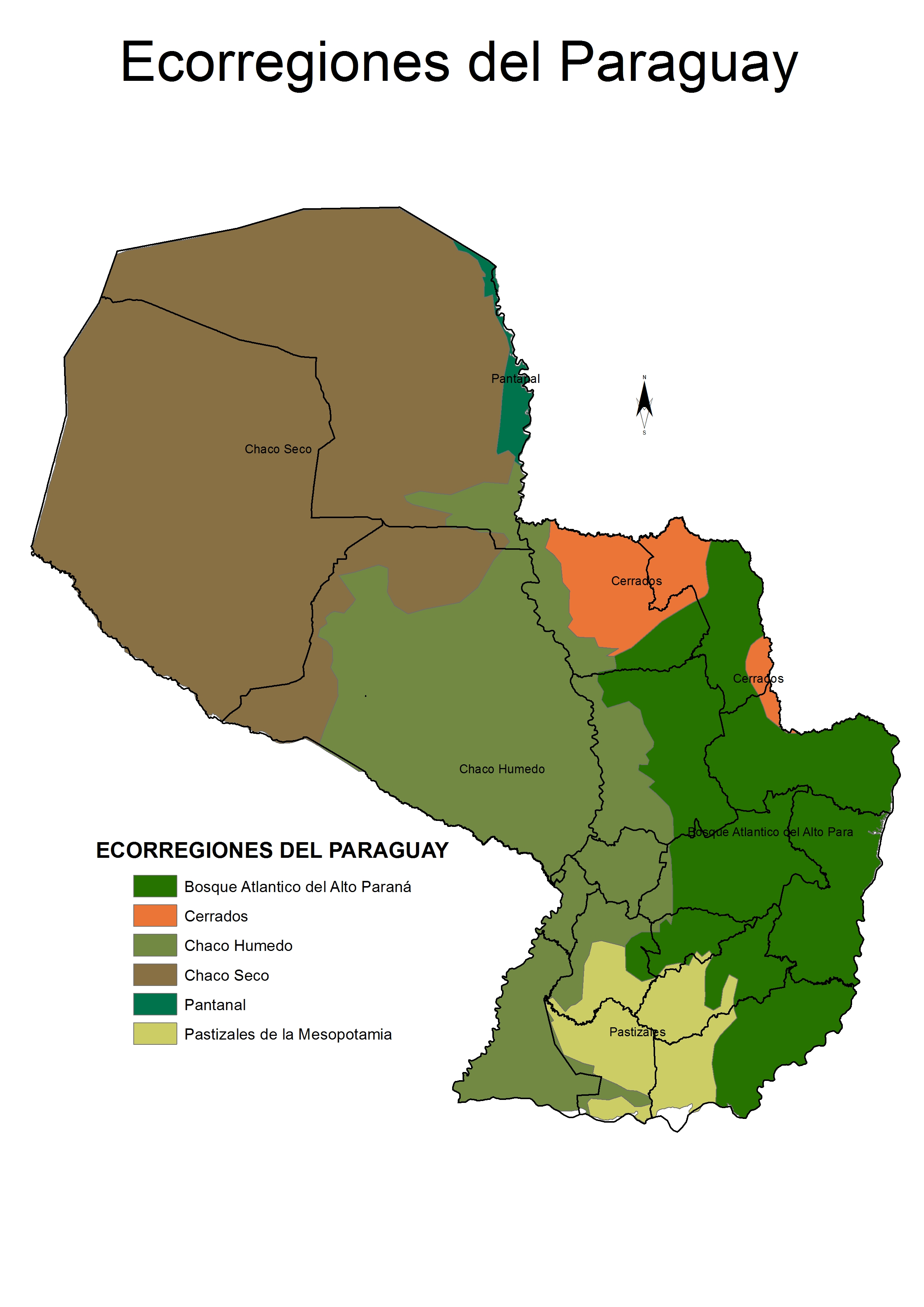
The ecoregions of Paraguay: Dry Chaco, Pantanal, Cerrado, Humid Chaco, Alto Paraná Atlantic forests Mesopotamian grasslands

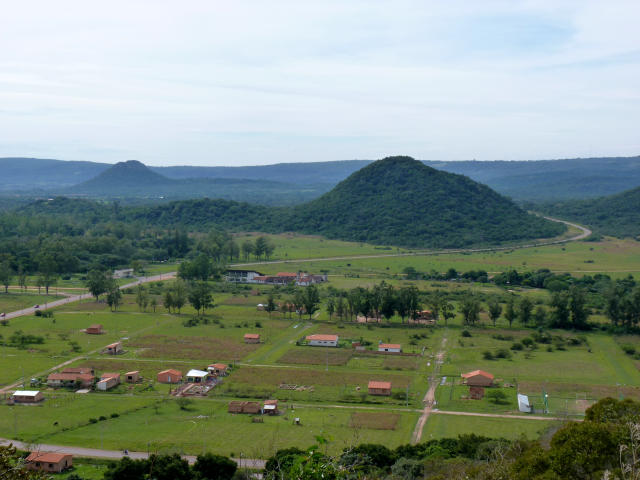
Hills around Paraguarí

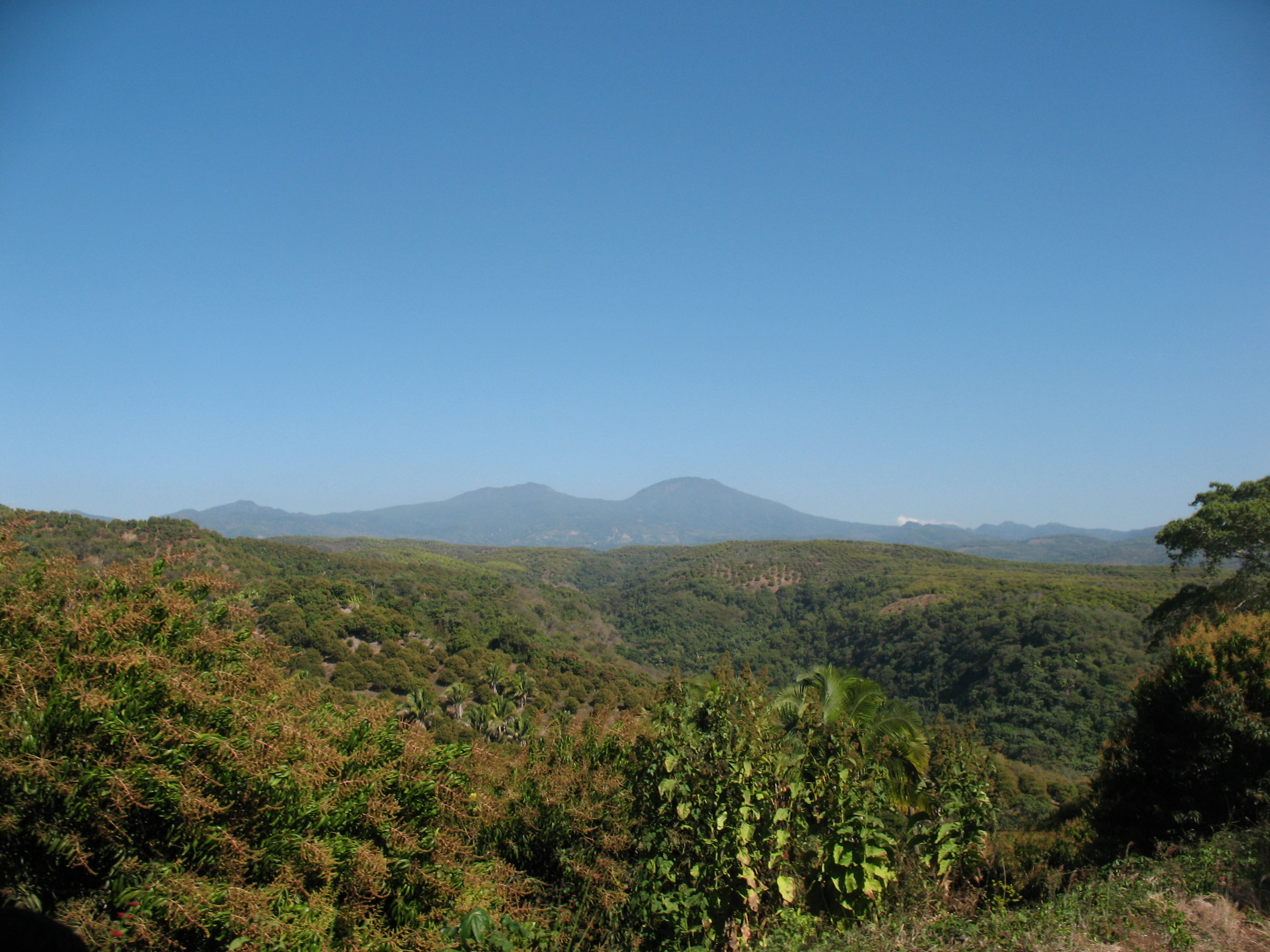
Cerro Cora National Park

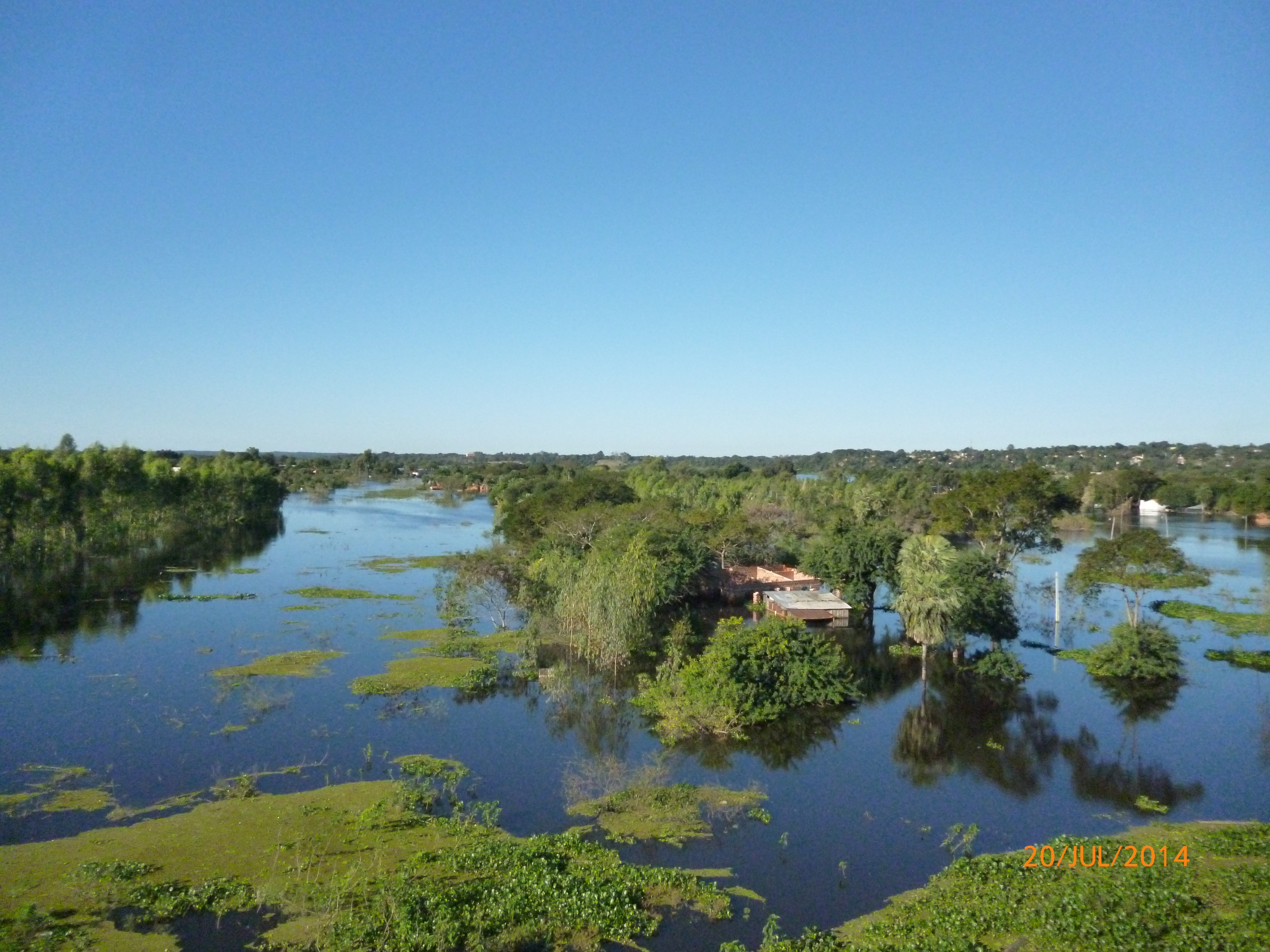
Paraguayan Pantanal seen in northern Presidente Hayes Department.

Paraguay contains six terrestrial ecoregions: Alto Paraná Atlantic forests, Chaco, Cerrado, Humid Chaco, Pantanal, and Paraná flooded savanna which fall into two main natural regions, divided by the Paraguay River: the Paraneña region (a mixture of plateaus, rolling hills, and valleys) and the Chaco region (an immense piedmont plain).

About 95 percent of Paraguay's population resides in the Paraneña region, which has all the significant orographic features and a more predictable climate. The Paraneña region can be generally described as consisting of an area of highlands in the east that slopes toward the Río Paraguay and becomes an area of lowlands, subject to floods, along the river.

The Chaco consists predominantly of lowlands, also inclined toward the Río Paraguay, that are alternately flooded and parched.

=== The Eastern Region: Paraneña ===
The Eastern region extends from the Río Paraguay eastward to the Río Paraná, which forms the border with Brazil and Argentina. The eastern hills and mountains, an extension of a plateau in southern Brazil, dominate the region. They reach to about 700 meters (2,300 ft) above sea level at their highest point. The Eastern region also has spacious plains, broad valleys, and lowlands. About 80% of the region lies below 300 meters (1,000 ft) in elevation; the lowest elevation, 60 meters (200 ft), occurs in the extreme south at the confluence of the Río Paraguay and Río Paraná.

The Eastern region is drained primarily by rivers that flow westward to the Río Paraguay, although some rivers flow eastward to the Río Paraná. Low-lying meadows, subject to floods, separate the eastern mountains from the Río Paraguay.

The Eastern region as a whole naturally divides into five physiographic subregions:

1. the Paraná Plateau
2. the Northern Upland
3. the Central Hill Belt
4. the Central Lowland
5. the Ñeembucú Plain

In the east, the heavily wooded Paraná Plateau occupies one-third of the region and extends its full length from north to south and up to 145 kilometers (90 mi) westward from the Brazilian and Argentine borders. The Paraná Plateau's western edge is defined by an escarpment that descends from an elevation of about 460 meters (1,500 ft) in the north to about 180 meters (590 ft) at the subregion's southern extremity. The plateau slopes moderately to east and south, its remarkably uniform surface interrupted only by the narrow valleys carved by the westward-flowing tributaries of the Río Paraná.

The Northern Upland, the Central Hill Belt, and the Central Lowland constitute the lower terrain lying between the escarpment and the Río Paraguay. The first of these eroded extensions stretching westward of the Paraná Plateau—the Northern Upland—occupies the portion northward from the Aquidabán River (Río Aquidabán) to the Apa River on the Brazilian border. For the most part it consists of a rolling plateau about 180 meters (590 ft) above sea level and 76 to 90 meters (249 to 295 ft) above the plain farther to the south. The Central Hill Belt encompasses the area in the vicinity of Asunción. Although nearly flat surfaces occur in this subregion, the rolling terrain is extremely uneven. Small, isolated peaks are numerous, and it is here that the only lakes of any size are found. Between these two upland subregions lies the Central Lowland, an area of low elevation and relief, sloping gently upward from the Río Paraguay toward the Paraná Plateau. The valleys of the Central Lowland's westward-flowing rivers are broad and shallow, and periodic flooding of their courses creates seasonal swamps. This subregion's most conspicuous features, its flat-topped hills, project 6–9 meters (20–30 ft) from the grassy plain. Thickly forested, these hills cover areas ranging from a hectare to several square kilometers (acres to square miles). Apparently the weathered remnants of rock related to geological formations farther to the east, these hills are called islas de monte (mountain islands), and their margins are known as costas (coasts).

The remaining subregion—the Ñeembucú Plain—lies in the southwest corner of the Paraneña region. This alluvial flatland has a slight westerly-southwesterly slope obscured by gentle undulations. The Tebicuary River (Río Tebicuary)—a major tributary of the Río Paraguay – bisects the swampy lowland, which is broken in its central portion by rounded swells of land up to three meters in height.

The main orographic features of the Paraneña region include the Cordillera de Amambay, the Cordillera de Mbaracayú, and the Cordillera de Caaguazú. The Cordillera de Amambay extends from the northeast corner of the region south and slightly east along the Brazilian border. The mountains reach on average 400 meters (1,300 ft) above sea level, although the highest point reaches 700 meters (2,300 ft). The main chain, 200 kilometers (120 mi) long, has smaller branches that extend to the west and die out along the banks of the Río Paraguay in the Northern Upland.

The Cordillera de Amambay merges with the Cordillera de Mbaracayú, which reaches eastward 120 kilometers (75 mi) to the Río Paraná. The average height of this mountain chain is 200 meters (656 ft); the highest point of the chain, 500 meters (2,000 ft), lies within Brazilian territory. The Río Paraná forms the Salto del Guairá waterfall where it cuts through the mountains of the Cordillera de Mbaracayú to enter Argentina.

The Cordillera de Caaguazú falls where the other two main mountain ranges meet and extends south, with an average height of 400 meters (1,300 ft). Its highest point, Cerro de San Joaquín, reaches 500 meters (1,600 ft) above sea level. This chain is not a continuous massif but is interrupted by hills and undulations covered with forests and meadows. The Cordillera de Caaguazú reaches westward from the Paraná Plateau into the Central Hill Belt.

A lesser mountain chain, the Serranía de Mbaracayú, also rises at the point where the Cordillera de Amambay and Cordillera de Mbaracayú meet. The Serranía de Mbaracayú extends east and then south to parallel the Río Paraná; the mountain chain has an average height of 500 meters (1,600 ft).

The eastern region has a population of 7,232,890 and an area of 159,827 km^{2}, the population density is 45.25/km^{2}.

=== The Western Region: Chaco ===
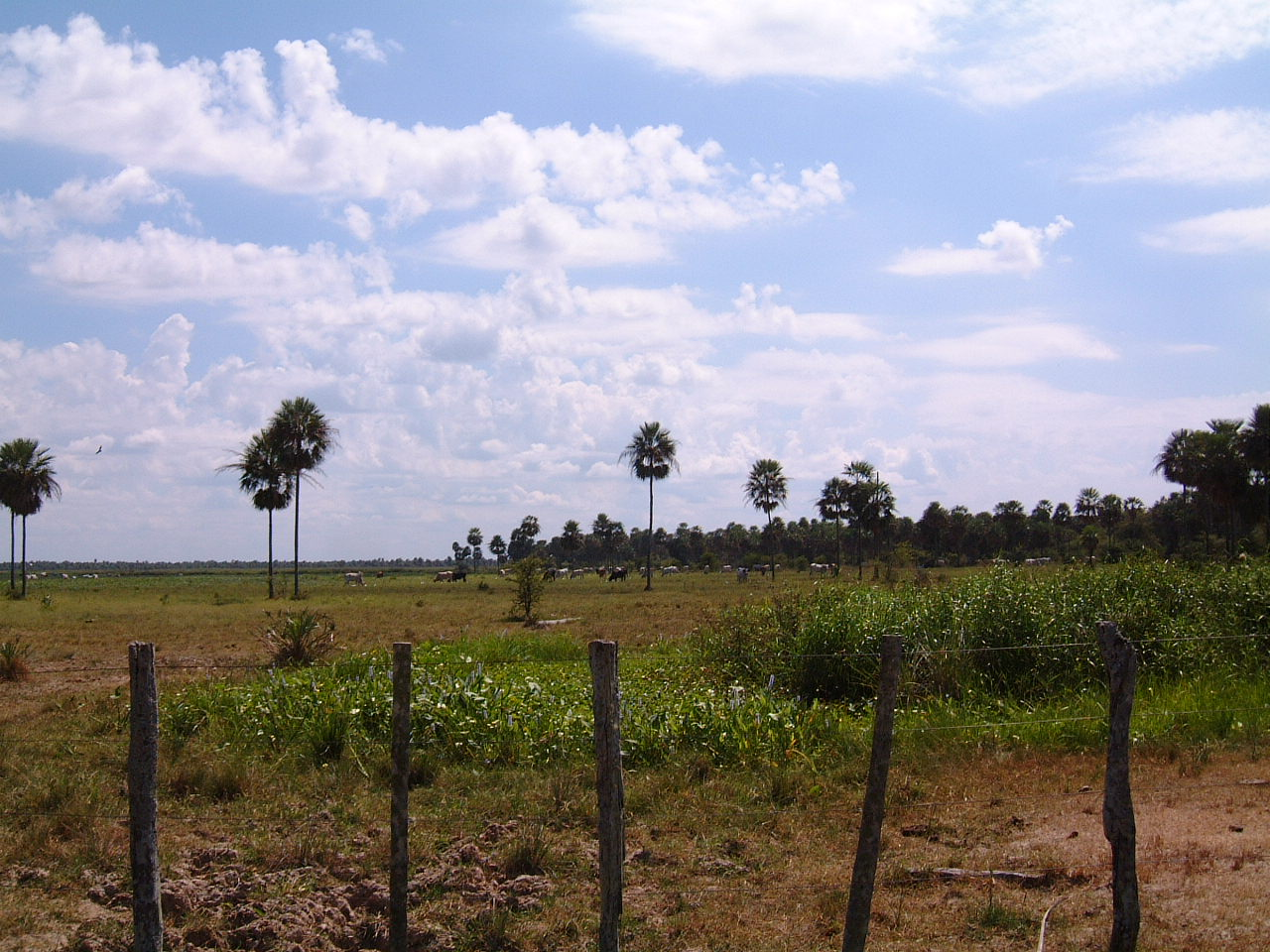
Cattle ranch, Presidente Hayes Department, Chaco

Separated from the Eastern region by the Paraguay River, the Chaco region is a vast plain with elevations reaching no higher than 300 m (980 ft) and averaging 125 m (400 ft). Covering more than 60 percent of Paraguay's total land area, the Chaco plain slopes gently eastward to the Río Paraguay.

The Paraguayan Chaco is subdivided into two parts. The Alto Chaco (Upper Chaco), also called Chaco Seco (Dry Chaco) is the western three-quarters of the region, bordering on Bolivia, while the Bajo Chaco (Lower Chaco) or Chaco Húmedo (Humid Chaco) borders on the Paraguay River. The low hills in the northwestern part of the Alto Chaco are the highest parts in the Gran Chaco. One prominent wetland of the Bajo Chaco is the Estero Patiño, which at 1,500 km^{2} (580 sq mi) forms the largest swamp in the country.

The Paraguay Chaco's western two-thirds belong to the semi-arid tropics with annual precipitations between 550 and 1,000 mm (20 and 40 in), vegetation being dry low scrub in the west to higher growth xerophytic (semi-arid impenetrable thorn) forest towards the east. The eastern third belongs to the semi-humid tropics, with rainfall between 1,000 and 1,300 mm (40 and 50 in), taller vegetation, and tropical semi-humid forest. A belt about 50 km (30 mi) in length along the Paraguay River again has a different evergreen vegetation of wetlands and palm tree forests (Bajo Chaco).

Annual evaporation is around 1,500 mm (60 in). The very pronounced dry season lasts from May to October, and a wet season occurs from November to April, when the vegetation turns green and abundant.

The soils of the Chaco are very deep sedimentary soils rich in nutrients, including luvisols, cambisols, and regosols, and are in general very fertile and apt for agriculture and pasture (always presuming responsible and sustainable techniques), more so than most of the world's semi-arid tropics. Limiting factors include a lack of ground freshwater in most of the Paraguay's Chaco, except in the north and the west. The lowlands facing the Paraguay River have insufficient drainage and seasonal flooding (which again increases soil fertility) as a constraint.

The western region has a population of 220,805 and an area of 246,925 km^{2}, the population density is 0.89/km^{2}.

== Drainage ==
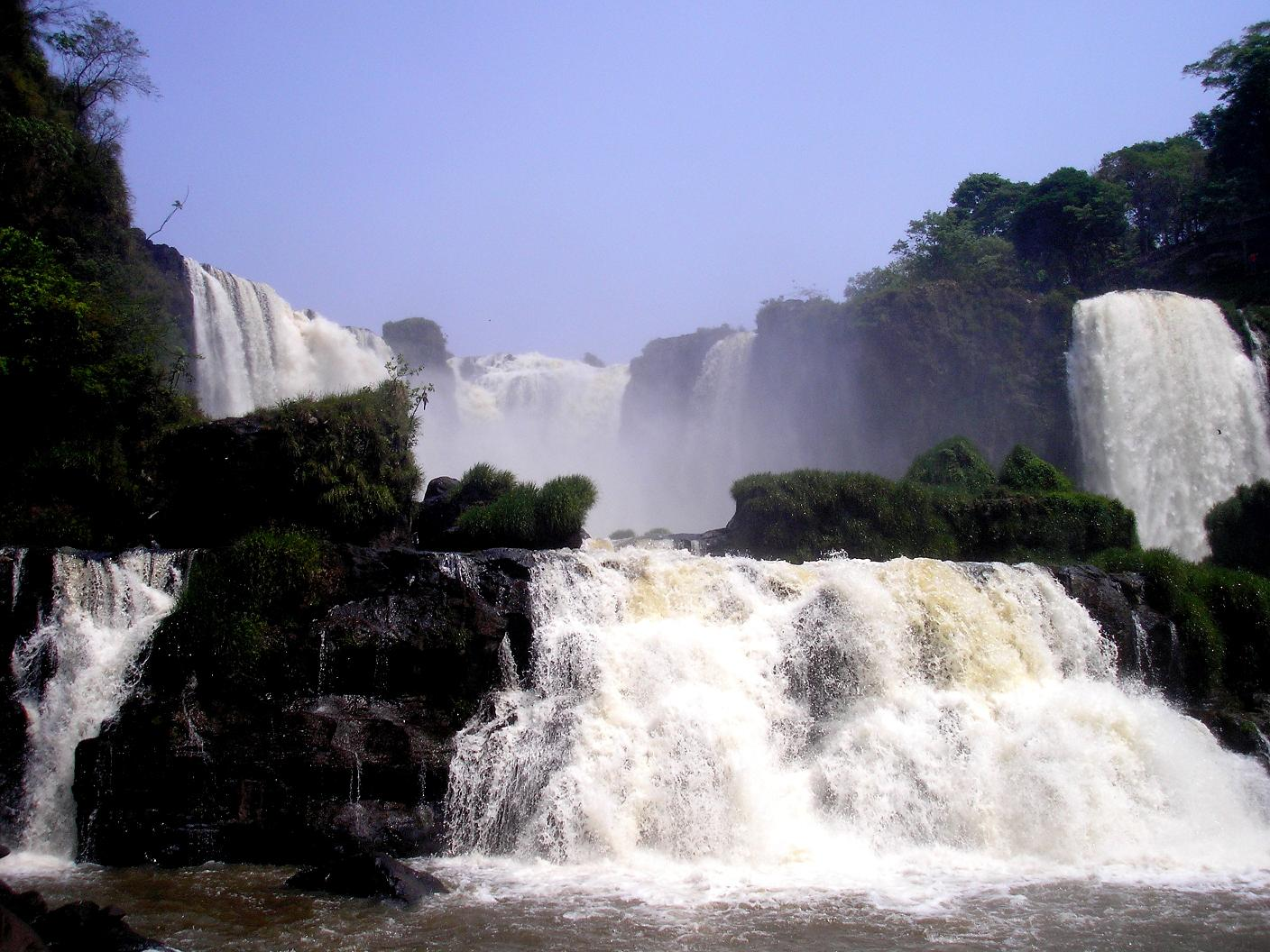
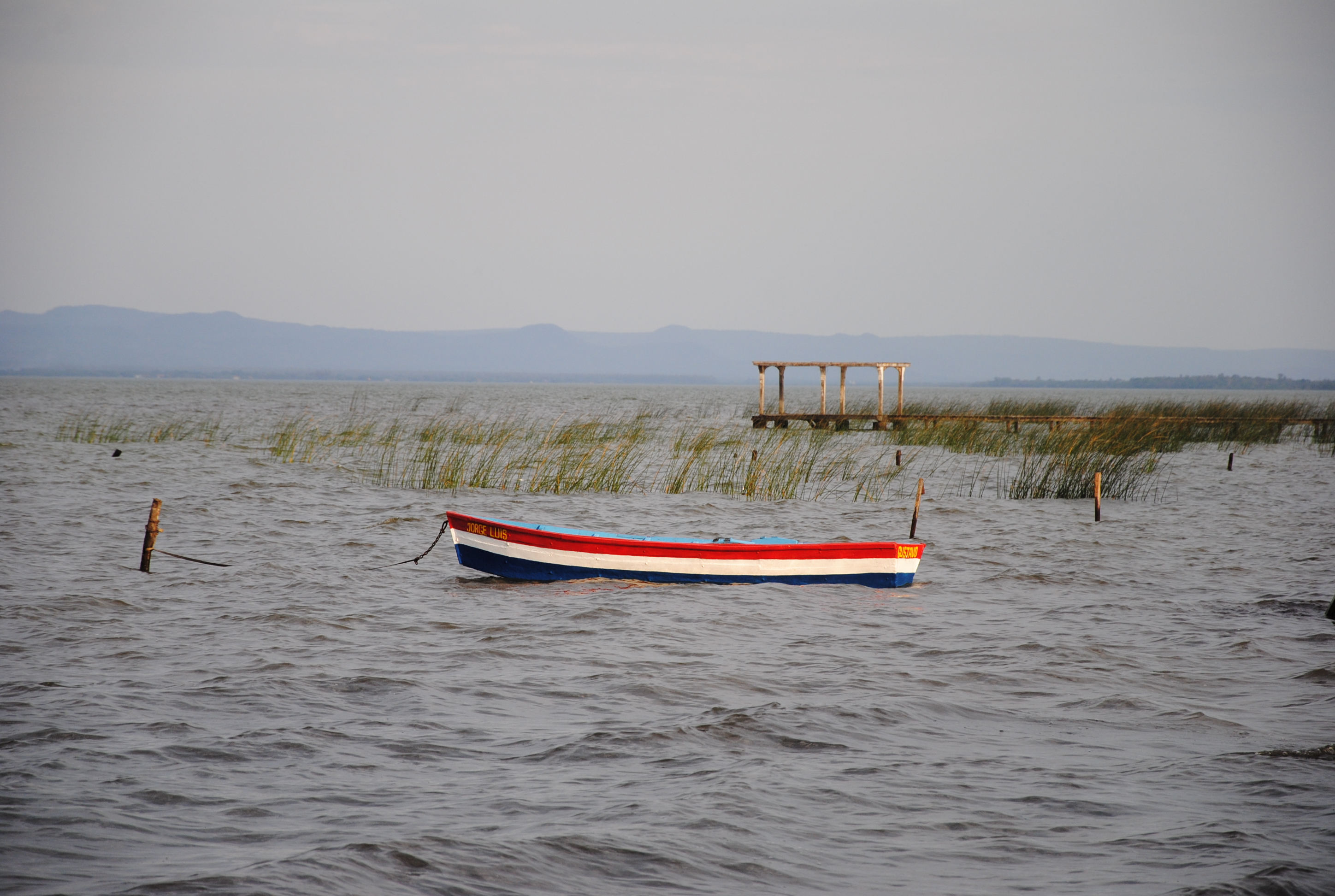
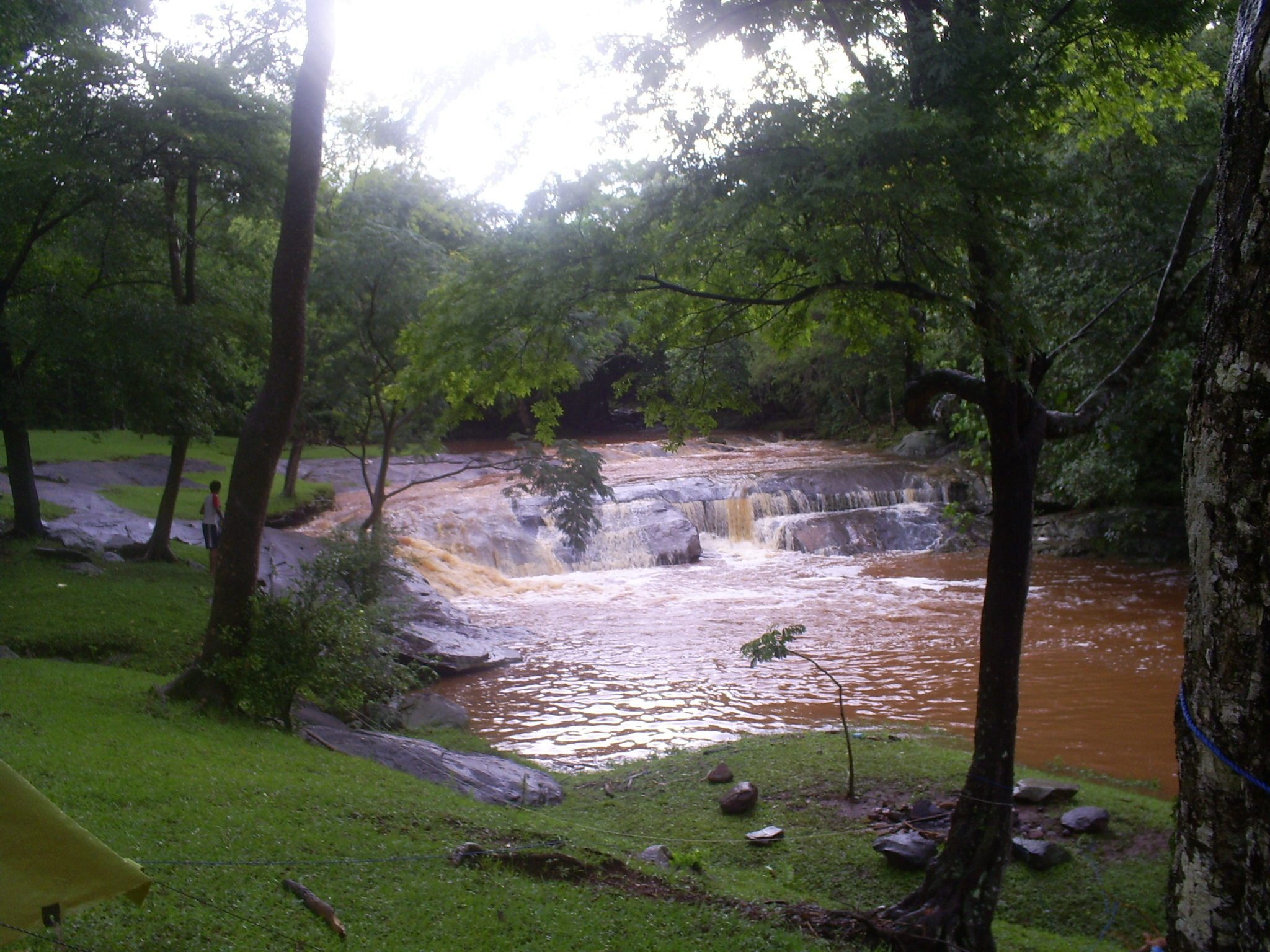
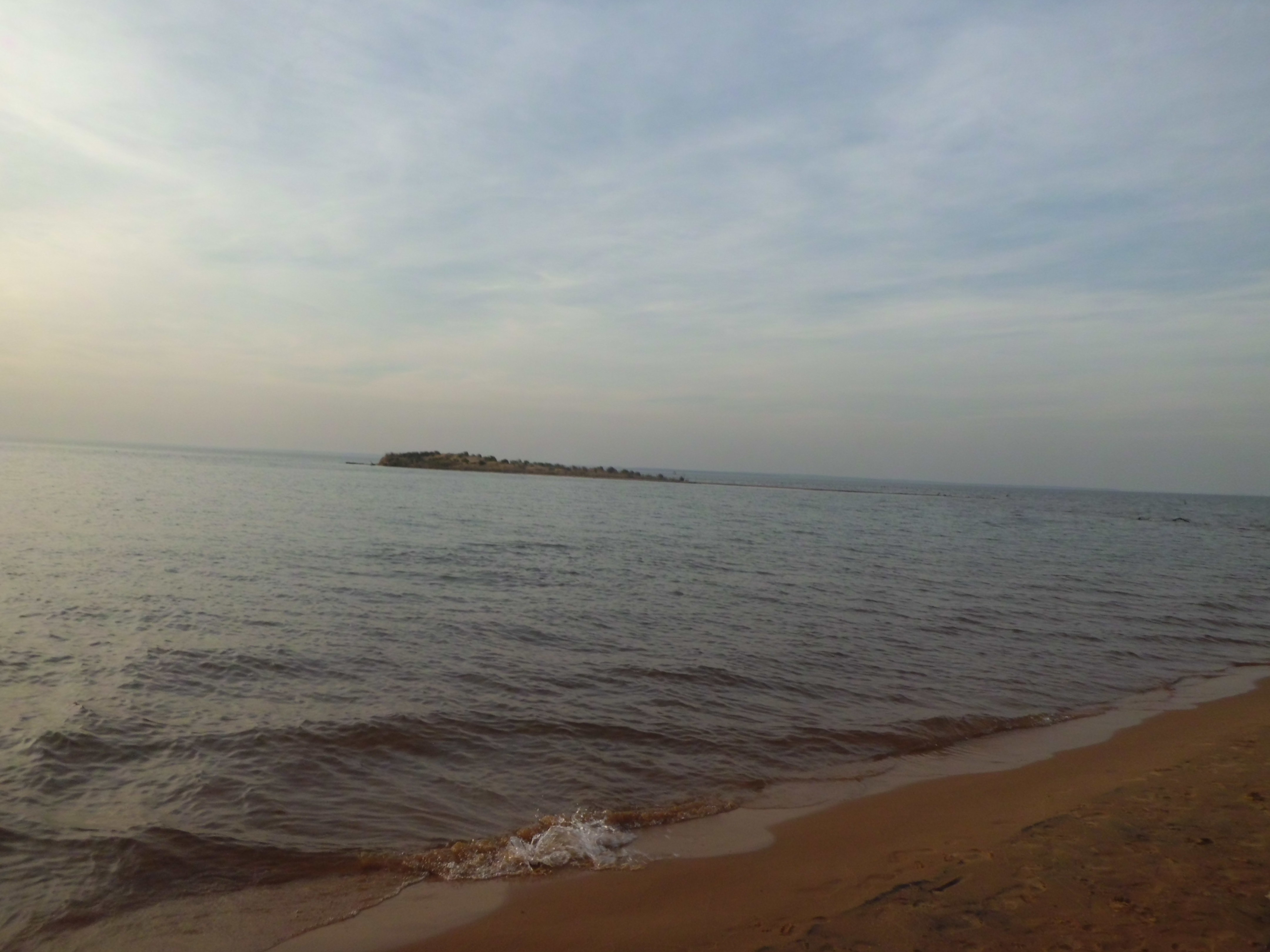
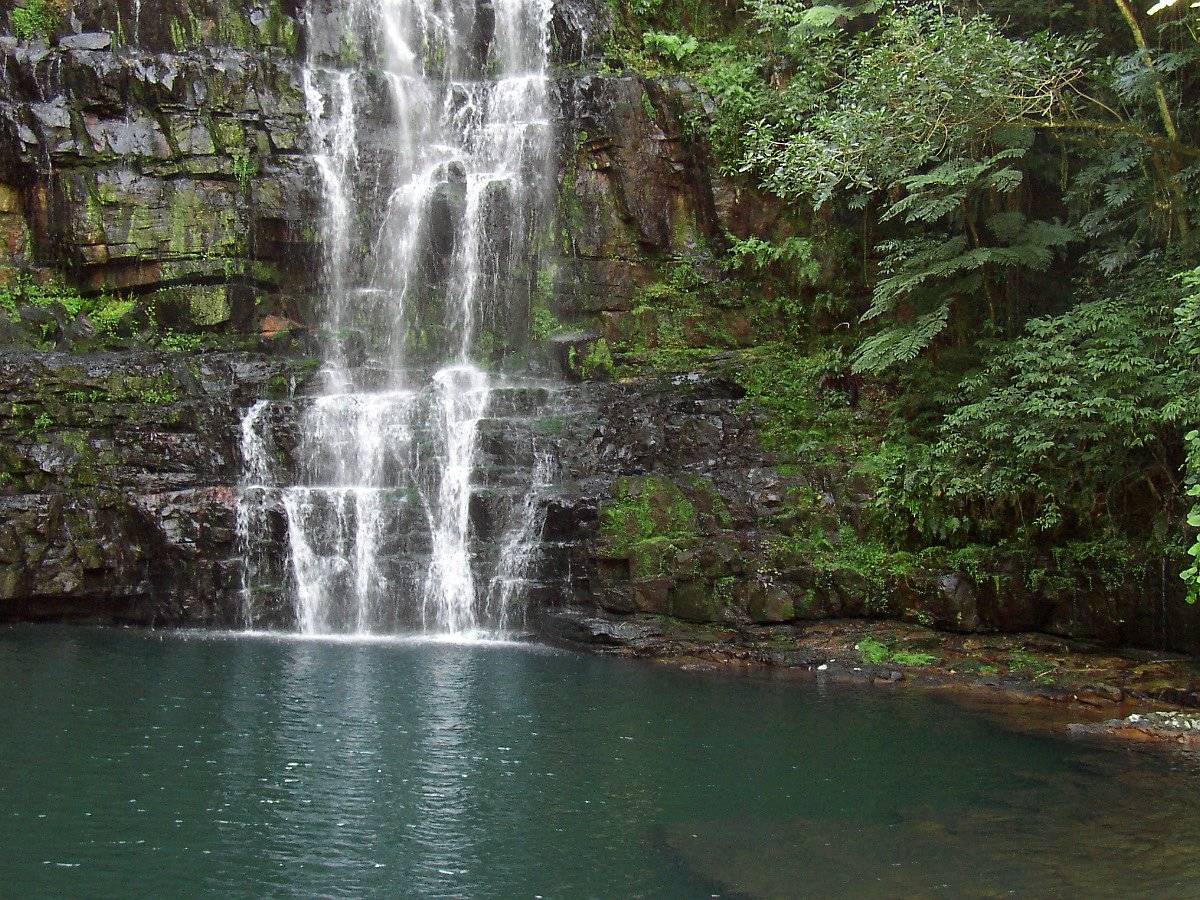
1.The Saltos del Monday, 2. A View of Ypacarai Lake, east of Asunción, 3. A common stream in Paraguay, 4. The dunes of San Cosme y Damián, Southern Paraguay, 5. Salto Cristal, Paraguarí Department, Paraguay.

The word Paraguay can be translated as the Paradise of Waters, as there is plenty to be found all around the country, including underneath it; see Guarani Aquifer. The Paraguay River has a total course of 2600 km, 2300 km of which are navigable and 1200 km of which either border on or pass through Paraguay. During most years vessels with 21 m drafts can reach Concepción without difficulty. Medium-sized ocean vessels can sometimes reach Asunción, but the twisting meanders and shifting sandbars can make this transit difficult. Although sluggish and shallow, the river sometimes overflows its low banks, forming temporary swamps and flooding villages. River islands, meander scars, and oxbow (U-shaped) lakes attest to frequent changes in course.

The major tributaries entering the Paraguay River from the Paraneña region—such as the Apa, Aquidabán, and Tebicuary Rivers—descend rapidly from their sources in the Paraná Plateau to the lower lands. There they broaden and become sluggish as they meander westward. After heavy rains these rivers sometimes flood nearby lowlands.

About 4700 km long, the Paraná River is the second major river in the country. From Salto del Guairá, where the former Guairá Falls were located, the river enters Paraguay and flows 800 km to its juncture with the Paraguay River and then continues southward to the Río de la Plata Estuary at Buenos Aires, Argentina. In general, the Río Paraná is navigable by large ships only up to Encarnación in Southern Paraguay but smaller boats may go somewhat further north. In summer months the river is deep enough to permit vessels with drafts of up to three meters to reach Salto del Guairá, but seasonal and other occasional conditions severely limit the river's navigational value. On the upper course, sudden floods may raise the water level by as much as five meters in twenty-four hours; west of Encarnación, however, the rocks of the riverbed sometimes come within one meter of the surface during winter and effectively sever communication between the upper river and Buenos Aires.

The rivers flowing eastward across the Paraneña region as tributaries of the Paraná River are shorter, faster-flowing, and narrower than the tributaries of the Paraguay River, except the Iguazu River at the Iguazu Falls. Sixteen of these rivers and numerous smaller streams enter the Paraná River above Encarnación.

Paraguay's third largest river, the Pilcomayo River, flows into the Paraguay River near Asunción after demarcating the entire border between the Chaco region and Argentina. During most of its course, the river is sluggish and marshy, although small craft can navigate its lower reaches. When the Pilcomayo River overflows its low banks, it feeds the Patiño Estuary (Estero Patiño).

Drainage in the Chaco region is generally poor because of the flatness of the land and the small number of important streams. In many parts of the region, the water table is only a meter beneath the surface of the ground, and there are numerous small ponds and seasonal marshes. As a consequence of the poor drainage, most of the water is too salty for drinking or irrigation.

Because of the seasonal overflow of the numerous westward-flowing streams, the lowland areas of the Paraneña region also experience poor drainage conditions, particularly in the Ñeembucú Plain in the southwest, where an almost impervious clay subsurface prevents the absorption of excess surface water into the aquifer. About 30 percent of the Paraneña region is flooded from time to time, creating extensive areas of seasonal marshlands. Permanent bogs are found only near the largest geographic depressions, however.

== Climate ==
Paraguay map of Köppen climate classification zones

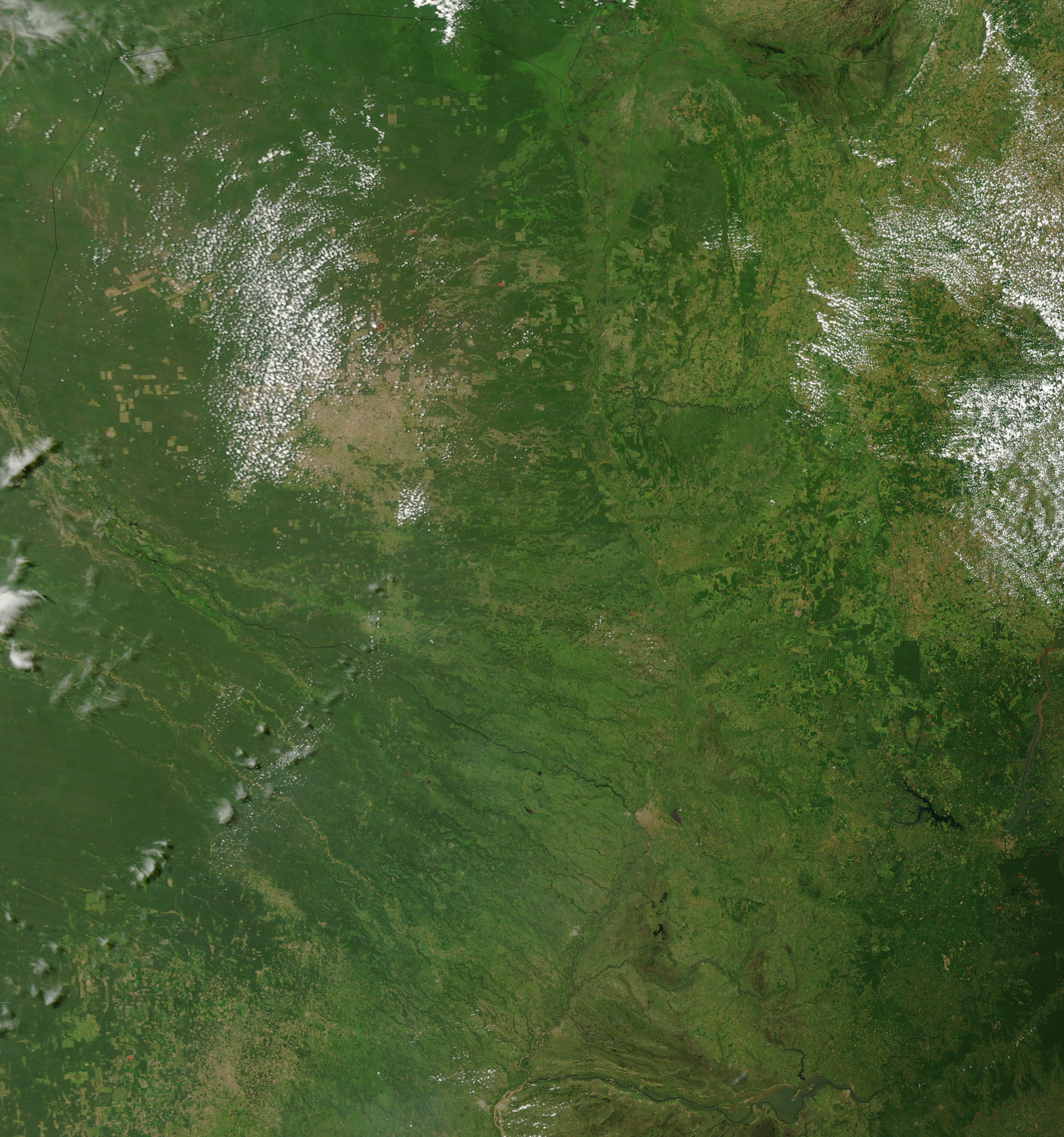
Satellite image of Paraguay in January 2003

Paraguay experiences a subtropical climate in the Paraneña region, and tropical and semi-arid climates in the Chaco. The Paraneña region has a humid climate, with abundant precipitation throughout the year. During the Southern Hemisphere's summer, which corresponds to the northern winter, the dominant influence on the climate is the warm sirocco winds blowing out of the northeast. During the winter, the dominant wind is the cold pampero from the South Atlantic, which blows across Argentina and is deflected northeastward by the Andes in the southern part of that country. Because of the lack of topographic barriers within Paraguay, these opposite prevailing winds bring about abrupt and irregular changes in the usually moderate weather. Winds are generally brisk. Velocities of 160 km/h (100 mph) have been reported in southern locations, and the town of Encarnación was once leveled by a tornado.

During the mild winters, July is the coldest month, with a mean temperature of about 17 °C (63 °F) in Asunción and 16 °C (61 °F) on the Paraná Plateau. The number of days with temperatures falling below freezing ranges from as few as three to as many as sixteen yearly, and with even wider variations deep in the interior. Some winters are very mild, with winds blowing constantly from the north, and little frost. During a cold winter, however, tongues of Antarctic air bring subfreezing temperatures to all areas. No part of the Paraneña region is entirely free from the possibility of frost and consequent damage to crops, and snow flurries have been reported in various locations.

Moist tropical air keeps the weather warm in the Paraneña region from October through March. In Asunción the seasonal average is about 24 °C (75 °F), with January—the warmest month—averaging 29 °C (84 °F). Villarrica has a seasonal mean temperature of 21 °C (70 °F) and a January mean of 27 °C (81 °F). During the summer, daytime temperatures reaching 38 °C (100 °F) are fairly common. Frequent waves of cool air from the south, however, cause weather that alternates between clear, humid conditions and storms. Skies will be almost cloudless for a week to ten days as temperature and humidity rise continually. As the soggy heat nears intolerable limits, thunderstorms preceding a cold front will blow in from the south, and temperatures will drop as much as 15 °C (25 °F) in a few minutes.

Rainfall in the Paraneña region is fairly evenly distributed. Although local meteorological conditions play a contributing role, rain usually falls when tropical air masses are dominant. The least rain falls in August, when averages in various parts of the region range from 200 to 100 millimeters (8 to 4 in). The two periods of maximum precipitation are March through May and October to November.

For the region as a whole, the difference between the driest and the wettest months ranges from 100 to 180 millimeters (4 to 7 in). The annual average rainfall is 1,270 millimeters (50 in), although the average on the Paraná Plateau is 250 to 380 millimeters (10 to 15 in) greater. All subregions may experience considerable variations from year to year. Asunción has recorded as much as 208 millimeters (8 in) and as little as 560 millimeters (22 in) of annual rainfall; Puerto Bertoni on the Paraná Plateau has recorded as much as 3,300 millimeters (130 in) and as little as 790 millimeters (31 in).

In contrast to the Paraneña region, the Chaco has a tropical wet-and-dry climate bordering on semi-arid. The Chaco experiences seasons that alternately flood and parch the land, yet seasonal variations in temperature are modest. Chaco temperatures are usually high, the averages dropping only slightly in winter. Even at night the air is stifling despite the usually present breezes. Rainfall is light, varying from 500 to 1,000 millimeters (20 to 39 in) per year, except in the higher land to the northwest where it is somewhat greater. Rainfall is concentrated in the summer months, and extensive areas that are deserts in winter become summer swamps.

=== Examples ===
Climate data for Asunción (1971–2000)
Month	Jan	Feb	Mar	Apr	May	Jun	Jul	Aug	Sep	Oct	Nov	Dec	Year
Record high °C (°F)	42.0 (107.6)	39.6 (103.3)	40.0 (104.0)	37 (99)	35 (95)	33.0 (91.4)	33.4 (92.1)	39.2 (102.6)	42.2 (108.0)	42.8 (109.0)	40.2 (104.4)	41.7 (107.1)	42.8 (109.0)
Mean daily maximum °C (°F)	33.5 (92.3)	32.6 (90.7)	31.6 (88.9)	28.4 (83.1)	25.0 (77.0)	23.1 (73.6)	21.9 (71.4)	24.8 (76.6)	26.4 (79.5)	29.2 (84.6)	30.7 (87.3)	32.3 (90.1)	28.3 (82.9)
Daily mean °C (°F)	27.5 (81.5)	26.9 (80.4)	25.9 (78.6)	22.8 (73.0)	19.8 (67.6)	17.9 (64.2)	17.1 (62.8)	18.6 (65.5)	20.5 (68.9)	23.2 (73.8)	24.8 (76.6)	26.5 (79.7)	22.7 (72.9)
Mean daily minimum °C (°F)	22.8 (73.0)	22.3 (72.1)	21.3 (70.3)	18.6 (65.5)	15.7 (60.3)	13.8 (56.8)	13.6 (56.5)	14.3 (57.7)	15.9 (60.6)	18.6 (65.5)	20.1 (68.2)	21.8 (71.2)	17.9 (64.2)
Record low °C (°F)	12.5 (54.5)	12.5 (54.5)	9.4 (48.9)	6.8 (44.2)	2.6 (36.7)	−1.2 (29.8)	−0.6 (30.9)	0.0 (32.0)	3.6 (38.5)	7.0 (44.6)	8.8 (47.8)	10.0 (50.0)	−1.2 (29.8)
Average rainfall mm (inches)	147.2 (5.80)	129.2 (5.09)	117.9 (4.64)	166.0 (6.54)	113.3 (4.46)	82.4 (3.24)	39.4 (1.55)	72.6 (2.86)	87.7 (3.45)	130.8 (5.15)	164.4 (6.47)	150.3 (5.92)	1,401.2 (55.17)
Average precipitation days (≥ 1.0 mm)	8	7	7	8	7	7	4	5	6	8	8	8	83
Average relative humidity (%)	68	71	72	75	76	76	70	70	66	67	67	68	70
Mean monthly sunshine hours	276	246	254	228	205	165	195	223	204	242	270	295	2,803
Source 1: World Meteorological Organization
Source 2: NOAA updated to 9/2012., Danish Meteorological Institute (sun only)

Climate data for Ciudad del Este
Month	Jan	Feb	Mar	Apr	May	Jun	Jul	Aug	Sep	Oct	Nov	Dec	Year
Record high °C (°F)	38.0 (100.4)	38.8 (101.8)	38.0 (100.4)	35.0 (95.0)	32.5 (90.5)	31.2 (88.2)	33.0 (91.4)	33.4 (92.1)	35.6 (96.1)	37.0 (98.6)	39.6 (103.3)	40.6 (105.1)	40.6 (105.1)
Mean daily maximum °C (°F)	31.7 (89.1)	31.6 (88.9)	30.8 (87.4)	27.5 (81.5)	24.6 (76.3)	22.2 (72.0)	23.0 (73.4)	24.2 (75.6)	25.8 (78.4)	28.4 (83.1)	30.1 (86.2)	31.2 (88.2)	27.6 (81.7)
Daily mean °C (°F)	26.1 (79.0)	25.8 (78.4)	24.7 (76.5)	21.5 (70.7)	18.4 (65.1)	16.3 (61.3)	16.4 (61.5)	17.6 (63.7)	19.3 (66.7)	22.1 (71.8)	24.1 (75.4)	25.6 (78.1)	21.5 (70.7)
Mean daily minimum °C (°F)	21.1 (70.0)	21.3 (70.3)	20.1 (68.2)	17.2 (63.0)	13.6 (56.5)	11.4 (52.5)	11.3 (52.3)	12.3 (54.1)	13.8 (56.8)	16.6 (61.9)	18.3 (64.9)	20.1 (68.2)	16.4 (61.5)
Record low °C (°F)	10.5 (50.9)	11.6 (52.9)	7.5 (45.5)	4.6 (40.3)	−0.2 (31.6)	0.0 (32.0)	−3.0 (26.6)	−1.0 (30.2)	0.8 (33.4)	4.0 (39.2)	6.4 (43.5)	8.2 (46.8)	−3.0 (26.6)
Average precipitation mm (inches)	184.1 (7.25)	154.2 (6.07)	136.1 (5.36)	140.7 (5.54)	132.3 (5.21)	131.9 (5.19)	90.6 (3.57)	115.0 (4.53)	130.2 (5.13)	176.0 (6.93)	163.5 (6.44)	139.9 (5.51)	1,694.5 (66.71)
Average precipitation days (≥ 0.1 mm)	10	9	8	7	8	8	7	8	9	10	9	9	101
Average relative humidity (%)	75	77	77	80	83	84	79	77	75	74	72	72	77
Source: NOAA

Climate data for Encarnación (1961–1990)
Month	Jan	Feb	Mar	Apr	May	Jun	Jul	Aug	Sep	Oct	Nov	Dec	Year
Record high °C (°F)	40.5 (104.9)	39.4 (102.9)	39.3 (102.7)	35.4 (95.7)	34.0 (93.2)	31.6 (88.9)	32.4 (90.3)	34.8 (94.6)	36.6 (97.9)	38.0 (100.4)	40.4 (104.7)	42.0 (107.6)	42.0 (107.6)
Mean daily maximum °C (°F)	31.2 (88.2)	30.6 (87.1)	29.2 (84.6)	25.9 (78.6)	23.2 (73.8)	20.9 (69.6)	21.4 (70.5)	22.5 (72.5)	23.9 (75.0)	26.5 (79.7)	28.4 (83.1)	30.5 (86.9)	26.2 (79.2)
Daily mean °C (°F)	25.5 (77.9)	24.9 (76.8)	23.4 (74.1)	20.0 (68.0)	17.3 (63.1)	15.2 (59.4)	15.5 (59.9)	16.6 (61.9)	18.1 (64.6)	20.6 (69.1)	22.7 (72.9)	24.8 (76.6)	20.4 (68.7)
Mean daily minimum °C (°F)	19.4 (66.9)	19.5 (67.1)	17.9 (64.2)	14.3 (57.7)	11.7 (53.1)	9.9 (49.8)	10.2 (50.4)	10.8 (51.4)	12.3 (54.1)	14.3 (57.7)	16.3 (61.3)	18.3 (64.9)	14.6 (58.3)
Record low °C (°F)	9.3 (48.7)	7.0 (44.6)	5.4 (41.7)	2.4 (36.3)	−1.7 (28.9)	−3.8 (25.2)	−3.8 (25.2)	−2.8 (27.0)	−0.6 (30.9)	1.6 (34.9)	4.8 (40.6)	7.0 (44.6)	−3.8 (25.2)
Average precipitation mm (inches)	152.2 (5.99)	160.6 (6.32)	142.4 (5.61)	162.2 (6.39)	144.2 (5.68)	135.8 (5.35)	102.7 (4.04)	116.9 (4.60)	149.5 (5.89)	181.7 (7.15)	161.5 (6.36)	150.0 (5.91)	1,759.7 (69.28)
Average precipitation days (≥ 0.1 mm)	9	8	7	8	7	8	8	8	9	9	9	9	98
Average relative humidity (%)	69	74	75	77	79	78	76	74	72	70	69	67	73
Mean monthly sunshine hours	254.2	220.4	220.1	171.0	179.8	159.0	189.1	182.9	153.0	201.5	252.0	269.7	2,452.7
Mean daily sunshine hours	8.2	7.8	7.1	5.7	5.8	5.3	6.1	5.9	5.1	6.5	8.4	8.7	6.7
Source 1: NOAA
Source 2: Deutscher Wetterdienst (sun, 1988–1996)

Climate data for Concepción (1961–1990, extremes 1937–present)
Month	Jan	Feb	Mar	Apr	May	Jun	Jul	Aug	Sep	Oct	Nov	Dec	Year
Record high °C (°F)	43.0 (109.4)	41.0 (105.8)	40.0 (104.0)	38.2 (100.8)	35.0 (95.0)	34.8 (94.6)	36.2 (97.2)	38.4 (101.1)	40.8 (105.4)	41.8 (107.2)	42.6 (108.7)	41.4 (106.5)	43.0 (109.4)
Mean daily maximum °C (°F)	33.4 (92.1)	33.2 (91.8)	32.2 (90.0)	29.3 (84.7)	26.6 (79.9)	24.3 (75.7)	25.1 (77.2)	26.5 (79.7)	27.8 (82.0)	30.7 (87.3)	32.0 (89.6)	32.6 (90.7)	29.5 (85.1)
Daily mean °C (°F)	27.6 (81.7)	27.3 (81.1)	26.2 (79.2)	23.5 (74.3)	20.3 (68.5)	18.5 (65.3)	18.7 (65.7)	20.0 (68.0)	21.8 (71.2)	24.5 (76.1)	26.0 (78.8)	27.2 (81.0)	23.5 (74.3)
Mean daily minimum °C (°F)	22.7 (72.9)	22.5 (72.5)	21.3 (70.3)	18.5 (65.3)	15.9 (60.6)	13.8 (56.8)	13.3 (55.9)	14.3 (57.7)	16.1 (61.0)	18.6 (65.5)	20.2 (68.4)	21.7 (71.1)	18.2 (64.8)
Record low °C (°F)	12.5 (54.5)	12.0 (53.6)	8.0 (46.4)	5.3 (41.5)	2.5 (36.5)	0.0 (32.0)	−1.5 (29.3)	−3.0 (26.6)	1.8 (35.2)	5.7 (42.3)	10.0 (50.0)	11.4 (52.5)	−3.0 (26.6)
Average precipitation mm (inches)	152.8 (6.02)	122.8 (4.83)	140.1 (5.52)	122.9 (4.84)	124.8 (4.91)	62.3 (2.45)	42.6 (1.68)	55.8 (2.20)	67.7 (2.67)	124.7 (4.91)	161.8 (6.37)	163.5 (6.44)	1,341.8 (52.83)
Average precipitation days (≥ 0.1 mm)	10	9	8	7	7	7	5	6	7	8	8	10	92
Average relative humidity (%)	69	73	74	76	77	77	72	70	68	67	67	70	72
Mean monthly sunshine hours	224	213	217	184	182	152	183	156	173	208	222	222	2,336
Source 1: NOAA (July, November, and December record highs, and March, April, May, August, and October record lows), Meteo Climat (record highs and lows)
Source 2: Deutscher Wetterdienst (sun)

Climate data for Pilar
Month	Jan	Feb	Mar	Apr	May	Jun	Jul	Aug	Sep	Oct	Nov	Dec	Year
Record high °C (°F)	42.4 (108.3)	40.5 (104.9)	39.6 (103.3)	36.5 (97.7)	33.7 (92.7)	31.8 (89.2)	33.2 (91.8)	34.9 (94.8)	38.0 (100.4)	39.6 (103.3)	40.4 (104.7)	41.6 (106.9)	42.4 (108.3)
Mean daily maximum °C (°F)	33.1 (91.6)	32.3 (90.1)	30.6 (87.1)	27.0 (80.6)	24.2 (75.6)	21.5 (70.7)	21.7 (71.1)	23.0 (73.4)	24.9 (76.8)	28.1 (82.6)	29.9 (85.8)	32.2 (90.0)	27.4 (81.3)
Daily mean °C (°F)	27.6 (81.7)	26.9 (80.4)	25.3 (77.5)	22.0 (71.6)	19.2 (66.6)	16.4 (61.5)	16.5 (61.7)	17.5 (63.5)	19.4 (66.9)	22.5 (72.5)	24.7 (76.5)	26.8 (80.2)	22.1 (71.8)
Mean daily minimum °C (°F)	22.4 (72.3)	22.1 (71.8)	20.7 (69.3)	17.4 (63.3)	14.9 (58.8)	12.1 (53.8)	12.0 (53.6)	12.6 (54.7)	14.3 (57.7)	17.2 (63.0)	19.3 (66.7)	21.3 (70.3)	17.2 (63.0)
Record low °C (°F)	14.5 (58.1)	12.1 (53.8)	8.5 (47.3)	7.7 (45.9)	4.0 (39.2)	1.0 (33.8)	0.7 (33.3)	1.0 (33.8)	3.6 (38.5)	7.4 (45.3)	9.8 (49.6)	9.8 (49.6)	0.7 (33.3)
Average precipitation mm (inches)	168.9 (6.65)	141.5 (5.57)	161.0 (6.34)	178.5 (7.03)	95.3 (3.75)	61.8 (2.43)	57.9 (2.28)	47.1 (1.85)	82.9 (3.26)	135.2 (5.32)	157.2 (6.19)	125.7 (4.95)	1,413 (55.63)
Average precipitation days (≥ 0.1 mm)	9	8	9	8	6	6	5	6	7	9	9	8	90
Average relative humidity (%)	69	72	75	78	79	79	76	74	71	69	69	67	73
Source: NOAA

== Environment ==
Current environmental issues include deforestation (Paraguay lost an estimated 20,000 km^{2} of forest land between 1958 and 1985) and water pollution (inadequate means for waste disposal present health risks for many urban residents). Paraguay is a party to the United Nations Framework Convention on Climate Change, the Climate Change-Kyoto Protocol, the Law of the Sea, and the Ozone Layer Protection. It has also signed, but not ratified, the Nuclear Test Ban.

== Statistics ==
Geographic coordinates
- 23°00′S 58°00′W

Area
- Total: 406,750 square kilometres (157,050 sq mi)
  - country rank in the world: 59th
- Land: 397,300 square kilometres (153,400 sq mi)
- Water: 9,450 square kilometres (3,650 sq mi)

Area comparative
- Australia comparative: slightly more than 1/2 the size of New South Wales
- Canada comparative: approximately the size of Newfoundland and Labrador
- United Kingdom comparative: approximately 1 2/3 times the size of the United Kingdom
- United States comparative: slightly more than twice the size of Nebraska
- EU comparative: slightly more than 4/5 the size of Spain
Land boundaries
- Total: 3,920 kilometres (2,440 mi)
- Border countries:
  - Argentina: 1,880 kilometres (1,170 mi)
  - Bolivia: 750 kilometres (470 mi)
  - Brazil 1,290 kilometres (800 mi)

Coastline
- 0 km (landlocked)

Elevation extremes
- Lowest point: Junction of Rio Paraguay and Rio Paraná 46 metres (151 ft)
- Highest point: Cerro Peró 842 metres (2,762 ft)

Land use
- Arable land: 6%
- Permanent crops: 0%
- Permanent pastures: 55%
- Forests and woodland: 32%
- Other: 7% (1993 est.)

Irrigated land
- 670 square kilometres (260 sq mi) (1993 est.)

== Extreme points ==
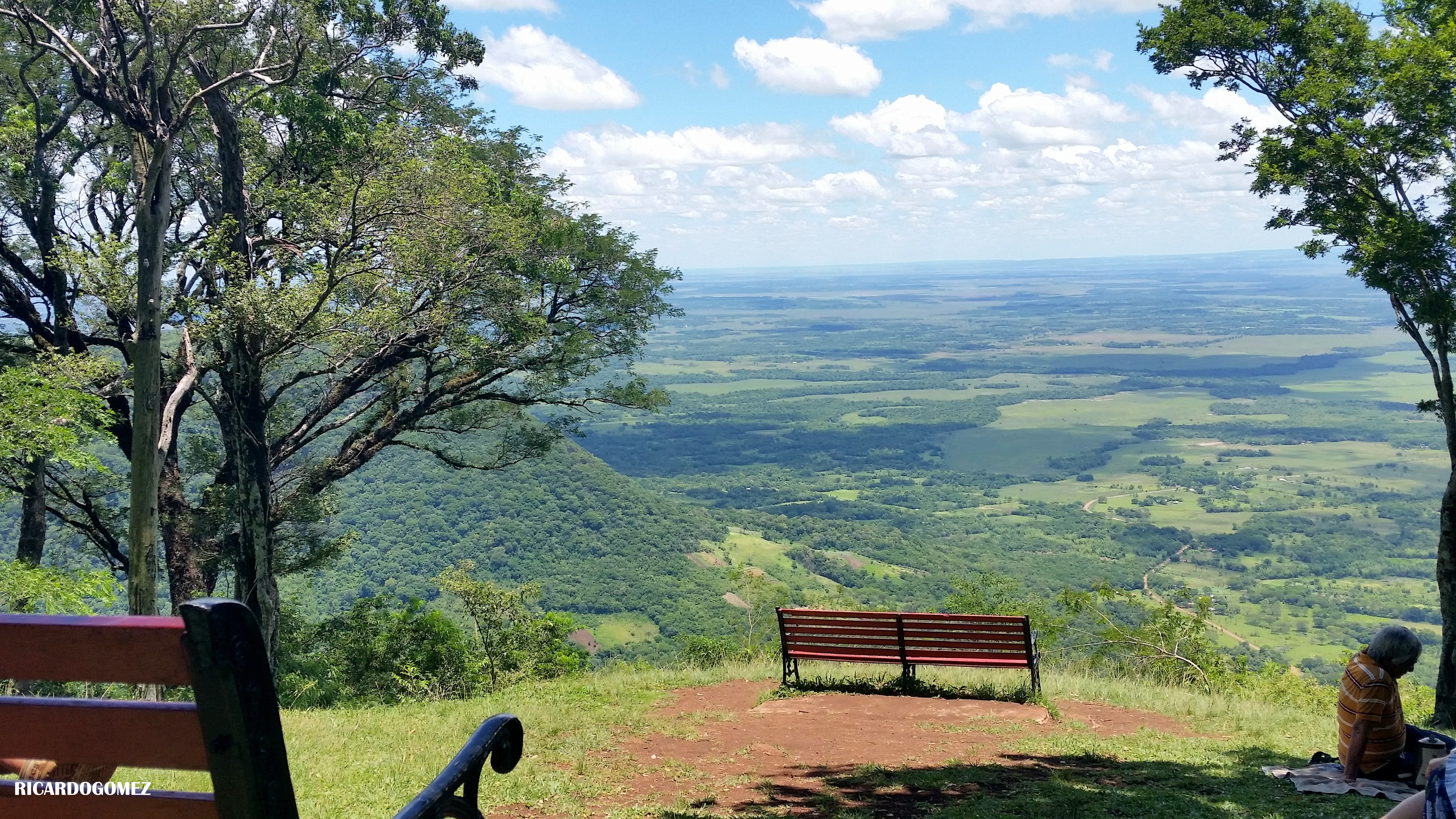
Cerro Akatí, near Villarrica, Paraguay.

This is a list of the extreme points of Paraguay, the points that are farther north, south, east or west than any other location.

- Northernmost point – the Hito VII Fortin Coronel Sanchez pillar on the border with Bolivia, Alto Paraguay Department
- Easternmost point – unnamed headland in the Itaipu reservoir near the town of Álvar Núñez Cabeza de Vaca, Canindeyú Department
- Southernmost point (including islands) – unnamed island south of Isla Talavera in the Rio Paraná, Itapúa Department
- Southernmost point (mainland only) – unnamed headland southeast of the town of Cambyretá and immediately north of the Argentinian town of Candelaria, Itapúa Department
- Westernmost point – the Hito I Esmeralda pillar on the border with Argentina and Bolivia, Boquerón Department
- Highest point – Cerro Tres Kandú, Guairá Department, 842 m
- Lowest point – junction of Rio Paraguay and Rio Parana, 46 m
- Geographic center – 133 km west of Concepción

== See also ==
- Paraguay
- List of cities in Paraguay
