= Hito Esmeralda =

Geographical tripoint in South America

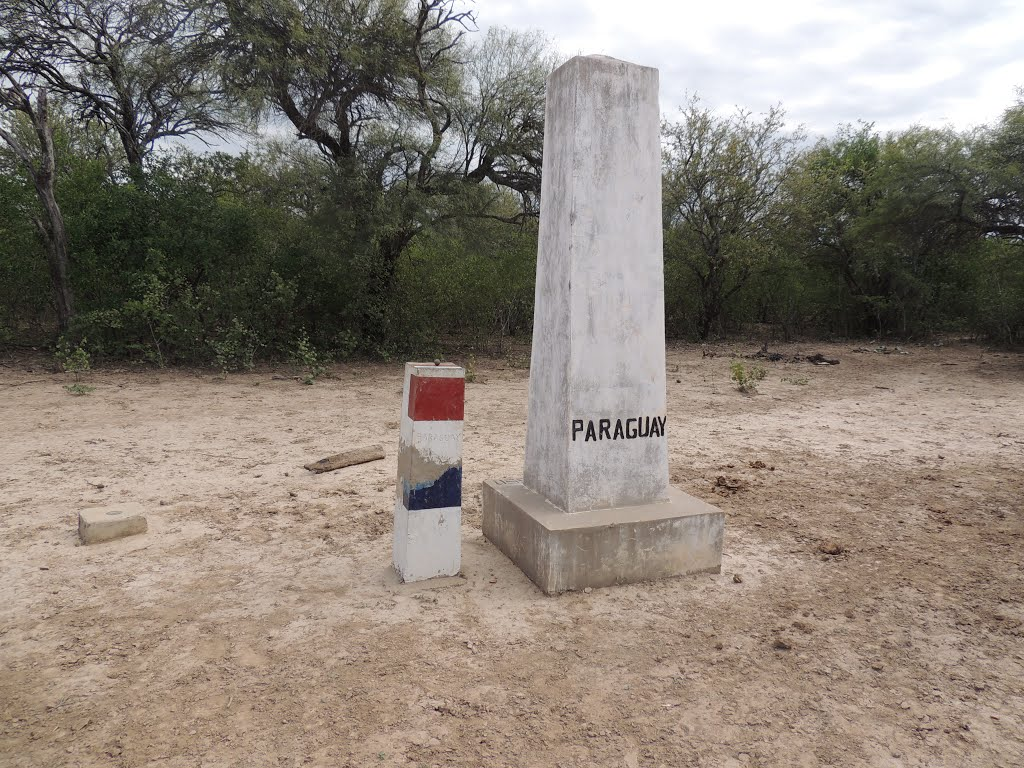

The Hito Esmeralda (English: Emerald Landmark) is a tripoint where Argentina, Bolivia and Paraguay meet. This geographical point is at the edge of Pilcomayo River, at an altitude of 200 m (660 ft), with coordinates of 22°13′31″S 62°38′11″W.

Located within the region called Gran Chaco, the boundary marker marks a triple border region in South America; It is located more precisely 8 km (5 mi) northeast of the Argentine town of Santa Victoria Este and 8 km north of La Merced Mission, both in the province of Salta.

[update] Since 14 June 2016, the Hito Esmeralda no longer is the tripoint marker. The real tripoint used to be a -so called - wet tripoint. So, at 2.650 mtr. from the wet tripoint the 'Hito Esmeralda' was placed. Due to circomstances the real tripoint became a dry tripoint, reason for placing a new (real) tripoint marker off 4,5 mtrs high on June 14th 2016.

The Chaco limit was established by Hayes Case in 1878, and by the treaty complementary to the limits of 1939 signed in Buenos Aires, and ratified in Asunción in 1945. and ratified in La Paz in 2016.
