= Santa Victoria Este =

- City
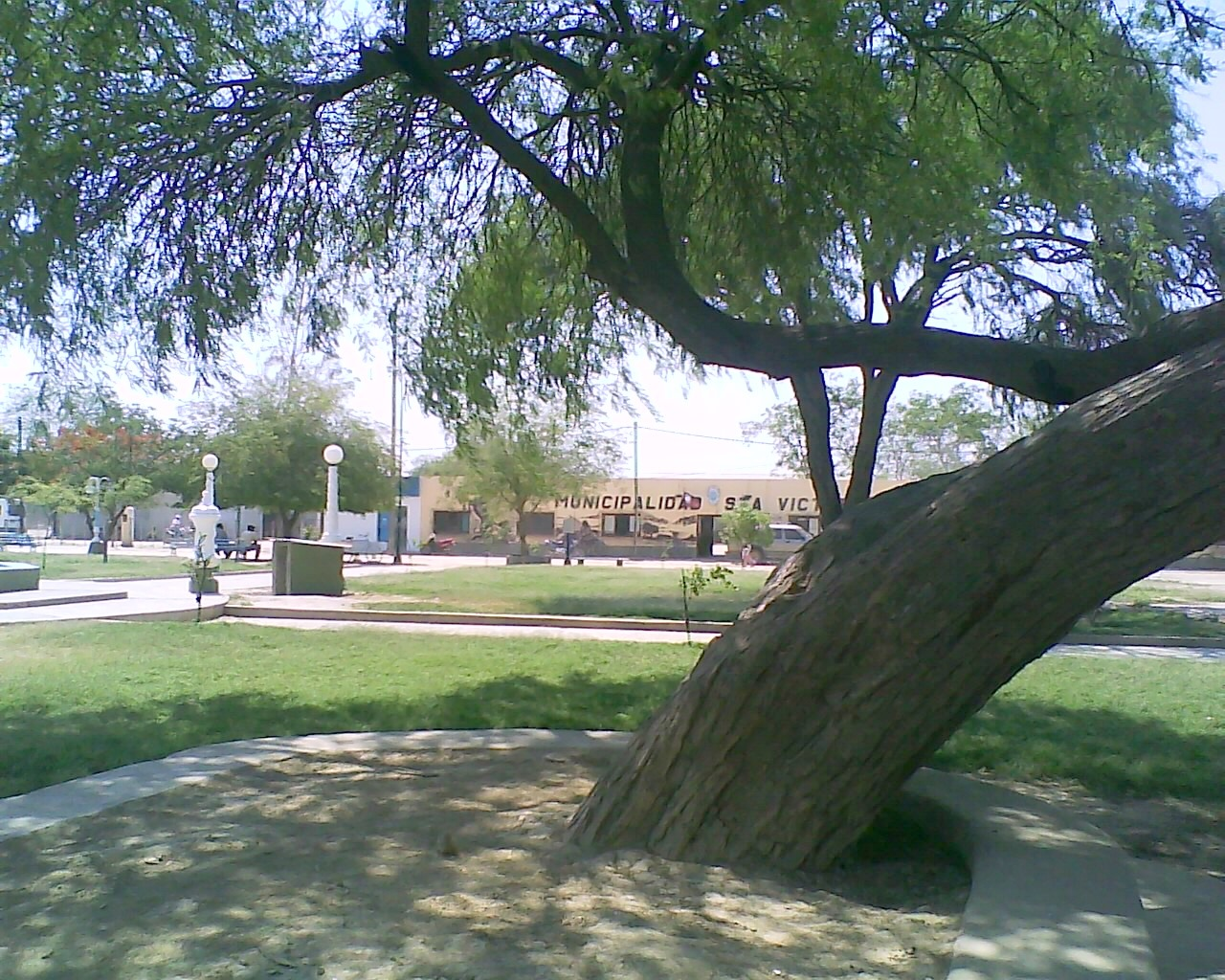
- Santa Victoria Este, Argentina

- Location in Argentina
- Coordinates: 22°16′30″S 62°42′50″W
- Country: Argentina
- Province: Salta

Population (2010 census [INDEC])
  - Total: 1,283
- Time zone: UTC−3 (ART)

Santa Victoria Este is an Argentine town in northeastern Salta Province in the Department of Rivadavia. According to the 2010 Census, it has a population of 1,283.

== Climate ==
Climate data for Santa Victoria Este (Temperature normals and records: 1993–2018; Precipitation normals: 1981-2010)
Month	Jan	Feb	Mar	Apr	May	Jun	Jul	Aug	Sep	Oct	Nov	Dec	Year
Record high °C (°F)	45.0 (113.0)	45.0 (113.0)	43.5 (110.3)	40.5 (104.9)	38.5 (101.3)	37.0 (98.6)	39.0 (102.2)	43.0 (109.4)	44.5 (112.1)	46.4 (115.5)	45.8 (114.4)	45.0 (113.0)	46.4 (115.5)
Mean daily maximum °C (°F)	36.1 (97.0)	34.6 (94.3)	32.9 (91.2)	29.6 (85.3)	26.1 (79.0)	24.1 (75.4)	25.1 (77.2)	28.7 (83.7)	31.6 (88.9)	33.9 (93.0)	35.1 (95.2)	35.7 (96.3)	31.1 (88.0)
Daily mean °C (°F)	28.9 (84.0)	27.8 (82.0)	26.2 (79.2)	23.3 (73.9)	19.7 (67.5)	17.6 (63.7)	17.5 (63.5)	20.6 (69.1)	23.5 (74.3)	26.5 (79.7)	27.8 (82.0)	28.6 (83.5)	24.0 (75.2)
Mean daily minimum °C (°F)	22.3 (72.1)	21.8 (71.2)	20.5 (68.9)	18.1 (64.6)	14.4 (57.9)	12.1 (53.8)	10.9 (51.6)	13.2 (55.8)	15.9 (60.6)	19.7 (67.5)	20.9 (69.6)	22.1 (71.8)	17.7 (63.9)
Record low °C (°F)	12.6 (54.7)	11.5 (52.7)	11.4 (52.5)	3.5 (38.3)	3.0 (37.4)	−1.0 (30.2)	−4.0 (24.8)	−2.0 (28.4)	2.0 (35.6)	8.0 (46.4)	10.0 (50.0)	10.6 (51.1)	−4.0 (24.8)
Average precipitation mm (inches)	120.6 (4.75)	109.1 (4.30)	114.1 (4.49)	57.8 (2.28)	21.1 (0.83)	7.0 (0.28)	3.4 (0.13)	3.0 (0.12)	10.5 (0.41)	35.9 (1.41)	87.0 (3.43)	105.2 (4.14)	674.7 (26.56)
Source: Red Hidrológica Nacional
