= Pilcomayo River =

River of Argentina

Pilcomayo Ysyry Araguay
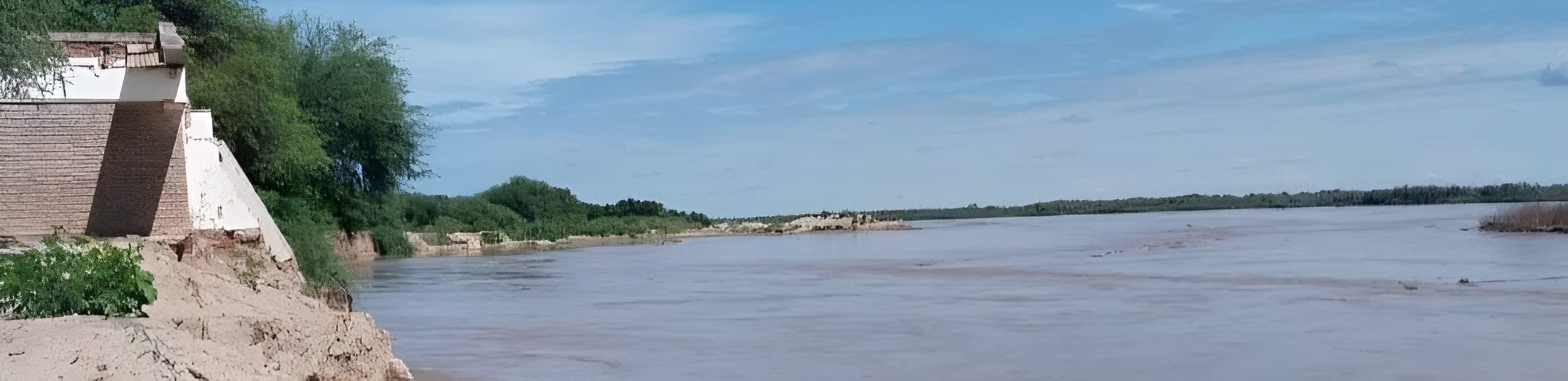
- Pilcomayo River, in the Dry Chaco

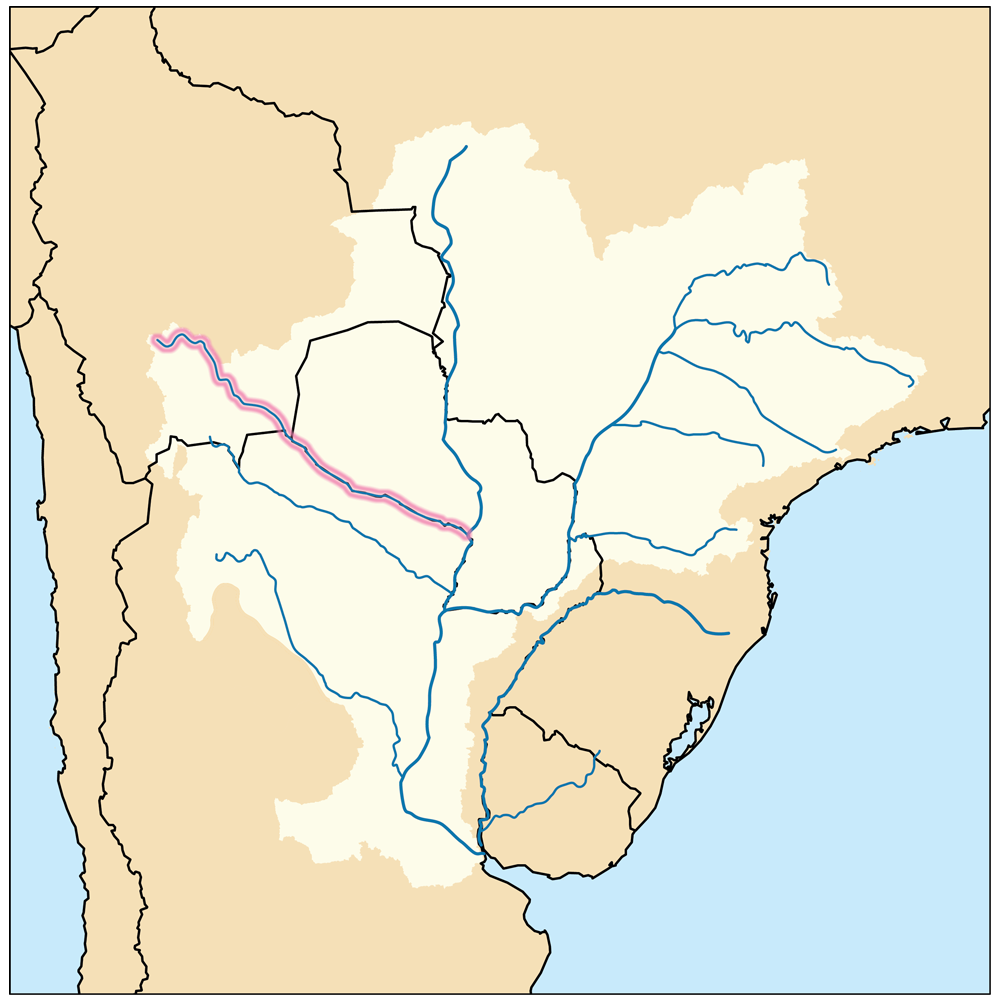
- Map of the Rio de la Plata Basin, highlighting the Pilcomayo river
- Etymology: Quechua
- Native name: Pillkumayu (Quechua)

Location
- Countries: Argentina; Bolivia; Paraguay

Physical characteristics
- Source: Most distant source of Pilcomayo-Pilaya-Camblaya-San Juan-Orosmayo-Ajedrez-Porvenir System
  - location: East slopes of Cerro Sipisami, Jujui Province, Argentina
  - coordinates: approximately 22°51′52″S 66°32′55″W
  - elevation: approximately 4800 m
- 2nd source: Most distant source of main stem Pilcomayo
  - location: Municipio Santiago de Huari, Oruro, Bolivia
  - coordinates: 19°23′36″S 66°25′5″W
  - elevation: 4820 metres
- Mouth: Confluence with Paraguay River
  - location: Near Asunción, Paraguay
  - coordinates: 25°16′40″S 57°40′16″W

Ramsar Wetland
- Official name: Rio Pilcomayo
- Designated: 4 May 1992
- Reference no.: 557

Pilcomayo (in Hispanicized spelling) (Quechua: Pillkumayu or Pillku Mayu, pillku red, mayu river, "red river"; Guarani: Ysyry Araguay [ʔɨsɨˈɾɨ ʔaɾaɰʷaˈɨ]) is a river in central South America. At 1,100 kilometres (680 mi) long, it is the longest western tributary of the Paraguay River. Its drainage basin is 270,000 square kilometres (100,000 sq mi) in area, and its mean discharge is 200 cubic metres per second (7,100 cu ft/s).

Along its course, the Pilcomayo silts up and splits into two main branches, North and South. After some distance, these branches rejoin to form the Lower Pilcomayo.

The Pilcomayo rises in the foothills of the Andes mountain range in the Oruro Department in Bolivia, east of Lake Poopó. The Jach'a Juqhu River is considered the origin of the Pilcomayo. Upstream the Jach'a Juqhu River successively receives the names Aguas Calientes and Kachi Mayu. From the confluence with the Chillawa (Chillahua), the river is called Pilcomayo. From there, it flows in a southeasterly direction through Chuquisaca and Tarija departments, passes through the Argentine province of Formosa and the Gran Chaco plains of Paraguay, forming most of the border between these two countries before it joins the Paraguay River near Asunción. The Río Pilcomayo National Park is located on the Argentine side of the border. It also forms a short part of the boundary between Argentina and Bolivia, just prior to the Argentina–Bolivia–Paraguay tripoint.

== Human settlement ==
The river basin is home to approximately 1.5 million people: one million in Bolivia, 300,000 in Argentina, and 200,000 in Paraguay.

The Nakotoi Indian Tribe resides in the southern region of the Pilcomayo, a region located along the river in central Paraguay. The aborigines of this tribe are descendants of the highly renowned Redskin Tribe. The Natokoi treated all neighbors as enemies, but none more so than the Tobas Tribe and the Nimká Tribe, their respective neighbors to the southwest and northeast. Guerrilla warfare has long existed between the tribes, isolating the tribe from direct intercourse with the European settlers in the late 19th century. Men of this tribe are generally tall and skinny, built like hunters or warriors, whereas women are short in size. The Natokoi dress in a rug, fastened around the waist-line.

== Gallery ==
Local fishermen with fishing nets crossing Rio Pilcomayo 1908.

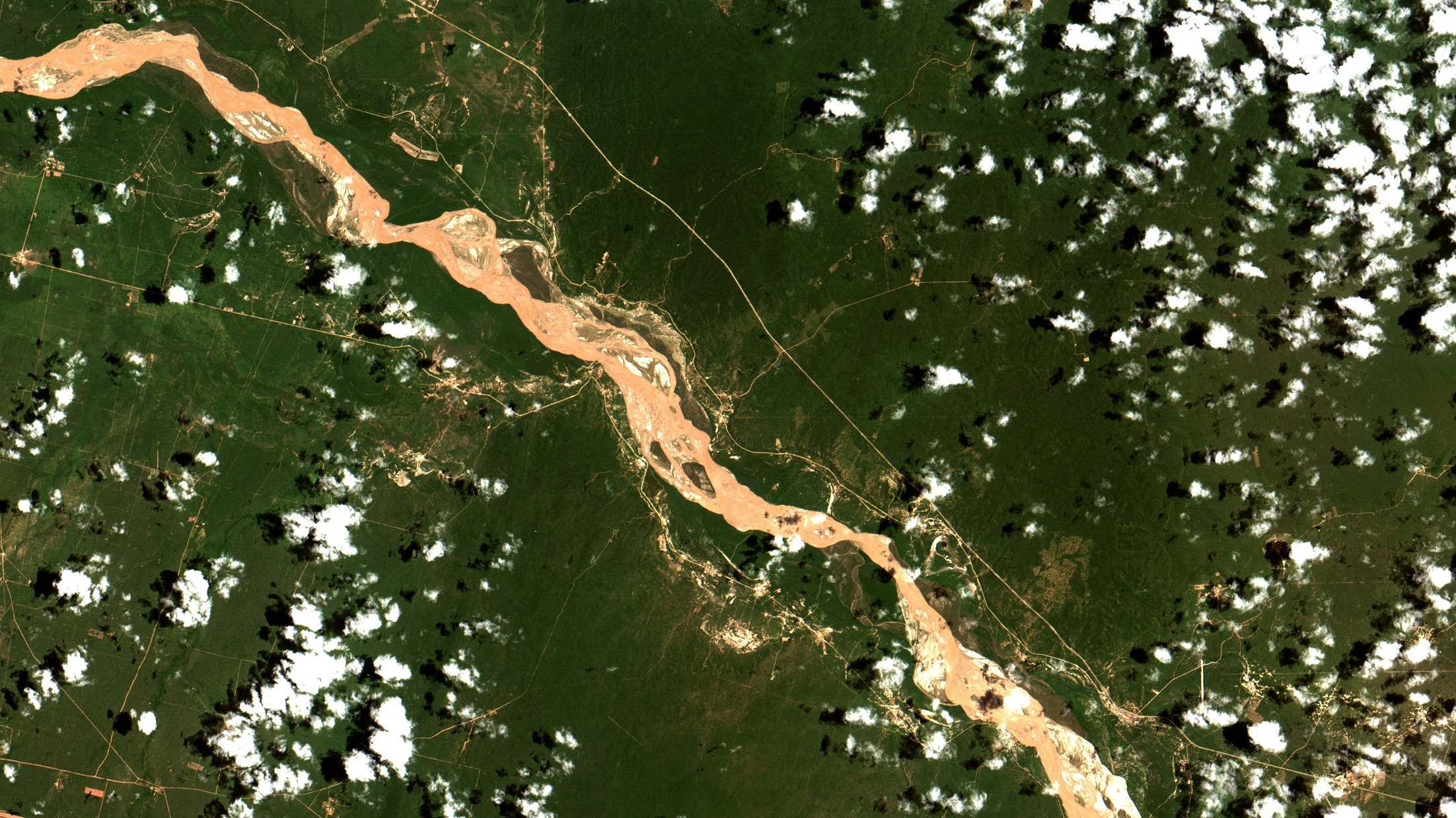
Pilcomayo River as seen through Tarija Department, Bolivia.

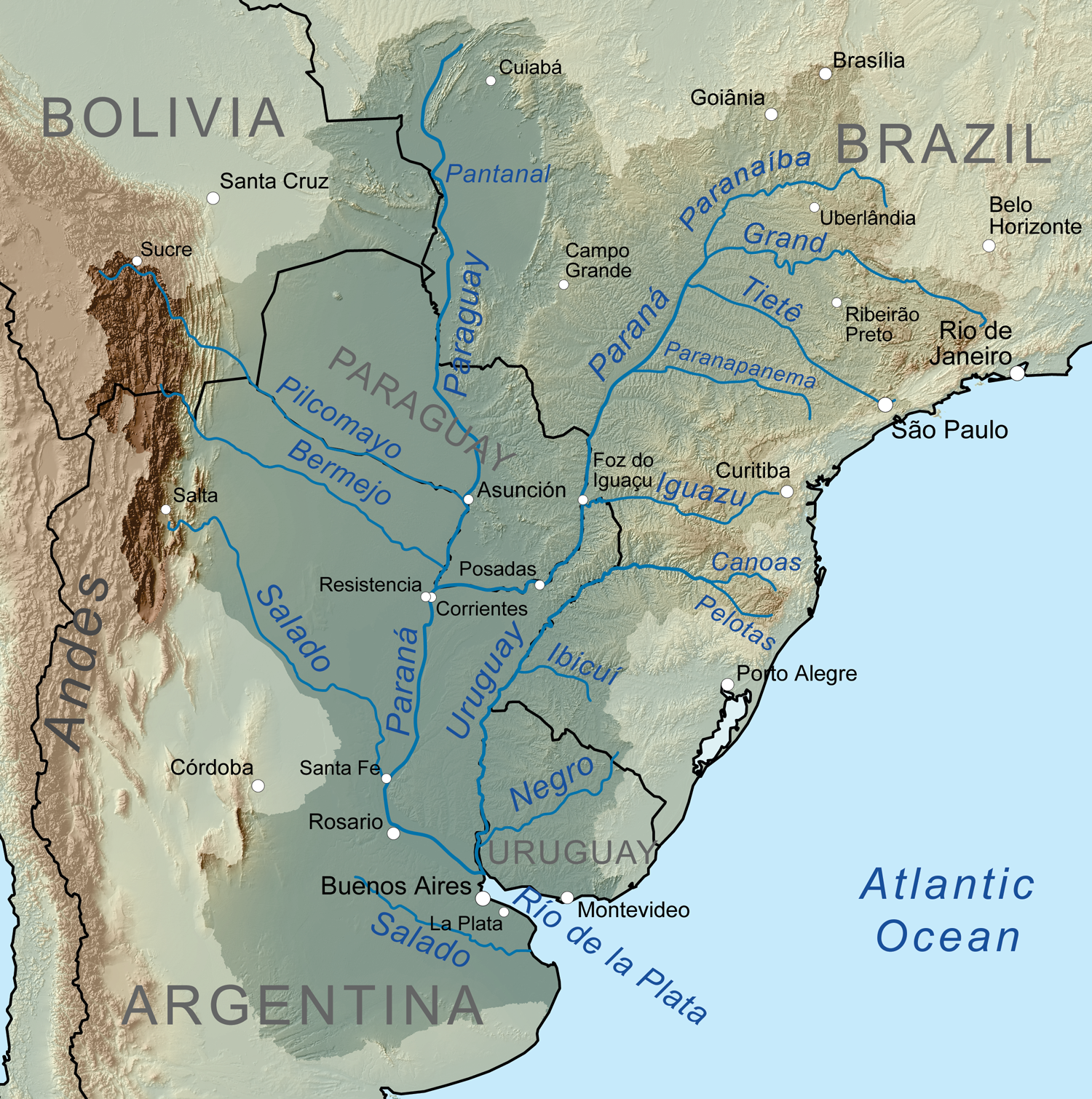
Map of the Rio de la Plata Basin.

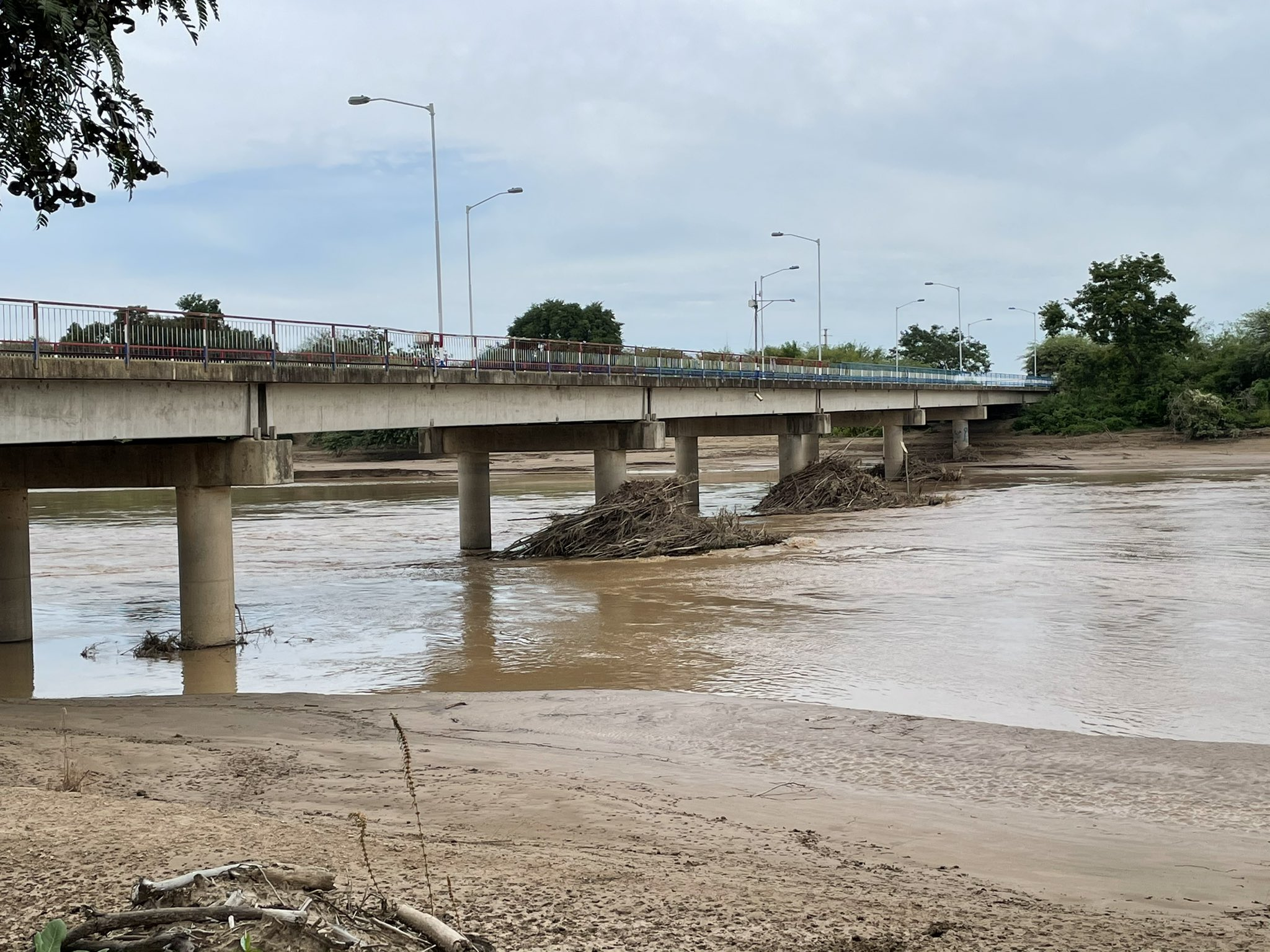
The Misión La Paz Bridge over the Pilcomayo River, between Pozo Hondo, Boquerón and Misión La Paz, Salta, (PY)-(AR) border.

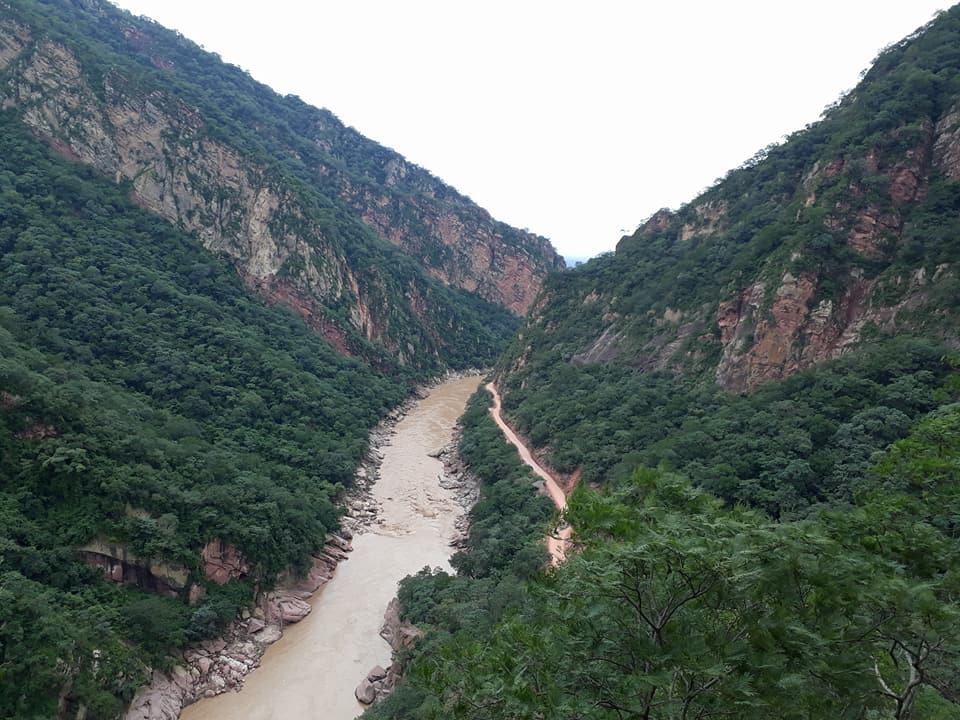
The Pilcomayo River seen at the Aguaragüe National Park and Integrated Management Natural Area, in Bolivia

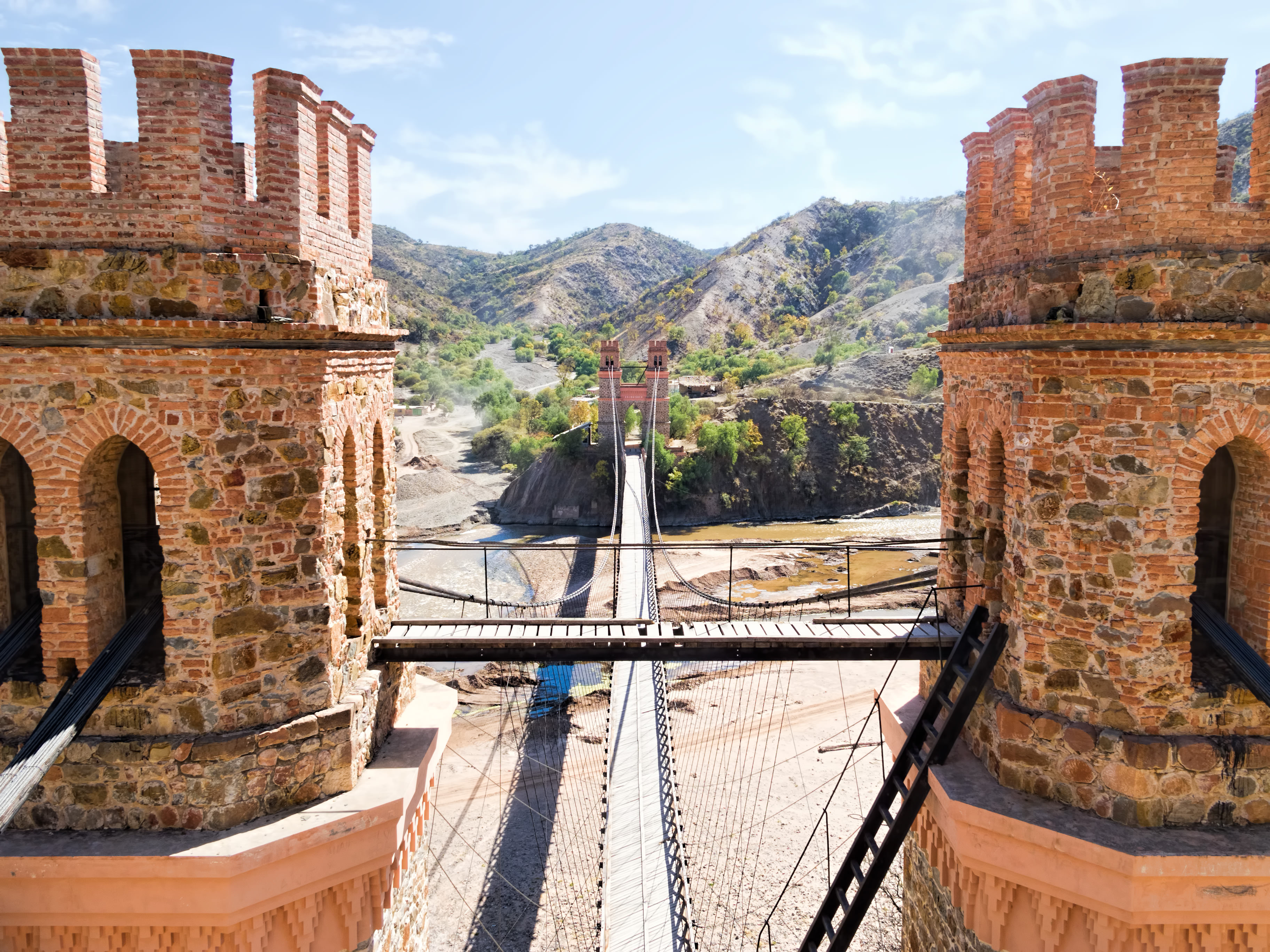
A 19th century-built footbridge over the Pilcomayo River as seen at Bolivia's Route 5, between Sucre and Potosí, Southern Bolivia.

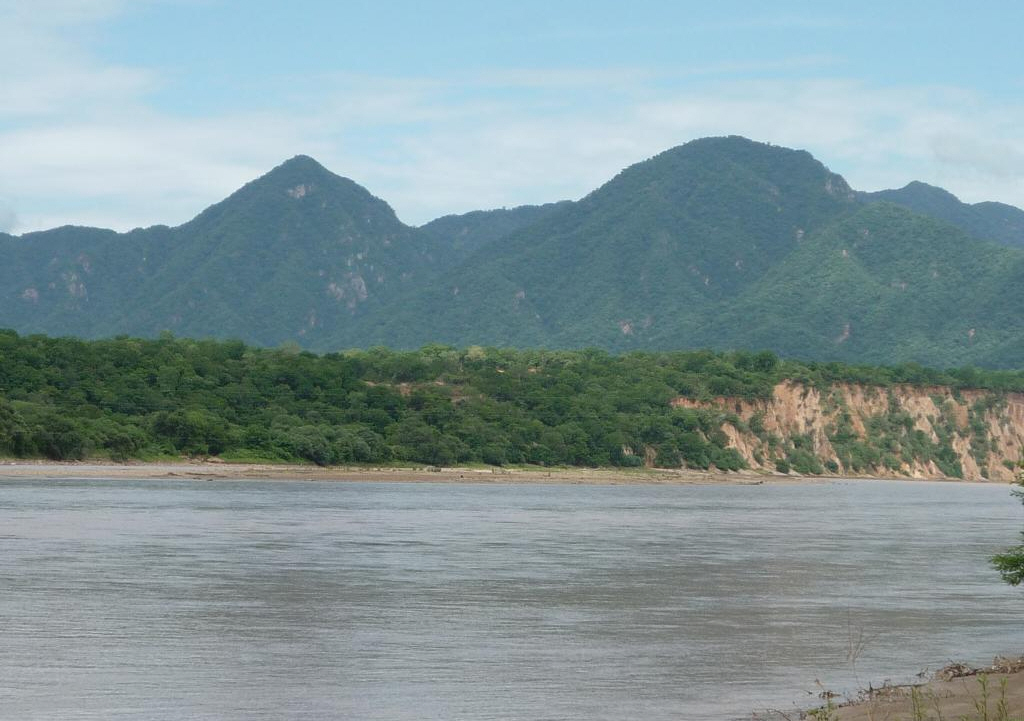
Pilcomayo Valley, near Villamontes, Bolivia.

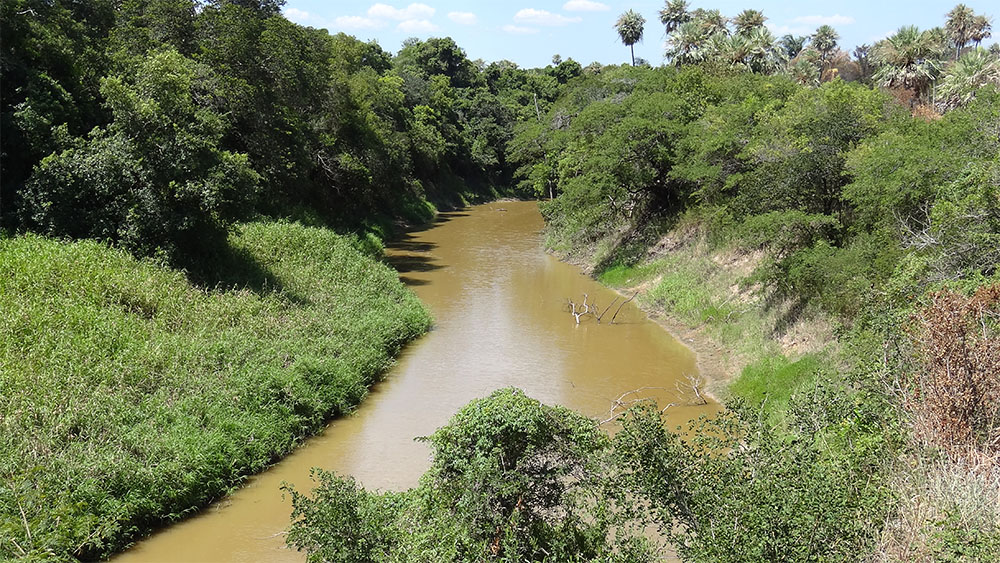
Pilcomayo River seen at the Río Pilcomayo National Park, Argentina

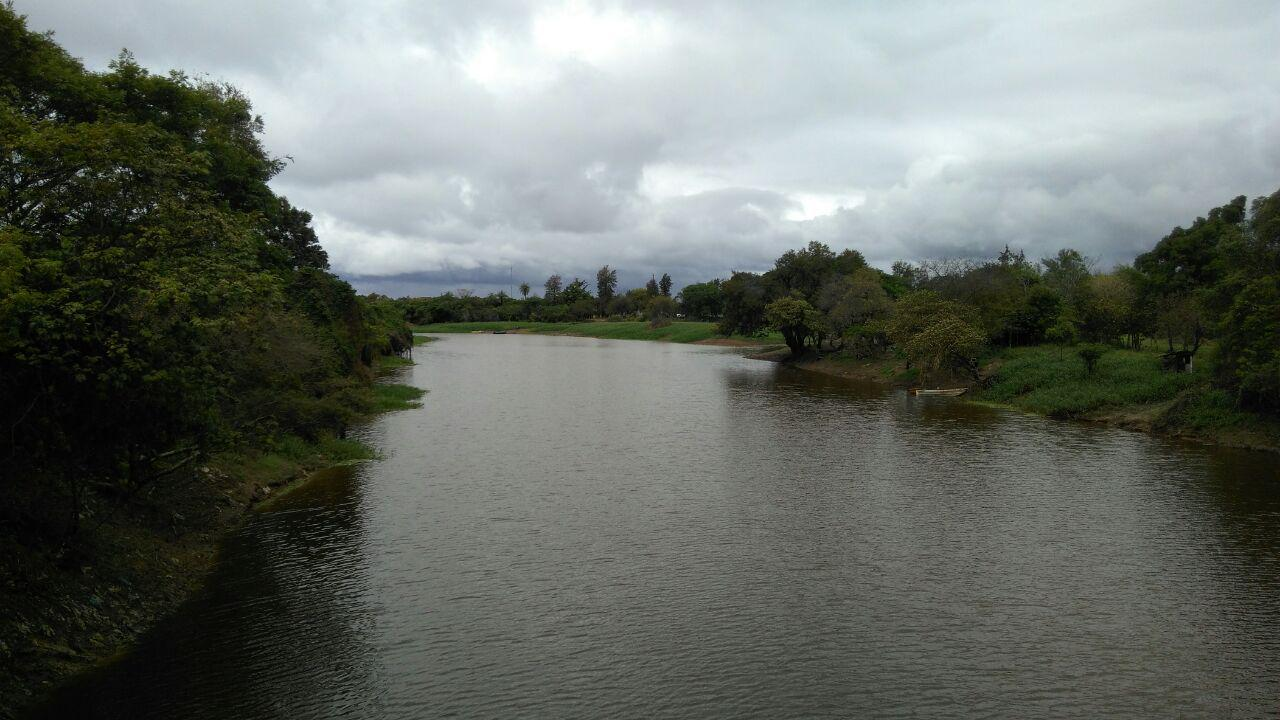
Pilcomayo River, near Asunción.

== See also ==
- List of rivers of Argentina
- List of rivers of Paraguay
- List of rivers of Bolivia
- Hito Esmeralda
- Oroncota, Yampara settlement and Inca fortress in the Pilcomayo River valley of Bolivia.
- Gran Chaco

== Sources ==
- Kerr, Graham. A Naturalist in the Gran Chaco. Cambridge: Cambridge UP, 1950.
- Pilcomayo River. (2010). In Encyclopædia Britannica. Retrieved January 18, 2010, from Encyclopædia Britannica Online: http://www.britannica.com/EBchecked/topic/460371/Pilcomayo-River
- W. H. Strosnider, F. Llanos, R.W. Nairn: LEGACY OF NEARLY 500 YEARS OF MINING IN POTOSÍ, BOLIVIA: STREAM WATER QUALITY (pdf) - conference paper at the 2008 National Meeting of the American Society of Mining and Reclamation. New Opportunities to Apply Our Science, June 14–19, Richmond, VA.
