= Aerolíneas Argentinas Flight 706 =

1975 aircraft hijacking in Argentina

Aerolineas Argentinas Flight 706
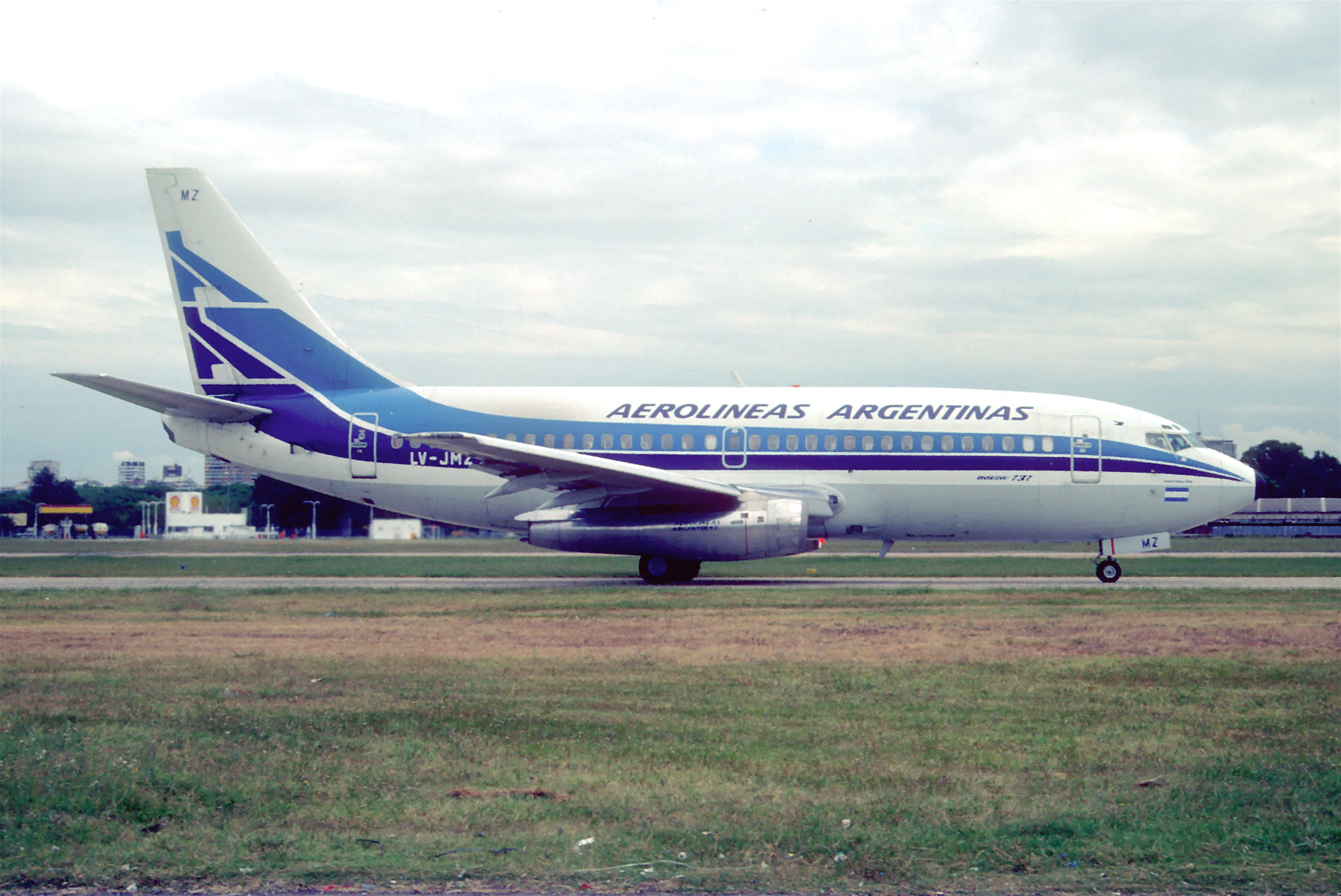
- An Aerolineas Argentinas Boeing 737-200 similar to the aircraft involved

Hijacking
- Date: 5 October 1975
- Summary: Aircraft hijacking perpetrated by the Peronist guerrilla group Montoneros
- Site: Near Monte Caseros, Province of Corrientes

Aircraft
- Aircraft type: Boeing 737-287C
- Aircraft name: City of Trelew
- Operator: Aerolineas Argentinas
- Registration: LV-JNE
- Flight origin: Aeroparque Jorge Newbery, Buenos Aires, Argentina
- Stopover: Doctor Fernando Piragine Niveyro International Airport, Corrientes, Argentina
- Destination: Formosa International Airport, Formosa, Argentina
- Occupants: 108
- Passengers: 102
- Crew: 6
- Fatalities: 0
- Injuries: 0
- Survivors: 108

Aerolineas Argentinas Flight 706 was a domestic flight scheduled on October 5, 1975, between the Argentine cities of Buenos Aires and Formosa, with a layover in Corrientes.

The Boeing 737-287C operated by Aerolineas Argentinas was hijacked by a command of the Peronist guerrilla group Montoneros to ensure the escape of about 30 guerrillas who had participated in the failed attempt to take over the 29th Forest Infantry Regiment, known as Operation Primicia, which ended up being the deadliest offensive by Montoneros. The assault was carried out on Sunday, October 5, 1975, during the term of a constitutional government.

== Aircraft ==
The aircraft, a Boeing 737-287C with registration LV-JNE and named "City of Trelew" (Spanish: Ciudad de Trelew) which had first flown in 1970, had already been hijacked on another occasion, when in October 1973 a group of Uruguayan citizens forced the pilots to fly to Bolivia. In addition to the hijackings, the plane also suffered numerous mechanical incidents, including a fire that rendered it unusable, and it became humorously known in the aviation community as "El Mufa". (Note: "Mufa" is an Argentinian term meaning "bad luck," so it is applied by saying that someone or something "has the mufa" or "is mufa" when their presence or involvement in any event is believed to bring misfortune if things go wrong.)

== Hijacking ==
=== Operation Primicia ===
The attempted seizure of the 29th Forest Infantry Regiment during the Dirty War resulted in 27 deaths, with 15 Montoneros guerrillas being killed along with 12 Argentine Army soldiers and 3 civilians. The military casualties, along with 2 civilian employees, were attacked while showering. The operation was considered a failure since the attackers only managed to seize 50 FN FAL assault rifles and one FAP. After the operation, the surviving guerrillas fled towards the airport, where another commando group had already hijacked the Aerolineas plane that came from Buenos Aires with 102 passengers on board, including four babies, and six crew members.

=== Flight 706 hijacking ===
Journalist Ceferino Reato, who reconstructed the events of the hijacking in his book Operación Primicia, recounts that when the aircraft was flying over the city of Monte Caseros, en route to Corrientes, a young man in his twenties burst into the cockpit with a 9mm Browning Hi-Power pistol and ordered Aircraft Commander Diego Bakas and co-pilot Amílcar Fernández to not move, saying that "The plane is taken by Montoneros." After forcing the pilot to divert to El Pucú Airport, in the city of Formosa—previously seized by another Montoneros platoon—the passengers were released and the plane took off towards Brazil. However, due to a lack of fuel, the aircraft had to make an emergency landing in a field in María Susana, near Rafaela, in the province of Santa Fe, close to the intersection of National Routes 34 and 19.

=== After landing ===
The Boeing 737 remained stranded on the swampy ground, with the landing gear partially buried. To be able to remove it, a metallic track from the Argentine Air Force measuring 600 meters long by 30 meters wide, made of a mesh of aluminium plates on a sand bed, was placed underneath it. In addition, all the seats and any non-essential items for the flight were removed, as well as loading it with a minimal amount of fuel to reduce the maximum take-off weight. Finally, after 16 days, the aircraft took off from Rafaela on October 21, heading to Sauce Viejo and from there to Buenos Aires, where maintenance was performed.
