= Argentina–Paraguay relations =

- Argentina: Paraguay

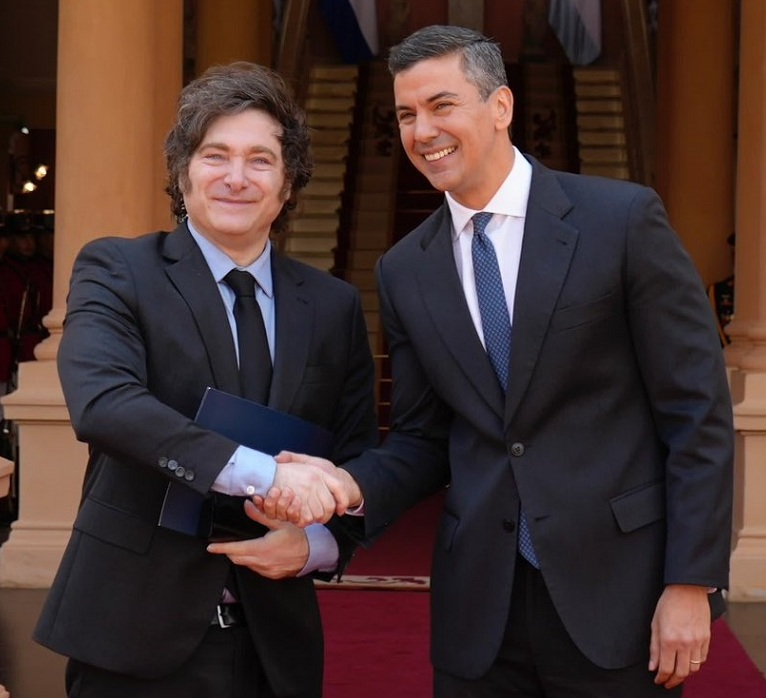
Presidents Javier Milei of Argentina and Santiago Peña of Paraguay respectively in April 2025.

Argentina–Paraguay relations are the historical and bilateral ties between the Argentine Republic and the Republic of Paraguay that have existed for more than two centuries. Diplomatic relations between those two neighbors were established in 1811 with the signing of an agreement on Friendship, Assistance and Trade. Both countries were at war between 1864 and 1870 (War of the Triple Alliance), but have not fought one another since, maintaining an overall friendly and collaborative relations between both countries.

Argentina has an embassy in Asunción and three consulates-general (in Asunción, Ciudad del Este and Encarnación). Paraguay has an embassy in Buenos Aires and seven consulates (in Clorinda, Corrientes, Formosa, Posadas, Resistencia, Rosario and Puerto Iguazú). Both countries are full members of Mercosur, Union of South American Nations, Organization of American States, Organization of Ibero-American States, Rio Group, Group of 77, Latin American Economic System and Latin American Integration Association.

Both States share the Argentina–Paraguay border.

== See also ==
- Foreign relations of Argentina
- Foreign relations of Paraguay
- Paraguayan War
- Paraguayan immigration to Argentina
