= José Falcón, Paraguay =

José Falcón
- District and town
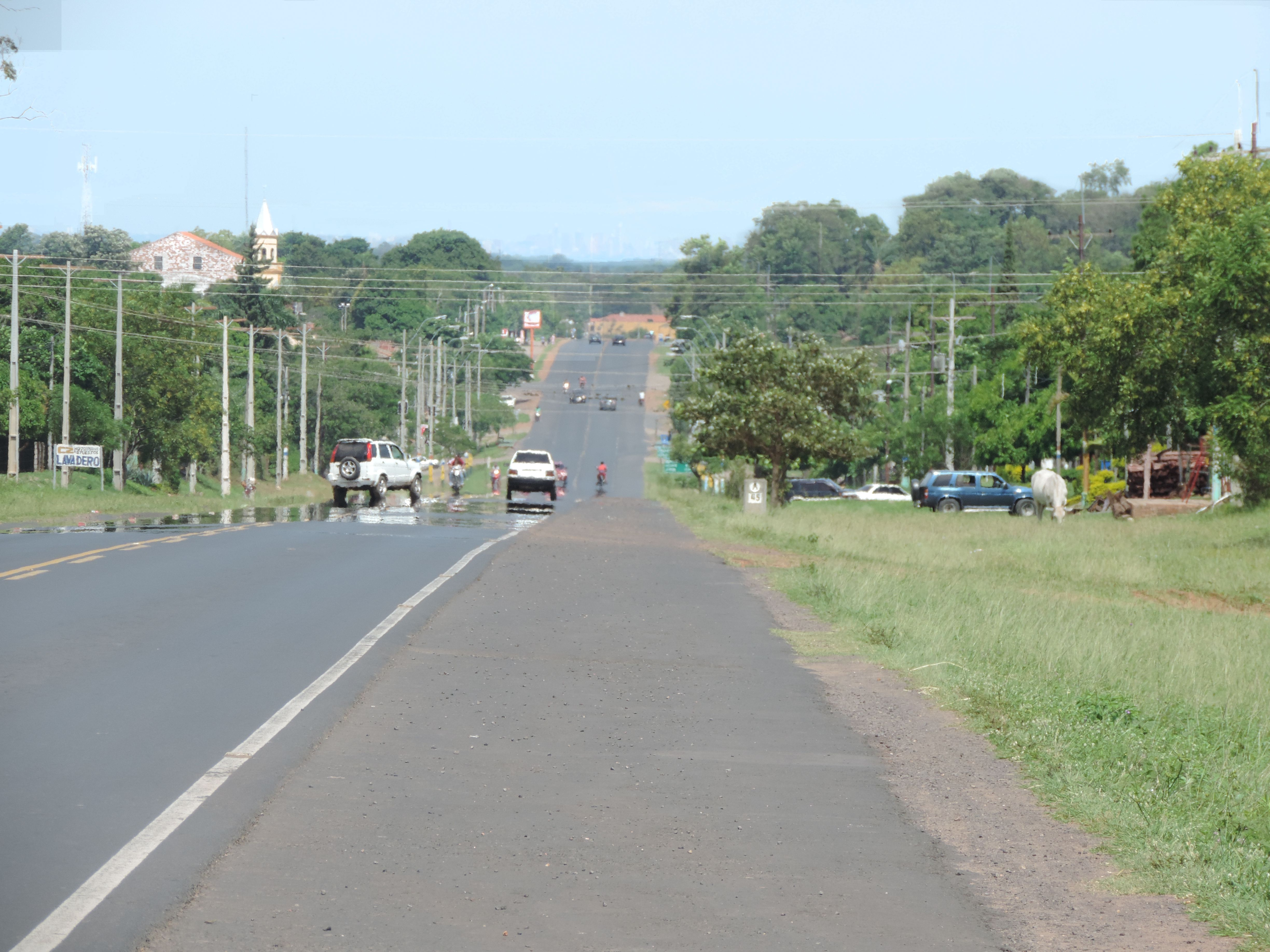
- Nearby José Falcón, the city of Asunción can be seen in the background, Paraguay.

- Flag Coat of arms

- Location within Paraguay
- Coordinates: 25°15′00″S 57°43′00″W
- Country: Paraguay
- Department: Presidente Hayes
- Founded: 1997

Area
  - Total: 1,919 km^{2} (741 sq mi)
- Elevation: 54 m (177 ft)

Population (2022)
  - Total: 3,693
  - Density: 1.924/km^{2} (4.984/sq mi)
- Time zone: UTC-04 (AST)
  - Summer (DST): UTC-04 (ADT)
- Area code: +595 499
- Climate: Cfa

José Falcón is a district in Presidente Hayes Department of Paraguay, located 48 km North of Asunción.

== Geography ==
José Falcón is located in the Western region of Paraguay, in the area of Paraguayan Chaco. The area of the municipality is 1,919 km^{2} Its physical appearance is part of the characteristics of the Chaco soil: lowland with abundant vegetation of palm trees. It is a coastal city located at the junction between the Pilcomayo and Paraguay rivers. This district is located in a lowland area with clay soil. With no meaningful elevations. The geography in general at this part of the department is characterized by being swampy, with palm trees and grasses. It is a region that is highly prone to flooding in the rainy seasons of the year.

=== Limits ===
Jose Falcon limits with:

- North: Here is located the vast territory of Chaco
- South: bordering the town of Chaco'i
- East: with the district of Villa Hayes and Paraguay River
- West: bordered by the city of Clorinda, Argentina and Pilcomayo River

=== Climate ===
The district is located in an area of very hot weather in summer. In Jose Falcon the temperature reaches 44 °C. In winter the temperature can sometimes reach 0 °C. The average annual temperature is 22 °C.

== Economy ==
This area is characterized by a high commercial and tourist exchange between Paraguay and Argentina. Its strategic location near the Argentina–Paraguay border, in the Greater Asunción Area, makes commercial traffic intense. The town of Puerto Falcon joins the Argentinian city of Clorinda by the San Ignacio de Loyola International Bridge, on Pilcomayo River. It is a strategic border trade, in the Department of President Hayes.

== History ==
By law in 1997 the municipality of Jose Falcon was created, as a detachment of the municipality of Villa Hayes. A group of residents organized in a Coordinator Pro municipality prompted the creation of the municipality. The area has economic and social infrastructure and a strategic position to enhance sustainable development and become a powerful pole of development.

== Tourism ==
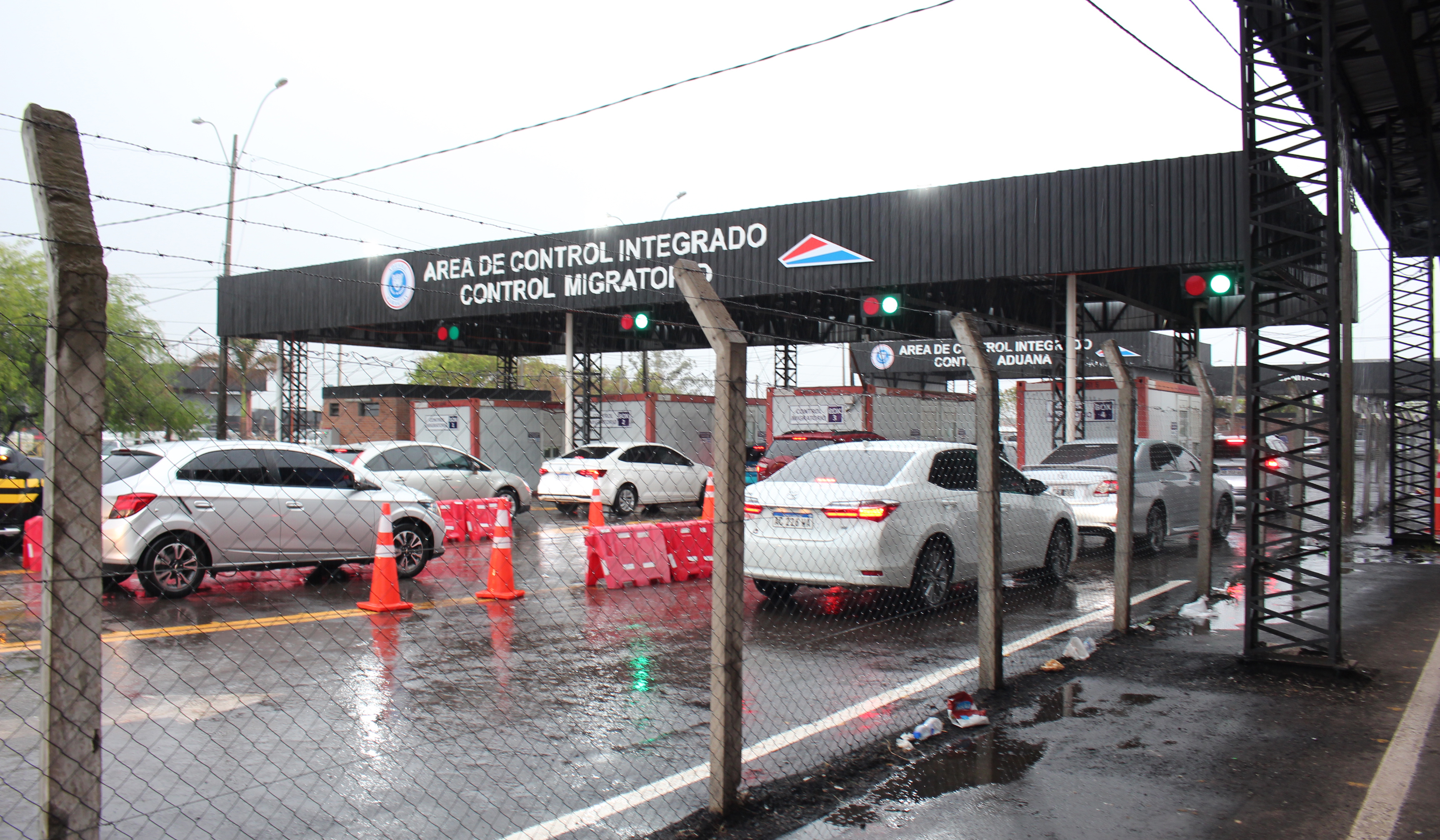
The Clorinda-José Falcón border checkpoint, Greater Asunción Area, Argentina–Paraguay border

The district has its own attractiveness of the Chaco region, which makes it an important tourist center, there is also an intense commercial traffic between Paraguay and Argentina which makes it an important source of resources.

The district can be reached by a detour of Route XII "Vice President Sanchez," is a detachment of the town of Villa Hayes.
