= National Route A011 (Argentina) =

Highway in Argentina

- Ruta nacional A011

Route information
- Length: 11 km (6.8 mi)

Major junctions
- NW end: National Route 3
- SE end: Puerto Pilcomayo

Location
- Country: Argentina

Highway system
- Highways in Argentina

National Route A011 is a road in the east of Formosa Province, Argentina. From the junction of National Route 3 on km marker 1,287 in Clorinda until the small village of Puerto Pilcomayo on the right bank of the Paraguay River, it runs for a length of 11 km (6.8 mi) all paved, numbered from km markers 1,287 to 1,298.

This road was part National Route 11 before, but due to the construction of the Puente internacional San Ignacio de Loyola it was renamed.

== Towns ==
The towns crossed on its length from NW to SE are the following:

- Clorinda (km 1287)
- Garcete Cué (km 1290)
- Puerto Pilcomayo (km 1298)
