= Anibal Argüello =

Paraguayan footballer

Anibal Vicente Argüello (born 7 December 1977) is a Paraguayan former footballer who played as a goalkeeper.

== Career ==
Argüello was born in Asunción, Paraguay.

=== Lower-tiers ===
In 2003, Argüello played for Atlántida Asunción. In the 2006 season at Sport Colombia, Argüello played with future national team midfielders Marcelo Estigarribia and Victor Ayala. In 2007, Argüello joined Fernando de la Mora. He remained at the club for the following season.

=== General Caballero ===
In 2009, Argüello shared the General Caballero ZC first-team list with midfielders Aldo Paniagua, Hugo Jazmin and Uranium Pereira.

For the 2010 season, Argüello shared the team with Brazilian midfielder Uranio Pereira and Japanese midfielder Junpei Shinmura. In 2010, he won the División Intermedia with General Caballero.

In the 2011 season, Argüello shared the goal keeping position at General Caballero ZC with Arístides Florentín. Argüello appeared in games during the 2011 Torneo Apertura and during the 2011 Torneo Clausura. All of his appearances in the Torneo Clausura came in September. In the 2011 Primera División Paraguaya season, Arguello amassed 13 appearances. He started in all of the 13 games played. He amassed 1 yellow card in 1, 170 minutes of game time.

On 29 January, he made his first appearance of the 2011 Primera División Paraguaya season in a 2–0 away victory against Libertad. On 12 February, Arguello goalkeeped in a 3–1 away defeat against Olimpia Asunción, receiving goals from Juan Carlos Ferreyra and Pablo Zeballos. On 28 April, Arguello played in a 3–1 home defeat against Nacional Asunción, receiving three first half goals from Ariel Bogado.

On 28 September 2011, Argüello made his last appearance for the 2011 season in a 4–2 defeat to Cerro Porteño.

=== Lower-tiers ===
In 2013, Argüello played for Resistencia Sport Club in the División Intermedia. In 2014, he played for Paranaense in the División Intermedia and was coached by Esteban Molinas. In 2015, Argüello again played for Resistencia.
