= SARF =

SARF or Sarf can refer to:

- Formosa International Airport, Argentina, from its ICAO code SARF
- RAF Search and Rescue Force, formerly providing maritime and mountain rescue services in the UK.
- Social Amplification of Risk Framework, a socio-psychological model of how the perception of risks is altered by cultural and social factors.
- Sarf, a village in western central Yemen.
