= Rondeau Boulevard =

Street in Rosario, Argentina

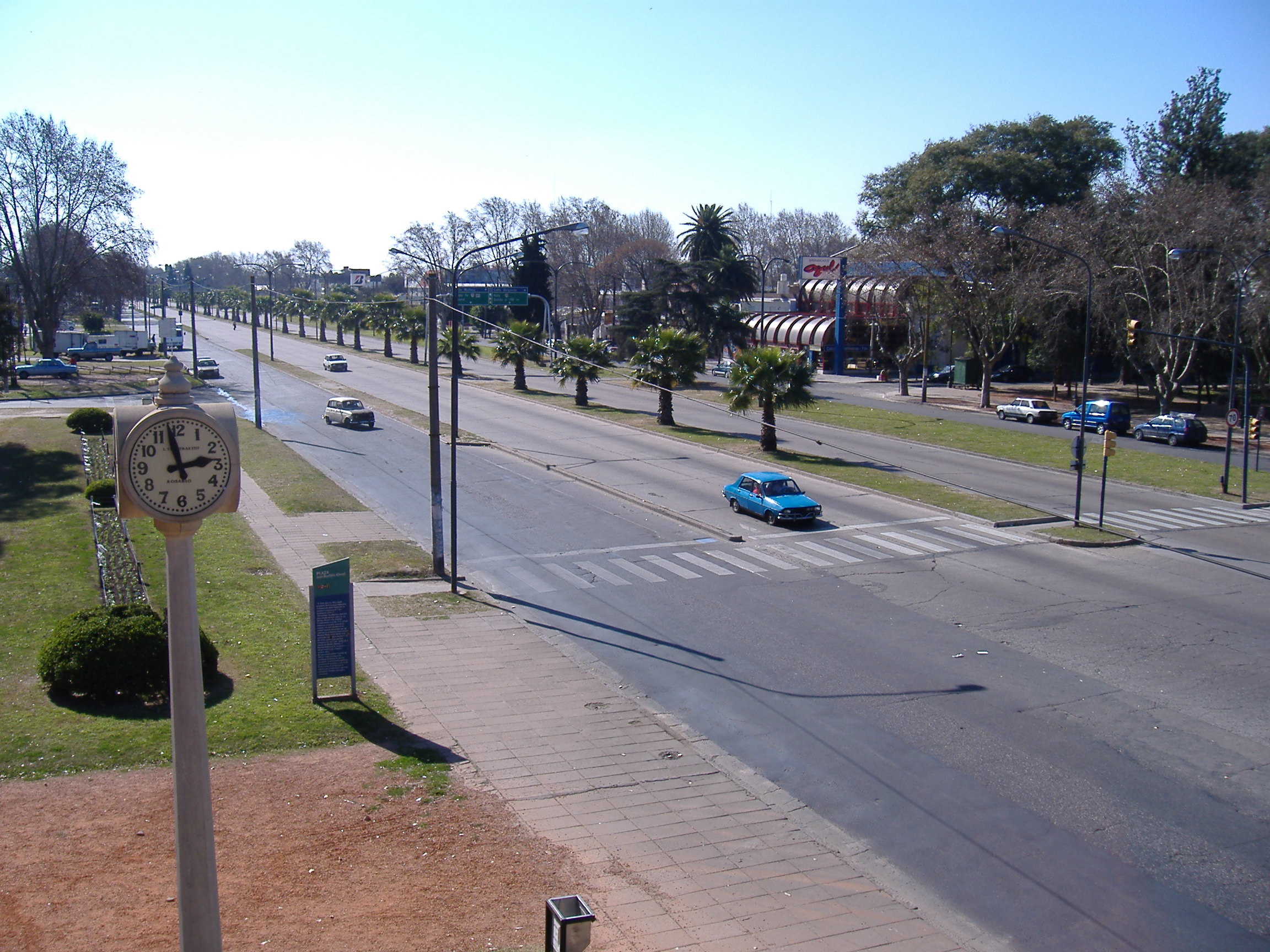
Rondeau Boulevard, facing north-northeast, from a pedestrian bridge

Rondeau Boulevard (full name in Spanish: Boulevard General José Rondeau) is a two-way, four-lane avenue and arterial road in Rosario, province of Santa Fe, Argentina. It starts as a continuation of Alberdi Avenue, in Barrio Lisandro de la Torre, and runs in a straight line, roughly parallel to the Paraná River, along the center of the northeastern block of the city, forming the western limit of Barrio Alberdi. It ends in the node formed by Beltway Avenue, the access to the Rosario-Victoria Bridge and the beginning of National Route 11, which marks the municipal border of Rosario with the city of Granadero Baigorria.

The boulevard is named after General José Rondeau (1773–1844), who fought in the Argentine War of Independence and was the first appointed Supreme Director of the United Provinces of the Río de la Plata.

Rondeau Blvd. follows a former railway of the Santa Fe Railway company, established in 1888, which had a stop in Pueblo Alberdi, a settlement which was later absorbed by Rosario. It was widened and turned into an arterial road during the administration of mayor Luis Cándido Carballo (1958–1959), following an extensive public works programme.

The boulevard starts at the junction of Alberdi Avenue, Portugal Avenue and Juan B. Justo St., marked by a bust of Lisandro de la Torre. At the end of the boulevard there is a statue of the Virgin of the Rosary, and a sign welcomes the visitors entering Rosario from the north.
