= Isla del Cerrito =

- Municipality and village
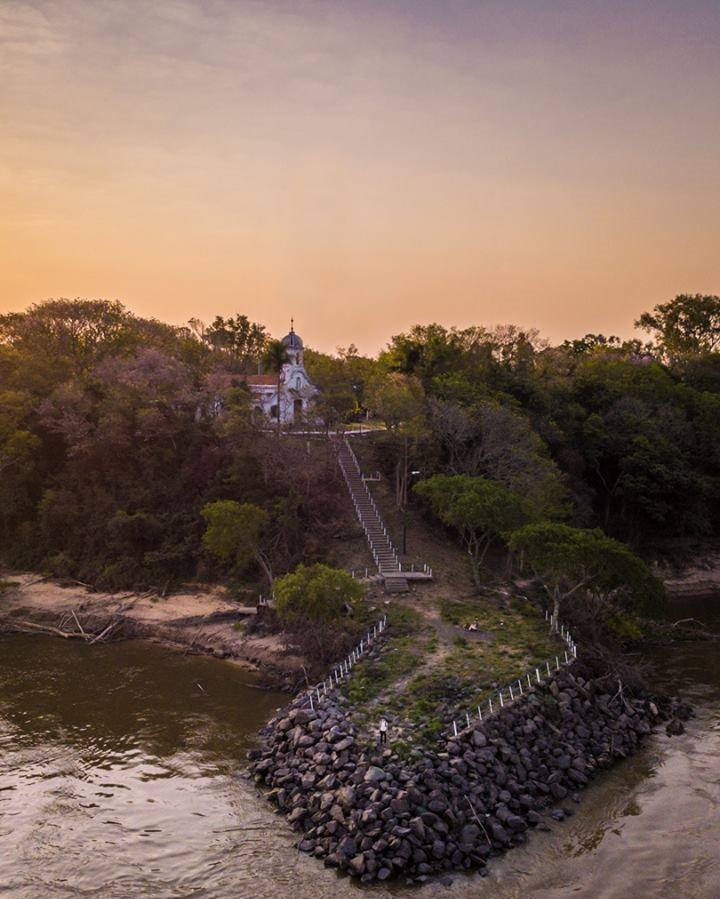
- Isla del Cerrito, Chaco, Argentina

- Location within Chaco Province Location within Argentina
- Coordinates: 27°17′43″S 58°37′10″W
- Country: Argentina
- Province: Chaco Province

Population (2001)
  - Total: 1,624
- Time zone: UTC−3 (ART)

Isla del Cerrito is a village and municipality of the Chaco Province in Northern Argentina, at the Argentina–Paraguay border
