= Argentina–Paraguay border =

International border

Coordinates: 22°14′S 62°39′W

The Argentina–Paraguay border is the line that limits the territories of Argentina and Paraguay. This boundary is solely defined by three major rivers: the Pilcomayo, Paraná and Paraguay, being one of the largest natural borders in the world. The capital of Paraguay, Asunción, lies on one of the banks of the Paraguay River, which borders Argentina. The capital of Argentina is Buenos Aires, which lies on one of the banks of the River Plate, made by major Paraguayan tributaries. Argentina is the country which Paraguay has the largest border with, being about 1,689 km long. It is Argentina's second largest border, after the Argentina–Chile border.

Some of the traditional Argentine-Paraguayan border checkpoints:

- Misión La Paz (South of Santa Victoria Este) - Pozo Hondo (North of Doctor P. Peña)
- Clorinda - Puerto Falcón
- Formosa - Alberdi
- Puerto Cano - Pilar
- Paso de la Patria - Paso de Patria
- Ituzaingó - Ayolas
- Posadas - Encarnación
- Puerto Iguazú - Presidente Franco

Isla del Cerrito is located at the confluence of the Paraguay and Paraná Rivers.

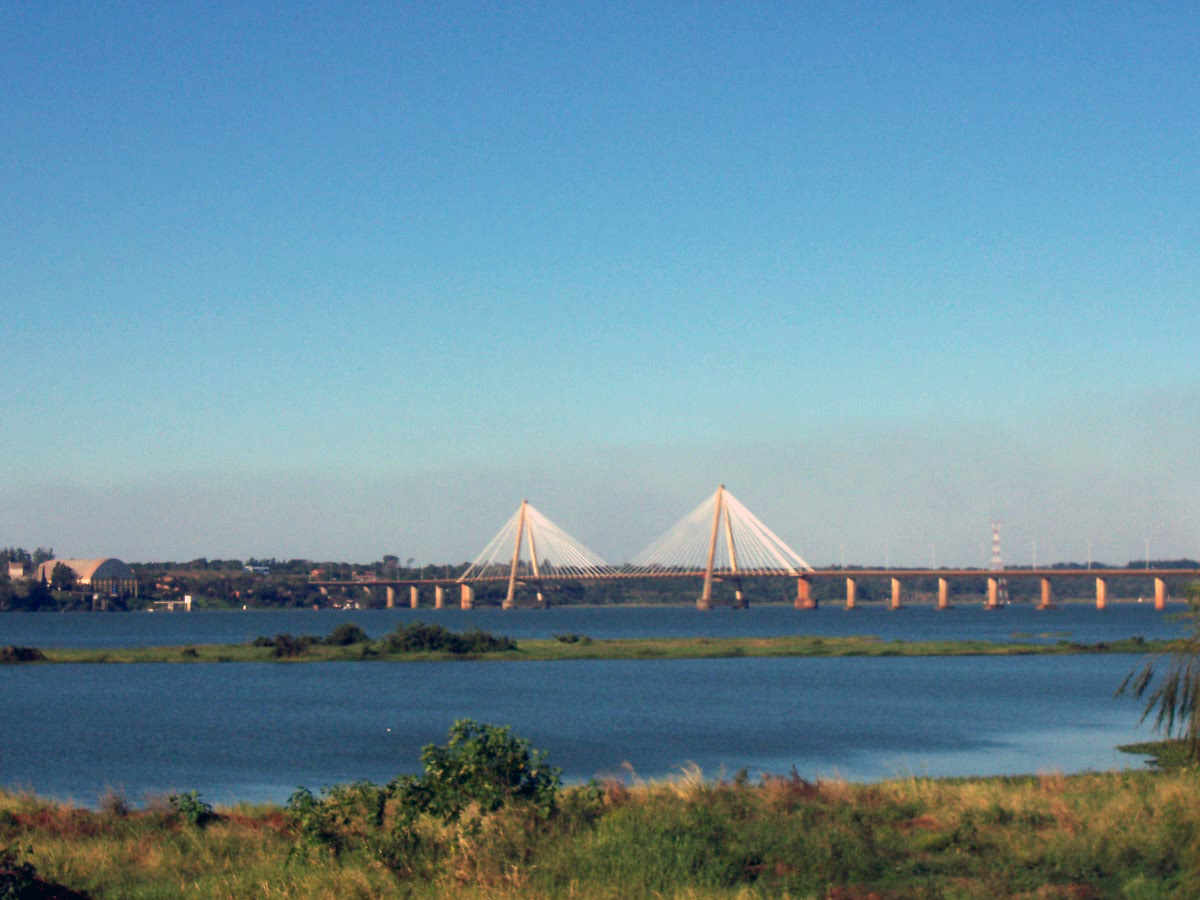
The San Roque González de Santa Cruz Bridge, Southern Paraguay and Northern Argentina.

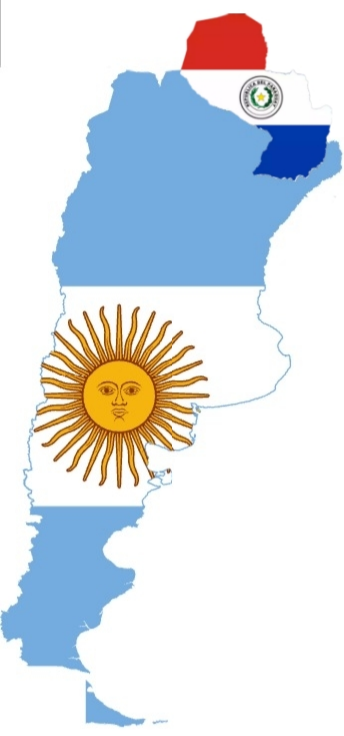
The maps of Argentina and Paraguay. Argentina borders 7 Paraguayan departments, plus the capital district. Paraguay borders 5 Argentine provinces.

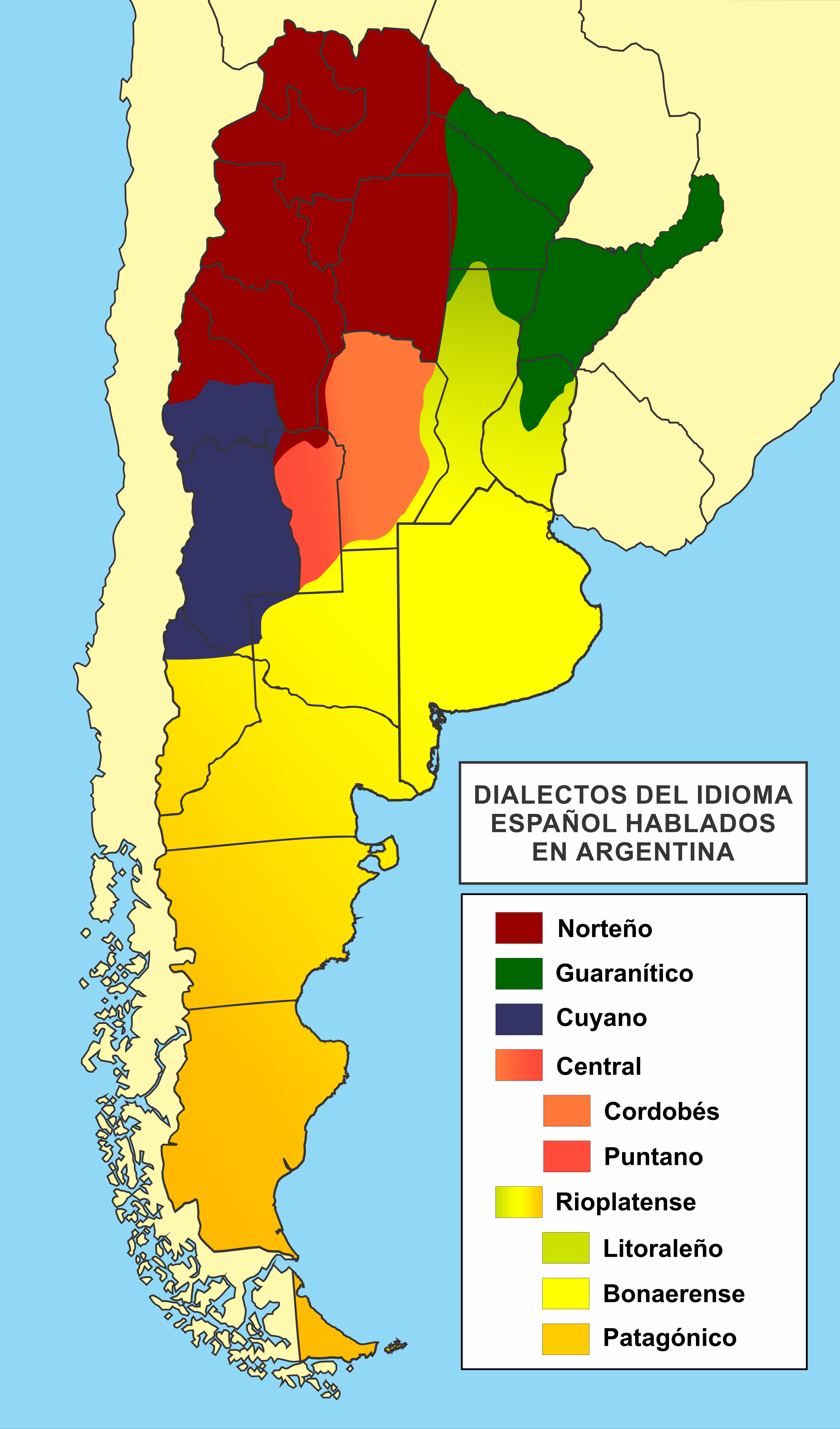
In Argentine Spanish, due to cultural reasons, the Northeastern Argentine dialect, named Guaranitic (green), is heavily influenced by the Paraguayan Spanish.

== See also ==
- Argentina national football team
- Argentina–Paraguay relations
- Culture of Argentina
- Culture of Paraguay
- Humid Chaco
- Isla Entre Ríos
- Paraguay national football team
- Paraguayan Argentines
- Argentine Paraguayans
