= National Route A012 (Argentina) =

Highway in Argentina

- Ruta nacional A012

Route information
- Length: 67 km (42 mi)

Major junctions
- N end: San Lorenzo
- S end: Pueblo Esther

Location
- Country: Argentina

Highway system
- Highways in Argentina

National Route A012 is a road in the southeast of Santa Fe Province, Argentina. It has a semi-circular length centered on the city of Rosario, running as a long-length beltway. From the National Route 9 junction on km marker 278, in the town of Pueblo Esther, to the junction with National Route 11 on km marker 326 in the city of San Lorenzo it runs for 67 km (41.6 mi) all paved.

This road is popularly known as the Second Rosario Beltway, as it border the metropolitan area of greater Rosario (the third biggest city in Argentina). The First Rosario Beltway is National Route A008, which surrounds the city center.

Through National Decree 1595 of 1979 this road changed to federal control. Previously this road was called Provincial Route 16.

== Route ==
The cities and villages through which this route passes, in a clockwise direction, are the following (villages with less than 5000 inhabitants are in italics):

Santa Fe Province

Route: 67 km (km 0-67).

- Rosario Departament: Piñero (km 15) and Zavalla (km 24).
- San Lorenzo Departament: Roldán (km 42), Ricardone (km 61) and San Lorenzo (km 66-67).
