= San Ignacio de Loyola International Bridge =

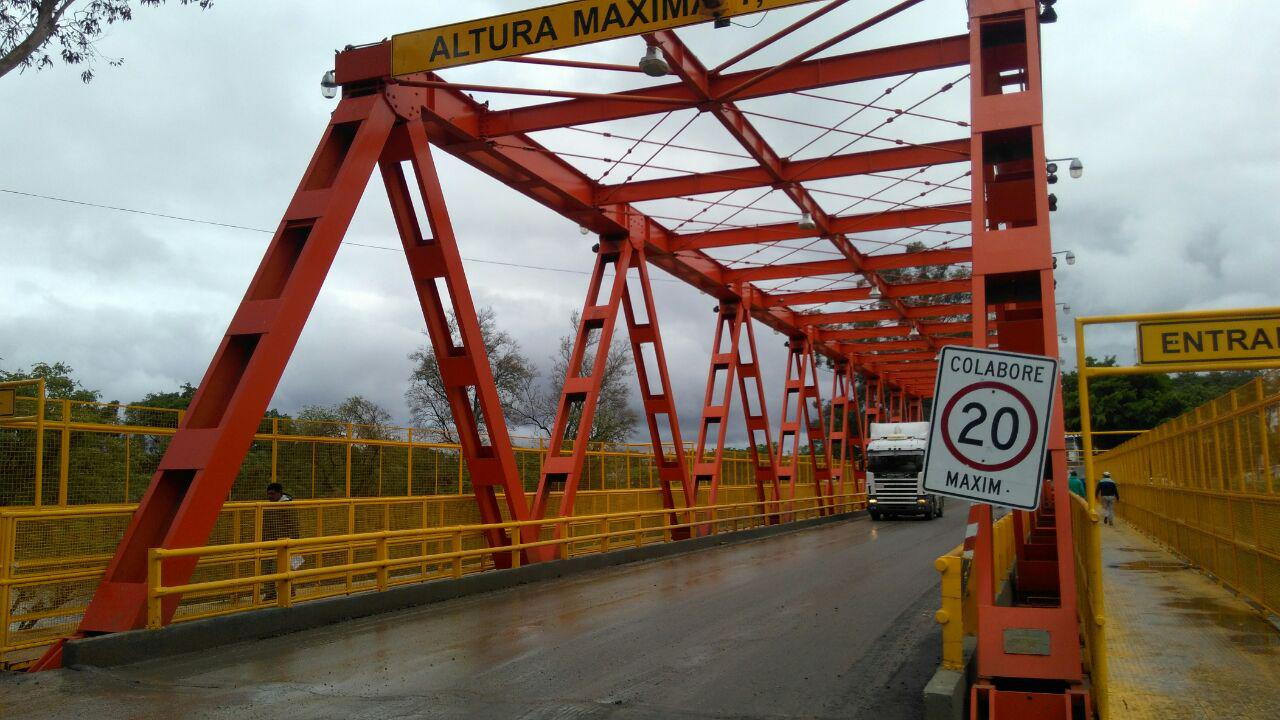
San Ignacio de Loyola International Bridge, right at the Argentina–Paraguay border, 2016.

The San Ignacio de Loyola International Bridge (Spanish: Puente Internacional San Ignacio de Loyola) is a road bridge that crosses the border between Argentina and Paraguay over the Pilcomayo River, from the Argentine city of Clorinda, to José Falcón, near Asunción, Paraguay's capital.

The bridge is 70 m long and 8 m wide, and marks the end of Argentine National Route 11, which goes 980 km from Rosario to Clorinda.

It is named after Ignatius of Loyola, founder of the Society of Jesus. The Jesuit order explored the area and established many missions which later became towns and cities (see Jesuit Reductions).

Due to the COVID-19 pandemic, border crossings between Argentina and Paraguay were open only for cargo shipping. On 13 December 2021, The San Ignacio de Loyola Bridge, as well as river crossings between Alberdi and Puerto Formosa reopened after two years of closure.
