= Pilcomayo Department =

Coordinates: 25°17′10″S 57°43′21″W

Pilcomayo Departamento Pilcomayo
- Department
- Interactive map of Pilcomayo
- Country: Argentina
- Seat: El Espinillo

Area
  - Total: 5,342 km^{2} (2,063 sq mi)

Population (2022)
  - Total: 94,383
  - Density: 17.67/km^{2} (45.76/sq mi)

Pilcomayo is a department in the Argentine province of Formosa. Its capital is Clorinda, the second most populous city in the province. Pilcomayo has a surface of 5,342 km^{2} and a population of 78,114 according to the 2001 census [INDEC]. Other communities in Pilcomayo include Laguna Blanca, Laguna Naick Neck, Riacho He-Hé and Siete Palmas. The Pilcomayo River National Park (Parque Nacional Río Pilcomayo) is about 45 kilometers west of Clorinda, crossed by the Pilcomayo River.
