= National Route 11 (Argentina) =

Highway in Argentina

National Route 11
- Ruta nacional 11
- National Route 11

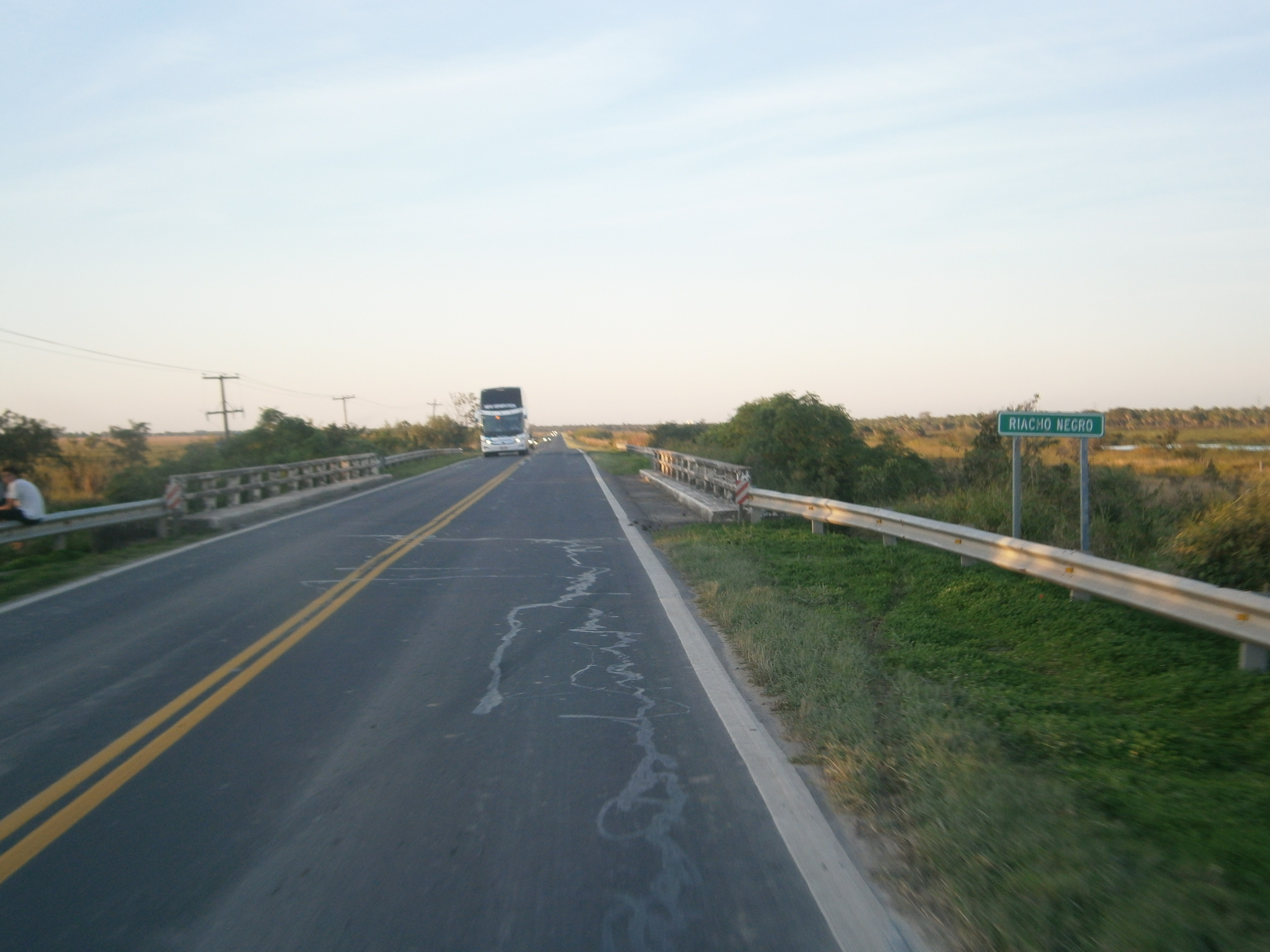
- RN 11 in the Province of Formosa.

Route information
- Length: 980 km (610 mi)

Major junctions
- South end: Rosario
- North end: San Ignacio de Loyola International Bridge

Location
- Country: Argentina

Highway system
- Highways in Argentina

National Route 11 (RN11), known officially as Carretera Juan de Garay, is a road in Argentina, which runs through the provinces of Santa Fe, Chaco, and Formosa. From its beginning in the Rosario Beltway until it ends at the San Ignacio de Loyola International Bridge, on the border with Paraguay, it covers 980 km (610 mi), fully paved. In Formosa Province, the 80 km (50 mi) highway is under construction between the intersection with National Route 81 to the north of the City of Formosa and the town of General Lucio V. Mansilla on the shores of the Bermejo River bordering the Chaco Province.

== Management ==
In 1990, the busiest routes in the country were concessioned with toll collections, dividing them into Road Corridors. In this way, the company Servicios Viales took over Road Corridor number 8, which includes Route 11 between km 326 and 1008, from the link with National Route A012 in San Lorenzo to the link with National Route 16 in Resistencia, installing tolls in Nelson (km 607), Reconquista (km 774) and Florencia (km 930). In 2003, the concession contracts for the Road Corridors expired, so the numbering of the road corridors was modified and a new tender was called.

Road Corridor number 3 was concessioned to the Road 3 company and included Route 11 from San Lorenzo (km 326) to Arroyo del Rey (km 790) near Reconquista, while the Road Concession Company (Emcovial) was in charge Road Corridor number 6 that includes Route 11 between the aforementioned stream and the junction with National Route 16 in Resistencia (km 1008). In April 2010 a new Cinco Vial concession was taken over and includes the section from km 326 to km 1008.

The 297 km (185 mi) stretch between the junction with National Route 16, in Resistencia, and the border with Paraguay has been located since 1995 in Road Corridor 28, under the concession system with private financing, that is, without tolls. The end date of the contract was in 2008.
