= Franco Llamas =

Argentine footballer (born 1990)

Franco Federico Llamas (born 4 January 1990 in Formosa) is an Argentinian football striker who plays for Los Cuervos del Fin del Mundo, based in Tierra del Fuego province.

== Career ==
He scored the first goal of the 2011–12 Copa Argentina.
