= Riacho He-Hé =

- Location within Argentina
- Coordinates: 25°21′38″S 58°16′49″W
- Country: Argentina
- Province: Formosa Province
- Department: Pilcomayo
- Time zone: UTC−3 (ART)
- Climate: Cfa

Riacho He-Hé is a settlement in northern Argentina. It is located in the Pilcomayo Department of Formosa Province.
