= Néstor Espínola =

Argentine footballer

Personal information
- Full name: Néstor Fabián Espínola
- Date of birth: 6 December 1985 (age 40)
- Place of birth: Formosa, Argentina
- Height: 1.79 m (5 ft 10 in)
- Position: Midfielder

Senior career*
Years	Team	Apps	(Gls)
2005	Gimnasia LP	0	(0)
2006	Sportivo Patria		
2006	Unión Sunchales		
2007	Sportivo Patria		
2007–2008	Unión Sunchales		
2008–2009	Gimnasia CdU	22	(2)
2009	Boca Unidos		
2010–2011	Patronato	54	(5)
2011–2012	Atlético Tucumán	20	(0)
2012	Cobresal	14	(0)
2013–2014	Gimnasia de Jujuy	19	(0)
2014	Curicó Unido	3	(0)
2015	San Jorge	12	(1)
2016–2018	Almagro	28	(0)
- * Club domestic league appearances and goals

Néstor Fabián Espínola (born 6 December 1985) is an Argentine former footballer who played as a midfielder.

== Career ==
Abroad, Espínola had stints with Chilean clubs Cobresal in 2012 and Curicó Unido in 2014 in the Primera División and the Primera B, respectively.

His last team was Club Almagro.

== Honours ==
Patronato

- Torneo Argentino A (1): 2009–10
