= Lucas Ojeda =

Argentine footballer

Personal information
- Full name: Lucas Ramón Ojeda Villanueva
- Date of birth: 1 February 1986 (age 40)
- Place of birth: Formosa, Argentina
- Height: 1.81 m (5 ft 11 in)
- Position: Striker

Youth career
- 2001–2004: Independiente

Senior career*
Years	Team	Apps	(Gls)
2005–2007	Independiente	4	(0)
2007	Tigre	0	(0)
2007	San Martín Tucumán	3	(0)
2008	Atlanta	18	(2)
2008–2009	Gimnasia CdU	28	(13)
2009	Rangers	14	(3)
2010	O'Higgins	32	(6)
2011	Deportes Iquique	27	(3)
2012	Rangers	20	(1)
2012	Rangers B	2	(2)
2013	Gimnasia CdU	13	(3)
2014–2015	Universitario de Sucre	18	(2)
2015	Magallanes	11	(1)
2016	Sol de América Formosa	–	(–)
2017–2018	Independiente Fontana	–	(–)
2019	Defensores de Formosa	–	(–)
2020	Independiente Fontana	–	(–)
2020	1.º de Mayo	1	(0)
2020–2021	8 de Diciembre	3	(0)
- * Club domestic league appearances and goals

Lucas Ramón Ojeda Villanueva (born 1 February 1986) is an Argentine former footballer who played as a striker.

== Teams ==
- (Argentina) Independiente 2005–2007
- (Argentina) Tigre 2007
- (Argentina) San Martín de Tucumán 2007
- (Argentina) Atlanta 2008
- (Argentina) Gimnasia y Esgrima de Concepción del Uruguay 2008–2009
- (Chile) Rangers 2009
- (Chile) O'Higgins 2010
- (Chile) Deportes Iquique 2011
- (Chile) Rangers 2012
- (Chile) Rangers B 2012
- (Argentina) Gimnasia y Esgrima de Concepción del Uruguay 2013
- (Bolivia) Universitario de Sucre 2014–2015
- (Chile) Magallanes 2015
- (Argentina) Sol de América de Formosa 2016
- (Argentina) Independiente de Fontana 2017–2018
- (Argentina) Defensores de Formosa 2019
- (Argentina) Independiente de Fontana 2020
- (Argentina) 1.º de Mayo 2020
- (Argentina) 8 de Diciembre 2020–2021

== Honours ==
San Martín de Tucumán

- Primera B Nacional: 2007–08

Universitario de Sucre

- Torneo Clausura: 2014
