= Aborigen Rugby Club =

Argentinian rugby union club, based in Formosa

(Argentina) Fundación Aborigen
- Full name: Fundación Aborigen Rugby Club
- Union: Argentine Rugby Union
- Founded: 1993; 33 years ago
- Region: Formosa Province
- League: Liga Formoseña de Rugby
Team kit

Fundación Aborigen Rugby Club is an Argentine rugby union club from the city of Formosa. The senior team currently plays in the Liga Formoseña of Formosa Rugby Union. The club has teams competing in three categories, including first division, U-18 and U-16, with 120 players registered. The club has also the particularity of being the first aborigin rugby union club in Latin America.

== History ==
The club was established in 1993 following an initiative of Eduardo Rossi, who had the idea of teaching the rules of the game to Toba aborigins of Formosa Province. Rossi, a rugby player himself and an admirer of Hitler and Mussolini, had played for Stade Toulousain in the 1980s although he had to leave the club due to his racist ideas. Several years later and after changing his mind about ethnic groups when visiting a Holocaust museum in France with his teammates, Rossi decided to spread the practise of the sport among Toba people of Formosa Province, who lived in conditions of extreme poverty.

He arrived to Formosa with the objective of establishing a rugby team and teaching local aborigins the rules of the game. The boys recruited by Rossi were minery and agricultural workers that trained barefoot two days a week and learnt how to play. They also used a truck instead of a scrumming machine in the practises due to the lack of resources.

At the beginning everything was strange to them (the aborigins) and that's why: they thought the rugby ball was a ñandú egg.

— Eduardo Rossi, founder of the club.

On March 30, 1993, Aborigen Rugby Club made its official debut v. local team Aguará. Two years later the club played a friendly match v the U-19 Rosario combined team. In 1996 Aborigen played more friendly games, some of them v Tierra del Fuego and Tucumán teams. In 1998 Aborigen made its international debut, touring on New Zealand where they played two matches against local teams (with one victory and the rest game lost).

The Aborigen Rugby Club became popular in 2004 with the documentary named "La Quimera de los Héroes" (translated to English as "The Chimera of Heroes"), directed by Daniel Rosenfeld and released in 2008. The film tells the life of Eduardo Rossi and the foundation of Fundación Aborigen and was awarded at Venice and Independent Film festival of Buenos Aires.
