= Hugo Jazmín =

Argentine footballer

Personal information
- Full name: Hugo Manuel Jazmín
- Date of birth: 4 April 1979 (age 47)
- Place of birth: Formosa, Argentina
- Height: 1.80 m (5 ft 11 in)
- Position: Defender

Youth career
- Defensores del Centenario

Senior career*
Years	Team	Apps	(Gls)
1999–2000	Defensores del Centenario	–	(–)
2000	Cerro Porteño	1	(0)
2001	Fontana	–	(–)
2002	Chacra 8	–	(–)
2002	El Porvenir	2	(0)
2003	Deportivo Recoleta		
2003	Huracán	3	(0)
2004–2006	Sportivo Patria	25	(1)
2007	3 de Febrero	13	(1)
2007–2009	Sol de América Formosa	55	(1)
2009	General Caballero ZC		
2010	Lota Schwager	12	(0)
2011–2012	Sportivo Patria	38	(4)
2012–2013	Sol de América Formosa	(total)	(↑)
2013–2014	Independiente Fontana	13	(0)
2014–2015	Libertad del Eva Perón	–	(–)
2015	San Martín Formosa	8	(0)

Managerial career
- Independiente Fontana (youth)
- 2019–2020: Sol de América Formosa
- Libertad del Eva Perón (youth)
- 2022: Libertad del Eva Perón
- 2022–2023: Sol de América Formosa
- 2024: Libertad del Eva Perón
- 2024–2025: Unión Norte (youth)
- 2025: San Martín Formosa
- 2025: Inter Barrio Obrero
- * Club domestic league appearances and goals

Hugo Manuel Jazmín (born 7 September 1979) is an Argentine former footballer who played as a defender.

== Teams ==
=== Player ===
- (Argentina) Defensores del Centenario 1999–2000
- (Paraguay) Cerro Porteño 2000
- (Argentina) Fontana 2001
- (Argentina) Chacra 8 2002
- (Argentina) El Porvenir 2002
- (Paraguay) Deportivo Recoleta 2003
- (Argentina) Huracán 2003
- (Argentina) Sportivo Patria 2004–2006
- (Paraguay) 3 de Febrero 2007
- (Argentina) Sol de América de Formosa 2007–2009
- (Paraguay) General Caballero ZC 2009
- (Chile) Lota Schwager 2010
- (Argentina) Sportivo Patria 2011–2012
- (Argentina) Sol de América de Formosa 2012–2013
- (Argentina) Independiente de Fontana 2013–2014
- (Argentina) Libertad del Eva Perón 2014–2015
- (Argentina) San Martín de Formosa 2015

=== Coach ===
- (Argentina) Independiente de Fontana (youth)
- (Argentina) Sol de América de Formosa 2019–2020
- (Argentina) Libertad del Eva Perón (youth)
- (Argentina) Libertad del Eva Perón 2022
- (Argentina) Sol de América de Formosa 2022–2023
- (Argentina) Libertad del Eva Perón 2024
- (Argentina) Unión Norte (youth) 2024–2025
- (Argentina) San Martín de Formosa 2025
- (Argentina) Inter de Barrio Obrero 2025
