= Formosa International Airport =

Airport in Argentina

Formosa International Airport Aeropuerto El Pucú
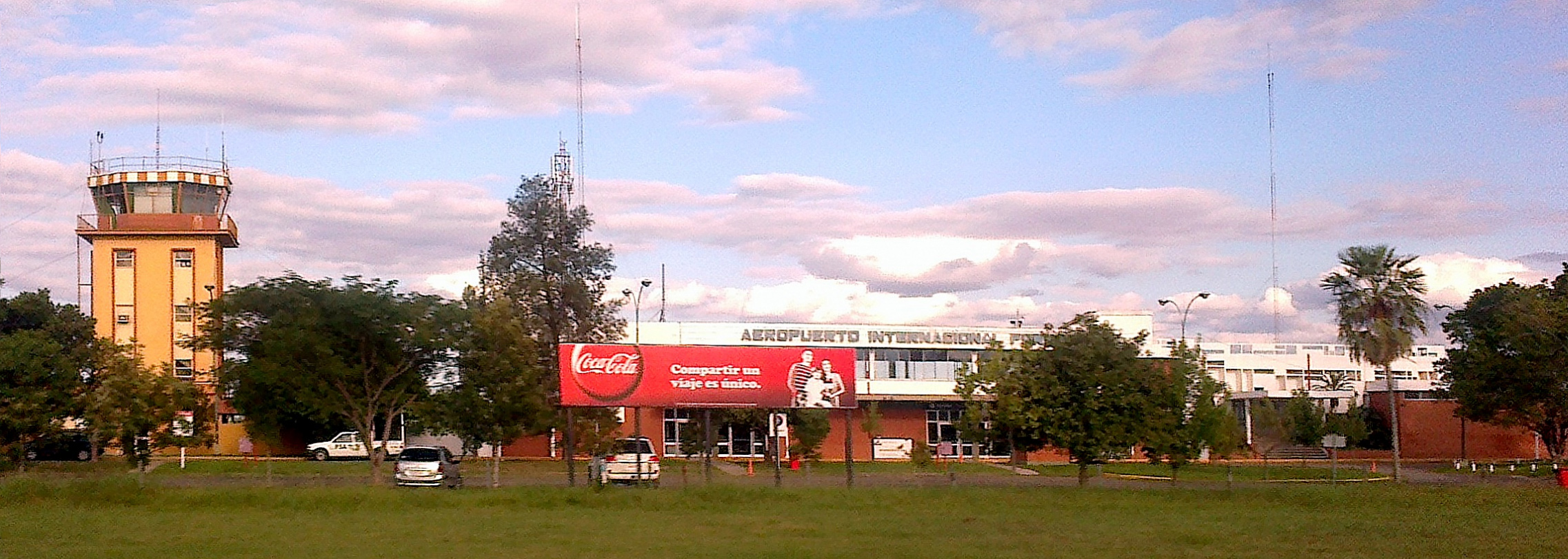
- IATA: FMA; ICAO: SARF

Summary
- Airport type: Public
- Owner/Operator: Aeropuertos Argentina 2000
- Serves: Formosa, Argentina
- Elevation AMSL: 193 ft (59 m)
- Coordinates: 26°12′45″S 58°13′40″W

Map
- Location of airport in Argentina

Runways
Direction	Length		Surface
Direction	m	ft	Surface
04/22	1,800	5,906	Asphalt

Statistics (2017)
- Passengers: 106,450
- Passenger change 16–17: ▲10.03%
- Aircraft movements: 2,064
- Movements change 16–17: ▲17.37%
- 2010 World Airport Traffic Report. SkyVector

Formosa International Airport (IATA: FMA, ICAO: SARF), also known as El Pucú Airport, is an international airport serving Formosa, Argentina, a city on the Paraguay River, which is locally the border between Argentina and Paraguay. The airport is operated by Aeropuertos Argentina 2000.

The airport is located on the southwest side of the city, and is 7 kilometres (4 mi) west of the international border.

== Airlines and destinations ==
Airlines	Destinations
Aerolíneas Argentinas	Buenos Aires–Aeroparque

== See also ==
- Transport in Argentina
- List of airports in Argentina
