= National Route A008 (Argentina) =

Highway in Argentina

- Ruta nacional A008
- Avenida de Circunvalación 25 de Mayo

Route information
- Length: 30 km (19 mi)

Major junctions
- Beltway around Rosario

Location
- Country: Argentina

Highway system
- Highways in Argentina

National Route A008 is a 30 km (18.6 mi) beltway highway for the city of Rosario, Argentina. The road allows drivers to bypass the congested city center.

In its 30 km (19 mi) length, it intersects with National Route 9, National Route 3, National Route 34, National Route 11 and National Route 174.

The official numbering system denotes this road as "A008" but this denomination is mostly unknown by the locals as it is still called "Avenida de Circunvalación 25 de Mayo" ("25 of May Beltway Avenue") commemorating the May Revolution of 1810. Some sections are named after different personalities by local decree. For example:

- the section from the east end on 27 Boulevard to the crossing of Ayacucho Street (old exit to the Rosario-Buenos Aires Road, now access to Provincial Route 21), is called "National Route A008 Tte. General Juan Carlos Sánchez" by decree #232 of 14 May 1981.
- the section between Eva Perón Street and the exit to Santa Fe (the province capital) on the intersection with Rondeau Boulevard is called "National Route A008 Dr. Constantino Razzetti" by law #25769 of 1 September 2003.
