= Clorinda, Formosa =

Clorinda
- City
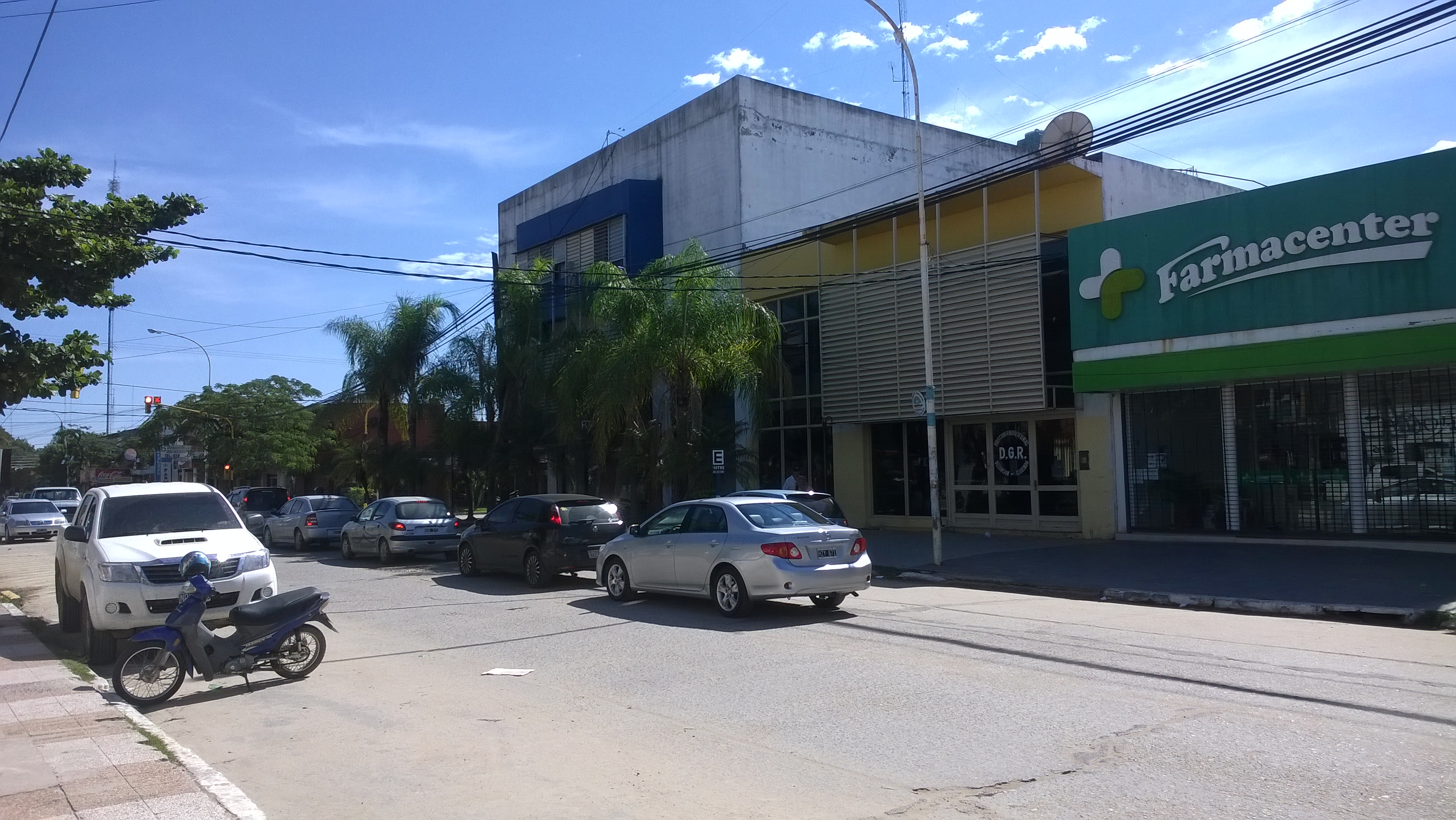
- Clorinda, Argentina

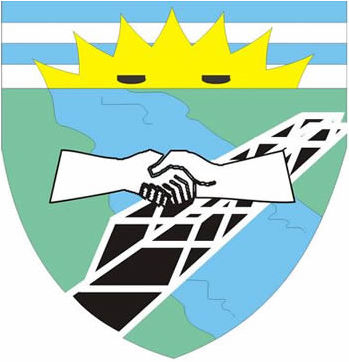
- Coat of arms

- Location of Clorinda in Argentina
- Coordinates: 25°17′S 57°43′W
- Country: Argentina
- Province: Formosa
- Department: Pilcomayo
- Founded: 1899

Government
  - Intendant: Ariel Caniza (Justicialist Party)
- Elevation: 60 m (200 ft)

Population (2022 census)
  - Total: 94,383
- Time zone: UTC−3 (ART)
- CPA base: P3610
- Dialing code: +54 3718
- Climate: Cfa
- Website: Official website

Clorinda is a city located in the province of Formosa, Argentina and the capital of the Pilcomayo Department. Located on the right bank of the Pilcomayo River, it sits at a strategic international crossroads just 4 kilometers from the Paraguayan capital of Asunción and 118 kilometers from the city of Formosa. Founded on September 29, 1899, on land originally granted to the Hertelendy family, the city has grown with a population of 94,383 as of the 2022 census. It serves as a major gateway between Argentina and Paraguay, connected internationally by the San Ignacio de Loyola Bridge and the pedestrian Friendship Footbridge.

== Geography ==
The city is the capital of the Pilcomayo Department. It is located on the right bank of the Pilcomayo River, just 4 kilometers from Asunción and 118 kilometers from Formosa. According to the 2022 INDEC census, Clorinda's population reached 94,383 inhabitants, representing a 16.4% growth from 2010, making it the second most populous city in Formosa Province and ranking 66th across Argentina.

== History ==
Hertelendy family acquired the land through a special government concession in 1895. The name "Clorinda" was chosen to honor Clorinda Pietanera de Bossi, a relative who cared for Manfredi de Hertelendy during his youth. The city was founded on 29 September 1899.

== Transport ==
The city is served by Clorinda Airport, which, as of 2021, has commercial airline service. The nearest commercial airport is Silvio Pettirossi International Airport in Asunción with nine passenger and two cargo airlines serving it. There's also the Clorinda Bus Terminal Station that offers services to other Northern Argentine destinations, through the National Route 12

It is connected to José Falcón via the San Ignacio de Loyola International Bridge. A secondary pedestrian crossing, known as the Friendship footbridge, connects the Nanawa.

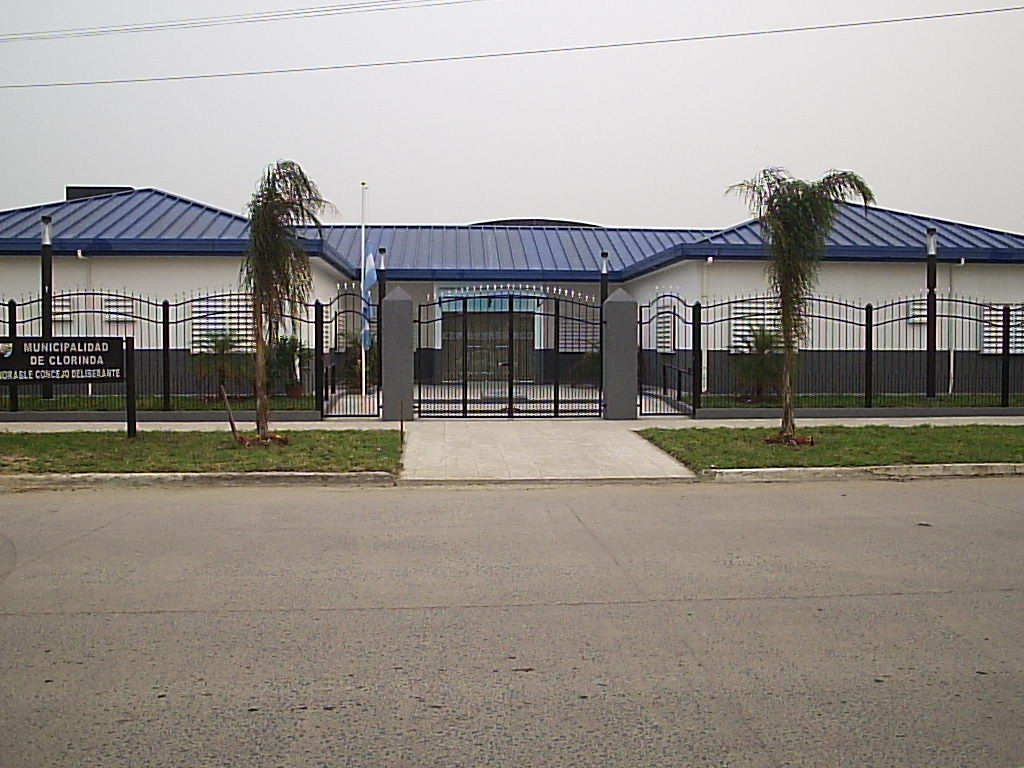
Clorinda City Council.

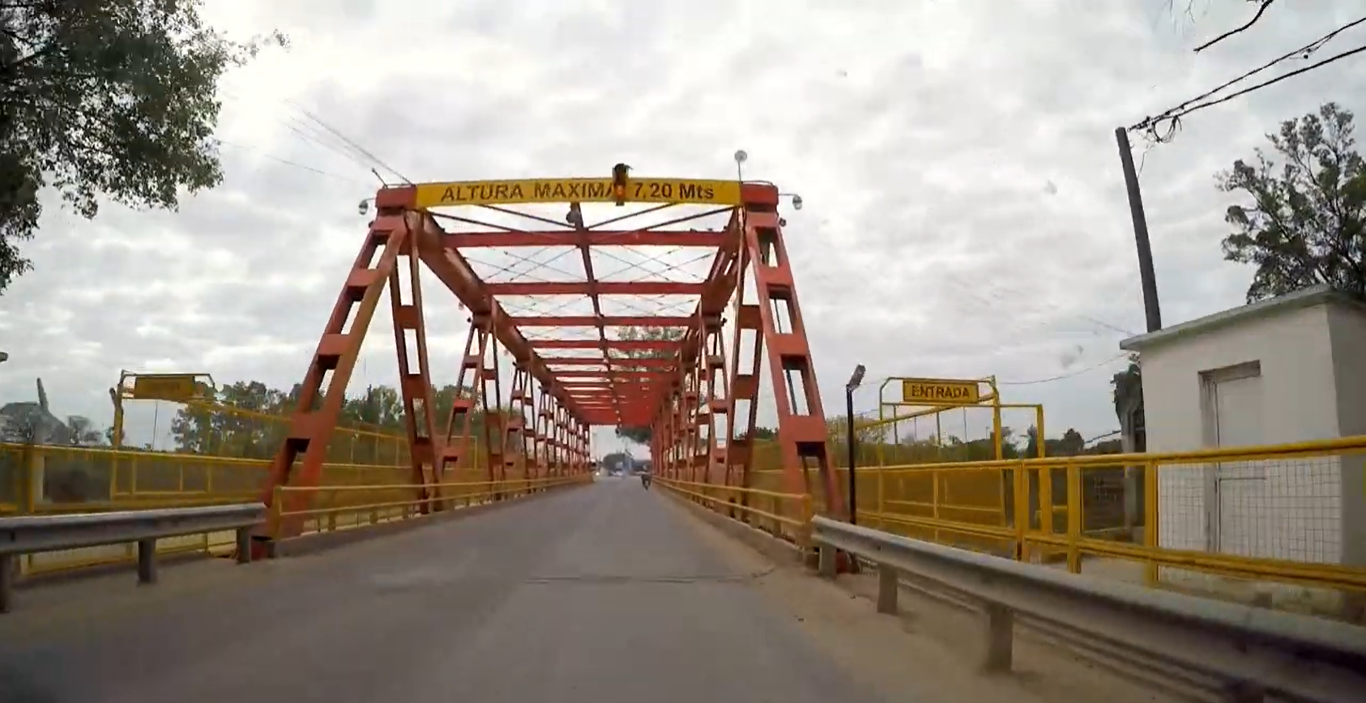
The San Ignacio de Loyola International Bridge, depicted at the city's coat of arms, Argentina–Paraguay border.

== Notable people ==
- José Mayans, politician and national senator
- Charo Bogarín, musician and actress
- Carlos Soto, footballer
