= Formosa, Argentina =

Formosa
- City
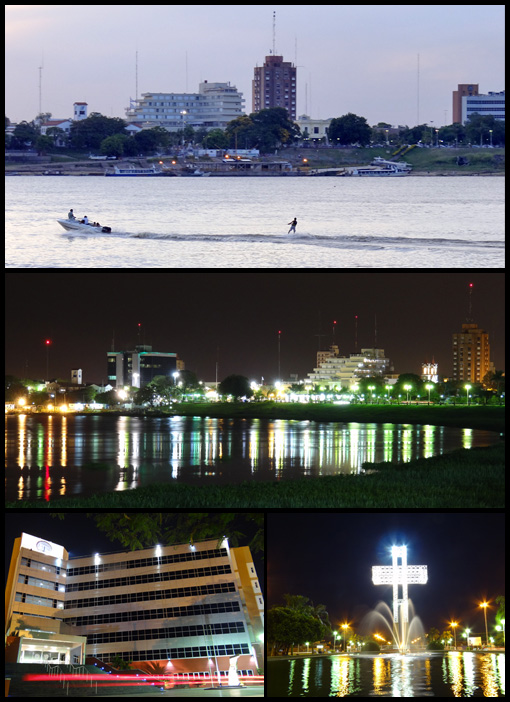
- Collage of Formosa

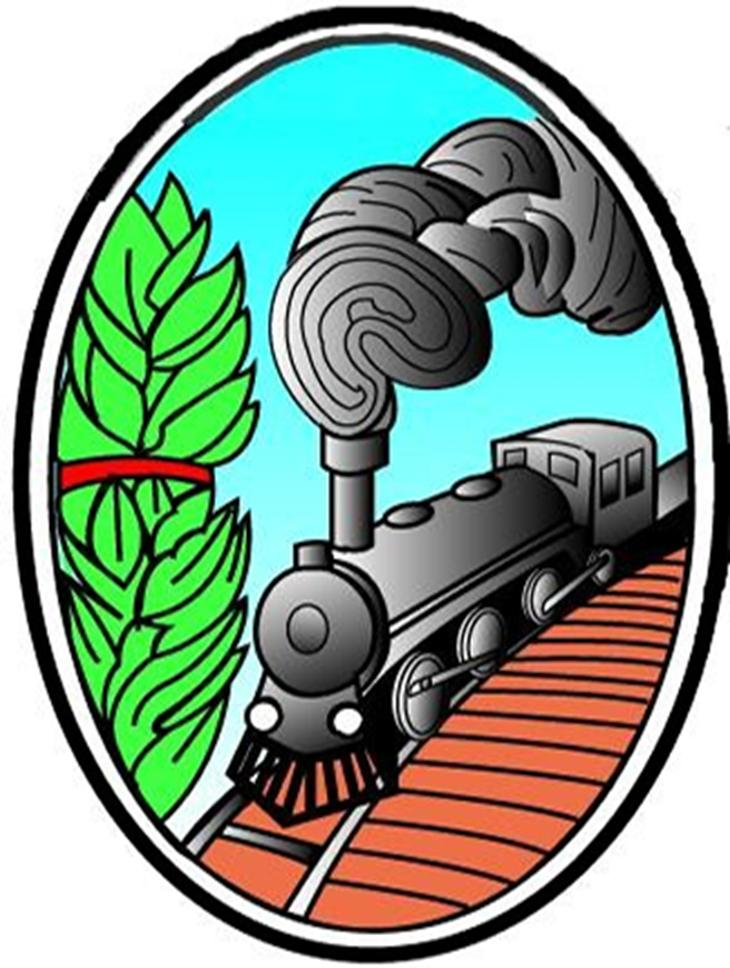
- Flag Coat of arms

- Location of Formosa in Argentina
- Coordinates: 26°11′S 58°11′W
- Country: Argentina
- Province: Formosa
- Department: Formosa
- Founded: April 8, 1879
- Founder: Luis Jorge Fontana

Government
  - Intendant: Jorge Jofré (FpV)

Area
  - City: 75 km^{2} (29 sq mi)
- Elevation: 57 m (187 ft)

Population (2010 census)
  - Estimate (2022): 276,309
  - Urban: 234,000
- Demonym: formoseño
- Time zone: UTC−3 (ART)
- CPA base: P3600
- Dialing code: +54 370
- Climate: Cfa
- Website: Official website

Formosa (Spanish pronunciation: [foɾˈmosa]) is the capital city of the Argentine province of Formosa, on the banks of the Paraguay River, opposite the Paraguayan town of Alberdi, about 1,200 km (746 mi) north from Buenos Aires, on National Route 11. The city has a population of about 234,000 per the 2010 census [INDEC].

Formosa is the hub of the provincial industry, that processes the product of its natural resources. The port that serves Paraguay towards the Paraná River is the main transport means for the provincial production.

Notable sights of the city include the Nuestra Señora del Carmen Cathedral, the Government House, the Torelli Botanic Forest Garden, the Provincial History Museum (Museo Histórico Provincial), the Estadio Centenario ("Centenary Stadium") football stadium, the Guaicole fauna reserve, the shore of the Paraguay River, the Isla de Oro Island, and the Central Square named after José de San Martín.

== History ==
The lands were initially inhabited by the Toba and Wichí (Mataco) indigenous peoples. On April 8, 1879 Commander Luis Jorge Fontana founded the settlement that would become the capital of the National Territory of Chaco from 1884 to June 15, 1955, when it gained the status of province. The Formosa campus of the National University of the Northeast was established as the National University of Formosa in 1988.

The name of the city (and the province) comes from the archaic Spanish word fermosa (currently hermosa) meaning "beautiful". The name Vuelta Fermosa or Vuelta la Formosa was used by Spanish sailors in the 16th century to describe the area where the Paraguay River makes a turn, right in front of the actual city. These sailors were searching for the legendary Sierra de la Plata.

== Government and politics ==
The city of Formosa is governed by the Municipal Council, which has autonomous status. It consists of an Executive Department (led by the Mayor), a Legislative Department (the Deliberative Council), and a Judicial Department (headed by the Municipal Chamber of Appeals and the misdemeanor judges distributed in the two Misdemeanor Courts of the city).

The Deliberative Council of Formosa has the highest number of members in the entire province, as it is the only municipality that currently has over 100,000 inhabitants in the province. There are a total of twelve councilors. The Council is headed by the President of the Council, followed by the 1st Vice President and the 2nd Vice President of the Council.

The Executive Department is led by the Mayor of the city of Formosa, who determines the members of the municipal cabinet. Within the cabinet, the Secretaries are responsible for endorsing the acts of the Mayor within their competence. Each Municipal Secretary is in charge of a specific area of the Executive Department. These secretaries, in turn, have sub-secretariats under their authority, which handle more specific competencies. Generally, the Sub-secretariats, such as the Traffic and Transportation sub-secretariat, are further divided into General Directorates, which are composed of Directorates and Departments.

== Culture ==
The city, which is only a few hundred meters away from Paraguay across the river, has a culture closer to that of Paraguay than the "porteño" culture of Buenos Aires. Laid back and relaxed, its young people relax on the Costanera, the recently restored pathway along the Río Paraguay which serves as a venue for arts displays and features a fast-food restaurant, or at boliches, local clubs. The city's well-known cultural institutions include the Formosa Regional Historical Museum, the Juan Pablo Duffard Historical Museum (a National Historic Monument), the Qomp Toba Artisanal Museum, and the Oscar Albertazzi Arts Institute.

The city has, since the 1970s, enjoyed increasing domestic tourism as a winter destination and, since the devaluation of the peso in 2002, growing international tourism, as well. Formosa is currently home to one five-star hotel (the International Tourist Hotel) and four four-star hotels. One other five-star establishment, the Howard Johnson Neo Formosa, was completed in July 2011 and features a casino and shopping gallery. 23,000-capacity Estadio Don Carlos Antonio Romero, used mainly for association football, is the main venue in Formosa.

=== Festivals ===
Formosa celebrates Our Lady of Carmen (Nuestra Señora del Carmen), its patron saint, on July 16 in honor of its holy day. Celebrations, which occur in the main Plaza San Martín, include the traditional pericón dance and stalls selling everything from food to balloons.

It also celebrates the Fiesta del Río in November, Carnaval on weekends in February and Día de la Fundación de Formosa in April.

== Transport ==
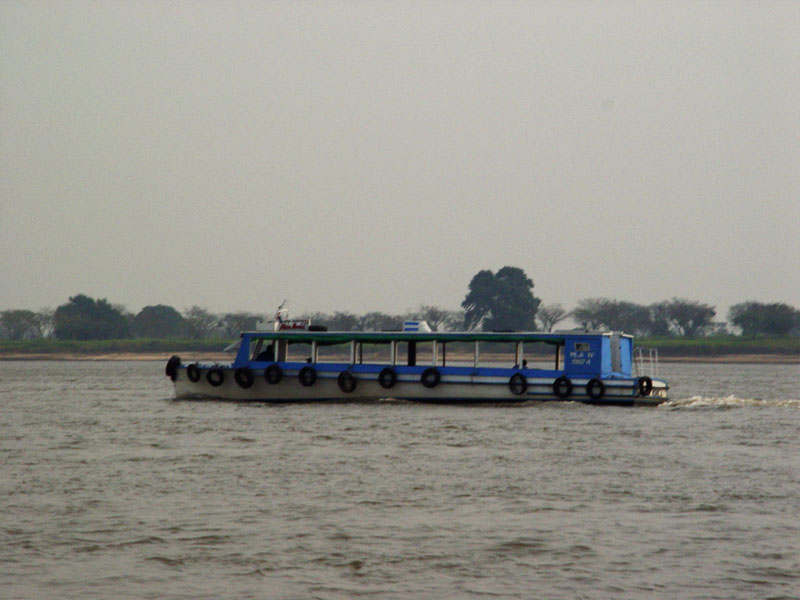
River transport between Formosa and Alberdi, Paraguay.

Located in the Argentine Littoral, Formosa is well connected to the rest of the country, the most used ways to go to and from Formosa, are through:

- The Formosa Bus Terminal Station, which goes to medium and long distances, with great passenger movement throughout the year. Several national and international transport companies operate in the city, whose most common destinations are Buenos Aires, Rosario, Corrientes, Resistencia, Córdoba, Mendoza, Posadas, Salta and Clorinda-Asunción.
- The El Pucú Airport (IATA: FMA, ICAO: SARF), 7 kilometres south of the city, serves charter flights, and regular flights to Buenos Aires.
- The Port of Formosa, with boat services to and from Alberdi, Paraguay.

The General Belgrano Railway, which is currently not in operation. In the branch near the port, its tracks were dismantled and the building where the station was located was converted into a museum, while the sheds of its mechanical workshops were converted into a large fair.

- The Public and Semi-public Transportation of Passengers: the city of Formosa has modern transportation units, reaching international standards, also providing the user with air conditioning and wifi while traveling; There are also taxi and remiss agencies.

From Buenos Aires, the highways to take are the: National Route A011, National Route 86 and National Route 12.

== Geography ==
=== Climate ===
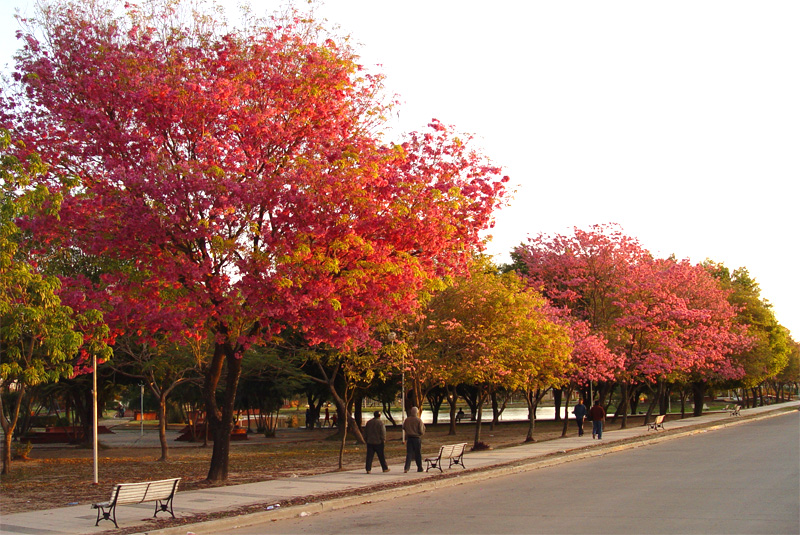
Lapachos in bloom at the Children's Paradise Park

The city has a climate considered as humid subtropical or Cfa by Köppen classification. The city's climate is among the hottest and most humid in Argentina: Winters are generally mild, air frosts are very uncommon. Summers are hot and humid. During the most extreme heat waves, temperatures exceed 40 °C or 104 °F. Temperatures have exceeded 35 °C (95 °F) in every season.

Summers are long, hot and sticky, with most days between 30 and 35 °C (86 and 95 °F); temperatures up to 38 °C (100.4 °F) are common, and nights are usually between 20 and 25 °C or 68 and 77 °F. Cooler temperatures only arrive by late April, and winters are warm: highs average 22 °C or 71.6 °F, lows average 12 °C or 54 °F. However, these averages are reached through a pattern that switches from hot, northerly winds, to cold southerly winds, and so forth: with northerly winds, temperatures are often much hotter, between 25 and 30 °C (77 and 86 °F) and nights are mild, around 15 °C or 59 °F. Southerly winds often bring a period of drizzly, cold weather with temperatures that stay around 10 to 15 °C (50 to 59 °F) for a day or two (which, combined with the high humidity and the winds can feel surprisingly cold), followed by clear skies, cold nights (2 to 7 °C or 36 to 45 °F) and pleasant days at 15 to 20 °C (59 to 68 °F). Light frost is possible in Formosa, especially in the outskirts of the city further away from the river; however, air temperatures seldom fall below 0 °C or 32 °F, every few years at most, with a record low of −2 °C or 28.4 °F. The highest temperature recorded was 43.7 °C or 110.7 °F on October 17, 2014 while the lowest temperature recorded was −2.5 °C or 27.5 °F on July 29, 2021.

Rainfall can be expected throughout the year though summer is usually the wettest season. Thunderstorms can be intense with frequent lightning, powerful gusts of wind and intense precipitation.

Climate data for Formosa International Airport (1991–2020, extremes 1963–present)
Month	Jan	Feb	Mar	Apr	May	Jun	Jul	Aug	Sep	Oct	Nov	Dec	Year
Record high °C (°F)	43.0 (109.4)	42.8 (109.0)	42.0 (107.6)	38.0 (100.4)	37.0 (98.6)	34.0 (93.2)	34.1 (93.4)	39.6 (103.3)	42.4 (108.3)	43.7 (110.7)	42.0 (107.6)	43.5 (110.3)	43.7 (110.7)
Mean daily maximum °C (°F)	34.1 (93.4)	33.0 (91.4)	31.7 (89.1)	28.6 (83.5)	24.5 (76.1)	22.8 (73.0)	22.7 (72.9)	25.4 (77.7)	27.2 (81.0)	29.5 (85.1)	30.9 (87.6)	33.0 (91.4)	28.6 (83.5)
Daily mean °C (°F)	27.7 (81.9)	26.9 (80.4)	25.6 (78.1)	22.7 (72.9)	19.0 (66.2)	17.3 (63.1)	16.4 (61.5)	18.3 (64.9)	20.4 (68.7)	23.4 (74.1)	24.8 (76.6)	26.9 (80.4)	22.5 (72.5)
Mean daily minimum °C (°F)	22.5 (72.5)	22.0 (71.6)	20.6 (69.1)	18.0 (64.4)	14.6 (58.3)	13.1 (55.6)	11.5 (52.7)	12.7 (54.9)	14.7 (58.5)	18.2 (64.8)	19.2 (66.6)	21.4 (70.5)	17.4 (63.3)
Record low °C (°F)	12.6 (54.7)	11.0 (51.8)	7.7 (45.9)	4.9 (40.8)	−0.1 (31.8)	−0.8 (30.6)	−2.5 (27.5)	−2.3 (27.9)	1.7 (35.1)	5.3 (41.5)	8.0 (46.4)	9.1 (48.4)	−2.5 (27.5)
Average precipitation mm (inches)	163.5 (6.44)	135.6 (5.34)	138.2 (5.44)	159.6 (6.28)	110.1 (4.33)	60.3 (2.37)	41.0 (1.61)	34.8 (1.37)	74.8 (2.94)	150.3 (5.92)	159.9 (6.30)	178.4 (7.02)	1,406.5 (55.37)
Average precipitation days (≥ 0.1 mm)	8.7	8.7	8.0	8.5	8.2	6.7	5.1	4.8	7.1	10.1	8.9	9.2	94.0
Average relative humidity (%)	71.5	74.2	76.4	78.9	81.2	81.0	76.4	70.3	69.3	72.4	71.1	71.4	74.5
Mean monthly sunshine hours	275.9	228.8	226.3	198.0	186.0	153.0	189.1	195.3	183.0	213.9	255.0	269.7	2,574
Mean daily sunshine hours	8.9	8.1	7.3	6.6	6.0	5.1	6.1	6.3	6.1	6.9	8.5	8.7	7.0
Percentage possible sunshine	66	65	60	58	60	54	58	52	52	59	64	67	60
Source 1: Servicio Meteorológico Nacional
Source 2: NOAA (percent sun 1961–1990)

== Sister cities ==
- Asunción, Paraguay
- Bella Unión, Uruguay

== Sports ==
The Aborigen Rugby Club, an Argentine rugby union club from the city of Formosa, was established in 1993.

== Images ==
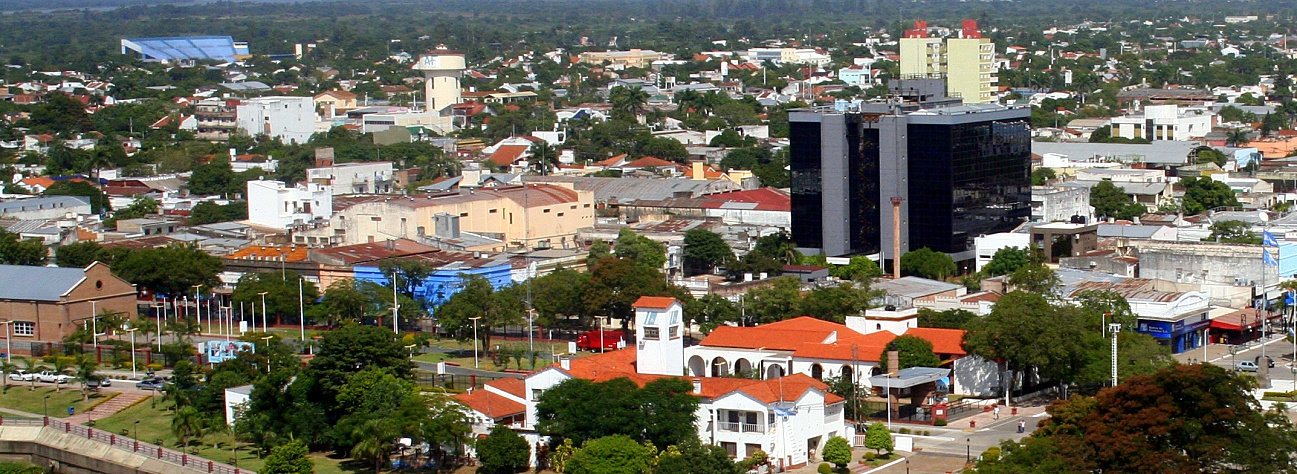
Formosa Provincial Government building, in spotlight

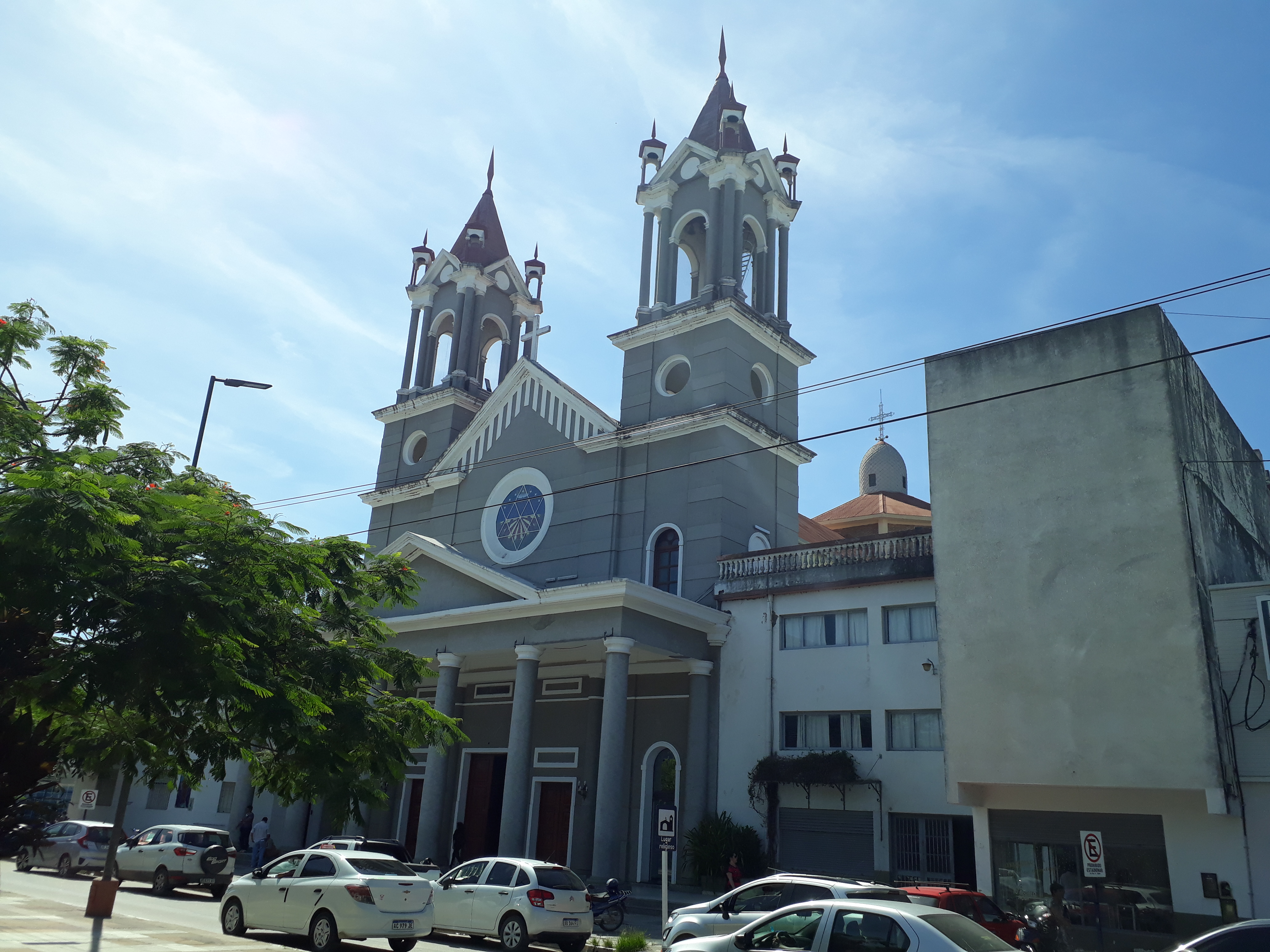
Cathedral of Our Lady of Carmen, in Formosa

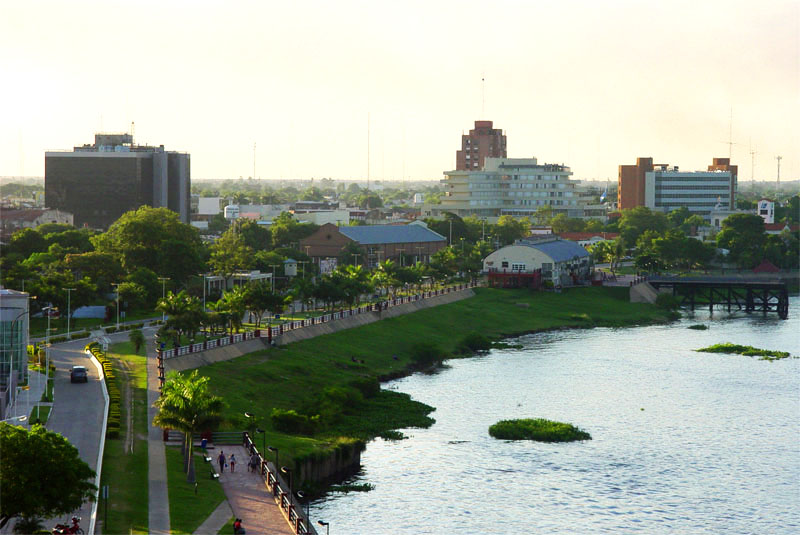
Riverwalk

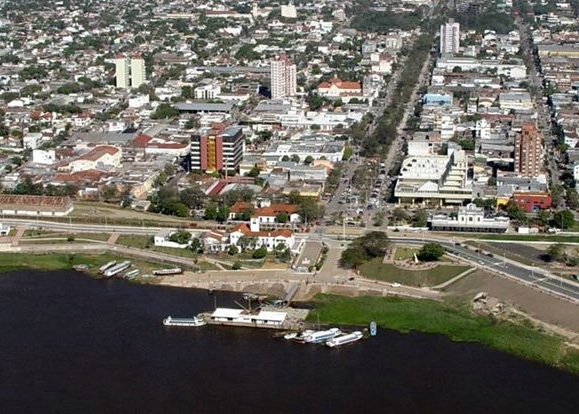
Panorama of the City

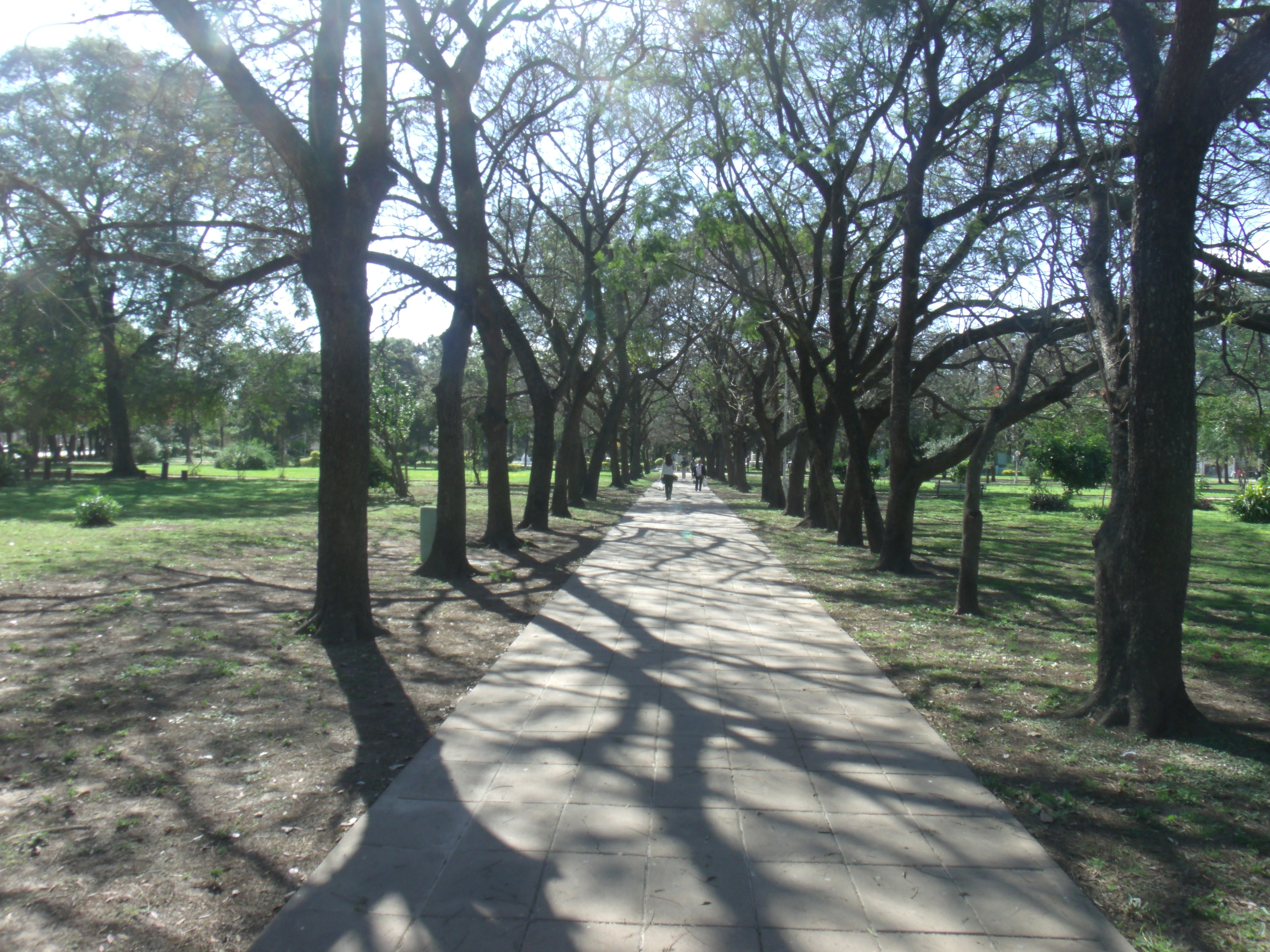
Plaza in El Colorado, Formosa, Argentina

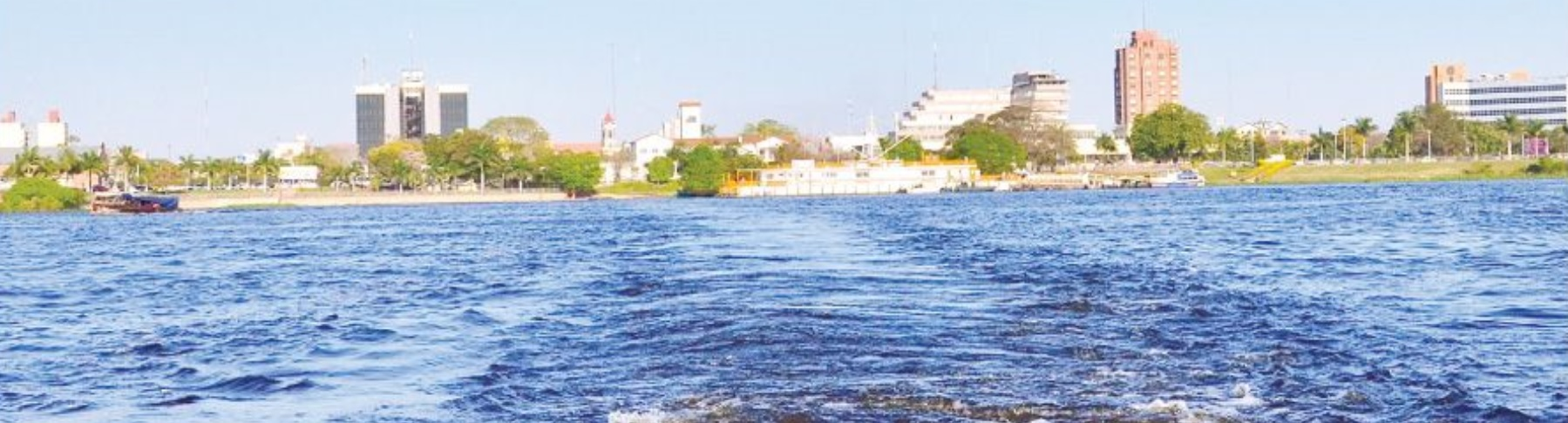
Formosa skyline from the Paraguay River

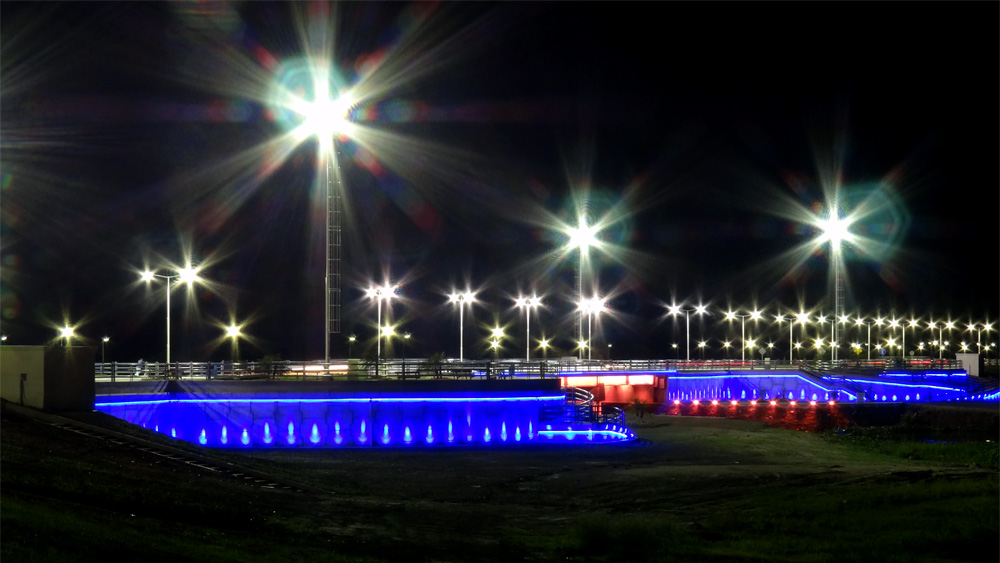
Riacho Bridge, Formosa, Argentina

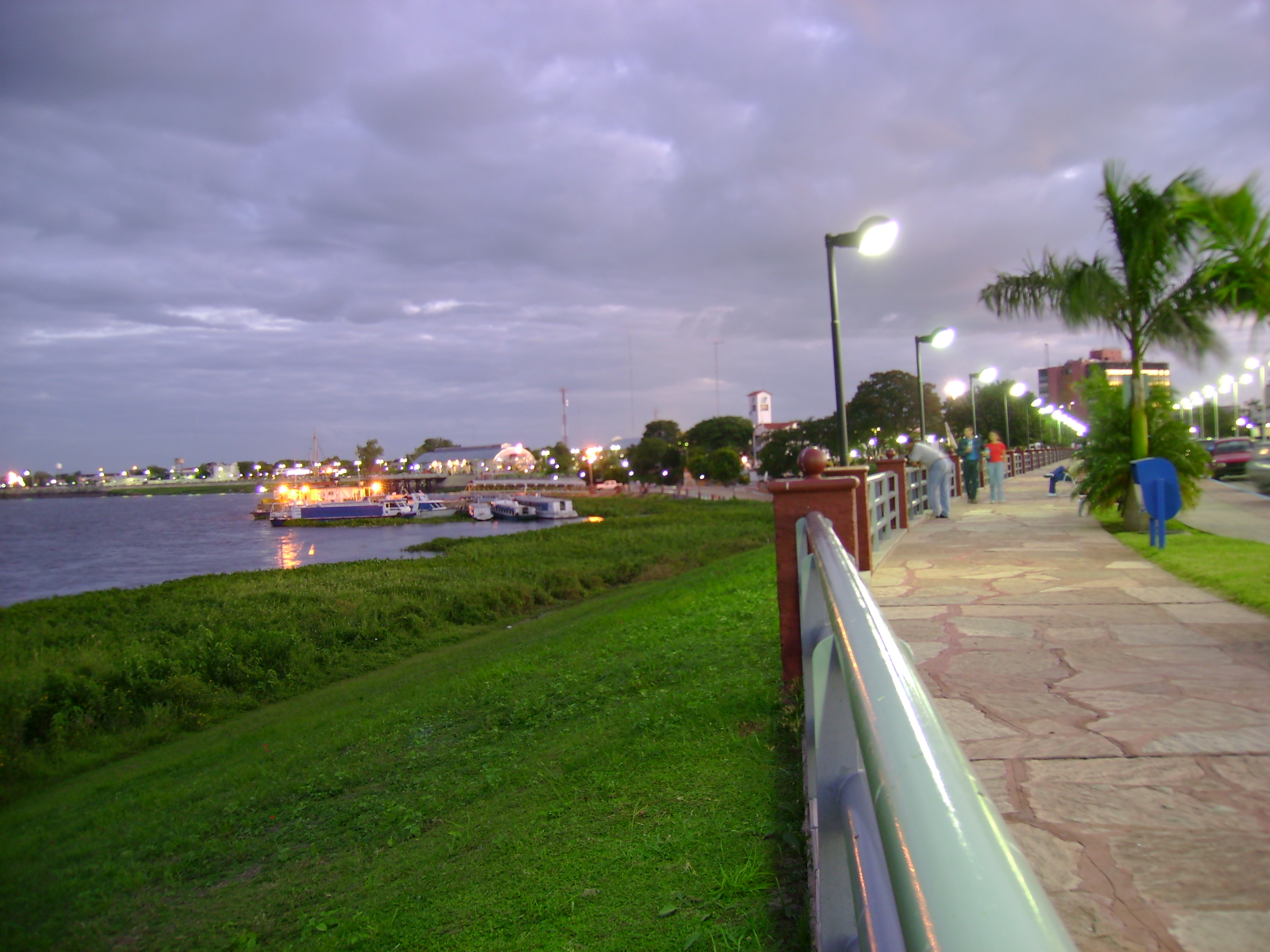
Formosa costanera, Argentina

== Notable people ==
- Martín Alarcón (1928–1988), footballer
- Sergio Barreto (born 1999), footballer
- Andrea Benítez (born 1986), tennis player
- Jorge Berendt (born 1964), golfer
- Raúl Bobadilla (born 1987), Paraguayan footballer
- Floro Bogado (born 1939–2017), politician, lawyer, and diplomat
- Cristian Campozano (born 1985), footballer
- Raúl Chaparro (born 1953), footballer
- Néstor Espínola (born 1985), footballer
- Ramón Fernández (born 1984), Argentine-Chilean footballer
- Gastón Giménez (born 1991), Paraguayan footballer
- Manuel Insaurralde (born 1999), footballer
- Mario Jara (born 1980), football manager
- Hugo Jazmín (born 1979), footballer

- Franco Llamas, footballer
- Edgardo Massa (born 1981), tennis player
- Emiliano Massa (born 1988), tennis player
- Ricardo Mazacotte (born 1985), Argentine-Paraguayan footballer
- Gervasio Núñez (born 1988), footballer
- Lucas Ojeda (born 1986), footballer
- Aldo Paredes (born 1972), footballer
- Lucas Passerini (born 1994), footballer
- Marcos Pinto (born 1994), footballer
- Sebastián Silguero (born 1992), footballer
- Francisco Solano Patiño (born 1990), Paraguayan footballer
- Gabriel Tellas (born 1992), footballer
- Abel Valdez (born 1987), footballer
- Sergio Villamayor (born 1989), modern pentathlete
