= Argentine Littoral =

Region in Argentina

The Argentine littoral

The Argentine littoral (Spanish: Litoral argentino) is a region of Argentina formed by the Mesopotamia region (Misiones, Corrientes and Entre Ríos) along with the provinces of Chaco, Formosa and Santa Fe. Before Argentina became independent, present-day Uruguay and Paraguay were also included in the littoral region.

The inhabitants of this region are called litoraleños.
