= Unitarian Party =

Former political party in Argentina

Unitarian Party Partido Unitario
- Historical leaders: Bernardino Rivadavia; Juan Lavalle; José María Paz; Gregorio Aráoz de Lamadrid
- Founded: 1816
- Dissolved: 1862
- Succeeded by: Autonomist Party; Liberal Party; Nationalist Party
- Headquarters: Buenos Aires, Argentina
- Ideology: Liberalism; Free trade Progressivism; Centralism; Pro-unitary state Pro-private property Pro-foreign investment
- Colors: Blue

Party flag

The Unitarian Party (Spanish: Partido Unitario) was a political party that were proponents of the concept of a unitary state (centralized government) in Buenos Aires during the civil wars that shortly followed the Declaration of Independence of Argentina in 1816. They were opposed to the Argentine Federalists, who wanted a federation of autonomous provinces.

== History ==
In the Argentine War of Independence, the forces of the United Provinces of the Río de la Plata fought Spanish royalists who attempted to regain control of their American colonies after the Napoleonic Wars.

After the victorious May Revolution of 1810, disagreements arose between the dominant province of Buenos Aires, who were known as Unitarianists, and the other provinces of Argentina, known as the Federalists. These were evident at least as early as the declaration of Argentine independence in 1816.

The Unitarianists lost their controlling power after the Battle of Cepeda (1820), which was followed by several months of chaos. However, the Unitarianists were forced to sign a treaty with other provinces. This did not solve the conflicts between the Federalists and the Unitarians.

=== Bernardino Rivadavia ===
The beliefs of Bernardino Rivadavia were strongly influenced by English philosopher Jeremy Bentham. Bentham's ideas ranged from constitutional law to prison reform which grew from a desire to perfect policy. As laws were being drafted for the new nation, Rivadavia sought to assure Bentham they were "Entirely based on the unimpeachable and indisputable truths contained in your work." He would soon advocate for a central government for the entire nation, adopting this principle of unitary government and later, along with his allies became known as the Unitarians.

Under President Bernardino Rivadavia (1826–1827), the Unitarianists gained control for a short period of time. The Constitution of 1826 allowed for a balance between the ideas of the Unitarianists and the Federalists: “It provided for a centralized national authority while leaving the provinces with considerable local powers.” However, the constitution was rejected by provincial caudillos, military leaders, and the conflict continued.

== History Continued ==
Forced to resign, the government of Buenos Aires and the foreign relations of the country were taken over by Federalist Manuel Dorrego. However, a contingent of military led by Juan Lavalle, opposed to the peace negotiations with the Brazilian Empire after the end of the Cisplatine War took over the Buenos Aires government and shot Dorrego at Navarro.

In 1829, Juan Manuel de Rosas, the leader of a troop of Federalists, became the Governor of Buenos Aires after defeating General Juan Lavalle, who was then forced into exile. Although Rosas was a Federalist, his following of the principles of Federalism has often been questioned.

In 1830, the Unitarian League was created by General José María Paz in order to defeat the Federalists. The Federalists faced Paz and his troops on May 31, 1831 and the Unitarianists were defeated after the Gauchos captured the Unitarianist commander. The Provinces of the Unitarian League gradually joined into the Federal Pact and the Argentine Confederation.

Although the Unitarians were exiled to neighboring countries, the civil war would continue for another two decades, the Unitarians being led by Lavalle, Paz, Lamadrid, and others.

With support from Corrientes Province and the Brazilian Empire, Justo José de Urquiza, Federalist caudillo of Entre Ríos Province, finally defeated Rosas at the Battle of Caseros on February 3, 1852. In May, the San Nicolás Agreement was signed by the provincial governors. The pact reinstated the 1831 Federal Pact's original provisions for a constitutional convention.

In 1853, the Autonomists of Buenos Aires (many of them former Unitarians) broke away from the Argentine Confederation after Urquiza nationalized the customs receipts from Buenos Aires and allowed the free flow of trade on the Parana and Uruguay rivers. In 1859 Buenos Aires was forced to accept the federal constitution of 1853 after six years of secession, after Mitre was defeated at the 1859 Battle of Cepeda by Urquiza. However, the federal constitution was "amended to allow Buenos Aires greater influence" after the ensuing 1861 Battle of Pavón. Mitre was then chosen as President of a new national government.

Opposition to the Unitarianists continued until 1890 under the Córdoba League.

== Ideology and principles ==
The Unitarians defended a liberal ideology, which was influenced by British liberalism of the early 19th century.

This group was led by intellectuals, merchants and the military from Buenos Aires and by some members of the elites of the provinces of the interior of the country.

In the political field, the Unitarians defended the establishment of a central government with broad powers, which could impose its authority over the provinces. In the economic field, they defended private property, free trade and the arrival of foreign investment.

== Notable members ==
- Bernardino Rivadavia
- Juan Lavalle
- José María Paz
- Gregorio Aráoz de Lamadrid
- José Rondeau
- Martín Rodríguez
- Juan Martín de Pueyrredón
- Bartolomé Mitre
- Domingo Faustino Sarmiento
- Carlos María de Alvear
- Juan Antonio Álvarez de Arenales
- Joaquín Madariaga
- Juan Madariaga
- Nicanor Cáceres
- Rudecindo Alvarado
- Wenceslao Paunero
- Manuel Hornos
- José Ignacio de Gorriti
- Marco Avellaneda
- Juan Andrés Gelly y Obes
- Pedro de Garmendia
- Francisco Javier López
- Bernabé Piedrabuena
- José Víctor Posse
- José Manuel Silva
- Manuel Lacoa
- Javier Paz

== See also ==
- History of Argentina
- United Provinces of South America
- Bernardino Rivadavia
