= Nicanor Cáceres =

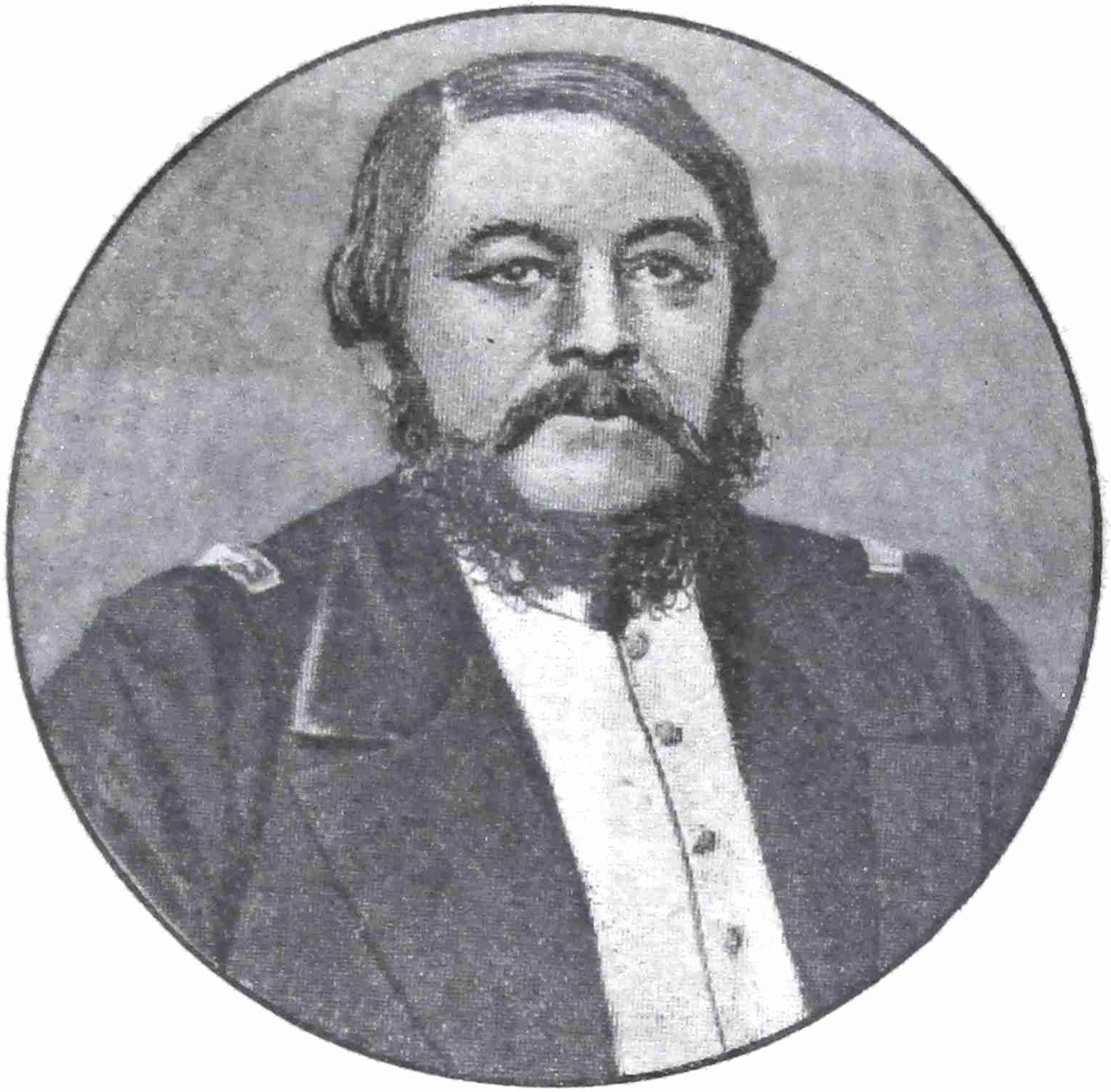
- Born: 1813; Curuzú Cuatiá, Corrientes, Rio de la Plata
- Died: 1870 (aged 56–57); Salto, Salto Department, Uruguay
- Military career
- Allegiance: Argentina
- Branch: Argentine Army
- Service years: 1824 – 1870
- Rank: General
- Conflicts: Argentine Civil Wars; Paraguayan War; Corrientes campaign

Nicanor Cáceres (1813-1870) was an Argentine general and rancher. He was one of the key Argentine military generals during the Argentine Civil Wars as well as the Paraguayan invasion of Corrientes.

== Military career ==
He was the son of a D. Marcelo Cáceres who was Spanish merchant, who shortly after would buy the ranch El Paraíso, a huge estate near Curuzú Cuatiá and D. Francisca Rodríguez who had a modest social position.

Since 1824, he specialized in commanding men and managing estates and was a volunteer soldier of the border militias of southern Corrientes, and made a long career under the orders of General Manuel Vicente Ramírez. He fought in the Battles of Pago Largo, Caaguazú and Arroyo Grande.

He remained in rebellion in the mountains of the south of the province, until in 1843, he supported Joaquín Madariaga's invasion of Corrientes, and his participation allowed them to advance without problems throughout the south of the province. With that they were able to overturn the provincial situation from the beginning. That earned him promotion to lieutenant colonel and command over the entire southern border of the province.

He formed in the ranks of General Paz's army. When Justo José de Urquiza invaded Corrientes, Cáceres was defeated in a small battle at Las Osamentas, shortly before the Battle of Laguna Limpia. When Urquiza withdrew, Cáceres was ordered to pursue him, but he could do little.

== Urquiza and Pujol ==
When the conflict between Paz and the governor broke out, which cost the former a new exile, he switched sides and joined the ranks of Urquiza's forces. On Urquiza's side he fought in the Battle of Vences and was promoted to colonel.

He was again the head of the southern border. From his stay at his military camp, he had de facto unlimited authority over the entire southern zone, including, in addition to Curuzú Cuatiá, Mercedes, Paso de los Libres, Esquina, etc. His specialty was long and fast marches, with which he surprised his enemies; his appearance, with red hair and beard, added authority into the ranks.

He also fought in the campaign against the small Paraguayan invasion of 1849 .

He fought in the Battle of Caseros and soon returned to Corrientes. Shortly after arriving he led the uprising against Governor Benjamín Virasoro.

He was promoted to general—for revolutionary merits—by the new governor Juan Gregorio Pujol, a friend of Urquiza.

In 1853 he supported Pujol against a revolt led by allies of the Virasoros, but his excessive power led the governor to displace him. This led to Cáceres himself rebelling at the end of that year, failing in that revolution and in two invasions of his province. After his definitive failure in 1855, he went into exile in the province of Entre Ríos, after an arrest of several months. He later lived in Santa Fe.

== Paraguayan War ==
After the Battle of Pavón, a liberal revolution broke out in Corrientes. The new governor, José Pampín, called him to take charge of the forces in the south of the province. The military chiefs of that area refused to abide by his authority, but Cáceres defeated them in combat at Curuzú Cuatiá in August 1862.

In 1865, the Paraguayans invaded Corrientes, beginning Argentine involvement in the Paraguayan War. Cáceres led the gathering of the provincial forces for the Corrientes resistance. He was the first to occupy the city when the Paraguayans withdrew.

At the end of Governor Manuel Lagraña's mandate, he imposed the election of his friend Evaristo López. He participated in the Humaitá campaign, but didn't fight in any specific battle and returned to Corrientes in 1867.

He constantly participated in different revolts and substitutions of Corrientes governments. First, it was against Benjamín Virasoro, later, against his old ally, Juan Pujol and in 1861, he participated with the liberals, overthrowing José María Rolón. From then on, he achieved the confidence of the Liberal Party, which gave him high military promotions, including that of Colonel Major of the Nation, to later become a general. At the outbreak of the war against Paraguay, in 1865, he was commander in chief of the Corrientes cavalry, and later head of the vanguard division, participating in the battles of Paso de la Patria, Estero Ballaco, Tuyutí, Boquerón and Itapirú.

He returned to Corrientes in September 1866, settling in Curuzú Cuatiá. He actively acted in the government of the urquicista Evaristo López, whom he defended and tried to support in the revolt of his overthrow on May 27, 1868. After the overthrow of López, he settled in Entre Ríos and achieved an alliance with Ricardo López Jordán. The ambivalent and agitated political life of Cáceres makes him a particular character and at the same time necessary for the study of Argentine political life in the period between the battle of Caseros and the War with Paraguay.

== Exile and death ==
When the liberal revolution of 1868 broke out, he kept the southern half of the rebel province under the authority of the revolutionaries for several months, with the support of federal chiefs from Entre Ríos, especially General Ricardo López Jordán. He defeated his enemies at the Battle of Arroyo Garay, on the last day of July, and began the advance on the capital.

But President Bartolomé Mitre decided to recognize the revolutionary government of Corrientes, and sent several divisions of the Argentine Army to their aid, separating them from the Paraguayan front. Cáceres was forced to retreat to the south, ending up in exile in Entre Ríos. In many history texts, this war appeared as a rebellion by Cáceres, but Cáceres sought to replace the democratically elected constitutional governor, and the president supported the chief who had overthrown him.

He participated in the Jordanian rebellion of 1870, but soon went into exile in Uruguay, from where he would never return and died in 1870.
