= Battle of San Lorenzo River =

- Part of the Corrientes campaign
Date	April 28, 1865
Location	San Lorenzo River, Argentina
Result	Paraguayan victory

Belligerents
Paraguay	Argentina

Commanders and leaders
José de Jesús Matínez	Unknown

Strength
50 horsemen	400 horsemen

Casualties and losses
4 killed	Unknown

The battle of the San Lorenzo River was the first engagement between Paraguayan and Argentine forces in the Paraguayan War. The combat took place near the San Lorenzo River, in Argentina, on April 28, 1865 during the Corrientes Campaign and ended with the victory of the Paraguayans.

== The battle ==
A Paraguayan cavalry regiment of 50 horsemen under the command of Lieutenant José de Jesús Martínez was surrounded by 400 well-equipped Argentine horsemen, close to the San Lorenzo river. After the Paraguayan commander's refusal to surrender, the Argentines began a series of attacks on the regiment, with the Paraguayans resisting and breaking the siege, managing to escape. The number of casualties on the Argentine side is not known. Paraguay had 4 riders killed and several wounded.
