= Manuel Lagraña =

Argentine politician (1821–1882)

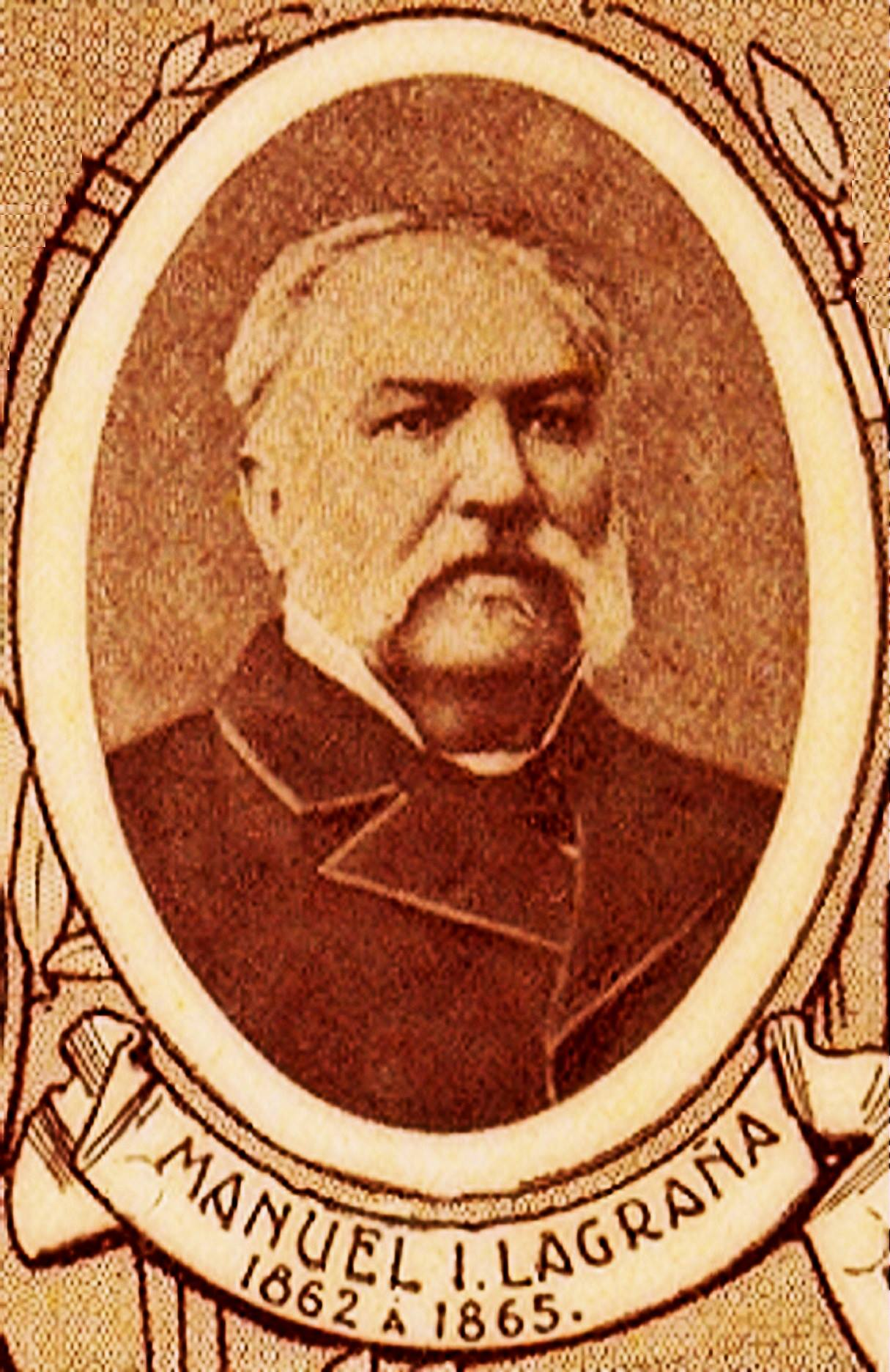

21st and 23rd Governor of Corrientes Province
- Preceded by: José Pampín
- Succeeded by: Víctor Silvero
- Preceded by: Víctor Silvero
- Succeeded by: Evaristo López

Personal details
- Born: 1821 Corrientes, Corrientes Province, Rio de la Plata
- Died: 1882 (aged 60–61) Buenos Aires, Buenos Aires Province, Argentina

Military service
- Allegiance: Argentina
- Branch: Argentine Army
- Years of service: 1856 – 1882
- Battles/wars: Paraguayan War; Corrientes campaign

Manuel Ignacio Lagraña (1821-1882) was an Argentine politician and military figure. He was the 21st and 23rd Governor of Corrientes Province and the governor of the province when the Paraguayans invaded the province during the Corrientes campaign of the Paraguayan War.

== Biography ==
He studied at the Franciscan convent in the city of Corrientes and in his youth he devoted himself to commerce.

He was a provincial deputy for the liberal party in 1856, and supported the government of Juan Gregorio Pujol. During the government of José María Rolón, he was president of the Banco Hipotecario de Corrientes, the only one in the province. He supported the overthrow of federal governor Rolón at the end of 1861 and during the mandate of liberal José Pampín, he was the owner of the newspaper La Libertad, directed by Juan Eusebio Torrent and was a member of the Education Council.

He was elected governor without opposition to his appointment and took office in December 1862. Despite the lack of support from his co-religionists, he carried out an administration characterized by industrial and commercial revival. He sought the collaboration of all political forces for the well-being of Corrientes and his works left deep traces of progress towards political unity. He founded the towns of Alvear and Ituzaingó and ordered the transfer and repopulation of the town of Santo Tomé to its current location, created several schools in the interior, allowed the settlement of farming families for the cultivation of tobacco and cotton, where they received seeds for free and without tax levies. For infrastructure, he created courier lines between the towns of the interior and steam transport to Corrientes, collaborated with the national government for the construction of the railway. During his mandate, the provincial constitution was reformed, in tune with the liberal administration of President Bartolomé Mitre.

On April 13, 1865, the city was suddenly occupied by the Paraguayan Army, whose government had recently declared war on Argentina with the city itself being poorly defended. Lagraña moved quickly and abandoned the city, gathering the capital's militias under the command of Desiderio Sosa in the vicinity of the town of San Roque, which he declared the provisional capital of the province. He then waited for a few days for the support of General Nicanor Cáceres who had promised to go quickly to his aid while the Paraguayan forces increased rapidly, in addition to some Federalists parties joining the Paraguayan invaders.

When a triumvirate of Federalists, Teodoro Gauna, Víctor Silver, Sinforoso Cáceres assumed the government and the numerical superiority of the invaders became overwhelming, Lagraña withdrew to the south, settling in Goya.

He had refused to communicate the news, until receiving an official communication from the Paraguayan government which was still being discussed if the news would ever reach the hands of Mitre. In response to the attack, which he described as treacherous for supposedly having been made without a declaration of war, Mitre declared war on Paraguay, beginning the Correintes campaign of the Paraguayan War.

The Corrientes Province with the Paraguayan occupation and with the election of the Governing Board, divided the province since the political positions that the people of Corrientes either sympathized with the Paraguayans or remained loyal with the government of Lagraña.

Despite the provisional capital being at San Roque, the main political headquarters changed from Empedrado, Esquina, Goya, Curuzú Cuatiá and Bella Vista.

During the time that the Paraguayan occupation lasted, the effective jurisdiction over a vast area of the provincial territory was divided in two, and on several occasions in some disputed departments there were local authorities appointed by both the Governing Board and Governor Lagraña.

Lagraña's government was an indispensable asset in the effort to contain the Paraguayan advance along the coast of the Paraná River, since it organized the first battalions and structured a small headquarters of military commands with officers from Corrientes. These constituted a small vanguard of what would be months after the mobilization of the bulk of the Argentine army.

In Goya, General Wenceslao Paunero, arrived on Argentine and Brazilian warships and placed himself under Lagraña's command. From there, he marched on towards the city of Corrientes, which thanks to the surprise attack, managed to occupy it for less than a day, but ended up being forced to withdraw. For their part, the Paraguayans advanced to near Goya, but were stopped by an untimely order from Paraguayan President López.

He returned to the provincial capital in the month of October, after the Allied victories in the Battle of Yatay and the Siege of Uruguaiana, which forced the Paraguayan withdrawal.

In December, under pressure from General Cáceres, the legislature was renewed with a federal majority, which elected Evaristo López as governor. Less than two years later, Lagraña participated in the revolution that deposed López, with the help of the Argentine Army campaigning in Paraguay.

After several years removed from power by the absorbing personality of Santiago Baibiene, he was elected national deputy in 1876 .

He died in Buenos Aires in February 1882 .
