= Ignacio Rivas =

Argentine general (1827–1880)

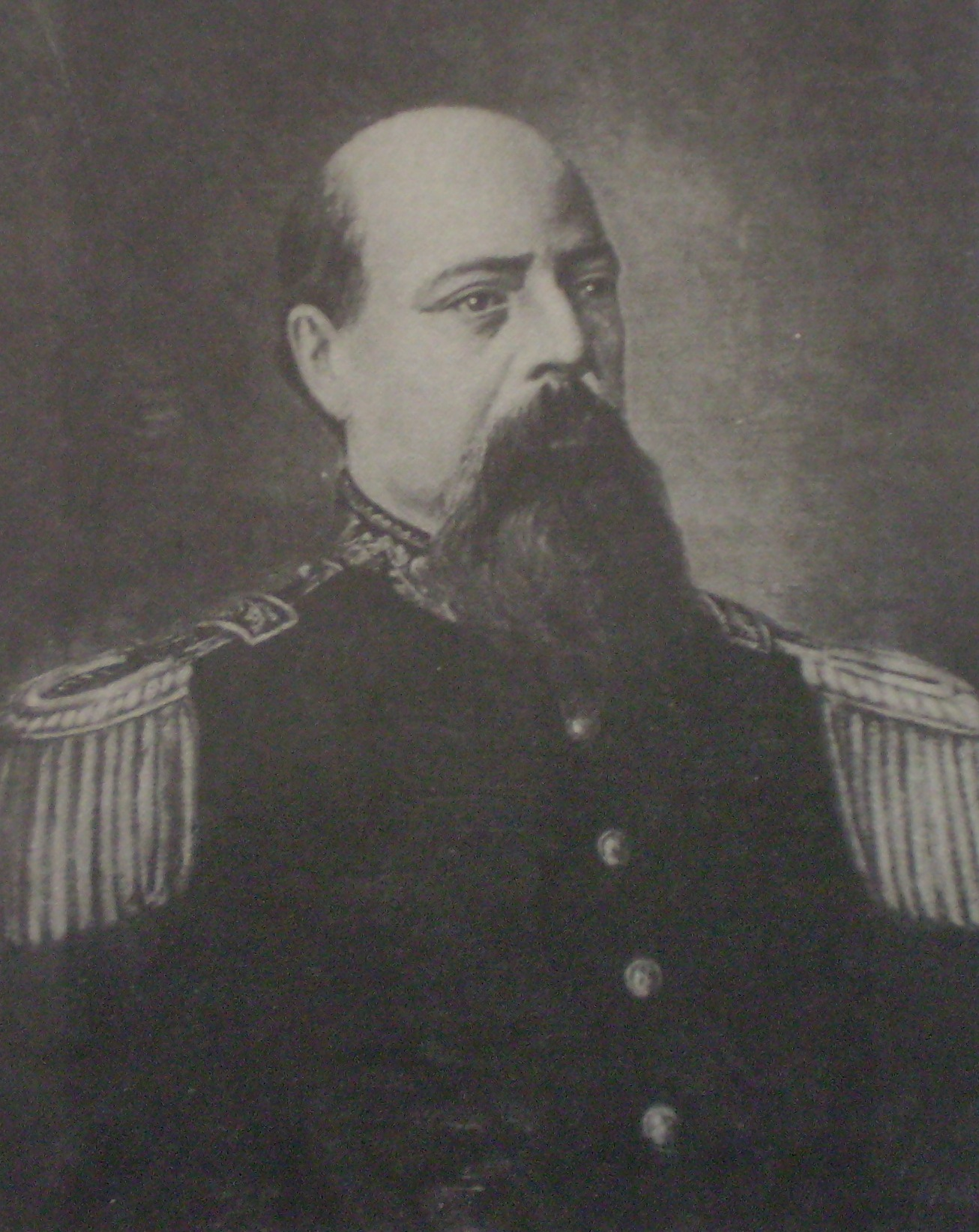
- Born: July 31, 1827; Paysandú, Oriental Province, Río de la Plata
- Died: April 8, 1880 (aged 52); Buenos Aires, Buenos Aires Province, Argentina
- Military career
- Allegiance: Defense Government; State of Buenos Aires; Argentina
- Branch: National Army of Uruguay; Argentine Army
- Service years: 1843 – 1874; 1877 – 1880
- Rank: General de división
- Conflicts: Argentine Civil Wars; Battle of Sierra Chica; Battle of San Jacinto; Battle of Cepeda; Battle of Pavón; Uruguayan Civil War; Great Siege of Montevideo; Battle of Caseros; Paraguayan War; Humaitá campaign; Battle of Estero Bellaco; Battle of Tuyutí; Battle of Curupayty (WIA); Pikysyry campaign; Battle of Lomas Valentinas; Jordanist Rebellion; Battle of Don Cristóbal; Conquest of the Desert; Battle of San Carlos de Bolívar; Revolution of 1874 (POW)

Ignacio Rivas Graces (1827–1880) was a Uruguayan-born Argentine Divisional General of the Argentine Civil Wars and the Paraguayan War. He was notable for being one of the main general who sided with Bartolomé Mitre during the Revolution of 1874 but when he was arrested he was discharged and after being pardoned, he was reincorporated into the Argentine Army in 1877.

== Family and Origin ==
Ignacio Rivas was born on July 31, 1827, at Paysandú, Oriental Province which then had rejoined the United Provinces of the Río de la Plata two years ago after separating from the Empire of Brazil. Ignacio was the son of the Spanish-Andalusian landowner Andrés Rivas (b. ca. 1781 – Tacuarembó, Uruguay, ca. 1857) and his Portuguese-Brazilian wife Ignacia Graces (b. Captaincy of Rio Grande de San Pedro, ca. 1800 – Salto, Uruguay, ca. 1880).

He had four siblings, the eldest was a paternal half-sister named Andrea Rivas (c.. 1820 – d. 1895) who married Rafael Bosch, Doraliza Rivas Graces (Paysandú, ca. 1826 – Buenos Aires, Argentina, December 20, 1908) who married in 1842 with the then infantry lieutenant Estanislao Panelo y Pérez de Saravia who would later be the Mayor of Concordia in 1849, and the minors were the Argentine-Uruguayan landowner Andrés Riva and Narcisa Rivas Graces.

== Uruguay and Caseros ==
Rivas enlisted as a cadet as a defender of the Great Siege of Montevideo during the Uruguayan Civil War and became a personal friend of Bartolomé Mitre. He participated in the Battle of Caseros and in the fight against the federals of Buenos Aires, in 1852 and 1853.

He served on the border with the Argentine Confederation and seconded Manuel Hornos during the Battle of El Tala on November 8, 1854, repelling the invasion of Hilario Lagos.

== Service with the Native Americans ==
In 1855, he was sent to the southern border with the Amerindians in Azul. Months later, he established a camp called "Tapalqué Nuevo" on the western bank of the Tapalquén Stream. A short time later, the camp was frustrated due to the close defeats of Bartolomé Mitre in the Battle of Sierra Chica and Manuel Hornos in the Battle of San Jacinto. The area would not be populated by Christians until shortly before the official founding of the town of Olavarría at the end of November 1867.

He participated in the Battle of Tapalqué, in which together with Hornos they repelled the attack of Juan Calfucurá. Months later in 1856, he repressed the uprising of the Redshirts of the Bahía Blanca Military Agricultural Legion, integrating an intervention commission, together with lieutenant colonels José Murature and Juan Susviela with the objective of dominating the state of subversion after the assassination of its commander, Colonel Silvino Olivieri.

== Battles of Cepeda and Pavón ==
In 1858, he was promoted to colonel and appointed commander of the southern border. He fought in the Battle of Cepeda as head of a cavalry regiment. He returned to Fort Cruz de Guerra where he repelled a Native American attack from Calfucurá who helped the Federalists in their attempt to control the south of the province, advanced to the Chico Stream that crosses the San Juan ranch, where they were finally repulsed.

In 1861, he also fought in the Battle of Pavón. Weeks later he was placed in command of a division of 2,000 men that was to invade the Cuyo Province, of which Domingo Faustino Sarmiento was second in command. He put this as Governor of San Juan Province, Luis Molina in Mendoza and Justo Daract in San Luis Province but he never organized elections.

He participated in the campaigns against "Chacho" Peñaloza, who convulsed seven provinces against the Buenos Aires invaders. He pursued the montoneros throughout La Rioja and San Luis, and defeated them in the battles of Las Mulitas and Los Gigantes. But he convinced Mitre that an agreement should be reached with Peñaloza because it was the only real guarantee of peace. He then signed the Treaty of La Banderita with him through which the submission of Chacho and his men was negotiated in exchange for an amnesty for all the montoneros. Once the signing of the treaties was finished, Chacho handed over the prisoner officers that he had in his power, and received nothing in exchange as all the imprisoned officers had been shot.

== Paraguayan War ==
Rivas then returned to Azul and fought some battles against some Native Americans. In April 1865, he joined Wenceslao Paunero's division, marching to the Paraguayan War. He fought in the Corrientes campaign within the Battle of Yatay and the Humaitá campaign within the battles of Estero Bellaco and Tuyutí. He was the head of the first regiment that began the Battle of Curupayty, where the allies had six thousand casualties and the defenders less than seventy. He was seriously wounded, but even so he kept fighting and Mitre promoted him to General de división.

After a period of recovery in Buenos Aires, he led a campaign through the Chaco to take the Fortress of Humaitá from behind, but it failed. He also participated in the final campaigns of that war, which allowed Asunción to be captured after the Battle of Lomas Valentinas.

== Jordanist Rebellion and the Conquest of the Desert ==
He returned to Buenos Aires in 1869 and was appointed commander of the southern frontier sections of the Buenos Aires Province. In the middle of 1870, he went to Entre Ríos Province to crush the uprising of the last Federalist leader, Ricardo López Jordán as head of the departments on the coast of the Uruguay River. On October 12 of that year, he defeated him in the Battle of Santa Rosa and, shortly after, with the help of General Juan Andrés Gelly y Obes, he defeated him again in the Battle of Don Cristóbal.

In March 1872, Lonco Calfucurá led a large army of Native Americans into Christian territory again but he made the critical error of facing the forces that came out to pursue him in open field and in general battle. General Rivas decisively defeated him at the Battle of San Carlos de Bolívar. It was the worst defeat for the Amerindians in a long time, and began their final withdrawal from the Buenos Aires Province. A few weeks later, Calfucurá died and Rivas took the opportunity to campaign within the indigenous territory, capturing Atreucó which was one of Calfucurá's main camps.

== Revolution of 1874 ==
In 1874, he was one of the main figures of the Revolution of 1874 who supported Mitre against President Nicolás Avellaneda due to fraudulent elections such as how Mitre did before. Mitre believed that there was some difference between his fraud and that of the others and he launched the revolution.

Rivas organized the forces within the interior of the Buenos Aires Province and then placed himself under the orders of Mitre. Although they managed to gather important contingents, they couldn't obtain any key victories. By order of Mitre, they headed towards the north of the province, but on their way, they encountered the entrenched forces of Colonel José Inocencio Arias at the ranch of La Verde and were completely defeated on November 26.

A week later, they surrendered and signed the Treaty of Junín. He was taken prisoner to Buenos Aires and a request was made for Rivas to be sentenced to death. After a few months in prison he was discharged and pardoned by Avellaneda.

== Final Years ==
He was reinstated in the army in 1877 but wouldn't be given any commands as the General Staff considered him dangerous which resulted in his absence from the later years of the Campaign of the Desert. General Ignacio Rivas died on April 8, 1880, in the city of Buenos Aires.

== Personal life ==
Ignacio Rivas Graces married Martina Juliana Rebución on June 8, 1857, in Buenos Aires. They would proceed to have five sons:

- Félix Rivas Rebución (b. Azul, State of Buenos Aires, 1860).
- Martina Rivas Rebución (b. ca. 1866).
- Carlos Rivas Rebución (Azul, Buenos Aires province, December 13, 1872 – Buenos Aires, December 14, 1926) who married on December 2, 1919, in the Parish Nuestra Señora de Balvanera with Elisa Cerana Paz ( n. ca. 1879 – d. 1960) and with whom he had six children:
- Carlos Ignacio, Elisa, Ignacio Andrés, María Salomé, Félix Ignacio and César Ignacio Rivas Cerana.
- Raúl Rivas Rebución (b. ca. 1875).
- César Rivas Rebución (b. 1877) who married Anunciación Quintana Etchar (b. 1887) on October 14, 1914, in the Basilica of Our Lady of Mercy, Buenos Aires and had two daughters: Julia Sofía (b. Buenos Aires, February 20, 1905) and Martina Rivas Quintana (b. March 22, 1908).
