= Paso de los Libres Airport =

Airport in Argentina

Paso de los Libres Airport Aeropuerto de Paso de los Libres
- IATA: AOL; ICAO: SARL

Summary
- Operator: ANAC
- Serves: Paso de los Libres, Argentina
- Elevation AMSL: 230 ft / 70 m
- Coordinates: 29°41′23″S 57°09′05″W

Map
- Location of the airport in Argentina

Runways
Direction	Length		Surface
Direction	m	ft	Surface
18/36	2,260	7,415	Asphalt
- Sources: AIP ORSNA, WAD Google Maps SkyVector

Paso de los Libres Airport (Spanish: Aeropuerto de Paso de los Libres) (IATA: AOL, ICAO: SARL) is an international airport serving Paso de los Libres, a town on the Uruguay River in Corrientes Province, Argentina. The airport is 6 kilometres (4 mi) west of the city, and 8 kilometres (5 mi) from the river, which is locally the border between Argentina and Brazil.

The airfield covers an area of 77 hectares (190 acres) and has a 600 square metres (6,500 sq ft) terminal. The Paso De Los Libres non-directional beacon (Ident: LIB) is located on the field.

== See also ==
- Transport in Argentina
- List of airports in Argentina
