= Mercedes Department =

Mercedes Department Departamento Mercedes (Spanish) Tetãvore Merséde (Guarani)
- Department
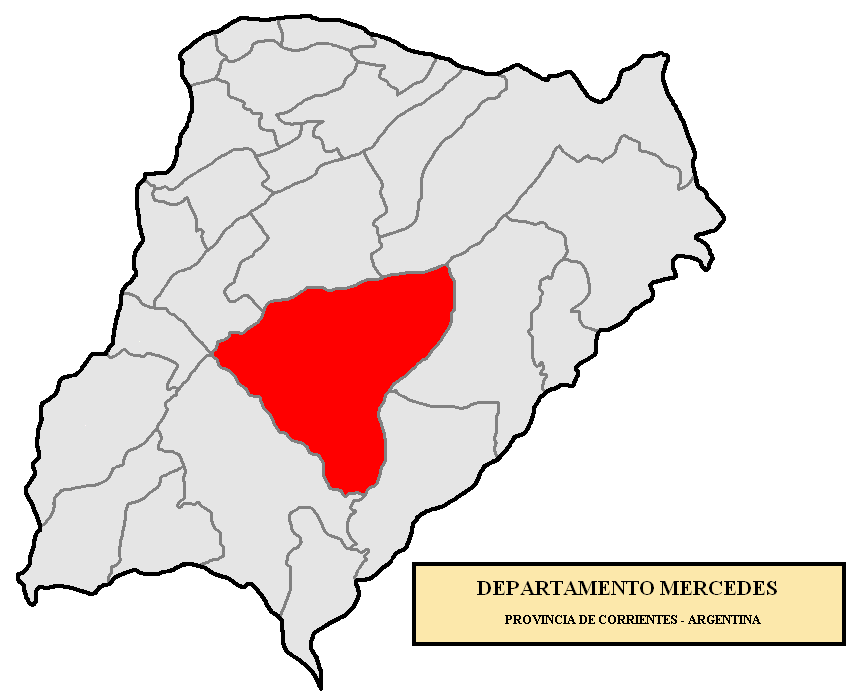
- location of Mercedes Department in Corrientes Province
- Coordinates: 29°12′S 58°05′W
- Country: Argentina
- Seat: Mercedes

Area
  - Total: 9,588 km^{2} (3,702 sq mi)

Population (2001 census [INDEC])
  - Total: 39,206
  - Density: 4.089/km^{2} (10.59/sq mi)
- Postal Code: W3470
- Area Code: 03773
- Website: www.mercedescorrientes.gov.ar

Mercedes Department is a department of Corrientes Province in Argentina.

The provincial subdivision has a population of about 39,206 inhabitants in an area of 9,588 square kilometres (3,702 sq mi), and its capital city is Mercedes, which is located around 700 kilometres (435 mi) from Buenos Aires.

It is the site of the Battle of Caaguazú during the Argentine Civil War in 1841.

== Settlements ==
- Felipe Yofré
- Mariano I. Loza
- Mercedes
