= Manuel Hornos =

Argentine general

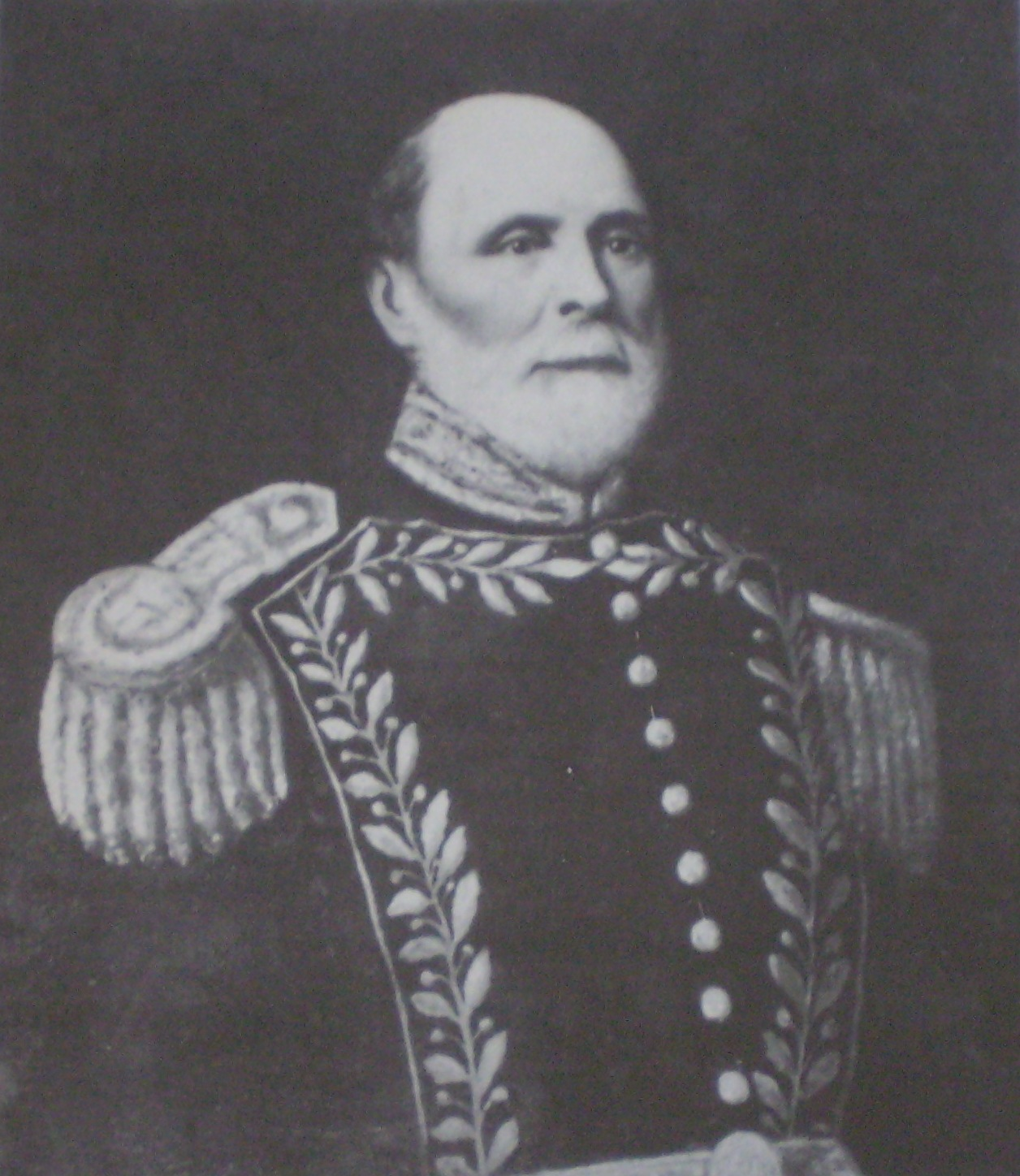
- Born: July 18, 1807; Entre Ríos, Viceroyalty of the Río de la Plata, Spanish Empire
- Died: July 15, 1871 (aged 63); Buenos Aires, Buenos Aires Province, Argentina
- Burial place: La Plata Cemetery, Buenos Aires, Argentina
- Military career
- Allegiance: Argentine Confederation; Colorados; Argentina
- Branch: Argentine Army
- Service years: 1821 – 1870
- Rank: General
- Conflicts: List: Uruguayan Civil War; Battle of Carpintería; Battle of Palmar; Argentine Civil Wars; Second Army of Corrientes against Rosas; Battle of Yeruá; Battle of Don Cristóbal; Battle of Sauce Grande; Battle of Quebracho Herrado; Battle of Famaillá; Third Army of Corrientes against Rosas; Battle of Caaguazú; Battle of Cepeda; Battle of Pavón; Paraguayan War; Humaitá campaign; Battle of Tuyutí

Manuel Hornos (1807–1871) was an Argentine general who participated throughout the Argentine Civil Wars and the Paraguayan War. He was known for his service at the Battle of Tuyutí where he was a major contributor to the Argentine victory at the battle.

== Military career ==
Manuel was a small rancher who joined the army of his province at the time of Governor Lucio Norberto Mansilla and supported his successor, Juan León Solas. When he was overthrown in 1830, he fled to Uruguay by swimming across the Uruguay River.

During the Uruguayan Civil War in 1836, he fought in the ranks of Fructuoso Rivera, in the battles of Carpintería and Palmar.

In 1840 he joined General Juan Lavalle's campaign against the governors of Buenos Aires Province, Juan Manuel de Rosas and the Governor of Entre Ríos, Pascual Echagüe. He accompanied him throughout his campaign and had a valuable performance in the defeats of Quebracho Herrado and Famaillá.

Shortly before Lavalle's death, he joined the group of Corrientes that crossed the Chaco towards Corrientes, and joined the forces of José María Paz. He stood out in the Battle of Caaguazú, which was the definitive defeat of Echagüe, and participated in Paz's invasion of Entre Ríos. He returned to Corrientes when Paz was isolated in Paraná and led part of the Corrientes cavalry in the Battle of Arroyo Grande.

After that defeat he crossed to Uruguay with Rivera, and defeated General Eugenio Garzón in a small battle, for which he was promoted to colonel. In 1846, he was commander of the city of Paysandú for a short time, but was expelled by Servando Gómez. For a long time, Paysandú would be an important bastion of the Blanco Party. The Governor of Entre Ríos, Justo José de Urquiza, confiscated all the assets he had in the province under his control. In 1848, when Rivera fell, he fled to Brazil.

He joined the Army of Urquiza and fought in the Battle of Caseros on February 3, 1852. He remained in Buenos Aires and joined the Revolution of 11 September 1852. In November of that year, he led one of the two Buenos Aires columns that attacked Entre Ríos. Hornos along with Juan Madariaga managed to disrupt the Santa Fe constitutional convention. Hornos then managed to reach the outskirts of Concepción del Uruguay, where he was defeated by students from the college of that city. He retreated to Corrientes, where Governor Juan Gregorio Pujol, who had promised aid to the invasion shortly before, forced him to surrender and be disarmed. He went to Brazil and re-embarked for Buenos Aires. He was appointed commanding general of the province.

An army under General Jerónimo Costa invaded Buenos Aires from Santa Fe. Hornos came out to cross him before he could join the committed federal gauchos, and defeated him on November 8, 1854, on the El Tala River. Later he went on to fight with the Native Americans, as a commander of the southern border but proved to be incompetent during this.

He fought in the Battle of Cepeda and the Battle of Pavón, as chief of the Buenos Aires cavalry. After the last battle, with the cavalry he saved from disaster, he barricaded himself in Pergamino, where the Federalists came looking for him. When he was about to be defeated, the news of Urquiza's withdrawal arrived. He was the head of the cavalry that entered Rosario shortly after. He tried to convince President Bartolomé Mitre to invade Entre Ríos, but Mitre disavowed him since Urquiza would tacitly let Mitre invade the entire country, in exchange for being left in peace in Entre Ríos.

At the outbreak of the Paraguayan War, he was the cavalry commander of the advanced division and participated in almost all the important battles. He excelled in the crucial victory at the Battle of Tuyutí in November 1867, earning him promotion to the rank of general.

In 1870, he joined the forces returning from the war with Paraguay to confront Ricardo López Jordán's revolution in Entre Ríos. He participated in a secondary role in several battles, since the national cavalry could not against the efficient riders from Entre Ríos. Due to poor health he went into retirement at the end of 1870. After the defeat of López Jordán, he settled in Concepción del Uruguay before spending the rest of his life at Buenos Aires, dedicated to running horse races for bets.

He was initially buried in La Recoleta Cemetery, with Bartolomé Mitre giving the funeral speech. By Law 3058, on October 2, 1907, land was donated to him in the La Plata Cemetery, in which a vault was erected, to which in 1915 his remains were transferred with the reason for this transfer being unknown.
