= Joaquín Madariaga =

Argentine politician (1799–1848)

Joaquín Madariaga (1799 in Corrientes – 1848) was a soldier and Argentine politician. Madariaga was Governor of the Corrientes Province and leader of the provinces resistance against the national government of Juan Manuel de Rosas.

== The Revolution of Madariaga ==
Madariaga was a soldier from a young age in the city of Buenos Aires, and participated in the events known as the 'Anarchy of 1820'. He returned in 1824 to Corrientes, where he worked as a lawyer without having qualified as one and became a judge in the provincial capital.

Years later, he relocated to Curuzú Cuatiá, where he dedicated himself to rural work. He was a deputy in the Provincial Legislature during the governorship of Genaro Berón de Astrada and after the governor's death he supported the revolution that overthrew the federal governor Romero. Pedro Ferré named Joaquín's brother, Juan Madariaga, as commander of Mercedes and Curuzú Cuatiá. He helped Juan Lavalle form the army with which he conducted the campaign of Entre Rios in 1840.

Upon the arrival of José Maria Paz in Corrientes, he participated in the campaign against the first invasion of the Governor of Entre Ríos, Pascual Echagüe. Alongside his brother, Juan fought in the Battle of Caaguazú, Paz's most brilliant victory. In 1842 they were defeated in the Battle of Arroyo Grande. They retreated toward Corrientes but they were denied by the Ferré government, forcing them to retreat to their ranches to save their family and property. From there they fled to Brazil, residing for some time in Alegrete.

On April 1, 1843, the Madariaga brothers and some more officials crossed the Uruguay River near Uruguaiana, on what would later be known as the 'Paso de los Libres'. With the support of some leaders like Nicanor Cáceres and Benjamín Virasoro, within thirteen days they occupied the entire province, forcing Governor Pedro Cabral to flee toward the Entre Ríos. The last federal resistance was defeated at the beginning of May in the battle of Laguna Brava.

== Campaigns against Rosas ==
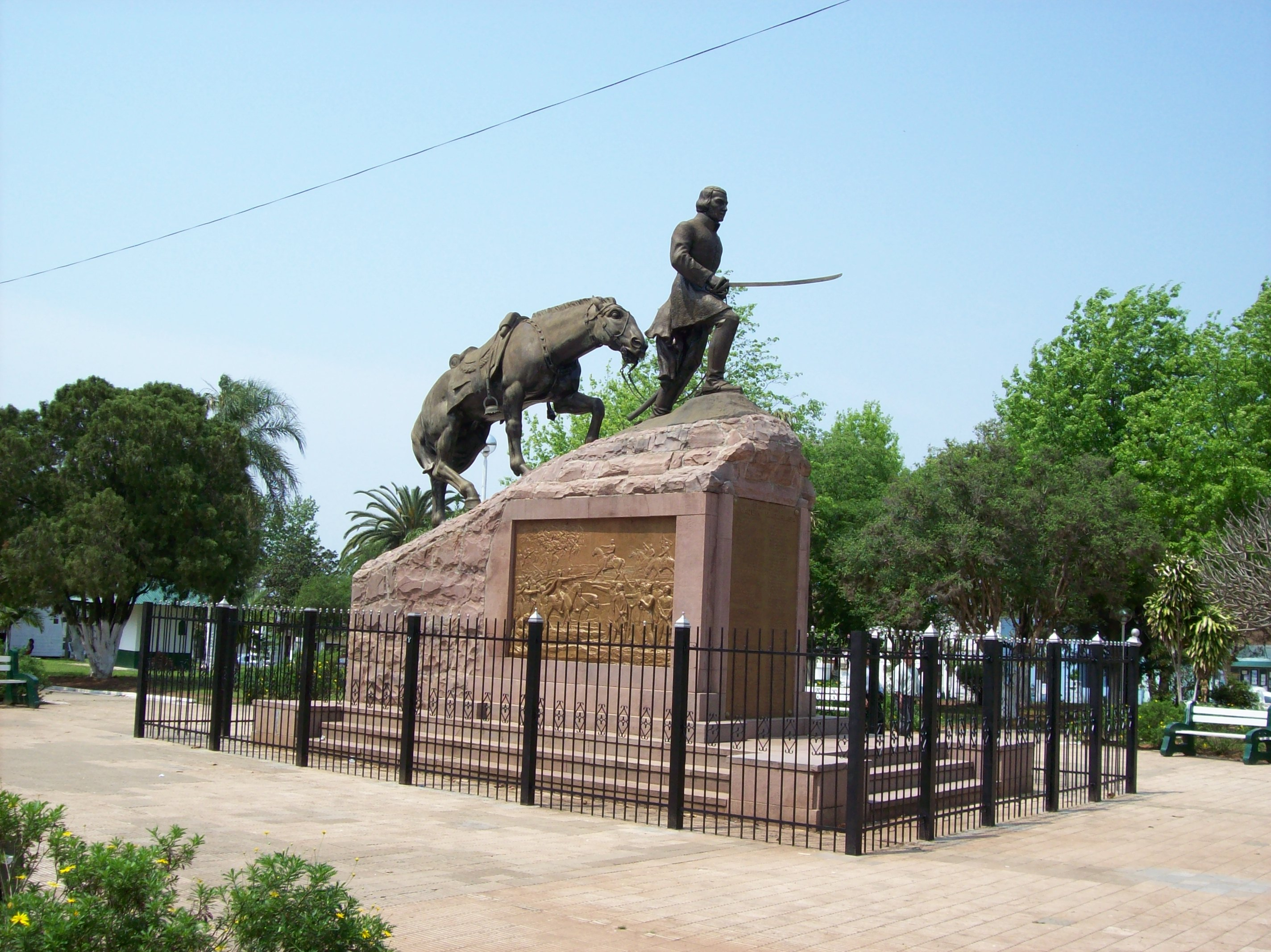
Monument to Madariaga in Paso de los Libres

The Madariaga brothers convened a supportive legislature that named Joaquín Madariaga as governor. He assumed that position August 1, 1843. His first measure was to annul any measures enacted by Cabral, and sanction Ferré for having abandoned the province.

He formed a unitarian party distinct from that which had supported Ferré among which were Juan Pujol, Valdez and Acosta; later, this would be the base of the liberal party, and their opponents, such as the supporters of Ferré and Virasoro, would become the autonomist party.

In December 1843, both brothers invaded Entre Ríos, taking advantage that Urquiza was in Uruguay pursuing Rivera. The Entrerrianan reserve of Eugenio Garzón was defeated, but upon arriving at Concepción del Uruguay they learned that Urquiza had defeated Rivera and was returning. The retreat that followed transformed into a flight and they lost all they had gained.

Just after returning to Corrientes, it confiscated a Paraguayan shipment that sailed through the Parana River. The government of Carlos Antonio López was about to declare war but Santiago Derqui was able to negotiate a peace treaty, a navigation and commerce treaty and a little later an alliance against the Rosas.

In November 1844 General Paz arrived at Corrientes, and immediately, Madariaga put him in control of the provincial forces. The General dedicated many months to training the inexperienced troops. In June 1845 he sent an expedition to Santa Fe under former Governor Juan Pablo López's command, though without success.

At the beginning of the following year, a force of 3,000 Paraguayans was established under the control of the son of the current president and future president Francisco Solano López. A little later, Urquiza invaded Corrientes and both defeated and took Juan Madariaga prisoner at Laguna Limpia. He did not try to attack the defensive positions of Paz but rather turned back. He promptly set free the brother of the governor and signed a peace treaty.

General Paz decided to overthrow the Madariaga brothers. To his surprise, the troops remained loyal and he had to flee to Paraguay. President Lopez retired his army and cancelled the alliance.

== Potrero de Vences ==
Free from the arrogance of Paz, the negotiations advanced rapidly, and in August 1846 the Treaty of Alcaraz was signed. Through this Corrientes was reincorporated in the Confederation and the control of foreign relations was given back to Rosas; however, Corrientes was released from the obligation to support the Great War in Uruguay. Rosas demanded modifications to the treaty but they were rejected by Madariaga.

In March of the following year, Rosas ordered Urquiza to attack Madariaga in Corrientes. Colonel Virasora joined the forces with Urquiza in the invasion that began by the end of that year. On November 27, 1847, Urquiza shredded the Corrientian army controlled by the Madriaga brothers in the Battle of Vences or the Potrero de Vences. The Corrientians suffered 700 deaths and 2,200 prisoners, many of whom were executed after the battle.

The following day, Colonel Miguel Virasoro occupied the government that he would leave to general Benjamín Madariaga one month later. Almost alone, the ex governor Madariaga fled to Paraguay and directed himself to Asunción, where he planned to drag President López into the war against Rosas. He failed and went to Porto Alegre, Brazil, where he died in February 1848.

== Sources ==
- Castello, Antonio Emilio, Hombres y mujeres de Corrientes, Ed. Moglia, Corrientes, 2004.
- Beverina, Juan, Las campañas de los ejércitos libertadores 1838-1852, Bs. As., 1923.
- Bosch, Beatriz, Urquiza y su tiempo.
- Castello, Antonio Emilio, Historia de Corrientes, Ed. Plus Ultra, Bs. As., 1991.
- Bosch, Beatriz, Historia de Entre Ríos, Ed. Plus Ultra, Bs. As., 1991.
- Zinny, Antonio, Historia de los gobernadores de las Provincias Argentinas, Ed, Hyspamérica, 1987.
