= Battle of Caaguazú =

- Part of the Argentine Civil War
Date	28 November 1841
Location	Near the Corriente River in Corrientes Province, Argentina
Result	Unitarian Party victory

Belligerents
Army of Corrientes Province for the Unitarian Party	Federal army

Commanders and leaders
José María Paz	Pascual Echagüe

Strength
3,000	5,000

The Battle of Caaguazú took place in Mercedes Department, in Corrientes Province, Argentina on 28 November 1841, during the Argentine Civil War, between the forces of Entre Ríos Province, commanded by brigadier Pascual Echagüe and Corrientes Province, under brigadier José María Paz, with a sound defeat of the Federal Party forces of Entre Ríos.

== Precedents ==
Since 1839 Corrientes Province had rebelled against the Buenos Aires Province dictator Juan Manuel de Rosas. The conflicts between Corrientes and Buenos Aires were overshadowed by the terms requested by the contenders. Corrientes demanded the sanctioning of a new constitution, while Rosas accused the Corrientes government of being run by the Unitarian Party. The governor of Corrientes was a federal like Rosas, but the province was allied with the Unitarian generals Juan Lavalle and José María Paz.

The real discussion was about the Customs House of the port of the city of Buenos Aires. They took the income from Customs duties and benefited from it, without giving due share to the other provinces, and having an open business policy that was ruining the local industries in the provinces. The provinces most affected by this policy were the ones with ports on the Paraná River, but Santa Fe and Entre Ríos were firmly allied with Buenos Aires; which made Corrientes fight alone on the defense of the "riverine federalism".

In 1839, then-governor Genaro Berón de Astrada had rebelled against the city of Buenos Aires, but a quick attack from the forces of Entre Rios governor Echagüe, had defeated him at the battle of Pago Largo, having Berón de Astrada paid with his life for the rebellion.

After a short-lived federal party government, brigadier Pedro Ferré was elected to succeed them. Ferré was a political enemy of Rosas since 1832, when Rosas had caused the failure of his opportunity to defeat the Unitarians trying to organize the constitution of the nation.

Ferré had put his provincial army under the command of general Lavalle, but the latter had invaded Entre Ríos and had taken the army to invade Buenos Aires, leaving the province defenseless. To make matters worse, he had been defeated and had to retreat to the northwest.

Ferré put all the remaining resources of the province under General José María Paz, who had a long Unitarian history. Paz worked on organizing and training the new army, to put it in combat conditions. He was lucky that Echagüe did not attack until the year 1840, because Lavalle had taken Santa Fe for a few weeks.

== The battle ==
After learning of the defeat of Lavalle at the Battle of Famaillá, Echagüe marched to the north. Paz had increased the size of his army with fleeing soldiers from Lavalle's, and Ferré had signed an alliance with Santa Fe's governor, brigadier Juan Pablo López.

Echagüe stayed in the south of the province for several weeks, reaching the Corriente River and waiting for the opportunity to attack with an advantage. Paz did not give him that chance, and crossed the river at the Caaguazú pass.

At the start of the battle, Echagüe had more than 5,000 men (1,000 of them infantry) and 12 artillery pieces, under the command of Colonel Servando Gómez and other experienced officers, but he did not have the best of his generals, brigadier Justo José de Urquiza. Paz's forces, of about 3,000 men were commanded by less-capable officers, with the only experienced officer, who had fought in the War of Independence, Colonel Indalecio Chenaut. Among the Corrientes army's officers they would distinguish themselves the future governors, lieutenant colonels Joaquín Madariaga and Benjamín Virasoro.

Paz awaited the attack in a seemingly weak position: his cavalry on the left flank retreated at the first attack by the forces commanded by Gómez, and were chased for a few kilometers. But as they were advancing, they were surrounding themselves by the Corriente River and a swamp, and being shot at from the riverside by the Corrientes' infantry. Upon reaching the end, they were met by the infantry and artillery concentrated together and was defeated. They had to retreat and along the way they were shot at again effectively by the enemy's infantry in both flanks.

The Corrientes cavalry attacked on the right flank, under General Manuel Ramírez, and defeated the demoralized and weakened forces he confronted. The chase of the Federal cavalry pushed Echagüe, who was close to being shot to death. His infantry, lacking cavalry's protection, had to retreat; but several leagues distant, tired and thirsty, they surrendered. The artillery under Colonel Juan Bautista Thorne was the only force that acquitted themselves on the Federal side, but they had to finally surrender as the infantry had.

The Corrientes army had 53 dead, while the Entre Rios army lost 1,350 dead and 800 prisoners, plus all their artillery, supplies and infantry weapons.

== Consequences ==
The battle of Caaguazú was the last and most brilliant victory of General Paz. Argentina's entire littoral was left open for the advance of Corrientes forces, which were now made stronger by the captured weaponry.

Paz quickly advanced towards Entre Ríos and took the city of Paraná. Upon reaching Paraná, the differences between Paz and Ferré became serious and Paz was left by himself, with control only of the prisoners of Caaguazú. A little while later, Juan Pablo López was defeated in Santa Fe, and was replaced by Echagüe. Paz attempted to retreat to the east, and join with his ally brigadier general Fructuoso Rivera; but the ex-prisoners he had as soldiers deserted and joined the forces of Urquiza coming from Buenos Aires. Paz arrived alone to Concepción del Uruguay, where he refused to be out under the orders of Rivera.

In the meantime, el brigadier general Manuel Oribe a rival of Rivera, crossed the Paraná River and advanced along Urquiza to the east, where he would defeat Rivera at the Battle of Arroyo Grande. That Federal victory signified the fall of all the opposition to Rosas in the whole country, including Corrientes.

Two years later, the Madariaga brothers would revolt against Rosas again in Corrientes province, and would again put their army in general Paz's hands, but their final defeat in 1847 gave absolute control of the country to Buenos Aires governor, Rosas.

== Bibliography ==
- Castello, Antonio Emilio (1991). Historia de Corrientes. Buenos Aires: Plus Ultra. ISBN 950-21-0619-9.
- Castello, Antonio Emilio (2004). Hombres y mujeres de Corrientes. Corrientes: Moglia. ISBN 987-1035-30-6.
- Paz, José María (1988). Memorias póstumas. Corrientes: Hyspamérica. ISBN 950-614-762-0.
- Ferré, Pedro (1921). Memorias. Coni Hnos.
- Díaz, César (1968). Memorias. Montevideo: Biblioteca Artigas.
- Beverina, Juan (1923). Las campañas de los ejércitos libertadores 1838–1852. Buenos Aires.
- Bosch, Beatriz (1991). Historia de Entre Ríos. Buenos Aires: Plus Ultra. ISBN 950-21-0108-1.
