= Paso de los Libres =

- City
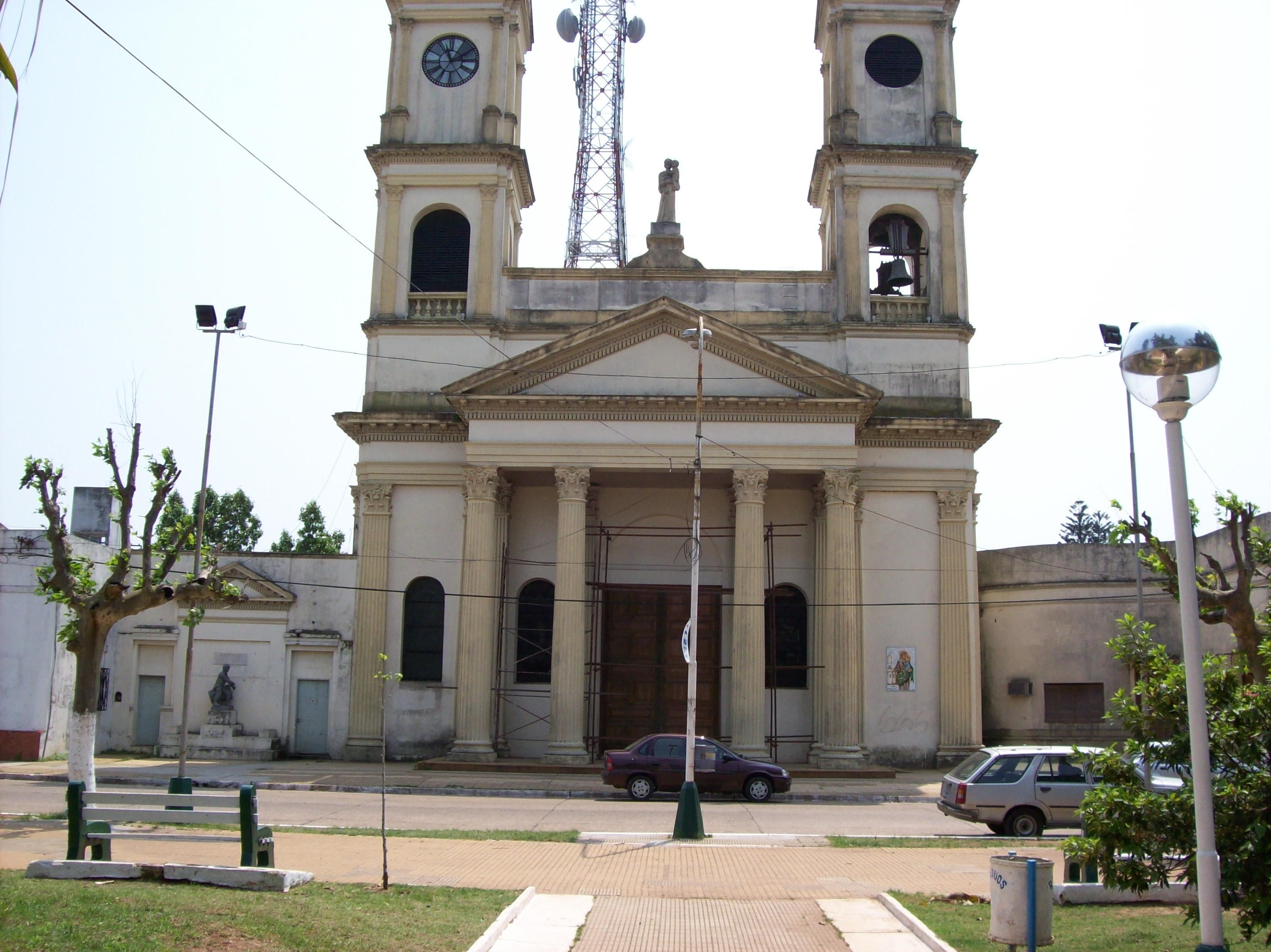
- San José Church, Paso de los Libres

- Location of Paso de los Libres in Argentina
- Coordinates: 29°43′S 57°5′W
- Country: Argentina
- Province: Corrientes
- Department: Paso de los Libres
- Foundation: September 12, 1843
- Founder: Joaquín Madariaga

Government
  - Mayor: Martín Ascúa (Frente de Todos (PJ))

Population (2010 census)
  - Total: 43,251
- Demonym: libreño/a
- Time zone: UTC−3 (ART)
- CPA base: W3320
- Dialing code: +54 3772

Paso de los Libres is a city in the east of the province of Corrientes in the Argentine Mesopotamia. It had about 44,000 inhabitants at the 2010 census [INDEC], and is the head town of the department of the same name. The city is on the right-hand (western) shore of the Uruguay River, opposite the city of Uruguaiana, Rio Grande do Sul, Brazil, to which it is joined by a road and railway bridge (Paso de los Libres-Uruguaiana International Bridge). The area is served by Paso de los Libres Airport.

== Climate ==
Climate data for Paso de los Libres (1991–2020, extremes 1961–present)
Month	Jan	Feb	Mar	Apr	May	Jun	Jul	Aug	Sep	Oct	Nov	Dec	Year
Record high °C (°F)	42.5 (108.5)	41.8 (107.2)	39.6 (103.3)	36.7 (98.1)	34.4 (93.9)	31.5 (88.7)	31.4 (88.5)	35.9 (96.6)	36.4 (97.5)	38.3 (100.9)	41.6 (106.9)	42.0 (107.6)	42.5 (108.5)
Mean daily maximum °C (°F)	32.2 (90.0)	31.1 (88.0)	29.5 (85.1)	26.0 (78.8)	21.8 (71.2)	19.6 (67.3)	19.0 (66.2)	21.8 (71.2)	23.2 (73.8)	25.8 (78.4)	28.6 (83.5)	31.0 (87.8)	25.8 (78.4)
Daily mean °C (°F)	26.0 (78.8)	25.1 (77.2)	23.4 (74.1)	20.1 (68.2)	16.4 (61.5)	14.2 (57.6)	13.4 (56.1)	15.4 (59.7)	17.2 (63.0)	20.2 (68.4)	22.6 (72.7)	24.9 (76.8)	19.9 (67.8)
Mean daily minimum °C (°F)	20.6 (69.1)	20.0 (68.0)	18.4 (65.1)	15.4 (59.7)	12.1 (53.8)	10.1 (50.2)	9.0 (48.2)	10.3 (50.5)	12.2 (54.0)	15.2 (59.4)	16.9 (62.4)	19.2 (66.6)	14.9 (58.8)
Record low °C (°F)	10.2 (50.4)	8.7 (47.7)	5.5 (41.9)	3.2 (37.8)	−0.3 (31.5)	−4.0 (24.8)	−3.5 (25.7)	−3.0 (26.6)	0.2 (32.4)	2.8 (37.0)	6.0 (42.8)	8.1 (46.6)	−4.0 (24.8)
Average precipitation mm (inches)	143.9 (5.67)	144.4 (5.69)	148.9 (5.86)	180.4 (7.10)	125.4 (4.94)	88.9 (3.50)	68.2 (2.69)	57.0 (2.24)	91.7 (3.61)	173.0 (6.81)	134.2 (5.28)	161.7 (6.37)	1,517.7 (59.75)
Average precipitation days (≥ 0.1 mm)	7.6	7.9	7.4	8.3	8.1	7.6	6.7	5.7	7.6	9.7	7.5	8.0	92.1
Average relative humidity (%)	69.7	72.5	74.6	77.5	81.5	82.6	79.7	74.9	73.2	73.5	68.4	68.1	74.7
Mean monthly sunshine hours	248.0	209.1	189.1	174.0	151.9	120.0	155.0	170.5	144.0	182.9	243.0	244.9	2,232.4
Mean daily sunshine hours	8.0	7.4	6.1	5.8	4.9	4.0	5.0	5.5	4.8	5.9	8.1	7.9	6.1
Percentage possible sunshine	56	56	47	51	54	43	40	45	34	48	52	50	48
Source 1: Servicio Meteorológico Nacional
Source 2: UNLP (percent sun only 1971–1980)

== Consular representation ==
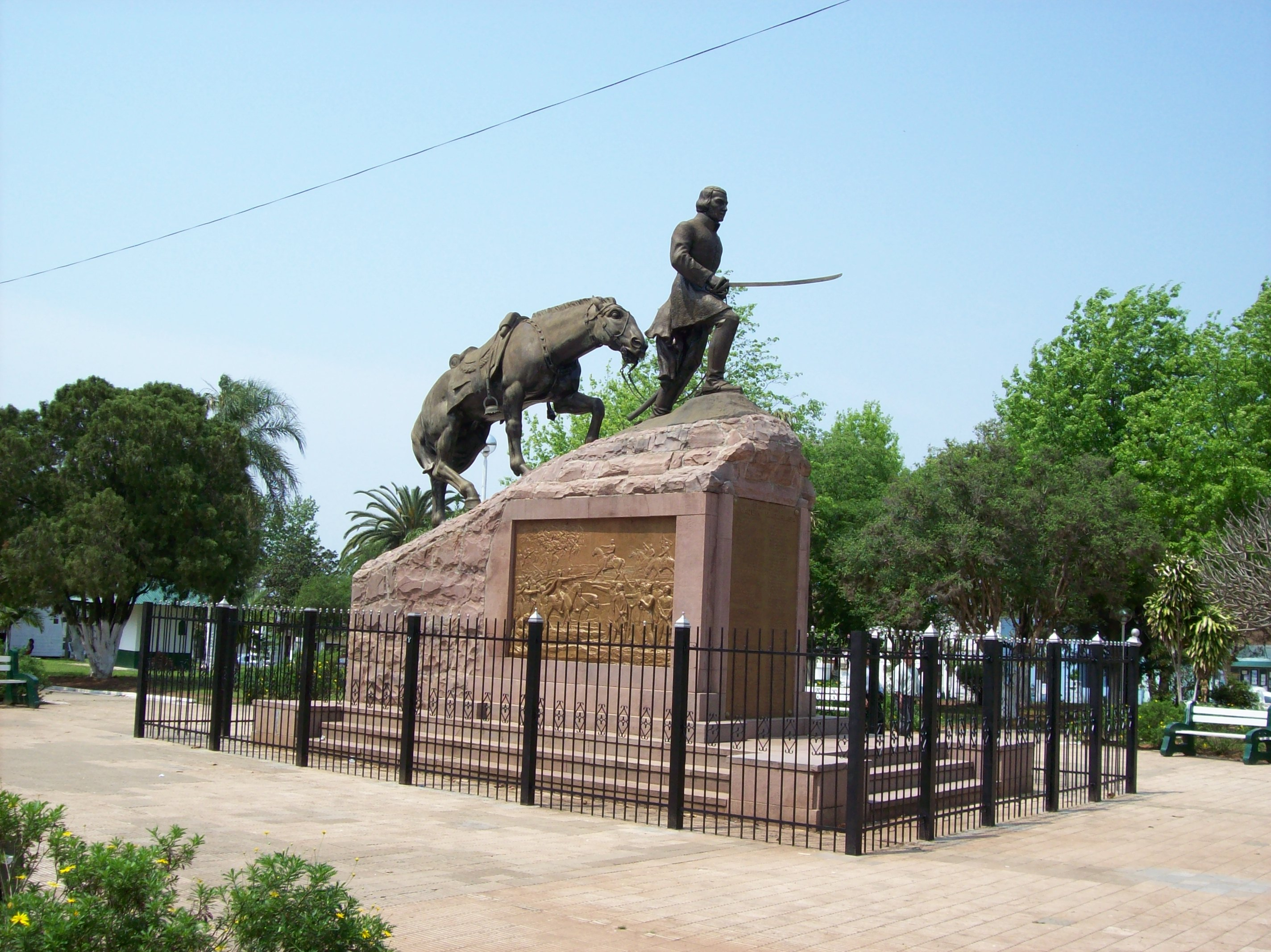
Monument to General Joaquín Madariaga and the 108 Valiants

Brazil has a Consulate in Paso de los Libres.

== Notable people ==
- Aimé Bonpland (1773–1858), French explorer and botanist who travelled in South America, died in Paso de los Libres.

== See also ==
- Domingo Cabred
