= Juan Madariaga =

Argentine general

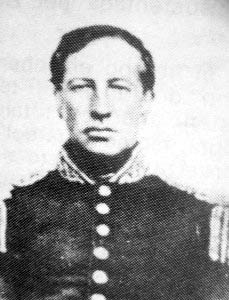

Juan Madariaga (November 15, 1809 – June 29, 1879) was an Argentine general who participated in the civil wars of the nineteenth century. He was married to Carmen Piran Riglos, the daughter of Ana Estefanía Dominga Riglos.
