= Federalist =

Set of political beliefs

The term federalist describes several political beliefs around the world. It may also refer to the concept of parties, whose members or supporters call themselves Federalists.

== History ==
=== Europe federation ===
In Europe, proponents of deeper European integration are sometimes called Federalists. A major European NGO and advocacy group campaigning for such a political union is the Union of European Federalists. Movements towards a peacefully unified European state have existed since the 1920s, notably the Paneuropean Union. Volt Europa, a European political alliance with representation in the European Parliament, supports this cause.

In the European Parliament, the Spinelli Group brings together MEPs from different political groups to work together of ideas and projects of European federalism; taking their name from Italian politician and MEP Altiero Spinelli, who himself was a major proponent of European federalism, also meeting with fellow deputies in the Crocodile Club.

Notable European Federalists are former European Commission president Jean-Claude Juncker, current EC president Ursula von der Leyen, leader of ALDE group Guy Verhofstadt, German Federal Minister for Economic Affairs and Energy of Germany Peter Altmaier, German MEP Elmar Brok and the former leader of the SPD Martin Schulz.

=== Latin America ===
In the Spanish-speaking parts of Latin America, the term "federalist" is used in reference to the politics of 19th-century Argentina and Colombia. The Federalists opposed the Unitarians in Argentina and the Centralists in Colombia through the 19th century. Federalists fought for complete self-government and full provincial autonomy, as opposed to the centralized government that the Unitarians and Centralists favored. Furthermore, Federalists demanded tariff protection for their industries and, in Argentina, called for the end of the Buenos Aires customs as the only intermediary for foreign trade. During the Federal War (1859-1863) in Venezuela, liberal caudillos confronted conservatives, leading to the establishment of the modern federal States of Venezuela.

=== Argentina ===
The one Federalist leader in the Platine Region was José Gervasio Artigas, who opposed the centralist governments in Buenos Aires that followed the May Revolution, and created instead the Federal League in 1814 among several Argentine Provinces and the Banda Oriental (modern-day Uruguay). In 1819, the Federal armies rejected the centralist Constitution of the United Provinces of South America and defeated the forces of Supreme Director José Rondeau at the 1820 Battle of Cepeda, effectively ending the central government and securing Provinces' sovereignty through a series of inter-Provincial pacts (v.g. Treaty of Pilar, Treaty of Benegas, Quadrilateral Treaty). A new National Constitution was proposed only in 1826, during the Presidency of Unitarian Bernardino Rivadavia, but it was again rejected by the Provinces, leading to the dissolution of the National Government the following year.

Federalist Buenos Aires Governor Manuel Dorrego took over the management of the foreign affairs of the United Provinces, but he was deposed and executed in 1828 by Unitarian General Juan Lavalle, who commanded troops dissatisfied with the negotiations that ended the War with Brazil. The following year, Juan Manuel de Rosas, leader of Buenos Aires Federalists, defeated Lavalle and secured his resignation. Rosas was elected Governor of Buenos Aires later that year by the Provincial Legislature. To counteract these developments, the Unitarian League was created by General José María Paz in 1830, uniting nine Argentine Provinces. The 1831 Federal Pact between Buenos Aires, Entre Ríos and Santa Fe Provinces opposed a military alliance to the League and ultimately defeated it during 1832, its former members joining the Federal Pact into a loose confederation of Provinces known as the Argentine Confederation. Although the Unitarians were exiled in neighboring countries, the Civil War continued for two decades.

Buenos Aires Governor Juan Manuel de Rosas exerted a growing hegemony over the rest of the country during his 1835-1852 Government and resisted several Unitarian uprisings, but was finally defeated in 1852 by a coalition Army gathered by Entre Ríos Federalist Governor Justo José de Urquiza, who accused Rosas of not complying with Federal Pact provisions for a National Constitution. In 1853, a Federal Constitution was enacted (the current Constitution of Argentina, through amendments) and Urquiza was elected President of the Argentine Confederation. However, on the aftermath of 1852 Battle of Caseros, the Province of Buenos Aires had seceded from the Confederation. In 1859, after the Battle of Cepeda the State of Buenos Aires rejoined the Confederation, although it was granted the right to make some amendments to its Constitution. Finally, after the 1861 Battle of Pavón, Buenos Aires took over the Confederation.

The following federal governments fought the weaker Federalist and Autonomist resistances in the countryside until the 1870s. The last Autonomist rebellion in Buenos Aires was quelled in 1880, leading to the federalization of Buenos Aires city and the stabilization of the Argentine State and government through the National Autonomist Party.

=== North America ===
==== Quebec ====
Federalism, in regard to the National Question, refers to support for Quebec remaining within Canada, while either keeping the status quo or pursuing greater autonomy and constitutional recognition of a Quebec nation, with corresponding rights and powers for Quebec within the Canadian federation. This ideology is opposed to Quebec sovereigntism, proponents of Quebec independence, most often (but not for all followers) along with an economic union with Canada similar to the European Union.

==== United States ====
In the United States the term federalist usually applies to a member of one of the following groups:

- Statesmen and public figures supporting the proposed Constitution of the United States between 1787 and 1789. The most prominent advocates were James Madison, Alexander Hamilton, and John Jay. They published The Federalist Papers, which expounded the principles of the early federalist movement to promote and adopt the proposed Constitution.
- Statesmen and public figures supporting the administrations of presidents George Washington (1789–1797) and John Adams (1797–1801). They became the Federalist Party, founded by Alexander Hamilton. During the 1790s and early 1800s, the Federalist Party opposed the Democratic-Republican Party (founded by Thomas Jefferson and James Madison) over issues of how broadly or narrowly to apply the provisions of the new Constitution.

The Federalist Society for Law and Public Policy Studies is an organization of conservative and libertarian lawyers and others dedicated to debate of these principles.

== Global federalism ==
The World Federalist Movement is a global citizens movement that advocates for strengthened and democratic world institutions subjected to the federalist principles of subsidiarity, solidarity and democracy. It states that "[w]orld federalists support the creation of democratic global structures accountable to the citizens of the world and call for the division of international authority among separate agencies".

== See also ==
- Anti-Federalism
- Confederation
- Federal (disambiguation)
- Federalism
- Federalist Era
- Federalist Party
- Federation
- World Federation
