= Decembrist revolution (Argentina) =

1828 military coup in the Buenos Aires Province

- Part of the Argentine Civil Wars
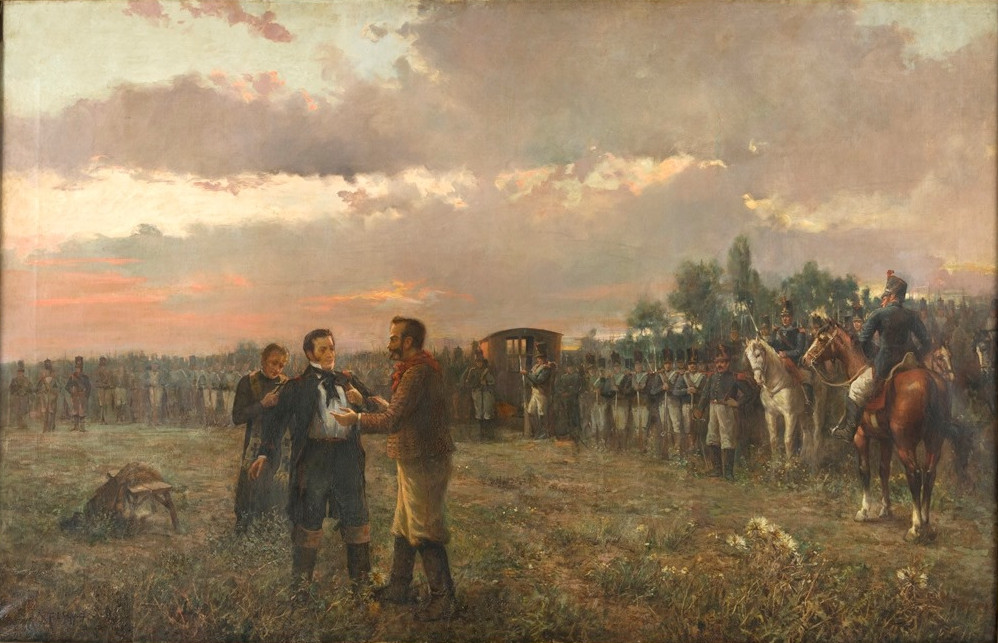
- Execution of Manuel Dorrego
| Date | 1828–1831 |
| Location | Argentina |
| Result | Federal victory |

Belligerents
| Federales | Unitarians |

Commanders and leaders
| Manuel Dorrego (executed); Juan M. de Rosas; Estanislao López; Facundo Quiroga | Juan Lavalle; José M. Paz (POW); G. Aráoz de Lamadrid |

The Decembrist revolution (Spanish: Revolución decembrina) was a military coup in the Buenos Aires Province, Argentina. Juan Lavalle, returning with the troops that fought in the Cisplatine War, mounted a coup on December 1, 1828, capturing and killing the governor Manuel Dorrego and ultimately closing the legislature. The rancher Juan Manuel de Rosas organized militias that fought against Lavalle and removed him from power, restoring the legislature. However, as the coup had reignited the Argentine Civil Wars, Rosas was appointed governor of the Buenos Aires province to wage the war against the Unitarian League. Both José María Paz, from Córdoba, and Rosas formed a league of provinces. The conflict ended soon after the unexpected capture of Paz, when he mistook enemy troops for his own.

== Context ==
The Argentine Civil Wars began during the Argentine War of Independence. The conflict was between the federals, who wanted to organize the country as a federation, and the unitarians, who preferred a centralist government with a capital in Buenos Aires. Following the 1820 battle of Cepeda, a constituent assembly was convened to write a new constitution and organize the country. The provinces rejected the 1826 constitution because of its centralist tendencies, and the unitarian president Bernardino Rivadavia resigned. The provinces became a confederation once more, and federal Manuel Dorrego was appointed governor of Buenos Aires.

The Banda Oriental had been conquered and annexed by Portugal, which renamed it as Cisplatina; the Portuguese colonies in South America declared their independence and became the Empire of Brazil shortly after. Argentina and Brazil began the Argentine-Brazilian War for the control of the province. The peace treaty declared it an independent country, the modern nation of Uruguay, which was resented by the Argentine military that fought in the conflict.

== Coup ==
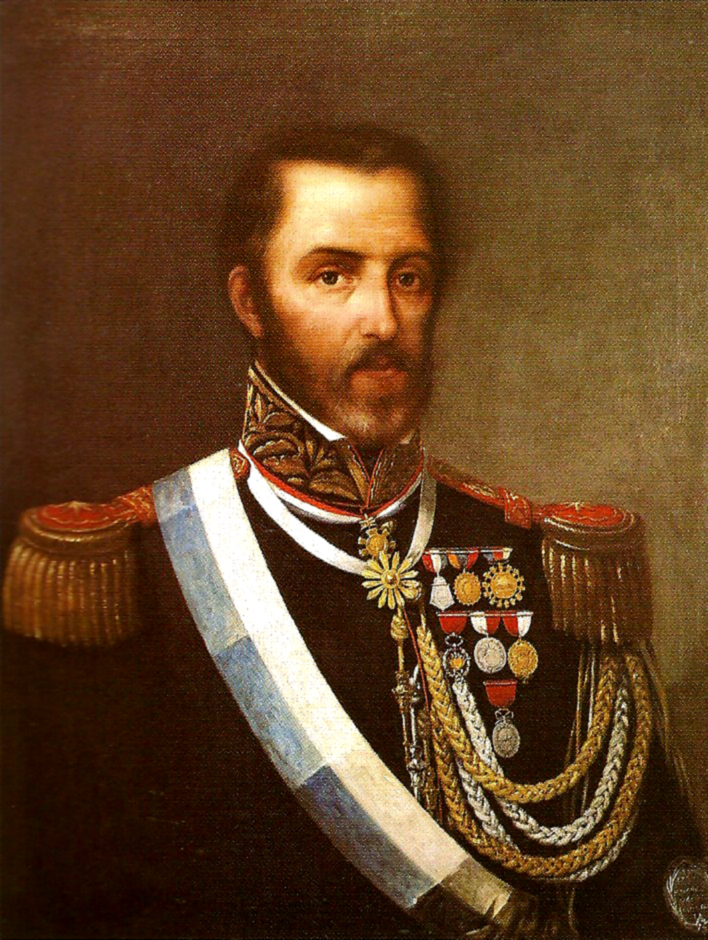
Juan Lavalle, leader of the coup

General Juan Lavalle was initially neither federalist nor unitarian, but after his return began to be influenced by the unitarians, who tried to win him for their side. The bulk of the army arrived to Buenos Aires on November 26, in bad shape: they lacked food and clothing, had not been paid for months, and resented the peace treaty. There were rumors in the city that the army would revolt against the governor Dorrego, but he initially dismissed them. The leaders of the revolution met on December 1 to organize the coup, and Dorrego began to be concerned. However, according to the memoirs of Tomás de Iriarte, the minister Tomás Guido prevented the government from organizing a proper resistance. Lavalle's forces gathered in La Recoleta, and began to march at 3:30 in the morning, once he obtained horses for the cavalry. The admiral William Brown supported the operation and prepared a naval siege of the fort (modern Casa Rosada), but it was not needed. Lacking any means of defense, Dorrego escaped to the countryside. A group of soldiers occupied the Buenos Aires Cabildo and another secured the police. It was unclear if the Fort would begin a resistance, but once the departure of Dorrego was known, the revolutionaries claimed victory and played a military march.

The disputes between the revolutionaries began immediately: Lavalle had promised to be just the military leader of the operation, but now he sought to be appointed governor. A vote set up in the Cabildo by the military, attended only by supporters of the coup, proclaimed Lavalle interim governor, and the military forces in the fort surrendered at 13:00, accepting Lavalle's rule. The Hall of Representatives, the legislature of Buenos Aires, was closed.

There was no active resistance in the city. Lacking leadership, several groups of federals left the city and sought the help of the rancher Juan Manuel de Rosas to coordinate the resistance against the coup. According to Iriarte's memoirs, Lavalle was informed that all the countryside was against the coup, so he appointed William Brown interim governor and left the city with 600 cuirassiers. Dorrego met with Rosas on December 6, and the unitarian Gregorio Aráoz de Lamadrid met them two days later, proposing peace negotiations. According to Lamadrid's memoirs, Rosas initially rejected the proposal, considering Lavalle an outlaw, but finally agreed to send delegates to negotiate.

Rosas and Dorrego did not agree on the military strategy. Dorrego wanted to head the forces to battle against the unitarians, and Rosas preferred to avoid an early battle, and retreat to the Santa Fe province to seek support from the federal governor Estanislao López and wait for the dispersed militias of the countryside to join them. Without an agreement, they divided their forces to pursue their own plans. Dorrego was defeated at the battle of Navarro, and then betrayed by his officers Bernardino Escribano and Mariano Acha, who defected from the federals to the unitarians and took him as a prisoner to Lavalle.

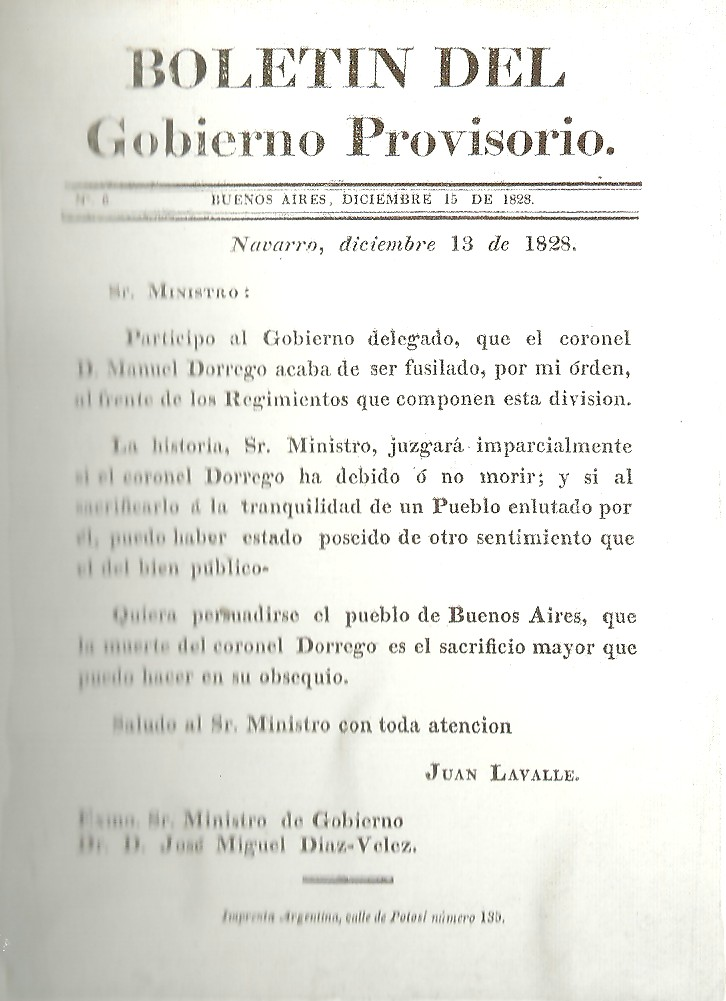
Report of Lavalle, announcing the execution of Dorrego

Dorrego was not sent to Buenos Aires for a trial. The unitarians Juan Cruz Varela and Salvador María del Carril wrote to Lavalle instructing him to execute Dorrego. Varela asked him to destroy the mails after reading them, but Lavalle kept them. Dorrego was executed in Navarro on December 13, 1828.

The execution of Dorrego generated a huge controversy in Buenos Aires. Varela wrote to Lavalle, instructing him to forge documents to make things seem as if he had conducted a trial in Navarro, but Lavalle kept this mail as well. The federals saw Dorrego as a martyr and strengthened their opposition to the military government. The National Convention in Santa Fe (the highest national authority at the time) denounced the coup and the execution of Dorrego as crimes of high treason, and appointed Estanislao López as the leader of troops to be sent to remove the government in Buenos Aires. The provinces of Córdoba and Entre Ríos joined the offensive, followed by the others. The government in Buenos Aires began a campaign of political repression against federals. Lavalle was soon reinforced by general José María Paz . The number of deaths caused by the political repression was so high that in 1829 Buenos Aires had more deaths than births.

José de San Martín returned from Europe at this time. When he learned of the resignation of his political enemy Rivadavia he sailed back to Buenos Aires, to take part in the war against Brazil. The end of the conflict, the Decembrist revolution and the execution of Dorrego took place during his journey: once in Buenos Aires, he was dismayed by the ongoing conflicts and did not leave the ship. Lavalle proposed him as the new governor of Buenos Aires, but he refused to take part in a civil war, and returned to Europe.

Lavalle and Paz moved their armies to Santa Fe and Córdoba respectively. López managed to force Lavalle to send his troops to a region rich in mío mío, a toxic grass: five hundred horses died, half of his cavalry. Lavalle attempted to return to Buenos Aires, and met Rosas and López at the battle of Márquez Bridge, where he was defeated. López returned to Santa Fe, because Paz had successfully conquered Córdoba and feared that his province may be next. Completely defeated, Lavalle headed unescorted to Rosas’ base of operations and requested a parley. It was late and Rosas was not there at the time, so he was allowed to sleep at Rosas’ bedroom. When he woke up, Rosas was next to his bed and offered him a mate. Lavalle, regretful of the execution of Dorrego, agreed to step down from power. They signed the Cañuelas Pact, calling for elections to a new legislature. Lavalle would stay as governor during the transition. They proposed an unified ballot, with both federal and unitarian candidates.

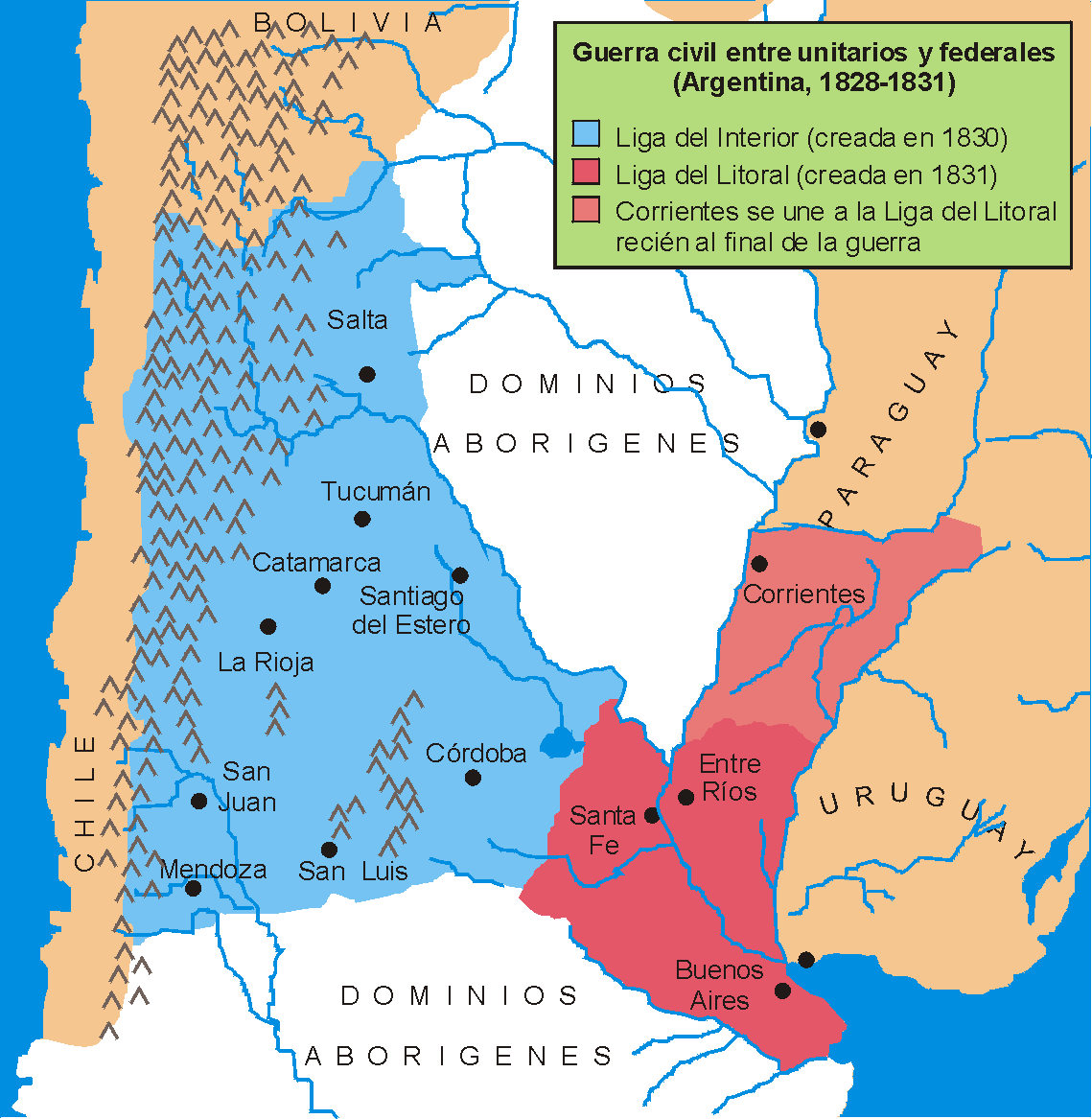
Map of the Unitarian (blue) and Federal (red) leagues

The unitarians rejected the pactand the action of Lavalle and proposed an alternative ballot, composed entirely of unitarians, and attempted to impose it with electoral fraud. Lavalle, in turn, rejected the unitarians that defied the pact, and called them "enemies of peace" in a mail to Rosas. Lavalle and Rosas began to write to each other, in friendly terms, trying to coordinate actions to end the conflict. Lavalle proposed to retire the most extreme federal candidates on the joint ballot and replace them with moderate unitarians. Nevertheless, unitarians rejected the proposal and imposed their own ballot. Federals prepared to renew the war, but it was not needed. To prevent further hostilities, Lavalle signed a new convention with Rosas. Instead of calling for elections to appoint a new legislature, they agreed to simply restore the old one, closed at the beginning of the decembrist revolution. Juan José Viamonte, a moderate federal, was appointed governor.

Lavalle left Buenos Aires and moved to Montevideo, Uruguay; many federals that were exiled or had left the country began to return. A group of federals, including Viamonte, wanted elections for a new legislature, but Rosas pointed that the terms of the deposed legislators had not ended and were not legally interrupted; his position prevailed. The legislature met on December 1, 1829, a year after the coup. However, although the unitarians had been defeated in Buenos Aires, Paz was still in control of Córdoba and defeated Quiroga at the battle of La Tablada. Colonel Smith attempted to mutiny and take his unit to Córdoba; while his attempt was thwarted, it generated great concern in the city. The legislature voted to release the sum of public power to the governor to deal with the crisis, as it had done with many governments in the city since 1811. Two days later they appointed Rosas the new definitive governor.

== Government of Rosas ==
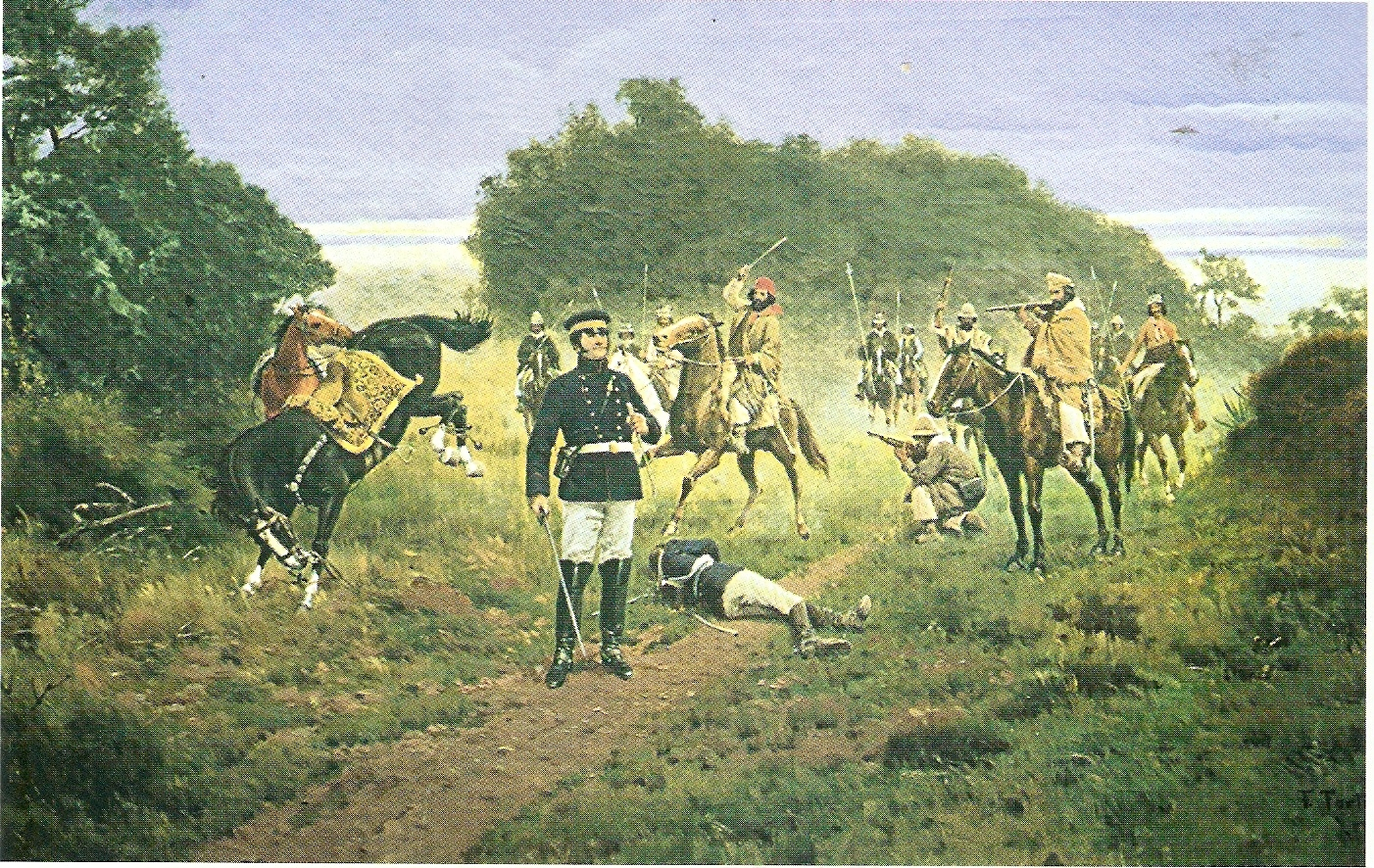
Capture of general José María Paz

The state funeral of Manuel Dorrego was held soon after Rosas became governor. He faced the military threat of José María Paz, who began a campaign against federals in Córdoba similar to the one of Lavalle. His actions were not limited to the province of Córdoba, and sent Gregorio Aráoz de Lamadrid to la Rioja and Roman Deheza to Santiago del Estero. Quiroga organized a new army and fought against Paz again, suffering a second defeat at the battle of Oncativo. The provinces under the influence of Paz would become the Unitarian League, Paz would style himself the Supreme Chief of the League. In the poor provinces far from Buenos Aires, both unitarians and federals had problems to maintain their armies. While Quiroga's army was larger, Paz's army was more professional and had additional needs. Both Paz and Rosas organized armies for the final conflict. Lavalle, Lamadrid and Martín Rodríguez attempted a coup in Entre Ríos, but failed. Buenos Aires, Santa Fe and Entre Ríos signed a defensive and offensive alliance, the Federal pact. The Corrientes province joined it several months later.

The military conflicts began in 1831. López headed to Córdoba with 2,000 men, Felipe Ibarra returned to Santiago del Estero from Santa Fe, Ángel Pacheco led the armies of Buenos Aires, and Quiroga moved to Cuyo (Mendoza, San Luis and San Juan). The initial conflicts proved favourable to the federals: Pacheco defeated the forces of Paz, Ibarra and Benito Villafañe liberated Santiago del Estero and Catamarca, there were local federal rebellions in Córdoba and La Rioja, and Quiroga liberated Mendoza. Still, the most unexpected event of the war was the capture of general Paz. He had dressed his soldiers as gauchos and, during a reconnaissance mission, confused the troops of López (composed by real gauchos) with his own; his horse was entangled and he was taken prisoner.

With the capture of Paz, the Unitarian League began to be defeated. López and Balcarce liberated Córdoba on June 11, and Quiroga headed to Tucumán. José Vicente Reinafé, close to Estanislao López, was appointed governor of Córdoba. All the provinces joined the Federal Pact upon their liberation: first Córdoba, Santiago del Estero, La Rioja and the three provinces of Cuyo between August and October, and Catamarca, Tucumán and Salta the following year.

== Bibliography ==
- Donghi, Tulio Halperin (2010). De la revolución de independencia a la Confederación Rosista (in Spanish). Argentina: Paidos. ISBN 978-950-12-7723-4.
- Gálvez, Manuel (2007). Vida de Juan Manuel de Rosas (in Spanish). Argentina: Claridad. ISBN 978-950-620-208-8.
