= Revolutions during the 1820s =

Revolutions during the 1820s included revolutions in Russia (Decembrist revolt), Spain, Portugal, and the Italian states for constitutional monarchies, and for independence from Ottoman rule in Greece. Unlike the revolutionary wave in the 1830s, these tended to take place in the peripheries of Europe.

== Timeline ==
- 1820: The Trienio Liberal in Spain
- 1820: the Liberal Revolution in Portugal
- 1820: the Kingdom of the Two Sicilies
- 1821 – 1829: Greek War of Independence
- 1821: the Kingdom of Sardinia
- 1825: the Decembrist revolt in Russia
- 1828: the Decembrist revolution in Argentina

== Europe ==
=== Italy ===
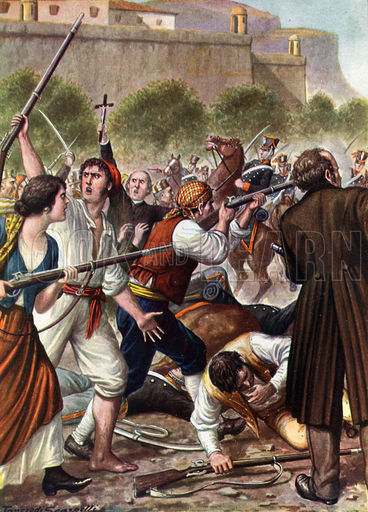
Palermo insurrection of 1820

The 1820 revolution began in Sicily and in Naples, against King Ferdinand I of the Two Sicilies, who was forced to make concessions and promise a constitutional monarchy. This success inspired Carbonari in the north of Italy to revolt too. In 1821, the Kingdom of Sardinia (Piedmont) forced King Victor Emmanuel I to abdicate and temporarily obtained a constitutional monarchy as a result of the Carbonari's actions, as well as other liberal reforms.

The Holy Alliance would not tolerate this state of affairs and decided in October 1820 to intervene. In February 1821, it sent an army to crush the revolution in Naples. The King of Sardinia also called for Austrian intervention. Faced with an enemy overwhelmingly superior in number, the Carbonari revolts collapsed and their leaders fled into exile.

=== Spain ===
Colonel Rafael del Riego led a large part of the Spanish army in a mutiny, demanding that the liberal constitution of 1812 be restored. King Ferdinand VII agreed, but secretly asked for aid from the Congress system which, in the Congress of Verona of 1822, agreed to have France send 100,000 troops, which promptly defeated Riego's forces and reinstalled an absolute monarchy. This period was known as the Trienio Liberal.

=== Portugal ===
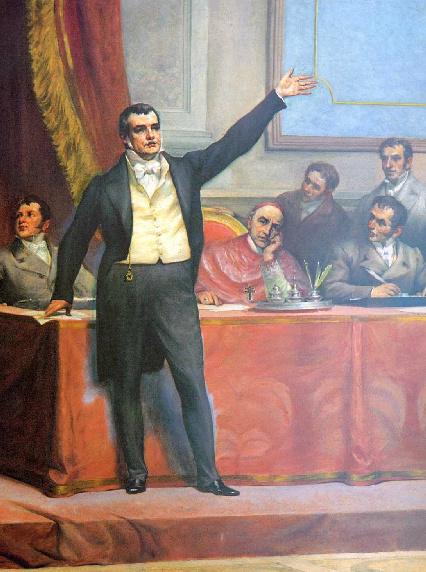
Manuel Fernandes Tomás gives a speech during the drafting of the first Portuguese Constitution.

The Liberal Revolution of 1820 began with a military insurrection in the city of Porto, in northern Portugal, that quickly and peacefully spread to the rest of the country. The Revolution resulted in the return in 1821 of the Portuguese Court to Portugal from Brazil, where its members had fled during the Peninsular War, and initiated a constitutional period in which the 1822 Constitution was ratified and implemented.

According to Kenneth Maxwell, "the important point about Brazil is that it became economically and politically emancipated between 1808 and 1820 while acting as the centre of the Luso-Brazilian Empire", meaning Brazil's independence was proclaimed after the nation had had an "imperial-like" experience.

"This unusual circumstance explains why in 1820 it was Portugal that declared independence from Brazil, and only afterwards, that Brazil declared its independence from Portugal", as one may read in the Manifesto issued by the rebels in Oporto in 1820:

"[...] The idea of the status of a colony to which Portugal in effect is reduced afflicts deeply all those citizens who still conserve a sentiment of national dignity. Justice is administered from Brazil to the loyal people in Europe [...]"

=== Greece ===
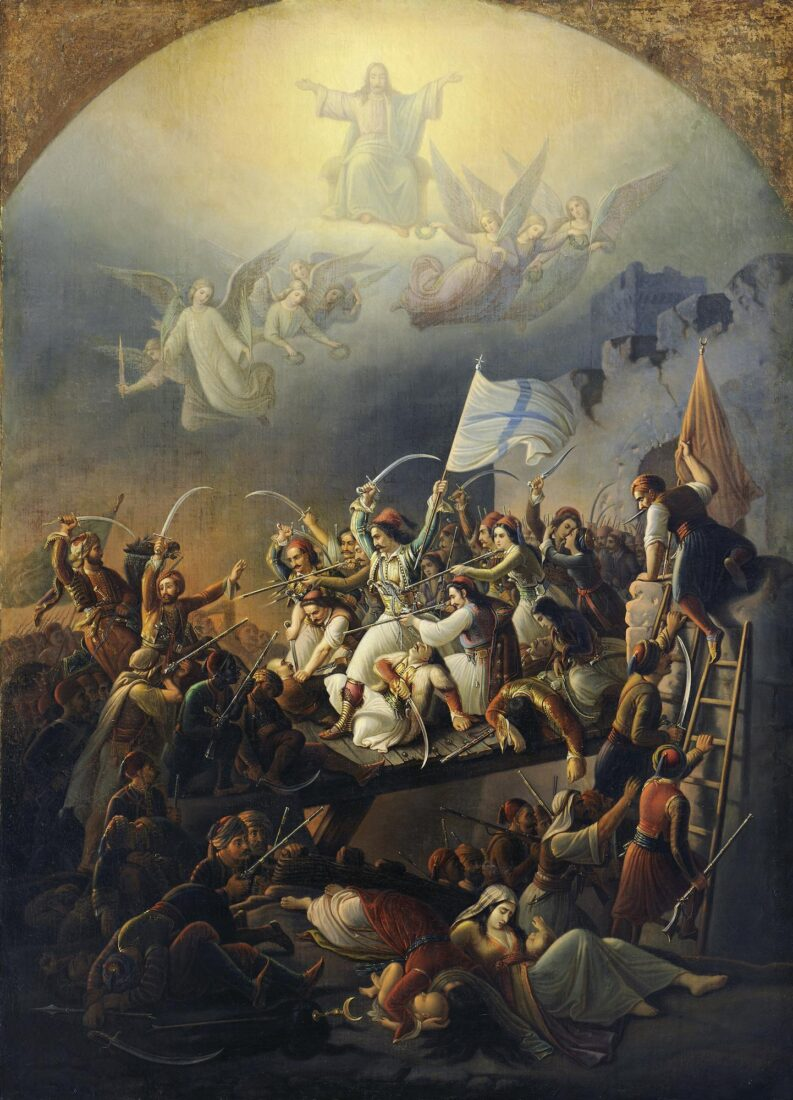
The Sortie of Missolonghi was one of the most dramatic events during the Greek War of Independence

It is often stated that the Greek Revolution was a result of the revolutionary movements that began in France in 1789. Some argue that Filiki Eteria, which was formed by Greeks, was similar to and influenced by various secret organizations that appeared in Europe in the 19th century. However, Filiki Eteria (Greek: Φιλικὴ Ἑταιρεία) or Society of Friends was a secret political and revolutionary organization founded much earlier, in 1814 in Odessa, whose purpose was to overthrow the Ottoman rule of Greece and establish an independent Greek State. Theodoros Kolokotronis, the leader of the national liberation struggle, in his memoirs clarifies that the struggle of the Greeks has nothing to do with the revolutions in other countries, because those were civil wars. There one group was fighting against another or against a King. In Greece they were fighting to free themselves from a foreign conqueror. The Greek War of Independence, also known as the Greek Revolution of 1821 or Greek Revolution (Greek: Ελληνική Επανάσταση, Elliniki Epanastasi; referred to by Greeks in the 19th century as simply the Αγώνας, Agonas, "Struggle"; Ottoman: يونان عصيانى, Yunan İsyanı, "Greek Rebellion"), was a successful war of independence by Greek revolutionaries against the Ottoman Empire between 1821 and 1829. The Greeks were later assisted by the Britain, France, and Russia, while the Ottomans were aided by their North African vassals, particularly the Egypt Eyalet. The war led to the formation of modern Greece. The revolution is celebrated by Greeks around the world as independence day on 25 March.

=== Russia ===
The Decembrist revolt or the Decembrist uprising (Russian: Восстание декабристов, romanized: Vosstanie dekabristov, lit. 'Uprising of the Decembrists') took place in Imperial Russia on 26 December [O.S. 14 December] 1825. Russian army officers led about 3,000 soldiers in a rejection of Emperor Nicholas I's assumption of the throne hours before, as Nicholas's elder brother Constantine had removed himself (non-publicly) from the line of succession. Because these events occurred in December, the rebels became known as the Decembrists (Russian: Декабристы, romanized: Dekabristy).

== Latin America ==
=== Argentina ===
The Decembrist revolution (Spanish: Revolución decembrina) was a military coup in the Buenos Aires Province, Argentina. Juan Lavalle, returning with the troops that fought in the Argentine-Brazilian War, performed a coup on 1 December 1828, capturing and killing the governor Manuel Dorrego and ultimately closing the legislature. The rancher Juan Manuel de Rosas organized militias that fought against Lavalle and removed him from power, restoring the legislature. However, as the coup had reignited the Argentine Civil Wars, Rosas was appointed governor of the Buenos Aires province to wage the war against the Unitarian League. José María Paz made from Córdoba a league of provinces, and so did Rosas. The conflict ended a short time after the unexpected capture of Paz, who mistook enemy troops for his own.

== See also ==
- Age of Revolution
- Revolutions of 1830
- Revolutions of 1848
- Carbonari
- Risorgimento

== Bibliography ==
- Isabella, Maurizio (2025). Southern Europe in the Age of Revolutions. Princeton: Princeton University Press. ISBN 9780691246185.
