= Salvador María del Carril =

1st Vice President of the Argentine Confederation

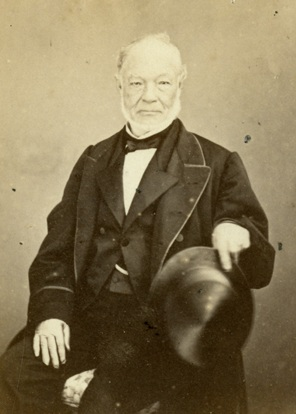

1st Vice President of Argentina
- In office March 5, 1854 – March 5, 1860
- President: Justo José de Urquiza
- Preceded by: Office created
- Succeeded by: Juan Esteban Pedernera

Personal details
- Born: August 5, 1798 San Juan, Viceroyalty of the Río de la Plata (present-day Argentina)
- Died: January 10, 1883 (aged 84) Buenos Aires
- Party: Federalist Party
- Spouse: Tiburcia Domínguez y López Camelo
- Profession: Lawyer

Salvador María del Carril (August 5, 1798 – January 10, 1883) was an Argentine jurist and policy-maker, as well as the country's first Vice President.

== Life and times ==
=== Early life ===
Born in the Andes-range city of San Juan, Argentina, del Carril was a precocious student, and enrolled in the University of Córdoba Law School while still in his teens. Mentored by the school's prestigious ecclesiastical Dean, Gregorio Funes, del Carril received a juris doctor in 1816, at age 18. He relocated to Buenos Aires, the capital of the newly declared United Provinces of South America, and following a stint as a journalist, he was appointed as an official in the Finance Ministry.

General José María Pérez de Urdininea, Governor of his native San Juan Province (which had recently seceded from Mendoza Province), called on del Carril to replace Francisco Narciso de Laprida as his Minister of Government in 1822, the highest-ranking advisory position. Amid the turmoil surrounding the Argentine War of Independence, however, Pérez de Urdininea was returned to active duty in Bolivia by General José de San Martín, leaving del Carril as Governor of San Juan.

=== Governor of San Juan ===
Taking office in January 1823, the 24-year-old Governor undertook an ambitious modernization program, commissioning the construction of roads, bridges, water works, public buildings and parks, purchasing the province's first printing press, and establishing San Juan's first newspaper. Inheriting a province devastated by the wars, he ordered the first Agricultural Census and created a charitable association. The first lawyer to occupy the governor's post, he established San Juan's judicial system and in 1825, promulgated the "May Charter," the province's first constitution.

The liberal May Charter, the first in Argentina to guarantee freedom of worship and mandate the separation of church and state, also forced the closure of monasteries, and ran into arduous opposition from the Catholic Church. Facing a firestorm of protest, the governor was overthrown on July 26, and the May Charter was publicly burned.

=== National policy-maker ===
Del Carril's efforts, however, had gained him the respect of the influential Bernardino Rivadavia, a Buenos Aires lawmaker who, in 1826, was elected the first President of Argentina, and who appointed del Carril Argentina's first Finance Minister. Saddled by the Cisplatine War, the nation's finances became dependent on credit from Baring Brothers in London, and del Carril offered the nation's exports as collateral. His introduction of the Argentine peso fuerte - the first local currency convertible into gold, and the first in Argentina with that name - concentrated wealth into exporters and others with access to hard currency, making peso circulation scarce for the public in general and the war more difficult to finance. Rivadavia's National Bank was mismanaged under del Carril, additionally, and unrest resulted in President Rivadavia's resignation in 1827.

The dissolution of national government ensued within months, in favor of an Argentine Confederation. The advent of the populist Governor of Buenos Aires Province, Manuel Dorrego, was opposed by del Carril, who became an adviser to a conservative insurrection led by General Juan Lavalle. Lavalle's violent 1828 overthrow of Dorrego returned del Carril to the cabinet as Finance and Foreign Minister. A countercoup led by General Juan Manuel de Rosas, a supporter of Dorrego's, forced Lavalle to call elections, though del Carril's manipulation of the results triggered Rosas' overthrow and del Carril's subsequent exile in Montevideo.

=== Exile and return ===
Del Carril remained an active opponent of Rosas' while in exile, supporting a failed 1830 invasion of Entre Ríos Province and negotiating an entente with the Governor of Corrientes Province. He struggled financially, however, though these difficulties were mitigated by his meeting Tiburcia Domínguez y López Camelo, whom he married and had seven children with. Rosas' grasp on power began to slip after the 1838 blockade imposed by France following the death of a French journalist in Buenos Aires, and del Carril was named Supply Commissioner to the French Navy fleet stationed in the Río de la Plata. His tenure in the post attracted controversy, however, when he became conspicuously wealthy in the process.

The 1843 overthrow of his ally, President Fructuoso Rivera of Uruguay, forced del Carril yet again into exile, and he fled to Brazil. He cultivated a friendship via correspondence with the powerful Governor of Entre Ríos, Justo José de Urquiza, in subsequent years, and following the latter's defeat of Rosas' forces in the 1852 Battle of Caseros, del Carril returned to Argentina.

=== Vice Presidency ===
Del Carril was elected to the assembly that approved the 1853 Argentine Constitution. Enmities remaining from the Rosas era thwarted an opportunity to return to the Governor's post in San Juan, however, and despite his personal efforts, Buenos Aires lawmakers rejected the new constitution. His belonging to the Buenos Aires-centric Unitarian Party and rapport with Urquiza (whom Buenos Aires distrusted) made del Carril an easy choice for the latter's running-mate in the elections that November, however, and their national unity ticket was elected handily in the electoral college.

President Urquiza took care to preserve balance in his government between the two camps, placing the Vice President as a counterweight to the Federalist Interior Minister (Home Secretary), Santiago Derqui. Del Carril became the most prominent voice for Buenos Aires interests in the administration, and compounded with a falling-out with erstwhile allies in his native San Juan Province, this ultimately frustrated his hopes that Urquiza might support his 1860 presidential candidacy (support which was tantamount to victory).

Nominating Derqui instead, Urquiza's choice led to renewed conflict with Buenos Aires, and to Derqui's resignation and exile in 1861. National unity on the brink, del Carril negotiated a settlement between Urquiza and the leader of the Buenos Aires insurrection, General Bartolomé Mitre, and when the latter was elected president the following September, del Carril was appointed to the Argentine Supreme Court.

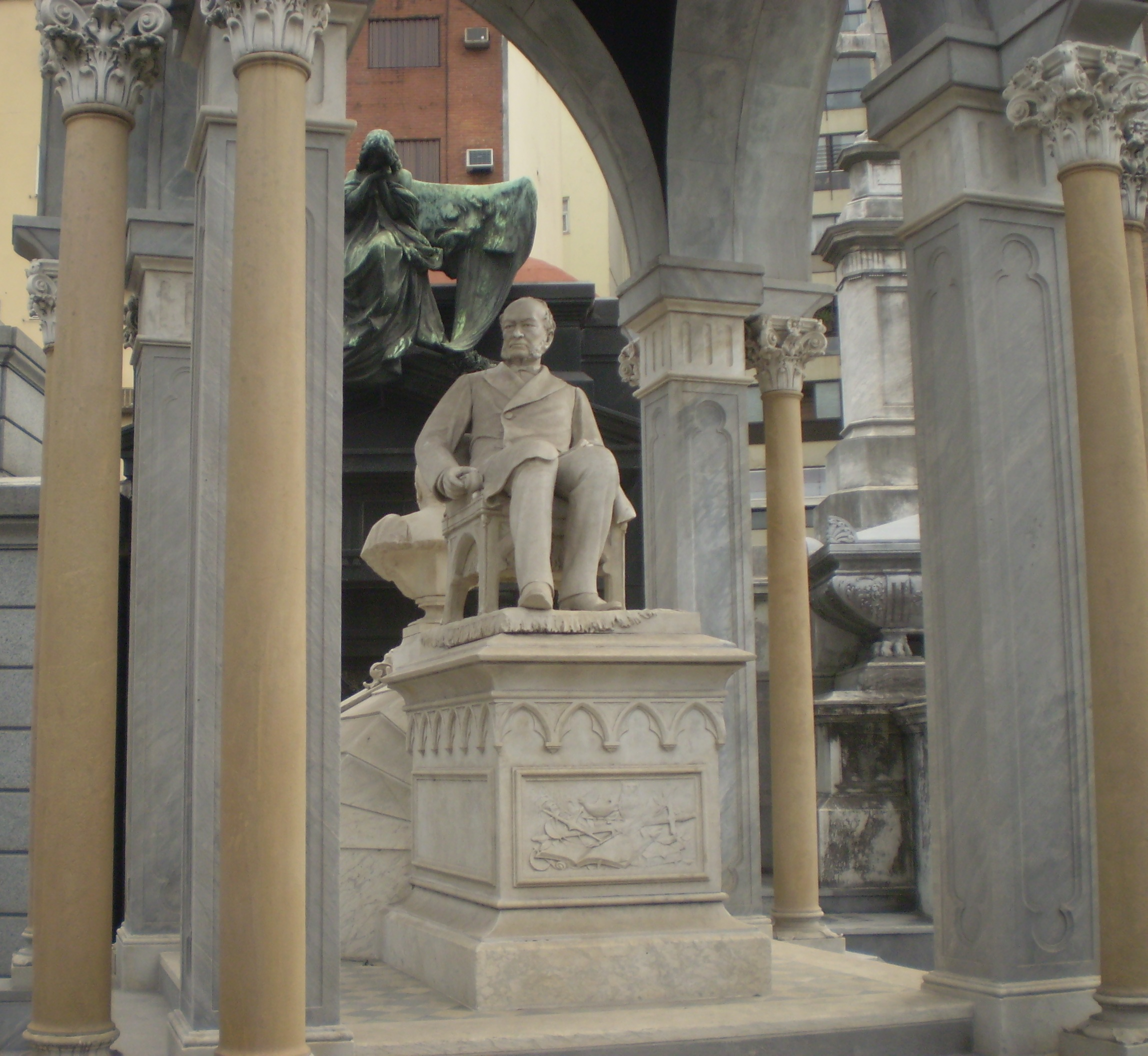
A memorial to del Carril sits atop his Recoleta crypt

Del Carril was a conservative justice, and reliably voted in favor of the executive's frequent use of state of siege declarations and capital punishment. This record helped him secure an appointment as Chief Justice in 1870 by Mitre's supporter and successor, President Domingo Sarmiento, and an uneventful tenure ended with his retirement in 1877. He was again in the spotlight, however, after the 1881 publication by historian Ángel Carranza of correspondence between del Carril and Lavalle during the 1828 coup. The letters revealed that del Carril pressed for the duly-elected Governor Dorrego's execution, advising Lavalle that claims of a fair trial should be concocted, adding that "if we should need to lie to posterity, we lie." The former vice president lived afterwards in seclusion, and died in his Buenos Aires home in 1883, at age 84.

=== Epilogue ===
Del Carril became a wealthy man, and in later life owned over 130,000 hectares (330,000 acres) of land in the agriculturally productive La Pampa Province (worth around a million dollars, at the time). Debts incurred by his wife's spending habits strained the marriage, however, and the seasoned lawyer obtained a discharge of his responsibility for their repayment (leaving the debts in her name, solely). The couple subsequently separated, and after the judge's 1883 burial in an ornate La Recoleta Cemetery crypt, Mrs. del Carril commissioned the grave's sculptor, Camilo Romairone, to create a bust of her likeness - with its back turned towards that of her husband's; she died in 1898.

Political offices
Preceded by none	Vice President of Argentina; 1854 - 1860	Succeeded by Juan Esteban Pedernera
