= Dorrego (disambiguation) =

Dorrego is the last name of the Argentine governor Manuel Dorrego. It may also make reference to:

- The Manuel Dorrego national institute
- The Plaza Dorrego
- The metro station Dorrego (Buenos Aires Metro)
