= Battle of Márquez Bridge =

Battle in Argentinian civil war

Coordinates: 34°39′35.52″S 58°45′24″W

- Part of the Argentine Civil War
Date	26 April 1829
Location	Márquez Bridge, Buenos Aires Province, Argentina
Result	Federalist victory

Belligerents
Federalist army	Unitarian army

Commanders and leaders
Juan Manuel de Rosas; Estanislao López	Juan Lavalle

Strength
7,000 men	1,000 men

The Battle of Márquez Bridge (located on the border between current-day Villa Udaondo and Paso del Rey, Buenos Aires Province, Argentina), fought on 26 April 1829, during the civil war between Unitarians and Federalists, resulting in a victory for the Federal Party forces of Juan Manuel de Rosas and the governor of Santa Fe Province, Estanislao López, over general Juan Lavalle, who had usurped the office of Governor of Buenos Aires Province.

== Prelude ==
After the fall of the Bernardino Rivadavia administration, the leader of the Federalist Party, Colonel Manuel Dorrego, was elected governor of Buenos Aires Province. An alliance of the Unitarian Party with the army chiefs that had fought against the Brazilian Empire deposed Dorrego on 1 December 1828. Days after, Dorrego was defeated at the Battle of Navarro and shot by order of Lavalle.

Rosas, Buenos Aires Province chief of the army, marched to Santa Fe Province, where he joined with Santa Fe governor Estanislao López starting to march on Buenos Aires, to avenge the crime and depose the Unitarian government. Lavalle anticipated and attacked Santa Fe, but López had stronger forces and left Lavalle without effective cavalry and forced him to retreat. Several minor caudillos from the South of Buenos Aires Province forced the Unitarian forces to divide and fight, forcing Lavalle to retreat.

== Battle ==
Lavalle wanted to stop the advance of the Federalist forces on a defensible site, selecting the Márquez Bridge, over the Conchas River (today Reconquista River). he awaited them there with 1,000 men, veterans and well armed, against the 4,000 militiamen of López and Rosas, which were accompanied by about 3,000 Indians.

On 26 April at 6 in the morning, the attack started, and slowly the Federalists dominated the course of events. A little before 10 AM, a noise charge by the Indians spooked Lavalle's horses. The Unitarian cavalry was quickly taken over, while the infantry was forced to retreat, crossing the bridge and destroying it. They then continued the retreat towards today's La Matanza Partido, while López established camp in Luján and Rosas in Cañuelas.

== Consequences ==
The battle left Lavalle's forces diminished and without mobility. López had to return to Santa Fe, as general José María Paz had deposed Córdoba Province governor and could attack Lopez's province of Santa fe at any moment. Rosas established a siege of Lavalle at the city of Buenos Aires, closing access and leaving him without supplies from the countryside. In a few months Lavalle was forced to sign a peace accord with Rosas (see Cañuelas Pact). Rosas would soon later be elected Governor of Buenos Aires Province.

The Battle of Márquez Bridge was a Federalist victory making it possible for the Federalists to take control of the province and take the civil war against the Unitarians to the interior of the country, having the resources of Buenos Aires province, the biggest and richest, behind them. By the end of 1831 the Unitarian Party would be defeated in all the provinces of Argentina.

== Bibliography ==
- Sosa de Newton, Lily (1967). Lavalle. Buenos Aires: Plus Ultra.
- Lacasa, Pedro. Vida del General Juan Lavalle. Buenos Aires.
- Newton, Jorge (1965). Estanislao López, el Patriarca de la Federación. Buenos Aires: Plus Ultra.
- Zinny, Antonio (1987). Historia de los Gobernadores de las Provincias Argentinas. Buenos Aires: Hyspamérica.
- Gianello, Leoncio (1986). Historia de Santa Fe. Buenos Aires: Plus Ultra.
