= Freemen of the South =

Unitarian rebels in Argentina

Freemen of the South Libres del Sur
- Part of Argentine Civil Wars
Date	1839
Location	Southern Buenos Aires Province, Argentina
Result	Federalist provincial government victory

Belligerents
Unitarian & rebel militia	Federalist government of Buenos Aires Province

Commanders and leaders
Ramón Maza; Juan Lavalle	Juan Manuel de Rosas

The Freemen of the South (Spanish: Libres del Sur) were belligerents in an 1839 rebellion in south Buenos Aires province, Argentina against Federalist Governor Juan Manuel de Rosas. A mixture of disgruntled ranchers and Unitarian revolutionaries, the Freemen briefly took control of Dolores, Chascomús and Tandil, and expected to join forces with General Juan Lavalle, who was to lead an army from Uruguay. The rebellion was ultimately defeated at the Battle of Chascomús, and Rosas remained in power in Buenos Aires.

== Causes ==
Governor Juan Manuel de Rosas had been elected to his position in 1835, after which he eliminated his most prominent opponents— especially the Unitarians, but also his fellow Federalists. Rosas drew political support largely from the army and the cattle ranchers, whose interests were well served by his government's economic focus on agricultural exports. However, Rosas' conflict with France in the War of the Confederation changed the economic and social conditions in Buenos Aires Province when the French navy blockaded the Río de la Plata beginning in 1838.

The blockade essentially halted foreign trade with the province. The urban upper class lost access to goods and ideas from Europe, as well as the export trade on which the prosperity of the city depended. At the same time, the disruption of cattle exports removed the principal source of income for the rural parts of the province. The large landowners made almost all of their sales directly or indirectly to the foreign market; when trade was interrupted, the commercialization of their products became very difficult and prices fell rapidly.

The Rosas government was faced with a very significant drop in tax revenues, which depended heavily on foreign trade. To replace this income the governor turned to public lands, which were mostly in the hands of landlords under a system of emphyteusis. These tenants leased the provincial lands from the state for long periods, paying very low rents; Rosas suspended the renewal of leases and demanded that lands be either returned to the state or immediately purchased by their tenants. Emphyteusis was the main form of land tenure in the south of the province, especially to the south of the Salado River. Rosas took advantage of this policy shift to sell the parcels preferentially to his supporters and deny them to politically unreliable elements.

In spite of the efficiency of the Rosistas in the elimination of their adversaries, there were still in the city and in parts of the province opponents to their political methods and the terror inflicted by the Mazorca. However, the ranchers who joined the opposition (especially in the southern part of the province, Rosas's power base before his return to government in 1835) did so only after the blockade, when their export income collapsed, and they were obliged to pay large sums for previously leased land or even dispossessed entirely. Their main motivation was economic.

== The conspiracy of the Mazas and the ranchers ==
The unitarian émigrés focused their actions in Montevideo, where they helped Fructuoso Rivera to overthrow President Manuel Oribe, with the support of the French. Joined in turn by the new Uruguayan government, they dedicated themselves to overthrowing Rosas, and employed all sorts of efforts against him, from editing newspapers critical of their government to organizing and financing anti-government agitation in the Argentine interior. They found an effective leader in General Juan Lavalle, who organized a small army on Martín García Island.

Meanwhile, a group of conspirators in the city of Buenos Aires planned a coup d'etat against the Rosas government. The majority were young romantics, but their numbers also included some military leaders. In order to win further support in the military, they chose a prestigious and well-connected leader: Colonel Ramón Maza, the son of the president of the Provincial Chamber of Representatives, lawyer Manuel Vicente Maza (a personal friend of Rosas). The conspirators in the capital tried to coordinate their actions with those of the disgruntled émigrés in Montevideo, planning a multi-pronged assault on the Rosas regime: an insurrection among the troops in Buenos Aires led by Maza, an uprising among the ranchers in the south of the province, and the advance of Lavalle's army from the north to the capital.

In the north of the province, however, most of the estates were fully owned by their occupants, and emphyteusis only affected a few ranchers; furthermore, cattle producers in that area were able to sell their goods in the ports of the River Paraná, accessing some regional markets. Thus the effects of the French blockade and the government's fiscal demands were more modest in the north, so the conspirators found very little support there. This led them to ask Lavalle to disembark his troops further south, to which the general initially agreed. The chosen point was the village of Ajó (now named General Lavalle) on the River Ajó in the province's southeast, opposite Montevideo.

== The murder of Manuel Maza and the execution of Ramón Maza ==
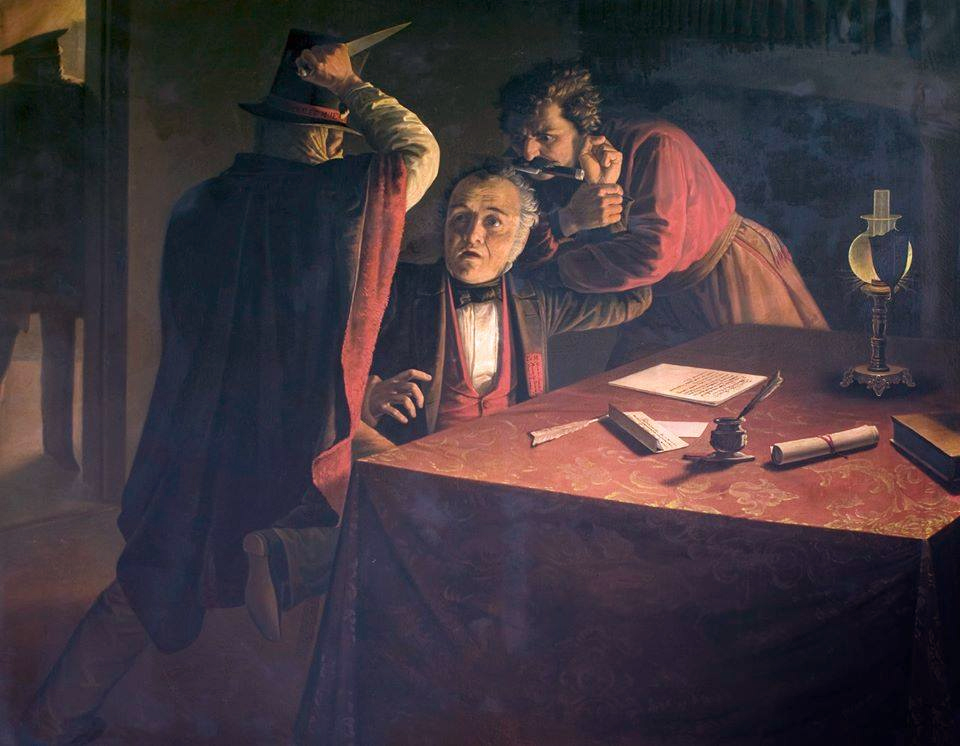
Assassination of Manuel Vicente Maza, painted by Benjamin Franklin Rawson

At the end of June the conspirators in the capital were ready to launch their coup. In their search for collaborators, however, the conspirators had become indiscreet, and Governor Rosas had learned of the preparations. Before they could act, he ordered Colonel Maza arrested as a traitor. His father, Manuel, might have intervened to protect him, but the elder Maza was murdered in his office by unknown assailants. The next day Ramon Maza was executed by firing squad, and his allies fled Buenos Aires.

== The Freemen of the South are left alone ==
The southern ranchers had lost their allies in the capital, but they still had Lavalle. While he was preparing his troops to embark, however, the General learned that the governor of Entre Ríos Province, Pascual Echagüe, had invaded Uruguay. Some landowners in Entre Ríos, including Manuel Hornos, asked Lavalle to use his army to attack the province in the governor's absence; President Rivera of Uruguay also entreated Lavalle to cut the invaders' supply lines. So, Lavalle took his troops to Entre Ríos rather than Buenos Aires, where he occupied Gualeguaychú on 8 September and defeated the substitute governor, Vicente Zapata, in the Battle of Yeruá on 22 September. The ranchers to the south, however, did not know of this change of plans until after they began their uprising.

When the conspirators raised arms against the Rosas government, their military leaders included Colonel Ambrosio Crámer (a Napoleonic veteran living in what is now Lezama), Colonel Pedro Castelli (son of the revolutionary leader Juan José Castelli), and Colonel Manuel Leoncio Rico (a career officer dissatisfied with Rosas). Colonel Nicolás Granada was also invited to join them, but he remained loyal to Rosas.

== The Cry of Dolores ==
At dawn on 29 October 1839, Colonel Rico entered Dolores, summoned the justice of the peace, and ordered him to gather the people. By the end of the day, the call was answered by 170 armed townspeople, who were exhorted by Rico to throw off the tyranny of Governor Rosas and support the southern uprising. Rico was appointed general commander of the militias, and symbols of Rosas and his regime were torn down and defaced. A militia headquarters was established near the old cemetery, where about 1,500 villagers and gauchos gathered. The next day they were joined by Cramer, who judged the rebels to be completely disorganized and very poorly armed; he immediately began to train the militia. On 1 November they were joined by Commander Jose Mendiola, who led the uprising in Chascomús.

== The Battle of Chascomús ==
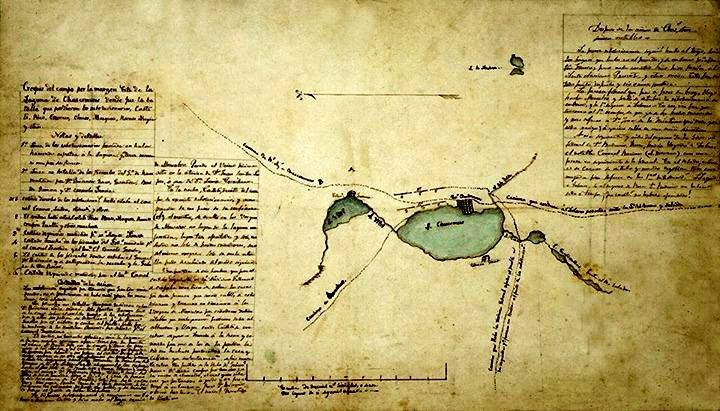
Map of the Battle of Chascomús from the General Archive of Argentina

In the early days of November, news came to Dolores that Lavalle had changed plans and would not be attacking Buenos Aires; in response, the rebels accelerated their plans, hoping to prevent Rosas from gathering his troops and persuading the gauchos to abandon the uprising. Rico decided it was time to advance on the capital, moving his troops up to Chascomús. The hasty advance minimized desertions in the rebel militia, but it also prevented any serious military training.

By order of the governor, his brother, Colonel Prudencio Rosas, advanced from Azul to the north, incorporating the troops of Colonel Granada, who had mobilized from Tapalqué. Gathering some reinforcements sent from the outskirts of the capital, he headed for Chascomús with orders to immediately disarm all revolutionary militias and order them to return home.

The army of the so-called "Libres del Sur" was encamped on the shores of Laguna de Chascomús when, in the early hours of November 11, news arrived that the forces of Granada had entered the village. At this point, the revolutionaries continued to believe that Granada had come to join them, so they went out to receive him in parade formation. Instead, Granada attacked them with all his force, disorganizing the camp; however, the revolutionaries responded quickly, and Prudencio Rosas fled the battlefield, reaching the nearby town of Ranchos, from where he wrote to his brother that the battle was lost.

At the same time, Granada gathered the dispersed forces of Prudencio Rosas and (with the collaboration of one of Rico's officers) defeated the revolutionaries. Cramer died on the battlefield; the other rebel military leaders and most of the ranchers fled, while most of the gauchos surrendered.

== The defeated ==
Learning of the victory, Prudencio Rosas returned to Chascomús, where he took credit for the victory. He then pardoned the gauchos, proclaiming that the governor knew they had been compelled or tricked into fighting against the Federalist government. In that way, Rosas earned the gratitude of the gauchos and avoided further problems.

Most of the rebel ranchers and soldiers, guided by Rico, fled toward the coast of Samborombón Bay. Some conspirators who had not participated in the uprising, including the Governor's other brother, Gervasio Rosas, gave notice to the French blockade squadron, which approached the coast and embarked the fugitives. Many civilians settled in Montevideo, while the military men and some ranchers joined the army of Lavalle, which had already relocated to Corrientes.

Castelli became separated from the rest of the rebel troop and was killed by the pursuers; his head was displayed on a pike in the town square of Dolores for seven years. On 18 August 1859, a monument in honor of the Freemen of the South was built in the same place where the pillory had held the head of Castelli.

== Tandil ==
Around the same time as the Battle of Chascomús, another separate uprising took place in Tandil in support of the Freemen of the South. The revolution was supported by revolutionary general Eustoquio Díaz Vélez, the most important rancher and local landowner, who added his gauchos and countrymen to the revolt. The rebels took over the town peacefully for a few days, but Rosas sent Colonel Echeverria against them from Tapalque, commanding troops and many allied Indians.

The government forces and their allies immediately assaulted Tandil, destroying the town completely; out of six hundred people who lived there, only two dozen were left by the end. The revolutionaries were arrested and their property confiscated. Eustoquio Díaz Vélez suffered the same fate, although months later (because of his personal prestige) he was allowed to go into exile with his family in Montevideo.

== Consequences ==
During the succeeding year, occasional bandit raids suggested that the uprising could be repeated, but the south of the province was gradually stabilized. Lavalle used troops from Corrientes to invade the province of Entre Ríos, where he fought in two inconclusive battles. Later, he advanced into Buenos Aires Province, where he received some support from the ranchers of the north of the province, but none from the south. Lavalle later retired to the north of the country, joined the Northern Coalition, and was defeated and killed. Manuel Rico died shortly before.

On 16 September 1840, Governor Rosas issued a decree by which he confiscated the property of all who participated in the failed revolt. The seizure included all kinds of goods, both movable and immovable, urban and rural. The proceeds were devoted to prizes granted to individuals and to repairing the expenses of the war. More than 400 people suffered confiscations of their property, which included 659,000 cattle, 226,000 sheep and 70,300 horses.

Rosas managed to preserve his government and his rural power base for twelve more years. On 23 December 1839 he divided the south of Buenos Aires Province into fourteen new partidos, including greatly reducing the Partido of Dolores. This division has been interpreted as a punishment to the town of Dolores for having been the seat of the revolution.
