= John Lavalle (painter) =

American painter

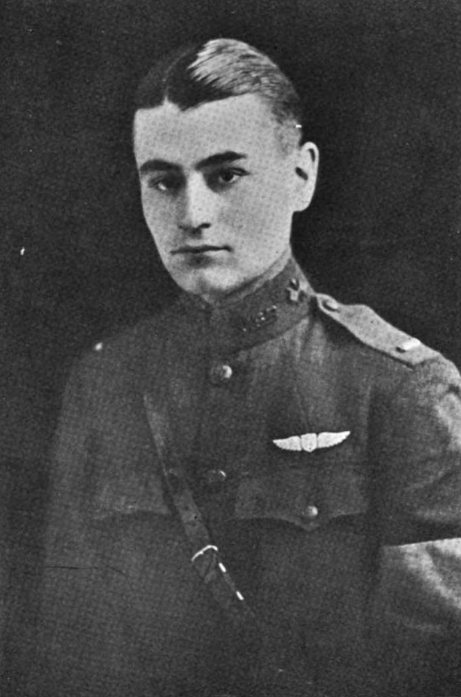
- Lavalle serving with the RAF 33rd Wing in World War I
- Born: June 24, 1896; Nahant, Massachusetts, U.S.
- Died: November 13, 1971 (aged 75); Southampton, New York, U.S.
- Education: Harvard University; Académie Julian; School of the Museum of Fine Arts, Boston
- Occupation: Painter
- Spouses: Ellen Tufts; Virginia Wilson; Martha Nicholson Doubleday Hoyt
- Children: 1 son, 2 daughters
- Relatives: Juan Lavalle (paternal great-grandfather)

John Lavalle, Jr. (June 24, 1896 – November 13, 1971) was an American artist born in Nahant, Massachusetts on June 24, 1896. He was the great‐grandson of Juan Lavalle one of the founders of the Argentine Republic.

John Lavelle attended St. Paul's School, New Hampshire before going on to Harvard. At the outbreak of World War I he served as a bomber pilot with the Second Oxford Detachment of the British Royal Air Force. In Paris, Lavalle studied at the Académie Julian as a pupil of Jean-Francis Aubertin. Upon returning to the US he enrolled at the School of the Boston Museum of Fine Arts, going on to establish himself as a successful painter of society portraits throughout the 1920s and 30s.

When the US entered World War II Lavalle served as a camouflage artist for the 12th Air Force prior to the invasion of Sicily, and painted many portraits and combat scenes of its subsequent campaigns. Several of these appear in the volume 'Mediterranean Sweep' published in 1944. After World War II, Lavalle moved from Boston to New York where he painted numerous portraits of various eminent academics.

His watercolors and landscapes are held in the collections of the Boston Museum of Fine Arts, the Brooklyn Museum, the Harvard Art Museums, and the Parrish Art Museum in New York, of which he became the first vice president. He was awarded a bronze medal by the National Arts Club in 1954.

John Lavalle died in Southampton, New York on November 13, 1971.
