= Lily Sosa de Newton =

Argentine historian, biographer and essayist (1920–2017)

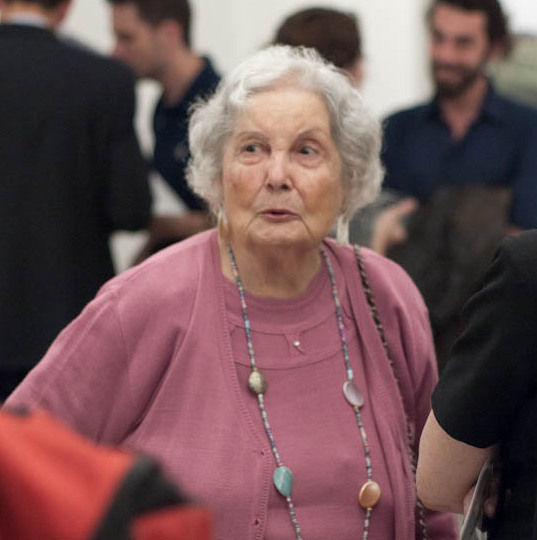
- de Newton in 2016
- Born: October 24, 1920; Morón, Buenos Aires, Argentina
- Died: May 14, 2017 (aged 96); Ciudadela, Buenos Aires, Argentina
- Occupations: Historian; biographer; essayist
- Spouse: Jorge Newton

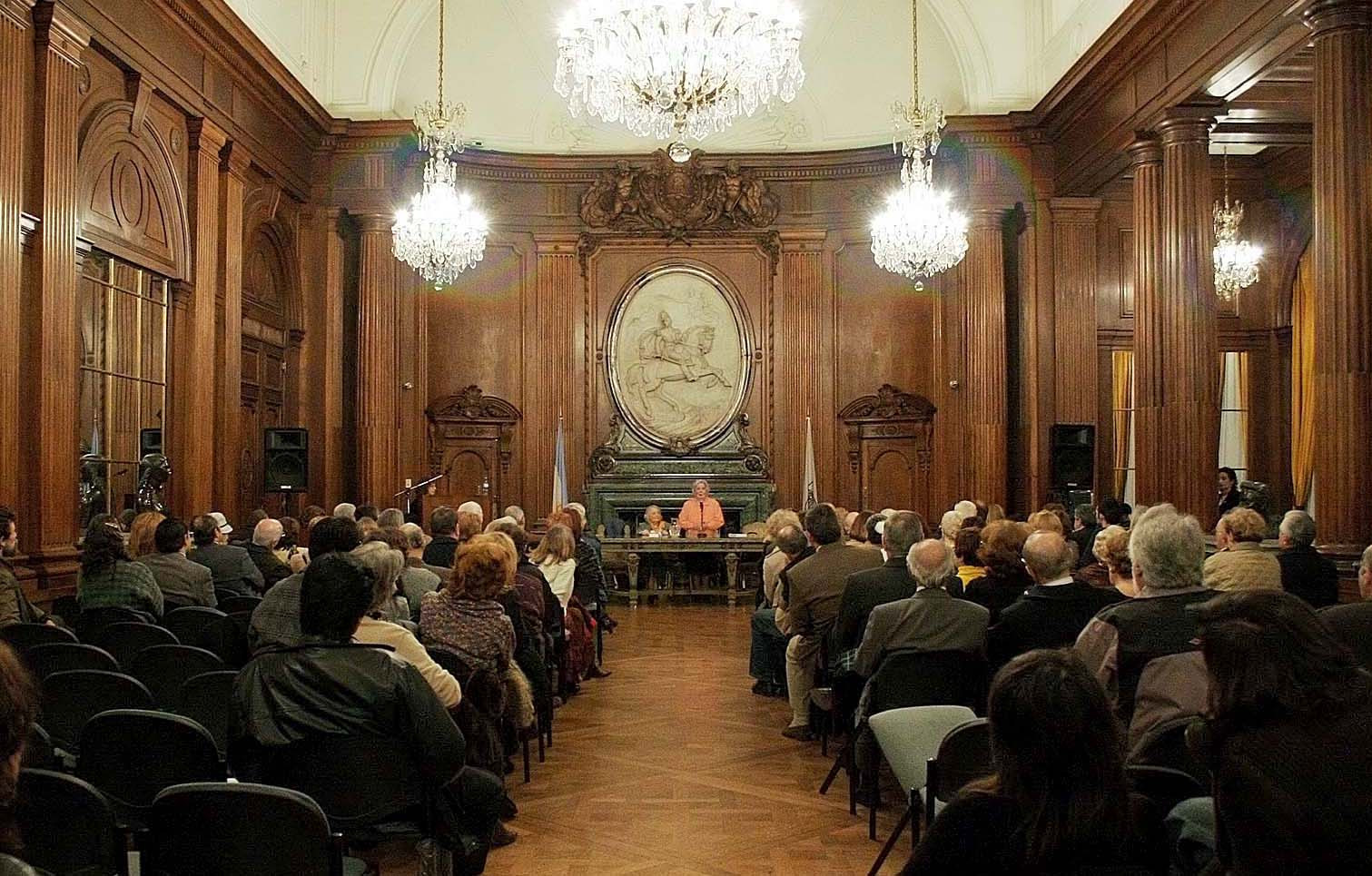
Lily Sosa de Newton at the Salón San Martín of the Legislature of Buenos Aires.

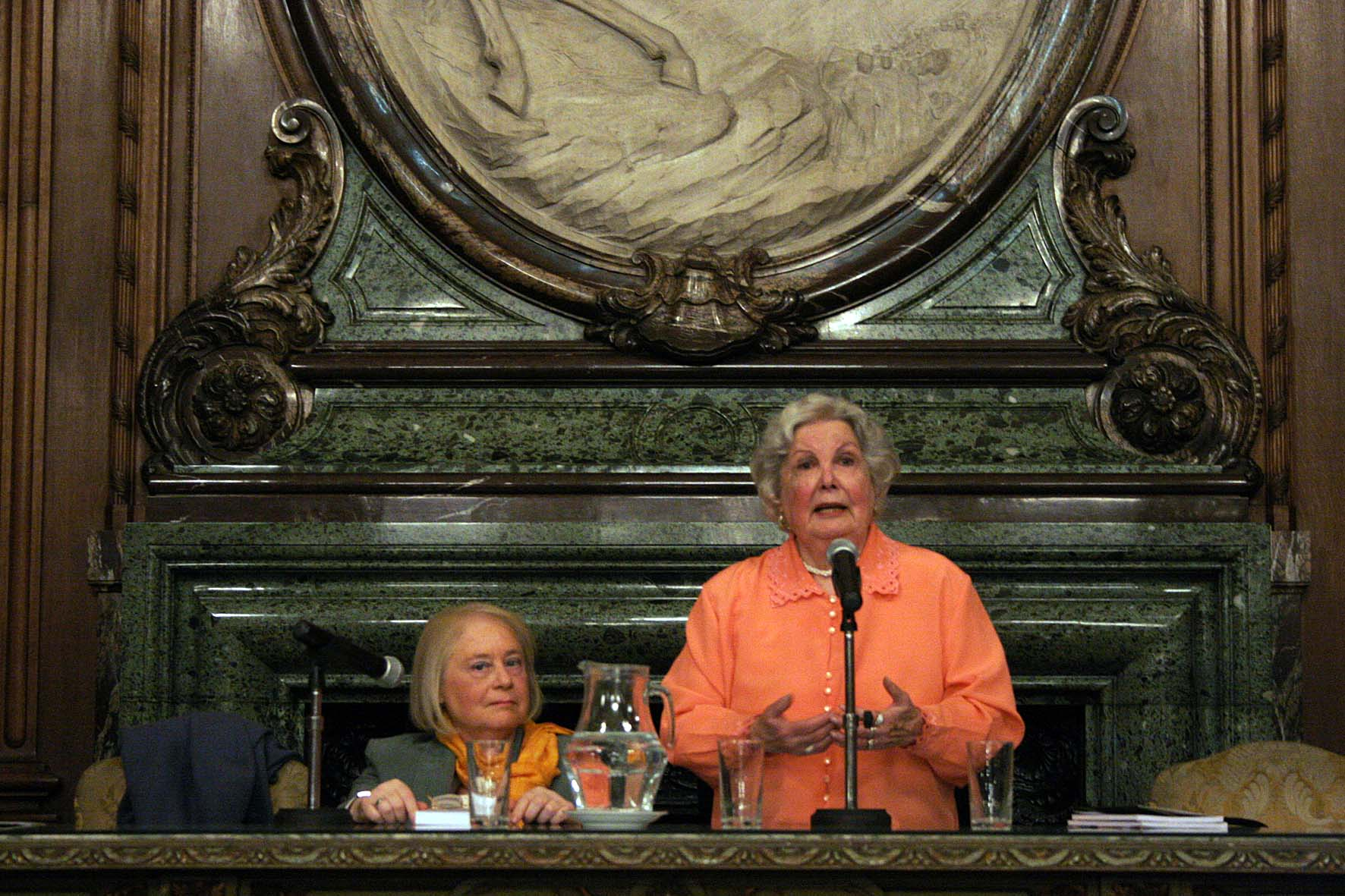
Lily Sosa de Newton at the Salón San Martín of the Legislature of Buenos Aires. Next to her, Doc. María Rosa Pugliese.

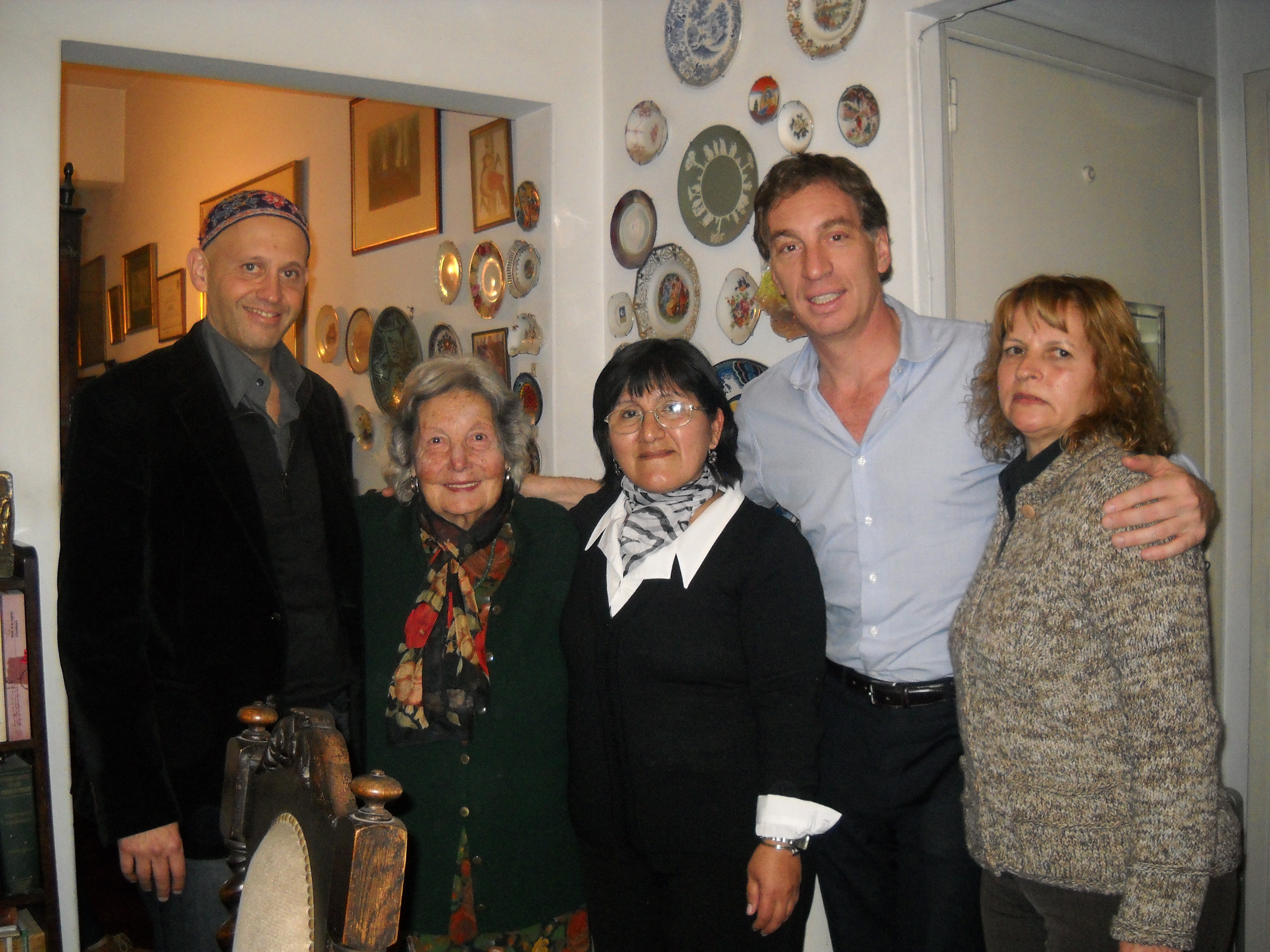
Lily Sosa de Newton with Mr. Diego Santilli and rabbi Sergio Bergman, in her house.

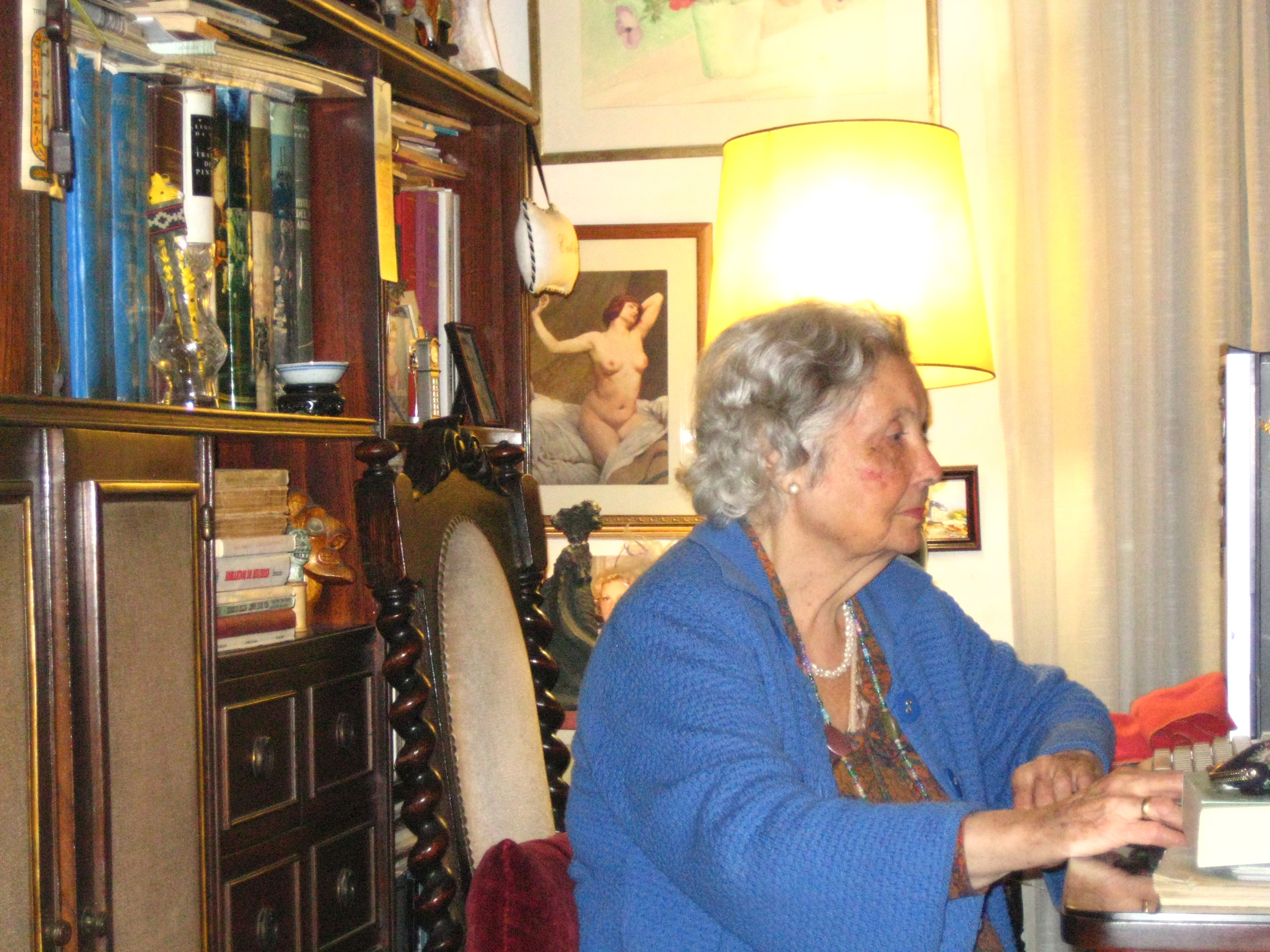
Lily Sosa de Newton working at her office.

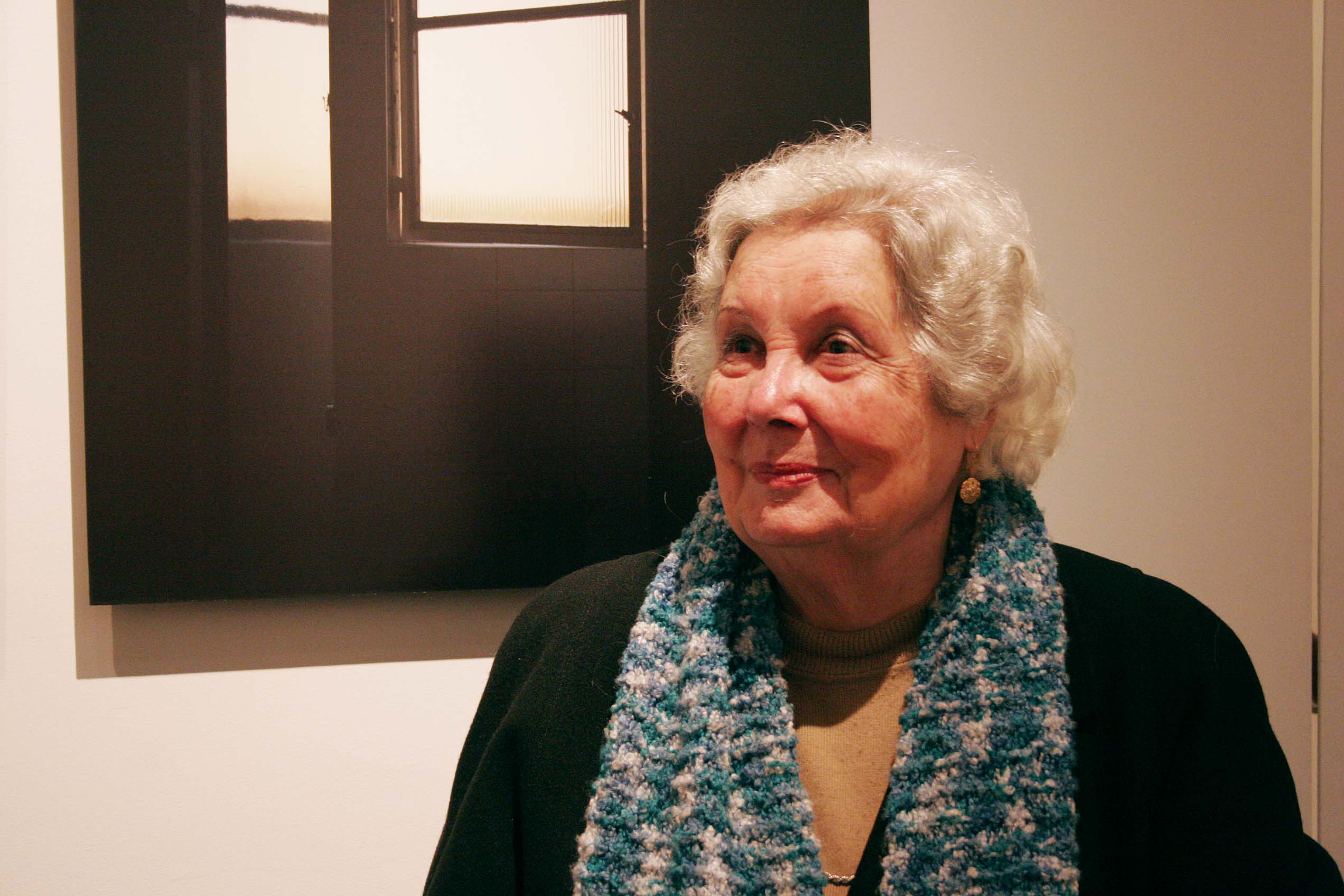
Lily Sosa de Newton at Lena Szankay's Vernissage in the Centro de la Cooperación.

Lily Sosa de Newton (October 24, 1920 – May 14, 2017) was an Argentine historian, biographer and essayist. She was a pioneer in historical research on Argentine women in different fields. She also wrote numerous biographies of historical figures.

== Early life ==
She was born on October 24, 1920, in Morón Province of Buenos Aires, a few kilometres from the capital. It was there where her paternal and maternal grandparents lived and where her parents had married. She had an older brother and a younger sister. Then they moved to the city of Buenos Aires, where she studied, first in the Liceo No. 1 and then as a teacher in the 'colegio de Adoratrices'.

In 1938 she met renowned Argentine historian Jorge Newton, journalist and writer. Later on she married him who urged her to investigate and write. They wrote together some titles in co-authorship, both books and newspaper articles.

In 1941, newly married, they went to live in Santa Fe because her husband had been appointed editor of a new newspaper, Santa Fe de Hoy. They lived there for three years.

== Career ==
Lily Sosa de Newton was a pioneer in visualising women and wrote the Biographical Dictionary of Argentine Women in 1970, when no one dealt with these issues.

She wrote her first essay 'Las Argentinas de ayer y hoy' (the Argentinian women from then and today) which had a very favorable review in all newspapers. She became a member of the SADE and that year she won the 'Faja de Honor' in the Essay category.

The Editorial Plus Ultra, which published books by Jorge Newton-a series about the caudillos of the provinces- proposed her to write about characters in Argentine history such as Lavalle, Dorrego and Paz, among others. In a few years, she published those three biographies, and also that of Gregorio Aráoz de Lamadrid.

Following the success of "Las Argentinas de ayer y hoy", she undertook the more demanding project of compiling the Biographical Dictionary of Argentine Women. Drawing on the index of names she had assembled for her previous work, she began writing biographies of prominent historical Argentine women from the fields of literature, art, education, and politics.

She won the first prize in the contest of EUDEBA (Editorial University of Buenos Aires) for the Collection "Genius and Figure" with her book on Hilario Ascasubi, published in 1980, and the Honorable Mention Award "Ricardo Rojas" in Buenos Aires. She published 'Narradoras argentinas' (1852-1932) in 1995 and in 1999 'Las protagonistas', a collection of short biographies of international characters. In 2007, 'Las Argentinas y su historia' was published. It was an essay published with the support of the BA Culture Fund (Metropolitan Program for the Promotion of Culture, Arts and Sciences), of the Government of the city of Buenos Aires. She participated in congresses and diverse meetings about history and feminine problems and her work has been published in acts and collective works, as well as collaborations in magazines and newspapers.

She worked until 1998 as press and public relations director of Editorial Plus Ultra. She participated in graphic media, television and radio.

She died on May 14, 2017, at Ciudadela.

== Books ==
- Historia de la Sociedad Rural Argentina en el centenario de su fundación (2ª ed.). Editorial y Librería Goncourt. 1966. (with Jorge Newton).
- Historia del Jockey Club de Buenos Aires (1ª ed.). Ediciones L. N. 1966. (junto a Jorge Newton).
- Las argentinas de ayer a hoy (1ª ed.). Librería y Editorial L. V. Zanetti. 1967.
- Lavalle (1ª ed.). Plus Ultra. 1967. ISBN 978-950-21-0193-4.
- Dorrego (1ª ed.). Plus Ultra. 1967. ISBN 978-950-21-0190-3.
- El General Paz (1ª ed.). Plus Ultra. 1969. ISBN 978-950-21-0191-0.
- Lamadrid (1ª ed.). Plus Ultra. 1971. ISBN 978-950-21-0192-7.
- Diccionario biográfico de mujeres argentinas (1ª ed.). graf.Bartolomé U.Chiesino. 1972. Reedited by Plus Ultra in 1980
- Genio y figura de Hilario Ascasubi (1ª ed.). Editorial Universitaria de Buenos Aires. 1981.
- Las mujeres argentinas (1ª ed.). Plus Ultra. 1992. ISBN 978-950-21-1068-4.
- Narradoras argentinas (1ª ed.). Plus Ultra. 1995. ISBN 978-950-21-1218-3.
- Las protagonistas (1ª ed.). Plus Ultra. 1998. ISBN 978-950-21-1308-1.
- Las argentinas y su historia (1ª ed.). Feminaria Editora. 2007. ISBN 978-987-21999-4-4.
