= Cañuelas Pact =

1829 agreement in Argentina

The Cañuelas Pact was an agreement signed on 24 June 1829 between generals Juan Lavalle and Juan Manuel de Rosas, with the aim of ending the civil war in Buenos Aires Province, Argentina, which had been going on since the revolution of December 1828.

== Previous events ==
The revolution commanded by Unitarian general Juan Lavalle against Buenos Aires Province Governor Colonel Manuel Dorrego, was quick and almost bloodless, with the governor fleeing. Chased by Lavalle's forces, Dorrego was defeated at the Battle of Navarro, and a few days later shot by order of Lavalle, who made himself the new governor.

Until that time the revolution had been running without major problems, but the execution of Dorrego displeased many of the factions; the gauchos from the countryside of the province revolted; many leaders of the city of Buenos Aires declared themselves against Lavalle;, general José María Paz took a good part of the army in a campaign against Córdoba Province;. The governor of the neighboring Santa Fe Province, Estanislao López, started a campaign against the new government of Buenos Aires and the commander of the provincial militias, Juan Manuel de Rosas, marched to Santa Fe.

Lavalle expelled his enemies from the city, but was not able to suppress the gaucho rebellion. He marched on Santa Fe but López forced him to retreat, and chased him back to the capital. The joint forces of López and Rosas caught up with Lavalle at the Márquez Bridge inflicting a defeat on him.

Rosas established a siege of Buenos Aires, precluding Lavalle's forces and the entire population of the city of receiving any kind of external help or supplies, including food. Lavalle, isolated and only supported by a dwindling minority of the Unitarian Party, he did not have many options left. Even though he avoided the taking of the city by his enemies, he did not have sufficient forces, especially in cavalry, to oppose Rosas and break the siege.

== Negotiations ==
Without prior notice, Lavalle left one night, accompanied only by an aide to Rosas' headquarters in the town of Cañuelas. The next morning, Rosas and Lavalle started negotiations to reach an agreement and end the conflict. They did not agree on the first day, but their aides continued meeting for a few more days.

== The agreement ==
The agreement reached in the Pact that was finally signed were:

1. Cessation of hostilities by both sides
2. Election of a Representative Commission, to vote in the capital city
3. The Commission would elect a new governor who could not be either Lavalle or Rosas
4. Both armies would be commanded by the new governor

In a second part of the agreement they decided that:

1. To avoid electoral conflicts, there would be one list of candidates for Representatives
2. The governor's election would be to Félix Álzaga, to whom they imposed the names of his ministers, half Federales, half Unitarians.

== Failure of the Pact ==
The Unitarians interpreted this agreement of Lavalle as treason, and even though they created a unity electoral list, on the eve of the election, they presented a second list, including only Unitarians. As the city of Buenos Aires was controlled by Unitarian troops, the rebel list triumphed without dissent.

Rosas refused to accept the results of the election, refused to lift the siege and closed all the entrances to the city, restarting the attacks on the Buenos Aires army.

Lavalle, who had personally signed this agreement in Cañuelas, and his followers, who admitted they had underestimated Rosas, started negotiations anew. The result of this would be the Barracas Convention, where they would recall the Legislature from the times of Dorrego and general Juan José Viamonte would assume a provisional government.

A few months later, Lavalle and his officers went to exile and Rosas became governor.
