= Manuel Dorrego national institute =

Institute of Argentine history focused in the historiography of Manuel Dorrego

Manuel Dorrego national institute of Argentine and Iberoamerican historical revisionism
- Instituto Nacional de Revisionismo Histórico Argentino e Iberoamericano Manuel Dorrego
- Established: November 17, 2011
- Research type: History
- Field of research: History of Argentina
- President: Pacho O'Donnell
- Vice president: Aracelli Bellotta; Víctor Ramos
- Location: Argentina

The Manuel Dorrego national institute (full name: "Manuel Dorrego national institute of Argentine and Iberoamerican historical revisionism", Spanish: Instituto Nacional de Revisionismo Histórico Argentino e Iberoamericano Manuel Dorrego) was an institute of Argentina focused in the historiography of Manuel Dorrego. It was created on November 17, 2011, by decree 1880/2011. It is part of the Secretary of Culture of the national government. The first president was Pacho O'Donnell, working with other historians. The institute is named after Manuel Dorrego, an Argentine governor of the 19th century who was deposed and executed during the Argentine Civil Wars, but the scope includes as well other Argentine historical figures, such as Juan Manuel de Rosas and Juan Perón, and Iberoamerican national heroes as Simón Bolívar and Bernardo O'Higgins. The decree considers that the historiography of Argentina is biased towards the Unitarian Party, as the first historians (such as Bartolomé Mitre), and seeks to counter such bias.

Several members resigned in 2013, including O'Donnell, who was replaced by Víctor Ramos. Ramos was fired when he voiced his support for Daniel Scioli in the 2015 elections, and the institution was intervened. The president during the intervention was Carlos Caramello, a close friend of the minister Aníbal Fernández. Mauricio Macri, opposed to Cristina Kirchner, won the 2015 elections and became president in December 2015. His minister of culture, Pablo Avelluto, closed the institute at the end of the month.

== See also ==
- Manuel Dorrego
- Historiography of Argentina
