= Estanislao López =

Argentine politician and general

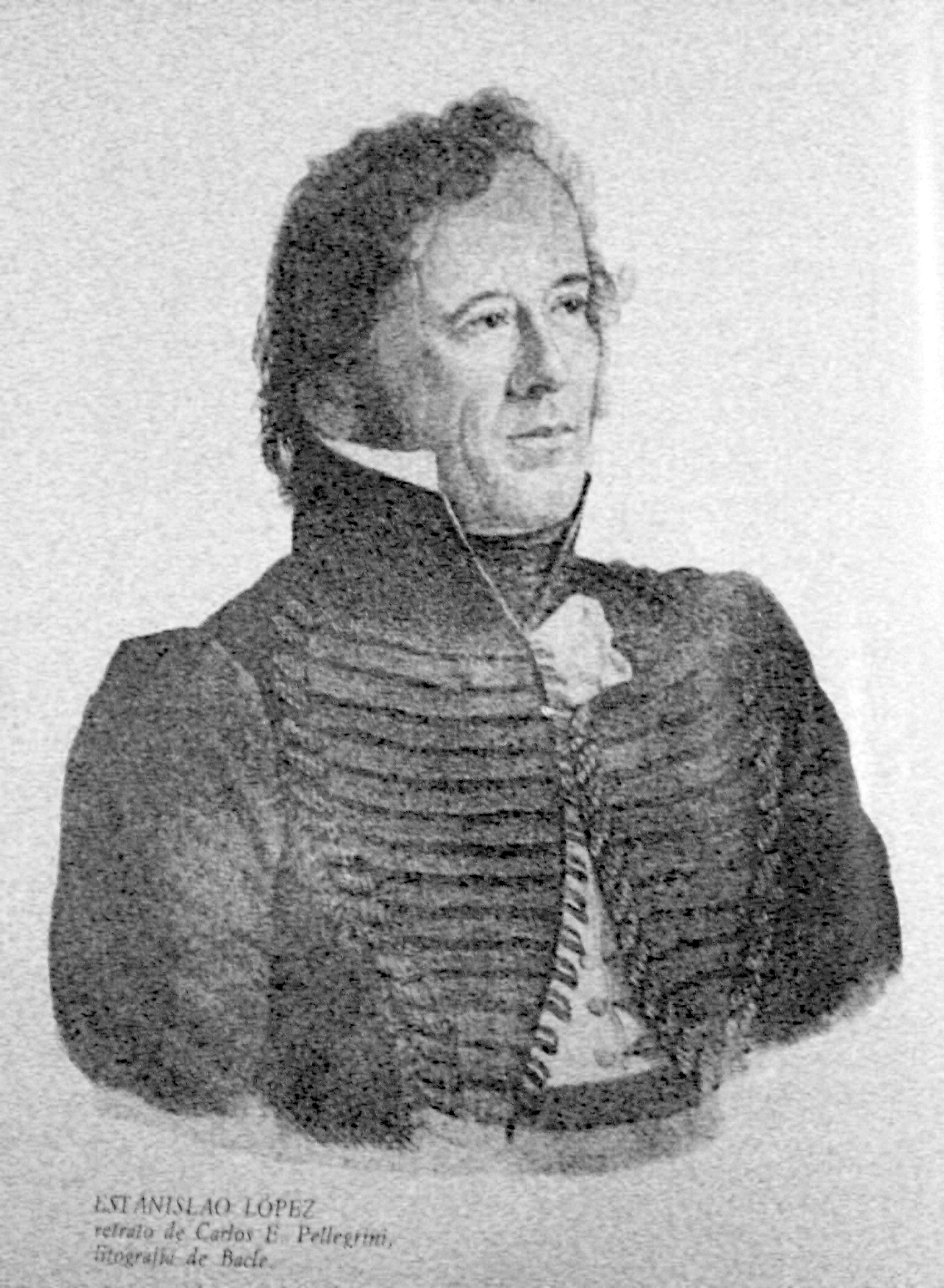

Governor of Santa Fe
- In office 23 July 1818 – 15 June 1838
- Preceded by: Mariano Vera
- Succeeded by: Domingo Cullen

Personal details
- Born: 26 November 1786 Santa Fe, Viceroyalty of Río de la Plata
- Died: 15 June 1838 (aged 51) Santa Fe, Argentine Confederation
- Party: Federalist
- Spouse: María Josefa del Pilar Rodríguez del Fresno
- Occupation: Army officer

Estanislao López (26 November 1786 – 15 June 1838) was a caudillo and governor of the province of Santa Fe, Argentina, between 1818 and 1838, one of the foremost proponents of provincial federalism, and an associate of Juan Manuel de Rosas during the Argentine Civil War. He is considered an iconic figure in Santa Fe and one of the most influential political actors in the Argentine conflicts of the 1820s and 1830s.

== Biography ==
López was born in Santa Fe. An illegitimate child, he was baptized with his mother's last name at the request of his father, Juan Manuel Roldán. Roldán sent the youth away to fight against Malón raids in the Gran Chaco region at age 15. He fought in the retake of Buenos Aires from the British invasion of 1806, and in the Argentine War of Independence under the command of Manuel Belgrano (creator of the Argentine flag); during this latter conflict, López was held prisoner in Montevideo in 1810.

In 1816 he led his men in an uprising against Buenos Aires, where the Buenos Aires army under General Juan José Viamonte was forced to surrender. Along with José Gervasio Artigas (leader of the Banda Oriental, now Uruguay), he became a hero of this campaign. After this, in 1818, López assumed the government of Santa Fe, deposing governor Mariano Vera, separating the province from Buenos Aires control, and ruling by popular consensus for 20 years. He was formally elected governor on 1 July 1818 and then indefinitely reelected.

López rejected a draft for a provincial constitution for Santa Fe (which accepted a centralized government from Buenos Aires), and wrote another one, where he incorporated the idea of popular election of the governor by direct vote, which was approved on 26 August 1819. He married the former María Josefa del Pilar Rodríguez del Fresno on 17 December, and they had seven children. López allied with Artigas and then with Francisco Ramírez, caudillo of Entre Ríos, amassing large armies against Buenos Aires, at the time ruled by Supreme Director Juan Martín de Pueyrredón. General José de San Martín, Liberator and hero of the Independence Wars, wrote separate letters to López and Artigas urging them to cease hostilities and join the national cause. San Martín also refused Pueyrredón's request to divert troops from the independentist conflict toward the defense of the national government.

After Pueyrredón's forced resignation, López went to war again, together with Ramírez, former Supreme Director Carlos María de Alvear and José Miguel Carrera (former president of Chile). The three allies defeated the forces of Buenos Aires led by José Rondeau in the Battle of Cepeda on 1 February 1820, which marked the end of the Supreme Directorship and the victory of provincial federalism. Peace was ratified by the Governor Manuel de Sarratea of Buenos Aires, as well as López and Ramírez, through the Treaty of Pilar (23 February 1820).

In 1821 an incident broke his alliance with Francisco Ramírez, who was killed near Coronda by a group of López's soldiers when he was crossing Santa Fe's territory to attack Córdoba. López exhibited Ramírez's head publicly in the Cabildo of Santa Fe. He thus became the indisputed leader of the littoral provinces, and on 7 April 1822 he signed the Quadrilateral Treaty with Entre Ríos, Corrientes and Buenos Aires, calling for national unity and convening on the call to a Constitutional Assembly in Santa Fe.

López protected Juan Manuel de Rosas when he had to flee after the defeat of Manuel Dorrego's army by Juan Lavalle in Navarro. He then joined forces with Rosas to defeat Lavalle in Puente de Márquez on 26 April 1829. After Rosas made peace with Lavalle without López's consent, the relationship between the allies was strained.

In 1831, with Rosas being the governor of Buenos Aires and the littoral provinces threatened by the centralist Unitarian League, led by José María Paz, the Federal Pact was subscribed on January 4 by the four provinces, forging a military alliance and establishing the basis of a federal organization of the country. After Paz was captured, the civil war ended for a time, and Rosas was free to rule on the national level.

López ruled Santa Fe until his death on 15 June 1838. He was succeeded by Domingo Cullen.

The Estadio Brigadier General Estanislao López and the Brigadier Estanislao López Highway are named after him.

Preceded by Mariano Vera	Governor of Santa Fe; 1818–1838	Succeeded by Domingo Cullen

== Sources ==
In Spanish unless otherwise noted.

- Todo-Argentina.net - Biography.
- WebFe - History of Santa Fe (timeline).
- José de San Martín, el Libertador - Biography of General San Martín.
- ArgentinaWorld - History of Santa Fe.
- Treaty of Pilar, 23 Feb 1820 (complete text, MS Word 2000 DOC file).
- Santa Fe - History of the city of Santa Fe (official website).
- Constitución de la Provincia de Santa Fe (1819) (complete text of the 1819 provincial constitution, MS Word 2000 DOC file).
