= Unitarian League =

Allied faction of Argentine provinces (1830-31) in the Argentine Civil Wars

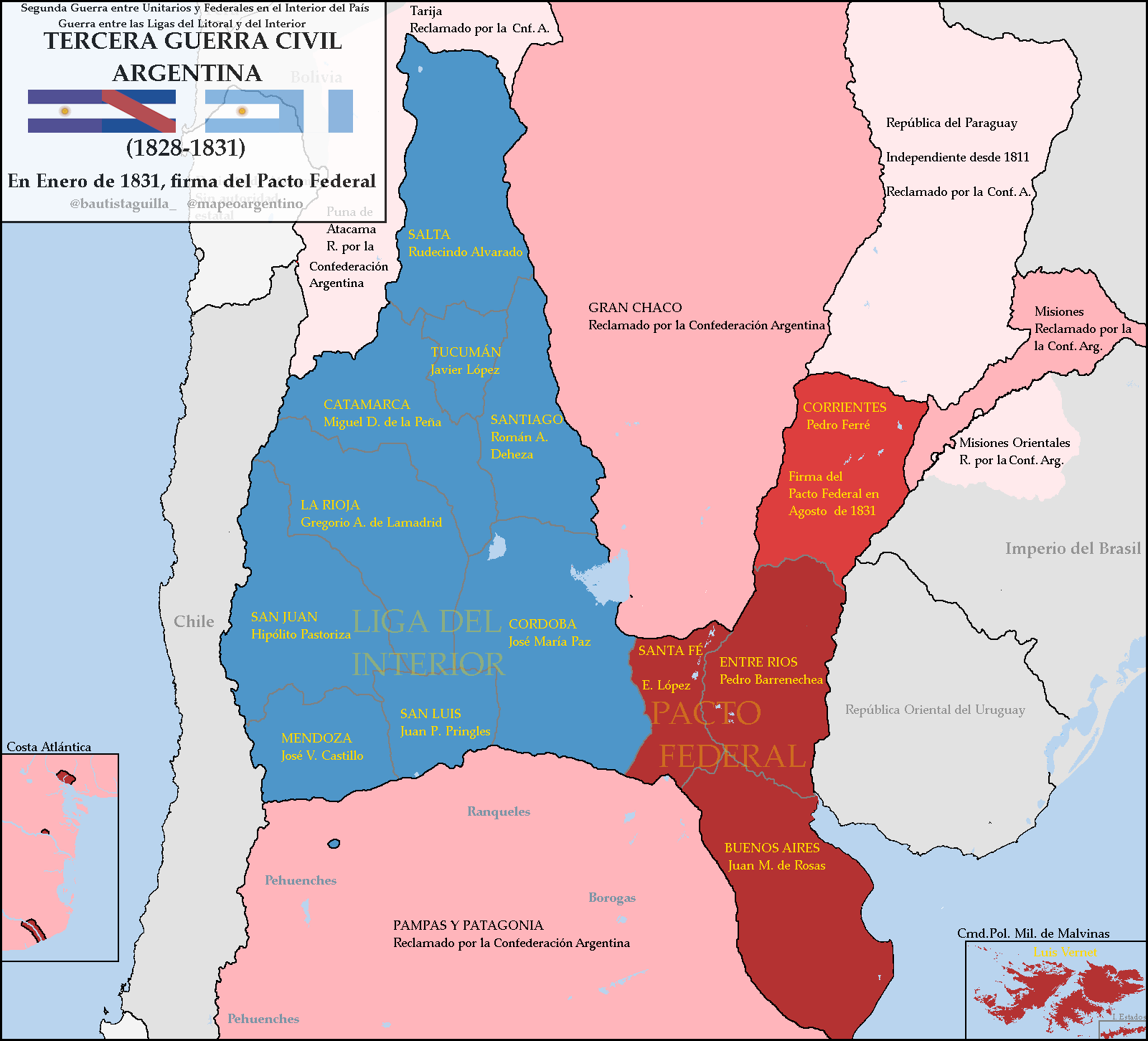
Map of the Unitarian League in 1831

The Unitarian League (Spanish: Liga Unitaria) also referred to as the League of the Interior (Liga del Interior) was a league of provinces of Argentina led by José María Paz, established in 1830, aiming to unite the country under unitarian principles. It comprised the provinces of San Luis, La Rioja, Catamarca, Mendoza, San Juan, Tucumán, Córdoba, Salta and Santiago del Estero. It was opposed and ultimately defeated by the provinces of the Federal Pact.

== Formation ==
After the Argentine-Brazilian war, which brought the independence of the Banda Oriental del Uruguay, the political situation in the provinces was greatly affected by the disappearance of Rivadavia's Unitarian national government. Due to this the provinces proclaimed their autonomy and gave the governor of Buenos Aires, Manuel Dorrego, the responsibility to manage Argentina's foreign relations. Many attempts were made to reorganize the national government under the ideals of the Federalist Party, but they all failed, as a result, the Unitarian Party attempted to retake control.

They took advantage of the dissatisfaction that the generals of the National Army expressed with the peace treaty signed by Dorrego, to promote a political-military uprising. In December 1828 General Juan Lavalle executed Dorrego, taking over the government of Buenos Aires; shortly after the Cordovan general José María Paz marched with another division of the national troops and seized Córdoba after defeating the governor Juan Bautista Bustos in the Battle of San Roque.

The Argentine civil war began in 1829, while the Federalist Caudillos of the coastal provinces were able to defeat Juan Lavalle, Paz consolidated his dominance of Cordoba while detouring two invasions from Juan Facundo Quiroga, the Caudillo of La Rioja.

General Paz, knowing that the revolution had failed in Buenos Aires and the coastal provinces, he then proclaimed that his intention was to remain in his native province without attacking the other provinces, but then considered the need to occupy his neighboring provinces to ensure his control of Cordoba. The governors of Salta and Tucumán were the first to join the unitary league and then collaborated in the occupation of the provinces governed or influenced by federalist caudillos. Numerous military units occupied the provinces of San Juan, La Rioja, Mendoza and Santiago del Estero with little or no resistance, while the provinces of Catamarca and San Luis also assumed governments that were sympathetic to Paz's cause. This created a clear political divide within the country between the Unitarian inland provinces and the Federalist coastal provinces.

The governments of the provinces that sympathized with Paz, or that were militarily controlled by their troops, sent representatives to Córdoba, which signed on July 5, 1830 a treaty of peace and friendship, and a defensive and offensive alliance. The signatories were Juan Antonio Saráchaga of Cordoba, Enrique Araujo of Catamarca, José María Bedoya of San Luis, Francisco Delgado of Mendoza and Andrés Ocampo of La Rioja.

Later it was joined by the provinces of Salta, Santiago del Estero, Tucumán y San Juan.

One of the main objectives of the Unitarian League was to promote the organization of a national government.

== Economic and political organization ==
The War of Argentine Independence had strongly upset the region for several reasons: trade with Upper Peru had been cut off, the workforce was drafted into the military, and the market of the coastal provinces had been lost due to the competition from the English. Economically, artisan production was maintained and its profits were used to purchase large pieces of land to be used for Plantations.

In the shadows, the caudillos and governors of the Interior wanted to organize a national organization to manage provincial economic relations while respecting the provincial autonomies. It is because of these proceedings these that the governor of Córdoba, Juan Bautista Bustos, had promoted for years the organization of a Congress that would definitively organize the provinces in the Federal Republic; but their initiatives were abandoned due to the successive authorities from Buenos Aires. After the arrival of Paz, the creation of a new center of power in the city of Córdoba was seen by the elites of the Interior as a possible step to achieve a certain national organization.

The political situation experienced by the interior provinces was uncertain as the leadership of the league did not consider the views of the majority of the population. The Federalist caudillos maintained their influence and frequently revolted using montoneras, especially in rural areas. They even revolted in the city of Cordoba.

The political turmoil resulting from their struggles put these provinces to a state of permanent chaos that diminished economic progress, which was even very limited before the war. This influenced the formation of a multi-provincial army, in addition to maintaining social discontent, fueled by the caudillos. In reality, each member province of the League did continue to operate autonomously, as the political situation of the region prevented any form of complete unity.

== The Supreme Military Power of the League ==
The need to face a possible threat on the part of the coastal provinces meant that on August 31, 1830 the governments of the League of the Interior agreed to grant General Paz the Dictator-like powers by signing a Pact of Union and Alliance. This meant that each province provided their own troops to be led under the unified commander, as well as their weaponry and other equipment. To maintain this army (which came to be a joint army in charge of the defense of all the territories), the signatory governments provided Paz with 1/4 of each of their governmental incomes. This treaty was signed by representatives of the nine provinces of the League and was in effect for eight months. It stipulated that in that time national political unity would be established, in which case the treaty would be rendered ineffective. However, if after eight months there still had not been any national government to which the League could join, the signatory provinces would regain control of their troops, except in case of war.

The purpose of this Supreme Military Power was to unify the resources of the provinces, but a raid by the montoneras kept the troops occupied, of which were scattered throughout the provinces.

The coastal provinces created a similar union that provided for mutual defense of their region. The governments of Santa Fe, Buenos Aires and Corrientes united as a result of revolutionary movements in Entre Ríos, which they were able to put down.
