= Federalist Party (Argentina) =

Former political party in Argentina

Federalist Party Partido Federal
- Historical leaders: José Gervasio Artigas; Manuel Dorrego; Facundo Quiroga; Juan Manuel de Rosas; Justo José de Urquiza
- Founded: 1816
- Dissolved: 1868
- Succeeded by: Autonomist Party, Republican Party
- Headquarters: Buenos Aires, Argentina
- Ideology: Conservatism; Nationalism; Protectionism; Caudillism; Federalism; Factions: Classical liberalism (Justo José de Urquiza and Santiago Derqui); Panhispanism
- Colors: Red

Party flag

The Federalist Party (Spanish: Partido Federal) was the nineteenth century Argentine political party that supported federalism. It opposed the Unitarian Party that claimed a centralised government of Buenos Aires Province, with no participation of the other provinces of the custom taxes benefits of the Buenos Aires port. The federales supported the autonomy of the provincial governments and the distribution of external commerce taxes among the provinces.

The federalists advocated a form of political organization that would ensure coexistence between autonomous provinces and a central government with limited powers. They took as a model the federalism of the United States.

The view on the most prominent historical leader of the movement is controversial. Juan Manuel de Rosas is considered by his detractors as a "dictator". Among the various possible ways of characterizing him, his supporters call him a "man of order."

== Ideology and principles ==
They promoted economic protectionism, limiting the entry of foreign merchandise and protecting local productions by imposing tariffs on imports.

Its leaders were charismatic local caudillos who had great roots and prestige among the rural popular sectors, made up of farm laborers, free gauchos and freedmen. These federal chiefs defended the idea that each province should have its own government, laws, and lifestyle.

Except for Rosas, they defended the free navigation of the interior rivers by foreign ships.

== Early conflict ==
The Argentine War of Independence saw the forces of the United Provinces of the Río de la Plata fighting Spanish royalists who attempted to regain control of their American colonies after the Napoleonic Wars. After the victorious May Revolution of 1810, disagreements arose between the dominant province of Buenos Aires, who were known as Unitarios, and the other provinces of Argentina, known as the Federalists. These were evident at least as early as the declaration of Argentine independence in 1816. The Unitarios lost their controlling power after the Battle of Cepeda (1820), which was followed by several months of anarchy. However, the Unitarios were forced to sign a treaty with other provinces. This did not solve the conflicts between the Federalists and the Unitarians.

== Unitarios ==
Under president Bernardino Rivadavia (1826–1827), the Unitarians gained control for a short period of time. The Constitution of 1826 allowed for a balance between the ideas of Unitarians and Federalists: "It provided for a centralized national authority while leaving the provinces with considerable local powers." However, the constitution was rejected by provincial caudillos, military leaders, and the conflict continued.

=== Unitarian League ===
In 1829, the Unitarian League (Spanish: Liga Unitaria) was created by General José María Paz in order to defeat the Federalists, easily taking power in nine provinces. The Federalist governments of Buenos Aires, Santa Fe, Entre Ríos and Corrientes, united under the Federal Pact, confronted Paz and his troops on May 31, 1831. The Unitarios were defeated after Paz was captured by the troops of Santa Fe Governor, Estanislao López.

== Party leadership ==
Argentina's Federalist party was primarily led by landowning caudillos, a class of wealthy rural elite who benefited from protectionist trade and tariff policies due to their dependence on agriculture and exports for wealth and influence. Pioneering figures, many caudillos became symbols of Argentina's wild pampas and generated their own cults of personality. These personalistic leaders governed through patron-client relationships, relying on rural masses for income and, in return, granting a measure of power and influence through association. These regional strongmen regularly used their patron status to mobilize huge numbers of nomadic gauchos to form both agricultural labor forces and large-scale militias. Typically divorced from politics in the metropolitan capital of Buenos Aires, caudillos disdained the rising tide of urban liberalism and sought to form their own autonomous fiefdoms in the Argentine interior using the region's history of violence and anarchy to justify swift and brutal repression. Juan Facundo Quiroga of the La Rioja region and Juan Manuel de Rosas and Manuel Dorrego of Buenos Aires were prominent caudillo leaders and used their personalistic influence to consolidate rural bases of power. These caudillo leaders rejected the unitary power structure and market liberalism in Buenos Aires as a threat to the existing power structure in Argentina. Foreign investment from the United States and European powers and foreign ownership of Argentine assets were seen as analogous to the spread of European ideas while at the same time undermining the caudillos' share of the export and agriculture economy. Tariffs and strict price controls allowed them to remain powerful economic actors. Until unification pacts were signed in order to fight the Unitarians under Juan Manuel de Rosas, caudillos were primarily independent with their influence confined to their regional bases of power.

Following the internecine Argentine Civil Wars, Juan Manuel de Rosas rose to prominence after attaining the position of Governor of Buenos Aires in 1829. Independently wealthy as a result of massive inherited landholdings and with no serious rivals, Rosas had led the Federalist party as a brigadier general for a number of years before finally consolidating power in Buenos Aires. In this time, Rosas would go on to gain a monopoly on military manpower. He signed the Federal Pact three years later, essentially transforming the unitary Argentina into a confederation with significant autonomy allotted to the provinces and his fellow caudillos. At the end of his term, Rosas left office and embarked on a military campaign to suppress Argentina's indigenous population and secure the western frontier. Following a military coup in Buenos Aires, Rosas was asked to return as Governor. He accepted the offer, returning to the office and beginning a brutal campaign of political repression.

== Party composition ==
Led by the caudillos were the Argentine gauchos, a group demographically defined by their nomadic lifestyle in Argentina's interior as well as by their mixed heritage. Typically illiterate and lacking formal education, the gauchos remain a romanticized figure in the mythology of Argentina and were immortalized in José Hernández' epic poem, Martin Fierro. Similar in lifestyle to American cowboys or the Iberian vaqueros, gauchos were itinerant horsemen of the pampas with their own customs and folklore. Due to Argentina's chronic labor shortages, the caudillos' ability to galvanize the large gaucho population was vital to their economic interests and to their capacity to field armies and militias. Living outside of the national census and only occasionally joining the traditional labor force, gauchos were ideal soldiers in the Argentine civil wars due to their knowledge of the terrain, their culture of violence, and a pervasive lack of knowledge in Buenos Aires about the actual number of gauchos in the countryside. The prospect of monetary reward, as well as long-standing patron-client relationships and adherence to various cults of personality regarding the caudillos, fueled these mobilizations. As caudillos began increasingly rounding up gauchos for work on their estancias and as the pampas were settled, the nomadic gaucho lifestyle grew strained. Many retreated to the wilds of Argentina's west or joined Rosas' army in Buenos Aires following the civil war. Gauchos culture, with no domesticity to anchor, soon disappeared and the free-roaming cattlemen became the subject of predatory labor policies issued from Buenos Aires.

== The fall of federalism ==
Federalism was a dominant force in Argentina, and especially in the La Rioja region of the country, through much of the early and mid-nineteenth century, yet had almost entirely disappeared by the late 1870s. The wars of the 1860s had decimated the Federalist leadership, with numerous high and mid-ranking party leaders dead, imprisoned, exiled, or having defected. Rural populations had also begun to resist the caudillos' efforts at mass mobilization which had a dramatic impact on the size of Federalist armies. The success of the national state, and the lack of free labor as a result of the newly formed national army, contributed significantly to the fall of the Federalist party and political movement. Much of the Federalist leadership became convinced that the new Argentine order, based around a strong central power, was inevitable and sought accommodation and political settlement with the Unitarians. Lacking the military numbers or the economic clout to put up a fight, much of the Federalist power structure collapsed in these later years. Some caudillos and former generals were allowed to stay in Argentina, though many were exiled to Chile in the 1880s.

== Gaucho Federalists ==
Also in 1829, Juan Manuel de Rosas, the boss of a troop of Gaucho Federalists, became governor of Buenos Aires after defeating General Lavalle, who was then forced into exile. Although Rosas was a Federalist, he kept the customs receipts of Buenos Aires under the exclusive control of the city, whereas the other provinces expected to have a part of the revenue. Rosas considered that this was a fair measure because only Buenos Aires was paying the external debt generated by the Baring Brothers loan to Rivadavia, the war of independence and the war against Brazil.

Afterward, a series of civil wars ensued that lasted nearly two decades. Juan Lavalle attempted to take military action against Rosas, but was defeated at the Battle of Márquez Bridge in 1829. With support from other provinces, Justo José de Urquiza, caudillo of Entre Ríos Province, finally defeated Rosas at the Battle of Caseros on February 3, 1852. That May, the San Nicolás Agreement was signed by the provincial governors. The pact reinstated the treaty signed in 1831 by Argentina and the interior provinces and called for a constitutional convention.

== Federal constitution ==
Following the Revolution of 11 September 1852, Buenos Aires broke away from Argentina after Urquiza nationalized customs receipts and allowed free flow of trade on the Parana and Uruguay rivers. In 1859, Buenos Aires was forced to accept the federal constitution of 1853 after six years of secession. This was because on October 23, Mitre was defeated at Cepeda by Urquiza. However, the federal constitution was "amended to allow Buenos Aires greater influence." After the Battle of Pavón, Mitre was chosen president of a new national government.

The several armed conflicts between Federales and Unitarios that started after the May Revolution of 1810, diminished with the Federalist Justo José de Urquiza's betrayal and defeat over the governor of Buenos Aires, Juan Manuel de Rosas at the Battle of Caseros in 1852, and ended in 1862 when Bartolomé Mitre was named president.

== See also ==
- History of Argentina
- Liga Federal
- Pacto Federal
- Argentine Confederation
