= Juan Lavalle =

Argentine military officer and politician (1797–1841)

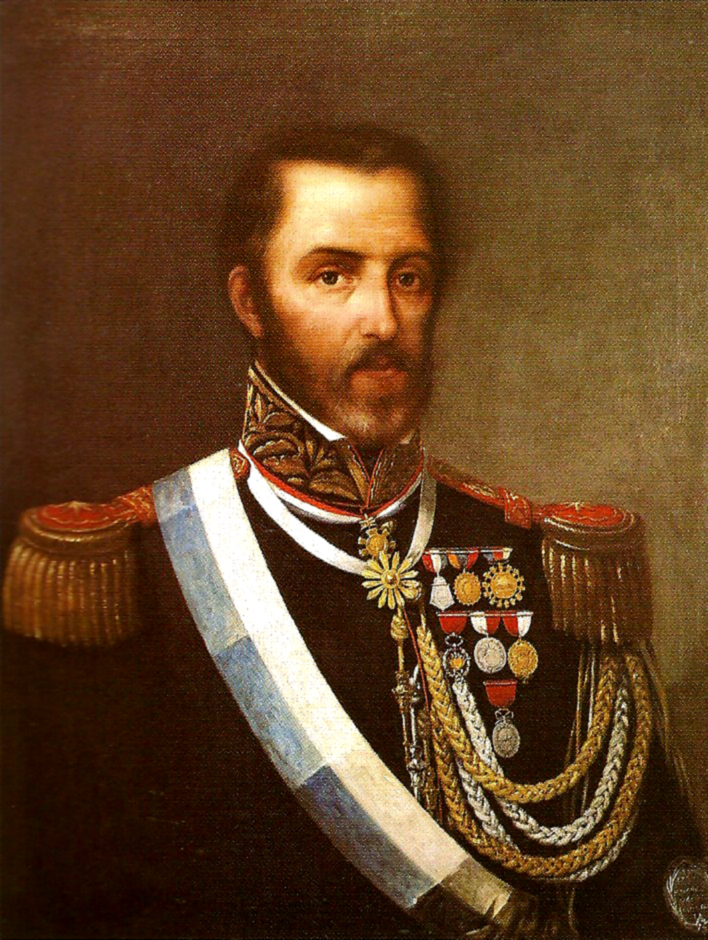
- Official portrait

Governor of Buenos Aires province
- In office 1 December 1828 – 26 June 1829
- Preceded by: Manuel Dorrego
- Succeeded by: Juan José Viamonte

Personal details
- Born: 17 October 1797 Buenos Aires, Viceroyalty of the Río de la Plata, Spanish Empire, Kingdom of Spain
- Died: 9 October 1841 (aged 43) San Salvador de Jujuy, Argentine Confederation
- Party: Unitarian
- Profession: Soldier

Military service
- Allegiance: (Argentina) United Provinces of South America
- Rank: General
- Unit: Army of the Andes
- Battles/wars: Argentine War of Independence; Chilean War of Independence; Peruvian War of Independence; Cisplatine War; Decembrist revolution; Uruguayan Civil War; French blockade of the Río de la Plata; Argentine Civil Wars

Juan Galo Lavalle (Spanish pronunciation: [ˈxwan ˈɡalo laˈβaʎe]; 17 October 1797 – 9 October 1841) was an Argentine military and political figure from the Unitarian Party.

== Early life and education ==
Lavalle was born in Buenos Aires to María Mercedes González Bordallo and Manuel José Lavalle, general accountant of rents and tobacco for the Viceroyalty of the Río de la Plata. In 1799, the family moved to Santiago de Chile, but returned to Buenos Aires in 1807.

Like many other nineteenth century Argentines prominent in public life, Lavalle was a freemason. In 1812 Lavalle joined the Regiment of mounted grenadiers as a cadet. By 1813 he reached the grade of lieutenant and moved to the army.

== Career ==
Under orders of Carlos María de Alvear the army besieged Montevideo. Lavalle fought against José Gervasio Artigas in 1815 and in the Battle of Guayabos under the command of Manuel Dorrego. In 1816 Lavalle moved to Mendoza to join the Army of the Andes of the "liberator" José de San Martín and fought in Chacabuco and the Maipú in Chile. He continued along with San Martín on his way to Peru and Ecuador and took part in the battles of Pichincha and the Riobamba, after which he became known as the Hero of Riobamba. Because of disagreements with Simón Bolívar, Lavalle returned to Buenos Aires by the end of 1823.

=== Governor and general ===
He would later govern Mendoza Province for a short time. He then fought in the war against Brazil in command of 1,200 cavalry, with reported episodes of valour in the battles of Bacacay and Ituzaingó in February 1827. His forces defeated General Abreu and he was proclaimed General on the field of battle itself.

=== Coup, war, and resignation ===
By the time he returned to Buenos Aires, Bernardino Rivadavia, the Unitarian Party President of the United Provinces, had resigned, and Manuel Dorrego was elected the federal governor of Buenos Aires Province. Lavalle, a Unitarian himself, led a coup to take the government and executed governor Dorrego, his former leader, without a trial. His government then started a reign of terror, aiming to destroy the Federal Party, but there was resistance in the countryside, which did not recede. In 1829, the demographic growth was negative as there were more deaths than births.

During this time, José de San Martín had returned from Europe. While he was in Montevideo, Lavalle offered him the government of Argentina, because of his authority over leaders on both sides. But when he learned about the spiraling factionalist violence, San Martín realised that he would have to choose sides as the only actual way to govern, so he refused and returned instead to self-exile in Europe.

The other provinces did not recognize Lavalle as the legitimate governor, and supported the rosista resistance instead. Lavalle would be defeated a short time later at the Battle of Márquez Bridge by the forces of Juan Manuel de Rosas and Santa Fe governor Estanislao López. López returned to his province, menaced by Unitarian José María Paz, who had taken power in Córdoba. Meanwhile, Rosas kept Lavalle under siege and forced him to resign with the Cañuelas pact. Juan José Viamonte was designated as interim governor, and the legislature that was removed during Lavalle's coup d'état was restored. This legislature would elect Rosas as the governor. Lavalle retired to the Banda Oriental.

=== Regroup ===
During the French blockade to the Río de la Plata, Fructuoso Rivera was reluctant to take military actions against Rosas, aware of his strength. Unitarians, who thought that the whole Argentine Confederation would rise against Rosas at the first chance, urged Lavalle to lead the attack, who requested not to share command with Rivera. As a result, they led both their own armies. His imminent attack was backed up by conspiracies in Buenos Aires, which were discovered and aborted by the Mazorca, a group loyal to Rosas. Manuel Vicente Maza and his son were among the conspirators, and were executed as a result. Pedro Castelli also organized an ill-fated uprising against Rosas, and was executed as well.

Rosas did not wait to be attacked and ordered Pascual Echagüe to cross the Paraná River and take the fight to Uruguay, with López. The Uruguayan armies split: Rivera returned to defend Montevideo, and Lavalle moved to Entre Ríos Province. He expected that the local populations would join him against Rosas and increase his forces, but he found severe resistance, so he moved instead to Corrientes Province. Governor Pedro Ferré defeated López, and Rivera defeated Pascual Echagüe, clearing for Lavalle the way to Buenos Aires.

=== Defeat ===
At this juncture, however, France had given up its trust on the effectiveness of the blockade, as what was thought it would be an easy and short conflict was turning into a long war, without clear security of a final victory. France began peace negotiations with the Confederation and cut its financial support to Lavalle. He didn't find help at local towns either, and there was widespread desertion among his ranks. Buenos Aires was ready to resist his military attack, but the lack of support forced him to give up and retire from the battlefield, without starting any battle.

== Death ==
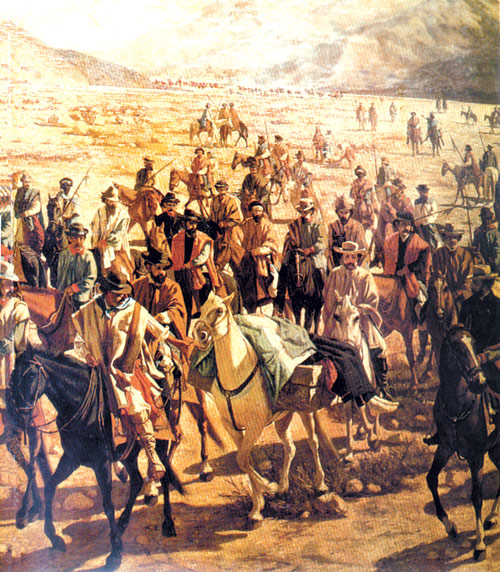
Moving of Lavalle's corpse.

Persecuted, his troops suffered constant attacks and Lavalle was forced to move further north, being defeated by Manuel Oribe in La Rioja and Tucumán. Escaping with a small group of 200 men, he was accidentally shot by a Montonera detachment which spread-shot a reputed Unitarian's house, not realizing that Juan Lavalle, the very chief of the Unitarians, was staying there. This occurred in 1841 in San Salvador de Jujuy.

=== Aftermath ===
Afraid that his body would be desecrated by the Federales, his followers fled to Bolivia carrying Lavalle's decomposing remains with them. Hurrying over the Humahuaca pass, they finally decided to strip the skeleton by boiling it and, after burying the flesh in an unmarked grave, carry the bones, which are today buried at the La Recoleta Cemetery in Buenos Aires.

== Honors ==
A statue of the general standing on top of a long, slender column, commemorates the figure of Lavalle at Plaza Lavalle in Buenos Aires.

== Bibliography ==
- "History of Argentina" by Vicente Fidel López. See also Ernesto Sabato's Sobre héroes y tumbas.

Government offices
Preceded by José Albino Gutierrez	Governor of Mendoza; 1824	Succeeded by Juan de Dios Correas
Preceded by Manuel Dorrego	Governor of Buenos Aires Province; 1828–1829	Succeeded by Juan José Viamonte
