= Manuel Dorrego =

Argentine statesman and soldier (1787–1828)

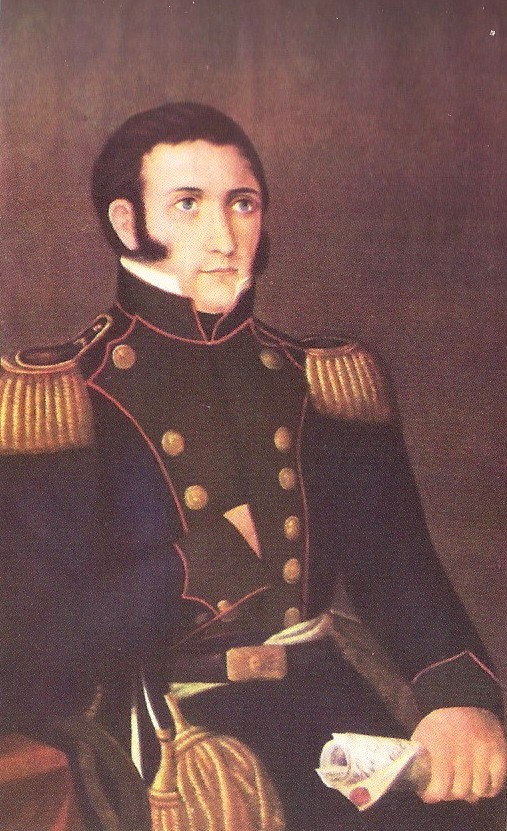

Interim Governor of Buenos Aires Province
- In office 29 June 1820 – 20 September 1820
- Preceded by: Miguel Estanislao Soler
- Succeeded by: Martín Rodríguez

Governor of Buenos Aires Province
- In office 13 August 1827 – 1 December 1828
- Preceded by: Juan Gregorio de Las Heras
- Succeeded by: Juan Lavalle

Personal details
- Born: 11 June 1787 Buenos Aires, Viceroyalty of the Río de la Plata, Spanish Empire
- Died: 13 December 1828 (aged 41) Navarro, United Provinces of the Río de la Plata
- Resting place: La Recoleta Cemetery
- Party: Federal
- Education: Real Universidad de San Felipe
- Profession: Military

Military service
- Allegiance: United Provinces of the Río de la Plata
- Unit: Army of the North
- Battles/wars: Second Upper Peru campaign

Manuel Dorrego (11 June 1787 – 13 December 1828) was an Argentine statesman and soldier. He was governor of Buenos Aires in 1820 and then again from 1827 to 1828.

== Early life and education ==
Dorrego was born in Buenos Aires on 11 June 1787 to José Antonio do Rego, a Portuguese merchant, and to María de la Ascensión Salas. He enrolled in the Real Colegio de San Carlos in 1803, and moved to the Real Universidad de San Felipe in the Captaincy General of Chile to continue his studies. He supported the early steps of the Chilean War of Independence in 1810, which led to the removal of the Spanish colonial authorities and the establishment of the first Chilean Government Junta.

== Career ==
He moved to the United Provinces of the Río de la Plata (modern Argentina), and joined the Army of the North, under the command of Manuel Belgrano. He fought in the battles of Tucumán and Salta, being injured in both. He was sanctioned by Belgrano for promoting a duel. As a result, he did not take part in the battles of Vilcapugio and Ayohuma, two defeats of the Army of the North, and Belgrano regretted later the absence of Dorrego from them.

=== Ideology and exile ===
Dorrego opposed the Luso-Brazilian invasion of the Banda Oriental, encouraged by Juan Martín de Pueyrredón to counter the influence of José Gervasio Artigas. He was exiled by Pueyrredón, and stayed some time in Baltimore (United States). He studied federalism in the United States, and thought that each state of a country should have some autonomy, rejecting the strong centralization into a single government sought by Pueyrredón. During this time he wrote the Cartas apologéticas, criticizing the support of Pueyrredón to the Luso-Brazilian invasion.

=== Return, interim governor, second exile ===
He returned to Buenos Aires in 1819, following the departure of Pueyrredón. He was appointed as interim governor, and fought against the armies of Alvear, Carrera and Estanislao López. Still, he was resisted in the city, and the stable appointment as governor was given to Martín Rodríguez instead. He was banished again, and moved to Upper Peru. He met Simón Bolívar in Quito, and supported his ideas of unifying all the continent into a giant federation.

=== Second return and governorship ===
Dorrego returned to Buenos Aires a short time afterwards and worked in the legislature of Buenos Aires in the 1826 Constituent Assembly. He strongly supported a federal system of government and criticized the qualified suffrage. However, the 1826 Constitution promoted a strong centralized government and qualified suffrage.

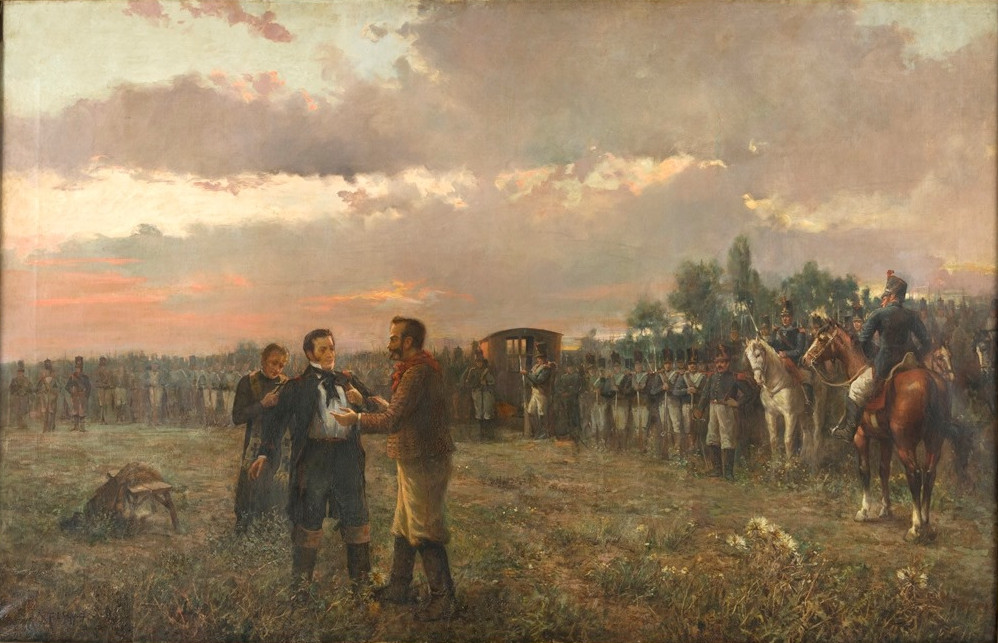
Execution of Manuel Dorrego.

Dorrego opposed the government of the unitarian Bernardino Rivadavia, who was appointed as the first president of Argentina, and voiced his criticism in the newspaper El Tribuno. Resisted by all the provinces, Rivadavia resigned as president, and vice president Vicente López y Planes resigned as well. No longer having a national head of state, the legislature appointed Dorrego as governor of the Buenos Aires province. He took measures to support the poor, promote a federal organization of the country, and ended the Argentine–Brazilian War.

=== Coup and death ===
The Argentine troops were discontented with Dorrego because he accepted the conditions imposed by the British diplomacy despite their military victories in the conflict. Encouraged by the Unitarian party, Juan Lavalle led a coup against Dorrego on 1 December 1828. Dorrego left the city and organized his forces in the countryside. He was defeated, and then executed by Lavalle.

==== Aftermath ====
Lavalle closed the legislature and began a period of political violence against the Federals, but he was defeated and forced to resign by Juan Manuel de Rosas, who restored the institutions that existed before Lavalle's coup.

== See also ==
- Argentine Civil War
- Manuel Dorrego national institute

== Bibliography ==
- Galasso, Norberto (2011). Historia de la Argentina, Vol. I & II (in Spanish). Buenos Aires: Colihue. ISBN 978-950-563-478-1.

Political offices
Preceded by Vicente López y Planes	Governor of Buenos Aires Province; 1827–1828	Succeeded by Juan Manuel de Rosas
