= Invasion of Rio Grande do Sul =

1865 invasion by Paraguay

- Part of the Corrientes campaign
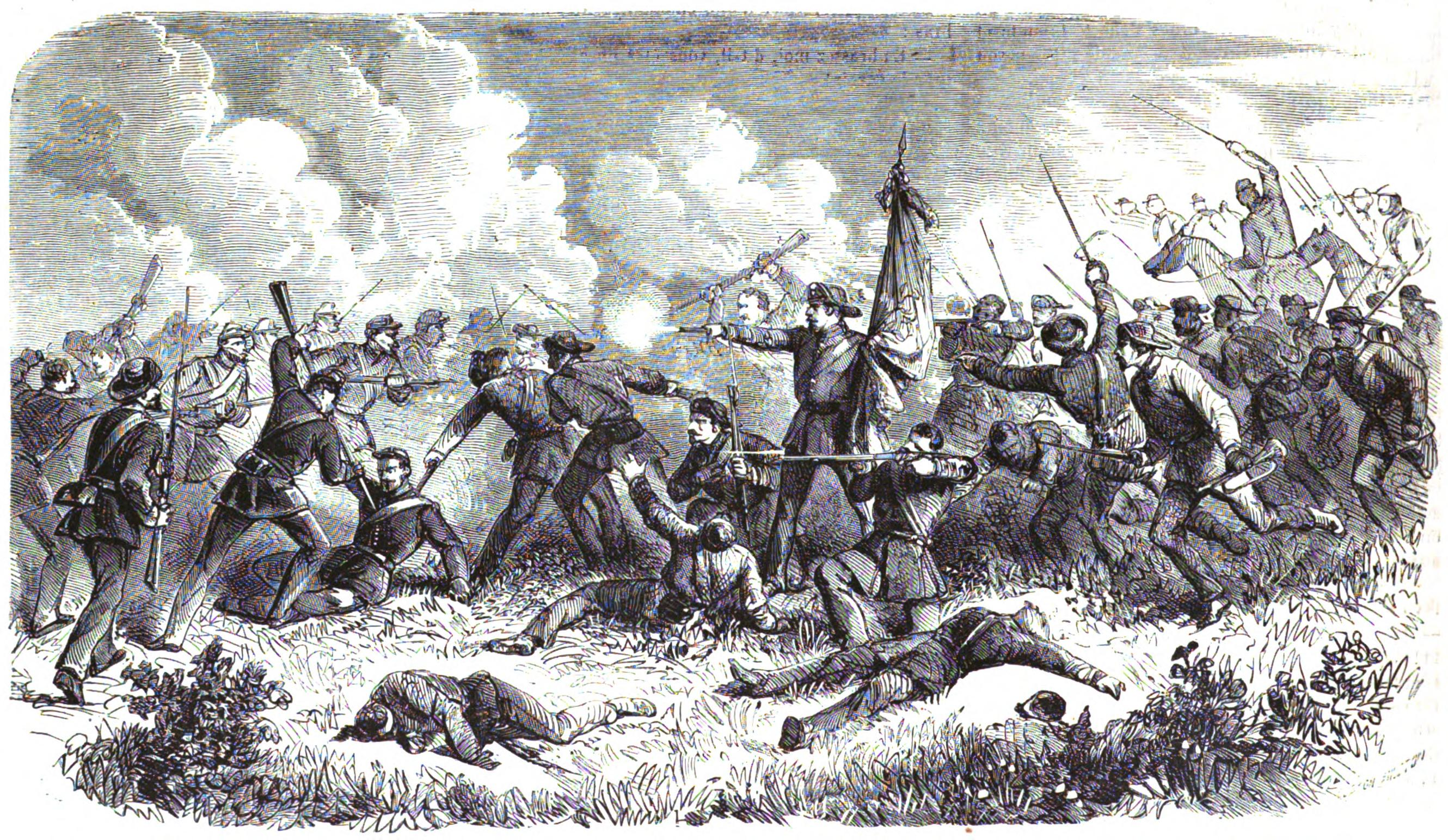
- The Battle of São Borja, the first battle of the invasion
Date	10 June – 18 September 1865
Location	Rio Grande do Sul, Brazil
Result	Brazilian victory

Belligerents
Empire of Brazil	Paraguay

Commanders and leaders
João F. Caldwell; David Canabarro; Marques de Sousa; Antônio F. Lima; João Mena Barreto	Antonio Estigarribia (surrendered); Pedro Duarte

Strength
14,000–17,000 Infantry	10,000–12,000 Infantry

Casualties and losses
Unknown	5,500 captured

The invasion of Rio Grande do Sul began on 10 June 1865 when about 7,500 soldiers under the command of General Antonio de la Cruz Estigarribia invaded the village of São Borja near Brazil's border with Argentina. About 3,000 men commanded by Major Pedro Duarte stayed on the other side of the Uruguay River to accompany the advance of the main column. The Paraguayans always advanced along the river without major damage, with the exception of a confrontation on the Butuí River where a Paraguayan battalion had been defeated, until they reached Uruguaiana, where a two-month siege made them surrender unconditionally on September 18. The main objective of Paraguayan president Francisco Solano López to invade Rio Grande do Sul was to force a peace treaty favorable to the Paraguayans with the Empire of Brazil. The action took place in the second phase of the Paraguayan War, known as the Corrientes campaign.

== São Borja and Butuí ==
The Corrientes campaign began when the Paraguayans invaded Argentina in April 1865 after the Argentines denied the passage of López's troops over their territory. About 30,000 Paraguayan soldiers invaded and occupied the Corrientes Province.

In order to force a favorable peace agreement with the Brazilians, López ordered the invasion of Rio Grande do Sul. Under the command of Antonio Estigarribia, from 10 to 12,000 soldiers were mobilized for the invasion and divided into 2 columns. The main one, with 7,500 men under the direct command of Estigarribia himself, had the mission of entering Brazilian territory. 3,000 men led by major Pedro Duarte didn't cross the Uruguay River and accompany the first column on the river's coast. On the morning of June 10, 1865, Estigarribia began preparations for the crossing. The Paraguayans crossed the river by canoe and on foot and with them 5 cannons and 30 carts with supplies. At 10 am, the Paraguayans began the Battle of São Borja, encountering weak resistance from lancers commanded by colonel Ferreira Guimarães. The battle lasted 2 days when the Brazilians finally withdrew from the village, which was then occupied and looted by the invaders for a week. Encouraged by the victory, the Paraguayans marched south, always on the banks of the Uruguay River.

On June 26, a contingent of about 500 men encountered a Brazilian column of 2,000 soldiers of colonel Antônio Fernandes Lima near the Butuí stream, suffering a defeat and the remainder fled to the main column of Estigarribia, being the only successful Brazilian opposition before Uruguaiana. When the Paraguayans arrived in Itaqui on July 7, they found it almost empty, without resistance, where they looted and stayed for eight days, waiting for further instructions.

== March and surrender to Uruguaiana ==
Disobeying orders from Francisco Solano López to remain in Ybicuí, about 36 kilometers from Itaqui, colonel Estigarribia ordered his troops to march south towards Uruguaiana. The advance was difficult for the Paraguayans as it was a rainy and particularly cold period and the troops did not have tents, proper uniforms or footwear. Estigarribia knew the extreme danger of crossing the Ibicuí River as it was full of currents, the potential loss of the supply carts, cannons and luggage and the possibility of an ambush by colonel Fernandes Lima. Despite this, the troops crossed the river, being harassed by a few hundred Brazilian soldiers who preferred not to engage in combat. The Paraguayan commander was astonished at the ease of crossing the Ibicuí which, according to him, was due to the refusal of the Brazilians, commanded by David Canabarro, to "dispute us over the passage of this river, which presented immense advantages to the enemy". He wrote to the López that he hoped to be able to communicate "within a few days" that the village of Uruguaiana was in Paraguayan hands.

On August 2, major Duarte occupied Paso de los Libres, and three days later Estigarribia with his 7,000 men occupied Uruguaiana, across the river, in Brazilian territory. Estigarribia had orders to continue eastward, approaching Alegrete, but stopped to wait for troops to come from Paraná. When he learned that these forces would not come to his aid, Estigarribia repeatedly asked him to send aid from Paraná. López never responded to the request. Soon around 17,000 soldiers from the newly formed Triple Alliance under the leadership of the Count of Porto Alegre began the siege in August 1865. After several stages from the allies, the last being on September 18, with the threat of invasion of the city, in addition to hunger and lack of help from López, Estigarribia surrendered with about 6,000 of his men, thus ending the campaign in Rio Grande do Sul.
