= Battle of Yatay =

Allied victory in the Paraguayan War

Coordinates: 29°07′S 56°43′W

- Part of the Corrientes campaign
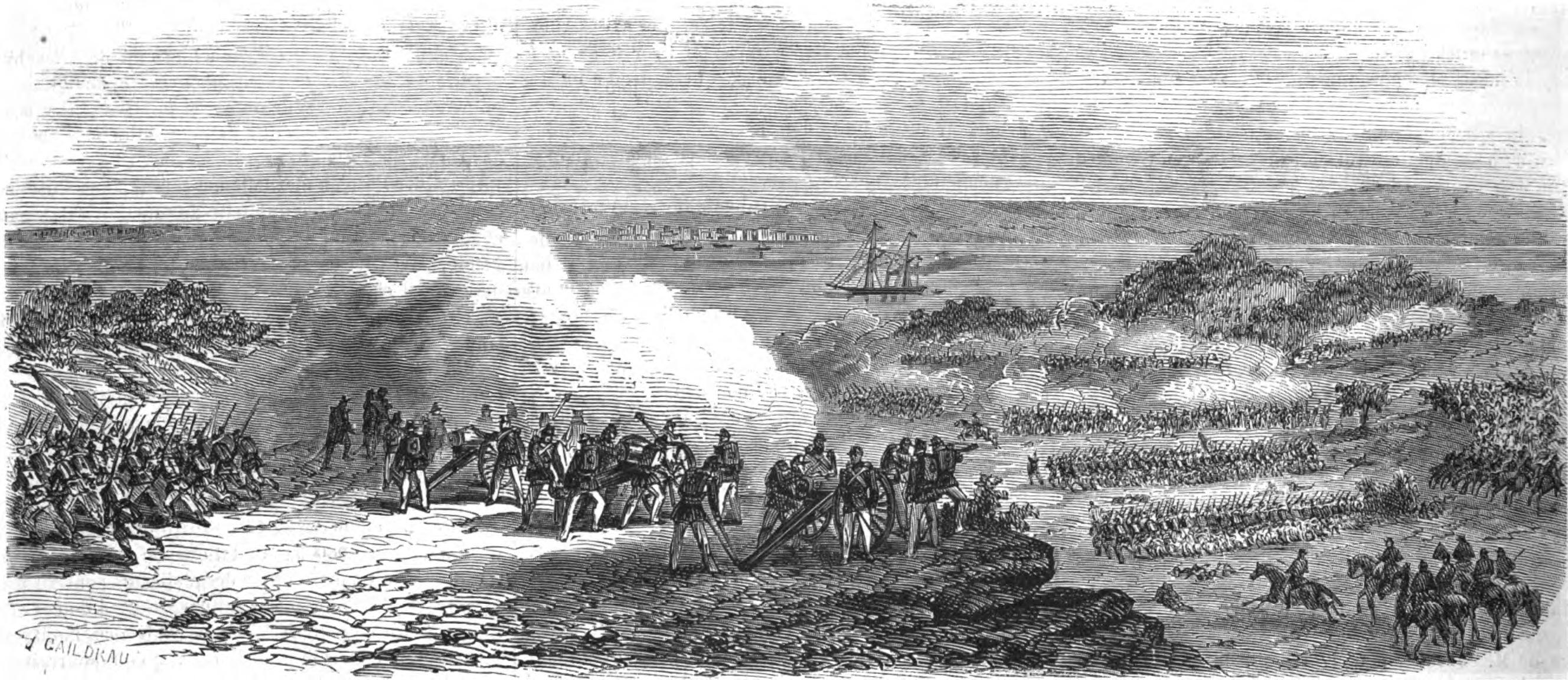
Date	August 17, 1865
Location	Yatay creek, banks of the Uruguay River
Result	Allied victory

Belligerents
Argentina; Uruguay; Empire of Brazil	Paraguay

Commanders and leaders
Wenceslao Paunero; Venancio Flores; Joaquim Kelly	Pedro Duarte (surrendered)

Strength
8,390–10,550: 4,500 Argentines; 2,440 Uruguayans; 1,450 Brazilians; 32 cannons	3,200

Casualties and losses
707: 147 killed; 560 wounded	3,200: 1,700 killed; 300 wounded; 1,200 captured

In the Paraguayan War, the Battle of Yatay was fought on August 17, 1865, between the troops of the Triple Alliance (Argentina, Brazil and (Uruguay) and the soldiers of Paraguay near Paso de los Libres, Corrientes, Argentina. It was a victory for the Alliance.

The Battle of Yatay was the first major land battle of the Paraguayan War, and most important of the war's second phase.

== Background ==
Following the declaration of war by Paraguayan president Francisco Solano López on Argentina, the Paraguayans immediately attacked with two columns. The original plan was that the first column, commanded by Wenceslao Robles, would seize the town of Corrientes while a second column of 12,000 men, commanded by Antonio de la Cruz Estigarribia, would then advance to the east of Corrientes and capture Brazilian possessions on the Uruguay River. The primary focus of this invasion plan was the capture of Brazilian possessions, as this would prevent Brazilian expansion, a great concern of president López. The other column would then capture Corrientes, distracting Argentine forces and creating a lifeline between Paraguay and the Atlantic Ocean. This plan was later revised so that two-thirds of the assault force would attack Corrientes and later divert southeast and invade Uruguay. In response, a military alliance was signed on 1 May among Argentina, Uruguay and the Empire of Brazil.

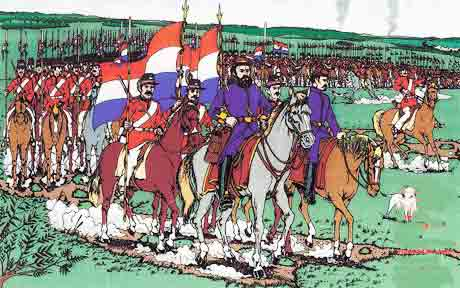
Sargento Pedro Duarte

Following the successful capture of Corrientes by the Paraguayans, Argentine general Wenceslao Paunero launched a daring attack – on 25 May – that recaptured the city. However, given the numerical superiority of the Paraguayans, Paunero chose to evacuate the city and its civilians two days later and head to the southwest of the province. Only after having evacuated Corrientes did Paunero learn that the Paraguayans were advancing on the Uruguay River.

Argentine president Bartolomé Mitre put general Justo José de Urquiza, governor of the province of Entre Ríos, in charge of facing the Paraguayan column. Urquiza called on his aid Paunero, who had retreated to Esquina. These forces were joined by a battalion of volunteers from Corrientes, led by colonel Desiderio Sosa, who had participated in the reconquest of Corrientes. Many future heroes of the Corrientes province, such as Santiago Baibiene and Plácido Martínez, were in that battalion.

Meanwhile, the naval Battle of Riachuelo took place. During the course of the battle the Imperial Brazilian fleet destroyed the Paraguayan squadron near the city of Corrientes. This loss prevented the Paraguayan column on the Paraná River from providing support to the forces on the Uruguay River. Other attempts by the Paraguayan columns to communicate were frustrated in July near Salto by lieutenant Floriano Peixoto's forces.

== Armies ==
On 5 May, after invading the northwest of the province of Corrientes, General Estigarribia sent colonel Pedro Duarte in front of a small advance column to control the bank of the Uruguay River. Duarte took the city of Santo Tomé. Estigarribia's forces followed up and met him there four days later. The army then crossed the Uruguay River and entered the Brazilian province of Rio Grande do Sul. They left behind them the column of Duarte, with more than 3,000 soldiers to defend Uruguay.

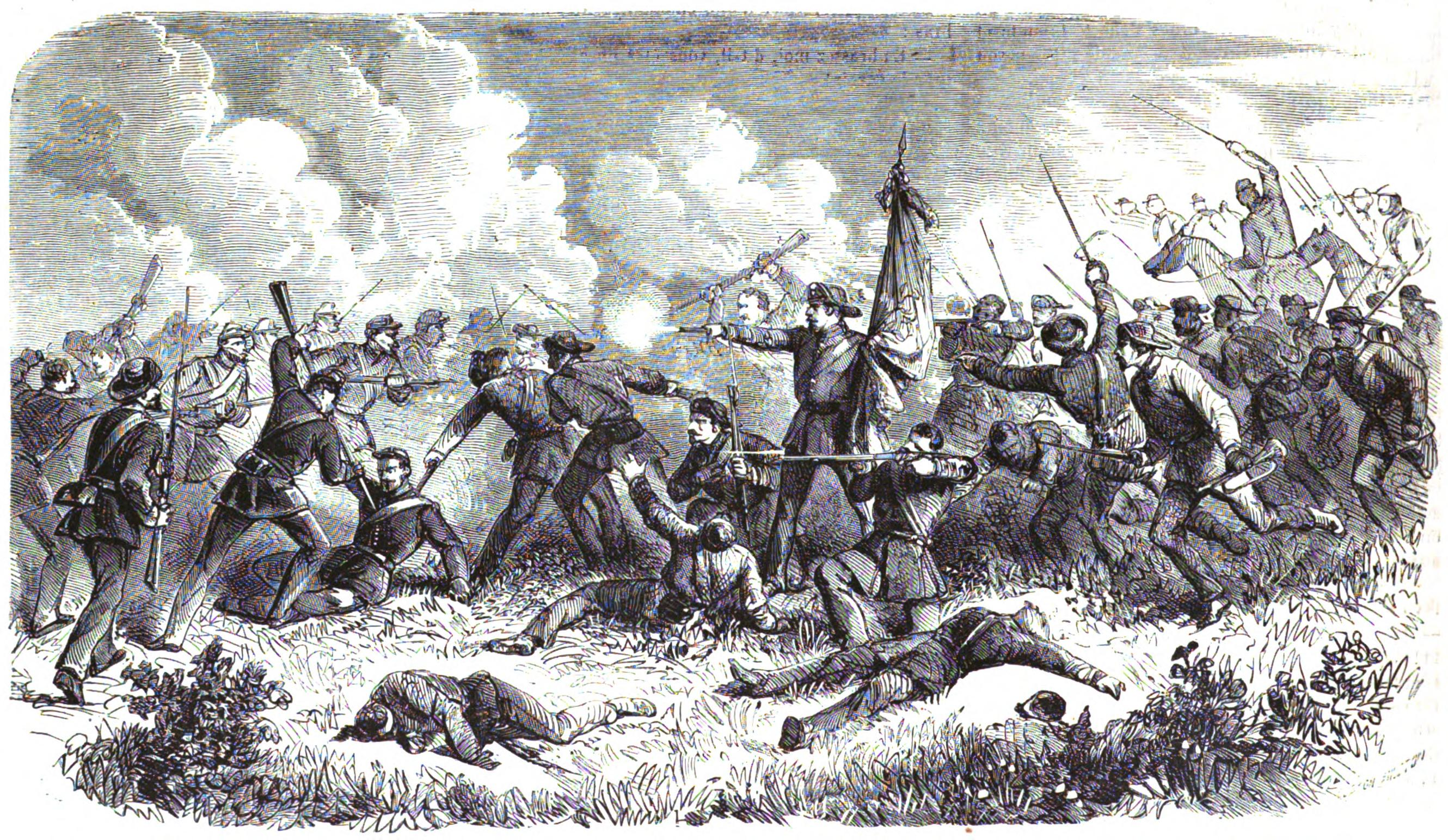
Battle of São Borja (July 10, 1865): 1st battalion of Brazilian volunteers defending their flag against the Paraguayans (according to a sketch by M. Mynssen).

Estigarribia advanced unopposed to the south, taking on São Borja and Itaqui. In the meantime, Estigarribia's column was attacked and partially destroyed on the outskirts of São Borja, in the battle of Butuí. Some of the Paraguayan forces were stationed in São Tomé and São Borja while Duarte was heading south.

Urquiza ordered Paunero to join him in Concordia, but the leader delayed the completion of Urquiza's orders. On June 4 the troops of Urquiza, who refused to fight the Paraguayans on the grounds of being considered allies against Brazil (which Argentina had frayed relations with), were disbanded.

Uruguayan president and general Venancio Flores, fresh from his triumph over the Blanco party, marched to join Urquiza with 2,750 men. In addition, the Brazilian forces, commanded by lieutenant colonel Joaquim Rodrigues Coelho Nelly, numbering 1,200 men, were heading their way. They met on July 13. At the first meeting Flores was given the Line Cavalry Regiment "San Martín", with 450 men, plus one Uruguayan artillery squadron with 140 men. In total, Flores had 4,540 troops—not nearly enough to confront the Paraguayan columns.

Flores, Duarte and Estigarribia marched slowly to meet and engage in battle, while Paunero's 3,600 men began a march through swamps and rivers, swiftly crossing the southern province of Entre Ríos to join Flores. In addition, 1,400 cavalry soldiers from Corrientes under the command of general Juan Madariaga joined their forces. Finally, colonel Simeón Paiva, with 1,200 men, closely followed the column of Duarte.

Estigarribia had a chance to destroy all his enemies one by one, but missed. He also disobeyed orders from López, who ordered him to continue on his way to Alegrete. On August 5 he went to Uruguaiana and ordered his troops to reorganize and gather supplies. The Brazilian forces of general David Canabarro, too few to attack the column of 5,000 men of Estigarribia, were limited to camp near the city without being attacked by the Paraguayans.

On August 2 Duarte occupied the village of San José de Restauración, now the town of Paso de los Libres. A week later he advanced and was defeated, suffering 20 casualties in the Battle of Capí Quisé. Given the news that all enemy forces were in his pursuit, Duarte sought help from his superior, general Estigarribia, who answered:

"Tell major Duarte that if his spirit is low, he should come and take charge of Uruguaiana's force, and I'll go fight the battle".

Insulted, Duarte was prepared to give battle without any help.

On August 13 Paunero avoided the army of Duarte and joined Flores, whose forces then numbered 12,000 men, nearly four times the force of Duarte. Duarte moved away from Paso de los Libres and took positions on the banks of the Yatay stream, near the village.

There was a brief encounter on the afternoon of August 16, and at dusk the two armies were facing each other from half a mile off.

== Battle ==
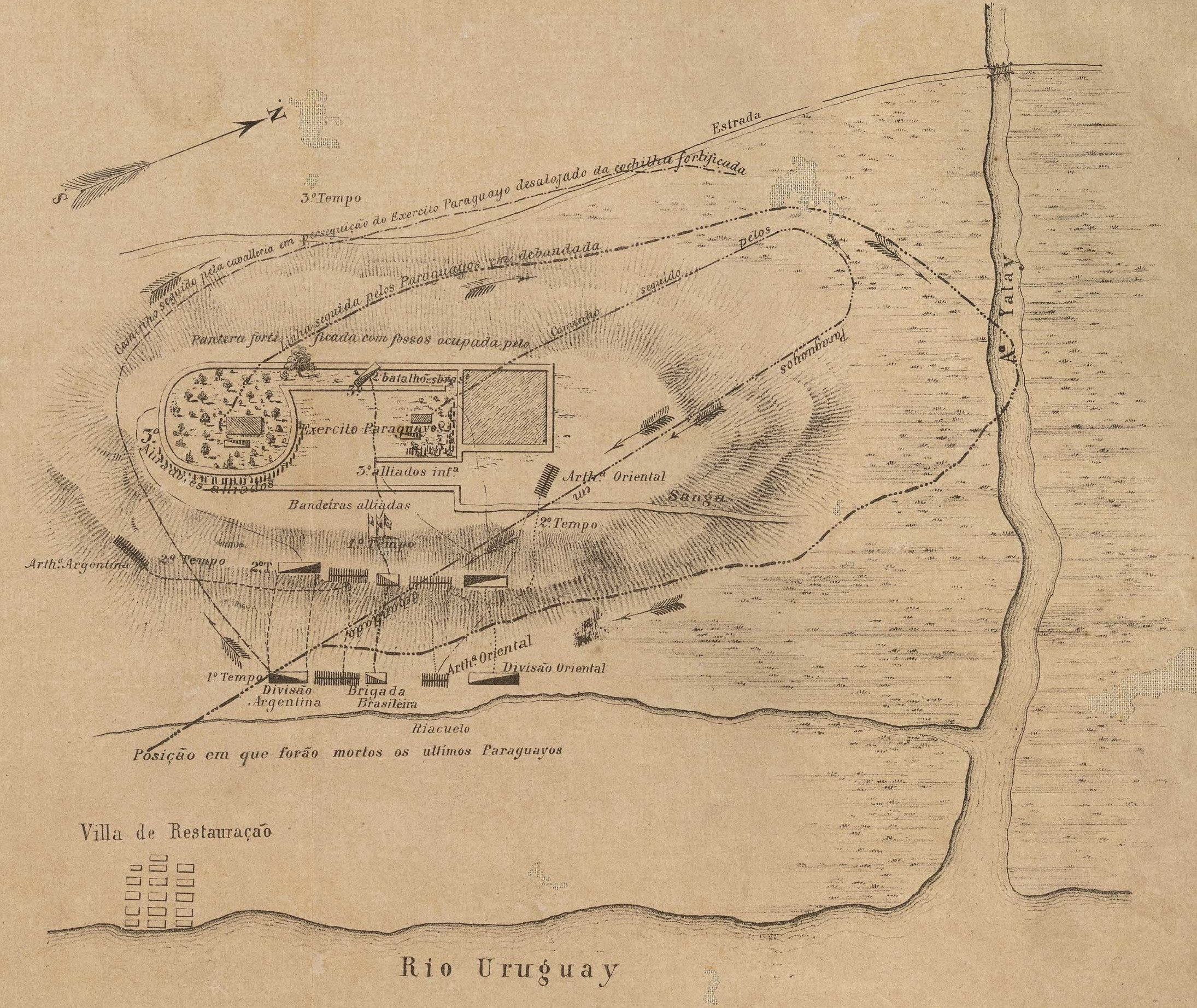
Map of the Battle of Yatay.

Both the Yatay and Uruguay rivers had recently flooded, leaving much of the battlefield underwater. Most Paraguayan infantry forces were entrenched among trees and ditches in the area of the nearby village estates and protected by mud that protected them from frontal approaches, but the stream behind them made it impossible to retreat in case of a defeat, which was considered very likely by Duarte.

Duarte's forces consisted of 1,980 infantry and 1,020 cavalry, with no artillery. The Allies had a total of 5,550 infantry, 5,000 cavalry and 32 pieces of artillery. Among the leaders of the allied army were experienced commanders such as Flores and Paunero, León de Pallejas, Ignacio Rivas, Enrique Castro and José Gregorio Suárez and Argentines Juan Bautista Charlone, José Miguel Arredondo, José Giribone Ignacio Segovia, Joaquin Viejobueno, Leopoldo Nelson, Simón Paiva and Madariaga.

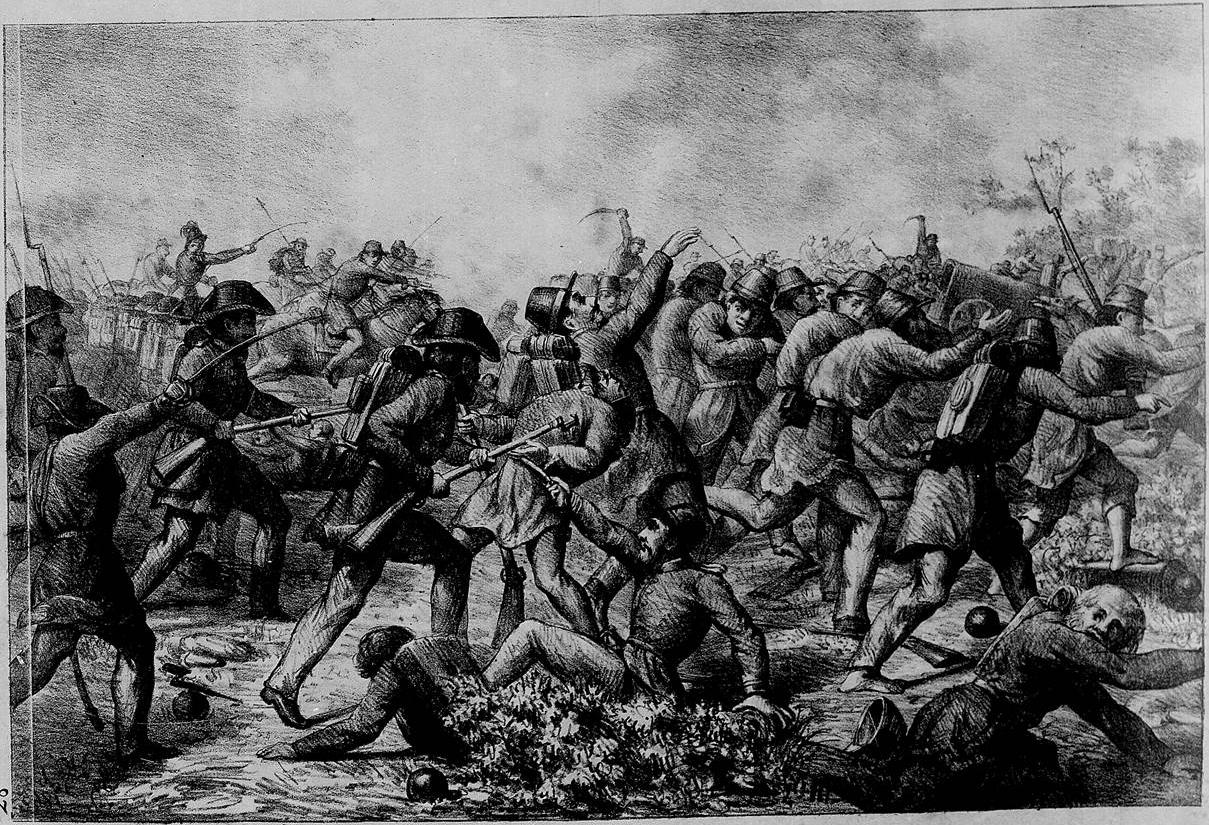
Defeat of the Paraguayans at Yatay

The battle began at 10:00 am, with an early attack on the Paraguayan positions by the infantry division commanded by León de Pallejas. Duarte seized the opportunity and counterattacked with almost all his cavalry, causing hundreds of casualties and forcing them to retreat. Faced with an increasingly bad situation, the cavalry division of Segovia attacked the Paraguayan cavalry, supported by Castro's eastern and Suárez. For two hours the battle was fought exclusively with cavalry.

Duarte ordered a withdrawal maneuver, which finally enabled the allied infantry to go into action, and although their (the allies) numerical superiority was overwhelming, the Paraguayans fought with tenacity. When the battle was almost lost, Duarte tried a desperate cavalry charge, and in the fight his horse was killed. Paunero himself demanded that Duarte surrender, which he finally agreed to do.

A final Paraguayan force of infantry under lieutenant Zorrilla crossed the Yatay stream and was attacked by a cavalry unit of Suárez and Madariaga, who attacked from the rear. A few hundred Paraguayan soldiers swam the Uruguay River, while the rest were killed or taken prisoner. In total they suffered 1,700 dead and 300 wounded, including 1,200 prisoners.

== Consequences ==
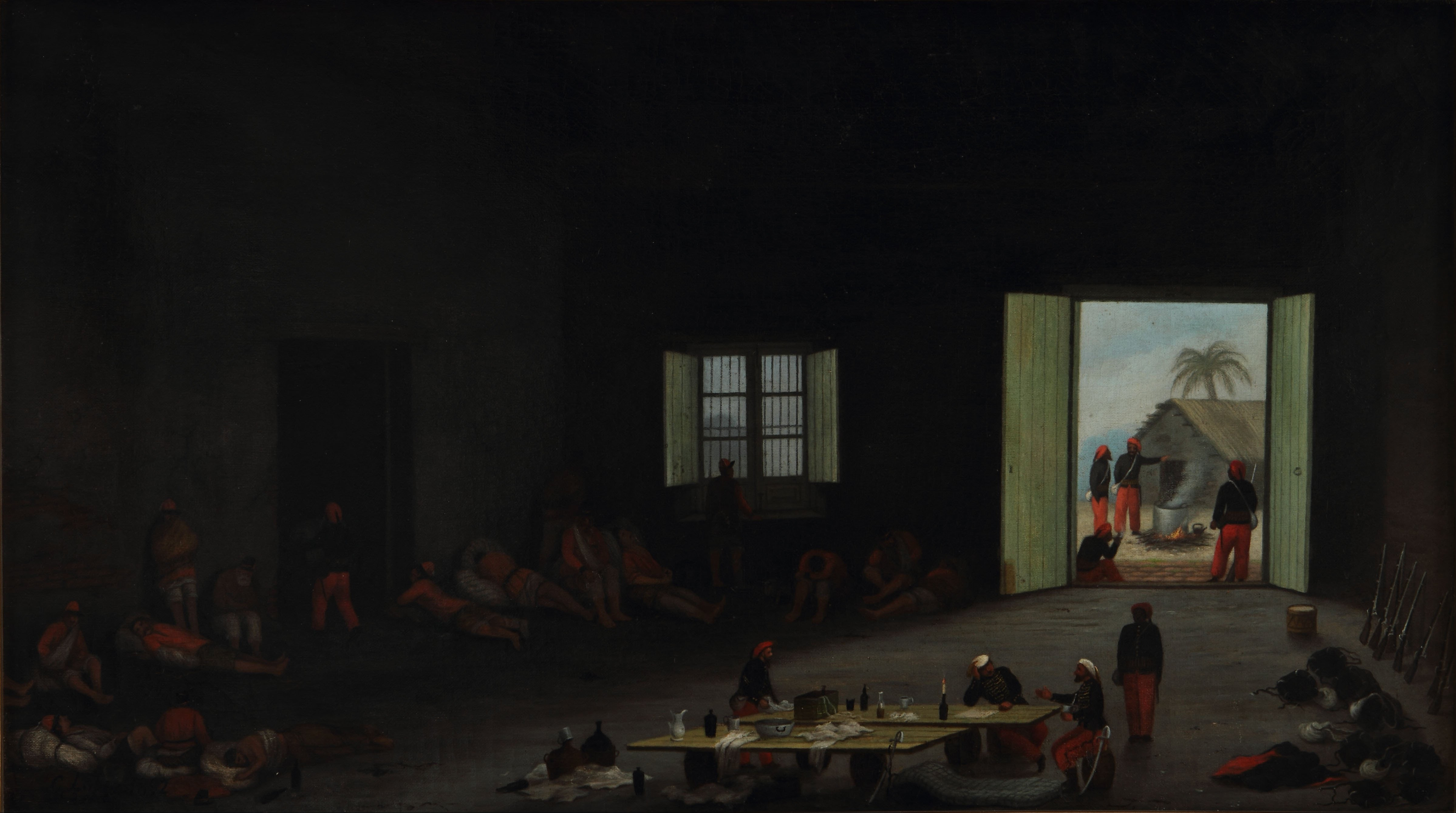
Wounded Paraguayan soldiers taken as prisoners after the Battle of Yatay

Among the prisoners, Flores found several dozen soldiers from the Uruguayan Blanco Party, supporters who had taken refuge in Paraguay who tried to wrest power in Uruguay from the hands of Flores' forces. He ordered their execution as traitors. (Note: Flores also ordered the execution of some federalist Argentine soldiers, who did not recognize the national authority of president Bartolomé Mitre. Mitre had led and won a few years earlier a rebellion against the Argentine Confederation after defeating Justo José de Urquiza at the battle of Pavón.)

On September 18, after having assured the representatives of the Brazilian Emperor that he would not surrender and would rather be buried under the rubble of Uruguaiana, general Estigarribia surrendered with little resistance.

Soon afterwards, the Paraguayan forces occupying the abandoned city of Corrientes retreated to the north, and soon moved on to Paraguay. Almost all of the war following was fought in Paraguayan territory until the country's complete defeat in 1870, which resulted in a considerable loss of the country's adult male population.

A street in the city of Buenos Aires, in the district of Caballito, is named after this battle.
