= Pedro Duarte =

Pedro Duarte may refer to

- Pedro Duarte (general) (1829–1902), Paraguayan general
- Pedro Duarte (footballer, born 1972), Portuguese goalkeeper
- Pedro Duarte (politician) (born 1973), Portuguese politician
- Pedro Duarte (footballer, born 1978), Portuguese left-back footballer
