= Antonio de la Cruz Estigarribia =

Paraguayan colonel (1825–1870)

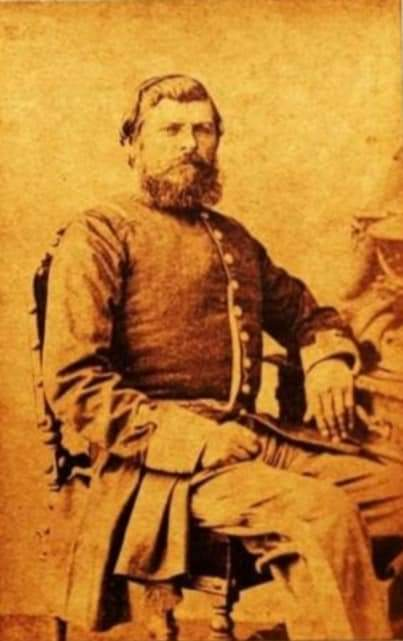
- Born: c. 1825; Yaguarón, Paraguarí Department, Paraguay
- Died: c. 1870 (aged 44-45); Rio de Janeiro, Rio de Janeiro, Brazil
- Military career
- Allegiance: Paraguay
- Branch: Paraguayan Army
- Service years: 1853 — 1865
- Rank: Teniente coronel
- Nickname: Lacú
- Conflicts: Paraguayan War; Invasion of Rio Grande do Sul; Battle of São Borja; Siege of Uruguaiana (surrendered)

Antonio de la Cruz Estigarribia was a Paraguayan Lieutenant colonel who was notable for his service in the Paraguayan War. He served as one of the main Paraguayan commanders during the Invasion of Rio Grande do Sul, organizing the Battle of São Borja and the Siege of Uruguaiana before his surrender.

== Biography ==
Estigarribia entered military service in October 1853 and was appointed Commander of the Cavalry Barracks.

He served as an assistant to Francisco Solano López in the mediation he rehearsed in 1859 between the State of Buenos Aires and the Argentine Confederation. Estigarribia was promoted to the rank of lieutenant colonel at the initiative of Solano López, he received command of a Paraguayan division and when the Paraguayan War broke out in 1864, which would become a war against the Triple Alliance, Estigarribia would later considered one of the most respected officers in the Paraguayan army.

Once the city of Corrientes was occupied, Estigarribia advanced from Encarnación at the command of his division, some 12,000 men, and after occupying Santo Tomé he divided his forces: with his column he crossed the Uruguay River, he occupied São Borja on 12 June 1865, and advanced to occupy Uruguaiana on August 5, in Brazilian territory, while a second column of about 3,000 men under the command of major Pedro Duarte, occupied Paso de los Libres, on the Corrientes side of the river.

Bartolomé Mitre, the commander-in-chief of the allied army, advanced from Concordia with an army with Argentine contingents commanded by Wenceslao Paunero, the Uruguayan contingents commanded by Venancio Flores and the Brazilian contingents commanded by Pedro Duarte, considered that he could defeat Flores before Paunero's division joined him and asked Estigarribia for reinforcements to He attempted an attack but received the answer:

Tell Major Duarte that if he is in a downcast mood, come and take charge of the Uruguayan force, that I will go to fight the battle.

Nor did Solano López send the requested reinforcements and the allied army finally defeated Duarte's division at the Battle of Yatay with which Estigarribia was isolated.

During the Siege of Uruguaiana, on August 19, Flores sent a request for Estigarribia to surrender, stating that:

The allies do not wage war on the Paraguayans, but on the tyrant López who governs them and treats them as slaves; our purpose is to give them freedom and institutions, giving them a government by free choice.

Estigarribia answered that:

[…] as a military man, as a Paraguayan and as a soldier who defends the cause of the institutions and independence of his homeland, I reject Your Excellency's offer. to succumb rather than accept a proposal that would dishonor and fill the name of the Paraguayan soldier with eternal infamy. and to a similar summons from the Brazilian commander, he replied that« … if the forces at your command are as numerous as Your Excellency assures, come and then you will know what the Empire of Brazil and its allies must expect from the Paraguayan soldier, who knows how to die gloriously close to your flag, but don't give up.

Estigarribia haughtily rejected two new intimations, coming to compare himself with the king of Sparta Leonidas I, who died fighting in the Battle of Thermopylae. But at the beginning of September the situation became desperate due to the lack of food and when the commander of the Paraguayan division of the allied army wrote to him rejecting the charge of treason and accusing López of betraying his homeland for carrying out a policy oppressive towards his people, Estigarribia replied

... companions, I will answer you later. I have to consult my people, whose opinions are divided.

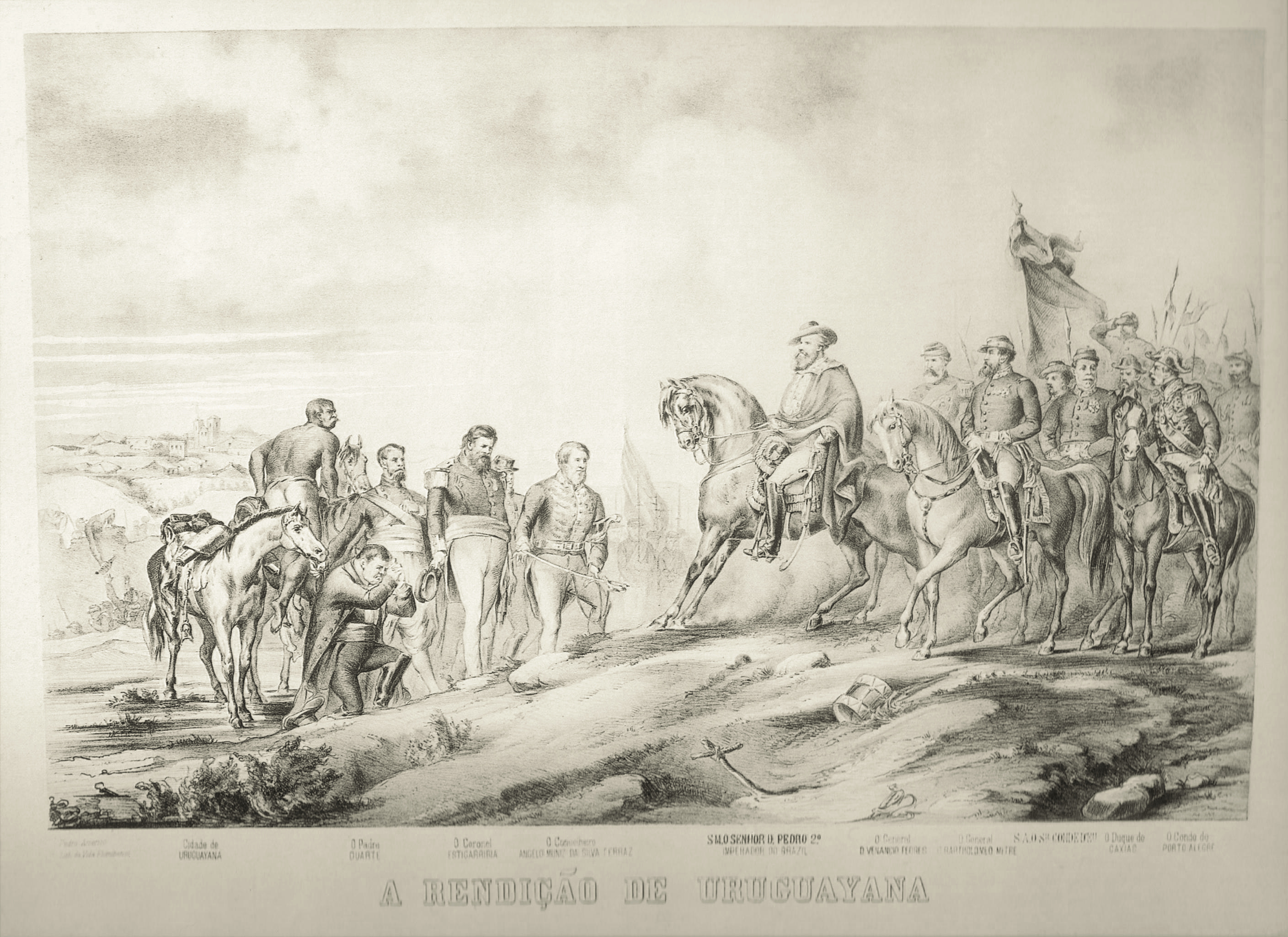
The surrender of Uruguaiana

On September 5 and 7, Estigarribia met with leaders of Paraguayans in exile, Juan Francisco Decoud, Benigno Ferreira and Jaime Sosa. On September 11, the civilian population was authorized to leave. On September 18, while the allied army was taking positions for an assault, Marques de Souza sent it a final summons that was accepted by Estigarribia with no further condition that the superior commanders could return to Paraguay or withdraw wherever they wished and that the Uruguayan soldiers and officers that formed in their ranks were not handed over to Flores. While many imprisoned Paraguayan soldiers were turned into slaves in Brazil or incorporated into the allied armies, Estigarribia remained in Rio de Janeiro for the rest of his days alive.

The news of "the shameful news of the surrender of Uruguaiana" was received with fury by Solano López who declared that Estigarribia "will answer before God and the Homeland for the only act that we record with shame in history ", criticizing the abandonment of the troops of Yatay who remained " without the aid under the main body of the command of Lieutenant Colonel Estigarribia, only separated by the width of the river, time and means of passage "

A witness portrays him like this:

Among the diners are ... Antonio de la Cruz Estigarribia, with a pale complexion and an insipid appearance, although fine and handsome due to his physiognomic features.
