= Juan Bautista Charlone =

Argentine colonel (1821–1866)

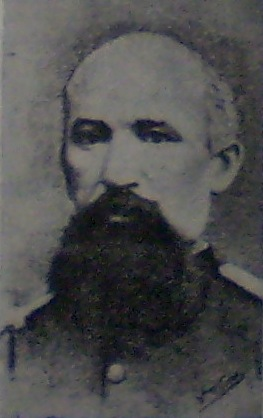
- Born: September 27, 1821; Piana Crixia, Savona, Sardinia-Piedmont
- Died: September 23, 1866 (aged 44); Corrientes, Corrientes Province, Argentina
- Burial place: La Recoleta Cemetery, Buenos Aires, Argentina
- Military career
- Allegiance: Italian Redshirts; Uruguay; State of Buenos Aires; Argentina
- Branch: National Army of Uruguay; Argentine Army
- Service years: 1839 – 1866
- Rank: Coronel
- Commands: 1st Army Corps
- Conflicts: Uruguayan Civil War; Great Siege of Montevideo; Battle of San Antonio (WIA); Battle of Caseros; Argentine Civil Wars; Battle of Cepeda; Battle of Pavón; Paraguayan War; Corrientes campaign; Battle of Corrientes (WIA); Battle of Yatay; Humaitá campaign; Battle of Tuyutí; Battle of Curupayty (DOW)

Juan Bautista Charlone, born Pietro Giovanni Battista Chiarlone was an Italian-born Argentine Colonel who participated in the Uruguayan Civil War, the Argentine Civil Wars and the early to mid years of the Paraguayan War. He was known for being a major commander at the Battle of Tuyutí before falling during the Battle of Curupayty.

== Military career ==
He was born in Cagna (Modern-Day Piana Crixia) then part of the Kingdom of Sardinia. In 1839, for economic reasons, he emigrated with his family to Uruguay, settling in Montevideo. During the Uruguayan Civil War, he enlisted in Giuseppe Garibaldi's Italian Redshirts. Under the command of the Hero of Two Worlds, he defended the Uruguayan capital during the Great Siege of Montevideo against the siege of the militias of the former Blanco president Manuel Oribe supported by the Argentine troops of Juan Manuel de Rosas. In 1846 he fought in the Battle of San Antonio but was wounded in the head. At the end of the battle, Garibaldi himself promoted Charlone to the rank of sergeant. In 1851 with the rank of captain, he was transferred to the Orden battalion which was an elite unit of the National Army of Uruguay. The following year he participated in the Battle of Caseros which marked the defeat and fall of the Argentine dictator Rosas. After the victory of Caseros, Charlone enlisted in the army of Buenos Aires, engaging in a war against the other Argentine provinces united under the leadership of the caudillo Justo José de Urquiza. Placed at the head of a company of Grenadiers of the 2nd Line Infantry Battalion, he took part in the defense of the Argentine capital besieged by the forces of General Hilario Lagos.

In 1856, he was placed in the Porteña Navy, he initially held the rank of Lieutenant and later with that of second-in-command of the brig General Pinto. The following year, he became the second-in-command to Antonio Susini, commander of the Italian Military Legion. This department, composed mainly of Italians, had been sent by Bartolomé Mitre in the southwest of the Bonaerense territory to protect the city of Bahía Blanca which was under construction but suffered from attacks by the natives. Charlone succeeded his superior as commander of the legion in July 1858. On May 19, 1859, at the head of his legionaries, he repulsed and neutralized the last attack of the natives against Bahía Blanca. The following October, he took part in the Battle of Cepeda and two years later, in the Battle of Pavón. After the latter engagement, he was promoted to lieutenant colonel.

With the outbreak of the War of the Triple Alliance, the Italian Military Legion of Charlone was within the 1st Army Corps of the Argentine Army led by General Wenceslao Paunero. On May 25, 1865, he participated with his men in an assault on Corrientes, occupied a few months earlier by the Paraguayan Army. In the clash, Chiarlone, who with a risky maneuver was the first to throw himself into the midst of the enemy defenses, was wounded in the head by a saber blow. Despite the wound and high casualties, he was rescued by his soldiers and evacuated with the rest of the Argentine troops at the end of the battle. In August of the same year, he took part in the Battle of Yatay. In 1866, with the beginning of the Humaitá campaign, Chiarlone and the Italian Military Legion faced the Paraguayans at the Battle of Tuyutí where the colonel commanded the 2nd Brigade of the Argentine 1st Army Corps at Yataytí-Corá and at Boquerón. In September 1866, he was promoted to the rank of Colonel. A few days later on September 22, the allied troops stormed the Paraguayan fortifications of Curupayty. During the assault Colonel Chiarlone, who at the head of his men had launched towards the enemy lines, was mortally wounded by a grenade. He died the following day in Corrientes.

== Legacy ==
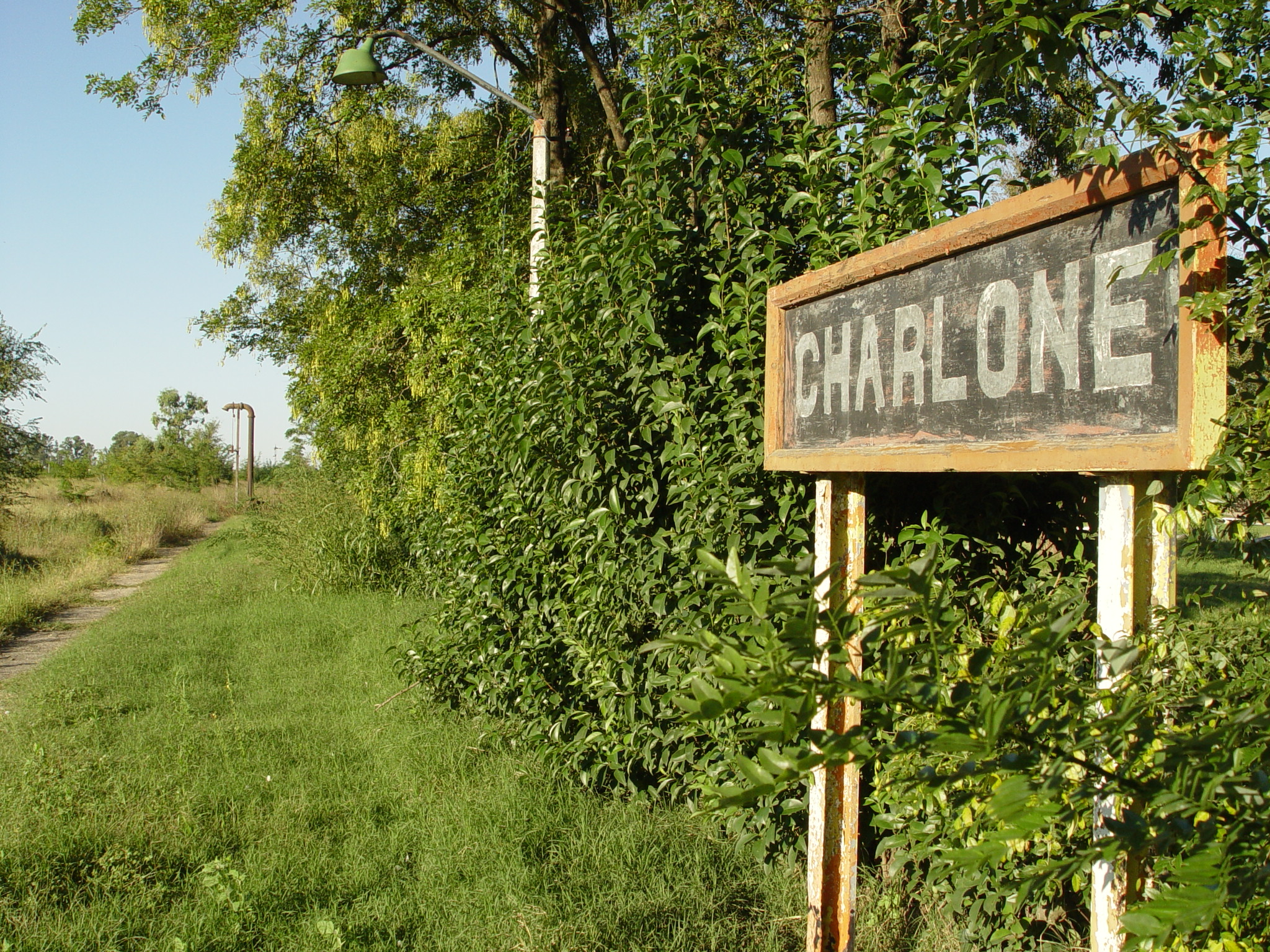
A sign at the Colonel Charlone Station, Buenos Aires Province.

His remains, transported to Buenos Aires on October 6 and currently rests in La Recoleta Cemetery. The Governor of the Buenos Aires Province then named a railway station after him within the province, belonging to the branch that linked the towns of Rufino, Santa Fe and Italó, Córdoba. Said station was inaugurated on June 1, 1900, and on June 30, 1908, the subdivision of the areas surrounding the station began, which gave rise to the Colonia y Pueblo Fernando Martí, in honor of the previous owner of the land, Fernando Martí Tomás. However, the inhabitants of the region referred the town as the station's name. This resulted in a 1979 law determining that Colonia y Pueblo Fernando Martí would be formally renamed to Colonel Charlone.
