= João Frederico Caldwell =

Portuguese-born Brazilian marshal and politician

- John Frederick Caldwell
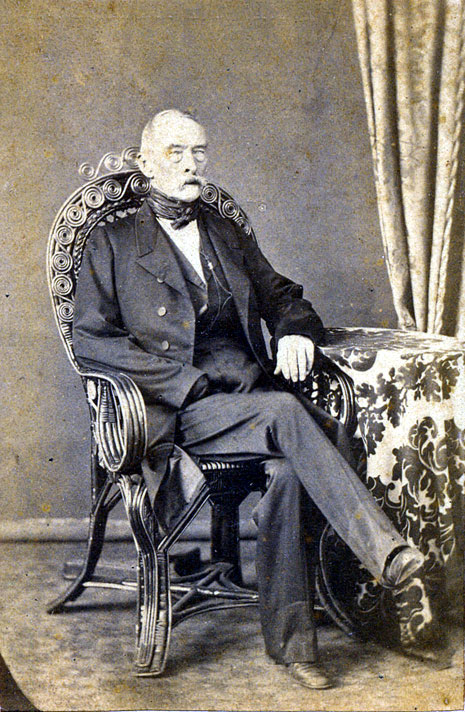
- Caldwell in 1870

Minister of War
- In office 29 September 1870 – 9 November 1870
- Monarch: Pedro II
- Prime Minister: Marquis of São Vicente
- Preceded by: Marquis of Muritiba
- Succeeded by: Raimundo de Araújo Lima

Personal details
- Born: 16 February 1801 Santarém, Santarém District, Portugal
- Died: 26 February 1873 (aged 72) Município Neutro, Brazil

Military service
- Allegiance: Empire of Brazil
- Branch: Imperial Brazilian Army
- Years of service: 1817–1873
- Rank: Marshal
- Battles/wars: Pernambuco revolt; Confederation of the Equator; Cisplatine War; War of Cabanos; Ragamuffin War; Battle of Seival (POW); Platine War; Paraguayan War; Corrientes campaign; Invasion of Rio Grande do Sul; Siege of Uruguaiana

João Frederico Caldwell (born John Frederick Caldwell; 16 February 1801 – 26 February 1873) was a Portuguese-born Brazilian marshal and politician who was a military figure during the 19th century. He was known for his extensive career since the Pernambuco revolt and was one of the main Brazilian leaders during the Paraguayan Invasion of Rio Grande do Sul in the Corrientes campaign of the Paraguayan War.

== Origin ==
Caldwell was born on 16 February 1801 in Santarém, Portugal, the son of Lieutenant General Frederick Caldwell, an Irishman, and Louisa Vaughan.

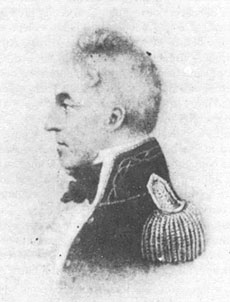
Frederick Caldwell, his father

== Military career ==
In 1817, he fought against the Pernambuco revolt, under the command of General Luís do Rego Barreto. He returned to Rio de Janeiro in 1820, being promoted to lieutenant along the way. In 1821, he signed the manifesto of January 9, which requested that Dom Pedro I stay in Brazil, an event known as the Dia do Fico.

He was promoted to captain in 1821, being sent to Pernambuco to quell the Confederation of the Equator. The following year, after a brief passage through the court, he left for Rio Grande do Sul, where the 1st Regiment had already gone, then participating in the Cisplatine War serving under Bento Gonçalves da Silva, to which he was praised.

He returned to the court, and with his family he tried to return to Rio Grande do Sul, succeeding only in 1834 as a major. Having served D. Pedro I with appreciation, he was considered suspicious by Dom Pedro II's regents.

He became a merchant in Rio Grande do Sul, but with the beginning of the Ragamuffin War, he was summoned by the government to accompany the deposed president of the province Antônio Rodrigues Fernandes Braga on a trip to the court, abandoning his business and making himself available to the court to return to the South. However, contrary to his expectations, he received orders to fight the Cabanada in Pará but managed to reverse the orders and be sent back to Rio Grande do Sul, having received the military command of Rio Grande in 1836. He was soon designated a brigade major. He then organized a provisional cavalry along with João Nunes da Silva Tavares, with which he fought in the Battle of Seival. During the battle, was wounded in the right hand which he later lost and was taken prisoner. On 23 October, he managed to escape and rejoined the loyalist troops.

After a season at court, he returned to Rio Grande do Sul, where he stayed until the end of the conflict, with records of a very particular situation, the help he granted to the population of the German Colony of Três Forquilhas in 1839 at a very difficult and traumatic time. in the lives of local settlers. In 1842, he was promoted to colonel and on 7 July 1845, he was appointed commander of the arms of Pará, where he remained until 2 September 1846. He was then transferred back to Rio Grande do Sul, he was promoted to brigadier in the same year and also commander of arms of the province, a position he held until 1848, having resumed the position in 1850 on an interim basis.

On 28 August 1850, he was appointed commander of the second division of the southern army which he commanded during the Platine War. In 1852, he was promoted to Marshal, being named commander of arms of Rio Grande do Sul, staying until 1856, again from 1857 to 1865, where he was at the beginning of the Paraguayan War.

During the Siege of Uruguaiana, he had an intense debate with David Canabarro about the need to attack the enemy as Canabarro wanted to wait for more reinforcements. After the surrender of the Paraguayans in Uruguaiana, he was sent to court, taking on various administrative positions. He commanded the Ministry of War from September 29 to November 10, 1870 during the Cabinet Pimenta Bueno.

In 1854 he was appointed dignitary of the Imperial Order of the Southern Cross and in 1859 of the Imperial Order of the Rose, in 1860 Grand Cross of the Imperial Order of Aviz.
