= Wenceslao Paunero (general) =

Argentine general and politician (1805–1871)

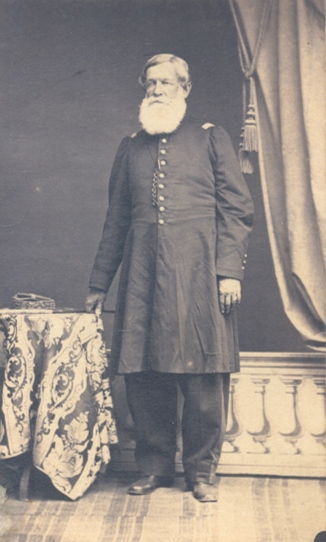

Minister of War and Navy
- In office February 1, 1868 – October 12, 1868
- President: Bartolomé Mitre
- Vice President: Marcos Paz
- Preceded by: Juan Andrés Gelly y Obes
- Succeeded by: Martín de Gainza

Provisional Governor of Córdoba
- In office January 28, 1862 – March 17, 1862
- Preceded by: Marcos Paz
- Succeeded by: Justiniano Posse

Personal details
- Born: 1805 Colonia del Sacramento, Río de la Plata, Spanish Empire
- Died: 1871 (aged 65–66) Rio de Janeiro, Rio de Janeiro, Empire of Brazil
- Spouse: Petrona Manuela de Arrea y Segurola (m. 1843–1871)

Military service
- Allegiance: United Provinces; Argentine Confederation; State of Buenos Aires; Argentina
- Branch: Argentine Army
- Years of service: 1825 – 1871
- Rank: General
- Battles/wars: List: Cisplatine War; Battle of Ituzaingó; Argentine Civil Wars; Battle of San Roque; Battle of La Tablada; Battle of Oncativo; Battle of Caseros; Battle of Cepeda; Battle of Pavón; Battle of Las Playas; Battle of San Ignacio; Paraguayan War; Corrientes campaign; Battle of Corrientes; Siege of Uruguaiana; Battle of Yatay; Humaitá campaign; Battle of Paso de Patria; Battle of Estero Bellaco; Battle of Tuyutí; Battle of Yataytí Corá; Battle of Curuzú

Wenceslao Paunero was a 19th-century Argentine General, politician and diplomat of Uruguayan origin. He was born within the Banda Oriental and would go on to be a major member of the Unitarian Party. He was also the Minister of War and Navy of Argentina and the provisional Governor of Córdoba.

== Early years ==
He was born in Colonia del Sacramento in modern-day Uruguay, then part of the Viceroyalty of the Río de la Plata, on September 28, 1805, as the son of Juan Paunero Caballero, who settled there at the end of the 18th century, and Manuela Delgado Martínez, both of Spanish origin.

For a short time, he attended the Royal College of San Carlos in Buenos Aires, but the lack of materials meant that his family had no fortune which forced him to dedicate himself to earning a living, postponing his studies.

He joined the Argentine Army in 1825, and the government put him in command of the contingent of the Corrientes Province for the Cisplatine War. Under the command of José María Paz he participated in the Battle of Ituzaingó. Returning from the northern front, he was assigned to the troops besieging Colonia, which had not yet been evacuated by the Brazilians, and was taken prisoner by the besieged. He was sent to a prison in Rio de Janeiro but he was exchanged for an imperial officer.

He returned in January 1829 to Buenos Aires, where he was appointed captain by Unitary General Juan Lavalle, who had just usurped the government of the province after assassinating the Buenos Aires Federalist governor Manuel Dorrego. He joined the forces with which Paz invaded Córdoba Province, and took part in the battles of San Roque, La Tablada and Oncativo, in which the federalist leaders Juan Bautista Bustos and Juan Facundo Quiroga were defeated. Between these last two battles, he was promoted to major and sent by Paz to start talks with Quiroga. He fought against the Federalists of Santiago del Estero under the command of Román Deheza and crossed the border with the Native Americans. Paunero took Paz prisoner and defeated his army at the Battle of La Ciudadela under the orders of General Gregorio Aráoz de Lamadrid, he had to flee to Bolivia.

In 1843, he married Petrona Manuela de Arrea y Segurola, daughter of the second marriage of Isidora de Segurola y Rojas, and granddaughter of Brigadier General Sebastián de Segurola as well as a half-sister of President José Ballivián and she diplomatically represented the territory of her birth in Bolivia. He founded the newspaper La Época in La Paz and directed it until he transferred it to Chile. During his exile he met and forged a close friendship with the Buenos Aires Unitarian Bartolomé Mitre who was also exiled. When Ballivián was deposed, he moved to Peru and then to Chile where he made contact with Domingo Faustino Sarmiento and with Juan Bautista Alberdi, among others. He wanted to depose Urquiza so he embarked for Buenos Aires, with Sarmiento and Mitre.

At the end of 1851 he enlisted as a colonel in the Colorado troops campaigning against federal governor Juan Manuel de Rosas and fought in the Battle of Caseros. He was later appointed General Commander of Arms and Chief of Staff of the Army of the State of Buenos Aires. He served on the frontier against the Natives and made an unsuccessful expedition to Salinas Grandes and he was also a commander in San Nicolás de los Arroyos.

== After Pavón ==
He fought in the Battle of Cepeda and was incorporated into the Argentine Confederate Army. Urquiza named him comptroller together with Juan Saá in the San Juan Province, but he had serious disagreements with Saá, who, considering that he defended the revolutionary government, sent him back to Buenos Aires. Shortly thereafter, Saá invaded San Juan, and his bloody victory led to war again. At the head of the infantry, he had a notable performance in the Battle of Pavón in 1861 which was why General Bartolomé Mitre promoted him to colonel major, which was equivalent to a one-star general, on the same battle.

He was sent to Córdoba at the head of an expedition that was to ensure the change of the federal governments of all the provinces. After a few weeks of anarchy in that province, Paunero entered it and appointed Marcos Paz as governor. Paz resigned in January and Paunero occupied the position of provisional governor. He ordered elections to be held in which, despite his claims to be elected incumbent governor, Justiniano Posse was elected.

From Córdoba he sent a division under the command of Sarmiento, who changed the governments of San Luis and Mendoza and had himself elected governor of San Juan. In these actions against the populations of the interior he had as one of his main lieutenants the bloodthirsty Ambrosio Sandes. After a campaign of several months against the caudillo Ángel Vicente "El Chacho" Peñaloza, he signed a peace treaty, with pardon and amnesty for the defeated parties. But the peace offer wasn't respected and Peñaloza took up arms again. El Chacho came to occupy Córdoba, but Paunero defeated him at the Battle of Las Playas on the outskirts of the city. A few months later, Colonel Pablo Irrazábal assassinated him, when Peñaloza had already surrendered and was unarmed.

He remained a few more years in Córdoba, during which he actively participated in successive political conflicts and managed the installation or reinforcement of forts on the borders that existed at that time with the indigenous people.

== Paraguayan War ==
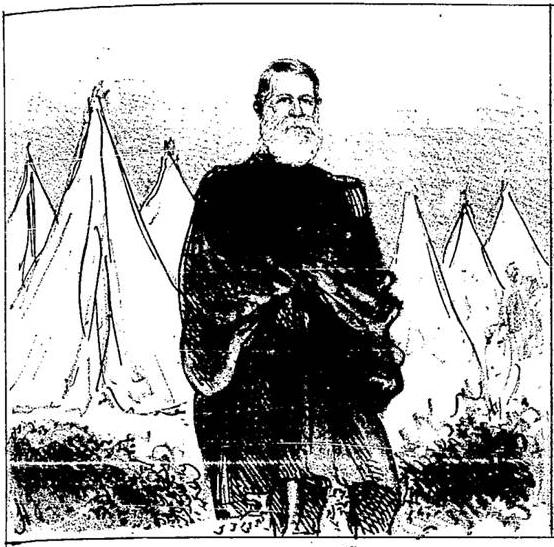
Paunero at a military camp during the Paraguayan War.

In 1865 he joined the army that participated in the Paraguayan War. His first action was to attack the Paraguayans in the Battle of Corrientes, a city they had occupied. He managed to occupy the city, but had to evacuate it due to the enormous numerical superiority of the enemy. For that action he was decorated by the national government.

He moved his troops to the southeast of the province, in a heroic march, and under the command of Venancio Flores he fought in the battle of Yatay and participated in the Siege of Uruguaiana. On the Humaitá campaign, he fought at the battles of Paso de Patria, Estero Bellaco, Tuyutí, Yataytí Corá and Curuzú.

In 1867 he was again sent to war against the Federalist Montoneras, but the rapidity of General Juan Saá 's movements forced him to withdraw. The head of his vanguard, José Miguel Arredondo, attacked and defeated Saá at the Battle of San Ignacio, thus ending the civil war in Cuyo. In July 1867 he was promoted to brigadier general.

At the end of the Mitre government, he was appointed the Minister of War and Navy, and on the presidential elections of 1868 he was a vice-presidential candidate in the official formula headed by Rufino de Elizalde. They were defeated by Sarmiento, who appointed him-among other reasons of state to alleviate his dire financial situation-Minister Plenipotentiary to the Empire of Brazil but died at Rio de Janeiro on June 7, 1871, at the age of 65. During his role as minister plenipotentiary, he was assisted by Leandro N. Alem, who served, for a short time, as secretary of the Argentine Legation. Years later he would write a brief biography of Paunero, whom he had met during the Paraguayan War.

His remains were taken to Buenos Aires in 1891 and rest in the Recoleta Cemetery.
