= João Manuel Mena Barreto =

Brazilian brigadier (1824–1869

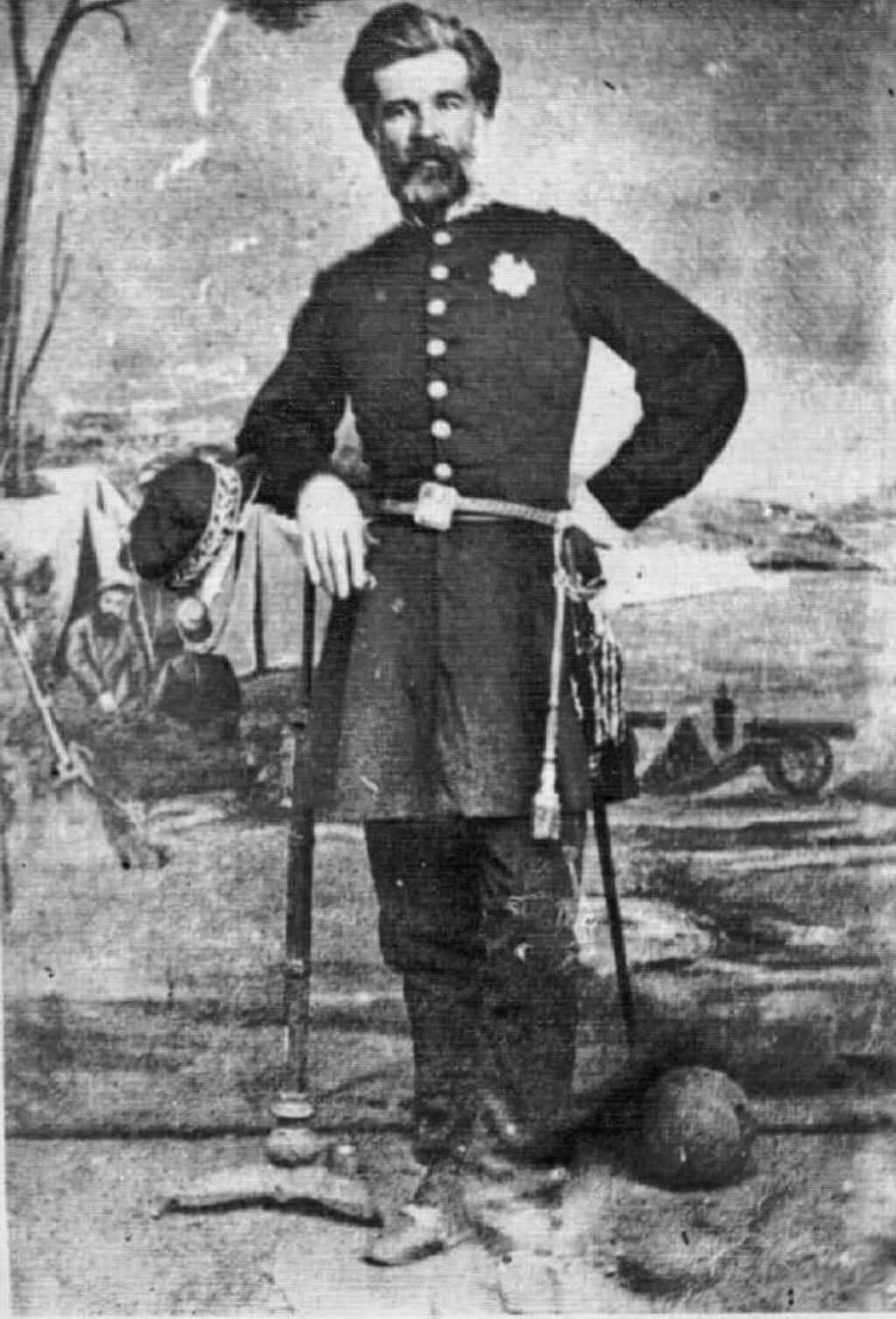
- Born: 24 January 1824; Porto Alegre, Rio Grande do Sul, Brazil
- Died: 12 August 1869 (aged 45); Piribebuy, Cordillera, Paraguay
- Spouse: Maria Balbina Palmeiro da Fontoura (m. 1849)
- Military career
- Allegiance: Empire of Brazil
- Branch: Imperial Brazilian Army
- Service years: 1824–1869
- Rank: Brigadier
- Conflicts: Uruguayan War; Siege of Paysandú; Paraguayan War; Corrientes campaign; Battle of São Borja; Pikysyry campaign; Battle of Avay; Battle of Lomas Valentinas; Campaign of the Hills; Battle of Ybytimí; Battle of Piribebuy †

João Manuel Mena Barreto (24 January 1824 – 12 August 1869) was a Brazilian Brigadier throughout the Uruguayan War and Paraguayan War. He was known for his service at the Battle of São Borja, rescuing the civilian populace from the Paraguayan forces before getting killed in action at the Battle of Piribebuy.

== Biography ==
He was the legitimate son of João de Deus Mena Barreto, Viscount of São Gabriel and Maria Joaquina de Almeida. He married Maria Balbina Palmeiro da Fontoura, on 27 August 1849.

He participated in the Uruguayan War, being promoted to colonel, by merit, on 18 February 1865 after the Siege of Paysandú.

He was then to Paraguay in the first half of 1865 as the commander of the 1st Battalion of Volunteers for the Homeland, as he was informed of the invasion of Rio Grande do Sul near São Borja. The Paraguayans' decision to only take São Borja after crossing the river with only five thousand men and was caused by the impression that the soldiers were a vanguard of the Imperial Brazilian Army. Colonel João Manuel took advantage of this to effect, at night, the strategic withdrawal of all the families from São Borja and was praised for this.

He later took part in the Siege of Uruguaiana, shortly after taking command of a brigade stationed at São Gabriel.

He was later called to court, where he commanded the 1st Guard Regiment. He did not stay long as he wished to return to combat and was promoted to Brigadier in 1867. In November and December of the same year he excelled in combat, later fighting in battles of Avay and Lomas Valentinas.

He was then transferred to command of the 1st Cavalry Division, but was wounded by a bullet in the Battle of Piribebuy, dying on 12 August 1869. His death infuriated the Brazilian commander Count of Eu, who ordered the beheading of Colonel Pablo Caballero and the political chief of the village, Patrício Marecos.

== Awards ==
- Medal of the Oriental State Campaign (1851 - 1852)
- Order of Christ, knight (1858)
- Order of São Bento de Aviz, knight (1860)
- Order of the Cruzeiro, knight (1860)
- Order of the Cruzeiro, officer (1865)
- Order of the Rose (1869)

=== Foreign Awards ===
- Portugal: Medalha de Mérito Militar
