= Pedro Duarte (general) =

Paraguayan general and politician (1829–1902)

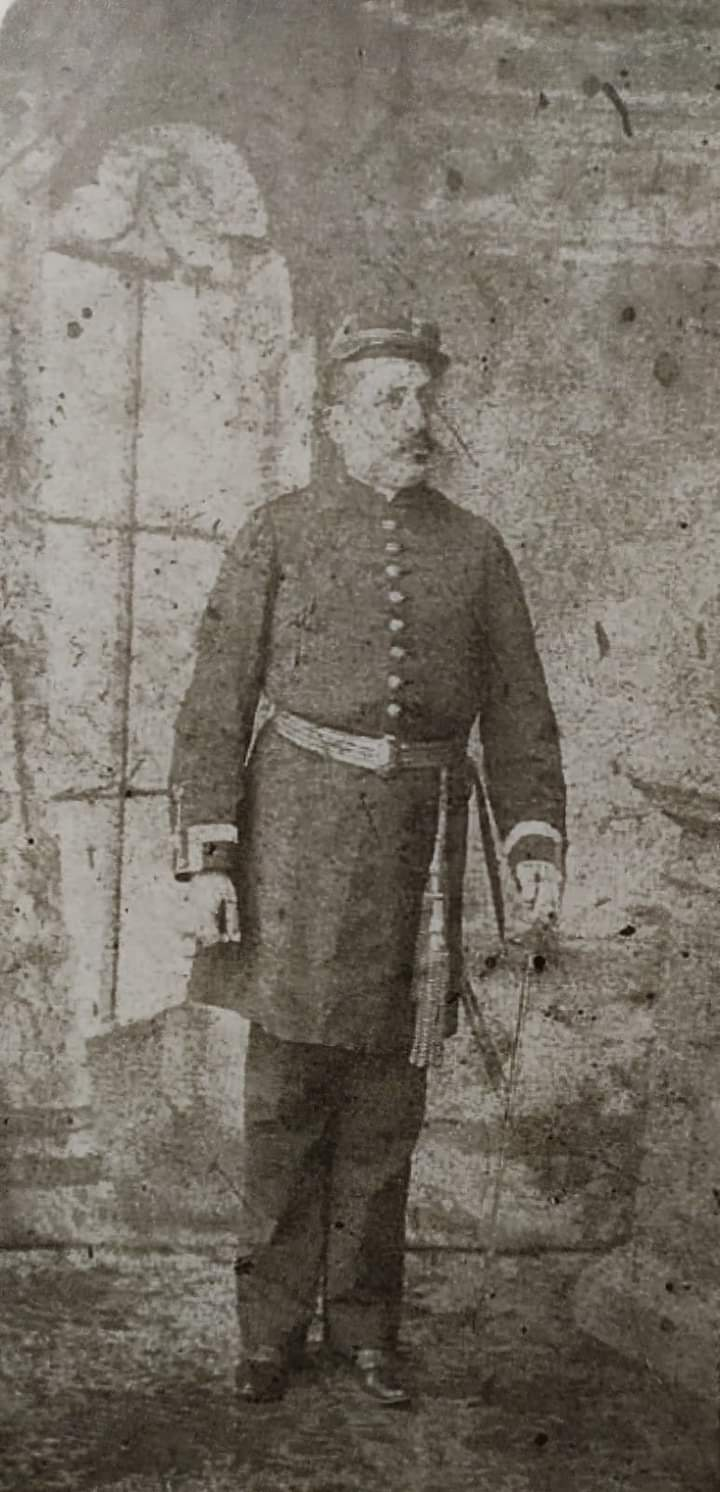
- Born: 29 June 1829; San Juan Bautista de Ñeembucú, Ñeembucú, Paraguay
- Died: 19 June 1902 (aged 72); Asunción, Paraguay
- Military career
- Allegiance: Paraguay
- Branch: Paraguayan Army
- Service years: 1844–1890
- Rank: General de división
- Conflicts: Paraguayan War; Corrientes campaign; Invasion of Rio Grande do Sul; Battle of São Borja; Battle of Yatay (POW)

Pedro Duarte (29 June 1829 – 19 June 1902) was a Paraguayan general and politician of the Paraguayan War. He was known for his service during the Corrientes campaign and was one of the few Paraguayan military leaders to survive the conflict.

== Early career ==
He spent his first years of life in the town of San Juan Bautista de Ñeembucú. In 1844, at the age of 15, he began his military training, entering the garrison located in Pilar. Since then, he has gained military experience and was promoted to the rank of Master Sergeant. In 1859, he was one of the assistants of Francisco Solano López in a diplomatic mission where they acted as mediators in the Argentine Civil Wars between the State of Buenos Aires and the Argentine Confederation where the Pact of San José de Flores was signed.

== War of the Triple Alliance ==
In November 1864, the War of the Triple Alliance broke out, for which Duarte was summoned and assigned a group of men to be trained by him. On 27 April 1865, a large column of the Paraguayan Army made up of about 10,000 men began their march towards Rio Grande do Sul, passing through the modern-day Argentine provinces of Misiones and Corrientes. The campaign was led by Antonio de la Cruz Estigarribia, with Duarte being his second in command.

On 5 May 1865, the Paraguayan forces arrived in Santo Tomé, where they divided into two groups, the first group made up of about 6,800 men under the command of Estigarribia crossed the Uruguay River and advanced through Brazilian territory until reaching Uruguaiana. Duarte remained in command of the second group that was made up of about 3,200 men who advanced through Argentine territory until they reached the banks of the Yatay stream near Paso de los libres. On 11 August 1865, Duarte learned that some 12,000 allies were approaching his position and outnumbered them, so he requested reinforcements from Estigarribia, but he refused to send them because he doubted the veracity of the information that the allied army had mobilized so many soldiers so quickly.

On 17 August 1865, the Battle of Yatay was fought where the 3,200 men under the command of Duarte faced the allied army made up of about 12,000 men under the command of General Venancio Flores. In this battle, the Paraguayans repulsed the initial attacks but due to numerical inferiority, they couldn't hold their positions for long. When the battle was already lost, Duarte ordered a desperate cavalry charge to buy some time and for some of his men to escape. During the charge, his horse died and he fell to the ground, after which he continued fighting until he was surrounded. He subsequently received two bayonet wounds and was offered the chance to surrender under the promise that his life would be spared.

Following this, Duarte finally surrendered and was taken prisoner along with 1,300 of his men. He spent the rest of the conflict as a prisoner of war in Buenos Aires.

== Post-war career ==
A few years after the end of the war, he returned to Paraguay and served in different public positions, as political chief of the capital, Asunción, and as Minister of War and Navy in 1879, reaching the rank of Divisional General of the Paraguayan Army in 1890. He spent his last years in the city of Asunción where he died on 19 July 1902, at the age of 72.

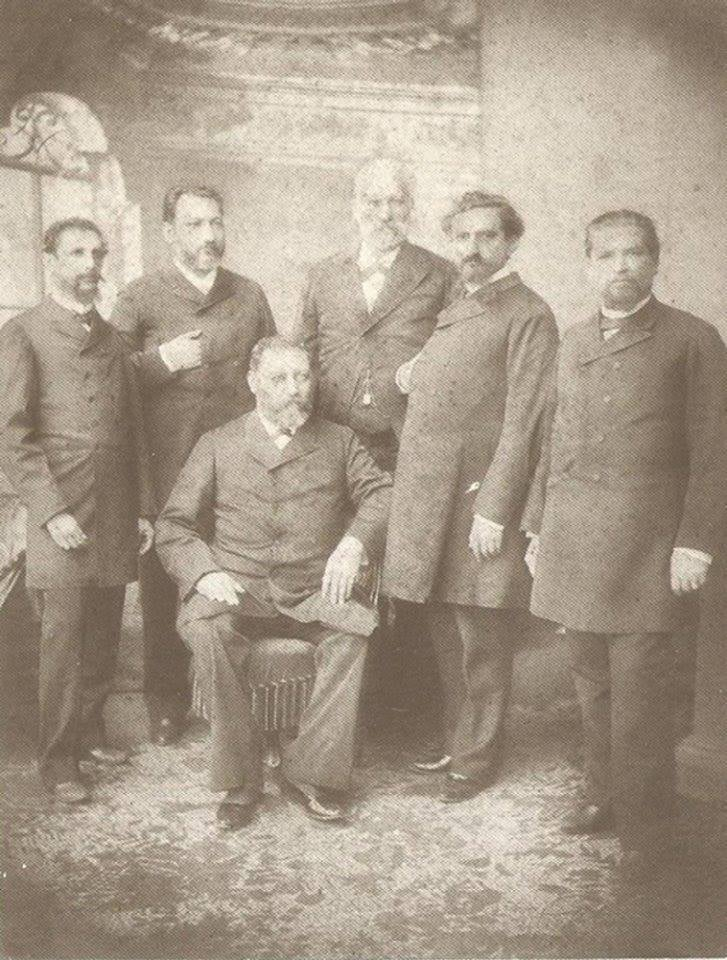
Bernardino Caballero's cabinet in 1886; Duarte is standing in the middle

== Legacy ==
The "Escuela Nacional General Pedro Duarte N°2525" at the District of Carlos Antonio López, Itapúa is named after him. The 8th Cavalry Regiment "Pedro Duarte" is also named in his honor.

== Dates of rank ==
Insignia	Rank	Date	Component
	Recruit	1844	Paraguayan Army
	Corporal	1851	Paraguayan Army
	Sergeant	1855	Paraguayan Army
No insignia	Ensign	1857	Aide-de-Camp of Solano López
	Lieutenant	1859	Paraguayan Army
	Captain	1862	Paraguayan Army
	Sergeant Major	1864	Paraguayan Army
	Divisional General	1879	Paraguayan Army
