= Pedro Duarte (footballer, born 1972) =

Portuguese footballer

Personal information
- Full name: Pedro Nuno Vieira Duarte
- Date of birth: 19 February 1972 (age 54)
- Place of birth: Marinha Grande, Portugal
- Height: 1.89 m (6 ft 2 in)
- Position: Goalkeeper

Youth career
- Marinhense
- –1990: SL Marinha

Senior career*
Years	Team	Apps	(Gls)
1999–1992	SL Marinha		
1992–1996	Marinhense		
1996–1997	Guarda	8	(0)
1997–1998	Pombal		
1998–2000	Estrela Amadora	0	(0)
2000–2004	Pombal	123	(0)
2004–2008	Fátima	107	(0)
2008–2009	Serra	18	(0)
2009–2014	Marinhense	95	(0)
2014–2015	Leiria e Marrazes	25	(0)
2016	Vieirense		
2017	Marinhense	0	(0)
2017–2018	Os Vidreiros	5	(0)
- * Club domestic league appearances and goals

Pedro Nuno Vieira Duarte (born 19 February 1972), shortened to Pedro Duarte is a retired Portuguese football goalkeeper. He played on the Portuguese second tier for Fátima. Earlier, he spent two seasons in Estrela Amadora and played one cup match.
