= Siege of Uruguaiana =

Starvation campaign in the Paraguayan War

- Part of the Corrientes campaign
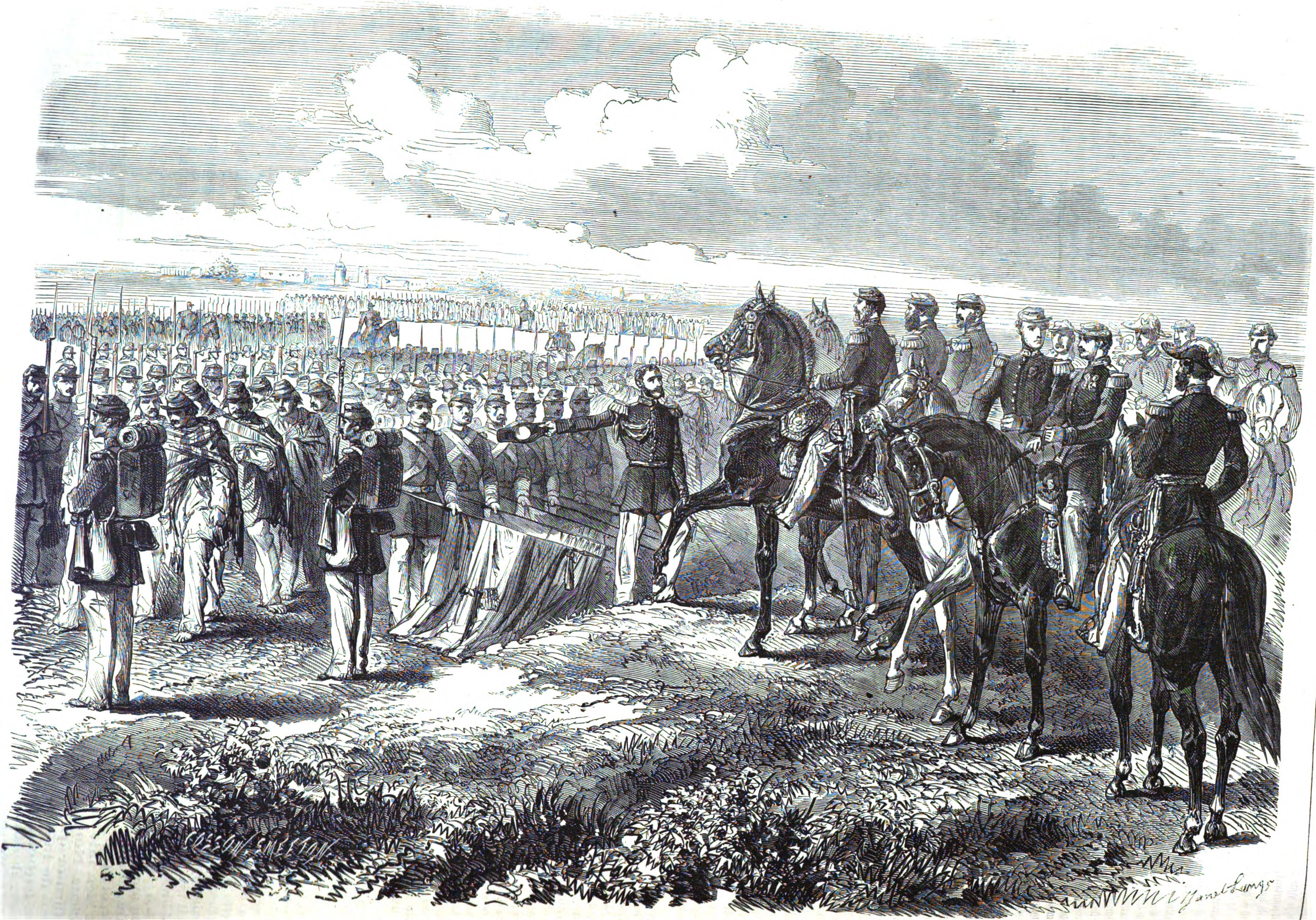
- Paraguayan surrender at Uruguaiana (L'Illustration: journal universel, Vol. XLVII, nº 1.197, 1866)
| Date | August – 18 September 1865 |
| Location | Uruguaiana, Brazil 29°45′18″S 57°05′16″W |
| Result | Allied victory, Paraguayan surrender on 18 September |

Belligerents
| Paraguay | Empire of Brazil; Argentina; Uruguay |

Commanders and leaders
| A. Estigarribia (surrendered) | Pedro II; Marques de Sousa; Count of Eu; Bartolomé Mitre; Venancio Flores |

Strength
| 8,000 men; 8 guns | 17,346 men; 54 guns; 6 steamers (Imperial Brazilian Navy) |

Casualties and losses
| 5,545 surrendered, the rest of the force had died from starvation and disease | 4,796 killed; 3,415 wounded; 11 guns destroyed; 1 steamer sunk |

The siege of Uruguaiana was an engagement in the Paraguayan War that began in late August 1865, and ended on 18 September that year when the Paraguayans were forced to surrender due to low food supplies. Paraguayan forces surrendered in spite of President López's order to the Paraguayan commander, Colonel Estigarribia, not to do so. After the allied victory at Uruguaiana, Lopéz withdrew his army from Argentina and Brazil.

== Background ==
The Paraguayan Army had captured Uruguaiana at 5 August 1865, without any resistance. Following their defeat in the Battle of Yatay, the Paraguayans occupied Uruguaiana with 8,000 men and fortified it with an abattis. Col. Estigarribia faced the combined allied armies of Brazil, Argentina, and Uruguay. On 16 July, the Brazilian Army reached the border of Rio Grande do Sul and joined with President Mitre's forces to surround Uruguaiana by Sept. The Brazilian Navy held the river with the steamers Taquary, Tramandahy, Onze de Junho, Iniciador, Uruguay, and Unido.

From the very beginning, the Brazilian commanders had an acrimonious relationship with Brazil's allies Bartolomé Mitre, president of Argentina, and Venancio Flores, president of Uruguay, each of whom led the army of their respective nation. The years had not lessened Porto Alegre's prejudice against Hispanic-Americans; on the contrary, his antagonism had increased. On 2 September, Flores suggested an immediate attack on Uruguaiana, an option rejected by Porto Alegre and Joaquim Marques Lisboa (then-Viscount and later Marquis of Tamandaré), the commander-in-chief of the Brazilian Navy. When Flores claimed that he could defeat the Paraguayan army alone, he was mocked by both Brazilian officers. Field Marshal Manuel Luís Osório was at the front of the Brazilian troops. Some of the troops, commanded by Lt. Gen. Manuel Marques de Sousa, Count of Porto Alegre, left to reinforce Uruguaiana.

The allied troops united under Emperor Pedro II of Brazil, the Count d'Eu, and President Mitre in the camp of Concordia, in the Argentine province of Entre Ríos. Since his arrival in Uruguaiana, Mitre had claimed the position of commander-in-chief of all allied forces participating in the siege—a precedence which Porto Alegre vehemently refused to recognize. He reminded the Argentine president that, according to the Treaty of the Triple Alliance, the imperial army would be led by a Brazilian officer while on Brazilian soil. The dispute was temporarily forgotten when Pedro II arrived at the front. The Brazilian monarch settled the dispute when, at his suggestion, the allied army was divided into three forces, one led by Porto Alegre and the other two by Mitre and Flores.

== Siege ==
A call for Uruguaiana to surrender was ignored on 4 Sept. On 11 September, emperor Pedro II arrived at the scene of the siege, where were the presidents of Argentina, Bartolomé Mitre and Uruguay, Venancio Flores, and several military leaders, such as Admiral Tamandaré. The allied forces of the siege counted on 17,346 combatants and 12,393 Brazilians, Argentine 3,802 and 1,220 Uruguayans, and 54 guns. The surrender came on 18 September when Estigarribia's men had exhausted all food except sugar.

== Aftermath ==
President López evacuated Corrientes in order to defend Paraguay's frontier. Gen. Resquín commanded the evacuation, taking over 100,000 head of cattle and other livestock across the Paraguay River at Paso de Patria between 31 Oct and 3 Nov.

== Gallery ==
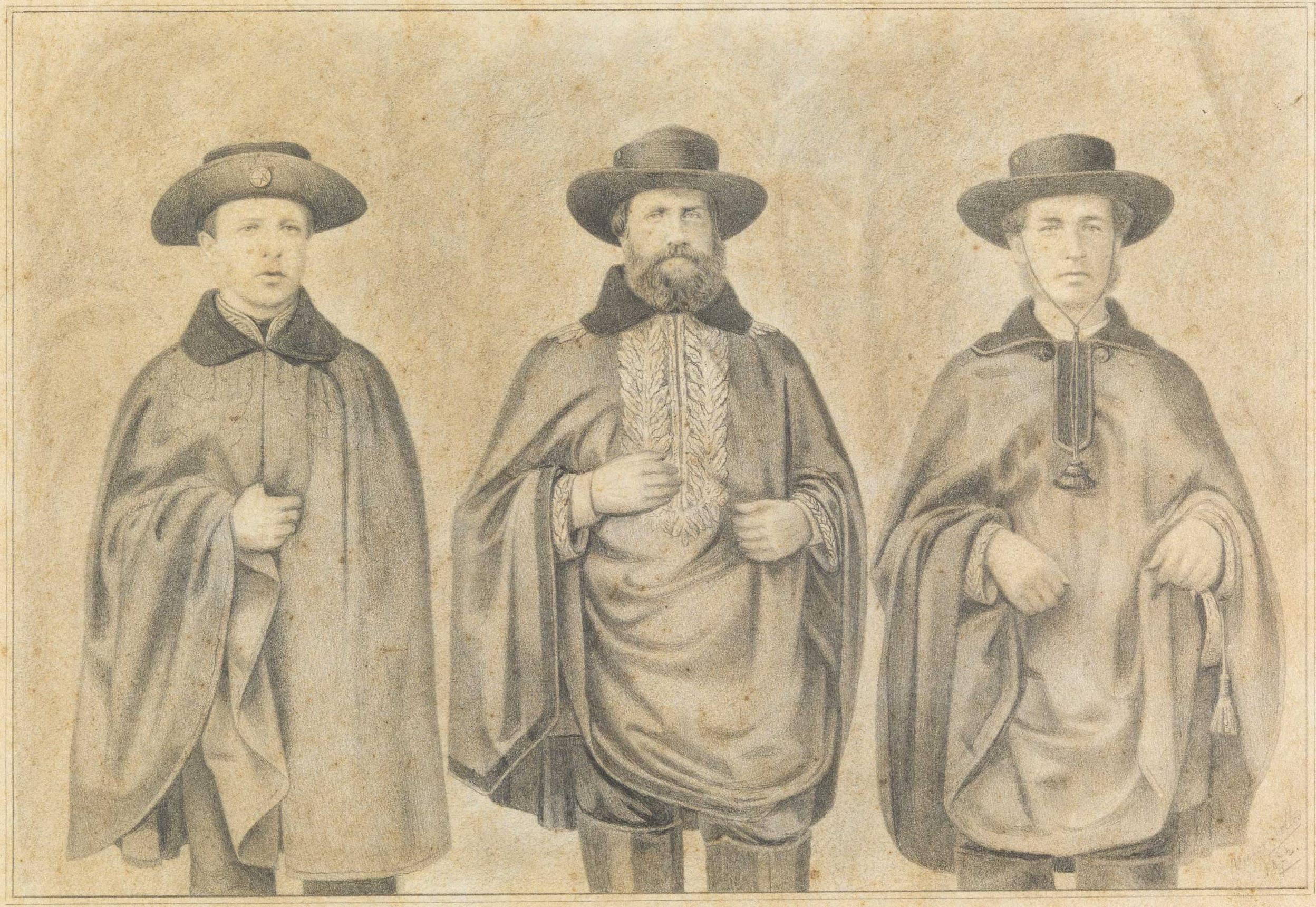
Emperor Pedro II, Count of Eu and Duke of Saxe-Coburg and Gotha, when they were in Uruguaiana, in 1865.

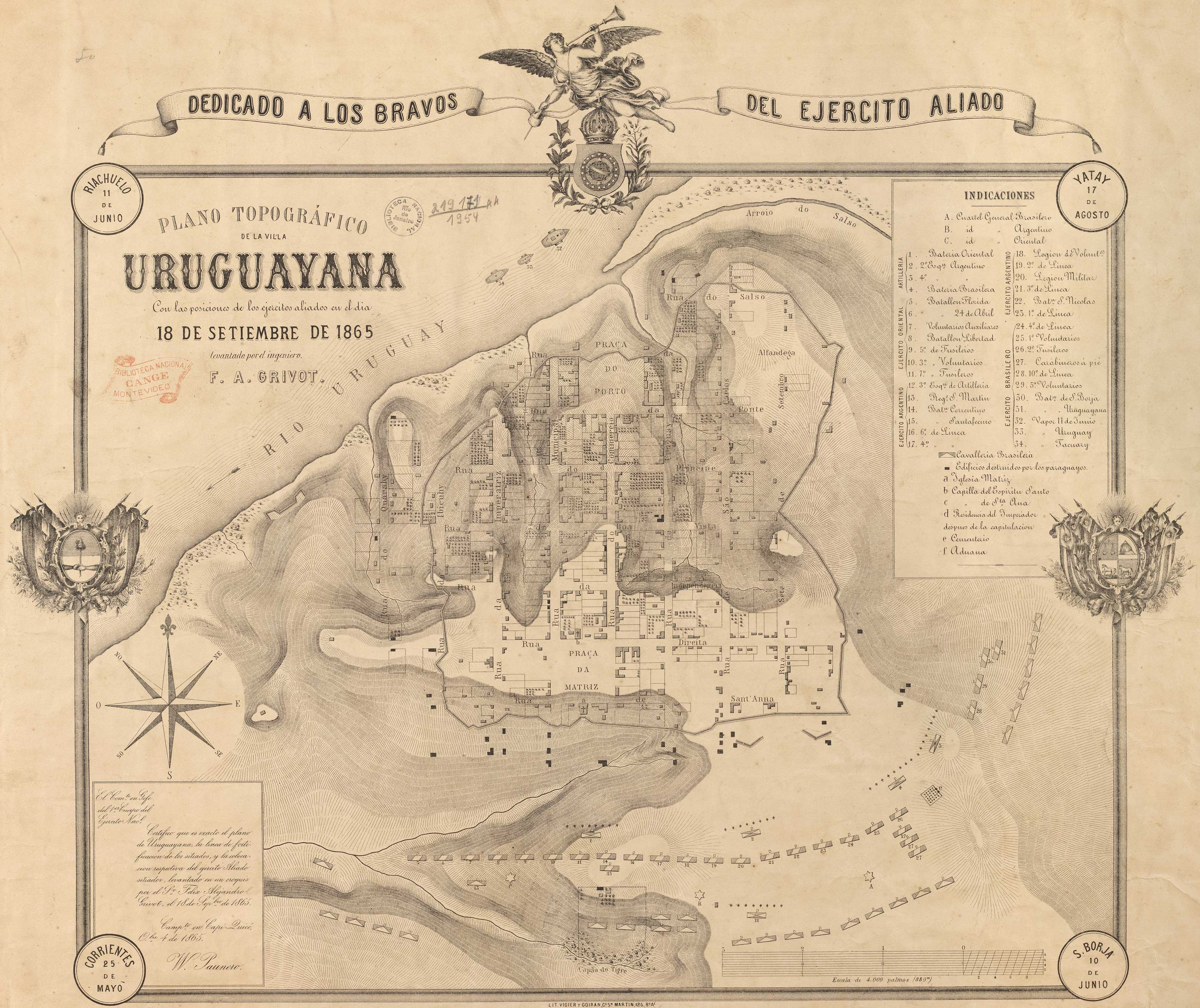
Topographic plan of the village of Uruguaiana with the positions of the Allied armies at September 18, 1865 (F. A. Grivot).

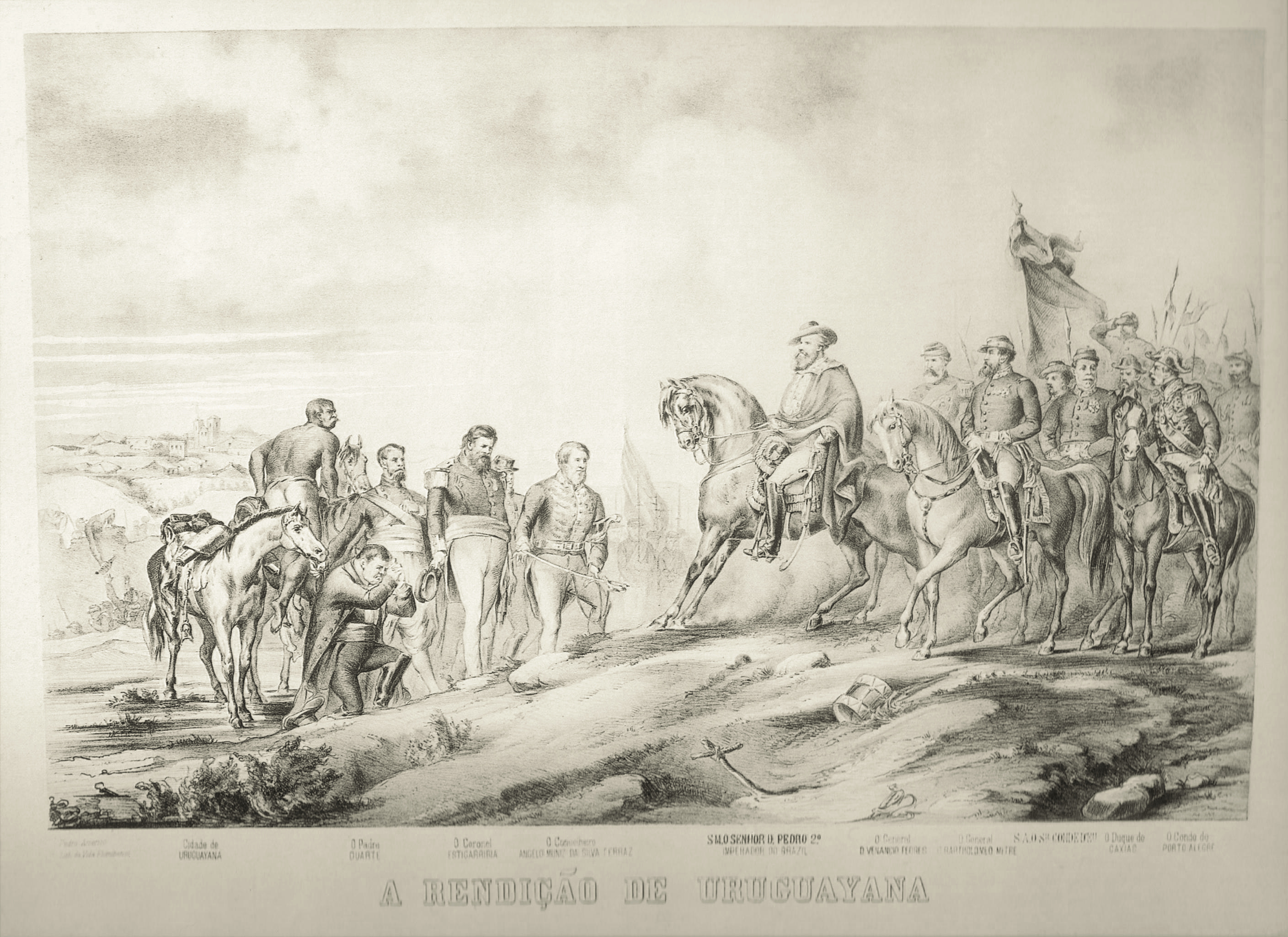
Paraguayan surrender at Uruguaiana.

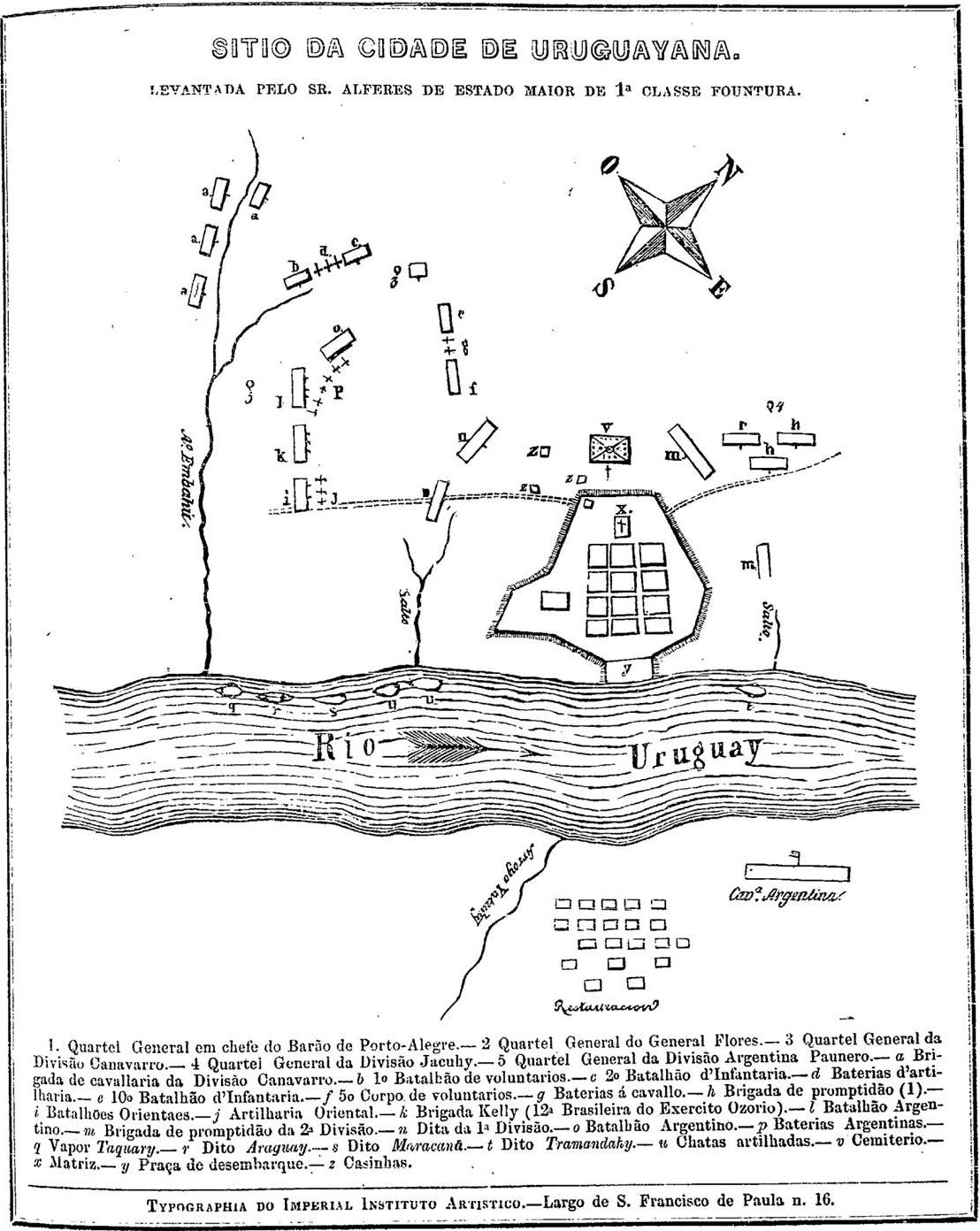
Siege of Uruguaiana
