= Wenceslao Robles =

Paraguayan general (1820–1866)

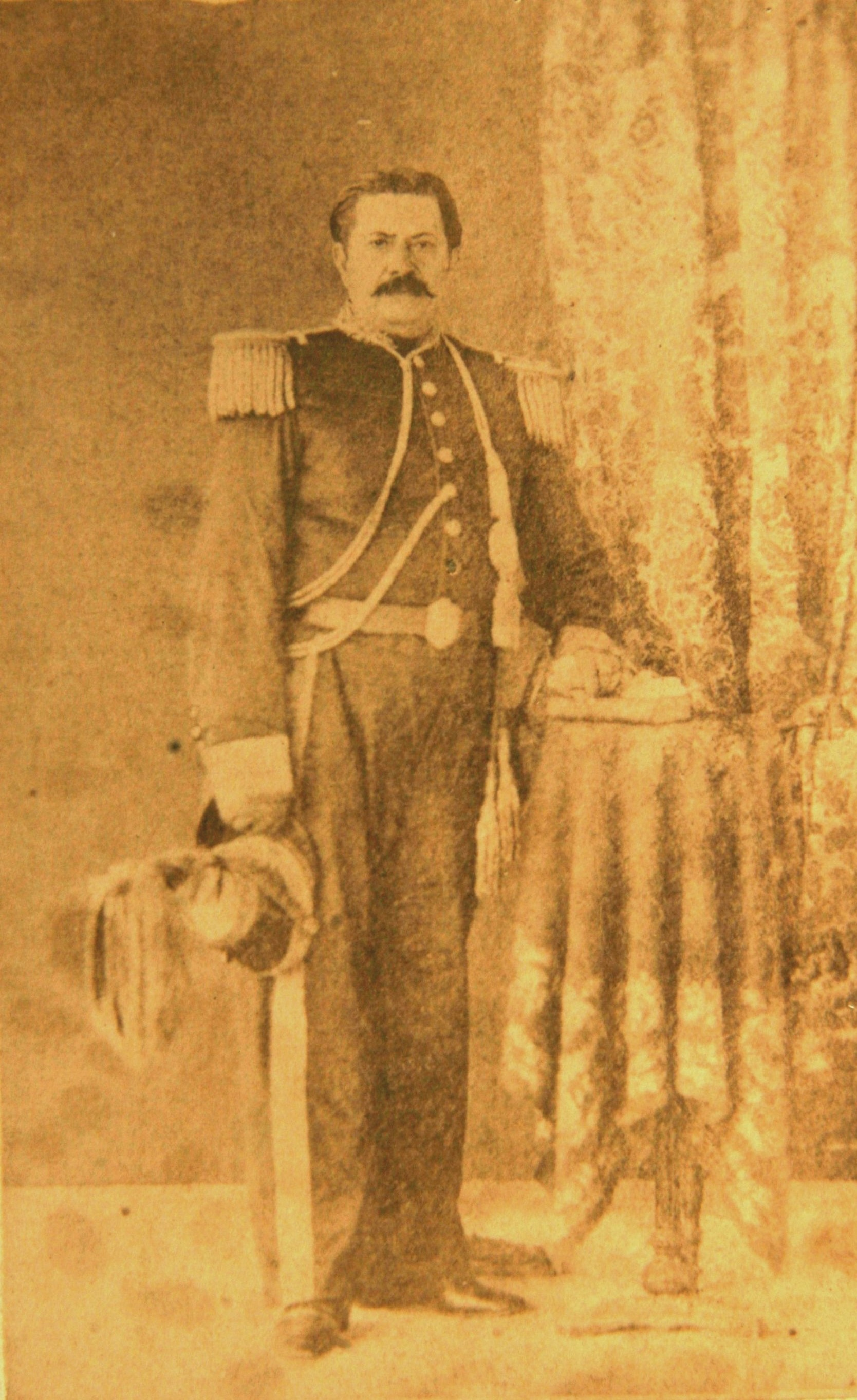
- Born: c. 1820; Santísima Trinidad, Asunción, Paraguay
- Died: 6 January 1866 (aged 45–46); Paso de Patria, Ñeembucú, Paraguay
- Military career
- Allegiance: Paraguay
- Branch: Paraguayan Army
- Service years: 18??–1866
- Rank: Brigadier General
- Conflicts: Paraguayan War; Corrientes campaign; Battle of Corrientes

Wenceslao Robles (c. 1820 – 6 January 1866) was a Paraguayan general of the Paraguayan War who led the Battle of Corrientes and was described as "the oldest and the most forgotten of the generals of the war of 64/70".

== Biography ==
Wenceslao Robles was born at Santísima Trinidad, Paraguay. In 1864, the year in which the Paraguayan War broke out, he held the rank of brigadier general of the Paraguayan army. Only Francisco Solano López held the rank of general, which was why Robles was responsible for organizing and commanding the troops of his nation gathered at Fort Cerro León. When Paraguay attacked Argentina, he was placed in charge of the Fortress of Humaitá and was responsible for transmitting the news of the declaration of war and the corresponding instructions from Foreign Minister José Berges and from Finance Minister Mariano González to Paraguayan officials in the Río de la Plata.

On 14 April 1865, he left Itapirú at the head of an expeditionary force of 3,000 men, occupied the city of Corrientes, and advanced towards the south of that province.

López sent Lieutenant Colonel Paulino Alén to award the National Order of Merit to him, but Robles violently rejected the decoration, protesting loudly about the hardships suffered by his troops, especially their lack of coats.

In response, López promoted Colonel Francisco Isidoro Resquín to the rank of brigadier general and named him second commander of the Southern Division. Next, he sent the Minister of War and Navy, General Vicente Barrios, with the order for his dismissal and arrest. Barrios presented himself at Fort Empedrado, Corrientes and proceeded to carry out his commission.

Robles was transferred to Humaitá and after being judged for failure to comply with orders, he was shot at the Paso de Patria Camp on 6 January 1866.

A witness portrays him thus: "Among the diners are... Wenceslao Robles, the only general in the ranks, apart from Solano López, and one of the few soldiers who did not wear a beard at that time..."
