= Antônio Fernandes Lima =

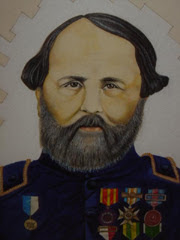
- Born: July 27, 1803; Cachoeira do Sul, Rio Grande do Sul, Brazil, Portugal
- Died: 1875 (aged 71–72); Itaqui, Rio Grande do Sul, Brazil
- Military career
- Allegiance: Empire of Brazil
- Branch: Imperial Brazilian Army
- Service years: 1819–1865
- Rank: Colonel
- Conflicts: Ragamuffin War; Paraguayan War; Corrientes campaign; Battle of São Borja; Battle of Butuí

Antônio Fernandes Lima (1803-1875) was a Brazilian Colonel of the Paraguayan War. He commanded the 1st Brigade during the war as well as being the main Brazilian commander at the Battle of São Borja.

== Early Military Career ==
Antônio was born on July 27, 1803, as the son of Francisco Fernandes Lima and Isabel Francisca do Amor Divino. He was baptized in 1804 at the Oratory of Santa Maria da Boca do Monte. He enlisted in 1819 in the 23rd Line Infantry Regiment before being transferred to the 4th Cavalry Corps of the National Guard. He was promoted to ensign in 1836, Lieutenant in 1837, Captain in 1838, Major in 1842, Lieutenant Colonel in 1844 and to Colonel in 1858. Lima then participated in the Ragamuffin War as part of the 4th Corps along with Lieutenant Colonel Demétrio Ribeiro as part of several transportation in the war.

== Paraguayan War ==
During the Paraguayan War, Lima was given command of the first barracks at Itaqui which was made out of stone and covered with tiles with Lima personally contributing to the construction of the fort. When the Paraguayan Army invaded Itaqui and São Borja which commenced the Battle of São Borja. Despite being warned about the invasion, Lima didn't expect the Paraguayan forces to arrive as quickly as the Press were reporting them to move at and only sent a meager 2,000 to defend the barracks which resulted in the Paraguayans capturing and looting the village. Lima was criticized by the Press for his relative passivity at São Borja with Souza Docca being a major critic of Lima and was relieved of his position.

== Later years ==
On July 30, 1866, Lima requested to continue his permit on his business house at São Borja along with his third wife, Maria Eulalia. He spent his final years in the religious neighborhoods of Nossa Senhora da Conceição and Divino Espírito Santo at Itaqui and donated $500,000 for the construction of a new church before his death in 1875.
