= Battle of São Borja =

1868 battle of the Paraguayan War

- Part of the Corrientes campaign
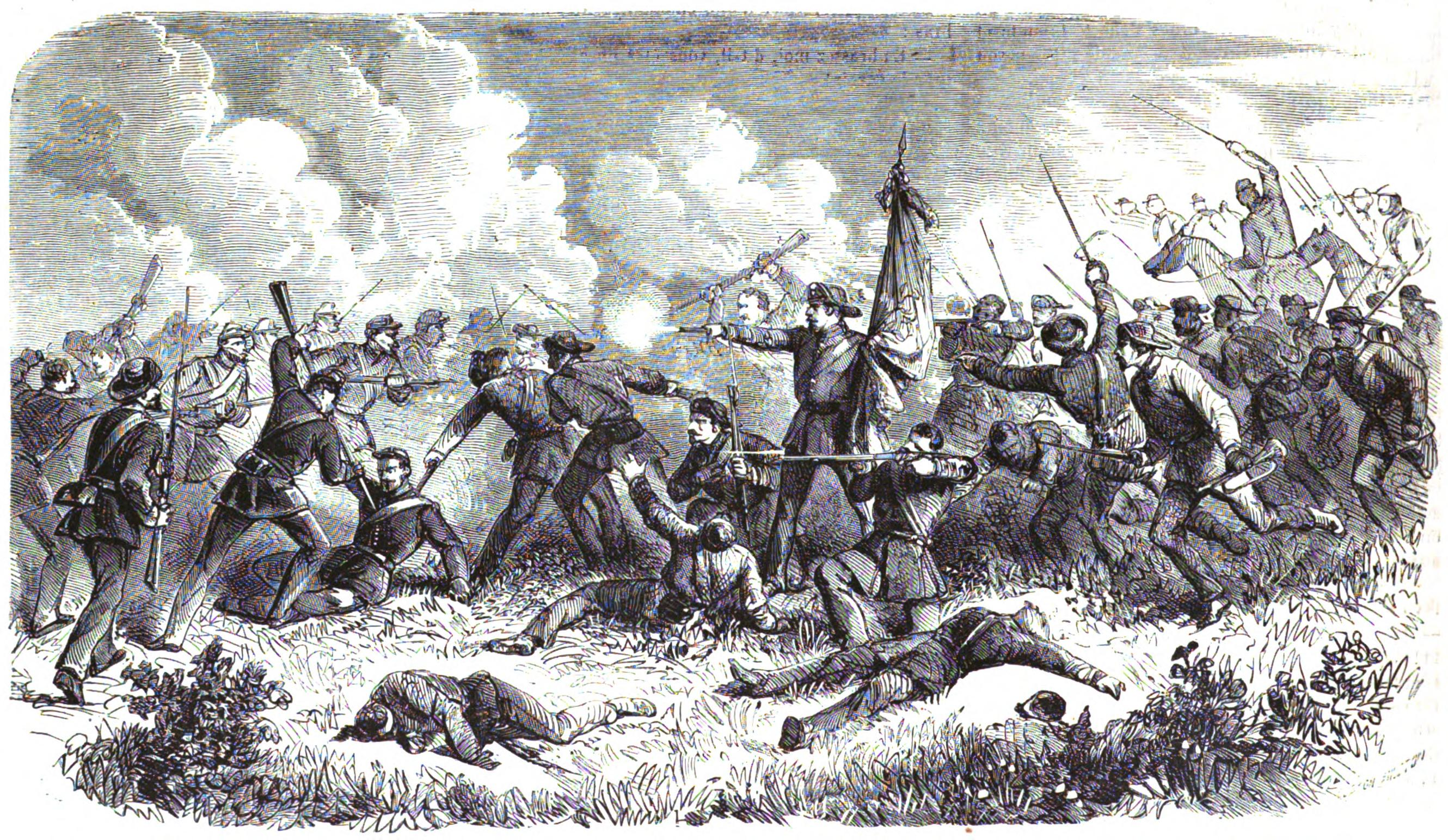
- The 1st Battalion of Fatherland Volunteers defending their flag against the Paraguayans (L'Illustration, 1865)
Date	10 June 1865
Location	São Borja, Rio Grande do Sul, Brazil
Result	Paraguayan victory

Belligerents
Paraguay	Empire of Brazil

Commanders and leaders
Antonio Estigarribia; Pedro Duarte	Antônio F. Lima; João Mena Barreto; Floriano Peixoto

Strength
10,000; 5 guns	2,000

Casualties and losses
200 killed some wounded	85 killed 50 wounded

The Battle of São Borja was fought on 10 June 1865 at the beginning of the Paraguayan invasion of Rio Grande do Sul during the Paraguayan War.

== Battle ==
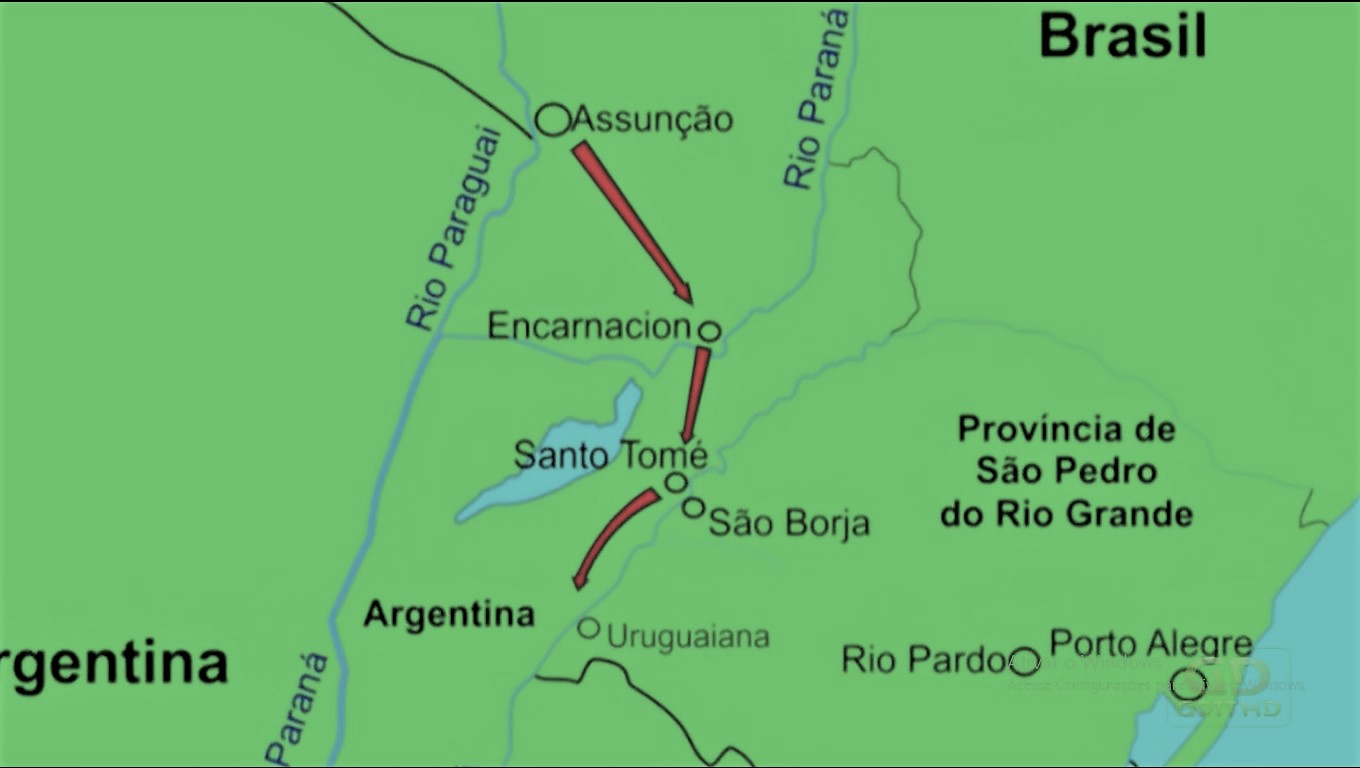
Paraguayan troops' movements

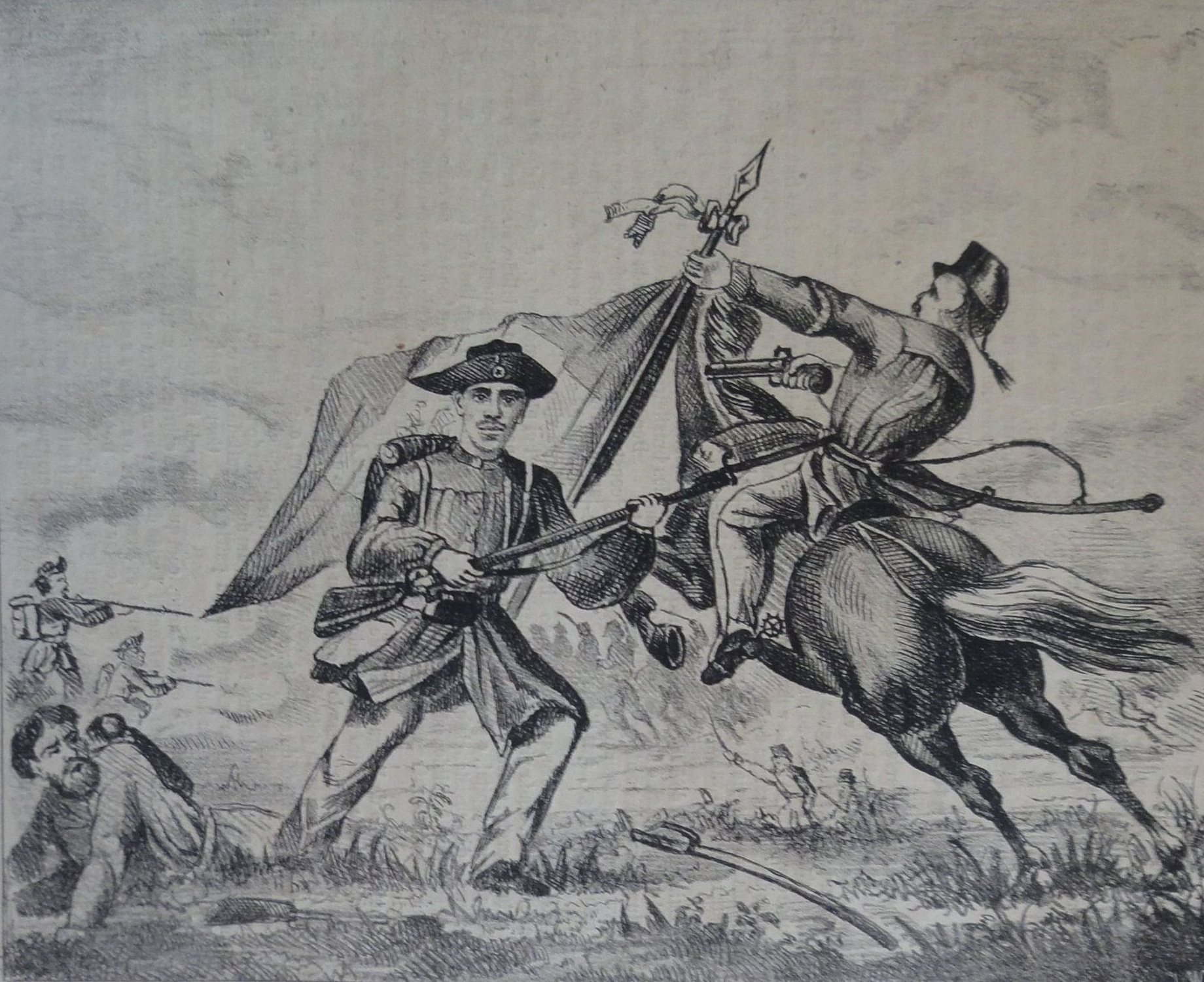
Luiz Antonio de Vargas saving the flag of his battalion in the battle of S. Borja on 10 June 1865, A Sentinela do Sul, No. 8, 1867

Even after the disastrous defeat at the Battle of Riachuelo, the Paraguayan soldiers continued advancing overland towards Rio Grande do Sul, under the command of Lieutenant Colonel Antonio de la Cruz Estigarribia. A few days earlier, on June 8, the Paraguayan column, organized by Major Pedro Duarte and numbering about 10,000 men, was in the Argentine village of Santo Tomé, close to 8 km (5.0 mi) from the border with Brazil. Along with them were 5 cannons, 20 canoes, and 30 carts with various supplies.

From that point onwards, Estigarribia began preparations for the offensive and 6,000 men were at his disposal. On the morning of 10 June 1865, on foot and by canoe, his troops slowly crossed the Uruguay River. Colonel Antônio Fernandes Lima, head of the Brazilian forces in the frontier, was warned about Paraguayan movements on the other side of the river, but did not believe in the speed of their preparations. The Colonel ordered his forces of 2,000 soldiers to march unhurriedly towards the Paraguayans.

At 10 in the morning the Paraguayans began the attack on São Borja, encountering weak resistance from lancers commanded by Colonel Ferreira Guimarães. After about 4 hours of fighting, reinforcements from the 1st Battalion of Fatherland Volunteers arrived at the scene under the command of Lieutenant Colonel João Manuel Mena Barreto, who found the Paraguayans penetrating the city, at the mouth of São João street (then called General Marques street). 1,400 Paraguayans from the column of Captain Diogo Alvarenga were bayoneted by 200 infantrymen commanded by Floriano Peixoto, who would later become President of Brazil.

Even though the number of reinforcements was only 650 soldiers, it was enough to hold position for two days, giving time for the local population to be evacuated safely. Soon after, on June 12, the village was abandoned by the Brazilians, being occupied and looted by the Paraguayans for a week. On the 19th, the Paraguayans, encouraged by the victory, left for Uruguaiana.
