= Battle of Corrientes =

- Part of the Corrientes campaign
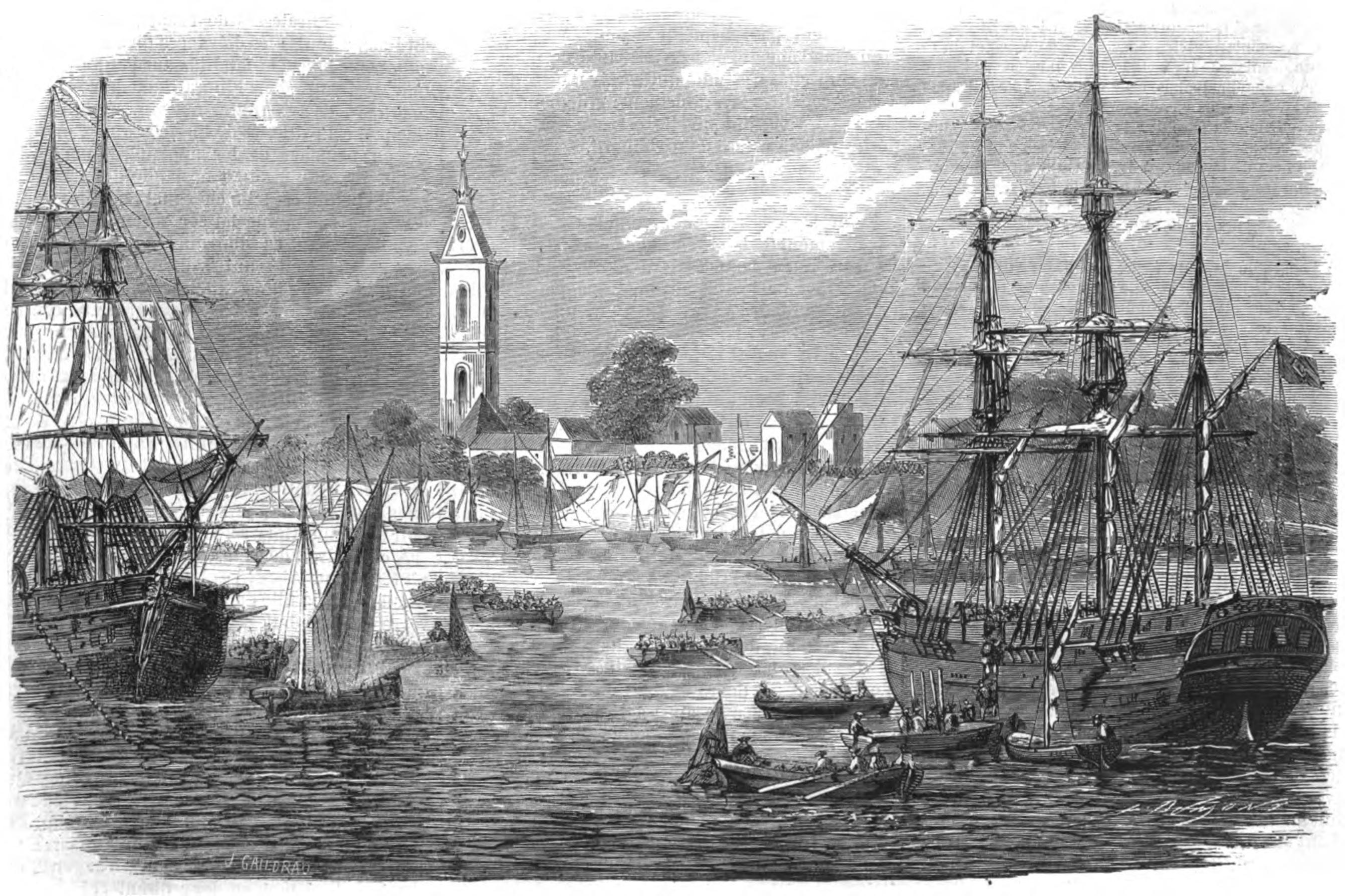
- Arrival of Brazilian reinforcements at Corrientes (Paraná) – L'Illustration, 1866.
Date	1865
Location	Corrientes Province, Argentina
Result	Allied victory

Belligerents
Paraguay	Argentina; Empire of Brazil; Uruguay

Commanders and leaders
Wenceslao Robles	Bartolomé Mitre; Joaquim M. Lisboa

Strength
37,000 soldiers 5 warships	10,000 soldiers 4 frigates; 15,000 soldiers 17 warships; 1 ironclad

The Battle of Corrientes occurred at the beginning of the Paraguayan War during the second stage of the Paraguayan offensive, after the invasion of Mato Grosso at the beginning of 1865.

The invasion of Corrientes, which took place between 1865 and 1866, was the second phase of the Paraguayan War, during which the Paraguayan army occupied the province of Corrientes. In a way, the Paraguayan occupation of Rio Grande do Sul and the subsequent siege of Uruguaiana, in Brazil, can also be included in this phase.

As a result, Argentina and Uruguay entered the war, which previously only referred to Paraguay and Brazil, signing with the latter a secret pact that was called "Triple Alliance". The invasion resulted in absolute failure for the attacking army, and gave rise to the invasion of Paraguayan territory by the armies of the allied countries.

== Paraguayan invasion ==
On April 13, 1865, a Paraguayan fleet of five ships (Tacuarí, Paraguari, Marques de Olinda, Ygurey and Ypora) under the command of Pedro Ignacio Meza went down the Paraná River until reaching the port of Corrientes, where they captured two ships that were under repair, the 25 de Mayo and the Gualeguay. The following day, a contingent of 3,000 men led by General Wenceslao Robles, travelled by river, disembarked at the port and occupied the city without resistance.

The day after the arrival of the party at Corrientes, the people of the town were summoned to elect a provisional government in place of the one of which all the members have fled the night before the entry of the Paraguayans

News of the invasion arrived with considerable impact in Buenos Aires, also thanks to the fact that the Paraguayan declaration of war had been hidden from the Argentine public. President Bartolomé Mitre, in the midst of a violent demonstration against Paraguay, delivered a famous speech in which he said:

"Gentlemen, after the provocation was launched, after the insult perpetrated on our flag by the tyrant of Paraguay, whoever governs you cannot tell you anything other than that the proclamations and demonstrations will be translated into facts, and that in twenty-four hours we will be in the barracks, in fifteen days on the battlefield and in three months in Asunción".

Corrientes Governor Manuel Ignacio Lagraña, who remained loyal to Mitre, had left the city shortly before Robles arrived; for that reason, the Paraguayans set up an assembly on April 19, which appointed the regency a triumvirate formed by Teodoro Gauna, Víctor Silvero and Sinforoso Cáceres.

Since the occupation of Corrientes was in López's plans to not reveal the right flank of the expedition destined to invade Brazil, General Robles accumulated an army of 20,000 men before leaving to the south, leaving a garrison of 1,500 soldiers in the city, then supplemented by another 2,000 who landed with heavy artillery.

== Brazil, Argentina and Uruguay ally ==
In this context, on May 1, 1865, Brazil, Argentina and Uruguay signed the Triple Alliance Treaty in Buenos Aires, which according to Brazilian diplomat Saraiva was already scheduled for a meeting in Puntas del Rosario on June 18, 1864, many months before the Paraguayan attack; three days later, Argentina formally declared war on Paraguay.

While the governor of Corrientes, housed in the city of San Roque, brought together 3,500 unarmed civilians and military, joined later by 1,500 veteran soldiers of the Argentine Army.

== Paraguayan advance and the recapture of Corrientes ==
As Robles marched south, facing the resistance of small Argentinian armed groups that had no chance of arresting him, occupying in sequence Bella Vista, Empedrado, Santa Lucia and Goya, 250 kilometers to the east, a second column of 12,000 men, commanded by Lt. Col. Antonio de la Cruz Estigarribia, crossed the Paraná River near Encarnación to go south along the right bank of the Uruguay River. On May 5, a group of 2,500 soldiers under the command of Major Pedro Duarte separated from the column and occupied the city of Santo Tomé.

On May 25, an Argentine squad composed of 725 soldiers, commanded by General Wenceslao Paunero, unexpectedly attacked Corrientes; after a tough house-to-house battle, the defeated Paraguayans withdrew from the city to neighboring Empedrado, leaving more than 400 dead behind. Instead of taking advantage of the strategic advantages that the reconquest could offer, for fear of an enemy counterattack, Paunero, who had not received the planned reinforcements from General Cáceres, decided to leave the city so quickly that some soldiers were drowned in the repacking operations.
