= Battle of Butuí =

1865 battle of the Paraguayan War

- Part of the Corrientes campaign
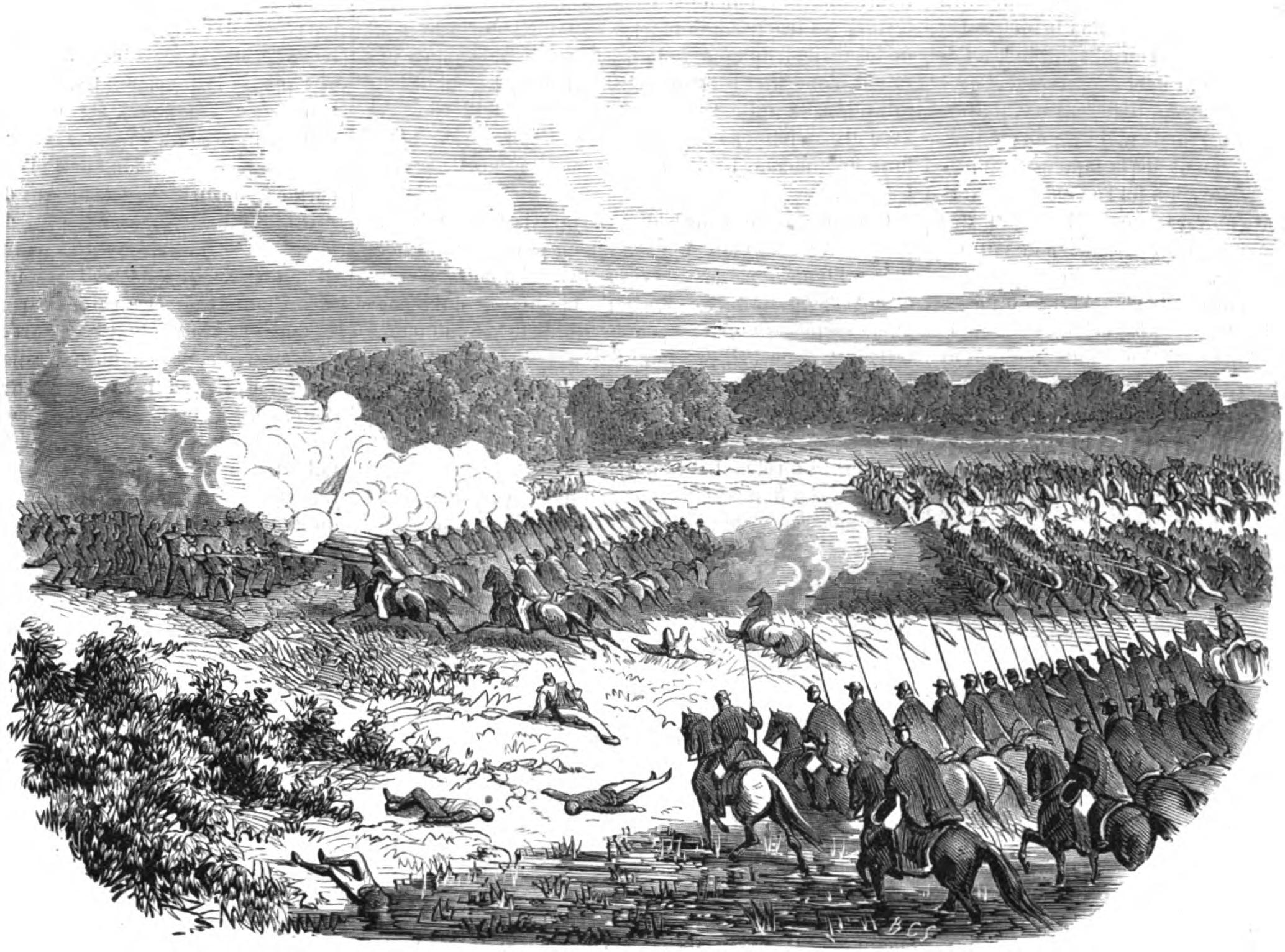
- Combat of Butuí, fought on June 26, 1865 between a Paraguayan division and two Brazilian brigades
Date	26 June 1865
Location	Itaqui, Brazil
Result	Brazilian victory

Belligerents
Empire of Brazil	Paraguay

Commanders and leaders
Antônio F. Lima	José López

Strength
2,000 soldiers	500 soldiers

Casualties and losses
115 killed	236 killed

The Battle of Butuí took place on 26 June 1865 in the Butuí or M'Butuí stream between the municipalities of São Borja and Itaqui in Rio Grande do Sul during the Paraguayan War.

== The battle ==
The advance of Lieutenant Colonel Estigarribia's troops was constantly hampered by the incursions of Brazilian detachments on their way to Uruguaiana, especially São Borja and Itaqui. On 26 June, a Paraguayan column of 500 men under the command of Major José López and 2,000 soldiers of the Brazilian National Guard, under the command of Colonel Fernandes Lima initially engaged in skirmishes. The battle resulted in 236 Paraguayan casualties and 115 on the Brazilian side. With a numerical superiority of 4 to 1, the Brazilians defeated the Paraguayans and they retreated to the main division of Lieutenant Colonel Estigarribia.
