= Venancio Flores =

Uruguayan general and politician (1808–1868)

- Flores, c. 1865

President of Uruguay
- In office 20 February 1865 – 15 February 1868
- Preceded by: Tomás Villalba
- Succeeded by: Pedro Varela
- In office 12 March 1854 – 10 September 1855
- Preceded by: 1853 Government Triumvirate
- Succeeded by: Manuel Basilio Bustamante

Personal details
- Born: 18 May 1808 Trinidad, Viceroyalty of the Río de la Plata
- Died: 19 February 1868 (aged 59) Montevideo, Uruguay
- Party: Colorado Party
- Profession: Military officer; politician

Military service
- Allegiance: Uruguay
- Branch/service: Uruguayan Army
- Battles/wars: Uruguayan War; Paraguayan War

Venancio Flores Barrios (18 May 1808 – 19 February 1868) was a Uruguayan political leader and general who served as President of Uruguay from 1854 to 1855 (interim) and from 1865 to 1868.

== Background and early career ==
Venancio Flores was born on May 18, 1808, in the town of Porongos, now the city of Trinidad. He was the son of Felipe Flores, a wealthy rancher and Cecilia Barrios. The family had three children in total: Manuel, Cecilia, and Venancio, the youngest. The family owned a ranch with fifteen slaves and a house in Porongos, half a block from the church

In 1839, at 31 years old, he was made political chief of the department of San José. He fought in the "Guerra Grande" against Manuel Oribe and his Argentine backers. He became a leading figure in the Colorado Party and formed a triumvirate with Fructuoso Rivera and Juan Antonio Lavalleja in 1853.

Over time, Flores lost political influence and was forced into exile in Brazil due to the dominance of the urban elite, the doctores. He and Manuel Oribe formed a coalition against the central elite, but the new Liberal Union opposed them, and subsequent governments consolidated centralized state control, marginalizing caudillos and rural elites.

== First Presidency of Uruguay ==
He served provisionally as President of Uruguay and remained in power until August 1855, when overthrown by the Blanco president Manuel P. Bustamante, which resulted in civil war and Flores taking refuge in Argentina.

Despite being overthrown and taking refuge in Argentina, Flores had already demonstrated decisive military and political leadership. He successfully aligned the Uruguayan elites behind him and initiated key reforms, including the civil code, the first telegraphic service, and the commercial code.

== Civil war role ==
In 1863, he started a coup d'État (Cruzada Libertadora or liberating crusade), against the Blanco president Bernardo Berro, which led to civil war in Uruguay. A catholic, General Flores used the symbol of a red cross on a white flag for his liberating crusade. After a two year-long campaign, by February 1865 he had taken Montevideo, overthrowing his predecessor.

== Second Presidency of Uruguay ==
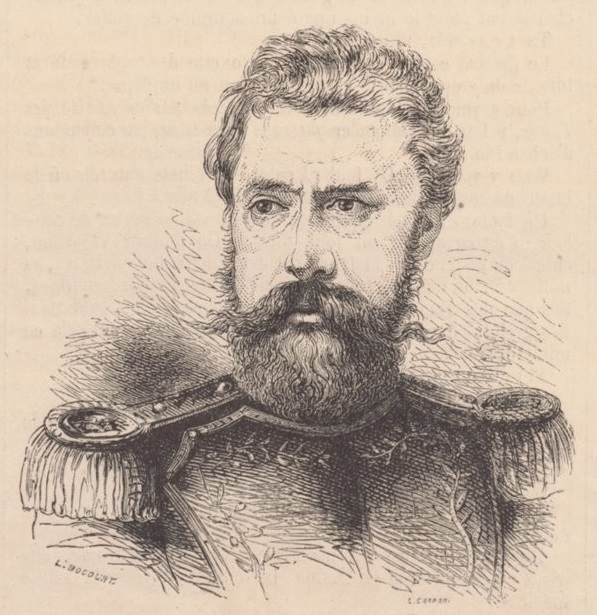
Venancio Flores.

During his rule, Flores joined Brazil with Argentina in their war against Paraguay, which would come to be known as the Paraguayan War and the War of the Triple Alliance.

Flores's government ended on February 15, 1868.

== Assassination ==
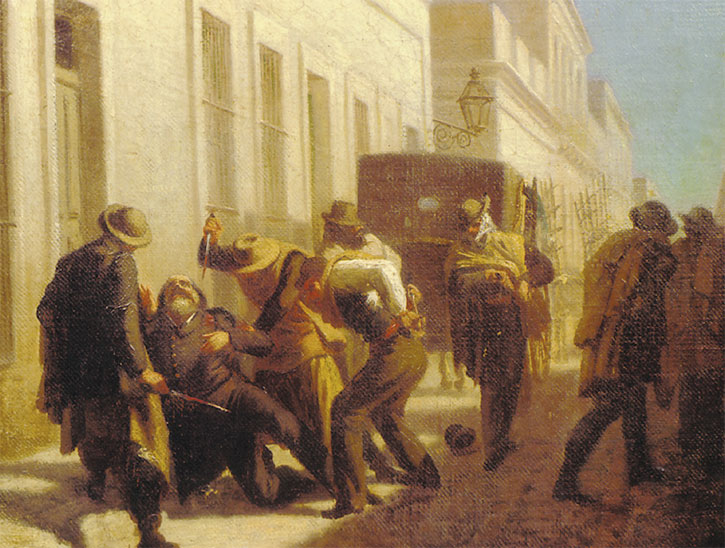
Assassination of Venancio Flores, painting by Juan Manuel Blanes

Four days after stepping down as President, a Blanco party revolt to seize power began. Long in the planning, they attacked the Fort with revolvers and with spears at two in the afternoon. A messenger was immediately sent to the General Flores, asking him to present himself at the Council and to "put some order" into things.

Flores left his home with his guests in a carriage, however, he was stopped by a cart which was barricading the Mercedes street. Here the ambush was sprung, and several men with covered faces started shooting at the carriage. The driver was ordered to head to the police station, but they were blocked in their retreat by two more men that came from behind. A horse was killed and the carriage crashed into the barricade. The men in the carriage were armed with revolvers and started to fight back, but they were surrounded. The driver was shot five times. The passengers who tried to exit the vehicle were immediately shot dead. Now only the General remained, wounded but still breathing, he tried to open the door which was jammed against the cart. The shooting stopped, and the men came to finish him with daggers. They left him there, where the basque priest of Souberbielle found him and gave him the last sacraments.

== Legacy ==
The Flores Department was named in his honor by a later Colorado President of Uruguay, Máximo Santos.

== See also ==
- Máximo Santos#Creation of Flores Department
- History of Uruguay

Political offices
Preceded by Fructuoso Rivera	President of Uruguay; 1854-1855	Succeeded by Luis Lamas
