= Pradmyestse =

Pradmyestse (Belarusian: прадмесце) literally means "suburb" in Belarusian language. It may also refer to the following places in Belarus:

- Aranskaye radmyestse (Arany) in Minsk
- Basiyalawskaye radmyestse (Vyesyalowka) in Minsk
- Kalvariyskaye pradmyestse in Minsk
- Rakawskaye pradmyestse in Minsk
- Pyatnitskaye pradmyestse in Minsk
- Tatarskaye pradmiescie (Tatarskaya Slabada) in Minsk
- Kamarowskaye pradmyestse (Kamarowka) in Minsk
- Lyachawskaye pradmyestse (Lyachawka) in Minsk
- Starazhowskaye pradmyestse (Starazhowka) in Minsk
- Hrushawskaye pradmyestse (Hrushawka) in Minsk
- Trayetskaye pradmyestse in Minsk
- Zanyomanskaye pradmyestse in Grodno
- Valynskaye pradmyestse (Zamuchaviečča) in Brest
- Chacherskaye pradmyestse in Gomel
- Karabanawskaye pradmyestse (Karabanawka) in Mogilev
- Bychawskaye pradmyestse in Mogilev
- Vilyenskaye pradmyestse in Mogilev
