= Commemorative banknote =

A commemorative banknote is a banknote issued to mark some particular event. Such notes include:

== Africa ==
- Commemorative banknotes of the Gambian dalasi
- Commemorative banknotes of the Zambian kwacha

== North, Central and South America ==
- Commemorative banknotes of the Brazilian real
- Commemorative banknotes of the Canadian dollar
- Commemorative banknotes of Costa Rica
- Commemorative banknotes of the Guyanese dollar

== Asia ==
- Commemorative banknotes of the Bangladeshi taka
- Commemorative banknotes of the Bhutanese ngultrum
- Commemorative banknotes of the Brunei dollar
- Commemorative banknotes of the Chinese renminbi
- Commemorative banknotes of the Hong Kong dollar
- Commemorative banknotes of the Indonesian rupiah
- Commemorative banknotes of the Kazakhstani tenge
- Commemorative banknotes of the Kyrgyzstani som
- Commemorative banknotes of the Macanese pataca
- Commemorative banknotes of the Malaysian ringgit
- Commemorative banknotes of the Philippine peso
- Commemorative banknotes of the Singapore dollar
- Commemorative banknotes of the Sri Lankan rupee
- Commemorative banknotes of the Thai baht

== Europe ==
- Commemorative banknotes of the Czech koruna
- Commemorative banknotes of the Romanian leu
- Commemorative banknotes of the Russian ruble
- Commemorative banknotes of the Transnistrian ruble
- Commemorative banknotes of the Ukrainian hryvnia

== Oceania ==
- Commemorative banknotes of the Fijian dollar
- Commemorative banknotes of the New Zealand dollar

== See also ==
- Commemorative coin
- List of buildings and structures illustrated on banknotes
- List of motifs on banknotes
