= Belarusian ruble =

Currency of Belarus

Belarusian Ruble
беларускі рубель (Belarusian); белорусский рубль (Russian); руб, р, Rbl
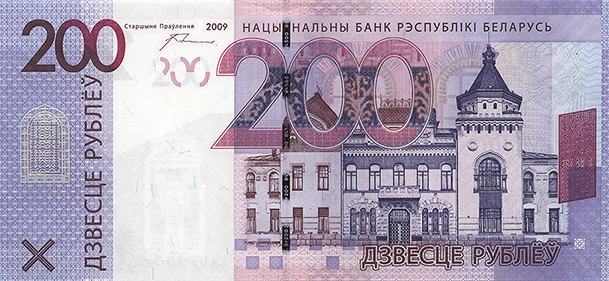
200 ruble banknote (third ruble, obverse)
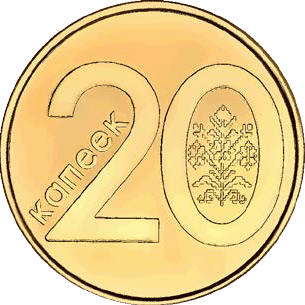
20 copeck coin (reverse)

ISO 4217
- Code: BYN (numeric: 933) before: BYB, BYR
- Subunit: 0.01

Units of account
- Plural: The language(s) of this currency belong(s) to the Slavic languages. There is more than one way to construct plural forms.
- Subunit
- 1/100: kopeck

Denominations
- Banknotes
- Freq. used: Rbls 5, Rbls 10, Rbls 20, Rbls 50, Rbls 100, Rbls 200
- Rarely used: Rbls 500
- Coins
- Freq. used: 1 cop, 2 cop, 5 cop, 10 cop, 20 cop, 50 cop, Rbl 1, Rbls 2

Demographics
- Date of introduction: 1 June 1994
- Replaced: Russian ruble
- User(s): Belarus

Issuance
- Central bank: National Bank of the Republic of Belarus
- Website: www.nbrb.by

Valuation
- Inflation: 5.5%
- Source: The Global Economy, 2024.

The Belarusian ruble, rouble or rubel (Belarusian: рубель, romanized: rubieĺ; Russian: рубль, romanized: rubl'; symbol:, ISO code: BYN) is the official currency of Belarus. It is subdivided into 100 kopecks (Belarusian: капейка, romanized: kapiejka, Russian: копейка, romanized: kopeyka).

The exchange rate of the Belarusian ruble is determined based on a basket of currencies consisting of the Russian ruble (with a weight of 60%), the US dollar (with a weight of 30%) and the renminbi (with a weight of 10%). The euro was part of said currency basket but was excluded in December 2022 due to a decrease in the volume of trade between Belarus and the European Union.

== History ==
=== First ruble (BYB), 1992–2000 ===
As a result of the breakup of the supply chain in the former Soviet enterprises, goods started to be bought and sold in the market, often requiring cash settlement. The Belarusian unit of the USSR State Bank had neither the capacity nor the licence to print Soviet banknotes, so the government decided to introduce its own national currency to ease the cash situation. The German word Thaler (Belarusian: талер), divided into 100 Groschen (Belarusian: грош) was suggested as the name for a Belarusian currency, but the Communist majority in the Supreme Soviet of Belarus rejected the proposal and stuck to the word ruble that had been used in Belarus from the times of the Soviet Union and the Russian Empire. The word ruble has also been used as a name for a currency in circulation in the medieval Grand Duchy of Lithuania, of which Belarus was a major part (see Lithuanian long currency).

From the collapse of the Soviet Union until May 1992, the Soviet ruble circulated in Belarus alongside the Belarusian ruble. New Russian ruble banknotes also circulated in Belarus, but were replaced by notes issued by the National Bank of the Republic of Belarus in May 1992. The first post-Soviet Belarusian ruble was assigned the ISO code BYB and replaced the Soviet currency at the rate of 1 Belarusian ruble = 10 Soviet/Russian rubles. It took about two years before the ruble became the official currency of the country in 1994 replacing Russian rubles.

=== Second ruble (BYR), 2000–2016 ===
In 2000, a new ruble was introduced (ISO 4217 code BYR), replacing the first at a rate of 1 BYR = 1,000 BYB. This was redenomination with three zeros removed. Only banknotes were issued; coins were minted solely as commemorative collectibles.

==== Monetary integration with Russia ====
From the beginning of his presidency in 1994, Alexander Lukashenko began to suggest the idea of integration with the Russian Federation, and undertook steps in this direction. The idea of introducing a united currency for the Union of Russia and Belarus was floated; Article 13 of the 1999 "Treaty of Creation of the Union State of Russia and Belarus" foresaw a unified currency. Belarus' economy was largely a Soviet-style centrally controlled one heavily reliant on cheap energy supplies from Russia. Discussions on the common currency continued well past the 2005 implementation goal set by both nations. Starting in 2008, the Central Bank of Belarus announced that the ruble would be tied to the United States dollar instead of the Russian ruble. Former bank chairman Stanislav Bogdankevich called it a political decision, tied to Belarus' open displeasure with Russia's hike of oil and gas export prices to Belarus earlier that year.

=== Third ruble (BYN), 2016–present ===
In July 2016, a new ruble was introduced (ISO 4217 code BYN), at a rate of 1 BYN = 10,000 BYR. Old and new rubles circulated in parallel from 1 July to 31 December 2016. Belarus also issued coins for general circulation for the first time. Seven banknote denominations (5-, 10-, 20-, 50-, 100-, 200-, and 500 rubles) and eight coin denominations (1-, 2-, 5-, 10-, 20-, and 50 copecks, and 1- and 2 rubles) are in circulation as of 1 July 2016. The banknotes have security threads and show 2009 as an issue date (the date of an unsuccessful attempt at currency reform).

== Coins ==
=== First series, 2016 ===
On December 27, 2016, for the first time in the Belarusian ruble's history, coins were introduced, due to the redenomination. Previously, Belarus was one of the few countries in the world never to have issued coins; this was largely due to rampant inflation, a problem since independence.

Slovakia offered to mint the coins, and provided prototypes. Coins of up to 5 copecks are struck in copper-plated steel; 10, 20, and 50 copeck coins are struck in brass-plated steel; 1 ruble coins are nickel-plated steel and 2 ruble coins a bi-metallic composition with a brass-plated steel ring and a nickel-plated steel center plug. All coins show the national emblem of Belarus, the inscription 'БЕЛАРУСЬ' (Belarus) and the year of minting on their obverse. The reverse shows the value of the coin and different symbolic ornaments.

2016 Belarusian ruble coins
Image		Value	Technical parameters				Description			Date of	
Obverse	Reverse	Value	Diameter (mm)	Thickness (mm)	Mass (g)	Composition	Edge	Obverse	Reverse	first minting	issue
		1 cop	15	1.25	1.55	Copper-plated steel	Plain	National emblem of Belarus, name of the country, year of minting	Value, the ornament symbolizing wealth and prosperity	2009	1 July 2016
		2 cop	17.5	1.25	2.10	Copper-plated steel	Plain	National emblem of Belarus, name of the country, year of minting	Value, the ornament symbolizing wealth and prosperity	2009	1 July 2016
		5 cop	19.8	1.25	2.7	Copper-plated steel	Plain	National emblem of Belarus, name of the country, year of minting	Value, the ornament symbolizing wealth and prosperity	2009	1 July 2016
		10 cop	17.7	1.80	2.8	Brass-plated steel	Reeded	National emblem of Belarus, name of the country, year of minting	Value, the ornament symbolizing fecundity and vital force	2009	1 July 2016
		20 cop	20.35	1.85	3.7	Brass-plated steel	Reeded	National emblem of Belarus, name of the country, year of minting	Value, the ornament symbolizing fecundity and vital force	2009	1 July 2016
		50 cop	22.25	1.55	3.95	Brass-plated steel	Reeded	National emblem of Belarus, name of the country, year of minting	Value, the ornament symbolizing fecundity and vital force	2009	1 July 2016
		Rbl 1	21.25	2.3	5.6	Nickel-plated steel	Reeded	National emblem of Belarus, name of the country, year of minting	Value, the ornament symbolizing the pursuit of happiness and freedom	2009	1 July 2016
		Rbls 2	23.5	2.0	5.81	Brass-plated steel ring with a nickel-plated steel center plug	Lettered	National emblem of Belarus, name of the country, year of minting, divided by Bahach ornament	Value, the ornament symbolizing the pursuit of happiness and freedom	2009	1 July 2016

=== Commemorative issues ===
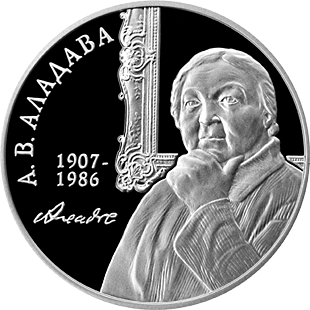
Alena Aladava, director of the Belarusian National Arts Museum, on the reverse of a centenary issue

Belarus is a large producer of commemorative coinage for the numismatic market, most particularly gold and silver bullion coins and non-circulating legal tender. Their designs range from fairly commonplace to unique and innovative ONE; themes range from "native culture and events" to fairy tales and pop culture topics unrelated to Belarus. A majority of these coins have a face value of 1 ruble; a few are 3-, 5 rubles and higher. Considered novelties, these coins are unlikely to be seen in general circulation.

== Banknotes ==
=== First ruble (BYB) ===
In 1992, banknotes were introduced in denominations of 50 copecks, and 1, 3, 5, 10, 25, 50, 100, 200, 500, 1,000, and 5,000 rubles. These were followed by banknotes of 20,000 rubles in 1994, 50,000 rubles in 1995, 100,000 rubles in 1996, 500,000 rubles in 1998 and 1,000,000 and 5,000,000 rubles in 1999.

1992 — 1999 series
Image		Value	Dimensions	Main Color	Description		Date of		
Obverse	Reverse	Value	Dimensions	Main Color	Obverse	Reverse	issue	withdrawal	lapse
		50 cop	105 × 53 mm	Orange-pink	Image of sciurus	Pahonia ("The Chase")	25 May 1992	1 January 2001	31 December 2000
		Rbl 1	105 × 53 mm	Grey blue	Image of the running European hare or "zaichik" which earned the currency its nickname	Pahonia ("The Chase")	25 May 1992	1 January 2001	31 December 2000
		Rbls 3	105 × 53 mm	Green	Image of beavers	Pahonia ("The Chase")	25 May 1992	1 January 2001	31 December 2000
		Rbls 5	105 × 53 mm	Blue and pink	Image of wolves	Pahonia ("The Chase")	25 May 1992	1 January 2001	31 December 2000
		Rbls 10	105 × 53 mm	Dark green	Image of the Eurasian lynx with kitten	Pahonia ("The Chase")	25 May 1992	1 January 2001	31 December 2000
		Rbls 25	105 × 53 mm	Orange	Image of moose	Pahonia ("The Chase")	25 May 1992	1 January 2001	31 December 2000
		Rbls 50	105 × 53 mm	Violet	Image of brown bear	Pahonia ("The Chase")	25 May 1992	1 January 2001	31 December 2000
		Rbls 100	105 × 53 mm	Green-brown	Image of wisent	Pahonia ("The Chase")	25 May 1992	1 January 2001	31 December 2000
		Rbls 200	105 × 53 mm	Yellow-green	Image of the train station square	Pahonia ("The Chase")	8 December 1992	1 January 2001	31 December 2000
		Rbls 500	105 × 53 mm	Violet-red	Victory Square, Minsk	Pahonia ("The Chase")	8 December 1992	1 January 2001	31 December 2000
		Rbls 1,000	105 × 53 mm	Green	National Academy of Sciences of Belarus in Minsk	Pahonia ("The Chase")	3 November 1993	1 January 2001	31 December 2003
		Rbls 1,000	110 × 60 mm	Green	National Academy of Sciences of Belarus in Minsk	Large image of the number 1,000	16 September 1998	1 January 2001	31 December 2003
		Rbls 5,000	105 × 60 mm	Red	Trinity Hill in Minsk	Pahonia	7 April 1994	1 January 2001	31 December 2003
		Rbls 5,000	110 × 60 mm	Red	Trinity Hill in Minsk	Large image of the number 5,000	16 September 1998	1 January 2001	31 December 2003
		Rbls 20,000	150 × 69 mm	Olive-yellow	National Bank of the Republic of Belarus	Pahonia	28 December 1994	1 January 2001	31 December 2003
		Rbls 50,000	150 × 69 mm	Light brown	Kholm Gate	Brest Fortress Memorial	15 September 1995	1 January 2001	31 December 2003
		Rbls 100,000	150 × 69 mm	Grey-brown	Opera and Ballet Theatre (Minsk)	Scene from the ballet "Favourite" («Избранница») by E.A. Hlebau	17 October 1996	1 January 2001	31 December 2003
		Rbls 500,000	150 × 69 mm	Orange-red	The Republican Trade Unions' Palace of Culture in Minsk	Architectural decorations on the Republican Palace of Culture of Belarus	1 December 1998	1 January 2001	31 December 2003
		Rbls 1,000,000	150 × 69 mm	Sky-blue	The National Museum of Arts of Belarus in Minsk	Fragment of the picture "Portrait of wife with flowers and fruits" by I. Khrutski	30 April 1999	1 January 2001	31 December 2003
		Rbls 5,000,000	150 × 69 mm	Light violet	Minsk Sports Palace	Image of the "Raubichy" sports complex	6 September 1999	1 January 2001	31 December 2003

=== Second ruble (BYR) ===
In 2000, notes were introduced in denominations of 1, 5, 10, 20, 50, 100, 500, 1,000, and 5,000 rubles (BYR), with 1 BYR = 1,000 BYB (first ruble). In 2001, higher denominations of 10,000, 20,000, and 50,000 rubles were introduced, followed by 100,000 rubles in 2005 and 200,000 rubles in 2012. There were no coins or banknotes issued in copecks.

"On 1 September 2010, new rules of Belarusian orthography came into force. According to the old rules, the correct spelling of the word "fifty" in Belarusian was пяцьдзесят (piaćdziesiat) but under the new rules, it should be spelled пяцьдзясят (piaćdziasiat) the difference being that the seventh character was the Cyrillic letter YE but is now the Cyrillic letter YA. As a result of these new rules, the existing 50 and 50,000 ruble notes dated 2000 now technically contain errors where the denominations are spelled out on the notes. On 29 December 2010, the National Bank of Belarus introduced new 50- and 50,000-ruble banknotes to bring the inscriptions on the notes into compliance with the new rules of Belarusian spelling and punctuation. The images, colors, and sizes of the notes remain consistent with the preceding issues of the same denominations dated 2000. The modified 50 ruble notes also no longer has a security thread, and the modified 50,000 ruble notes have replaced the solid security thread for a 2mm-wide windowed security thread."

2000 Series
Image		Value	Dimensions	Main Color	Description		Date of		
Obverse	Reverse	Value	Dimensions	Main Color	Obverse	Reverse	issue	withdrawal	lapse
		Rbl 1	110 × 60 mm	Green	The building of the National Academy of Sciences of Belarus	Denomination in figures	1 January 2000	1 January 2003	31 December 2003
		Rbls 5	110 × 60 mm	Rose-red	View of the Trayetskaye Pradmyestsye in Minsk	Denomination in figures	1 January 2000	1 September 2004	30 June 2005
		Rbls 10	110 × 60 mm	Light blue	The building of the National Library of Belarus	Denomination in figures	1 January 2000	1 March 2013	31 March 2014
		Rbls 20	150 × 69 mm	Olive-yellow	The building of the National Bank of Belarus	The interior of the building of the National Bank of Belarus	1 January 2000	1 March 2013	31 March 2014
		Rbls 50	150 × 69 mm	Orange-red	The Kholm Gate - fragment of the Memorial Brest Hero-Fortress	The main entrance to the Memorial Brest Hero-Fortress	1 January 2000	1 July 2015	1 July 2016
		Rbls 100	150 × 69 mm	Green	The National Academic Great Opera and Ballet House of Belarus in Minsk	Scene from ballet "Favourite" by E.A. Hlebau	1 January 2000	1 January 2017	1 January 2022
		Rbls 500	150 × 74 mm	Light brown	The Republican Trade Unions' Palace of Culture in Minsk	Architectural decorations on the Republican Palace of Culture of Belarus	1 January 2000	1 January 2017	1 January 2022
		Rbls 1,000	150 × 74 mm	Light blue	The National Museum of Arts of Belarus in Minsk	Fragment of the picture "Portrait of the wife with flowers and fruits" by I. Khrutski	1 January 2000	1 January 2017	1 January 2022
		Rbls 5,000	150 × 74 mm	Light violet	Minsk Sports Palace	Image of the "Raubichy" sporting complex	1 January 2000	1 January 2017	1 January 2022
		Rbls 10,000	150 × 74 mm	Pink	Panorama of Vitebsk city	Summer amphitheatre in Vitebsk	16 April 2001	1 January 2017	1 January 2022
		Rbls 20,000	150 × 74 mm	Grey	Gomel Palace	A view of the palace from A. Idzkouski's picture in Homyel	21 January 2002	1 January 2017	1 January 2022
		Rbls 50,000	150 × 74 mm	Sky blue	A castle in the settlement of Mir, Karelichy district, Grodno Region	Decorative collage of architectural elements of Mir Castle	20 December 2002	1 January 2017	1 January 2022
		Rbls 100,000	150 × 74 mm	Orange	The Nesvizh Castle	View of the Radziwills' Castle in Niasvizh from a painting by the Belarusian artist Napoleon Orda	15 July 2005	1 January 2017	1 January 2022
		Rbls 200,000	150 × 74 mm	Light green	The Mogilev Maslennikov Art Museum	Decorative collage of architectural elements of the museum building	12 March 2012	1 January 2017	1 January 2022

=== Third ruble (BYN) ===
In 2016, banknotes were introduced in denominations of 5, 10, 20, 50, 100, 200, and 500 rubles (BYN), with 1 BYN = 10,000 BYR (second ruble). On 4 November 2015, the National Bank of the Republic of Belarus announced that the banknotes that had been in use at that time would be replaced by the new ones due to the upcoming redenomination. The redenomination would be made in a ratio of 1:10,000 (10,000 rubles of the 2000 series = 1 ruble of the 2009 series). This currency reform also brought the introduction of coins, for the first time in The Republic of Belarus.

The banknotes are printed by the United Kingdom-based banknote manufacturer, security printing, paper-making and cash handling systems company De La Rue. As for coins, they have been minted by both the Lithuanian Mint and the Kremnica Mint. Both banknotes and coins were ready in 2009, but the 2008 financial crisis prevented them from being put into circulation immediately, resulting in a 7-year delay conditional on the necessity to lower inflation. Their designs are very similar to the euro banknotes.

2009 Series
Image		Value	Dimensions	Main Color	Description		Date of			
Obverse	Reverse	Value	Dimensions	Main Color	Obverse	Reverse	printing	issue	withdrawal	lapse
		Rbls 5	135 × 72 mm	Orange	Belaya Vezha in Kamyanyets	collage on the theme of the first Slavic settlements	2009; 2019; 2020; 2022 (5, 10, 20, 50 and 100 ruble banknotes)	1 July 2016	Current	Current
		Rbls 10	139 × 72 mm	Light Blue	Transfiguration Church in Polatsk	collage on the theme of enlightenment and printing	2009; 2019; 2020; 2022 (5, 10, 20, 50 and 100 ruble banknotes)	1 July 2016	Current	Current
		Rbls 20	143 × 72 mm	Yellow	Rumyantsev-Paskevich Residence in Homyel	collage on the theme of spirituality	2009; 2019; 2020; 2022 (5, 10, 20, 50 and 100 ruble banknotes)	1 July 2016	Current	Current
		Rbls 50	147 × 72 mm	Green	Mir Castle in Mir	collage on the theme of art	2009; 2019; 2020; 2022 (5, 10, 20, 50 and 100 ruble banknotes)	1 July 2016	Current	Current
		Rbls 100	151 × 72 mm	Turquoise	Niasvizh Castle in Nesvizh	collage on the theme of theater and folk holidays	2009; 2019; 2020; 2022 (5, 10, 20, 50 and 100 ruble banknotes)	1 July 2016	Current	Current
		Rbls 200	155 × 72 mm	Violet	Regional Museum of Art in Mahilyow	collage on the theme of crafts and town-planning	2009; 2019; 2020; 2022 (5, 10, 20, 50 and 100 ruble banknotes)	1 July 2016	Current	Current
		Rbls 500	159 × 72 mm	Pink and Blue	The building of the National Library of Belarus in Minsk	collage on the theme of literature	2009; 2019; 2020; 2022 (5, 10, 20, 50 and 100 ruble banknotes)	1 July 2016	Current	Current

== Exchange rates ==
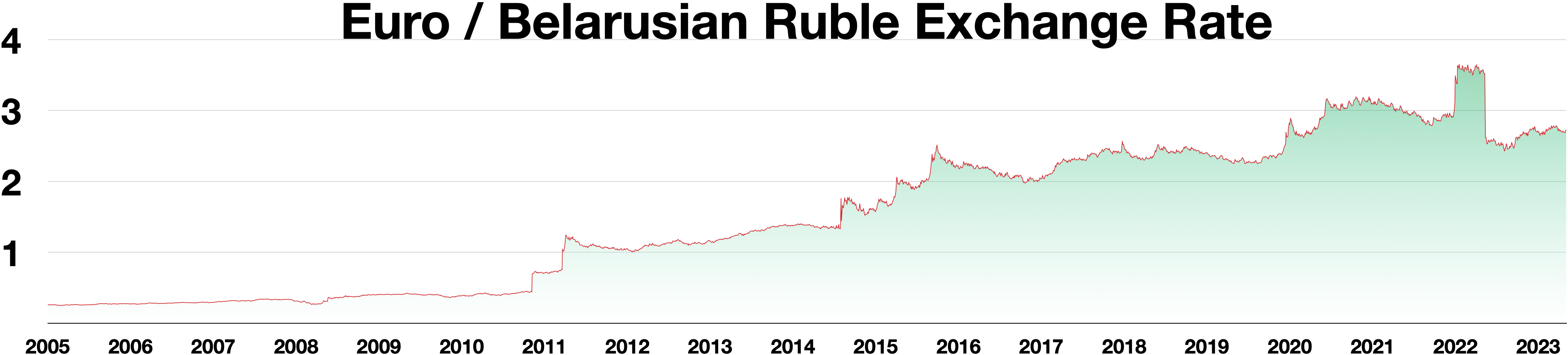
Euro / Belarusian ruble

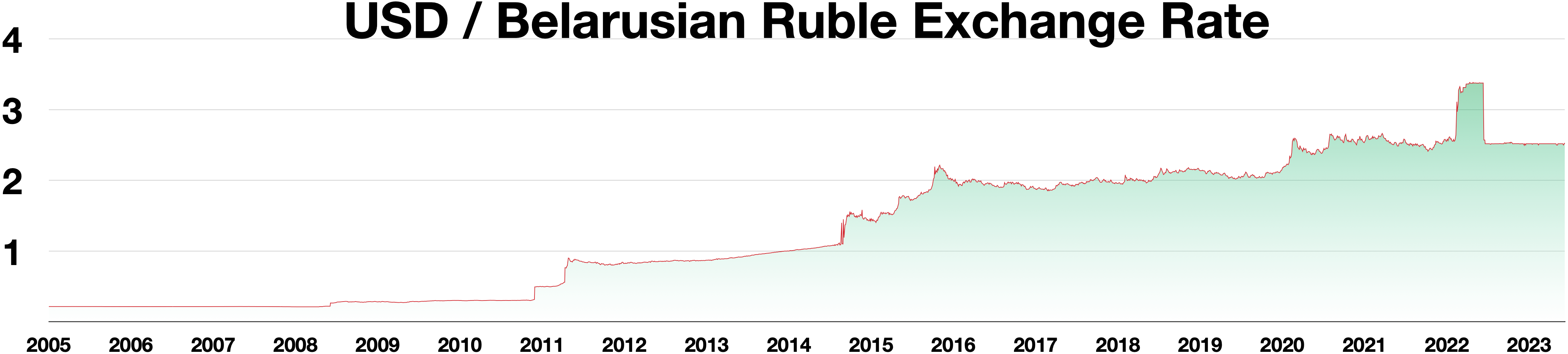
USD / Belarusian Ruble

On 2 January 2009, the National Bank of the Republic of Belarus lowered the exchange rate of the ruble by 50%.

On 24 May 2011, the National Bank of the Republic of Belarus lowered the exchange rate of the ruble by 56%. Alexei Moiseev, chief economist at Russia's VTB Capital, said at the time that "a '91-style meltdown is almost inevitable", referring to the crisis which accompanied the dissolution of the Soviet Union.

On 20 October 2011, the exchange rate of the ruble dropped 42% (from Rbl 5,712 to Rbl 8,680 per US$) when it was fully floated following demands to do so by Russia and the IMF.

In January 2015, the National Bank of the Republic of Belarus devalued its currency by 23% against the US dollar despite efforts to keep Russia's currency crisis from spreading across the border. As of 1 February, one U.S. dollar was worth Rbls 15,400; by Tuesday, it fell to Rbls 15,450 to the dollar, as per data from the Belarusian Central Bank's website.

As of mid-March 2022, the Belarusian ruble had reached an all-time low of Rbls 3.33 per US$1, during fallout from the 2022 Russian invasion of Ukraine. On 1 April 2022, it traded at Rbls 3.26 per US$, and had lost 21.5% of its value year-to-date. From 15 July 2022 to 1 October 2023 the currency was fixed at the rate of 2.5 in order to pay debts; since then its value remains fixed at 3.27

Current BYN exchange rates
From Google Finance:	AUD CAD CHF CNY EUR GBP HKD JPY USD RUB
From Yahoo! Finance:	AUD CAD CHF CNY EUR GBP HKD JPY USD RUB
From XE.com:	AUD CAD CHF CNY EUR GBP HKD JPY USD RUB
From OANDA:	AUD CAD CHF CNY EUR GBP HKD JPY USD RUB

== See also ==
- Economy of Belarus
- Ruble
- Belarusian ruble sign
