= List of buildings and structures illustrated on banknotes =

These buildings and structures are illustrated on banknotes of the listed countries.

== Afghanistan ==
- Blue Mosque, Mazar-i-Sharif
- Ahmed Shah Durrani mausoleum, Kadahar
- Tomb of Mahmud of Ghazni
- Shah Do Shamira Mosque
- Salang Pass
- Paghman Gardens
- Bala Hissar
- Arg (Presidential Palace), Kabul
- Pul e Khishti Mosque
- Arch of Bost
- Khwaja Abdullah Ansari Mosque
- Kandahar International Airport
- Shrine of Ali
- Tomb of Ahmad Shah Durrani Baba

== Albania ==
- First Albanian Parliament building
- Birthplace of Frashëri
- Vlorë independence building
- Church of Vau
- Amphitheatre at Butrinto (near Saranda)
- Krujë Castle

== Algeria ==
- Place of the Martyrs, Algiers

== Angola ==
- Serra da Leba
- Headquarters of the Banco Nacional de Angola
- Luanda

== Argentina ==
- Museo Mitre
- Monument to the Army of the Andes
- Monument to the National flag of Argentina, Rosario
- Casa Rosada
- Darwin Cemetery, light cruiser General Belgrano, the Falkland Islands
- Ara Pacis

== Armenia ==
- Yerevan Train Station and statue of David of Sasun
- Urartian cuneiform tablet and a lion relief from the Erebuni fortress
- National Gallery and History Museum of Armenia
- Armenian parliament building
- Mount Ararat and Zvartnots Cathedral
- Armenian Opera Theater
- St. Hripsime Church in Echmiadzin
- Mesrop Mashtots statue and Matenadaran
- Temple of Garni
- Byurakan Observatory
- Government House in Yerevan
- Gyumri
- Etchmiadzin Cathedral

== Australia ==
- Old Parliament House and New Parliament House

== Azerbaijan ==
- Palace of the Shirvanshahs
- Maiden Tower

== Bahamas ==
- Hope Town, Abaco Island

== Bahrain ==
- Old Bahrain Court
- Bahrain International Circuit
- Al Hedya Al Khalifiya School
- Sail and Pearl monument
- Shaikh Isa House, Muharraq
- Riffa Fort
- Shaikh Isa Bin Salman Al Khalifa Causeway
- Al Fateh Islamic Center

== Bangladesh ==
- Shahid Minar
- Mehrab
- Baitul Mukarram
- Jatiyo Sangsad Bhaban
- Bagha Mosque
- Jatiyo Smriti Soudho (National Martyrs' Memorial)
- Bangabandhu Bridge (Jamuna Multi-purpose Bridge)
- Curzon Hall
- Headquarters of the Security Printing Corporation
- Bangladesh National Museum

== Barbados ==
- Morgan Lewis Windmill, St. Andrew
- 3Ws Oval cricket facility at the University of the West Indies, Cave Hill Campus
- Charles Duncan O’Neal Bridge over the Careenage, Bridgetown
- Parliament Buildings in Bridgetown
- Independence Square with statue of Errol Barrow in Bridgetown
- Grantley Adams International Airport

== Belarus ==
- Belaya Vezha, Kamyanyets
- Transfiguration Church, Polatsk
- Rumyantsev-Paskevich Residence, Homyel
- Mir Castle, Mir
- Niasvizh Castle, Nyasvizh
- Regional Museum of Art, Mahilyow
- National Library of Belarus, Minsk
- Victory Square, Minsk
- National Academy of Sciences of Belarus
- Trinity Hill
- Headquarters of the National Bank of the Republic of Belarus
- Kholm Gate
- Brest Fortress Memorial
- Opera and Ballet Theatre (Minsk)
- Republican Trade Unions' Palace of Culture, Minsk
- National Museum of Arts of Belarus, Misnk
- Minsk Sports Palace
- "Raubichy" sports complex
- Trayetskaye Pradmyestsye, Minsk
- Kholm Gate
- Summer amphitheatre, Vitebsk
- Mogilev Maslennikov Art Museum

== Belize ==
- Maya ruins of Belize (Altun Ha Temple, Xunantunich)
- St. George's Caye, coffin of Thomas Potts
- Government House
- Court House
- St. John's Cathedral
- Central Bank of Belize

== Bermuda ==
- St. David's Lighthouse
- Camden House
- Dockkyard Clock Tower
- Somerset Bridge
- Commissioner's House
- Gibbs Hill Lighthouse
- St. Mark's Church
- St. Peter's Church
- House of Assembly of Bermuda

== Bhutan ==
- Simtokha Dzong
- Taktsang
- Paro Rinpung Dzong
- Punakha Dzong
- Trongsa Dzong
- Tashichho Dzong

== Bulgaria ==
- Bulgarian National Bank (Saint Nicholas)

== Denmark ==
- Great Belt Fixed Link
- Knippelsbro
- Little Belt Bridge
- Queen Alexandrine Bridge
- Sallingsund Bridge

== Eastern Caribbean States ==
- Government House, Montserrat
- Brimstone Hill Fortress National Park, view of the twin peaks of Les Pitons Volcano – Petit Piton and Gros Piton near Soufrière in Saint Lucia
- Eastern Caribbean Central Bank headquarters

== Falkland Islands ==
- Christ Church Cathedral
- Government House

== Guernsey ==
- Elizabeth College
- Fort Grey

== Jersey ==
- Elizabeth Castle
- Government House
- La Corbière Lighthouse
- La Hougue Bie
- Le Hocq Tower
- Les Augrès Manor
- Mont Orgueil
- Parish Church of St Helier
- Victoria College

== Isle of Man ==
- Castle Rushen
- Laxey Wheel
- Peel Castle

== Indonesia ==
=== 2004-2016 ===
- Parliament complex, Jakarta
- Pura Ulun Danu Bratan
- Limas house

=== 1992-1995 ===
- Soekarno-Hatta International Airport
- Borobudur temple, Yogyakarta

=== 1984-1988 ===
- Menara Kudus Mosque
- Keraton Yogyakarta
- Bank Indonesia office, Cirebon
- Asahan Dam

== Malaysia ==
- National Mosque
- Malaysian Houses of Parliament

== New Zealand ==
- New Zealand Parliament Buildings, including The Beehive
- Porourangi Meeting House

== Norway ==
- Akershus Fortress
- Borgund Stave Church
- Eidsvollsbygningen
- Haakon's Hall
- Hylestad Stave Church
- Nidaros Cathedral
- Norwegian National Opera
- University of Oslo

== Poland ==
- Rotunda of Saint Nicolas in Cieszyn
- Malbork Castle
- Wawel Castle
- Wilanów Palace

== Philippines ==
- Barasoain Church
- Malacañang Palace
- National Museum of Fine Arts
- Bangko Sentral ng Pilipinas
- Aguinaldo Shrine

== Taiwan ==
- Chung-Shan Building
- Presidential Office Building, Taipei

== Turkey ==
- Anıtkabir
- Atatürk Dam
- Bosphorus Bridge
- Çanakkale Martyrs' Memorial
- Central Bank of the Republic of Turkey
- Dardanelles
- Fountain of Ahmed III
- Grand National Assembly of Turkey
- Hippodrome of Constantinople
- Ishak Pasha Palace
- Istanbul University
- İzmir Clock Tower
- Kızıl Kule
- Maiden's Tower
- Mevlana Museum
- Rumelihisarı
- Samsun
- Selimiye Mosque
- Sivas
- Süleymaniye Mosque
- Ulus, Ankara

== Ukraine ==
- National Bank of Ukraine (building)
- National Opera of Ukraine
- Saint Sophia Cathedral, Kyiv
- Kyiv Pechersk Lavra
- Lviv Theatre of Opera and Ballet
- Teacher's House
- Red University Building
- Lubart's Castle
- National University of Kyiv-Mohyla Academy
- National Academy of Sciences of Ukraine

== United States ==
- Independence Hall
- Lincoln Memorial
- Treasury Building (Washington, D.C.)
- United States Capitol
- White House
- pyramid

== United Kingdom ==
- Newgate Prison
- St Paul's Cathedral
- Threadneedle Street
- Worcester Cathedral

=== Northern Ireland ===
- Belfast City Hall
- Dunluce Castle
- Giant's Causeway
- Old Bushmills Distillery
- Port of Belfast
- Queen's University Belfast

=== Scotland ===
- Antonine Wall
- Balmoral Castle
- Brig o' Doon
- Brodick Castle
- Culzean Castle
- Edinburgh Castle
- Edinburgh International Conference Centre
- Falkirk Wheel
- Forth Bridge
- Glamis Castle
- University of Glasgow
- Glenfinnan Viaduct
- Heart of Neolithic Orkney
- Holmwood House
- Inverness Castle
- Kessock Bridge
- The Lighthouse, Glasgow
- New Lanark
- New Town, Edinburgh
- Old Town, Edinburgh
- Stirling Castle

== Zimbabwe ==
- Balancing rocks of Zimbabwe
- National Heroes' Acre (Zimbabwe)
- Kariba Dam
