= Andrei Danilov (conductor) =

Russian conductor

Andrei Danilov (Russian: Андрей Данилов; born 1978) is a Russian conductor who has led numerous orchestral and operatic performances across Europe and Asia. A graduate of the Special School of Music of the Rimsky-Korsakov Conservatoire, he has served as a conductor for the National Opera and Ballet of Belarus and the Novosibirsk Opera and Ballet Theatre. His career includes guest appearances with the Mariinsky Theatre Orchestra and the State Academic Symphony Orchestra of the Russian Federation, as well as receiving the Golden Mask award for his work at the Mikhailovsky Theatre.

== Early life ==
Danilov was born in Leningrad, where he attended piano lessons at the Special School of Music of the Rimsky-Korsakov Conservatoire. From 1995 to 2000 he was faculty of opera and symphony there under guidance from conductor Ilya Musin and then Yuri Temirkanov. Later on, he became a conductor of the National Opera and Ballet of Belarus where he conducted such performances as The Marriage of Figaro, Mavra and Eugene Onegin, and in memory of Ilya Musin, he conducted numerous performances with the Mariinsky Theatre Orchestra.

== Career ==
=== 2001-2002 ===
From 2000 to 2002, he was an intern at the Royal Northern College of Music in Manchester, England, where he appeared with various music ensembles and conducted operas such as Falstaff and The Queen of Spades. As of July 2001 he was an occasional member of the Northern Sinfonia of Newcastle upon Tyne and in 2002 made his debut as a conductor of both the Academic Symphony Orchestra and Shostakovich Philharmonic of Saint Petersburg.

=== 2003-2005 ===
From 2003 to 2005 Danilov was an assistant conductor of the Caucasian Symphonic Orchestra at Mineralnye Vody and was also an Amadeus Chamber Orchestra's music director. Between 2003 and 2005 he was conductor of the Academic Symphonic Orchestra of Saint Petersburg and conducted an opening ceremony of the Spanish Music Festival the same year. In 2005 he began working with the Novosibirsk Opera and Ballet Theatre with which he had performances in France, South Korea, China, and Thailand in which he conducted such ballets as Igor Stravinsky's Apollo and Pulcinella as well as Ludwig Minkus's La Bayadère and Tchaikovsky's Serenade.

=== 2005-2009 ===
From 2005 to 2006 he made his first appearance in Moscow where he was a conductor of the State Academic Symphony Orchestra of the Russian Federation along with Yevgeny Svetlanov. In 2007 he performed Gustav Mahler's Symphony No. 2 at the Moscow Conservatory's great hall with Russian National Philharmonic Orchestra. He served as a guest conductor at the Mikhailovsky Theatre from 2008 to 2009; following his tenure there, he was awarded the Golden Mask.
