= Be (Cyrillic) =

Letter of the Cyrillic script

Б (Buky/бѹкꙑ)
- Б б
- (See below)

Usage
- Writing system: Cyrillic script
- Type: Alphabetic
- Language of origin: Old Church Slavonic
- Sound values: [b] [p] [β]
- In Unicode: U+0411, U+0431
- Alphabetical position: 2

History
Development
O1
        - Β β
          - Б б
- Time period: ~900 to present
- Sisters: B b; B β; В в; Ƃ ƃ
- Transliterations: B b (Latin script)
- Variations: (See below)

Other
- Writing direction: Left-to-right

Be (Б б; italics: Б б or Б б; italics: Б б) is a letter of the Cyrillic script. It commonly represents the voiced bilabial plosive /b/, like the English pronunciation of ⟨b⟩ in "ball". It should not be confused with the Cyrillic letter Ve (В в), which is shaped like Latin capital letter B but represents the voiced labiodental fricative /v/ or the voiced bilabial fricative /β/. The Cyrillic letter Б (Be) is romanized using the Latin letter B.

== History ==
The Cyrillic letters Be and Ve (В в) were both derived from the Greek letter Beta (Β β).

In the Early Cyrillic alphabet the name of the letter Be was бѹкꙑ (buky/буки), meaning "letter".

In the Cyrillic numeral system, the letter Be had no numeric value because the letter Ve inherited the Greek letter Beta's numeric value.

== Form ==
Printed forms (the font used is Cambria)

The Russian small letter б (be) is similar (but not identical) in shape to the digit 6. Its lowercase form also somewhat resembles a lowercase letter B ("b"), the letter to which it corresponds in the Latin alphabet. After all, the lowercase Latin letter B ("b") developed from scribal alterations to the capital letter B ("B"), just as б did from scribal alterations to the capital letter В ("Ve").

In Serbian and Macedonian the italic form is allowed to vary, but the regular should look like in other languages.

The cursive form of the lowercase letter Be resembles the lowercase Greek letter Delta (δ), but they are slightly different in their upper portions.

== Usage ==
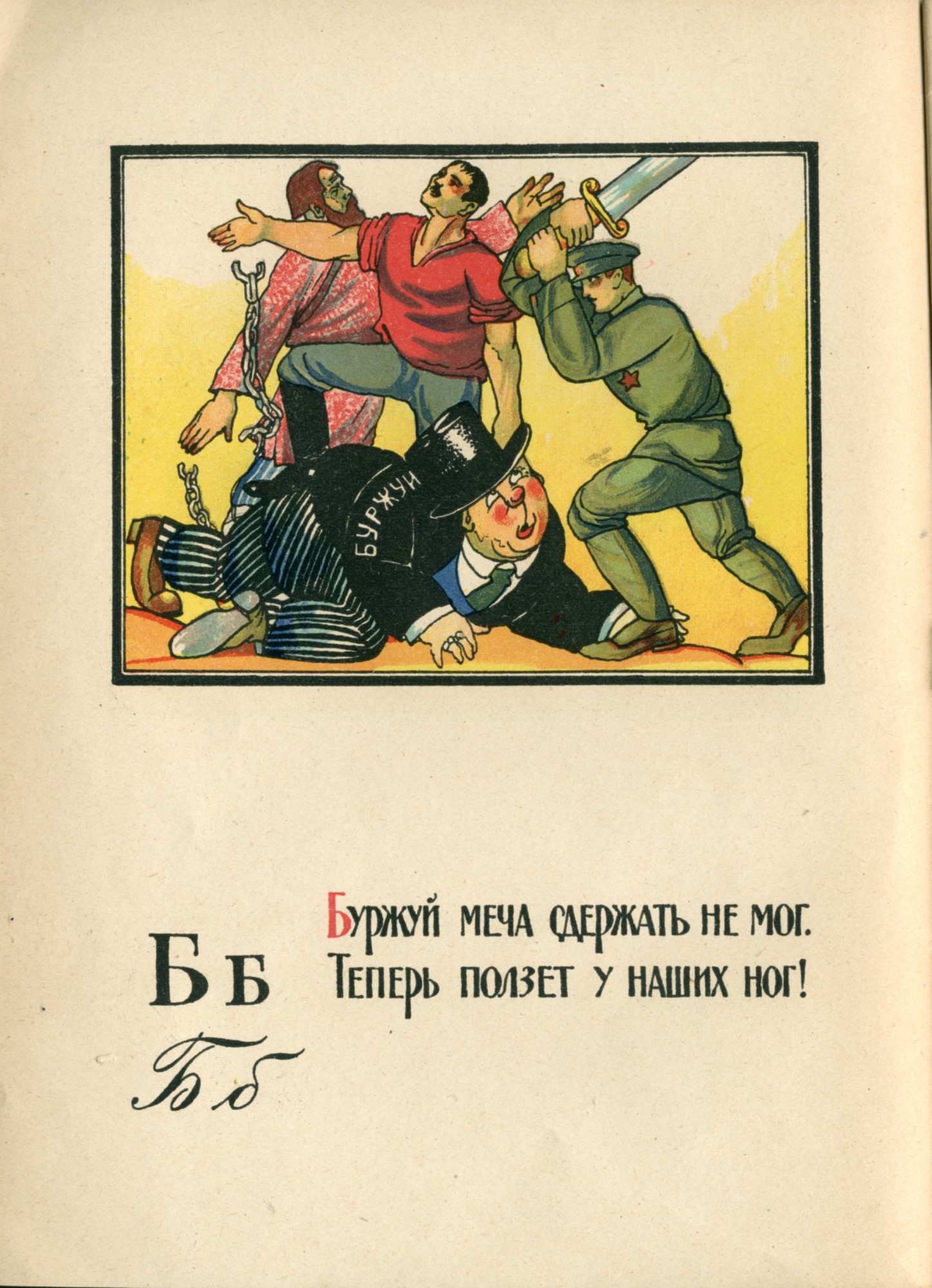
Be, from the Alphabet Book оf the Red Army soldier (1921)

In Russian and Bulgarian, the letter Be generally represents the voiced bilabial plosive /b/, but word-finally or before a voiceless consonant, it also represents the voiceless [p]. Before a palatalizing vowel, it represents /bʲ/. In Macedonian, the letter represents the sound /b/, but if it is in the final position of the word, it is pronounced as /p/, like in леб /lɛp/ ('bread').

In Mari, it may represent either /b/ or the voiced bilabial fricative /β/.

In Serbian, the letter represents the voiced bilabial plosive /b/, regardless of the position in the word.

== Related letters and other similar characters ==
- ⟨Β β⟩: Greek letter Beta
- ⟨В в⟩: Cyrillic letter Ve
- ⟨B b⟩: Latin letter B
- ⟨Ƃ ƃ⟩: Latin letter Ƃ
- ⟨⟩: Belarusian ruble sign

== Computing codes ==
- U+0411 Б CYRILLIC CAPITAL LETTER BE
- U+0431 б CYRILLIC SMALL LETTER BE
