= Margarita Abella Caprile =

Argentine writer (1901–1960)

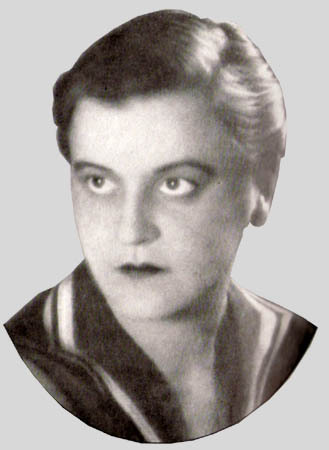
Margarita Abella Caprile

Margarita Abella Caprile (August 5, 1901 – October 28, 1960) was an Argentine writer and poet. Born in Buenos Aires, she was the daughter of Eduardo Abella and Margarita Caprile Mitre; and the great-granddaughter of General Bartolomé Mitre. She attended Colegio del Sagrado Corazon, Buenos Aires. Although she worked as a journalist and wrote travel books, novels, and short stories, she is known primarily as a poet. Since 1955, she replaced Eduardo Mallea as director of the literary supplement of the newspaper La Nación, where she worked until her death. Her contemporaries included Alfonsina Storni, Gabriela Mistral, Delmira Agustini, and Juana de Ibarbourou.

== Selected works ==
- Ensayos (1917)
- Nieve (1919)
- Perfiles en la niebla (1923)
- Sonetos (1931)
- Geografías (1936)
- 50 Poesías (1938)
- Sombras en el mar (1941)
- Lo miré con lágrimas (1950)
- El árbol derribado (1959)
