= Belarusian ruble sign =

Currency symbol of the Belarusian ruble

Belarusian ruble sign
- In Unicode: U+20C5 ⃅ <reserved-20C5>

Currency
- Currency: Belarusian ruble

Related
- See also: U+20BD ₽ RUBLE SIGN

The Belarusian ruble sign is the currency sign used for the Belarusian ruble, the official currency of Belarus. It is based on the Cyrillic capital letter "Б", the initial letter of the country's native name (Беларусь). The design was approved by the Board of the National Bank of the Republic of Belarus on 27 January 2026.

== Design ==
The ruble sign is based on the Cyrillic capital letter "Б", the first letter of "Беларусь" (Belarus), linking the design to the country and its currency. AIt includes a horizontal line within the letter, positioned parallel to the upper stroke. It was designed to be consistent with the general stylistic conventions of international currency symbols.

== History ==
=== First design (2005) ===
On 12 May 2005, the National Bank of the Republic of Belarus adopted a graphic symbol for the Belarusian ruble, consisting of the Latin letters "Br", following a competition that attracted around 5,000 submissions. Many proposals incorporated national elements, although most were based on the letters "B" and "R". The symbol was intended for domestic use only. Three authors, Alexander Gudoshnikov, Sergey Reznik, and Alexander Sedortsov, were jointly awarded for submitting the design.

=== New symbol competition (2025) ===
On 24 September 2025, the National Bank of the Republic of Belarus announced an open competition to design a new graphical symbol for the national currency, as the previous "Br" sign had failed to achieve widespread adoption. The expert committee received nearly 2,700 submissions and shortlisted five projects. The final winner was determined based on the committee's evaluation combined with a public online vote, which drew 22,146 participants. The winning design by Vasily Shchebetun received the highest combined score and was approved by the Board of the National Bank on 27 January 2026. The author was awarded 3,000 Belarusian rubles.

=== Results and adoption ===
The results were announced on 31 December 2025. The winning design features a capital Cyrillic letter "Б" with a horizontal strike through the lower left section. The National Bank officially approved the new symbol on 27 January 2026.

The character has been assigned the code point U+20C5 in the Currency Symbols block in the Unicode standard, with an official release scheduled for the second half of 2027 as part of Unicode version 19.0.

== See also ==
- Ruble sign
