= Sri Lankan commemorative coins =

The Central Bank of Sri Lanka has issued commemorative coins since 1957.

On 15 December 2010, the Central Bank of Sri Lanka issued a Frosted Proof crown size multi-colour silver commemorative coin in the denomination of Rupees 5000 for the bank's 60th anniversary. It was the first multi-colour coin issued by the Central Bank.

Commemorative coins issued by the Central Bank of Sri Lanka:

Commemorative Coins of Sri Lanka
Image	Value (Rs.)	Description	Obverse	Reverse	Diameter/Size (mm)	Metal	Weight (Grams)	Year
	5	2500th Anniversary of the passing away of Buddha (Buddha Jayanthi)			38.61	Silver (0.925)	28.28	1957
	1	2500th Anniversary of the passing away of Buddha (Buddha Jayanthi)			28.50	Copper; Nickel	11.31	1957
	2	2nd World Food Congress			31.50	Copper; Nickel	12.35	1968
	5	5th Non-Aligned Summit Conference			32.84	Nickel	13.60	1976
	2	5th Non-Aligned Summit Conference			30.00	Copper; Nickel	13.50	1976
	1	1st Executive Presidency (J. R. Jayawardhane)			24.50	Copper; Nickel	7.13	1978
	1	1st Executive Presidency (J. R. Jayawardhane)			24.50	Gold; 22 Caret	12.00	1978
	5	50 Years of Universal Adult Franchise			29.0 / 30.28	Copper; Nickel	9.60	1981
	2	The Mahaweli Development Scheme			28.50	Copper; Nickel	8.25	1981
	5	International Year of Shelter for the Homeless			25.0 – 30.0	Copper; Nickel	11.70	1987
	500	40th Anniversary of Central Bank of Sri Lanka			38.61	Silver	28.28	1990
	100	5th South Asian Federation Games – Colombo			22.0 – 29.4	Silver	10.20	1991
	500	5th South Asian Federation Games – Colombo			14	Gold; 12 Caret	1.6	1991
	1	3rd Anniversary of Induction of Executive Presidency – R. Premadasa			25.40	Copper; Nickel	7.13	1992
	500	2300 Anubudu Mihindu Jayanthi			38.61	Silver	28.28	1993
	5	50th Anniversary, United Nations			23.50	Ni / Br	9.50	1995
	5000	50th Anniversary of Sri Lanka regaining Independence			22.05	Gold (22 Caret)	7.98	1998
	1000	50th Anniversary of Sri Lanka regaining Independence			38.61	Silver	28.28	1998
	10	50th Anniversary of Sri Lanka regaining Independence			Outer ring 27.0 Inner disc 18.0	Bi Metal Outer ring Cu/Ni Inner disc Ni/Br	9.00	1998
	1000	Winning of the 1996 Cricket World Cup			38.61	Silver	28.28	1999
	5	Winning of the 1996 Cricket World Cup			23.50	Ni / Br	9.50	1999
	1	50th Anniversary of Sri Lanka Army			25.40	Nickel-plated steel	7.13	1999
	1000	50th Anniversary Central Bank of Sri Lanka			38.61	Silver	28.28	2000
	1000	50th Anniversary of Sri Lanka regaining Independence			38.61	Silver	28.28	1998
	1	50th Anniversary of Sri Lanka Navy			25.40	Cu-Ni	7.13	2000
	1	50th Anniversary of Sri Lanka Air Force			25.40	Cu / Ni	7.13	2000
	2	50th Anniversary of the Colombo Plan			28.50	Cu / Ni	8.25	2000
	5	250th Anniversary of Syamopasampadawa (Weliwita Sri Saranankara Sangaraja Mahimi)			23.50	Ni / Br	9.50	2003
	1500	2550th Anniversary of the passing away of Buddha			38.61	Silver (0.925)	28.28	2006
	2000	2550th Anniversary of the passing away of Buddha			38.61	Silver (selective gold-plated)	28.28	2006
	5	2550th Anniversary of the passing away of Buddha			23.50	Brass-plated steel	9.50	2006
	1000	Cricket World Cup 2007 (Runner up)			32	Nickel-plated steel	12	2007
	5	Cricket World Cup 2007 (Runner up)			28.50	Brass-plated steel	7.00	2007
	1000	50th Anniversary of Employee's Provident Fund Commemorative Coin			28.50	Nickel-plated steel (brilliant uncirculated)	7.00	2008
	2	50th Anniversary of Employee's Provident Fund Commemorative Coin			28.50	Nickel-plated steel	7.00	2008
	200	Sri Lanka Customs Commemorative coin				Silver	10.50	2008
	1000	60th Anniversary of the Sri Lanka Army			28.50	Silver	11.90	2009
	1000	60th Anniversary of the Sri Lanka Army			28.50	Cu-Ni	8.25	2009
	5000	60th Anniversary Central Bank of Sri Lanka	Central Bank Crest	A tree depicting the growth and the stability of Sri Lanka's economy	38.61	Silver	28.28	2010
	2	60th Anniversary of the Sri Lanka Air Force	Logo of Sri Lanka Air Force in the centre. An artist's impression of a Chipmunk aircraft appears below the logo and another three aircraft; Mig 27, C 130, and MI 24 appear above the logo.	Two (face value) in large numerals and the words "Two Rupees" in Sinhala, Tamil and English appear across the face value.	28.5	Nickel-plated steel	7	2 March 2011
	2000	125th anniversary of Ananda College	At centre an image of Ananda Viharaya with rays above depicting impact of knowledge and education. Below from left to right portraits of Hikkaduwa Sri Sumangala Thera (1827–1911), Migettuwatte Gunananda Thera (1823–1890), and Colonel Henry Steele Olcott (1832–1907) as founders of Ananda with anniversary dates 1886-2011 inside a semi-circle.	At centre above the Ananda College crest, the face value 2000 in numerals below RUPEES in Sinhala, English and Tamil. The crest in the shape of a shield has the standing Sinhala Lion below the Buddhist Stupa with radiant pinnacle. On top the motto in Pali, Appamdho Amathapadhan – Buddhist quote from the Apramadha Vagga in the Dhammapada meaning: "Heedfulness leads to Nirvana".	38.61	Silver	28.28	2011
Front side of the commemorative 20 rupee coin issued for the 70th anniversary of the Central Bank of Sri Lanka. Rear of the 20 Rupee coin.	20	70th anniversary of the Central Bank of Sri Lanka. The coin is a heptagon and consists of 7 sides (7 lobed coin).	The image of the headquarters of Central Bank of Sri Lanka with 70 which depicts the anniversary. It also includes the years of operation of the Central Bank of Sri Lanka (1950 – 2020). The text "Central Bank of Sri Lanka" is written in all three main languages Sinhala, Tamil & English.	20 (which is the face value) of the coin is shown in the reverse with the text "Twenty Rupees" written in all three main languages Sinhala, Tamil & English. The text "Sri Lanka" is also written in Sinhala, Tamil & English.	28mm diameter and 2mm thickness	Aluminium Bronze	-	2020

== See also ==
- Coins of the Sri Lankan rupee
- Sri Lankan commemorative notes
