= Bartolomé Mitre =

President of Argentina (1821–1906)

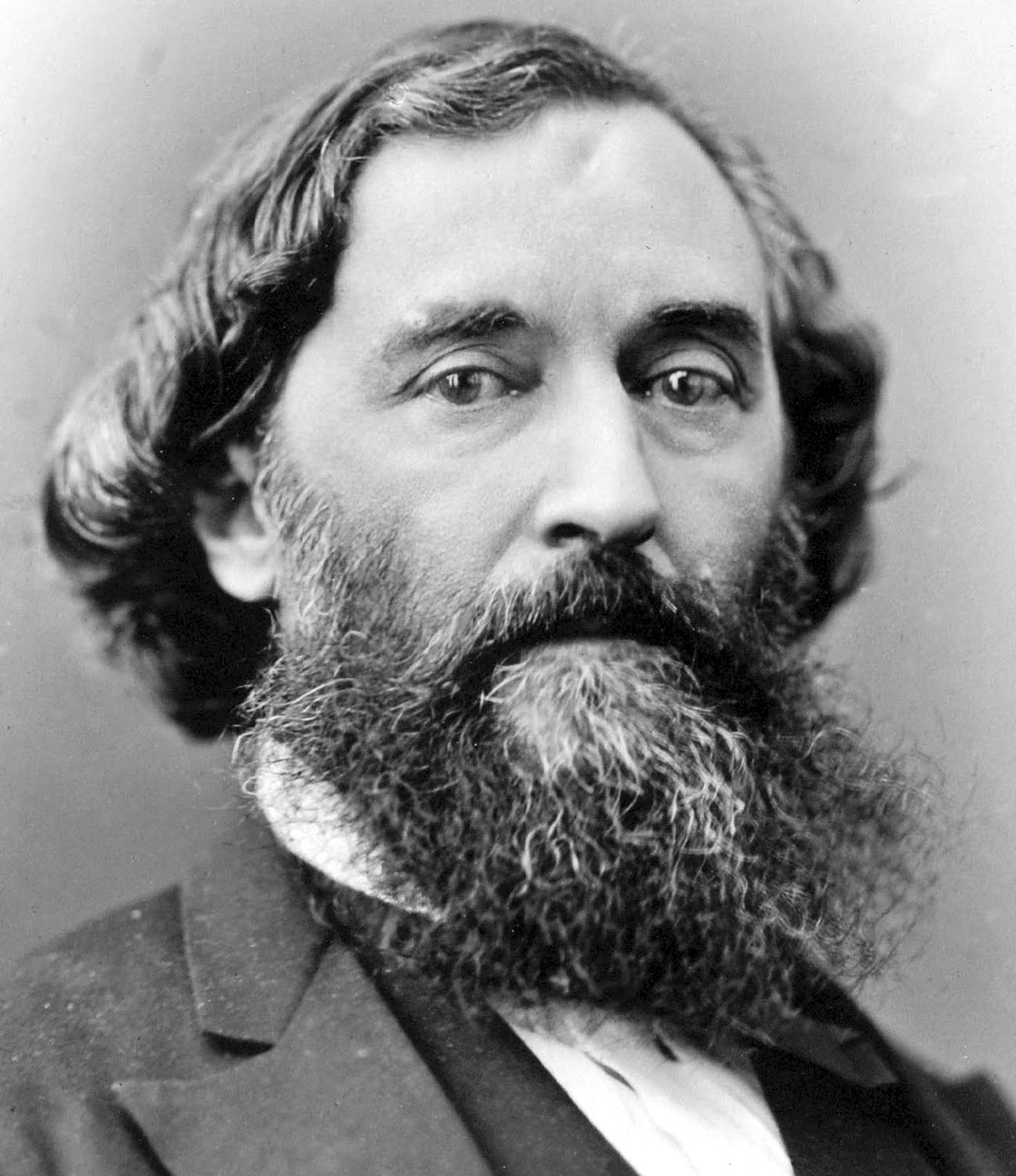

President of Argentina
- In office 12 October 1862 – 12 October 1868
- Interim; 12 December 1861 – 12 October 1862
- Vice President: Marcos Paz
- Succeeded by: Domingo Faustino Sarmiento

7th Governor of Buenos Aires
- In office 3 May 1860 – 11 October 1862
- Vice Governor: Manuel Ocampo; Vicente Cazón
- Preceded by: Felipe Llavallol
- Succeeded by: Vicente Cazón

Personal details
- Born: 26 June 1821 Buenos Aires, Argentina
- Died: 19 January 1906 (aged 84) Buenos Aires, Argentina
- Resting place: La Recoleta Cemetery
- Party: Colorado (Uruguay); Unitary (1851–1862); Liberal (1862–1874); National (1874); Civic Union (1890–1891); National Civic Union (1891–1906)
- Spouse: Delfina Vedia

Military service
- Allegiance: Argentina
- Branch/service: Argentine Army
- Rank: Lieutenant general

Bartolomé Mitre (26 June 1821 – 19 January 1906) was an Argentine general, statesman and author. He was President of Argentina from 1862 to 1868 and the first president of unified Argentina.

Mitre is known as a versatile statesman, military man, politician, journalist, historian, writer and poet. He was a major figure in the history of Argentina during the second half of the 19th century.

He was the figure that best characterized liberalism in Argentina, but he was a moderate and flexible liberal, not dogmatic.

== Early life ==
Mitre was born on 26 June 1821 in Buenos Aires. His father was of Greek descent, and the family name was originally Mitropoulos.

In 1831, his family settled in Uruguay. He became a soldier and graduated in 1839 from the Military School of Montevideo, with the rank of second lieutenant of artillery. Also, a journalist, his writings supported Fructuoso Rivera, who, in 1846, made him a lieutenant colonel in the Uruguayan Army.

Later, he joined the Colorado Party in the civil wars against the Blancos, in the Banda Oriental (Uruguay). This closeness with the Colorados led him to support the unitario faction of Argentina, which simultaneously fought against the Rosista regime in Buenos Aires, ally of the Uruguayan Blancos.

His first poems and journalistic publications in the Uruguayan media date from that time.

He then moved to Bolivia, and later to Chile, where he met fellow Argentine exile Juan Bautista Alberdi. Both wrote for the Valparaíso newspaper El Comercio. Later, he wrote in El Progreso, in Santiago, under the direction of Domingo Faustino Sarmiento.

== End of exile and return to Argentina ==
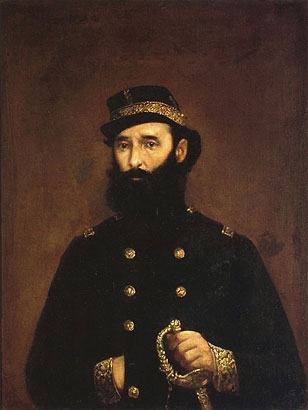
Mitre at the time of the Battle of Pavón, oil by Ignacio Manzoni, Mitre Museum.

Mitre returned to Argentina after the defeat of longtime caudillo Juan Manuel de Rosas at the 1852 Battle of Caseros. He was a leader of the revolt of Buenos Aires Province against Justo José de Urquiza's federal system in the Revolution of 11 September 1852, and was appointed to important posts in the provincial government after the Province seceded from the Confederation.

== Presidency (1861–1868) ==
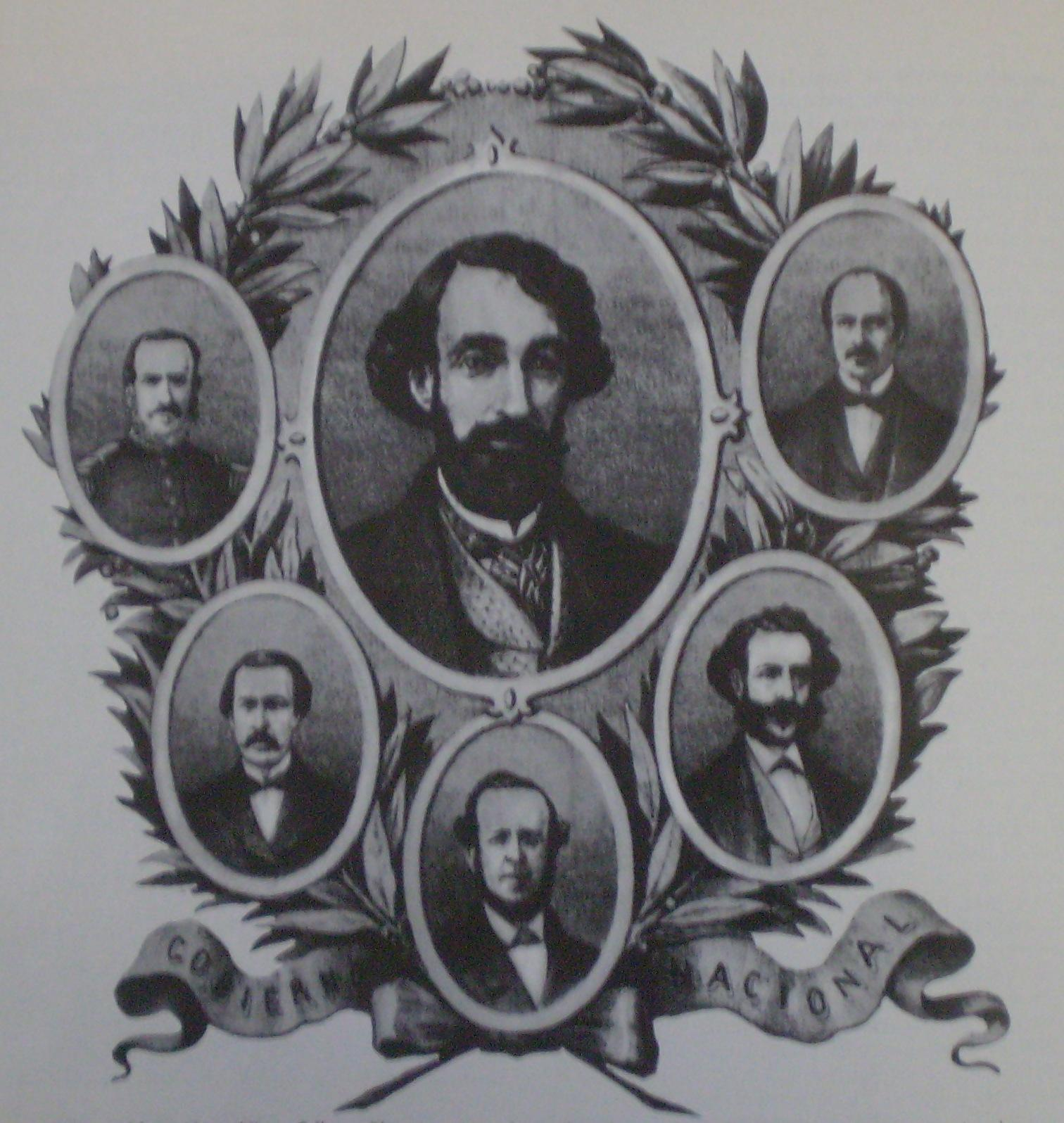
Mitre's cabinet: Gelly y Obes, Minister of War and Navy; Lucas González, Minister of Finance; Guillermo Rawson, Minister of the Interior; Rufino de Elizalde, Minister of Foreign Affairs and Worship; and Eduardo Costa, Minister of Justice and Public Instruction. (Drawing by H. Meyer).

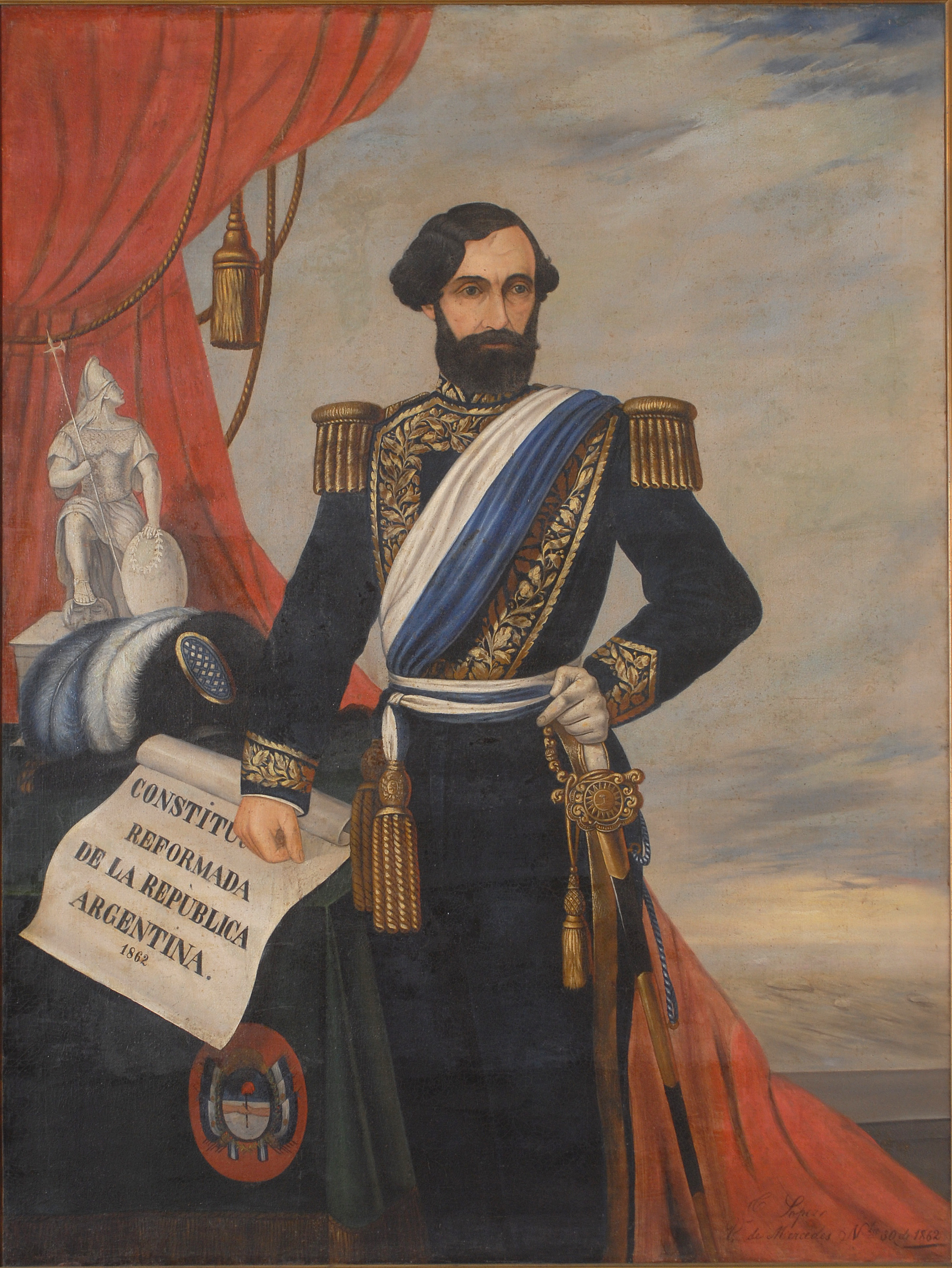
Bartolomé Mitre in full dress uniform with presidential sash. Oil painting by Cándido López exhibited in the Museo Mitre.

=== Overview ===
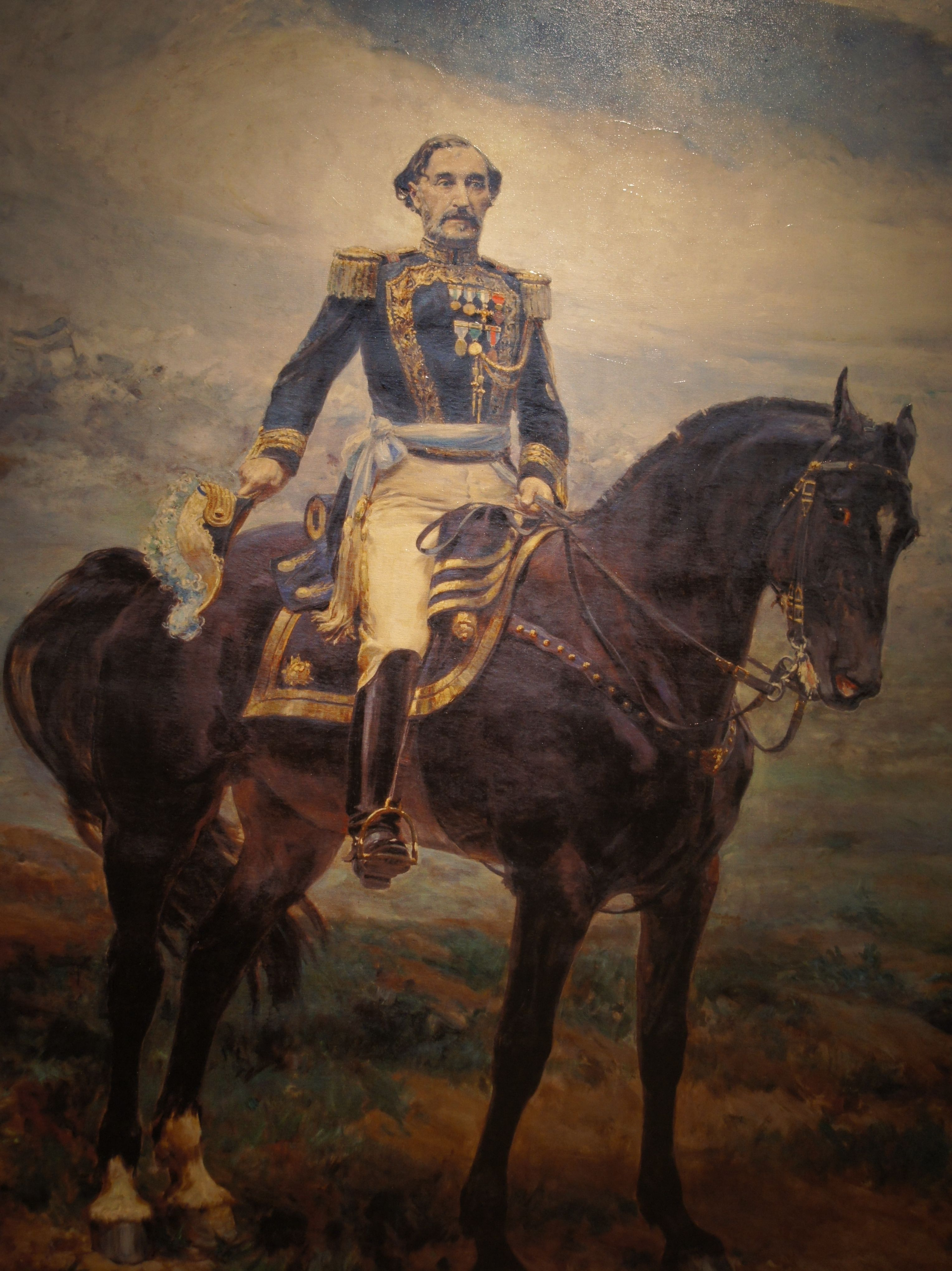
Equestrian portrait of Bartolomé Mitre.

The civil war of 1859, after the revolt of Buenos Aires against Justo José de Urquiza's federal system, resulted in Mitre's defeat by Urquiza at the Battle of Cepeda, in 1860. Issues of customs revenue sharing were settled, and Buenos Aires reentered the Argentine Confederation. Victorious at the 1861 Battle of Pavón, however, Mitre obtained important concessions from the national army, notably the amendment of the Constitution to provide for indirect elections through an electoral college. In October 1862, Mitre was elected president of the republic, and national political unity was finally achieved; a period of internal progress and reform then commenced. During the Paraguayan War, Mitre was initially named the head of the allied forces.

Mitre was also the founder of La Nación, one of South America's leading newspapers, in 1870. His opposition to Autonomist Party nominee Adolfo Alsina, whom he viewed as a veiled Buenos Aires separatist, led Mitre to run for the presidency again, though the seasoned Alsina outmaneuvered him by fielding Nicolás Avellaneda, a moderate lawyer from remote Tucuman Province where the independence of Argentina had been declared in 1816. The electoral college met on 12 April 1874, and awarded Mitre only three provinces, including Buenos Aires.

Mitre visiting the Museum of History, 1901

Mitre took up arms again. Hoping to prevent Avellaneda's 12 October inauguration, he hijacked a gunboat; he was defeated, however, and only President Avellaneda's commutation spared his life. Following the 1890 Revolution of the Park, he broke with the conservative National Autonomist Party (PAN) and co-founded the Civic Union with reformist Leandro Alem. Mitre's desire to maintain an understanding with the ruling PAN led to the Civic Union's schism in 1891, upon which Mitre founded the National Civic Union, and Alem, the Radical Civic Union (the oldest existing party in Argentina).

He dedicated much of his time in later years to writing. According to some of his critics, as a historian Mitre made questionable judgments, often ignoring key documents and events on purpose in his writings. This caused his student Adolfo Saldías to distance himself from him, and for future revisionist historians such as José María Rosa to question the validity of his work altogether. He also wrote poetry and fiction (Soledad: novela original), and translated Dante's La divina commedia (The Divine Comedy) into Spanish. He was the grandfather of the poet Margarita Abella Caprile. Like many other nineteenth century Argentines prominent in public life, he was a freemason.

=== Election and inauguration ===
In August, the elections of presidential electors were held and on 5 October the Electoral College met, unanimously electing Mitre as constitutional president of the Nation. Marcos Paz was elected vice president.

Mitre assumed the presidency on 12 October 1862. Three of the five ministers who accompanied him were from Buenos Aires; the other two were provincials who resided in Buenos Aires, one of them for five years and the other for forty years.

=== Organization of the State ===
The issue of the customs house was resolved with a law of 1863—which favored trade with Europe and lowered taxes on foreign trade— and with the constitutional reform of 1866, which restored the power of the Nation to establish and collect import duties.

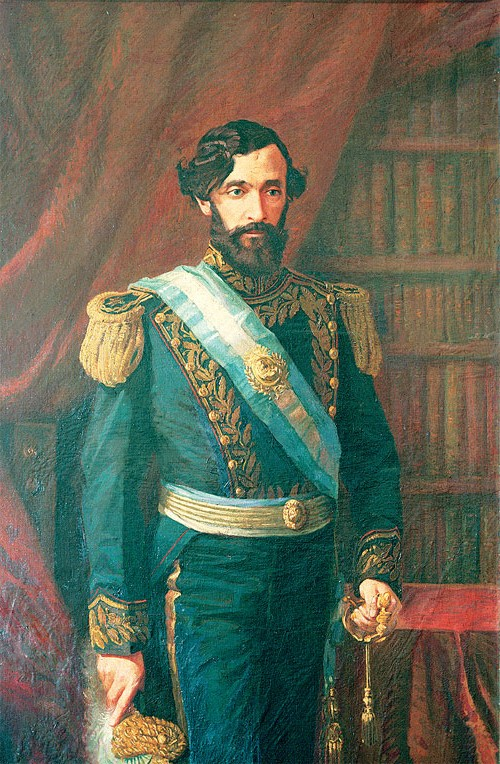
Portrait of Mitre painted by Egidio Querciola, Museo Histórico Nacional.

With Congress and the president installed, it remained to organize the Judiciary, which was governed by a law enacted the day after Mitre assumed office. The Supreme Court of Argentina began operating on 15 January 1863, and in the following months federal courts were organized in all the provinces. The Commercial Code of the State of Buenos Aires was also nationalized.

=== Educational policy ===
Mitre's educational policy was oriented toward the expansion and unification of secondary education, with the idea of spreading liberal ideas among the young people who could access it; national colleges were founded in the provinces of Salta, Tucumán, Mendoza, San Juan and Catamarca, and the Colegio Nacional de Buenos Aires was nationalized.

=== Construction of railways ===
During Mitre's presidency the construction of new railway lines began with the contribution of British capital, such as the Central Argentine Railway—from Rosario to Córdoba—the Buenos Aires Northern Railway, the Buenos Aires and Ensenada Port Railway and the Buenos Aires Great Southern Railway. In the opposite direction, the government of Buenos Aires Province assumed control of the Buenos Aires Western Railway on 1 January 1863, since the Bank of the Province of Buenos Aires was the main creditor.

=== Defeat and death of "Chacho" ===
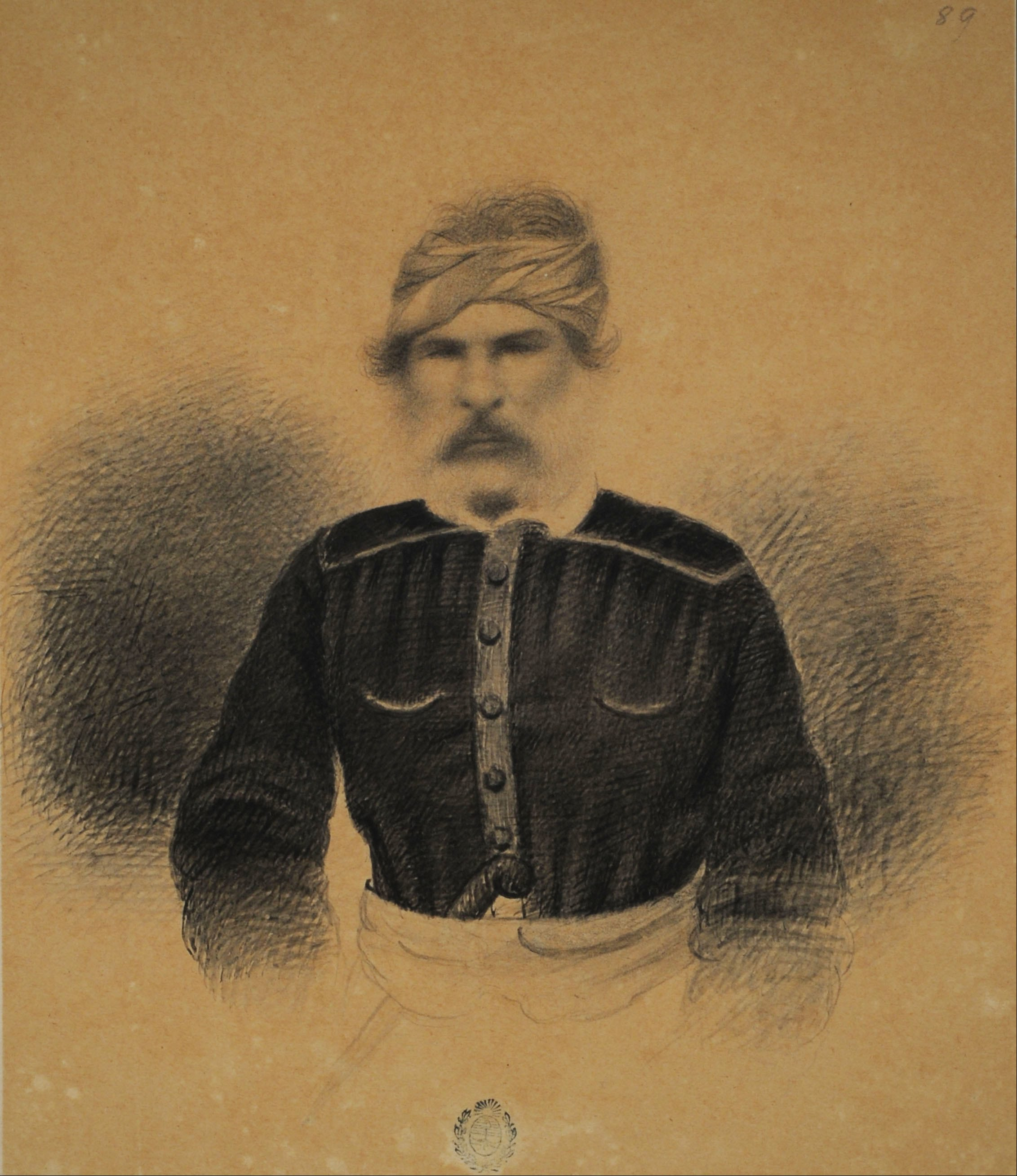
Ángel Vicente "Chacho" Peñaloza.

At the beginning of 1863, "Chacho" Peñaloza retained in his possession the weapons he had used in his previous campaign. Confirming the caudillo's fears, liberal governments, supported by regiments sent from Buenos Aires, persecuted the federals through arrests, looting and executions.

After a series of federal revolts in San Luis and Catamarca, Chacho finally launched another revolution in May 1863:

All the men, having nothing left to lose but their lives, wish to sacrifice them instead on the battlefield.

The response of the Mitrist leaders was rapid and energetic: two armies attacked La Rioja from San Juan and Catamarca, commanded respectively by Sarmiento and Taboada. Mitre announced a new strategy by which his men were authorized to execute prisoners:

I want to wage in La Rioja a police war. By declaring the montoneros to be thieves, without granting them the honor of political partisans, what must be done is very simple.

For several months the war was indecisive, but the federals received unexpected support when Simón Luengo overthrew the governor of Córdoba Province and welcomed Chacho in the provincial capital. On 20 June 1863, federal troops were defeated by Wenceslao Paunero in the Battle of Las Playas.

Peñaloza returned to La Rioja, from where he attacked Caucete, very close to the city of San Juan. There he was defeated by commander Pablo Irrazábal and had to flee again toward his province, where José Miguel Arredondo destroyed the last remnants of his army. Taking refuge in the town of Olta, on 12 November, he surrendered and was murdered by Irrazábal, who had his head cut off as a warning to the federals. Sarmiento commented:

I applauded the measure precisely for the way it was carried out.

In January of the following year, the montoneros of San Luis were defeated, and by mid-1865, the last minor caudillos in La Rioja had been defeated.

=== Foreign relations ===
Regarding the United States, where the previous ambassador in Washington, D.C. had died, (Note: The Argentine ambassador to the United States was Carlos María de Alvear, the former Supreme Director of the United Provinces of the Río de la Plata.) Mitre took months to appoint Sarmiento there, who arrived more than three years after Mitre had assumed power.

In relation to Spain, he rejected the treaty signed by Alberdi in 1859, obtaining modification of the article concerning the citizenship of children of Spaniards.

Mitre's position regarding Latin American countries was one of complete indifference: when his government was invited to participate in the Pan-American Congress of 1862, held in Lima in response to the Second French intervention in Mexico and the Spanish annexation of the Dominican Republic, Mitre refused to appoint an official representative. The reply of Foreign Minister Rufino de Elizalde to the invitation to defend themselves collectively against European advances was that:

Independent America is a political entity that does not exist and cannot be constituted through diplomatic combinations. America, containing independent nations with their own needs and forms of government, can never form a single political entity (...) As for the Argentine Republic, it has never feared any threat from Europe as a whole, nor from any of the nations that compose it (...) It can be said that the Republic is identified with Europe as much as possible.

== Death and legacy ==
Bartolomé Mitre died in 1906, affected by a gastrointestinal illness. The charismatic leader was mourned by a crowd rarely seen until then, who accompanied the funeral procession from his home to La Recoleta Cemetery.

Bartolomé Mitre was the paradigm of the Argentine statesman of the 19th century. Mitre thematically returns to the ideals of May Revolution and lists the principles of the Freedom Party, the first Argentine party that consciously launches itself into political struggle with a liberal program. The program of the Freedom Party is the faithful synthesis of the democratic progressivism that Esteban Echeverría longed for to overcome the sterile antagonism of unitarians and federalists.

As an intellectual, he wrote poetry, theater, countless newspaper articles, cemented historical science with his exemplary biographies, translated classic works, and authored fiery harangues. Mitre was a leading figure in politics and culture until his death in 1906.

Mitre supported the establishment of universal direct suffrage, which was ultimately established in 1912, during the presidency of Roque Sáenz Peña.

When he assumed the presidency in 1862, the conditions in which the republic was found were precarious. The treasury was exhausted, the debts were large, the three national powers needed to be organized, buildings to house them separately from the provincial authorities had to be established, the question of the residence of the national authorities in the city of Buenos Aires had to be solved, the army and updated salaries had to be established, the minimum structures of the national public administration were created, and the basic program of their generation was promoted: education, immigration, foreign investment, railways, and land occupation. An appreciation of Mitre's government work that ignores his point of origin will not do him enough justice.

Referring to Mitre's financial rectitude, the explorer Sir Richard Burton wrote:

He has been Provisional Governor, Provisional President, and since 1862 actual President and Commander-in-chief, yet his friends lately subscribed to buy for him a house – surely this is high praise, here and elsewhere.

Wrote Robert Avrett:

[Mitre] included in his career enough action to fill the lives of a dozen ordinary men, despite the fact that his health was never robust... He was soldier, statesman, political propagandist, first president of the Argentine Republic, orator, historian, journalist, newspaper editor and publisher, as well as poet, translator, and critic; and at each of these roles he worked with a seemingly tireless energy.

== Bibliography ==
Mitre ranks as an important South-American historiographer. He wrote the best accounts of South America's wars of independence and published many works, amongst which are:

- Historia de Belgrano y de la independencia argentina ["History of Belgrano and of the argentine independence"] (1857; fifth edition, four volumes, 1902)
- Historia de San Martín y de la emancipación sudamericana ["History of San Martín"] (1869; third edition, six volumes, 1907)
- Rimas ["Rimes"] (new edition, 1890)
- Ulrich Schmidel, primer historiador del Rio de la Plata ["Ulrich Schmidel, first historian of the Rio de la Plata"] (1890)

There is an abridged translation of the Historia de San Martín, entitled The Emancipation of South America (London, 1893) by W. Pilling. Mitre's speeches were collected as Arengas (third edition, three volumes, 1902).

== Gallery ==
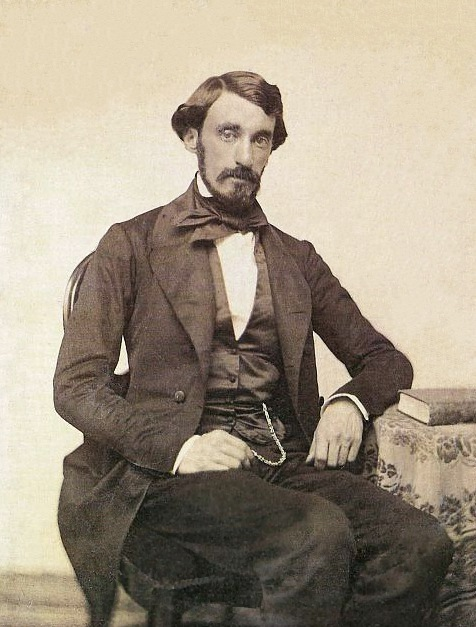
Bartolomé Mitre at age 33, 1854

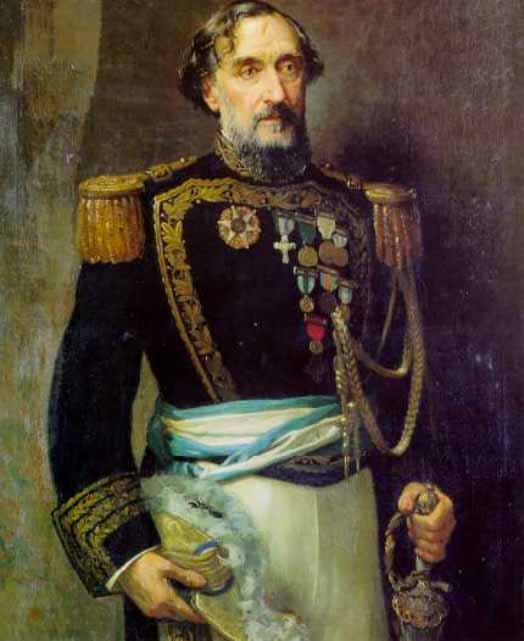
Mitre's presidential portrait, 1861

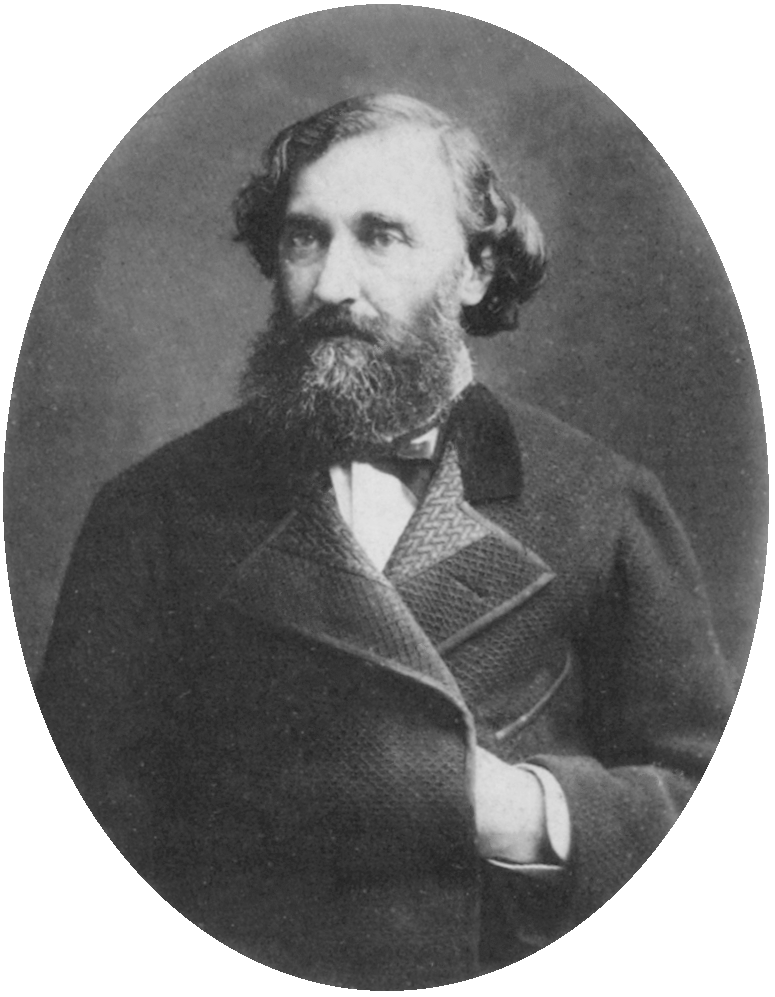
Mitre, perhaps around age 49, 1870

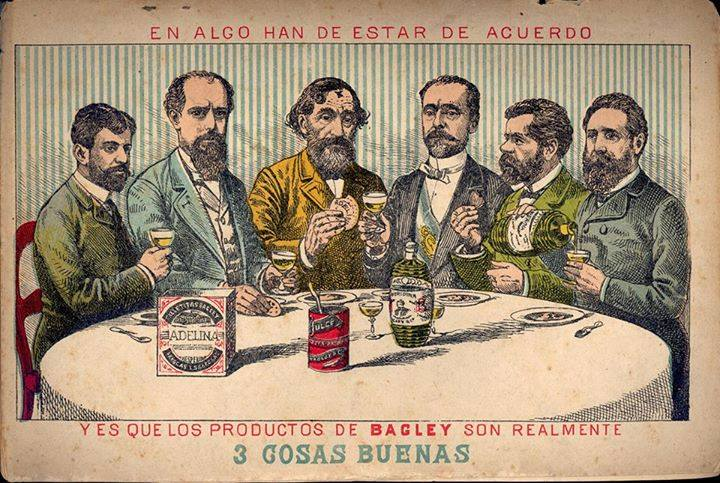
1889 ad with caricatures of Mitre and other politicians

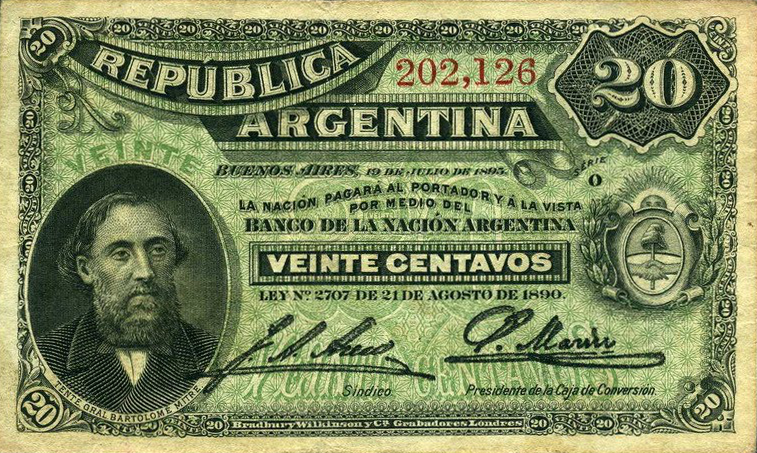
Mitre's portrait on an 1895 bill

== Bibliography ==
- Biedma, J. J. (1902). Mitre, Bartolomé (ed.). El Teniente General Bartolomé Mitre [Lieutenant General Bartolomé Mitre] (in Spanish). Vol. III. Buenos Aires.
- Katra, William H. (1996). The Argentine Generation of 1837: Echeverría, Alberdi, Sarmiento, Mitre. Madison, NJ: Fairleigh Dickinson University Press.

Political offices
Preceded by Juan E. Pedernera	President of Argentina; 1862–1868	Succeeded by Domingo F. Sarmiento
