= Rakawskaye pradmyestse =

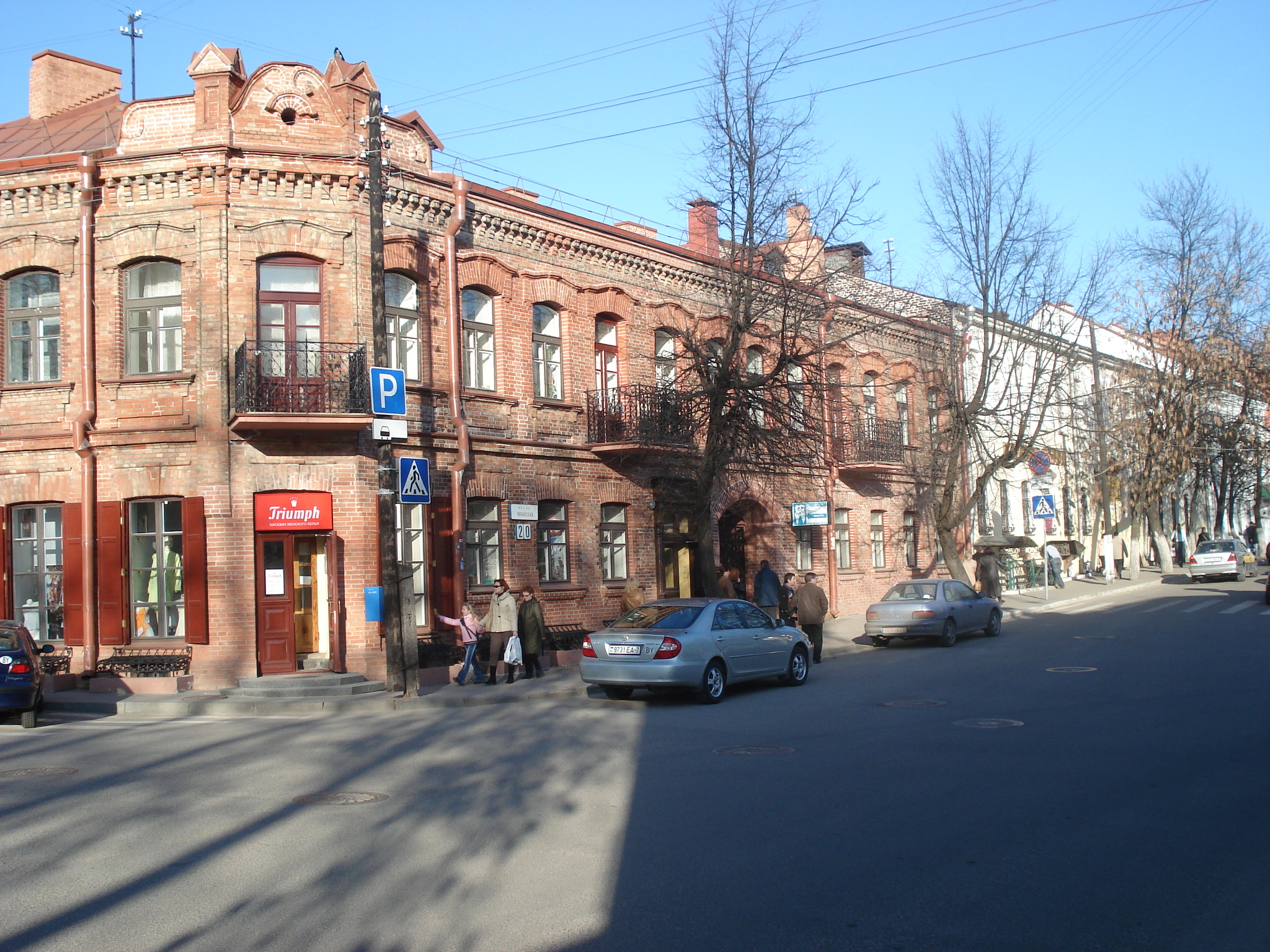
Rakaŭskaja Street

Rakaŭskaje pradmieście (Belarusian: Ракаўскае прадмесьце) is a historic district of Minsk, Belarus, located along the ancient road to Rakaŭ. The Uniate Church, Carmelite monastery and the Church of St. Mary Magdalene, Orthodox monastery and the Church of the Holy Apostles Peter and Paul are located here. During the Nazi occupation, the district was part of the Minsk Ghetto.

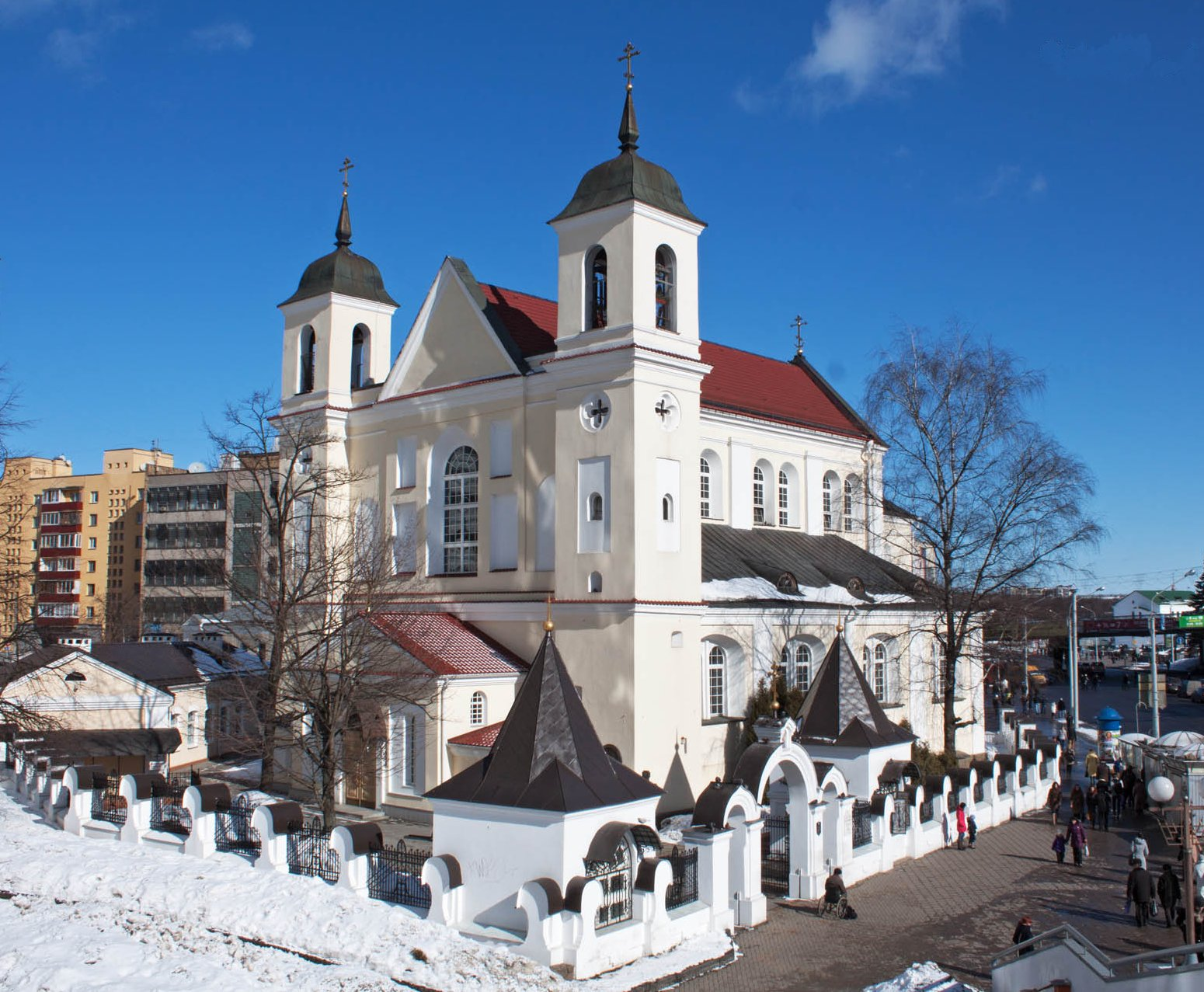
Church of the Holy Apostles Peter and Paul

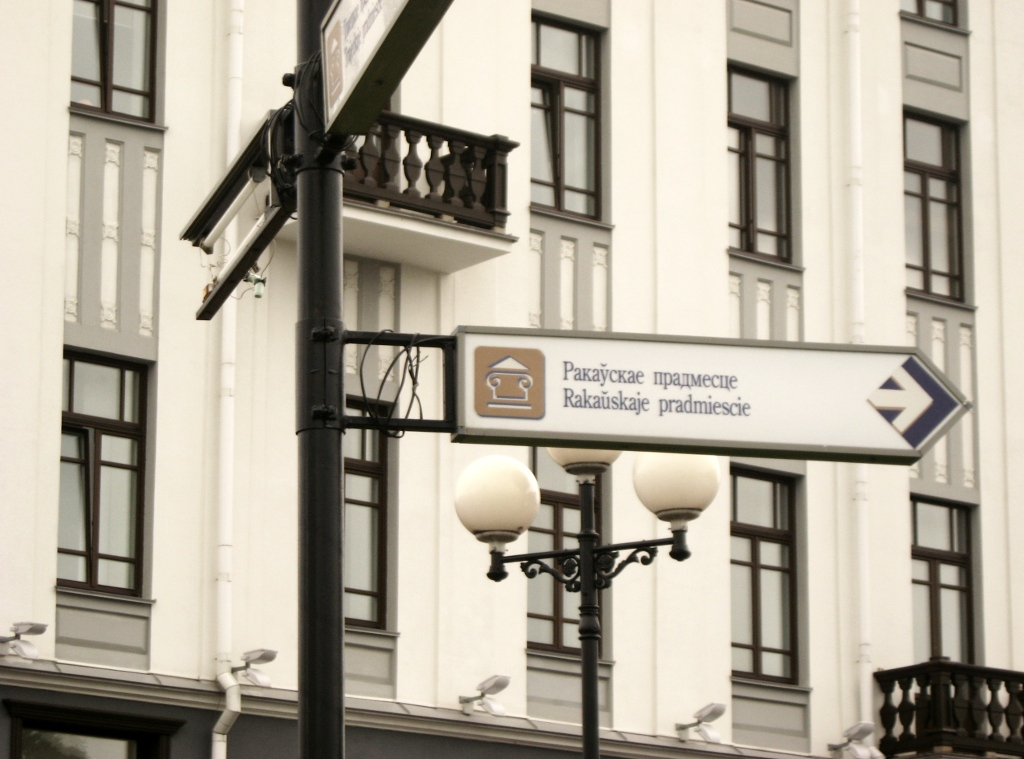
Rakaŭskaje pradmiescie sign direction in Belarusian and English

To the west of Rakaŭskaje pradmiescie is Ramanaŭskaja Slabada, in the north - Tatarskaja Slabada (Piatnickaje pradmiescie), in the east - Zamčyšča, in the south - Nizki Rynak.
