= Zair Azgur =

Soviet Belarusian sculptor

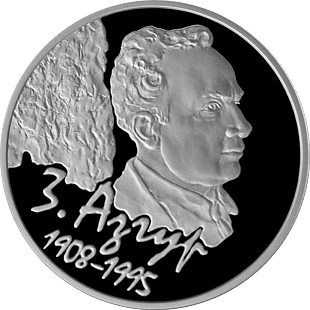

Zair Isaakovich Azgur (January 15, 1908 – February 18, 1995) was a Soviet and Belarusian sculptor active during the Soviet period. Born in Mogilev Governorate (now in Vitebsk Region, Belarus), he studied in that city from 1922 to 1925; from 1925 until 1928 he studied at the Vkhutein in Leningrad. He first exhibited in 1923. He was mainly active in Minsk, where among his projects was the creation of reliefs for the opera house. He created a series of portrait busts of war heroes and military figures during the 1940s. At the 1958 World's Fair in Brussels he won a silver medal for his statue of Rabindranath Tagore. Monuments to his design were erected at Luhansk in 1947; Minsk in 1947; Borodino in 1949; Suzdal in 1950; and Leninogorsk - a monument to Vladimir Lenin - in 1957. Later in his career he exhibited in Bucharest and Paris.

Azgur's home and studio in Minsk is now a museum.

Azgur is the uncle of Jewish Belarusian partisan Masha Bruskina, publicly hanged by the Nazis in October 1941 in Minsk. Soon after the war, he immediately recognized Masha in the dreadful photographs exposed as he was visiting the Belarusian State Museum of the History of the Great Patriotic War. First claiming her identity, but then he retraced his steps.

== Honours and awards ==
- Hero of Socialist Labour
- Two Orders of Lenin
- Order of the October Revolution
- Two Orders of the Red Banner of Labour
- Order of the Red Star
- Order of Friendship of Peoples
- Medal "For the Victory over Germany in the Great Patriotic War 1941–1945"
- Medal "For Valiant Labour in the Great Patriotic War 1941–1945"
- Medal "To a Partisan of the Patriotic War" 1st class
- Medal "Veteran of Labour"
- Two Stalin Prizes
- Title of People's Artist of the USSR (visual arts)
