= Commemorative banknotes of the Sri Lankan rupee =

Significant events of national importance have been occasions for the issue of commemorative notes in Sri Lanka. The Central Bank of Sri Lanka has issued two commemorative notes. In 1998 a 200 rupees note was issued on Independence day to commemorate the 50th Independence Anniversary of the country. The note was issued along with three commemorative coins; a five thousand rupees gold coin, a one thousand rupees silver coin, and a ten rupees bi-metallic coin. The 200 rupees commemorative note was the first time a Sri Lankan note had been issued in polymer plastic produced by Note Printing Australia. The artwork was done by Ananda Somathilake and Gamini Mendis. Only a limited number of notes were issued. The note is being removed from circulation, and is rarely seen. Currently about 3% of the ~20.5 million notes issued are in circulation or with collectors.

In 2009 the 1000 rupees note commemorating the end of the Sri Lankan Civil War and the Ushering of Peace and Prosperity note was issued. The note is dated two days after the end of the war as 2009-05-20. The note is the first time since 1954, that an image of a living person has been used on Sri Lankan currency notes. It is a paper note, with a limited number issued.

== List of notes ==
Note	Image	Commemorative subject	Obverse Description	Reverse Description	Colour	Material	Dimensions (mm)	No. printed	Year issued	Watermark	Ref
200 rupee (1998)		50th Independence Anniversary	Independence Memorial Hall; A collage of development projects (New Parliament Complex, Mahaweli Development programme, Gal Oya Development programme, Bandaranaike International Airport and BMICH) (Note: Progress during 50 years of Independence)	Sri Dalada Maligawa and the Pattirippuwa; A panel illustrating key historical events/sites (Advent of Prince Vijaya, Arrival of Ven. Mahinda, Dutugamunu uniting Sri Lanka, Sigiriya, Parakramabahu I, Ven. Wariyapola Sri Sumangala pulling down the Union Jack) (Note: The National Heritage)	Blue	Polymer	146.5 x 73	20.559 million (20,559,000)	1998	A lion holding a sword	
1000 rupee (2009)		The Ushering of Peace and Prosperity	Portrait of Mahinda Rajapaksa; Map of Sri Lanka with the rising sun; The "Punkalasa" with ears of paddy	Hoisting the Flag of Sri Lanka; Military Assets; Mavil Aru dam and Thoppigala rock	Blue	Paper	157 x 78.5	25 million (25,000,000)	2009	A lion holding a sword	
500 rupee (2013)		Commonwealth Heads of Government Meeting 2013 held in Sri Lanka	World Trade Center and BOC Headquarters; Lankathilaka Viharaya; Sri Lanka emerald-collared parakeet (Psittacula calthropae); CHOGM 2013 logo	Thelme dancer and Yak Bera drummer; "Padmanidhi" guard stone; Stylized "Dvithva Liya Vela" floral motif; Map of Sri Lanka	Purple	Paper	143 x 67	5 million (5,000,000)	2013	Emerald-collared parakeet	
1000 rupee (2018)		70th Anniversary of Independence	70th Anniversary of Independence logo; A Vihara, a Church, a Kovil and a Mosque; Sri Lanka hanging parrot (Loriculus beryllinus)	Malpadaya Netuma dancer and Dawul Bera drummer; "Rathnaprasadaya" guard stone; Stylized "Dvithva Liya Vela" floral motif; Map of Sri Lanka	Green	Paper	148 x 67	5 million (5,000,000)	2018	Sri Lanka Hanging Parrot	
2000 rupee (2025)		75th Anniversary of the Central Bank of Sri Lanka	CBSL Head Office Building; CBSL 75th Anniversary logo; Stylized Colombo Skyline; Colombo Lighthouse Clock Tower	Stylized Map of Sri Lanka; Blue Water Lily (Nymphaea nouchali)	Blue	Paper	151 x 67	50 million (50,000,000)	2025	A lion holding a sword	

== See also ==
- Sri Lankan commemorative coins
