= Museo Mitre =

History museum in Buenos Aires, Argentina

Coordinates: 34.604106°S 58.373969°W

Mitre Museum
- Museo Mitre
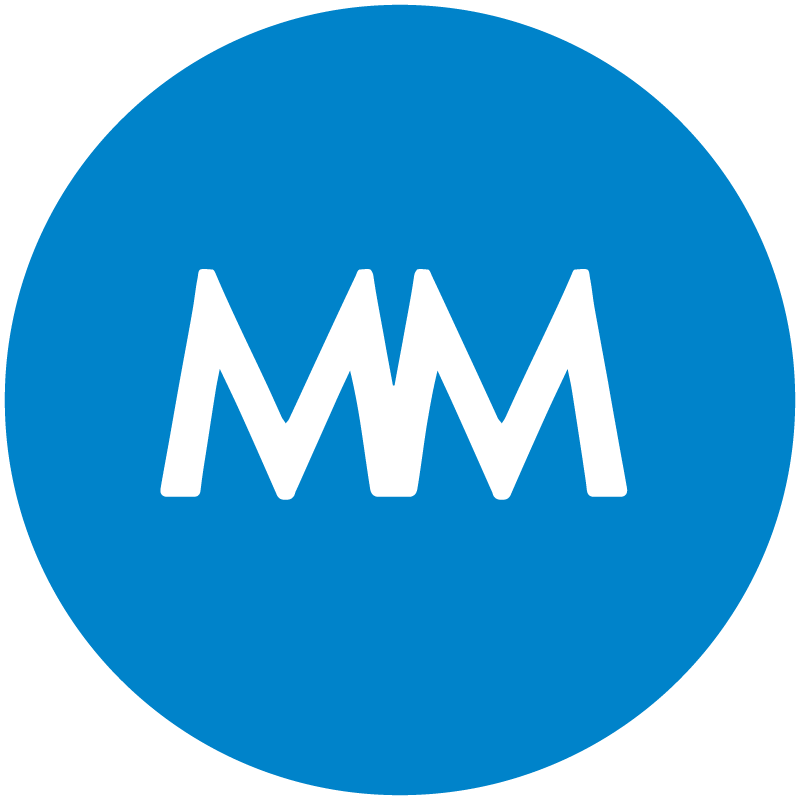

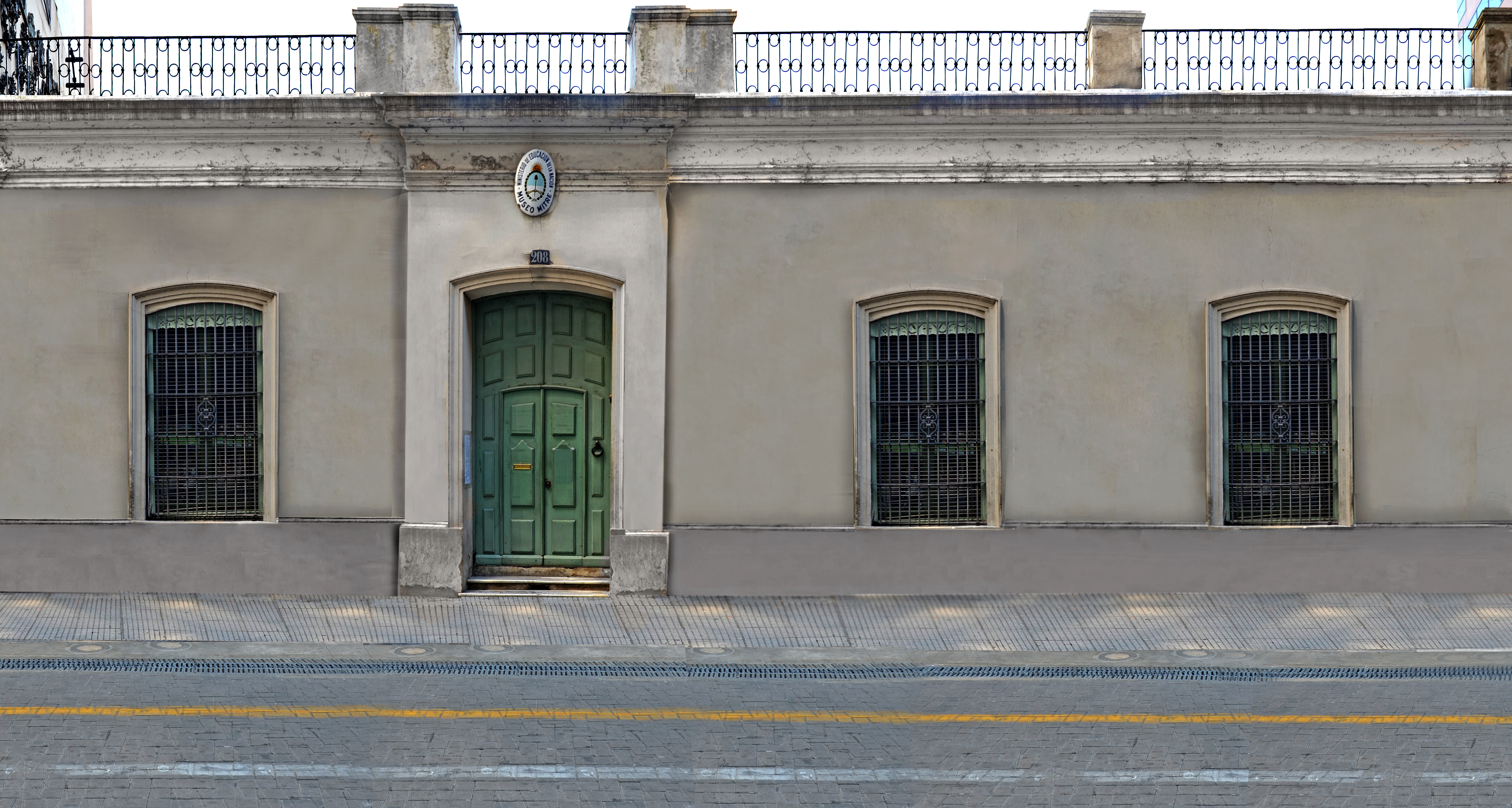
- Main facade of the house
- Established: June 1907; 119 years ago
- Location: Buenos Aires, Argentina
- Collection size: 153,000
- Directors: Marcelo Garabedian (Feb 2024–present)
- Owner: Government of Argentina
- Website: museomitre.cultura.gob.ar

National Historic Monument of Argentina
- Designated: May 21, 1942

The Mitre Museum (Spanish: Museo Mitre) in Buenos Aires, Argentina, is a museum dedicated to Argentine history, as well as to the legacy of former President of Argentina, Bartolomé Mitre. The museum building is a Spanish colonial house built in 1785. It first appears in Argentine history as the refuge of the last Viceroy of Río de la Plata, Baltasar Hidalgo de Cisneros, following the May Revolution of 1810. In 1860 the house was rented by General Bartolomé Mitre in 1860, and was his residence during his tenure as the 6th President of Argentina between 1862 and 1868.

In 1868 the house was purchased and donated to Mitre by a group of local citizens in recognition of his term as president, as well as for his contributions to national unity; he lived there until his death in 1906. La Nación, one of the nation's oldest and most influential dailies, was published here from its establishment in 1870, until 1895.

== Overview ==
The house was purchased by the National Government via Law 4,943, in June of that year, and on June 3, 1907, the Mitre Museum opened its doors to the public. The museum's first director, Alejandro Rosa, had founded the Western Hemisphere Historic and Numismatic Society with Mitre in 1893, and following the classification of Mitre's extensive ethnolinguistic library, numismatic and other collections, the society was located in the museum from 1918 until 1971 (it was rechartered as the National Academy of History of Argentina in 1938).

The historic archive of the museum is among the largest archives in Argentina due to its historic relevance, with about 53,200 files. Most of them were part of the Bartolomé Mitre's private collection. The library has about 100,000 items including books, magazines, CDs, DVDs, and microfilms.

The museum was declared a National Historic Monument on May 21, 1942, and is maintained by the National Secretariat of Culture. The museum can be seen on some Argentine two peso bills.
