= Tatarskaya Slabada =

Historical settlement of Minsk

Tatarskaya Slabada Татарская Слабада
- Sloboda
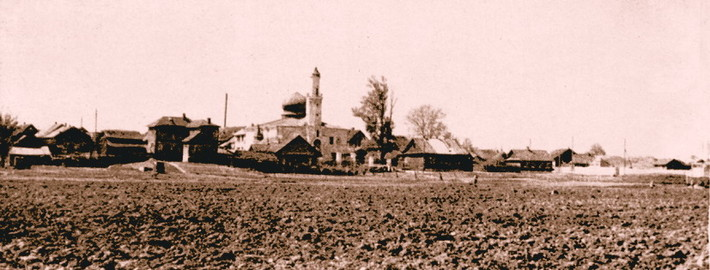
- A photograph of the settlement in 1947
- Interactive map of Tatarskaya Slabada
- Country: Belarus
- City: Minsk
- Present day district: Trinity Suburb
- First recorded: 1428

Tatarskaya Slabada (Belarusian: Татарская Слабада, romanized: Tatarskaja Slabada; Russian: Татарская Слобода, romanized: Tatarskaya Sloboda) is a historical settlement in Minsk, west and northwest of the old city centre.

== Geography ==
It is located on the low left bank of Svislach and was settled by Lipka Tatars from the 15th century (first settlement recorded in 1428) to mid-20th century. It consisted of mainly wooden 1- and 2-storey wooden houses surrounded by lush gardens (local Tatars historically were main suppliers of vegetables and fruit for local markets). The only tall building of the area was a local mosque (Minski Myachet; Belarusian: Мiнская мячэць).

== History ==
Tatarskaya Slabada was devastated during the World War II. During Minsk's postwar reconstruction, a large part of the settlement (including the mosque) was destroyed to provide land for Parkavaya Mahistral avenue (later Praspekt Masherava, currently Praspekt Peramozhtsaǔ). Now the area is constructed of high-rise office and residential buildings from the 1960s-1980s. The traditional residents (Lipka Tatars) have been dispersed across the city and no longer have a cultural settlement area.
