= National Opera and Ballet of Belarus =

Theatre in Minsk, Belarus

Coordinates: 53°54′37″N 27°33′41″E

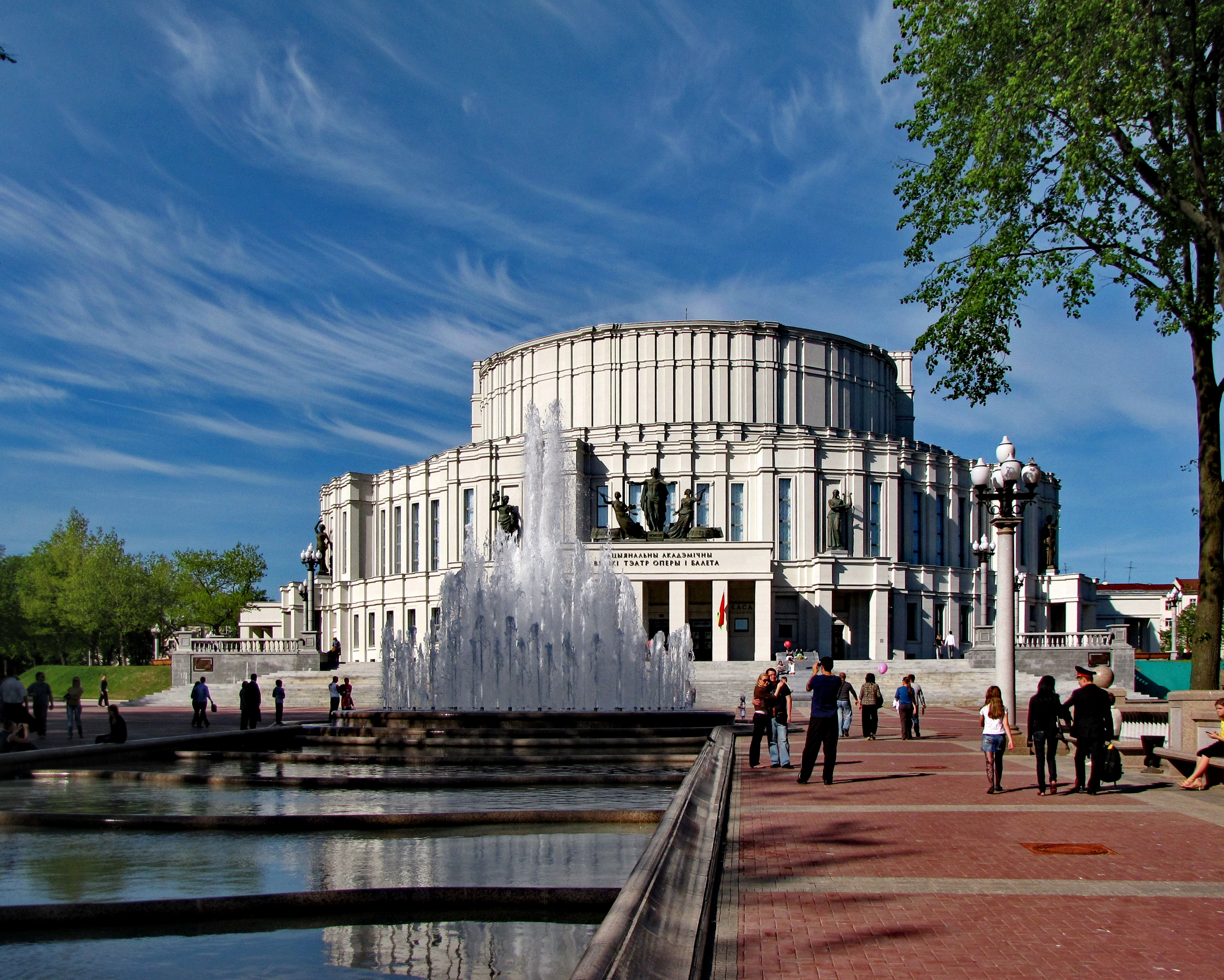
The Opera and Ballet Theatre in Minsk

The National Academic Grand Opera and Ballet Theatre of the Republic of Belarus (Belarusian: Нацыянальны акадэмічны Вялікі тэатр оперы і балета, romanized: Nacyjanalny akademičny Bialiki teatr opery i baleta, Russian: Национальный академический Большой театр оперы и балета, romanized: Natsionalny akademichesky Bolshoy teatr opery i baleta) is located in a park in the Trinity Hill district of Minsk. Local people call it the "Opierny Teatr" (Belarusian) or the "Opera and Ballet Theatre". While the theatre opened on 15 May 1933, in the beginning, it did not have its own performance venue. Until 1938, the troupe performed at the Belarusian Drama Theatre building.

== History ==
The first permanent theatre was founded in Belarus in 1933 based on the Belarusian Opera and ballet school; the founder of the studio was a famous Russian Opera singer Anton Bonachich (Belarusian: Anton Bonatschitsch) (ru: Антон Петрович Боначич). Shortly after, Bonachich died in 1933.

The current theatre's building was opened in 1939. It was designed by the Belarusian architect from Leningrad, Iosif Langbard, whose original design was only partially implemented; some design details were omitted for financial reasons. The theatre has reliefs done by Zair Azgur.

Bizet's Carmen opened the theatre on 25 May 1933 with the title role being sung by Larisa Aleksandrovskaya. Several professional soloists and dancers were added to the troupe in the first few years at this location. Swan Lake, performed by K. Muller, was the first show on the stage of the new theatre. By 1940, Grand was added to the theatre's name to indicate its expansion. The performances by the theatre company during the "Decade of Belarusian Art" in Moscow in June 1940 was a great success which included the first Belarusian ballet, The Nightingale composed by Mikhail Kroshner, as well as other national operas such as "In the Dense Forest of Palesse", "The Flower of Fortune", and the second version of "Mikhas Podgorny". Performances continued during the war in Nizhny Novgorod, then known as Gorky until the liberation of Minsk in 1944; after that performances took place in Kovrov.

Enrichment of post World War 2 repertoire and expansion

During this time the repertoire was greatly enriched. The most famous operas staged in this theatre include Boris Godunov by Modest Mussorgsky, Otello and Don Carlo by Giuseppe Verdi, Jacques Offenbach's The Tales of Hoffmann, Sadko and The Golden Cockerel by Nikolai Rimsky-Korsakov, and Lohengrin by Richard Wagner. Socialist realist operas by Belarusian composers such as Yuri Semenyako, Yevgeny Glebov (Your Spring, 1963) and Heinrich Wagner were included.

Among the most notable composers has been Kulikovich Shcheglov, who like some of the writers went into exile after the war. Others include Yevgeny Glebov, composer of the opera Your Spring (1963) and the ballet Alpine Ballad (1967), ..." In 1967, the theatre was awarded the title of Academic for its status in the progression of the performing arts.

In 1996 the State Theater was divided into two independent theatres: the National Academic Grand Ballet Theatre of the Republic of Belarus and the National Academic Opera Theatre of Belarus, but in 2008 they once again combined to become the present name, National Academic Grand Opera and Ballet Theatre of the Republic of Belarus.

The building was renovated and it reopened in 2009. Many sculptures were added around the theatre, its stage was slightly moved and audience space expanded. The most up-to-date lighting and motion equipment were added while adhering to the original design. The ballet company is considered one of the foremost companies in the world.

== The theatre today ==
Works by Belarus composers in the company's repertoire today include Dmitry Smolsky's The Grey Legend (Russian «Седая легенда» 1978).
