= Trinity Suburb =

Historical district of Minsk

Coordinates: 53.908535°N 27.555985°E

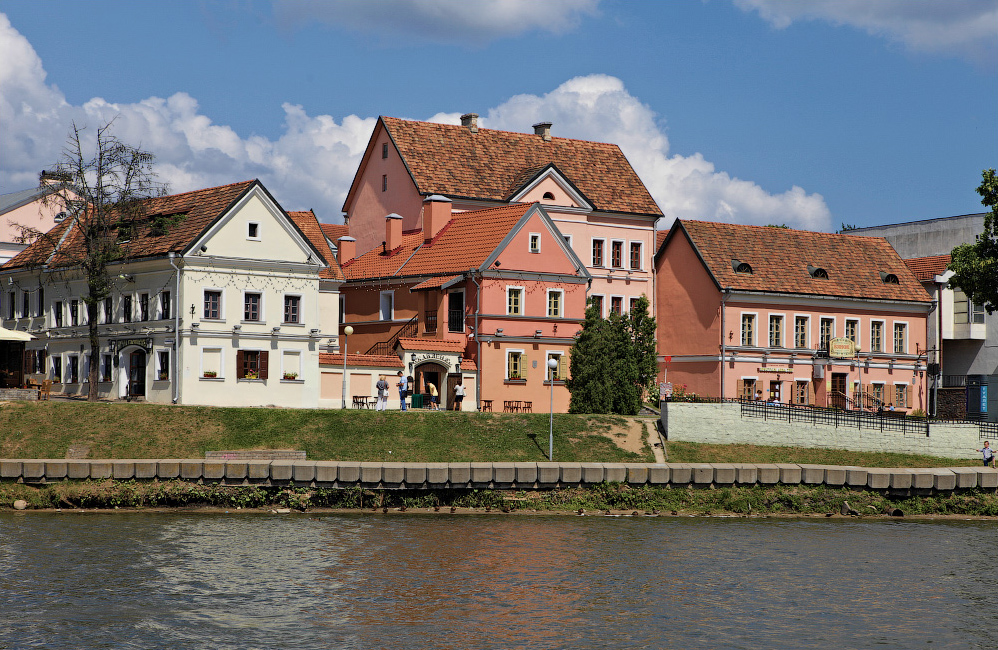
Trinity Suburb from river side

The Trinity Suburb (Belarusian: Траецкае прадмесьце, romanized: Trajeckaje pradmiescie, Russian: Троицкое предместье, romanized: Troitskoye predmestye, Trinity Hill) is a historical district of Minsk located in the north-eastern part of the historical centre on the left bank of the Svislach river. It was the trade and administrative centre of the capital of Belarus in the past. In the northwest of the Trinity Suburb there is Tatarskaya Slabada, settled by Lipka Tatars from the 15th century (first settlement recorded in 1428) to mid-20th century, and Starastinskaya Slaboda, in the north – Storozhevka, in the east – Zolotaya Gorka, in the south – the central regions of the High and Low Markets.

The first Catholic church in Minsk was located on the territory of the suburb. There were also the Ascension Monastery with the church of the same name, which have not survived to this day, St. Boris and Gleb Church, the Basilian Convent of the Holy Trinity (partially preserved) and the Church and Monastery of the Catholic monastic order. Nowadays the suburb is one of the most favorite places of Minsk residents and guests of the capital.

Modern buildings of the district include the National Opera and Ballet Theatre, the Island of Tears, memorial that commemorates the Soviet soldiers died in the Afghanistan war in the 1970s.

The Trinity Suburb on a specimen of the 5-ruble banknote, 2000 design.

There are several hypotheses about the origin of the toponym "Trinity Hill". Most likely, the placename comes from the Catholic church of the Trinity, founded by Jogaila in 1390. According to another version, the toponym comes from the name of the defensive redoubt of the Holy Trinity, which was located near the Borisov outpost. The suburb is depicted on the obverse of the 5-ruble banknote of the 2000 series.

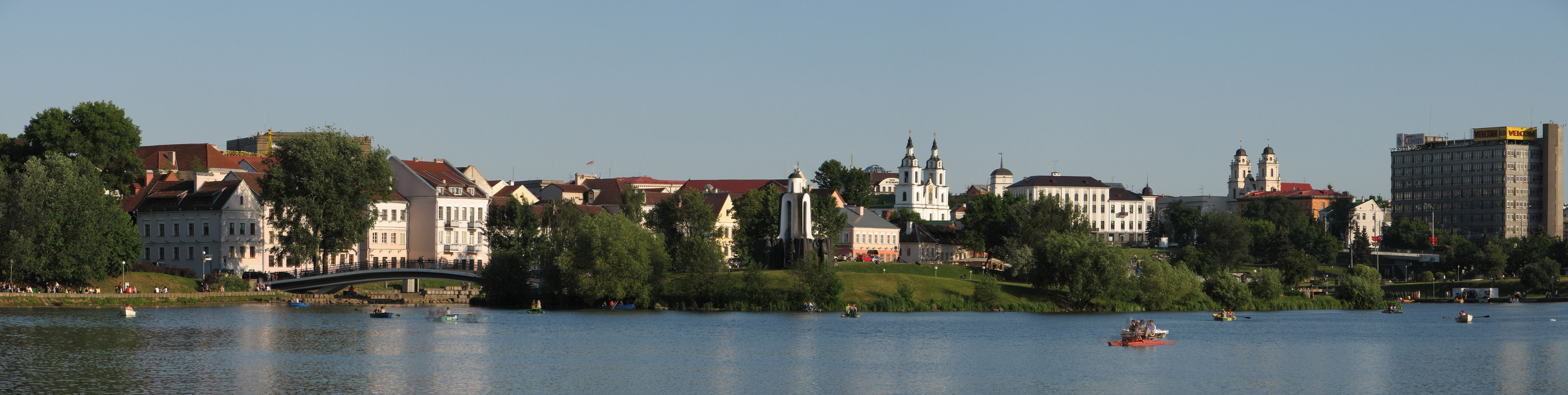
