= Football Federation of the 3rd Department Cordillera =

- Federación de Fútbol Tercer Departamento Cordillera
- Type: Sports governing body
- Legal status: Active
- Purpose: Football governing body
- Location: Caacupé
- Coordinates: 25°23′S 57°08′W
- Region served: Cordillera, Paraguay
- Website: ufi.org.py

Football Federation of the 3rd Department Cordillera (Federación de Fútbol Tercer Departamento Cordillera) is the departamental governing body of football (soccer) in the department of Cordillera, in Paraguay. The federation is responsible for the organization of football leagues in the different cities of the department and it is also the regulator of the clubs. The main office of this federation is located in the city of Caacupé.

Tournaments for each league of this federation are played every year to determine the best teams. Afterwards, the champions of each league face each other to determine the best team in the department, with the overall winner being promoted to a higher division in the Paraguayan football league system.

== Leagues in Cordillera ==
=== Liga Alteña de Fútbol ===
The Liga Alteña de Fútbol is based in the city of Altos. The following teams are part of this league:

- Porvenir Alteño
- 12 de Junio
- 8 de Setiembre
- Libertad
- 24 de Mayo
- Independiente
- Sol de Mayo FBC
- 14 de Mayo
- Sportivo Acosta Ñú
- General Aquino
- Juventud Unido
- 1 de Marzo
- Guaraní
- Juventud Guaraní
- 1 de Mayo
- Sportivo Ytagasa
- General Bernardino Caballero

=== Liga Arroyense de Fútbol ===
The Liga Arroyense de Fútbol is based in the city of Arroyos y Esteros. The following teams are part of this league:

- A.S. Manduvirá
- Paraguayos Unidos
- General Díaz
- 13 de Junio
- Guaraní
- Cerro Porteño
- 8 de Diciembre
- 12 de Junio FBC
- Primavera
- Sportivo Curupayty
- Cabo Luciano Locio
- San Luis FBC
- Olimpia
- Mariscal López
- Cerro Corá
- 27 de Noviembre
- 12 de Octubre
- Tte. Porfirio Saldivar
- General B. Caballero FBC
- Nacional
- 26 de Julio
- Cabo Jose V. Recalde

=== Liga Atyreña de Deportes ===
The Liga Atyreña de Deportes is based in the city of Atyrá. The following teams are part of this league:

- 4 de Octubre
- Sportivo Atyreño
- 3 de Febrero
- Tte. A. Rojas Silva
- Coronel Ojeda
- 6 de Enero
- Humaitá FBC
- 5 de Abril
- Nacional
- Olimpia
- Cerro Porteño
- Cerro Corá
- 29 de Setiembre
- 16 de Agosto
- 13 de Junio
- Sportivo Primavera
- Alianza Central
- Capitan Vallejos
- 3 de Mayo
- 12 de Agosto
- Guaraní FBC
- Maracaná
- 24 de Junio

=== Liga Barrereña de Deportes ===
The Liga Barrereña de Deportes is based in the city of Eusebio Ayala. The following teams are part of this league:

- Acosta Ñú
- Sportivo Barrereña
- Sportivo Aguaity
- Capitan Garcia Rivardi
- Cerro Corá
- Flor de Mayo
- General Diaz
- General Caballero
- Libertad
- Cnel. Gómez
- Sportivo Rubio Ñú
- 6 de Enero
- Curupaity
- 24 de Mayo
- Tte. A. Rojas Silva
- Union Pacifico
- Presidente Franco
- 3 de Febrero
- 24 de Junio

=== Liga Caacupeña de Deportes ===
The Liga Caacupeña de Deportes is based in the city of Caacupé. The following teams are part of this league:

- 15 de Agosto
- 20 de Julio
- 1 de Enero
- 12 de Octubre
- Acosta Ñú
- 25 de Setiembre
- 12 de Junio
- Sportivo Guarani
- Tte. Jose M. Fariña
- Sportivo Barrio Loma
- Sportivo Caacupemi
- Tte. Jose Auino
- Juventud Cordillerana
- Sportivo Costa Alegre
- Atletico River Plate
- 4 de Octubre
- 6 de Enero
- Mariscal Lopez
- Sol de Mayo
- Union Paraguaya
- 3 de Mayo
- General Diaz
- Cerro Cora
- Atletico Vista Alegre
- Aquidaban
- Cerro Cora
- Cerro Corona
- 24 de Mayo
- Boca Juniors
- 13 de Junio
- Libertad
- Sportivo Guaraní
- 13 Tuyutí
- 14 de Mayo
- 8 de Diciembre
- Juventud Cordillerana
- 15 de Mayo
- Sportivo Almadeño

=== Liga Caraguatay de Deportes ===
The Liga Caraguatay de Deportes is based in the city of Caraguatay. The following teams are part of this league:

- Sportivo Caraguatay
- Sportivo Alfonso Loma
- Norte América FBC
- Comandante Lara
- Cordillerano Central
- Atlético Independiente
- Jovenes Unidos
- Mcal. Lopez
- 27 de Diciembre
- 3 de Febrero
- 6 de Julio
- 12 de Junio FBC
- 24 de Junio
- Guaraní

=== Liga Deportiva Cerro Corá ===
The Liga Deportiva Cerro Corá is based in the city of 1 de Marzo. The following teams are part of this league:

- Unión Obrera
- Sportivo 1 de Marzo
- Boquerón
- Juventud Unida
- Sol de América
- Nueva Estrella
- General Díaz FBC
- Tte. A. Rojas Silva
- Nacional FBC
- Sportivo Yhaguy

=== Liga Cordillerana de Deportes ===
The Liga Cordillerana de Deportes is based in the city of Isla Pucú. The following teams are part of this league:

- Sportivo Isla Pucú
- Mcal. Lopez
- Cerro Cora
- Costa Rica
- FBC 14 de Mayo
- Cerro Leon
- 15 de Mayo
- 16 de Agosto
- Tuyutí S.D.
- 24 de Junio

=== Liga Emboscadeña de Deportes ===
The Liga Emboscadeña de Deportes is based in the city of Emboscada. The following teams are part of this league:

- Guanahani
- Sol de América
- 22 de Setiembre
- Cerro Corá
- General Genes
- S.D. San Agustín
- Sportivo Colombia
- 24 de Junio
- S y D 6 de Enero

=== Liga Deportiva Nueva Colombia ===
The Liga Deportiva Nueva Colombia is based in the city of Nueva Colombia. The following teams are part of this league:

- Juventud Unido
- 1 de Enero
- Mcal. Lopez
- 6 de Enero
- Guaraní
- 15 de Agosto FBC
- Nanawa FBC
- Olimpia
- Cerro Porteño FC
- Union Escobar FBC

=== Liga Deportiva Piribebuy ===
The Liga Deportiva Piribebuy is based in the city of Piribebuy. The following teams are part of this league:

- 12 de Agosto
- Humaitá FBC
- Atletico Independiente
- Cap. Fabriciano Cristaldo
- Guaraní
- Sol de Mayo
- Sportivo Union
- Sportivo San Blas
- Juventud Cordillerana
- Mcal. Estigarribia
- 13 de Junio
- 15 de Agosto
- 3 de Febrero

=== Liga de Fútbol San Bernardino ===
The Liga de Fútbol San Bernardino is based in the city of San Bernardino. The following teams are part of this league:

- Nacional
- Atletico Juventud
- 24 de Setiembre
- 12 de Junio
- 12 de Junio
- Sol de Mayo
- 20 de Julio
- Cap. Ferreira
- 12 de Octubre
- 3 de Febrero
- Atletico 3 de Febrero

=== Liga Deportiva San José Obrero ===
The Liga Deportiva San José Obrero is based in the city of San José Obrero. The following teams are part of this league:

- Sol de America
- 4 de Agosto
- Deportiv San Jose Obrero
- Mayor Infante Rivarola
- 29 de Junio
- Atletico Porvenir
- Deportivo Héroes del Chaco
- Tte. Chena Molinas
- Deportivo Alfonsino
- Libertad

=== Liga Tobateña de Deportes ===
The Liga Tobateña de Deportes is based in the city of Tobatí. The following teams are part of this league:

- Cap. Pedro Juan Caballero
- Porvenir
- 15 de Mayo FBC
- Juventud Tobateña
- 6 de Enero
- 6 de Enero
- Libertad
- Teniente Brozzon
- Rubio Ñú
- 4 de Setiembre
- Sportivo 4 Vientos
- Triunfo
- Sportivo 24 de Julio
- 24 de Mayo
- 20 de Enero

=== Liga Deportiva del Yhaguy ===
The Liga Deportiva del Yhaguy is based in the city of Itacurubí de la Cordillera. The following teams are part of this league:

- 1 de Enero
- Sportivo Santa Clara
- 5 de Octubre
- General Escobar
- Capitan Aguilera
- Sportivo Valenzolano
- Cordillerano
- Nacional
- Centro Juvenil San Roqueño
- 30 de Agosto
- 4 de Julio
