= Lebanese Paraguayans =

اللبنانيين في باراغواي

Total population
- 200,000 descendants

Regions with significant populations
- Ciudad del Este, Asunción

Languages
- Paraguayan Spanish, Lebanese Arabic

Religion
- Majority: Christianity; Minorities: Islam

The arrival of immigrants of Lebanese origin to Paraguay consisted of many people who have settled in this country, bringing their customs and way of life. Many were the reasons which prompted these people to leave their native Lebanon and migrate to several Latin American countries, with the aim to seek a better quality of life after the World War I and the Second World War. In modern day, the large amount of Lebanese immigrants to Paraguay reside in Ciudad del Este, alongside neighbor city Foz do Iguaçu in Brazil, which has a large population of Lebanese immigrants. Lebanon has an embassy in the city of Asunción, whilst Paraguay has an embassy in the city of Beirut.

== History ==
=== 1943–1960 ===
After the First World War it passed to the hands of the French, from which it gained its independence on October 22, 1943, even though it declared its independence, the actions of the Second World War did not allow that this were fully effective until 1946. The intervention of Lebanon in the Arab-Israeli War 1948, its moral support to the Arabs in the Arab-Israeli War of Six Days (1967) and the arrival in the country of many Palestinians, have meant a constant hostility with neighboring Israel, first in 1970 and then in 1982, triggering the latter occasion in a bout in Beirut, which did not cease until the departure from Lebanon of Palestinian guerrillas. This situation resulted from immigration of many Lebanese in the late nineteenth century and the beginning of the century in search of a better perspective of life. With effort they managed to succeed in a different society from their culture. The immigration of the Lebanese to Paraguay can be divided into two eras: ancient and modern. Among the reasons which prompted the uprooting are included both the political reason, and also the economic one. The political reason responds to the need to escape the troubled relations that have emerged during the Ottoman Empire in the region. The economic reason lies in the many disappointments and poverty, the consequences of World War I. The strategic position of Lebanon in the Mediterranean Sea has meant ongoing invasions. It was part of Syria and the Ottoman Empire until 1918. In a second term after the Second World War, where thousands of people, mostly men, took the decision to leave the mother homeland because of the havoc that the war had caused. In this journey towards finding a better future, they had to undertake long voyages in boats, often without knowing where they embark and disembark where it was even worse. In these trips they had to deal with many troubles, diseases and nostalgia. They were forced to withstand natural disasters of all kinds in the middle of the sea.

=== Arrival to Paraguay (1960–1970) ===
Their first destination was the harbour of Buenos Aires Argentina where they arrived without even speaking Spanish and without knowing its customs. But they did not take much to adapt and strive to rebuild a decent life, forming households and having children without forgetting their roots. They were organized in groups and communities, in order to find the best place to settle. Following trips by rivers or on trains until they came to Paraguay and then distributed in various places of the country where trade could be a prominent occupation. They settle in Asunción, the country's capital, and also in Concepción, Villa del Rosario, Villarrica, Itacurubí del Rosario, Itacurubí de la Cordillera, Encarnación, San Estanislao, Pedro Juan Caballero, Caraguatay and other cities. Mixing with Paraguayan society and after much effort and work they could open shops, factories or cultivate the land. They dedicated not only learn the Castilian but also the Guaraní, they fought in the Chaco War, participated with their civilization and helped build the country. They joined their lives in marriage to men and women of Paraguay and respected the cultural identity of the country that hosted them. They taught their children the values of love for the two cultures, which created clubs and associations that still preserve their traditions. The last major contingent of immigrants arrived in Paraguay in the late 60s and early 70s.

=== 1970–onwards ===
The majority of Lebanese-Paraguayans are Christians who belong to the Maronite Church, Roman Catholic, Eastern Orthodox and Melkite Catholic. A scant number are Muslims. In addition to being of Lebanese descent, there are Paraguayans of Syrian and Palestinian origin as well. From the 1970s, Sunni Muslim Arabs moved to the Ciudad del Este. This changed in the 1980s to Shia Muslim Arabs from South Lebanon.

In 2010, Ciudad del Este's INTERPOL office had captured a Lebanese man of 37 years, Moussa Ali Hamdan, accused of terrorism in the city centre of Ciudad del Este. He was under an order of capture by the United States of America. It was also suspected that Hamdan financed terrorism.

In 2011, a Lebanese man was arrested at the regional office of Interpol in Ciudad del Este because of identification problems, having been expelled from France. The man said that his name was Toufic Harb but his real identity is Zidane Khaleb. He was captured at the Guaraní International Airport.

In a 2012 article published on terrorists in Paraguay, Al Jazeera reported that Hezbollah "remained especially active" in the tri-border area of Argentina–Paraguay–Brazil. José Almada, a superior officer in the Paraguayan Special Operations Group (GEO) said that they had not uncovered any evidence of terrorist cells in Ciudad del Este.

In 2014, ABC Color published an article in which the Lebanese community question the utilization of students of the Lebanese Educational Centre of Paraguay in Ciudad del Este, in acts of political movements linked to terrorist group Hezbolá. Members of the Lebanese community in the region expressed their disagreement with the way the institute is run.

== Surnames ==
Many Arabic surnames from Lebanon today stand out in Paraguayan society as political leaders, national authorities, businessmen, writers and people dedicated to the arts in general. Some of these surnames were modified to improve their pronunciation in Spanish but many retain their original identity.

Common surnames are:

Aboud, Aid, Armel, Arar, Rossi, Atat, Ayala, Azar, Barchini, Buzarquis, Canan/Kanan, Nader, Cofure, Curi/Kuri/Juri, Daher, Damus, Diaz, Dibb, Elias, Esgaib/Zgaib, Esquef/Skef, Fadlala, Fadul, Farah, Garcia, Ghobril, Giral, Gosen/Gosn/Ghosn/Hosen, Haddad, Haitter/Haidar, Harare, Host, Ismael/Ysmail, Kalfat, Mohur, Maluff, Mancos, Mende, Musi, Ouchana, Rahi, Resck/Risk, Rosas, Sabag, Safua, Sardi, Seif din, Serrano, Toumi, Tours, Torres, Yambay/Yampey, Yanho, Yauhari, Yore, Yunis.

== Notable people ==
- Ángel Antar – Former association footballer for Paraguay.
- Ángel Roberto Seifart – Senior politician from the Colorado Party.
- Antonio Buzarquis – Politician.
- Bader Rachid Lichi – Political leader.
- Enrique Salyn Buzarquis – Politician.
- George Wannis – Long serving consul in Lebanon Embassy in Asunción.
- Oscar Daher – Political leader.
- Osvaldo Dominguez Dibb – Businessman and sports leader, former president of Primera División Paraguaya club Olimpia Asunción.
- Oscar Fadlala – Nephew of former prominent musician.
- Oscar Safuán – Renowned musician.
- Julio Manzur – Association footballer for Primera División Paraguaya club Rubio Ñú, earned a silver medal with Paraguay under-23 football team at 2004 Summer Olympics and represented Paraguay at the 2004 Copa América, 2006 FIFA World Cup and 2007 Copa América.
- Mario Abdo Benítez – 51st President of Paraguay
- Pedro Fadul – Devoted to politics. Candidate for President of the Republic for the period 2003–2008 and 2008–2013.
- Quemil Yambay – Prominent in the national Music, is also a great humorist.
- Juan José Zapag – President of Primera División Paraguaya club Cerro Porteño.
