= Primero de Marzo =

- Interactive map of Primero de Marzo
- Coordinates: 25°27′S 56°51′W
- Country: Paraguay
- Department: Cordillera

Government
  - Intendente Municipal: Jorge Agüero Arriola

Area
  - Total: 159 km^{2} (61 sq mi)
- Elevation: 155 m (509 ft)

Population (2022)
  - Total: 4,997
  - Density: 31.4/km^{2} (81.4/sq mi)
- Time zone: -4 Gmt
- Postal code: 3180
- Area code: (595) (516)

Primero de Marzo (or 1° de Marzo) is a small town and district located in the marshy lowlands of the Cordillera Department in Paraguay. The area is near the Yhaguy river, a shallow body utilized by locals primarily for fishing and recreation. Primero de Marzo's name is derived from the date March 1, 1870, when then Paraguayan President Francisco Solano López was killed by Brazilian troops at Cerro Corá, thereby ending the bloody War of the Triple Alliance.

== Demographics ==
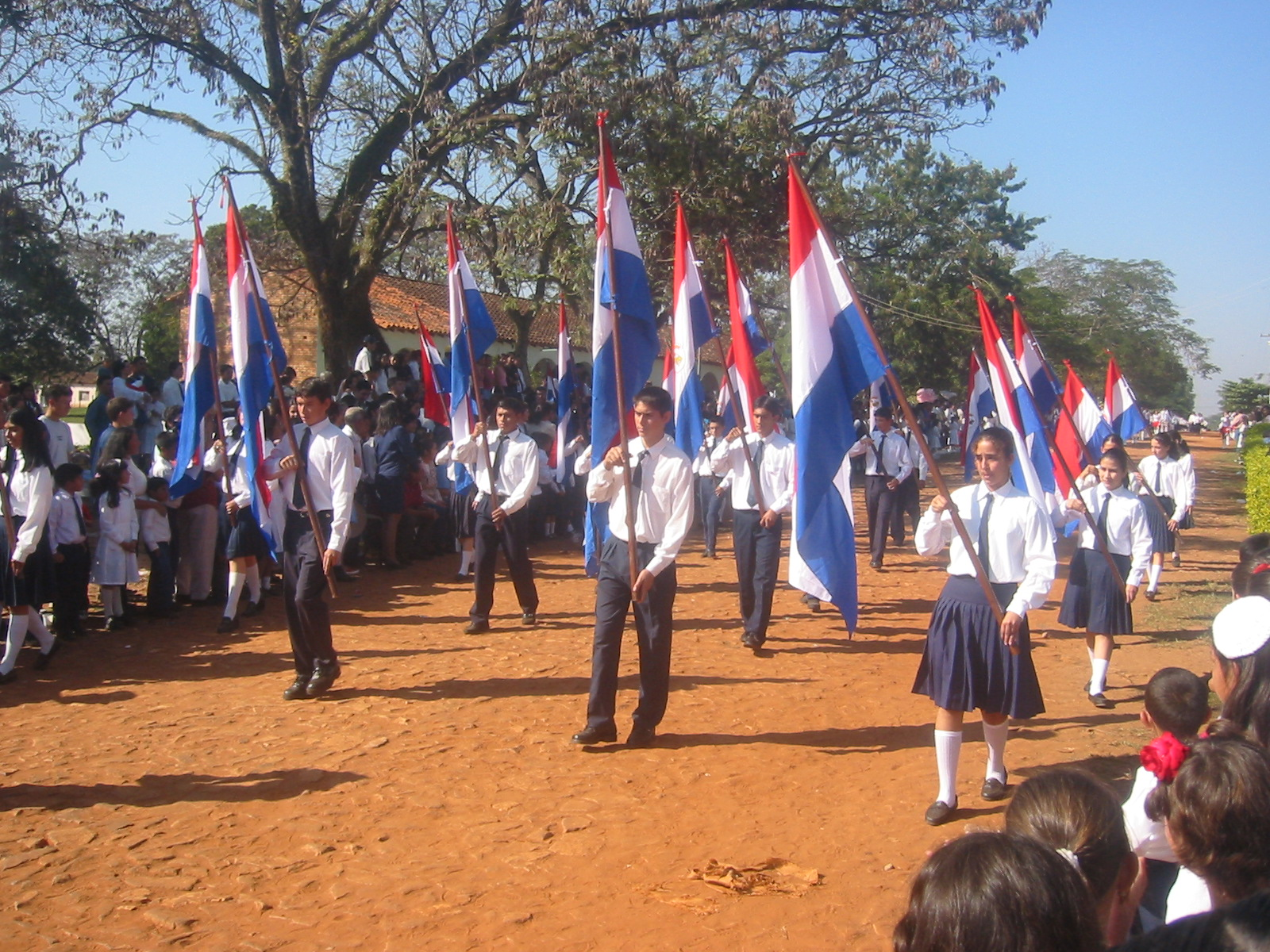
Local students parading during the celebration of Cerro Corá

According to the 2002 National Paraguayan census, Primero de Marzo had a population of 6,019 inhabitants. Some of the larger outlying rural campos include General Diaz, Sargento Cabellero, San Isidro, and Mariscal Estigarribia. Running water and electricity is available to the urban inhabitants, but only some of the rural campos. There are very few landlines for telephone service in the area. The most reliable lines are at the Municipality and the Cooperative, Niño Jesus Ltd. Currently, there is limited internet or cellular phone service in the area due to the geography and poor public infrastructure.

== History and culture ==
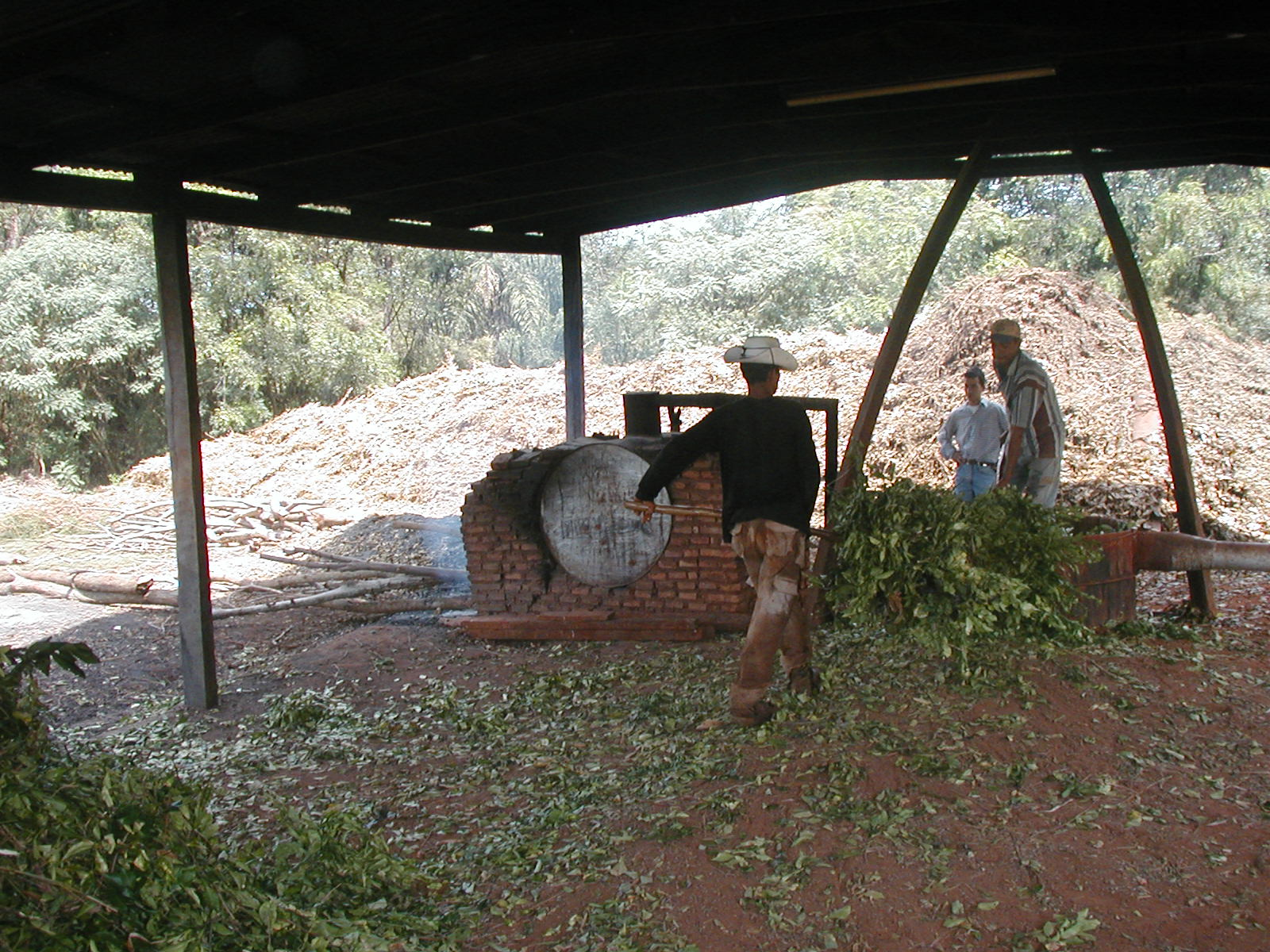
Processing petitgrain in the rural campo of Sargento Cabellero

Primero de Marzo was founded in 1931 as "Colonia Primero de Marzo" under the aegis of the district of Caraguatay. On June 23, 1955, the town was declared its own departmental district by presidential decree from dictator Alfredo Stroessner. Primero de Marzo is sometimes called by its lesser known name of Colonia Alphonso Tranquera. The town celebrates its Fiesta Patronal on December 25 in honor of its patron saint Niño Jesus. Other large fiestas celebrated in the area include Cerra Corá (March 1), Pascua (Easter), la fiesta de San Juan (June), and la fiesta de San Blas (February 3).

== Economy ==
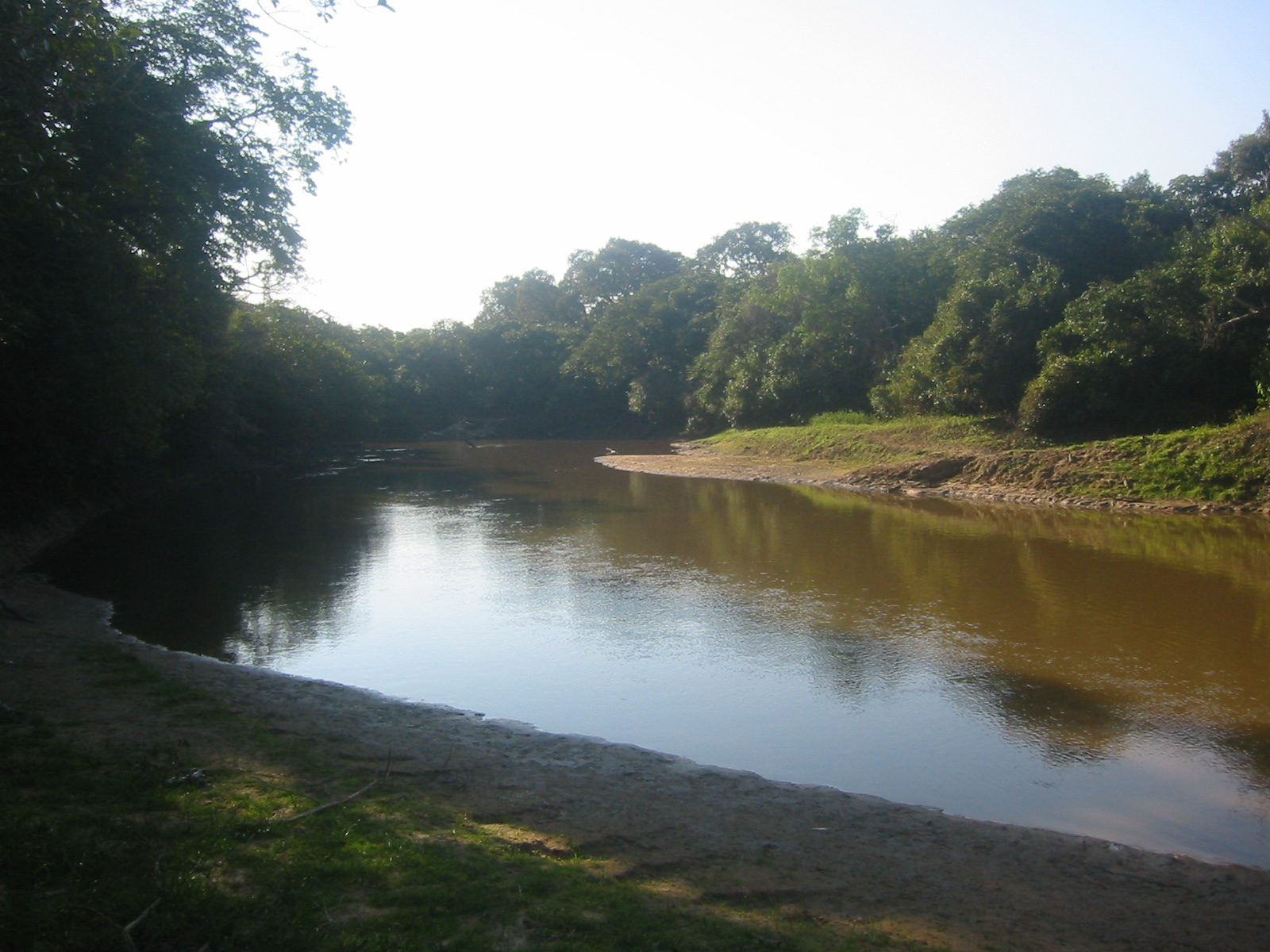
Yhaguy river near Primero de Marzo

A rural agricultural area, Primero de Marzo is centered in a region well known for its high-quality production of petitgrain (orange essence) from the bitter orange tree (citrus aurantium). This petitgrain is generally exported to Europe for use in perfumes and skin care products. The vast majority of the harvest, production, and sale of this crop of petitgrain is organized by members of the small credit and marketing cooperative Niño Jesus Ltd. Other important crops in the area include mandioca (yuca), ka'a he'ê (stevia), watermelon, tomato, pineapple, cotton, and soybeans. Fishfarming production of Tilapia is becoming increasingly important in the rural campos.

== Transportation ==
The bus company Empresa 1º de Marzo operates out of the town center and maintains hourly service (3½ hours) to Asunción passing through the Cordillera towns of Isla Pucú, Eusebio Ayala District, and finally Caacupe via Ruta 2 - Monday through Saturday. While the majority of Primero de Marzo's roads remain unpaved, flooding during the Paraguayan wet season does not adversely affect bus service to and from the Asunción bus terminal as the main exit road is paved in crude cobble stone until its convergence with a paved highway at Isla Pucú. Daily morning service to Arroyos y Esteros and Ruta 3 usually can be made by contracting private transportation in town; however, this route is subject to frequent rain washout.
