= Atyrá =

- City
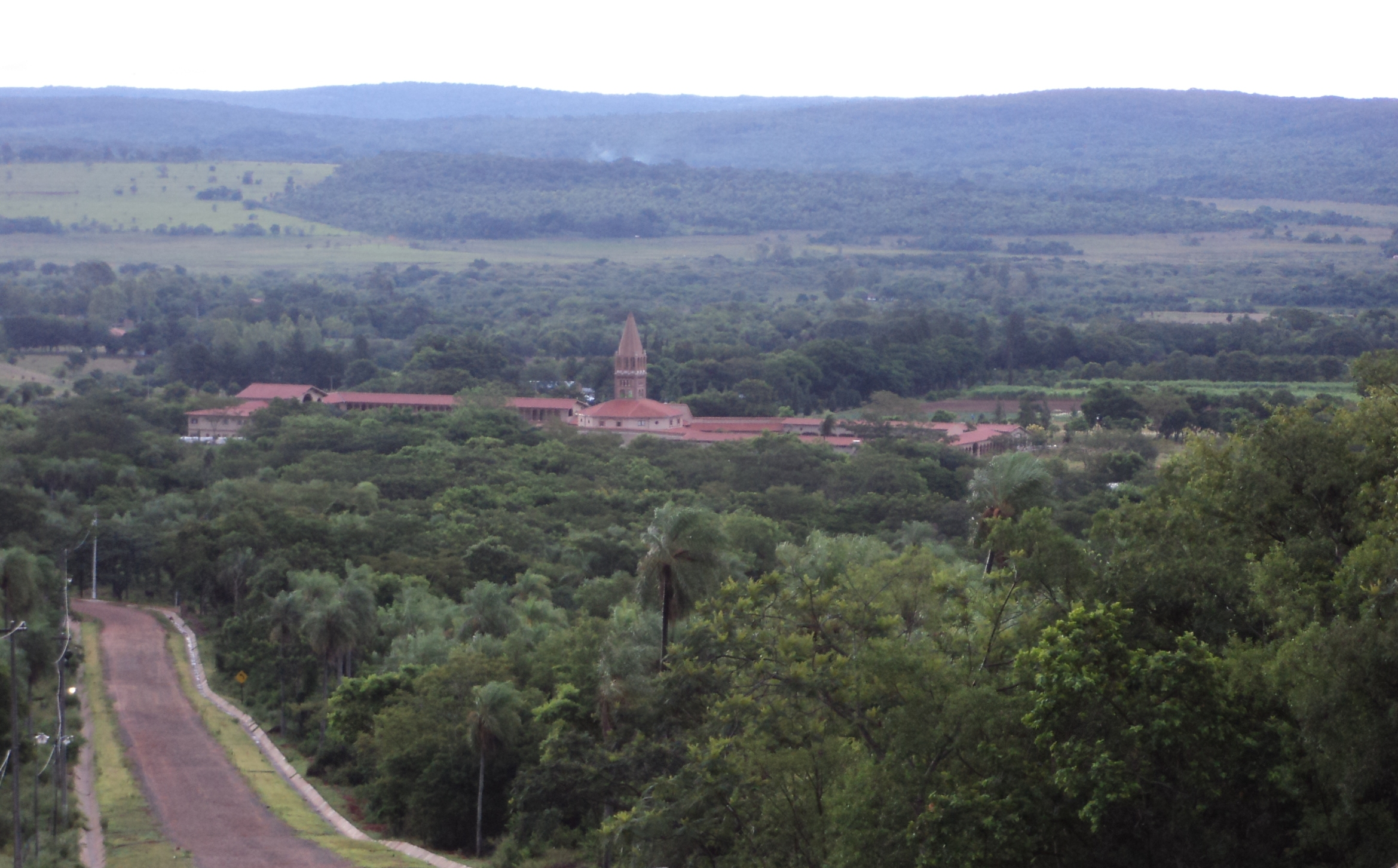
- Atyrá, Paraguay

- Location within Paraguay
- Coordinates: 25°16′43″S 57°10′14″W
- Country: Paraguay
- Department: Cordillera
- Founded: October 4, 1538; 487 years ago
- Elevation: 95 m (312 ft)

Population
  - Total: 15,278
- Time zone: UTC-04 (AST)
  - Summer (DST): UTC-04 (ADT)
- Area code: +595 (520)
- Climate: Cfa

Atyrá is a city located in the Cordillera Department of central Paraguay. Situated in the Cordillera de Altos, the city lies approximately 61 kilometers east of the national capital, Asuncion.

It's recognized as one of the oldest settlements in the country, alongside other historic cities such as Yaguaron, Villarrica, Encarnacion, Pilar, San Lorenzo and Humaita.

== Original name and founding ==
Atyrá, initially named Atyhá, was founded by the governor Domingo Martínez de Irala in 1538. The word "Atyhá" is of Guaraní origin. It used to be a Guaraní village, and was named for being the meeting place of its residents.

== Geography ==
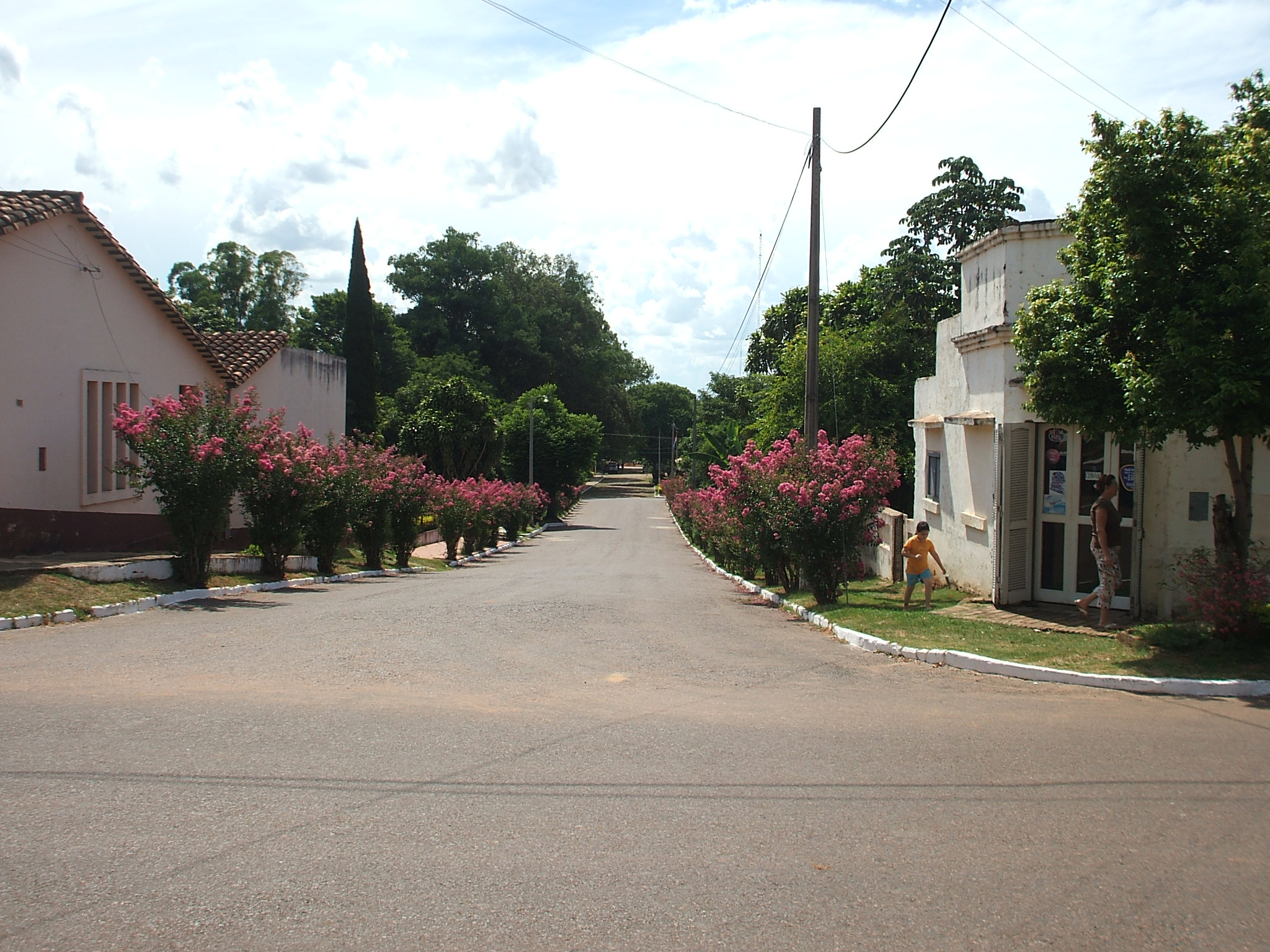
A street of the city

Located in the Altos Cordillera, the landscape of the city has large extensions of rocks that form undulations.

It is bounded to the north by the city of Arroyos y Esteros, to the north-east by Loma Grande District, to the south by Tobatí, to the west by the Altos, and to the south-east by San Bernardino and Ypacarai.

=== Climate ===
The climate is mild and dry. The average temperature is 22 °C, reaching 39 °C in the summer, and in winter dropping to 3 °C.

== Demographics ==
Atyrá has an estimated population of 18.042 inhabitants according to the projections of the national Statistics, Polls and Census General Direction.

The population density is 70 inhabitants per kilometer.

== Neighborhoods and districts ==
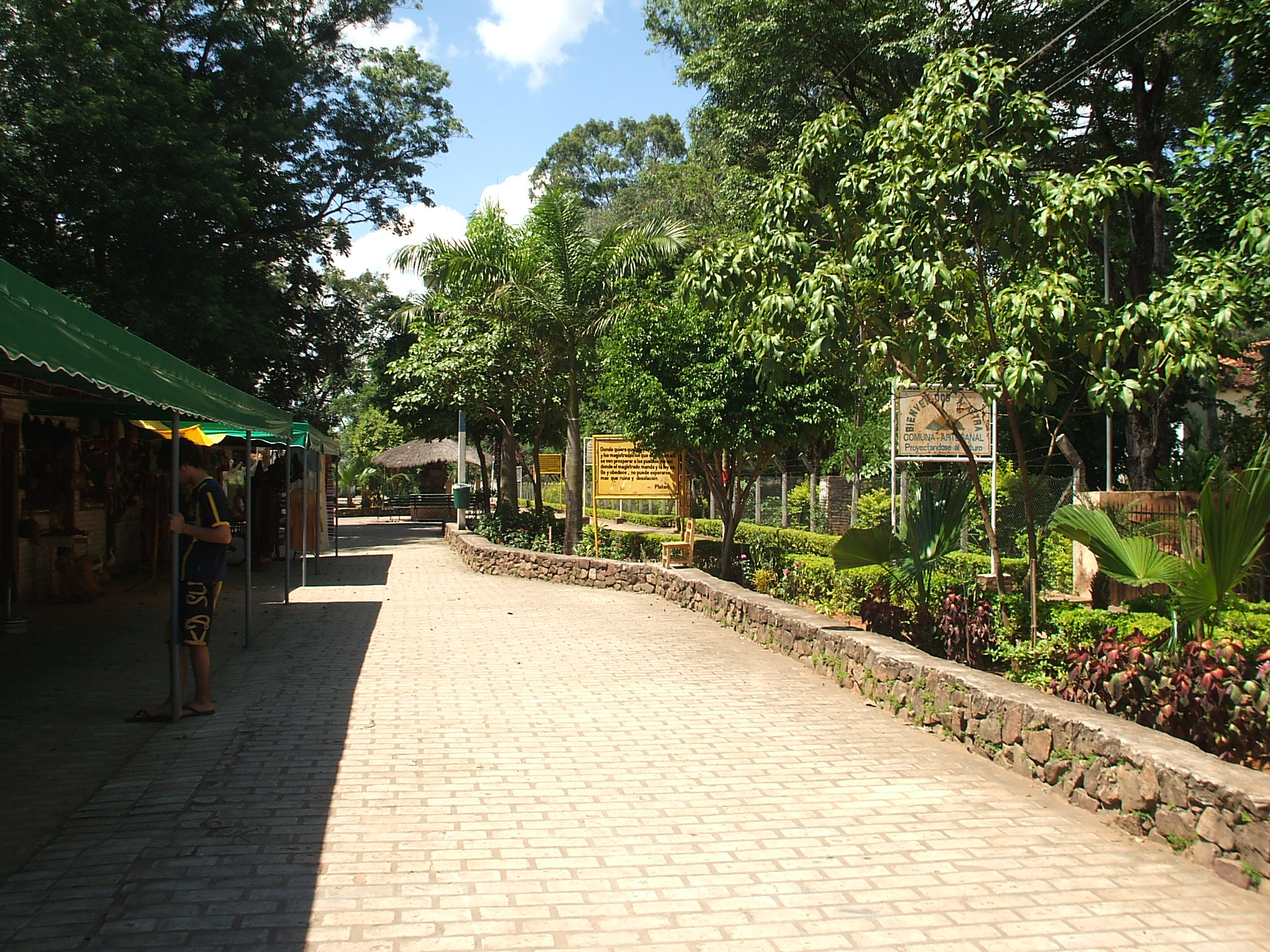
Permanent exposition of artisans

Most of the housing in Atyra is modern, but a few houses date from the XIX century, showing the architecture and details of the typical constructions of the Colonial period, including houses with ceilings of hay and surrounded by trees and palms typical of the area.

The city is divided into an urban and a rural area. In the urban area the neighborhoods are:

- San Antonio
- San Blás
- Las Mercedes
- María Auxiliadora

In the rural area are these localities:

- Candia
- San Vicente
- Gral. Bernardino Caballero
- Zanja hú
- Comandante Ojeda
- Caacupemí
- Tacuaty
- Mbururú
- Candia Loma
- Catumbey
- Cauguá
- Potrero
- Monte Alto

== History ==
The governor Domingo Martínez de Irala founded the city in 1539. The act of foundation was made under the shadow of three Yvapovó plants, in a place that the natives used as a place of meeting, and from this came the name "Atyhá" that finally became "Atyrá". In 1580, Franciscan missionaries led by Alonso de San Buenaventura and Fray Luis de Bolaños, made the religious foundation of the localities: Altos, Atyrá, Tobatí and Yaguarón.

== Church of San Francisco De Asis, Atyra ==
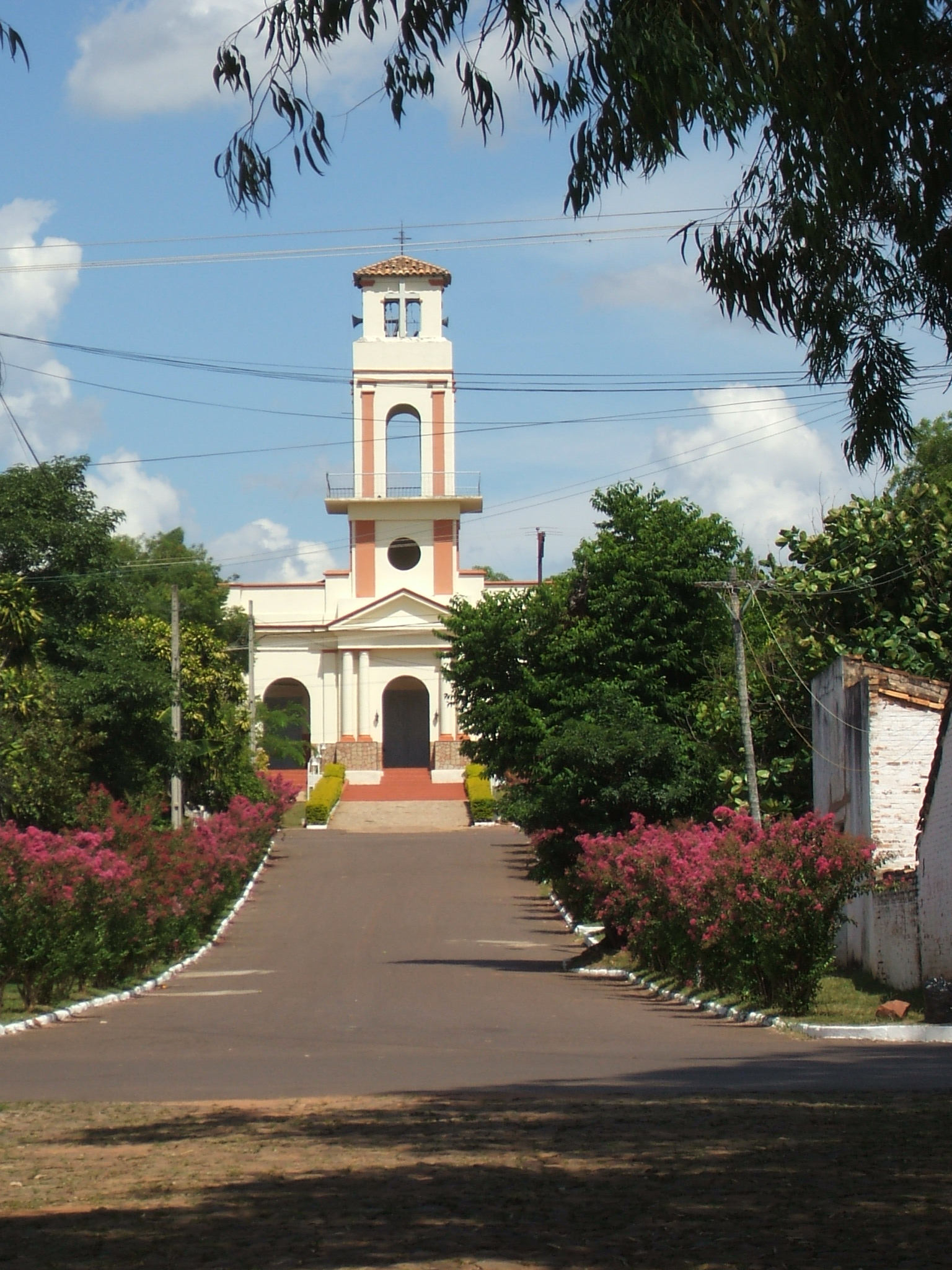
Church of Atyrá

The church of San Francisco De Asis is nowadays a museum of sacred art that exhibits carvings in wood made by the natives since 1580, with a Baroque Hispano-Guaraní style.

The building of the church started around 1782, impelled by the priest Father Almada, who also encouraged the population of the city to develop some mechanical and artisan abilities.

The church building was remodeled in 1852 by command of the President of Paraguay at that time, Carlos Antonio López. It was replaced in 1928 with the building that still stands today.

Since that time, the town developed and grew around the church, as was traditional with most of the towns in Paraguay throughout its history. Three of the four walls of the building served as the start of the new construction, and the wall that faces southeast does not present any sign of another edifice having been built.

The church is not located in the epicenter of the city; it is actually displayed more like the perspective of an avenue, as if it was the beginning or the end of the city. In its interior, it retains the altar built in the 18th century and the statues that represent the Virgin of Sorrows, Saint Francis, Saint Lucía, Virgin of Candelaria, María Auxiliadora, and Saint Catalina, among others, all created under the teaching of the Franciscan missionaries.

== Economy ==
The population of the city works mostly in agriculture and cattle, and it also has coconut oil factories and sawmills.

The people of the city also maintain the continuity of the artisan characteristics of the Colonial period, especially in saddlery.

== Arts and culture ==
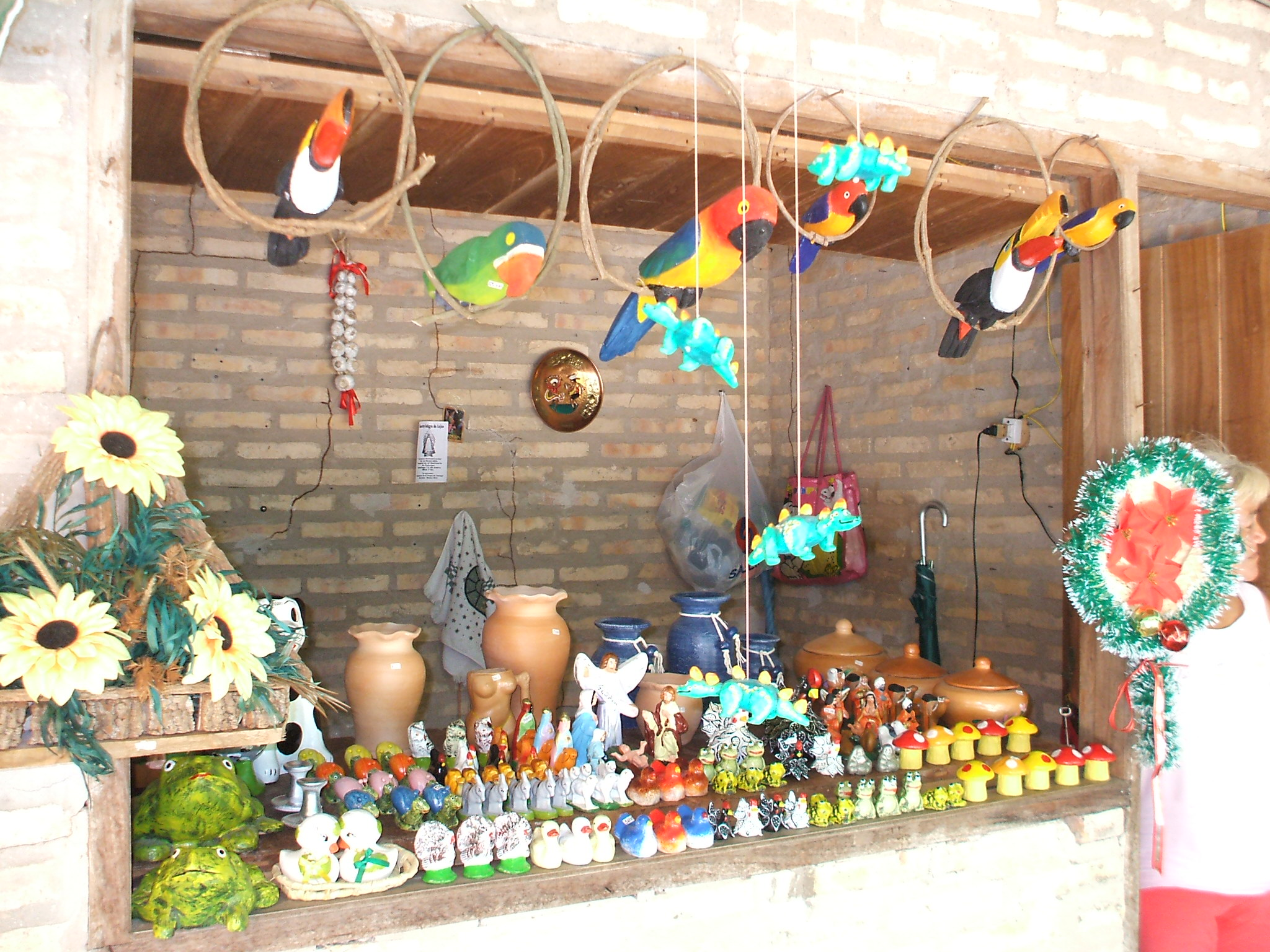
Artisan of wood

This city is known for its artisan work in leather and fabric. Its artisans also work in the creation of wooden objects. Their production is displayed in a permanent market installed in the middle of the city.

The religious holiday of Saint Francis of Assisi, the patron saint of the city, is celebrated on October 4.

== Traditional culture ==
A widely known story from Paraguayan folklore has its origin in Atyrá: the story of the Indio José, who found himself trapped during a violent storm in the area and begged for help from the Virgin of the Immaculate Conception. He is said to have miraculously found a tree to climb on the Zanja Hú Hill, which saved his life. The Indio José had promised the Virgin to carve an image for her, so he did, and that same image is now part of the altar in the religious center of Paraguay, the Caacupé Basilica.

== Artisan craftsmanship ==
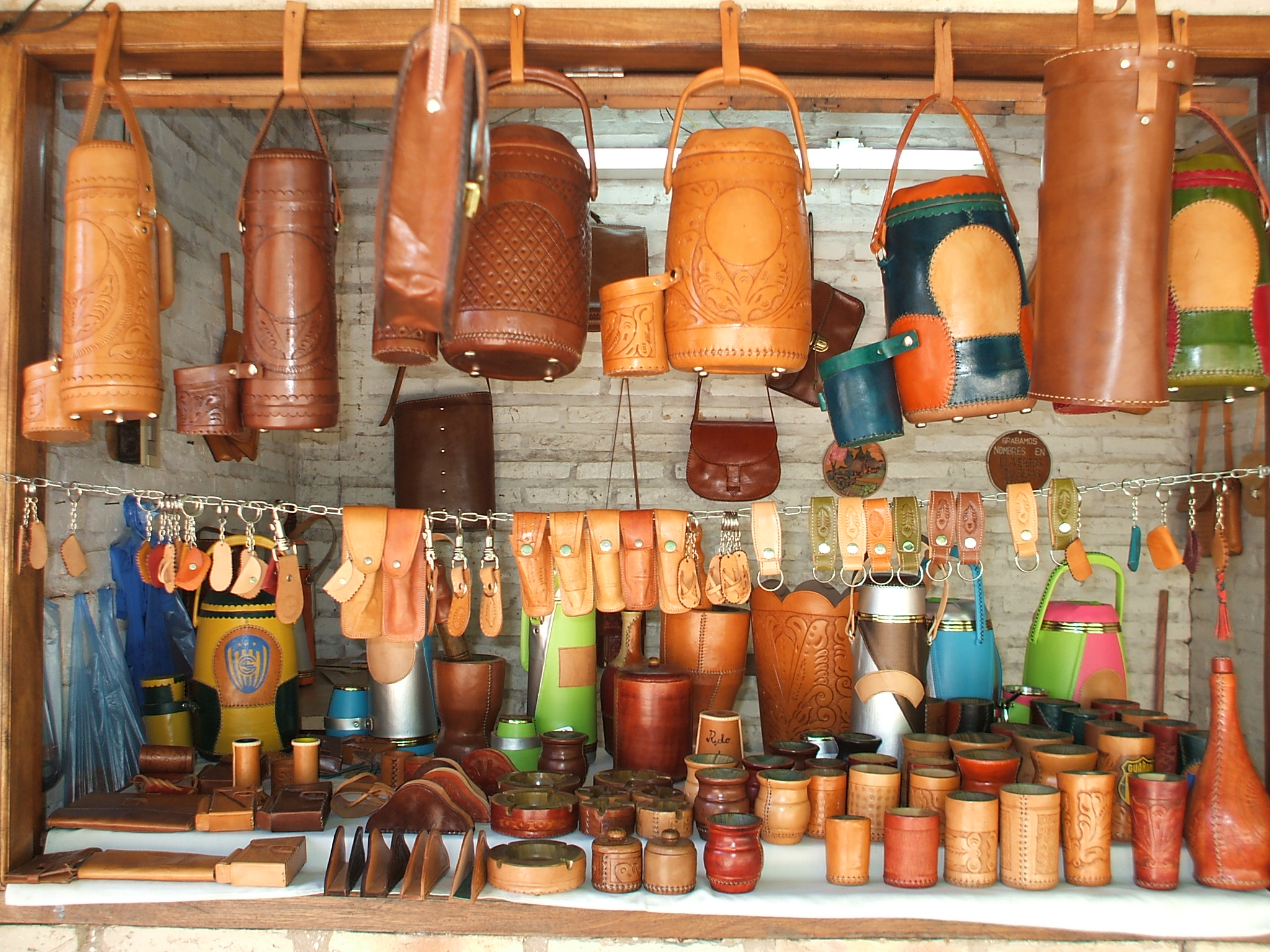
Artisan craftsmanship in leather

Artisans' carving of wood is economically the second most important activity of the city. This artisan activity started in the colonial period, by the Franciscan missionaries. The usual themes for the carvings in wood include saints, legendary creatures, animals and others.

Many families also create leather crafts including bags, backpacks, shoes, belts, saddles, and others.

Woodworking is very popular and widespread, dating back to the Franciscan and Jesuit eras. All kinds of figures can be found: animals, religious carvings, gourds for tereré (a traditional Paraguayan drink), and musical instruments (harps and guitars). Production centers vary greatly depending on the objects produced. Also noteworthy are the works of the "santeros" (sculptors of wooden icons who draw on the rich Jesuit tradition) and the musical instruments (guitars and harps) made from native woods, which are highly valued worldwide.

== Tourism ==
The city has a "Casa de la Cultura" (House of Culture), which displays the work made by the artisans of the city.

Atyrá has a variety of fauna and flora, especially in the area of Zanja Hú. It has several streams that are used for swimming and practicing water sports. Carumbey means "Turtle’s stream".

Another notable landmark is the Complejo Marianela, administered by the redemptorist missionaries. It's a multifunctional retreat that features and architectural style inspired by European medieval monasteries and Greco-Roman structures, blended with Paraguayan craftmanship and art

== Municipality ==
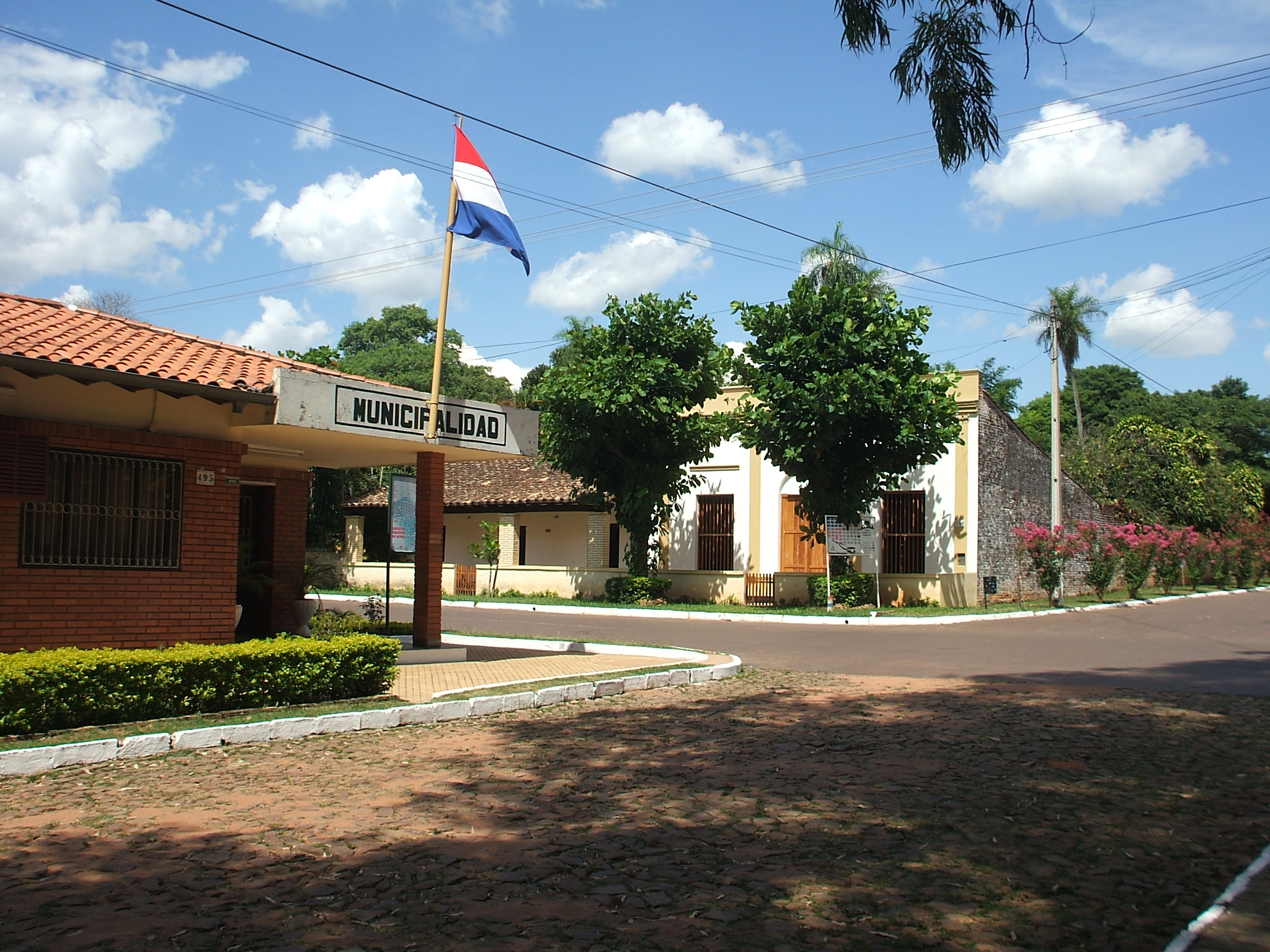
Municipality of Atyra

Atyrá is known as the "Cleanest city of Paraguay", the seventh-most clean in America and the eighth-healthiest community in the world, certified by the World Health Organization. It was also declared "Ecological Capital of Paraguay" by a government decree. This followed a municipal initiative sponsoring the protection of the environment and ecological preservation among its inhabitants.
