= Quemil Yambay =

Paraguayan singer (1938–2026)

- Born: Quemil Yambay Rodríguez; 10 March 1938; Santa Elena, Paraguay
- Died: 14 January 2026 (aged 87) Asunción, Paraguay
- Genres: Paraguayan polka; folk; Guarania
- Occupations: Musician; singer; composer; impressionist
- Years active: 1960–2017

Quemil Yambay Rodríguez (10 March 1938 – 14 January 2026) was a Paraguayan musician, singer, composer and impersonator, considered one of the greatest exponents of Paraguayan music. He enjoyed an artistic career spanning more than 50 years, recognized for his unique stage style, which combined imitations of animal sounds, anecdotes, jokes in Guaraní, and historical narratives with singing.

== Early life ==
Quemil Yambay Rodríguez was born on 10 March 1938, in a remote place located between the banks of the Cordillera Mountains in Paraguay, called Tupaorã, belonging to the jurisdiction of Caraguatay. He was the fourth of ten children, born to Marina de la Paz Rodríguez, of Paraguayan nationality, and Jalil Yambay, who was of Lebanese origin. He studied until the fourth grade and, due to his family's unfavorable economic conditions, was forced to leave school.

Yambay had relationships with two women named "Lidia". The first was with Lidia Mariana—the muse of one of his most famous songs—in the mid-1960s, with whom he had a daughter named Carmiña. Later, he married Lidia Alvarenga and had two sons, Ulises and Chahian, and two daughters, Amiri and Hilda.

== Career ==
=== Los Alfonsinos ===
In 1960, Yambay formed a musical duo with Pablo Barrios. The following year, in 1961, he founded the group known as Los Alfonsinos. This group consisted of Gregorio Martínez and Cirilo Ortega, originally from Alfonso Loma, and Pablo Barrios and Francisco Martínez, from Alfonso Central. Yambay himself was from Alfonso Tranquera, the town where he spent his childhood, and from there the group's name originates. Los Alfonsinos are considered the most representative group of the musical style known as purahéi jahe'o (from the Guaraní language, meaning bitter song, mournful song, or plaintive song), a variant of the Paraguayan polka characterized by its melancholic melody that largely reflects the hardships of the Paraguayan peasantry.

For several years, Yambay was the leader of the musical group Los Alfonsinos, performing approximately 200 times a year and recording more than 30 albums of polka and guarania. His music was very successful, and he earned two Gold Records in recognition of high sales of his recordings, in 1978 and 1992.

Over time, Yambay further distinguished himself as an imitator, eventually reproducing the sounds of up to 100 different animals. This ability became one of the added attractions of his performances, captivating audiences with his talent for imitating a wide variety of animal species.

=== Rise to fame ===
According to Yambay's statements and the perception of some national media, it is considered that songs such as Mokõi Guyra'i, Lidia Mariana (1970), and "Yo encontré una flor y Areko cuatro kuña" were some of the biggest hits that catapulted him to fame. His songs were used in campaigns by various presidential candidates.

=== Imitations ===
From an early age, Yambay began to develop his passion for imitating various animal species. At the age of eight, he had his first performance on stage, where he performed imitations of dogs and farm and jungle animals he knew at the time. In an interview with the newspaper Crónica, Yambay commented that his classmates were moved and even teared up when they saw how he could imitate others.

Yambay possessed the ability to replicate a wide variety of sounds, especially those of country birds, although he was also able to imitate the sounds of a duck, goose, parrot, pig, turkey, dogs of different breeds, and cats with different types of meows, among others. These imitation skills are mainly attributed to his childhood experiences on his mother's farm, where she was an animal lover and cared for more than a dozen dogs, cats, ducks, pigs, chickens, and other animals, both domestic and wild.

=== Later years and retirement ===
The 13th edition of the Chipá National Festival that combines art, tradition and culture, held in August 2013, was in tribute to Quemil Yambay. He debuted in New York in May 2016 with a concert celebrating Paraguay's Independence. The event took place at two venues: on 14 May at John Bowne High School in Queens and on 15 May at Café Imperial in New Jersey.

On 22 October 2017, Yambay participated in the program "El saber va contigo" broadcast on Canal 13, where he announced his retirement. Six days later, at 79 years of age and after almost six decades in the business, Yambay decided to end his artistic career. His farewell event, titled "El Último Sapukái" (The Last Sapukái), took place at the Bicentennial Stadium in Ypacaraí.

=== Death ===
Yambay died on 14 January 2026, at the age of 87.

== Discography ==
- Los Alfonsinos – Director: Quemil Yambay, Dúo: Barrios–Yambay (1964, Discos Cerro Corá)
- Conjunto Espectáculo «Los Alfonsinos» (1964, Discos Cerro Corá)
- Quemil Yambay, el Imitador de las Selvas Guaraníes, y su conjunto «Los Alfonsinos» – Cantan: Godoy–Yambay (1967, Discos Cerro Corá)
- Quemil Yambay y su conjunto: Los Alfonsinos (1970, Discos Cerro Corá)
- Dúo: Barrios-Yambay y Los Alfonsinos – «Che mbaraka oñemyrõ» (1970, Discos Cerro Corá)
- Quemil Yambay y su conjunto: Los Alfonsinos – cantan: Godoy~Yambay (1970, Discos Cerro Corá)
- Quemil Yambay y su gran conjunto: Los Alfonsinos – cantan: Godoy~Yambay (1971, Discos Cerro Corá)
- Quemil Yambay y su conjunto Los Alfonsinos – cantan: Godoy–Yambay (1972, Discos Cerro Corá)
- Barrios~Yambay con los incomparables: Alfonsinos..! El Dúo Más Querido del Paraguay..! (1973, Discos Cerro Corá)
- Serpentina de Éxitos por: Quemil Yambay y su conjunto Los Alfonsinos – cantan: Godoy~Yambay (1974, Discos Cerro Corá)
- El reencuentro triunfal del: Dúo: Barrios–Yambay y Los Alfonsinos (1975, Discos Cerro Corá)
- Dúo: Barrios Yambay y Los Alfonsinos (1977, Discos Cerro Corá)
- Che Mbotavy Raka'e - Dúo: Barrios–Yambay (1979, Discos Cerro Corá)
- Gool Paraguayo – Quemil Yambay y su conjunto Los Alfonsinos (1980, Discos Cerro Corá)
- Quemil Yambay y su conjunto Los Alfonsinos – Dúo: Barrios–Yambay (1984, Discos Cerro Corá)
- Quemil Yambay y su conjunto Los Alfonsinos – Dúo: Godoy–Yambay (1985, Discos Cerro Corá)
- Quemil Yambay y su conjunto Los Alfonsinos – Cantan: Godoy–Yambay (1987, Discos Cerro Corá)
- Lorito Oga – Quemil Yambay y su conjunto Los Alfonsinos / Cantan: Godoy–Yambay (1988, Discos Cerro Corá)
- 3 de Febrero pe guare – Quemil Yambay y su conjunto Los Alfonsinos / Dúo: Godoy–Yambay (1989, Discos Cerro Corá)
- Mba'erã la Ñamendase – Quemil Yambay, Los Alfonsinos (1992, Discos Cerro Corá)
- Farra'ihápe Guare – Quemil Yambay y los Alfonsinos (1994, Discos Cerro Corá)
- Ajupíta de Presidente – Quemil Yambay · Los Alfonsinos (1994, Discos Cerro Corá)
- La Ajupírõ de Presidente – Quemil Yambay y su conjunto «Los Alfonsinos» (1995, Discos Cerro Corá)
- Quemil Yambay (con Chahián y Ulises Yambay) (1996, Discos Cerro Corá)
- Quemil Yambay - Los Alfonsinos (1997, Discos Cerro Corá)
- Iguãinguîngue iselósa · Quemil Yambay – «Los Alfonsinos» (1998, Discos Cerro Corá)
- Quemil Yambay y «Los Alfonsinos» – Entre Polcas y Chamamé (1998, ARP Audio Stereo Digital)
- 20 Grandes Éxitos – Quemil Yambay y su conjunto Los Alfonsinos «Nueva Versión» (2003, ARP Audio Stereo Digital)
- Che pore'ỹme reho – Quemil Yambay y Los Alfonsinos (2004, ARP Audio Stereo Digital)
- Quemil Yambay y Los Alfonsinos - Añetéiko la che rayhu (2006, The Song Producciones Discográficas)
- Quemil Yambay - 50 Años de trayectoria con el Folklore (2010, The Song Producciones Discográficas)
- Lo Mejor de Quemil Yambay / Los Alfonsinos (2010, Sapukái Musical Pyahu)
- Kokueréro Purahéi - Quemil Yambay y Los Alfonsinos (2019, Sapukái Musical Pyahu).

== Bibliography ==
- Meza, Miguelángel (2011). Quemil Yambay Ka'aguay purahéi. Asunción, Paraguay: Salemma "Biografía en vida". ISBN 978-84-249-2230-6.
