= Nueva Colombia =

Nueva Colombia may refer to:

- Nueva Colombia District, in Paraguay
- Liga Deportiva Nueva Colombia, in Paraguay
- Agencia de Noticias Nueva Colombia (ANNCOL)
