= Valenzuela, Paraguay =

Valenzuela
- District
- Location in Paraguay
- Coordinates: 25°34′S 56°51′W
- Country: Paraguay
- Department: Cordillera

Government
  - Mayor: Eladio Galeano Lugo

Area
  - Total: 173 km^{2} (67 sq mi)

Population (2002)
  - Total: 5,581
  - Density: 32.3/km^{2} (83.6/sq mi)
- Time zone: UTC-04 (AST)
  - Summer (DST): UTC-03 (ADT)
- Postal code: 3070

Valenzuela is a town and district of the Cordillera Department, Paraguay, located some 107 km from Asunción. It was founded in 1783 in an area previously known as Yvyraity. The full name of the settlement was Capilla de Valenzuela de los Naranjos because it was formed around a Chapel of San Jose, built by father Antonio Fernandez de Valenzuela.

As of 2002, the district's population amounted to 5,581.

Economy is based on agriculture, especially cultivation of pineapples. The parish church of Valenzuela houses a Baroque pulpit dating to the first Jesuit missions in the country.
