= Mbocayaty del Yhaguy =

- Location within Paraguay
- Coordinates: 25°19′48″S 56°43′12″W
- Country: Paraguay
- Department: Cordillera

Population (2008)
  - Total: 601

Mbocayaty del Yhaguy is a town in the Cordillera department of Paraguay.

== Sources ==
- World Gazeteer: Paraguay – World-Gazetteer.com
