= Cordillera Department =

Department of Paraguay

Cordillera Departamento de Cordillera (Spanish) Tetãvore Cordillera (Guarani)
- Department
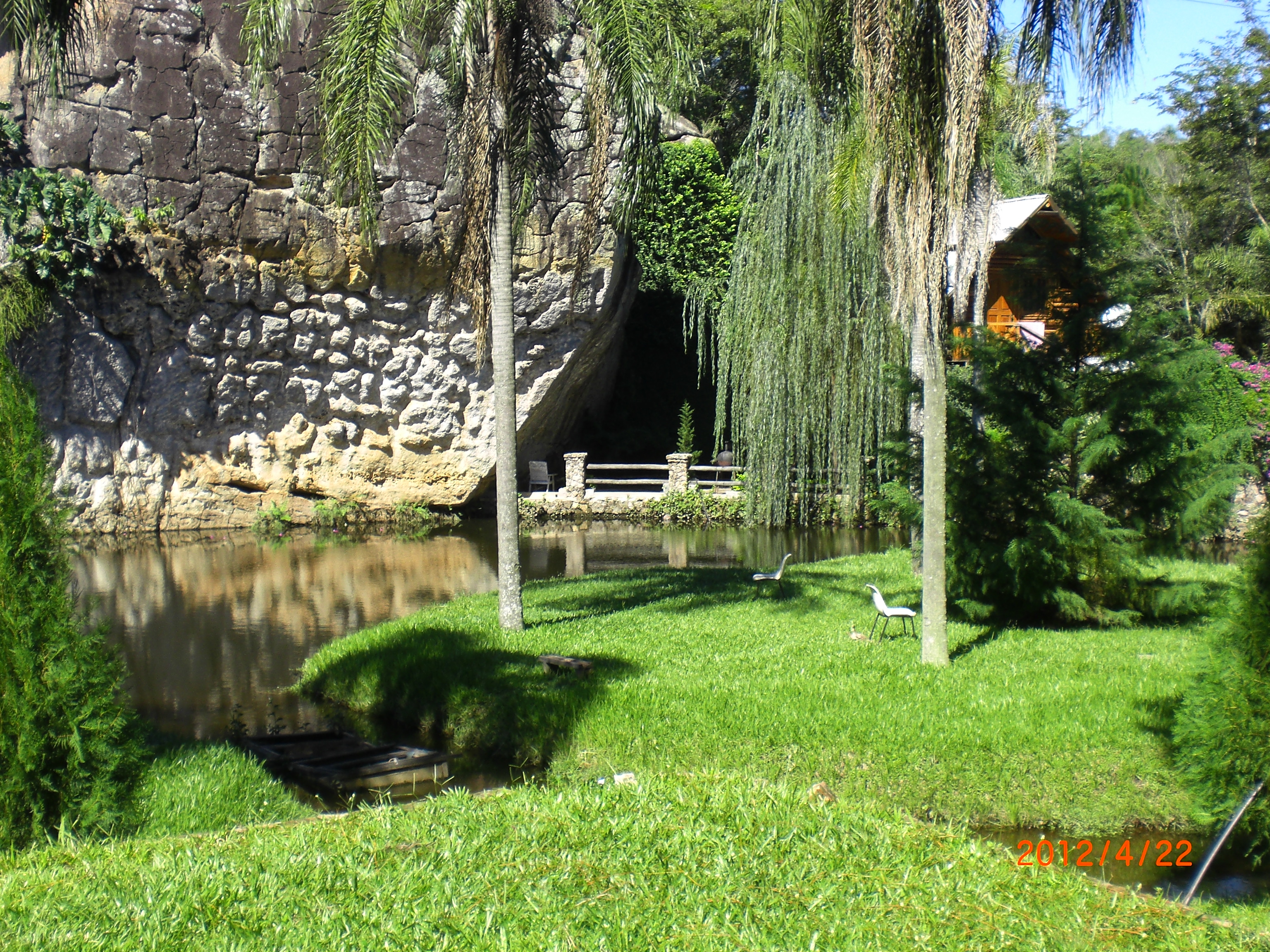
- Cabañas del Itacua, near Itacurubí de la Cordillera, Paraguay

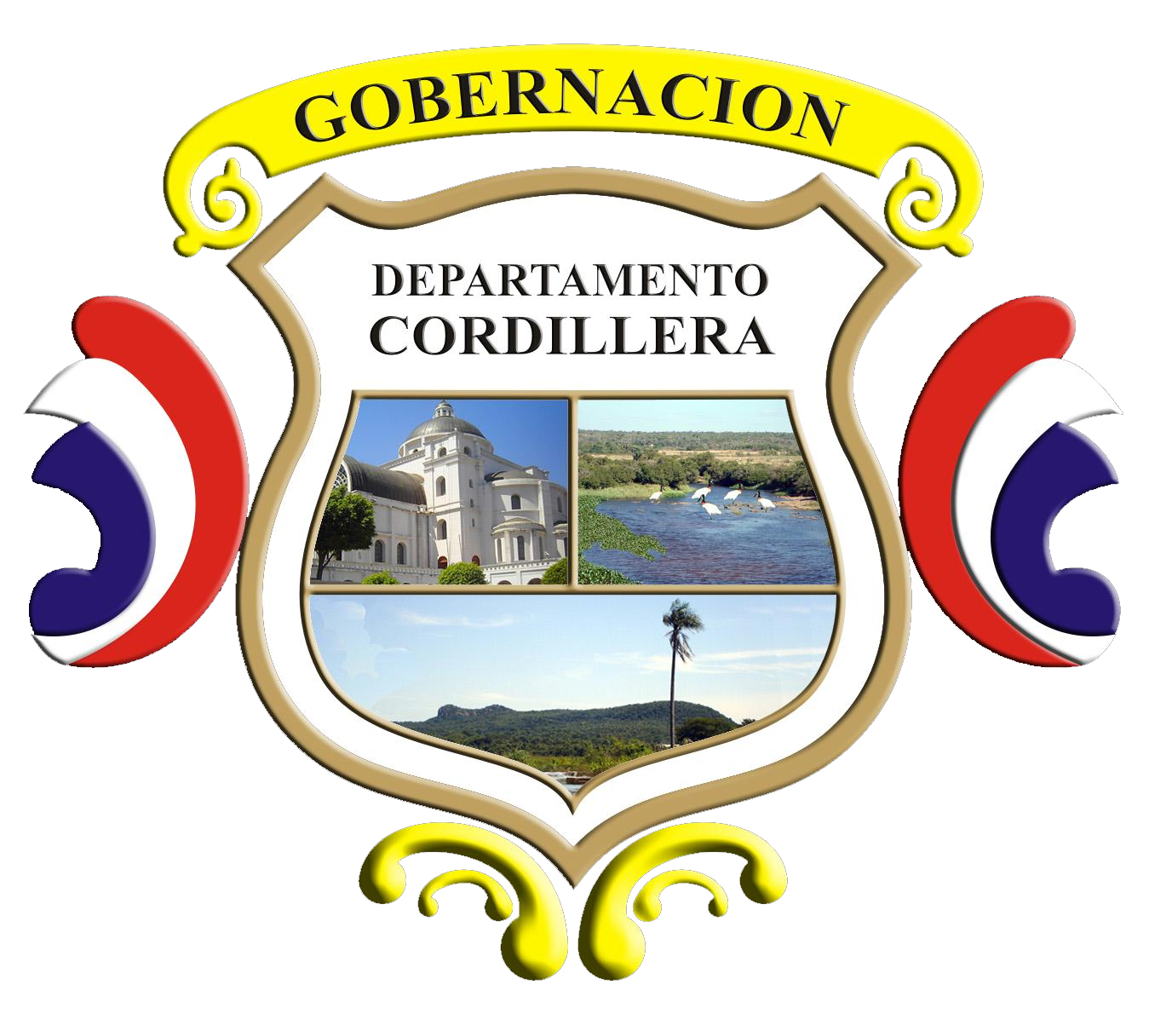
- Flag Coat of arms

- Coordinates: 25°23′S 57°08′W
- Country: Paraguay
- Capital: Caacupé

Government
  - Governor: Denis Lichi (ANR)

Area
  - Total: 4,948 km^{2} (1,910 sq mi)

Population (2022 census)
  - Total: 268,037
  - Density: 54.17/km^{2} (140.3/sq mi)
- Time zone: UTC-03 (PYT)
- ISO 3166 code: PY-3
- Number of Districts: 20

Cordillera (Spanish pronunciation: [koɾðiˈʎeɾa]) is a department in Paraguay. The capital is the city of Caacupé.

== History ==
During the seventeenth and eighteenth centuries, this area of the country went through a serious crisis due to the bellicosity of the Indians from Chaco. The villagers from Tobatí located north of the river Pirapo then called, had to migrate south for the continue attacks by Mbaye-guaicurúes. The residents of Altos and Atyrá created their current settlements in the territory of this department.

There were also some settler farmers who were scattered in existing territories Arroyos y Esteros, 1 de Marzo, Caraguatay, and Piribebuy.

Towards the end of the eighteenth century these small towns were expanding, consolidating the villages located north of the department as Arroyos y Esteros Eusebio Ayala (then called town of San Roque).

Once the Paraguayan War, began a process of founding of major towns and settlements driven by German immigrants during the government of Bernardino Caballero. Thus, in 1881 saw the founding of San Bernardino, a major tourist resort of Paraguay today.

Already in the early twentieth century, in 1906, was organized legally the country dividing the territory into departments. Thus was created the department of Caraguatay, initial name of the department of Cordillera.

In the year 1945, by a decree Law No. 9484, the department received its present name: Cordillera. Finally in 1973, by Law No. 426 took place in a new territorial reorganization and country, at which consolidates the structure of the department with its current boundaries and districts.

== Geography ==
=== Location ===
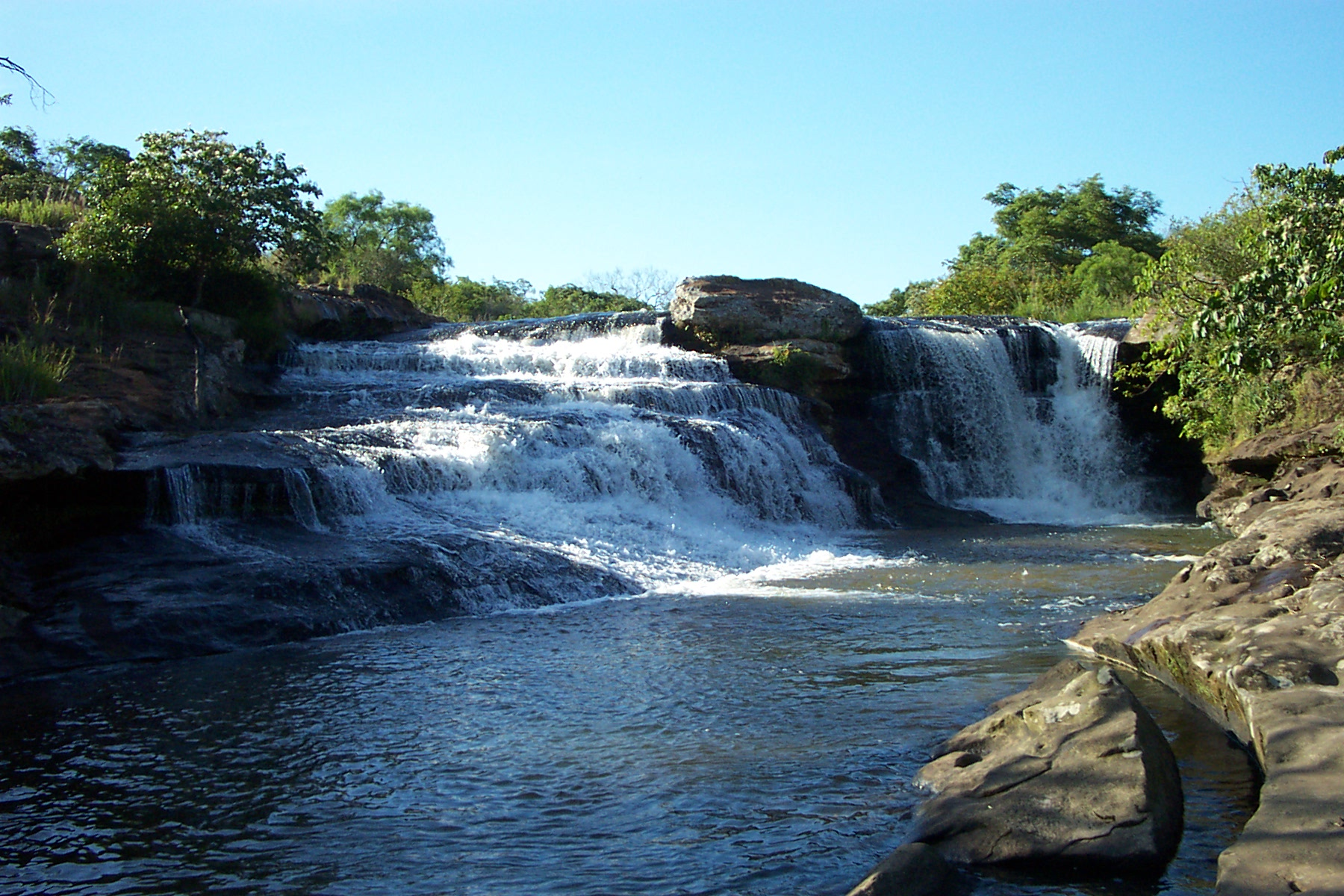
Piraretá

Cordillera Department is located between parallels 24° 50′ and 25° 35′ south latitude and the meridian 56° 30′ and 57° 27′ west.

=== Limits ===
- To the north is bordered by San Pedro Department
- To the south with Paraguarí Department
- To the southwest is bordered by Central Department
- To the east is bordered by Caaguazú Department
- To the northwest it is divided by Paraguay River from Presidente Hayes Department, located in the western region of the country.

=== Districts ===
The department is divided in 20 districts:

1. Altos
2. Arroyos y Esteros
3. Atyrá
4. Caacupé
5. Caraguatay
6. Emboscada
7. Eusebio Ayala
8. Isla Pucú
9. Itacurubí de la Cordillera
10. Juan de Mena
11. Loma Grande
12. Mbocayaty del Yhaguy
13. Nueva Colombia
14. Piribebuy
15. Primero de Marzo
16. San Bernardino
17. San José Obrero
18. Santa Elena
19. Tobatí
20. Valenzuela
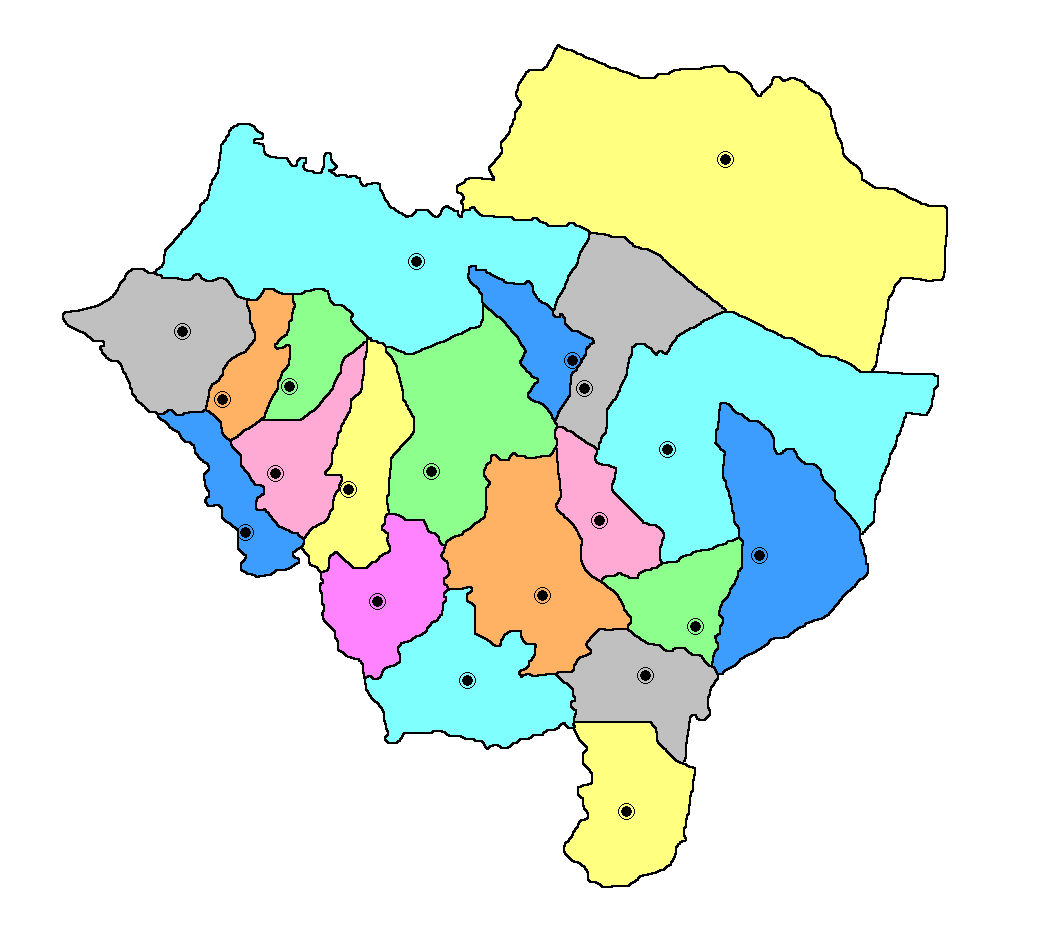

=== Capital ===
Its capital is the city of Caacupé, located atop the Cordillera de Los Altos.

It was founded on April 4, 1770 by Carlos Murphy. Its area is 150 km^{2} with a population of 35,324 inhabitants. It is 54 km distant from Asunción and is considered the "spiritual capital" of Paraguay, where La Virgen de los Milagros of Caacupé is venerated at the Basilica (the special place for the Holy Mother), where people walk on pilgrimage every year more than 1.5 million faithful, 7 and December 8.

=== Orography ===
The districts of Paraguarí, Altos and Emboscada are crisscrossed by the Cordillera de Los Altos, whose height reaches 200 metres. This ridge also crosses the districts of Piribebuy and Eusebio Ayala.

Its elevations are the most attractive hills Caacupé and Tobatí.

=== Hydrography ===
The Paraguay River runs 33 km of this department. Many areas water tributaries, such as Manduvirá River, which crosses the peoples of Piribebuy and Valenzuela. The main tributary of the river Manduvirá is Tobatiry, called in its nascent: Yhaguy River.

Other major rivers are the Piribebuy, which rises in Pirayú and empties into the Paraguay River, and Salado born in Ypacaraí. These waters flowing through a rich vegetation and is forming along the way as the waterfalls of Piribebuy, Piraretá, Chololó and others.

In this department is Lake Ypacaraí, which is formed by the waters of many streams that flow into it. It is approximately 35 km (22 mi) long, between 5 and 6 km wide, 300 meters deep and has a 90 km surface area.

=== Climate ===
It is mild and dry. The average annual temperature is 22 °C. The maximum is reached 39 °C and the minimum drops to 3 °C. Rainfall totaling 1536 mm annually, with an average of 153 mm monthly, except June and August, that only reaches 80 mm.

== Demographics ==
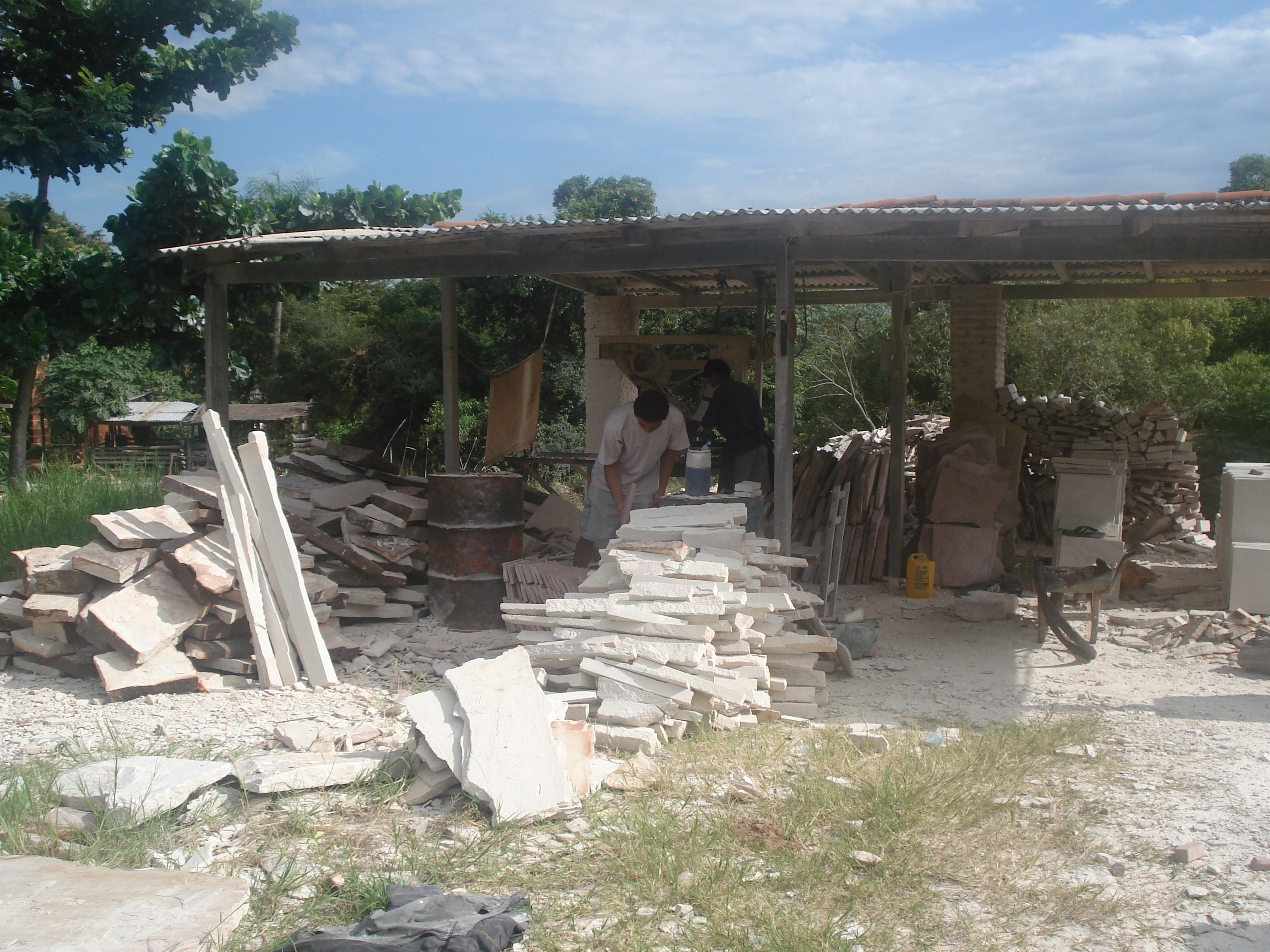
Emboscada

The department is divided into two distinct areas by presenting physical appearance. An area located to the northeast, where the terrain is presented rather flat with many estuaries suitable for the farm. The other, extended along the Cordillera de Los Altos, with flat surfaces and corrugated is satisfactory for agriculture.

== Ways and media ==
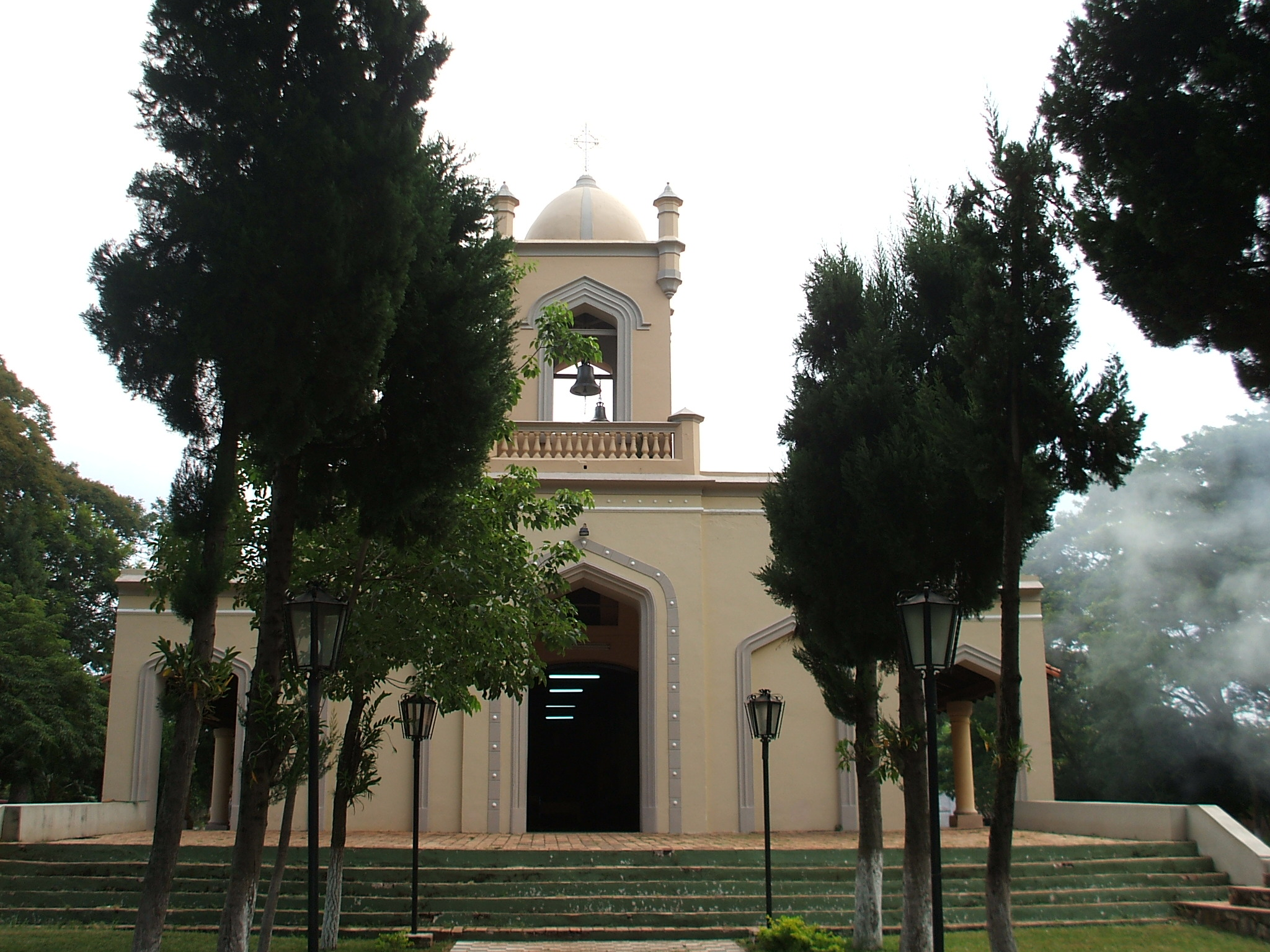
Church in the Altos district.

The main route, called the Second Marshal José Félix Estigarribia, crosses the northern department. It emerged branches and paved enripiados (road that consists of sand and small rocks). Route III "General Elizardo Aquino" crosses the department and joins it with department Concepción. The Paraguay River is navigable in this area. The districts have airfields. It has radio stations in various locations such as private issuers AM Z.P. 28 Radio the Voice of the Cordillera, three FM stations, Radio Sol, Radio Serrania and Radio Caacupé.

In Caacupé operate several institutions, such as the Governorate of the Cordillera, City Hall, Comptroller General of the Republic, Court of First Instance, Banco Nacional de Fomento, COPACO SA, ANDE, Mail, Regional Hospital, oversight of primary and secondary schools, National University, three private universities, secondary schools, primary and secondary schools, several high schools, private institutes, Paraguayan Red Cross, Lions Club, and several more institutions.

== Economy ==
The economy of Cordillera is primarily agricultural. It produces cotton, pineapple (pineapple), rice, sour orange, corn, sugarcane, banana, coffee, pepper, and strawberry, tangerine, peas, lemon and kaa he`e. There is also a producer of tomato, carrot, grapefruit, lemon, peanuts and manioc.

It also stresses the poultry production nationally and on a smaller scale, breeds cattle, pigs, sheep, horses and goats.

== Education ==
The department has institutions providing education to students from the initial level, school education and basic education Media.

== Tourism ==
Lake Ypacaraí attracts tourists to the city of San Bernardino, the main centre of the country in summer. In Caacupé and Piribebuy are the streams of Ytú and Yhaguy Guazú, Amambay, Piraretá and Siete Caídas.

Other attractions include the Museum Hassler in San Bernardino, the site where the battle was fought in Acosta Ñu in Eusebio Ayala; the Basilica and the churches of Caacupé, Altos, Piribebuy, Valenzuela and Atyrá that still retains its original Franciscan altarpiece.

The chain of hills of Altos presents ideal places to climb, the hill Caacupé, the Cristo Rey (Ecological Reserve declared educational) and the hill Cavajhu and Atyrá.

In Tobatí, the hill Tobatí is a geological formation dating from 400 to 500 million years ago. It has strange ways of rocks that have received names like Leon semi dormido (lion that almost asleep), Yvytu Silla, Gigantesco Batracio and others. It also can be accessed at Caraguatay, the place called Vapor Cué. It is the site where the boats were abandoned by Paraguayans to avoid falling into the hands of the enemy during the Paraguayan War.

The area produces a variety of handicraft products such as encaje ju (embroidery made by hand), ponchos sesenta listas (typical cloth worn in winter), embossing leather, wood and other work.
