= Arroyos y Esteros =

- District
- Location within Paraguay
- Coordinates: 25.067°S 57.100°W
- Country: Paraguay
- Department: Cordillera
- Founder: March 9 by Pedro Melo de Portugal

Government
  - Intendente Municipal: Ignacio Desiderio Bello Cazal

Area
  - Total: 533 km^{2} (206 sq mi)
- Elevation: 70 m (230 ft)

Population (2008)
  - Total: 19.001 inh.
  - Density: 37/km^{2} (96/sq mi)
- Time zone: -4 Gmt
- Postal code: 3190
- Area code: (595) (510)

Arroyos y Esteros (Spanish for Streams and Swamps) is a district of the Cordillera Department, Paraguay.

== Etymology ==
The name, Spanish for Streams and Swamps, describes the surroundings consisting of swamps and streams. It was also named Tobatí Tuyá, which is one of the rivers of this region.

Its founder, Governor Pedro de Melo de Portugal, called it "Chapel Duarte", but in 1849 Carlos Antonio López named it "Arroyos y Esteros".

== Information ==
Arroyos y Esteros is a small town, growing economically as well as in population. There are approximately 20,000 people living in the district, but these are found mostly in 13 outlying satellite communities, with only 8,000 inhabitants in the center of town. The topography can best be described in the words of the towns founder, Father Fidel Maíz, as having a lot of streams and swamps.

Once quite isolated, Arroyos now sits on the International Highway 3, which allows for rapid transit to Asunción and the possibility of round trip travel in the same day. Historically Arroyos has close ties to the larger and more prosperous Tobati, approx. 23 km to the south.

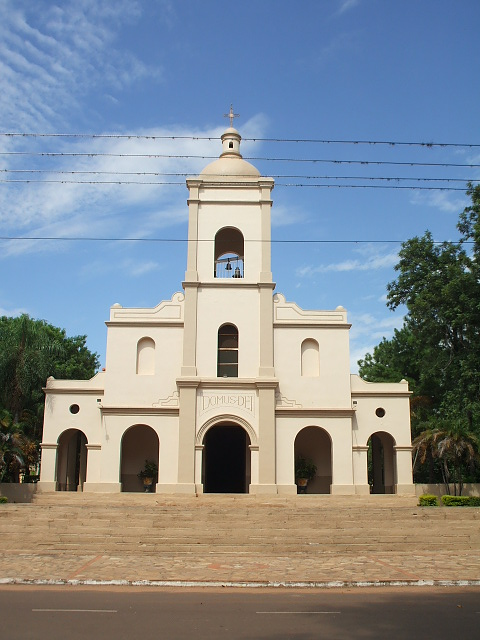
Church of Arroyos y Esteros

The principal economic activity in Arroyos y Esteros is agriculture, especially sugarcane. Pineapple and melons are other important crops. Sesame was introduced a few years ago and is slowly making inroads, despite some early crop failures. There are several large ranches in the area with cattle, and some other lesser animals (sheep, goats). The arrival of a sugar factory dedicated to producing organic sugar changed the face of the arroyense economy as many former small molasses factories shut down to deliver the raw material to the more efficient large factory.

The town's fiesta patronal is October 4- San Francisco, however each company has its own fiesta patronal, also the Foundation Day, March 9, celebration invented by the current mayor to boost tourism in Arroyos y Esteros.

Arroyos y Esteros is a city of Paraguay, it was founded in 1767 and is 67 km away from the capital city Asunción.

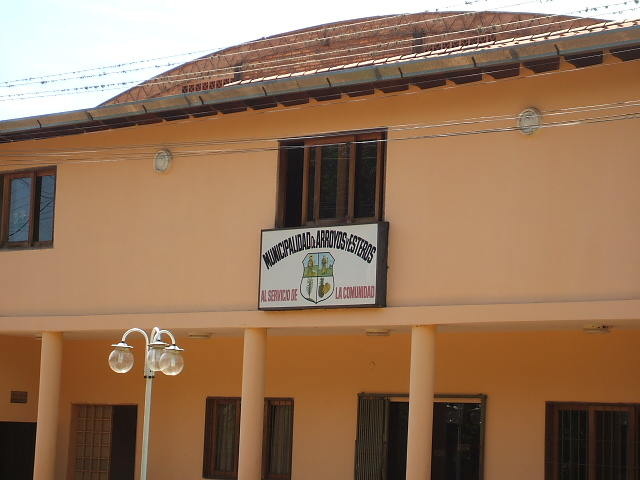
Front of the Municipality of Arroyos y Esteros

== Geography ==
The land is completely surrounded by rivers, Piribebuy and Manduvirá River, which are mouths of many swamps and streams before these important rivers flow into Paraguay River. According to a local legend, two images of the Mother Virgen were found, one of those is the one in Caacupé, the faithful capital city of Paraguay, and the other one is in Tobatí. Arroyos y Esteros is a very wealthy region in vegetation because of its privileged location.

== Climate ==
The weather is mild and dry. Temperature ranges from 23 to 27 Celsius (73.4-80.6 F) during winter 3 Celsius is the minimum.

== Demographics ==
Arroyos y Esteros has 22,723 inhabitants, of which 12,052 are men and 10,670 women, according to the census (2002). There are 2.049 people in the urban area and 16,592 in the rural area. Because of not enough job opportunities, young people migrate to search for better life conditions.

== History ==
This city was founded by the Governor Pedro de Melo de Portugal who gave the name “Capilla Duarte”, Carlos Antonio López named it “Arroyos y Esteros” in 1849. Since there is no exact date on the foundation, it was established Priest Fidel Maiz birth and death as the date the town celebrates its foundation, which is March 9.

People who live there say that when the first President, Carlos Antonio López, went to visit Priest Maíz, said to the priest: "I had to cross rivers, streams and swamps to get here", and that is the reason this city was named Arroyos y Esteros.

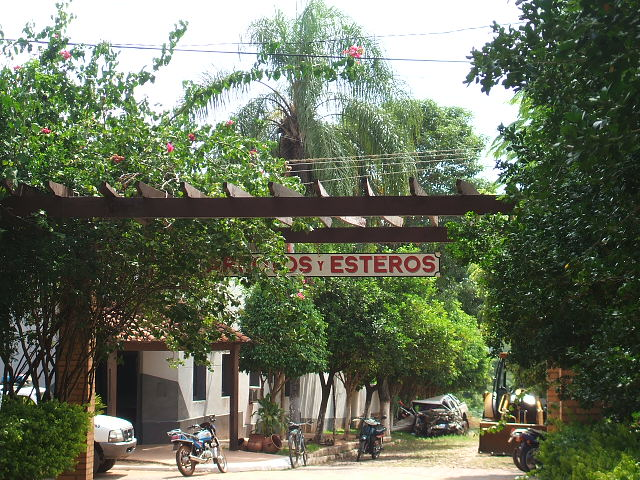
Square

== Economy ==
Arroyos y Esteros is best known as the “World's Cradle of Organic Sugar” and famous because it is the main sugar cane producer of Paraguay, honey and rum are other products gotten from the sugar cane. People also grow pineapple, banana and some other crops. The city economy is also based on cattle raising.

== Transportation ==
Route III “Gral. Elizardo Aquino” is the main way to get there. Buses from “Empresa Fidel Maiz”, which pass by Emboscada, connect the city with the capital city of Asunción. Another way to get to Arroyos y Esteros is going from Caacupe through Tobati.

== Tourism ==
There are various point of interest in and around Arroyos y Esteros: The oldest organic sugar mill in the world, OTISA and its sister company, Legado Organic Craft Distillery; and Paso Itá.

== Geography ==
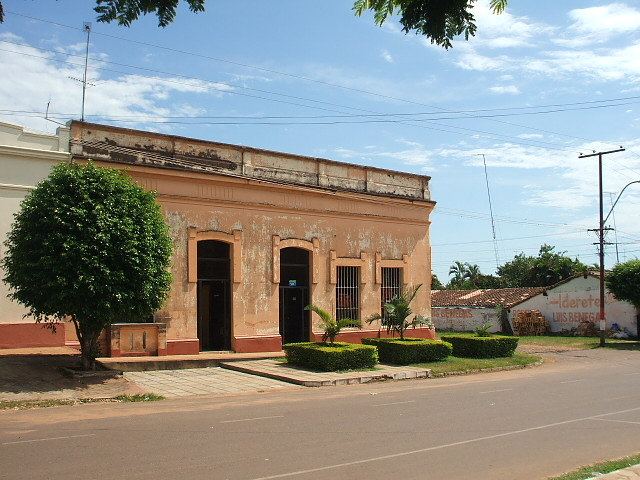
Ancient house in the city of Arroyos y Esteros

The Manduvirá and Piribebuy rivers surround the city. Nearby streams are Yhaguy, Yhú, Capiatá, Hondo and Tobatiry.

Hills include Mainumby, Ypecuá, Olivares, Lomas de Acevedo and Cordillera de los Altos.

== Important People from Arroyos y Esteros ==
Father Fidel Maíz, was born in Arroyos y Esteros and was a very important character during the War of the Triple Alliance.

== Bibliography and references ==
- Geografía Ilustrada del Paraguay, Distribuidora Arami SRL; 2007. ISBN 99925-68-04-6
- Geografía del Paraguay, Primera Edición 1999, Editorial Hispana Paraguay SRL
