= Santa Elena, Paraguay =

Coordinates: 25°24′S 56°48′W

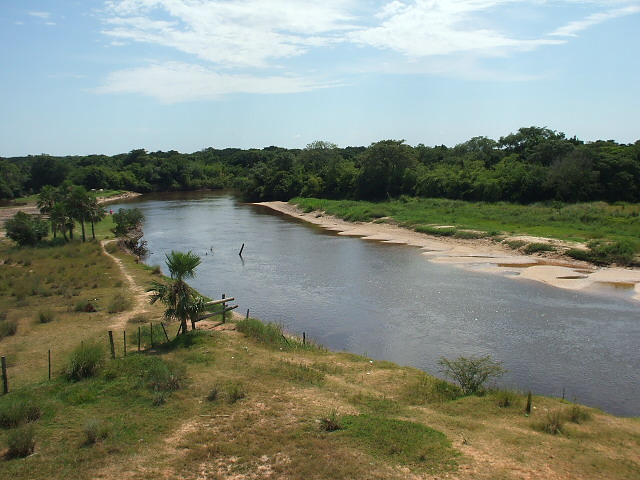

Santa Elena, named so because one of its first colonizers bore the name Elena, is a district of the Cordillera Department, Paraguay.
