= Nueva Colombia District =

Coordinates: 25°10′47″S 57°21′00″W

- District
- Interactive map of Nueva Colombia District
- Country: Paraguay
- Department: Cordillera

Area
  - Water: 80.02 km^{2} (30.90 sq mi)

Population (2022)
  - Total: 4,602

Nueva Colombia is a distrito in the Cordillera Department of Paraguay. It occupies an area of 80.02 km^{2} (30.90 sq mi). As per the 2022 census, it had a population of 4,602 individuals. It was officially established on 23 June 1955.

== History ==
Nueva Colombia was formerly part of the Altos District. An Economic and Administrative Board was established in 1919, with some autonomous powers to govern the settlement. It was formed as a colony in 1922 and was established as a district by Law No. 260 on 23 June 1955.

The name which means "New Colombia", was given as a sign of its relationship with Colombia. The streets are often lined with Paraguayan and Colombian flags.

== Geography ==
Nueva Colombia is a district located in the Cordillera Department in Paraguay. It occupies an area of 881 km^{2} (340 sq mi). It is located about 43 km (27 mi) from the Paraguayan capital of Asunción. The district is divided into seven companies. It borders Loma Grande and Altos to the east, Emboscada to the west, and San Bernardino to the south.

It is located at an elevation of 121.81 m (399.6 ft) above sea level. The district has a tropical savanna climate (Köppen climate classification: Aw). The average annual temperature is 27.74 °C (81.93 °F). The district receives an average annual rainfall of 16.21 cm (6.38 in) and has 142.32 rainy days in a year.

== Demographics ==
As per the 2022 census, Nueva Colombia district had a population of 4,602 inhabitants of which 2,392 were males and 2,210 were females. About 73.5% of the population was classified rural, and the rest (26.5%) lived in urban areas. About 22.8% of the population was below the age of fourteen, and 11.6% was more than 65 years of age.
