= Itacurubí de la Cordillera =

Itacurubí de la Cordillera Itakurubi de la Cordillera
- Interactive map of Itacurubí de la Cordillera
- Coordinates: 25°27′0″S 56°51′0″W
- Country: Paraguay
- Department: Cordillera
- Founded: September 18, 1871

Government
  - Intendente Municipal: Carmela Manuel Gonzalez Almada

Area
  - Total: 262 km^{2} (101 sq mi)
- Elevation: 155 m (509 ft)

Population (2022)
  - Total: 8,961
  - Density: 34.2/km^{2} (88.6/sq mi)
- Time zone: -4 Gmt
- Postal code: 3080
- Area code: (595) (518)
- Website: http://mitacurubi.gov.py/

Itacurubí de la Cordillera (Guarani: Itakurubi de la Cordillera) is a town in the Cordillera Department of Paraguay, located 92 km of Asunción.

== Etymology ==
Its name means Itacurubí Guarani Itakuruvi, 'crushed rock.'

== Weather ==
The climate in the department of Cordillera is warm and dry. The average temperature is 22 °C, the highest in summer and 39 degrees minimum in winter, grade 3.

== History ==
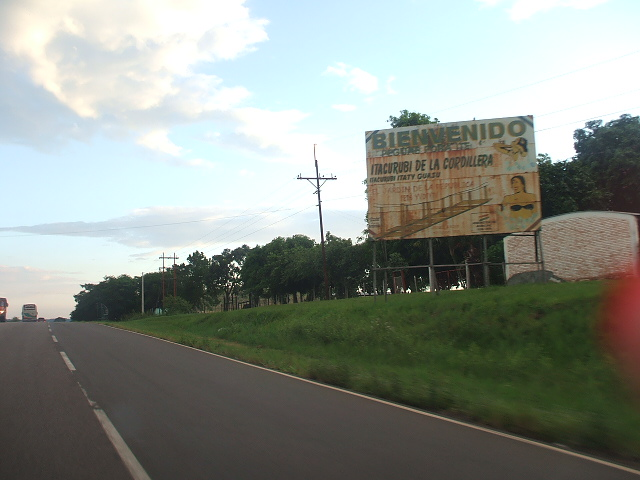
Entrance to the city

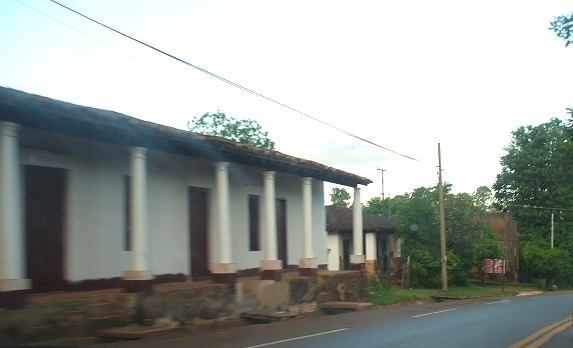
Casona in Itacurubí

Founded on September 18, 1871 by residents of the area, named "Aguilera", is also known as "Garden of the Cordillera."

He was formerly a place of recreation and entertainment for Asuncenos.

The patronal feast is celebrated on 8 October, in honor of Nuestra Señora del Rosario, patron of the city. Currently, there are a popular movement for its inhabitants to the official date of the founding of this city is on 7 October 1871, saw no objective evidence of the exact date of its founding.

== Economy ==
Residents of Itacurubí engaged in agriculture, there are small factories honey cane.

In addition, among the crafts include pottery, crochet, making quilts and poyvi.

== Transportation ==
Access to the city of Itacurubí dela Cordillera by Route II "Mcal. José Félix Estigarribia."

== Tourism ==
Approximately 1km from the city centre, along the Yhagüy River, is the Grotto Itá Koty (which in Guarani means "stone room").

Throughout the area there are numerous spas.

Itacurubí of the Cordillera has become a place of tourist attraction for domestic and international under the various resorts on the Yhagüy River which, in Guarani, means "water under the shade". It is that indeed the Yhagüy, approximately 85% of their journey, it does so under leafy trees in a natural forest. Likewise, the Yhagüy River slips Mans its crystalline waters on fine white sand and clear 500 meters from the city centre. Its inhabitants, "itacurubienses", are accustomed to the presence of tourists.

== Notable people ==
- Blas Cáceres, footballer

== Sources ==
- World Gazeteer: Paraguay – World-Gazetteer.com
- Secretaria Nacional de Turismo
