= Isla Pucú =

Isla Pucú Ka'aguy Juru
- Location within Paraguay
- Coordinates: 25°18′0″S 56°54′0″W
- Country: Paraguay
- Department: Cordillera

Population (2008)
  - Total: 1,573
- Area code: 0525

Isla Pucú is a small town and district in the Cordillera Department of Paraguay. Its people are usually farmers. Technology is taking place rapidly and it is getting to be a more sophisticated place, because many of the young people are migrating to North America and Spain, to help their families economically.
