= Tobatí =

Coordinates: 25°16′S 57°19′W

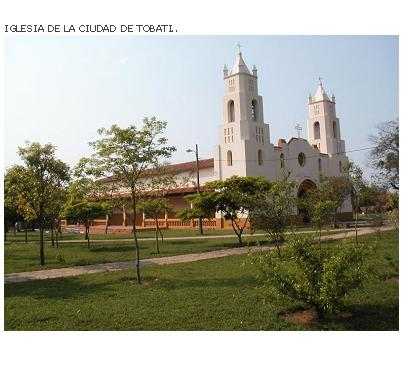
- Interactive map of Tobatí

Population
  - Total: 9,688

Tobatí is a city in Tobatí District in the Cordillera Department, Paraguay.

== History ==
Tobati was founded in June 1539 by Domingo Martínez de Irala. Opinions vary as to the meaning of the town's name. One is from the Spanish definition of the word, referring to the rocky terrain, consisting largely of limestone. Another is that it is a portmanteau of the Guarani language words "tova", meaning "face" and "tí", meaning "nose", or together - "nose on the face". A third option is that the name is a combination of the Guarani words, tova, and morotí - referring to an indigenous legend of a white faced warrior priest who would come to lead the tribes into a glorious era.

One of the greatest heroes in Paraguayan history, the "Liberator of Paraguay", Captain Pedro Juan Caballero hailed from Aparypy, Tobati. Captain Caballero was the leader of the Paraguayan War for Independence from Spain, and was known as a military tactician. Caballero continued to serve his country after the war as a member of the governing Junta of Paraguay until the ascension of the "Perpetual Dictator", Doctor José Gaspar Rodríguez de Francia.

Tobati was the subject of two sociological studies. The first is titled, Tobati: A Paraguayan Town, by Helen and Elman Service. The second is titled Tobati : tradicion y cambio en un pueblo paraguayo, by Diego Hay.

== Religion ==
Like most Paraguayan towns, Tobatí is predominately Roman Catholic. Small Evangelical, Baptist, and Jehovah's Witnesses communities worship in the town. The town is divided into Barrios, generally named after Saints. Feast days of the Saints are celebrated in their respective Barrios as neighborhood events. The religious life of the town centers around the feast day of Mary of the Immaculate Conception, the Patron Saint of Tobatí, on December 8.

The church in Tobatí contains a holy relic carving of the Virgin Mary of Immaculate Conception, which was carved by an indigenous convert hundreds of years ago. This Indian was pursued by his tribe to be put to death for his conversion to Christianity. As he hid behind a tree the Indian prayed to the Holy Mother for protection in return for his devotion and promise to create an icon to glorify her. The tribe passed him unnoticed and he subsequently carved two statues of the Holy Virgin. One resides in the church in Tobati, and the other in the Basilica in neighboring Caacupe.

== Culture and artwork ==
Tobatí is renowned throughout Paraguay for woodworking, ceramics, and sculptures of its artisans. Don Zenón Páez is world-renowned.

== Economy ==
The major industry in Tobatí is the production of building materials. The majority of roofing tiles and bricks supplying Paraguay originate in Tobati. Additionally, much of Tobateño production is exported to Argentina and Brazil. While some factories are modern and run electric machines and kilns, and others mix modern and traditional methods, the vast majority are traditional operations. First, clay is milled in wooden churns powered by horses or mules walking in circles around the mill. Workers then form tiles and bricks in molds and place them in the sun to dry. In the final step the products are cooked in wood fired kilns for 24+ hours.

== Team Tobati ==
Each year, a community service trip consisting of approximately 100 students from Kingswood Oxford School in West Hartford, Connecticut travel to Tobatí. Teacher Ron Garcia organized the group. His family is from Tobatí and he has many family members in the town. Team Tobati sends students and health care professionals each year over spring break to work with villages in providing health care and education. The group sends smaller contingents of students and medical professionals at various times during the year. Additionally, Team Tobati funded an artisan village and an educational institute.
