= Altos, Paraguay =

Altos
- City and district
- San Lorenzo de la Cordillera de los Altos
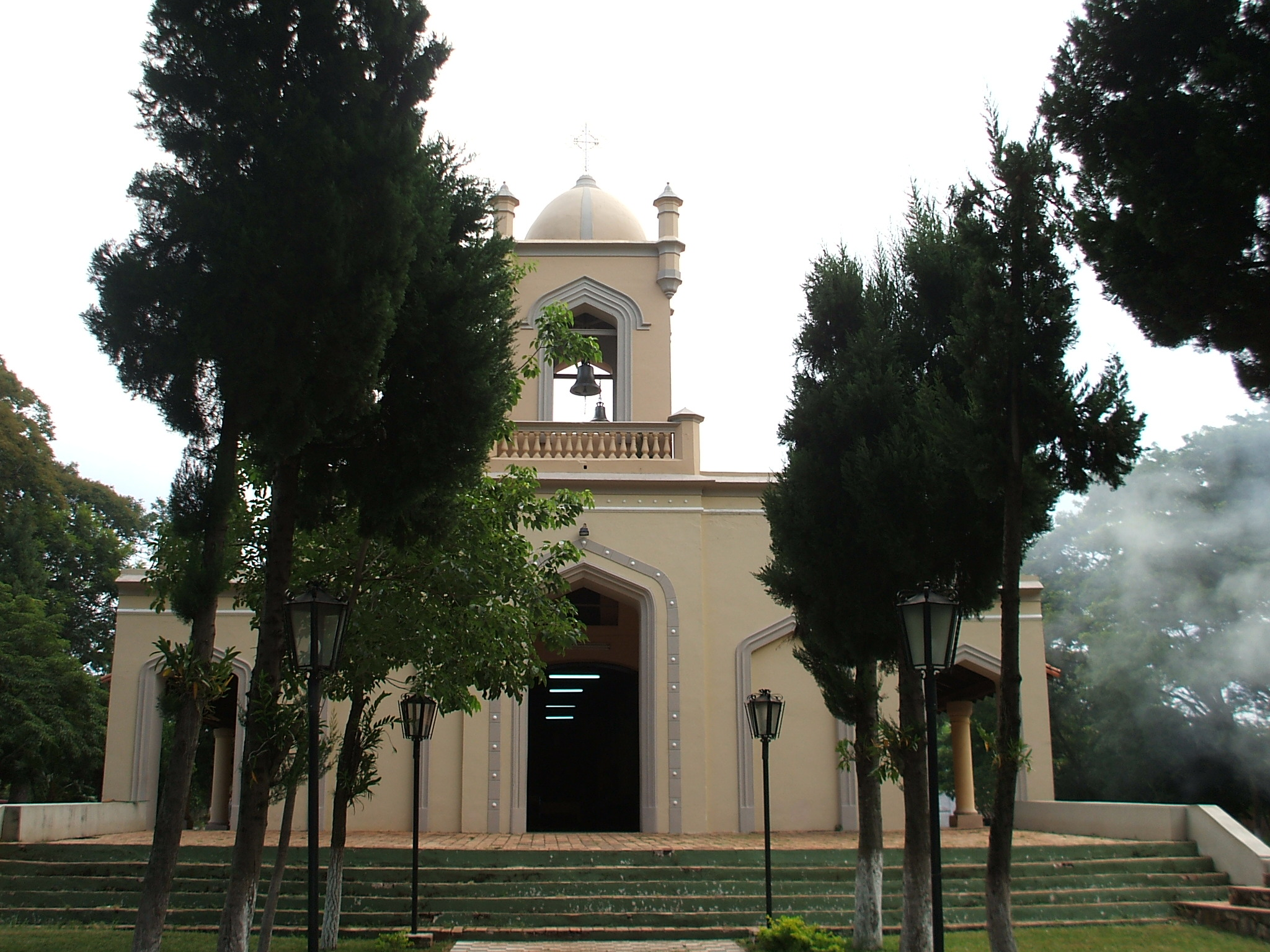
- Church of Altos, Paraguay

- Location within Paraguay
- Coordinates: 25°14′0″S 57°15′0″W
- Country: Paraguay
- Department: Cordillera
- Founded: August 10, 1538

Government
  - Intendente municipal: Juan Félix Ramírez Ruíz (2015-2020)

Area
  - Total: 92 km^{2} (36 sq mi)
- Elevation: 207 m (679 ft)

Population (2008)
  - Total: 13,114
  - Density: 73/km^{2} (190/sq mi)
- Time zone: -4 Gmt
- Postal code: 3240
- Area code: 0512

Altos is a city and district of the Cordillera Department, Paraguay. Situated approximately 60 kilometers east of the capital, Asunción, the city rests on the elevated terrain of the Cordillera de los Altos mountain range. Because of its high altitude and panoramic views overlooking Lake Ypacaraí, it is widely known by the local nickname "La Terraza del País" (The Terrace of the Country).

== Etymology ==
It is also called "Altos de Ybypytaré", which in Guaraní means "path of the wind", previously called "San Lorenzo de la Cordillera de los Altos".

== Climate ==
The climate in this department is mild and dry. The average temperature is 22 °C, in summer reaches 39 °C and in winter drops to 3 °C.

== Demographics ==
Altos' population is 14,641 in total, 7,470 men and 7,171 women, according to the 2022 census.

== History ==
Altos is one of the oldest cities of Paraguay.

There are two versions of its foundation. The first tells that Domingo Martínez de Irala founded it on August 10, 1538. The second one claims that Friar Luis de Bolaños founded it in 1580, with the distinction of being the first of many reducciónes (Roman Catholic missions) of the Guaraní people in Paraguay. The first German settlers arrived in Altos in 1879/80.

Around 1882, the first German language classes were held for the children of German immigrants in a private home.

Marshal José Félix Estigarribia's fatal plane crash was near the city of Altos, by the Aguaí Stream. This occurred the 7th of September, 1940.

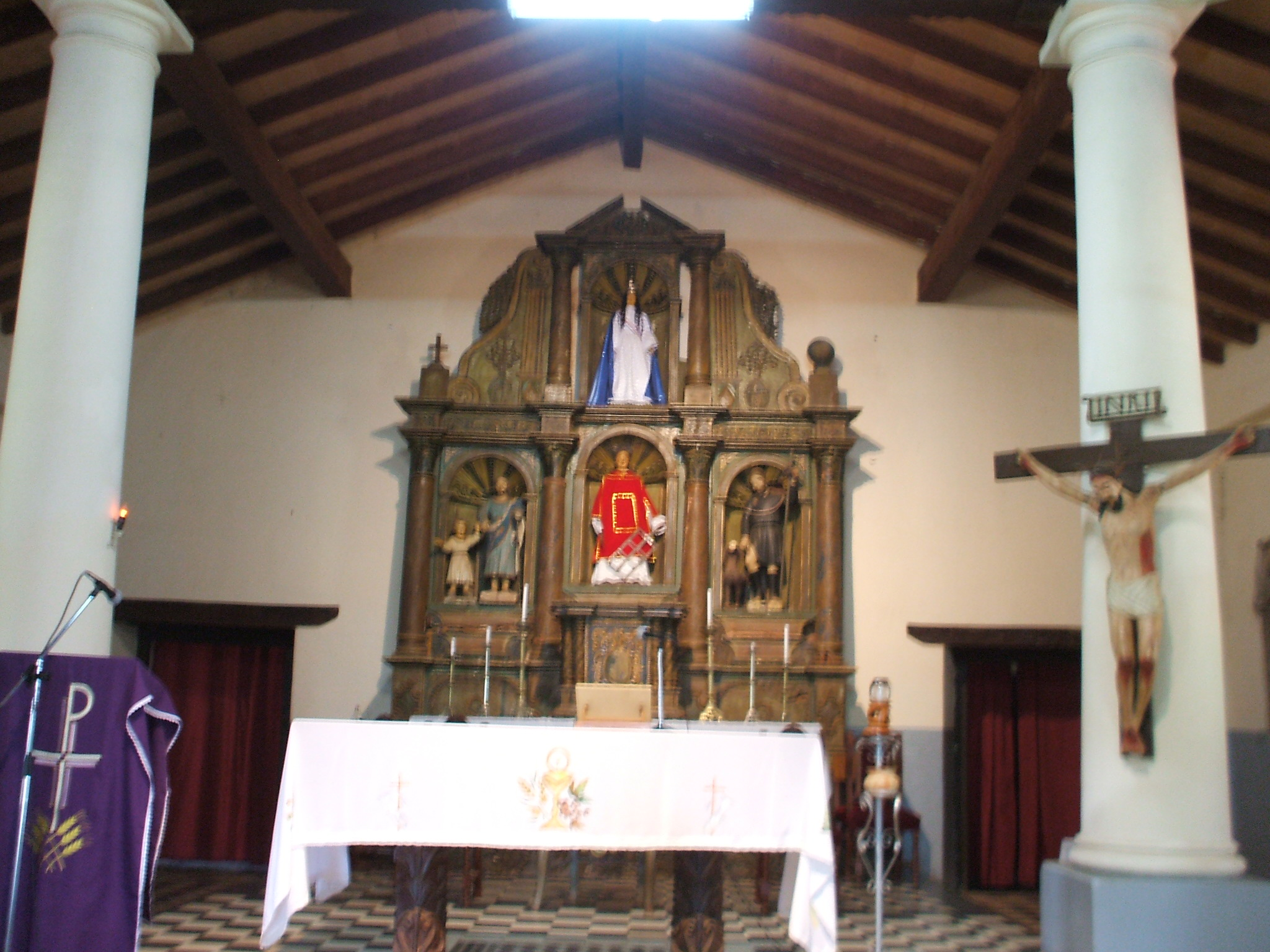
Atrium of the Church of Altos

It was the hiding place of Joseph Mengele, a notorious Nazi scientist and medical doctor, who experimented in the Nazi concentration camps. Mengele and his wife flew to Altos in 1959, after the government of West Germany discovered their home in Buenos Aires, Argentina, and he received the notification for arrest. His wife did not adapt to this new life and left him. In 1960, he panicked after hearing news of the interest of the Nazi hunter in his capture, and with kidnapping of Adolf Eichmann, left Altos to go to Hohenau in the South of Paraguay.

== Economy ==
Historically, Altos was known for the cultivation of medicinal plants and coffee, alongside general agriculture, woodworking, and cattle ranching. While local coffee harvesting ceased by 2024, the processing and commercialization of coffee remain active industries in the town.

The local hospitality sector, characterized by its traditional inns, attracts both domestic and international tourists drawn to the region's natural streams and hills. Reflecting its growing tourism profile, Altos was recently nominated for the UN Tourism "Best Tourism Villages" initiative.

== Tourism ==
The local church dates back to the era of the Jesuit missions and is dedicated to the city's patron saint, San Lorenzo (Saint Lawrence). It is situated in Heroes' Square (Plaza de los Héroes) in the city center.

A prominent local handicraft is the carving of timbó wood into the shapes of animals, mythological figures, and masks, which are subsequently painted in vibrant colors. These masks, known as kamba ra'anga (representing people of African descent), are traditionally used to reenact historical battles between the kambá and the Guaycurú peoples. This colonial-era tradition takes place during the festivities of Saint Peter and Saint Paul, held on June 28 and 29 in the community of Itaguazú, located 2 kilometers from Altos. The celebrations also feature traditional games and regional cuisine.

The route to access the city provides a view of the Ypacaraí Lake and the exuberant vegetation surrounding it. The municipality operates "The Tukanga Route," an eco-tourism trail named for the area's abundant toucan population, set within a region recognized for its natural resources.

There is also the Saldivar Stream, located in a natural reserve with more than 4 hectares, 8 kilometers from the center of city.

The farm "El Gaucho" has 4 hectares of abundant vegetation, with modern and comfortable amenities that recreate colonial times.

The rural hotel "La Grappa" offers visitors the natural environment of the mountainous region, in addition to nighttime celebrations of Paraguayan and Latin American folklore.

== People from Altos ==
Altos is the hometown of the internationally renowned artist Luis Alberto del Paraná. His house is located in the historical area of the city.
