= Caraguatay, Paraguay =

Caraguatay Karaguatay
- Caraguatay
- Location within Paraguay
- Coordinates: 25°14′0″S 56°49′0″W
- Country: Paraguay
- Department: Cordillera
- Founded: 24 September 1770

Government
  - Intendente municipal: Jesús Salvador Torres Martínez

Area
  - Total: 91 km^{2} (35 sq mi)
- Elevation: 71 m (233 ft)

Population
  - Total: 11,568
- Postal code: 3150
- Area code: (595) (517)

Caraguatay (Spanish pronunciation: [kaɾaɣwaˈtaj], Guarani: Karaguatay) is a distrito and town located in the Vapor Cué region of the Cordillera Department in Paraguay. The livelihood of most citizens includes farming, fishing, and local trading.

== Climate ==
The climate in this department is mild and dry. The average temperature is 22 °C. Summer temperatures reach 39 °C and in winter drops to 3 °C.

== Demography ==
The 2002 census recorded a population of 11,568, including 6,045 men and 5,523 women, at Caraguatay.

Many of its inhabitants traveled to the United States to work, and send remittances to their families. Building work in the city shows the great investment that this income provided.

== History ==
A Spanish family Franco founded the city on 24 September 1770, during the governorate of Carlos Morphi, on the banks of Yhaguy River. This locality was previously called Puesto Mbocajaty and included the areas of Iriarte, Ybyraity, and Yeguarizo.

It is one of the oldest localities of the country. It possesses a beautiful colonial architecture, with well-cared-for gardens and streets.

== Economy ==
Employment is focused on agriculture and cattle. Many of its people have gone to work in other countries, especially the United States, and the remittances provide the greatest city income.

== Tourism ==
The foundation of the city on 24 September, coincides with the patron saint's festivities of the Virgen De Las Mercedes, in which are organized official, liturgical and student events, in addition to musical and dancing festivals. Celebrations are also held on 14 May, the day of Saint Francis Labrador.

President Francisco Solano López and Eliza Lynch used to live in a house in Caraguatay, the house of the Miranda family, before moving to San Estanislao.

The Ykuá Ramírez was a camp for Paraguayan troops during the War of 1870.

Close to the city centre and beside the Yhaguy River is the "Vapor Cué National Park", an open-air museum where the remains of six ships of the Paraguayan forces that participated in the War of 1870 are exhibited. The ships, Anhambay, Paraná, Pirabebé/Piravevé, Rio Apa, Salto del Guairá and Yporá, were set on fire and sunk towards the end of the war to deny them to the enemy. Beginning in 1978, their remains were recovered and are now displayed, partly restored, alongside other objects, flags and photographs from their time.

== How to get there ==
Caraguatay is 91 kilometers from Asunción, taking the Route number 2. In the center of Eusebio Ayala, 65 kilometers from Asunción, there is a deviation to the north, which leads to Caraguatay and other cities.

In Asunción, from the central bus station, there are several buses that go to Caraguatay.

== People from Caraguatay ==
Three Paraguayan presidents were born in Caraguatay:

- Juan Antonio Escurra (1859–1919)
- Emiliano González Navero (1861–1940)
- José Félix Estigarribia (1888–1940)

Others personalities:

- José del Rosario Miranda, Vice President from 1886 to 1890

== Gallery ==
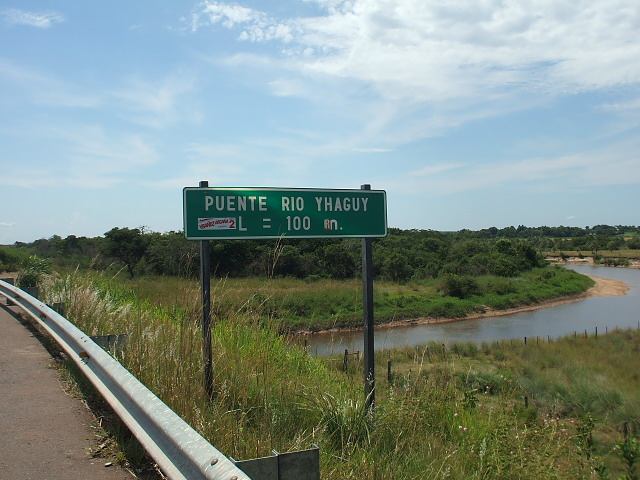
A bridge over the Yhaguy river

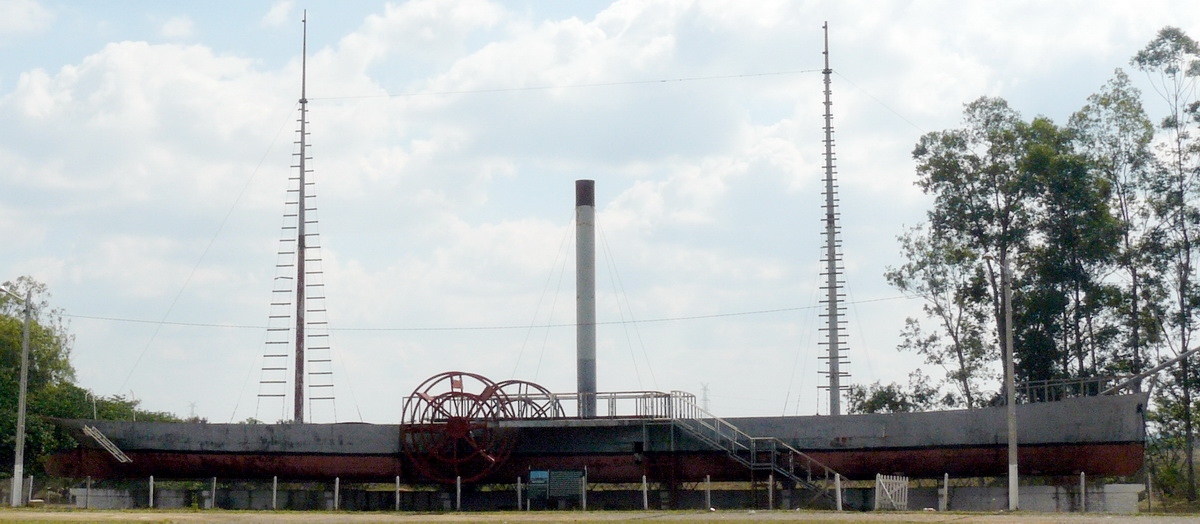
Steamer Anhambay in Vapor Cué National Park
