= Caacupé =

Caacupé Ka'akupe
- City and district
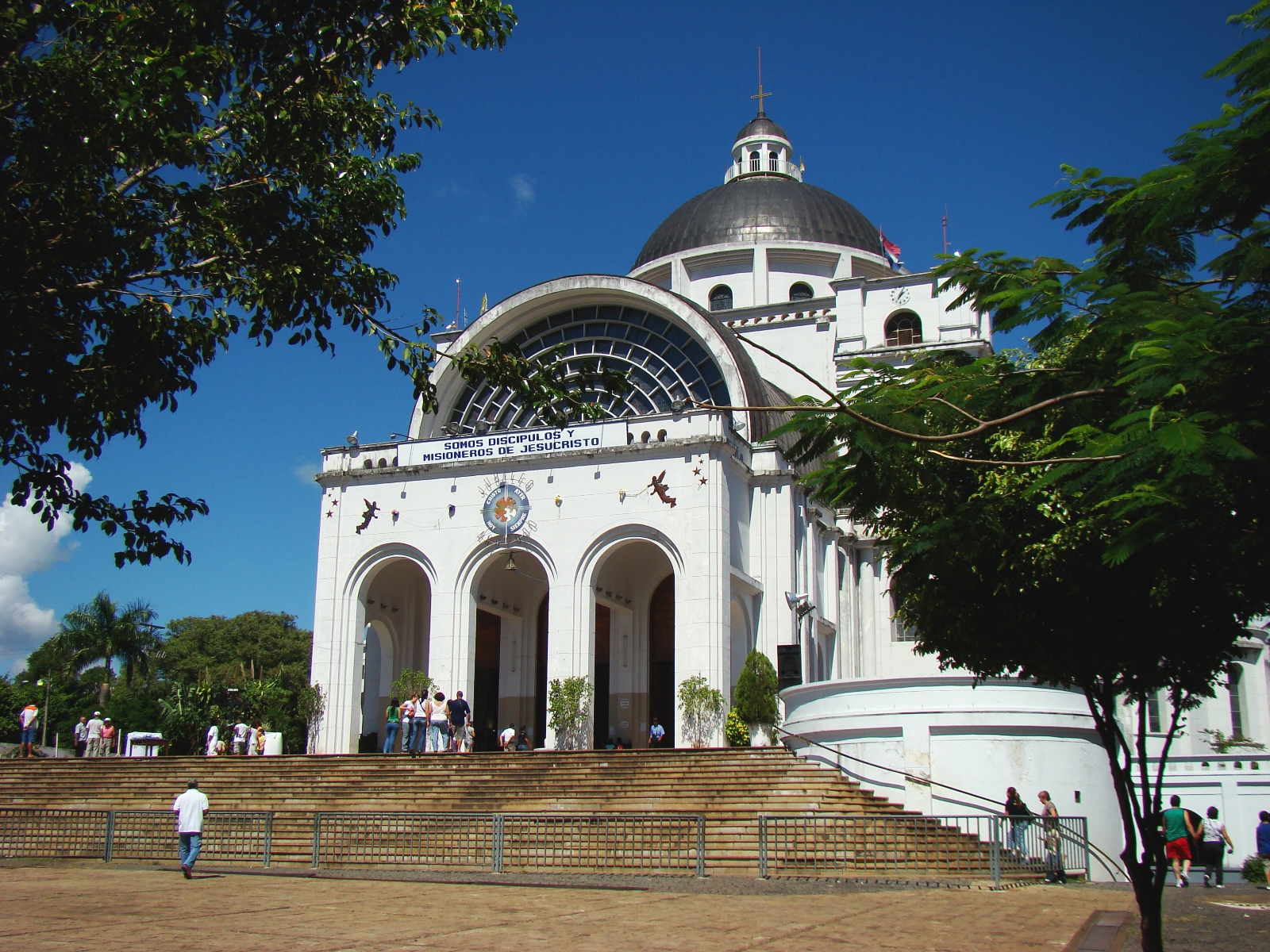
- Basilica of Caacupé, Paraguay

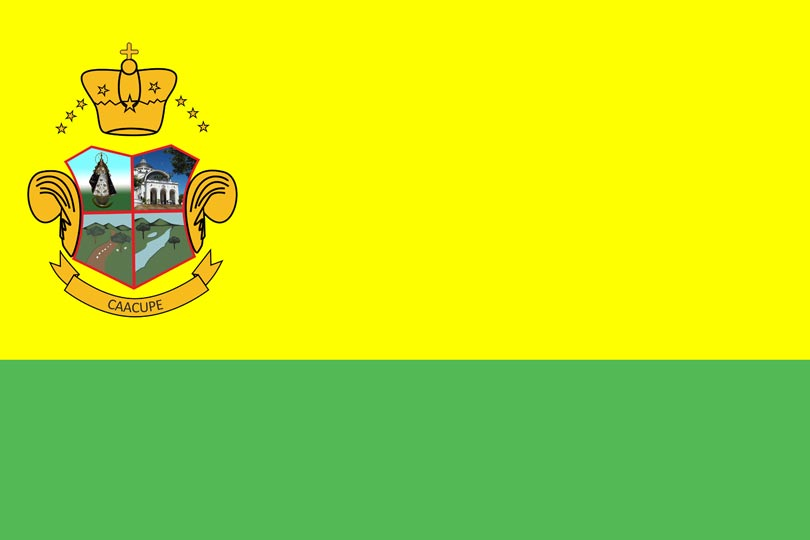
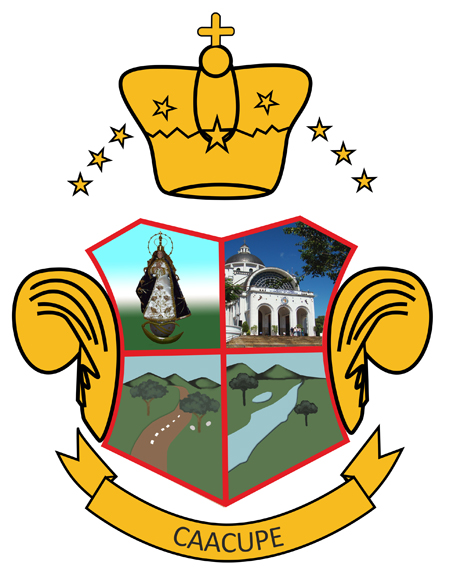
- Flag Coat of arms

- Location in Paraguay
- Coordinates: 25°23′10″S 57°08′27″W
- Country: Paraguay
- Department: Cordillera

Government
  - Mayor: Diego Armando Riveros Gonzalez

Area
  - Total: 145 km^{2} (56 sq mi)

Population (2019)
  - Total: 56,864
  - Density: 392/km^{2} (1,020/sq mi)
- Time zone: UTC-03 (PYT)
- Postal code: 3000
- Area code: +595 (511)

Caacupé (Spanish pronunciation: [ka(a)kuˈpe]; Guarani: Ka'akupe, Guarani pronunciation: [kaʔakuˈpe], 'Behind the Mount') is a city and district in Paraguay. It is the capital of the department of Cordillera.

The town was founded in 1770 by Carlos Murphy, a grenadier in the service of King Charles III of Spain, although a settlement existed here from the 17th century.

The city is the seat of the Roman Catholic Diocese of Caacupé. Caacupé is best known as the site of The Virgin of Caacupé, Saint Patron of Paraguay. The Cathedral Basilica of Our Lady of Miracles, Caacupé stands in the centre of the town. A major religious festival is held annually on 8 December in honour of the statuette "Our Lady of the Miracles". This statuette, carved in the 16th century by a devout convert, was miraculously saved from a great flood, and numerous miracles are ascribed to it.

During the rest of the year Caacupé is a quiet provincial town. It has a park with amusements.

== Gallery ==
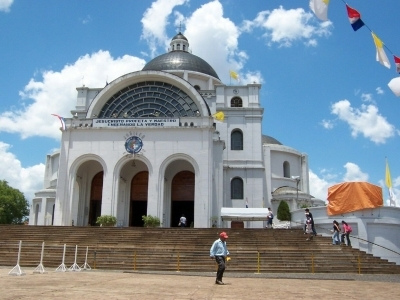
Basilica of Caácupe

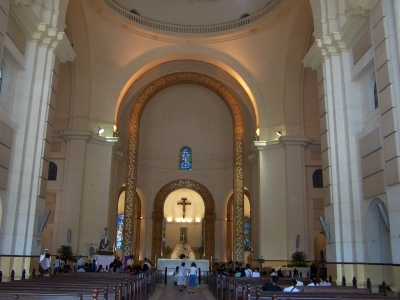
Inside view of the basilica.

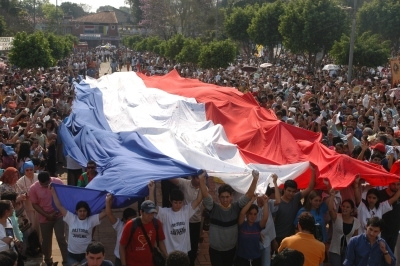
Pilgrims

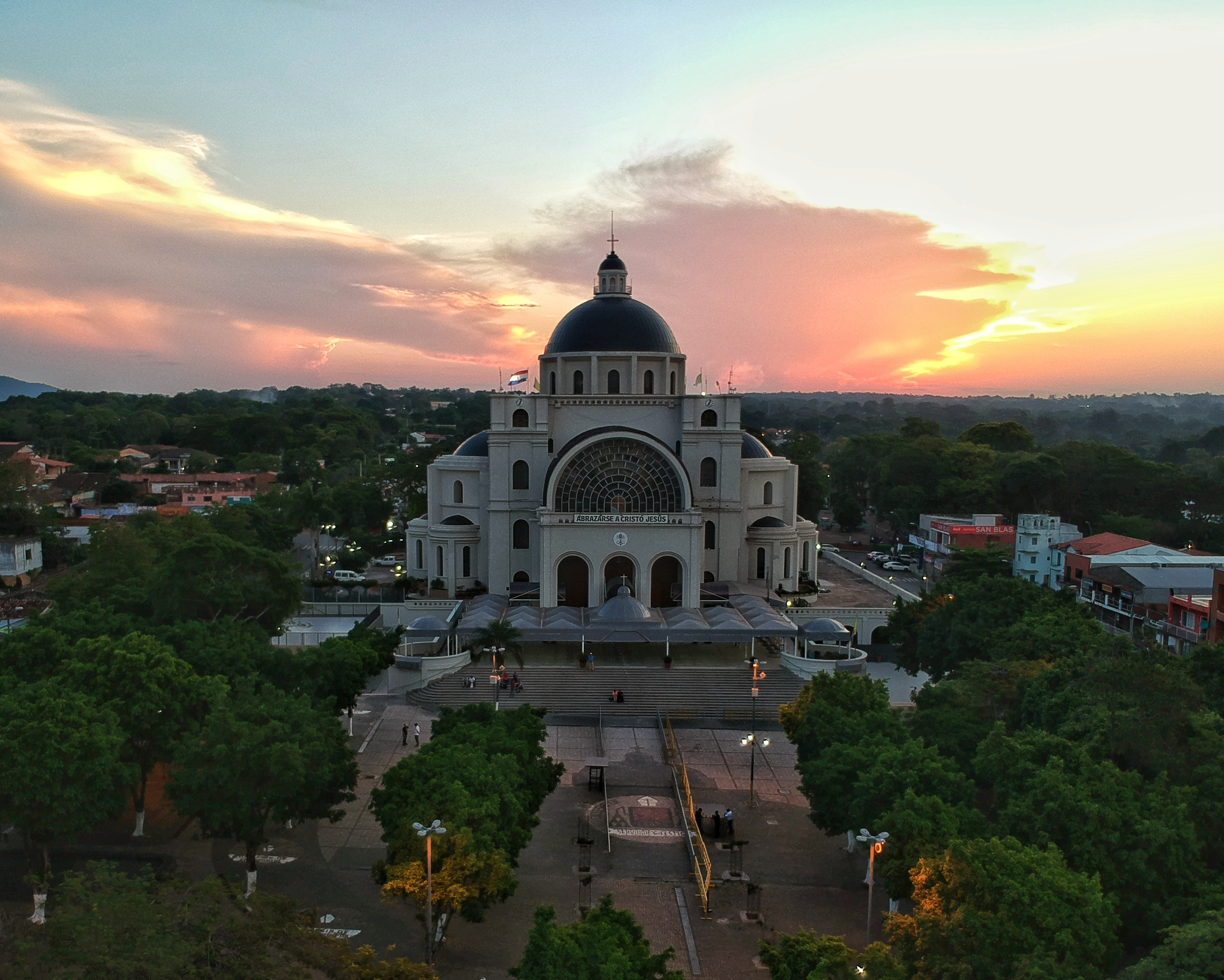
Aerial Panoramic view of Basílica de Caacupé

== External list ==
- Official website
