= Cerro Corá =

Cerro Corá may refer to:

== Argentina ==
- Cerro Corá, Misiones

== Brazil ==
- Cerro Corá, Rio Grande do Norte

== Paraguay ==
- Cerro Corá (hill)
- Battle of Cerro Corá, 1870
- Cerro Corá, Alto Paraguay
- Cerro Corá, Amambay
- Cerro Corá National Park
- Cerro Cora (film)
- Club Cerro Corá, a football team
