= Cerro Corá, Amambay =

Cerro Corá Yvyty Kora (Guarani)
- City and district
- Location within Paraguay
- Coordinates: 22°37′00″S 55°59′00″W
- Country: Paraguay
- Department: Amambay
- District: Pedro Juan Caballero
- Time zone: UTC-03 (PYT)
- Climate: Cfa

Cerro Corá (Guarani: Yvyty Kora) is a city and district and located in the Amambay Department of Paraguay on the Amambai Mountains. It was created by Law 6555, detaching itself from the municipality of Pedro Juan Caballero, which is 20 km (12 mi) from the center of the departmental capital. Its urban center has the name of Colonia Capitán Raúl Ocampos Rojas, also known as Chiriguelo. It has an area of 1451 km^{2}.

== See also ==
- Battle of Cerro Corá, 1870
