= Venancio López =

Paraguayan military officer (1830–1870)

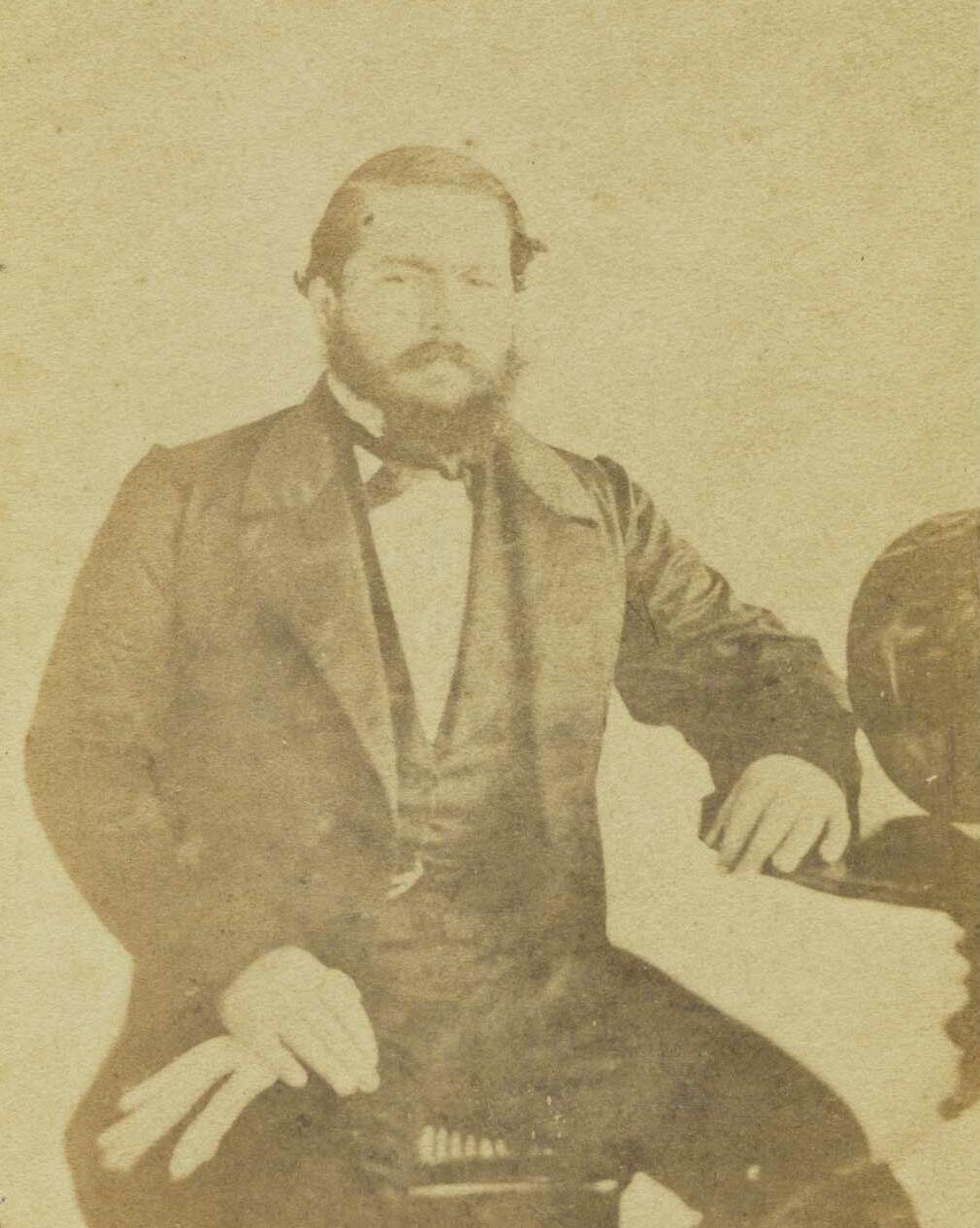

Minister of War and Navy
- In office 29 October 1862 – 26 May 1865
- Preceded by: Francisco Solano López
- Succeeded by: Vicente Barrios

Personal details
- Born: 18 May 1830 Asunción, Paraguay
- Died: 5 February 1870 (aged 39) Chiriguelo, Paraguay
- Awards: Commander of the National Order of Merit

Military service
- Branch/service: Paraguayan Army
- Years of service: 1850–1868
- Rank: Colonel
- Battles/wars: Triple Alliance War

Venancio López Carrillo (18 May 1830 – 5 February 1870) was a Paraguayan politician and military officer. He was Carlos Antonio López's son, and Francisco Solano López' brother; Carlos was Paraguay's leader between 1841 and 1862, and Francisco was President between 1862 and 1870. Venancio was for years Minister of War and Navy, and, before that, commander of the Asunción Paraguayan Army garrison.

== Biography ==
=== Early life and studies ===
Venancio was born in the 18th of May 1830 in Asunción, being the second of the five children of Paraguayan leader Carlos Antonio López and his wife Juana Pabla Carrillo.

He studied in the capital under notable teachers of the time, including a Jesuit, Bernardo Parés. From 1850 onwards he was named commander for the Paraguayan Army troops stationed in the capital (he was 20 years old), until his brother, Francisco Solano López, became president in 1862 in the aftermath of their father's death. Solano then named Venancio his Minister of War and Navy. The entire family had, over the years, become important landowners, including Venancio.

In 1864, Venancio married Manuela Otazú. The couple had three children: Venancio Victor (b. 1862, d. 1927), Ercilia (b. 1865, d. 1962) and Carlos (b. 1867).

=== Work as minister and death ===
His term as Minister was very eventful. In 1864, the Triple Alliance War started, pitting Paraguay versus Brazil, Uruguay and, from 1865 onwards, Argentina. Brazil alone had a population more than 10 times Paraguay's, so, despite some initial daring moves by the Paraguayan forces, they soon found themselves on the defensive. The conduct of the war was, however, led by his brother, now a Marshal, Francisco Solano. In May 1865, the Marshal named General Vicente Barrios as Minister of War - Venancio went back to Asunción, to once again command its garrison. This was an unimportant role, for the Allied troops were held up by the Fortress of Humaitá and other Paraguayan fortifications, and thus far away from the capital.

In 1868, with the war's fortunes dwindling for Paraguay, Solano López announced he had discovered a conspiracy to murder him, led by Charles Ames Washburn, the chief American diplomat in Paraguay. In the months after this, he ordered the arrest of hundreds of Paraguayans from the leading families of the country, and most of the resident foreigners, for complicity in the plot; Venancio, their other brother Benigno, and their mother and sisters were amongst the arrested. Most of the arrested were killed after sham-trials in the San Fernando massacre; according to documents of the time, Venancio was spared for showing regret for his role in the conspiracy.

Venancio was tortured over the following months and, in one of the final deadly marches in the Campaign of the Hills in 1870, mere weeks before the Battle of Cerro Corá (which concluded the war), underfed, exhausted and shackled, he collapsed and was subsequently killed by an unknown Paraguayan officer. This happened near Chiriguelo.
