= Cerro Cora (film) =

1978 film

- Directed by: Guillermo Vera
- Written by: Ladislao González; Guillermo Vera
- Starring: Roberto De Felice; Rosa Ros; Pedro Ignacio Aceval
- Cinematography: Osvaldo Paradiso
- Edited by: Eduardo Cascales; Víctor Villarreal
- Music by: Óscar Cardozo Ocampo; Felipe Sosa
- Release date: 1978
- Country: Paraguay
- Languages: Spanish; Guarani

Cerro Cora is a 1978 Paraguayan epic war film set during the last days of the Paraguayan War. Considered a propaganda film, it was described by the dictatorship as the first colour feature made in Paraguay and as a homage to Alfredo Stroessner and the nineteenth century military general Francisco Solano López.

== Cast ==
- Roberto De Felice as Francisco Solano López
- Rosa Ros as Eliza Lynch
- Nicasio Altamirano Valiente as Vice-President Sánchez
- José Alfredo Pellón as Juan Crisóstomo Centurión
- Fátima Coronel as Rosita Carrera
- Victorino Baez Irala as General José Eduvigis Díaz
- Pedro Moliniers as Bartolomé Mitre

== See also ==
- Battle of Acosta Ñu
- Battle of Cerro Cora
