= Ercilia López de Blomberg =

- Born: Ercilia López Carrillo y Otazú Machaín; 11 August 1868
- Died: 1 January 1962 (aged 96)
- Notable work: Don Inca
- Family: Grandfather - Carlos Antonio Lopez; Father - Venancio López

Ercilia López de Blomberg (1865 - 1962) was a poet, essayist and novelist from Paraguay. She had major patriotist influences with her works in Paraguay.

== Biography ==
=== Refuge to Buenos Aires ===
Ercilia Blomberg was born on 11 August 1865. She was the daughter of the war minister Venancio López, and the granddaughter of the president of Paraguay - Carlos Antonio López. When she was three years old, she and her mother left the capital of Paraguay. Meanwhile, her father Venancio Lopez died before the hecatomb of Cerro Corá, mainly due to torture.

Her uncle was shot in Lomas Valentinas during the last stages of the war in 1868. Along with her brothers and her mother, at the age of three they relocated to Buenos Aires, fleeing from Paraguay to Argentina. She studied in a private school, learning English.

=== Return to Paraguay ===
Ercilia's mother, Mrs. Manuela, was in very poor health and returned to Paraguay, where she died in 1880. In June 1879, Ercilia wrote a poem which was published in the newspaper "El Comercio", which was patriotically named "To Paraguay". She married Hector Pedro Blomberg, who later left her a widow; she completely dedicated herself to raising her children at the time.

== Don Inca ==
Don Inca, her autobiography, is considered her most valued work during the years. It is a dramatic reflection of her life. Moreover, there is a series of historical events depicted in the writing.

Later, in 1921, she published an essay over the Guarani language, in which she grew to have vast knowledge of the subject.

Blomberg died in 1962; she was 97 years old.
