= Cerro Corá National Park =

National Park in Paraguay

Coordinates: 22°39′S 56°11′W

Cerro Cora National Park
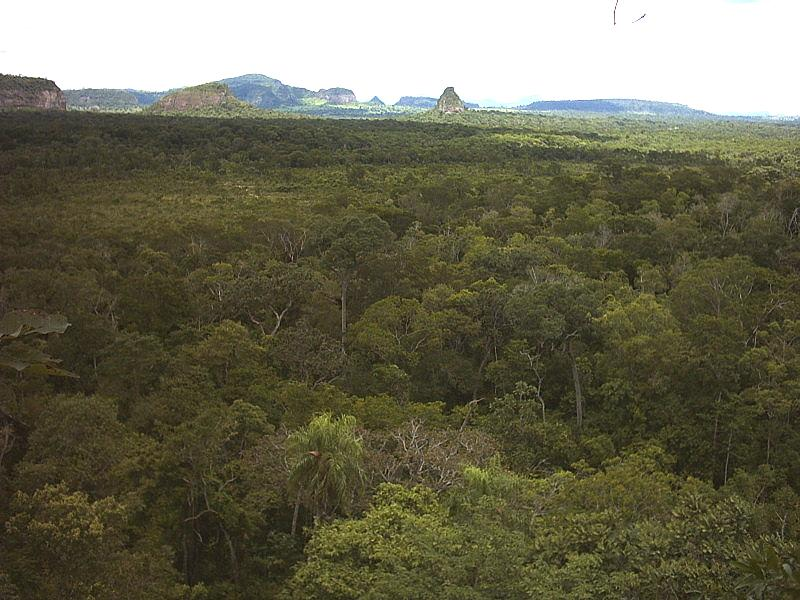
- View of the Park and hills
- Interactive map of Cerro Cora National Park
- Location: Amambay Department, Paraguay
- Nearest city: Pedro Juan Caballero
- Area: 5.538 ha (13.68 acres)
- Established: 1976

Cerro Cora National Park (also spelled Cerro Corá) is the largest protected area in Paraguay with 5,538 hectares. It is located in Amambay Department, 45 km from the departmental capital, Pedro Juan Caballero and the border with Brazil. Established on February 11, 1976, it is a nature reserve, as well as a major historical site. It was the location where the last battle of the Paraguayan War took place on March 1, 1870.

== Background ==
The park has several historical monuments, a museum, and a recreation area by the Aquidabán River.

In addition to the historical background, many visitors come to the park to appreciate ancient rock writings located in hill caves around the area.

== History ==
The Paraguayan War (1864–1870) ended next to the Aquidaban Nigui Brook, where Francisco Solano López died saying his famous last words, "I die along with my country." It was the location where the last battle of the Paraguayan War took place on March 1, 1870.

The Cerro Cora National Park, once a virgin rainforest, suffered deforestation. The area was declared protected, and the national park was created.

The park is surrounded by hills, including Ponta Porá, Guazu, Tacuru Pytâ, Alambique, Cerro Corá, Miron, Tanqueria, and Tangaro. These and other high-elevation areas give shape to a peculiar landscape.

== Route ==
The Park is located 454 km from Asunción, and 45 km from Pedro Juan Caballero. Visitors leaving from Asunción can take Ruta 2 to Coronel Oviedo city. There they would take Ruta 3 up to the connection with Ruta 5 and take the exit to Yby Yaú city.

== Culture ==
The park is divided in zones according to the theme of the place and accessibility. It has guides and guards. There is an auditorium, a visitors center, and a recreation area.

Petroglyphs are inscribed in rock shelters throughout the park. A rock art research team from the National Museum and Research Center of Altamira dated the petroglyphs in 2008 and found that some of them were 5,000 years old. The Paï Tavytera indigenous peoples live in the region now.

== Gallery ==
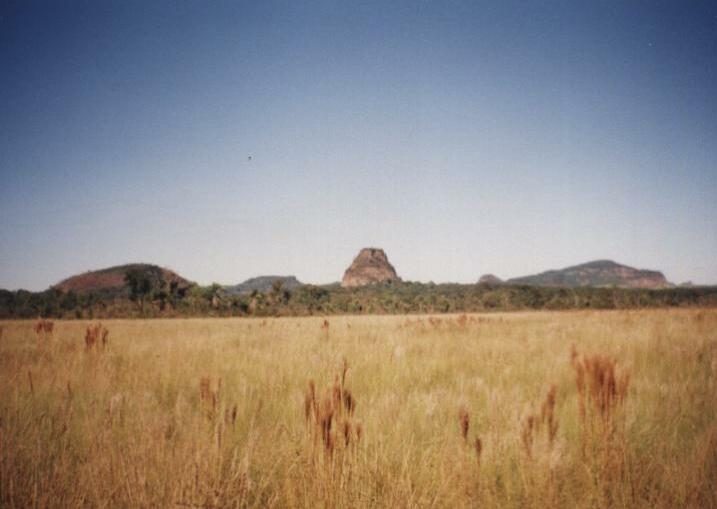
Landscape with valley and hills

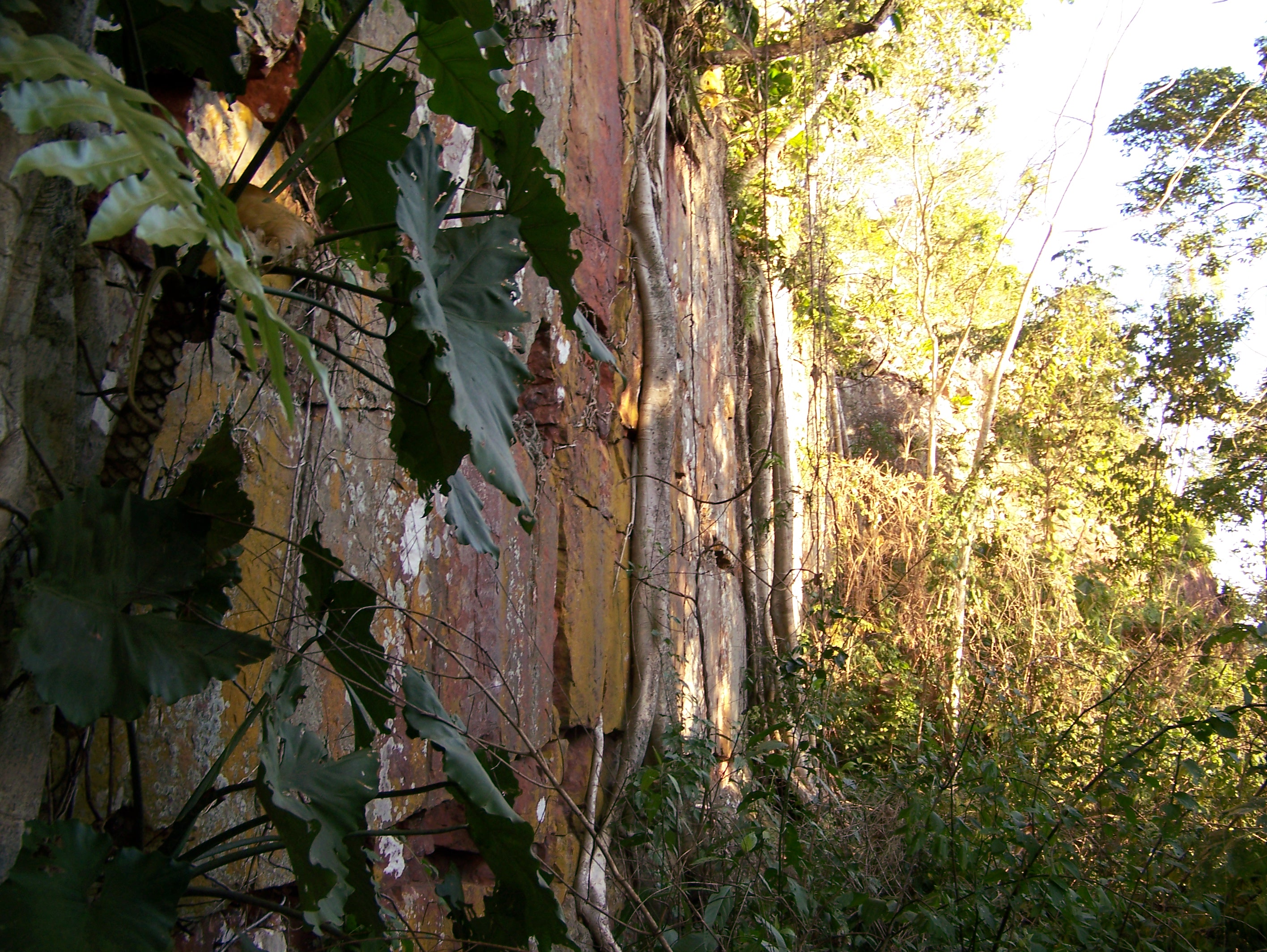
Cerro Muralla or "Wall Hill" is a hill in Amambay on Cerro Cora national park that resembles a wall, 2008

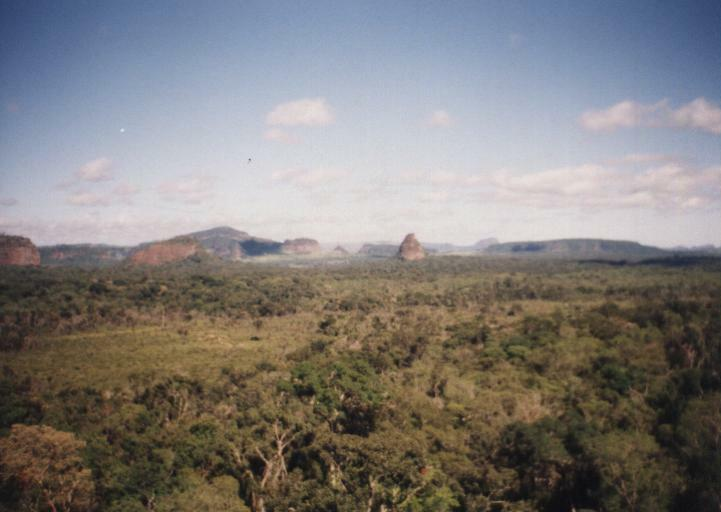
View of the forest surrounded by hills
