= Capitán Bado =

Capitán Bado Ñu Vera (Guarani)
- City
- Location within Paraguay
- Coordinates: 23°15′36″S 55°32′24″W
- Country: Paraguay
- Department: Amambay

Population (2008)
  - Total: 11,319
- Climate: Cfa

Capitán Bado (Guarani: Ñu Vera) is a city in the Amambay department of Paraguay. It was founded on July 25, 1914, during the government of Eduardo Schaerer. It is located on the Amambai Mountains, the mountain range in northern Paraguay.

== Toponymy ==
The city was founded under the name "Captain Bado" in honor of José Matías Bado, an army officer from the town of Pilar who fought in the War of the Triple Alliance, when Paraguay opposed Argentina, Uruguay and Brazil. Before that, the city was known as Ñu Verá, meaning "bright field" in Guarani.

== Geography ==
Located 110 km from Pedro Juan Caballero, Capitán Bado is a frontier city on the boundary between Paraguay and Brazil. It spreads to the foot of the Cordillera del Amambay and only a street separates it from the Brazilian city of Coronel Sapucaia.

== Economy ==
The main economic activity of the population is agriculture. Yerba mate is chiefly grown alongside subsistence products such as fruits and vegetables. There is also large-scale logging and sawing, and subsequent export of roundwood. This is done without adequate control, and as a result the district has reached high levels of deforestation. The city has major sawmills, as well as yerba mate silos and mills.

The inhabitants are also engaged in local business, import and export. The Avenida Internacional ("International Avenue") is the border with the city of Coronel Sapucaia in Brazil.

=== Cannabis cultivation ===
Capitán Bado's informal economy also produces of Indian hemp or pressed marijuana, also known as "brick weed," as usual in the province of Amambay, which accounts for 75% of the total 5,000 hectares of plantation land in Paraguay.
