= José Berges =

Paraguayan diplomat

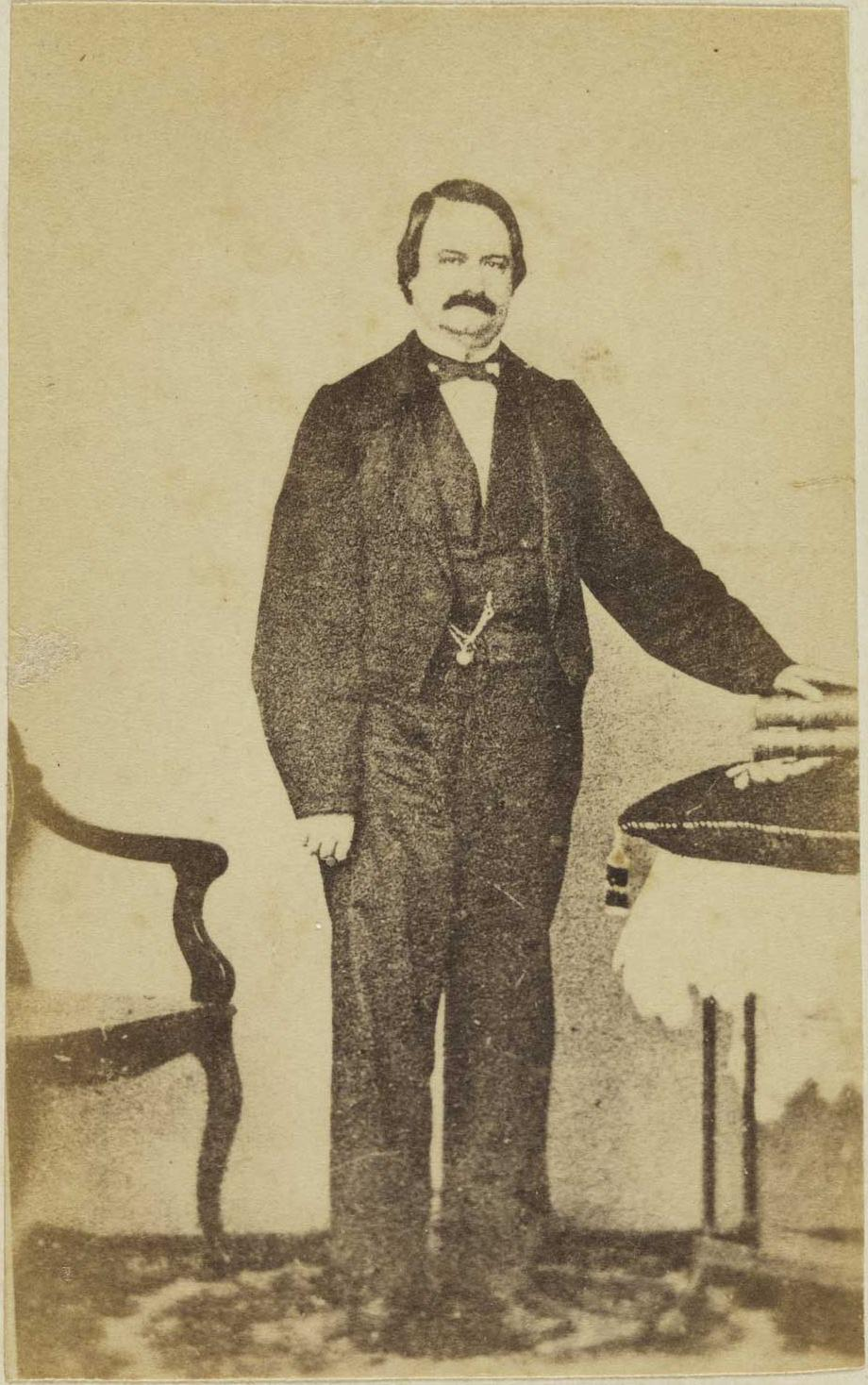

Minister of Foreign Affairs
- In office 29 October 1862 – 14 June 1868
- Preceded by: Domingo F. Sánchez
- Succeeded by: Gumersindo Benítez

Personal details
- Born: 21 August 1814 Asunción, Paraguay
- Died: 21 December 1868 (aged 54) San Fernando, Paraguay

José Timoteo de la Paz Berges Villaalta (21 August 1814 – 21 December 1868) was a Paraguayan diplomat who served as the Minister of Foreign Affairs during the rule of Paraguayan dictator Francisco Solano López and the Paraguayan War.

Like many prominent Paraguayans, Berges was accused of conspiring against López, arrested, severely tortured (he was "reduced to groveling idiocy") and shot for treason on 21 December 1868 in the San Fernando massacre. There was probably no conspiracy.
