= Bella Vista Norte =

Bella Vista
- Location within Paraguay
- Coordinates: 22°7′48″S 56°31′12″W
- Country: Paraguay
- Department: Amambay

Population (2008)
  - Total: 6,145
- Climate: Am

Bella Vista is a border town in northeast of Paraguay, bordering the Brazilian town of Bela Vista, Mato Grosso do Sul. Both towns are divided by the Apa River, only connected by a borderbridge. It is a small town in the northern region of Amambay. Getting there is possible by way of Brazil or over a red earth road from the Paraguayan country-side.

== Sources ==
- World Gazeteer: Paraguay – World-Gazetteer.com
