= Chico Diabo =

Brazilian military personnel (c. 1848–1893)

José Francisco Lacerda
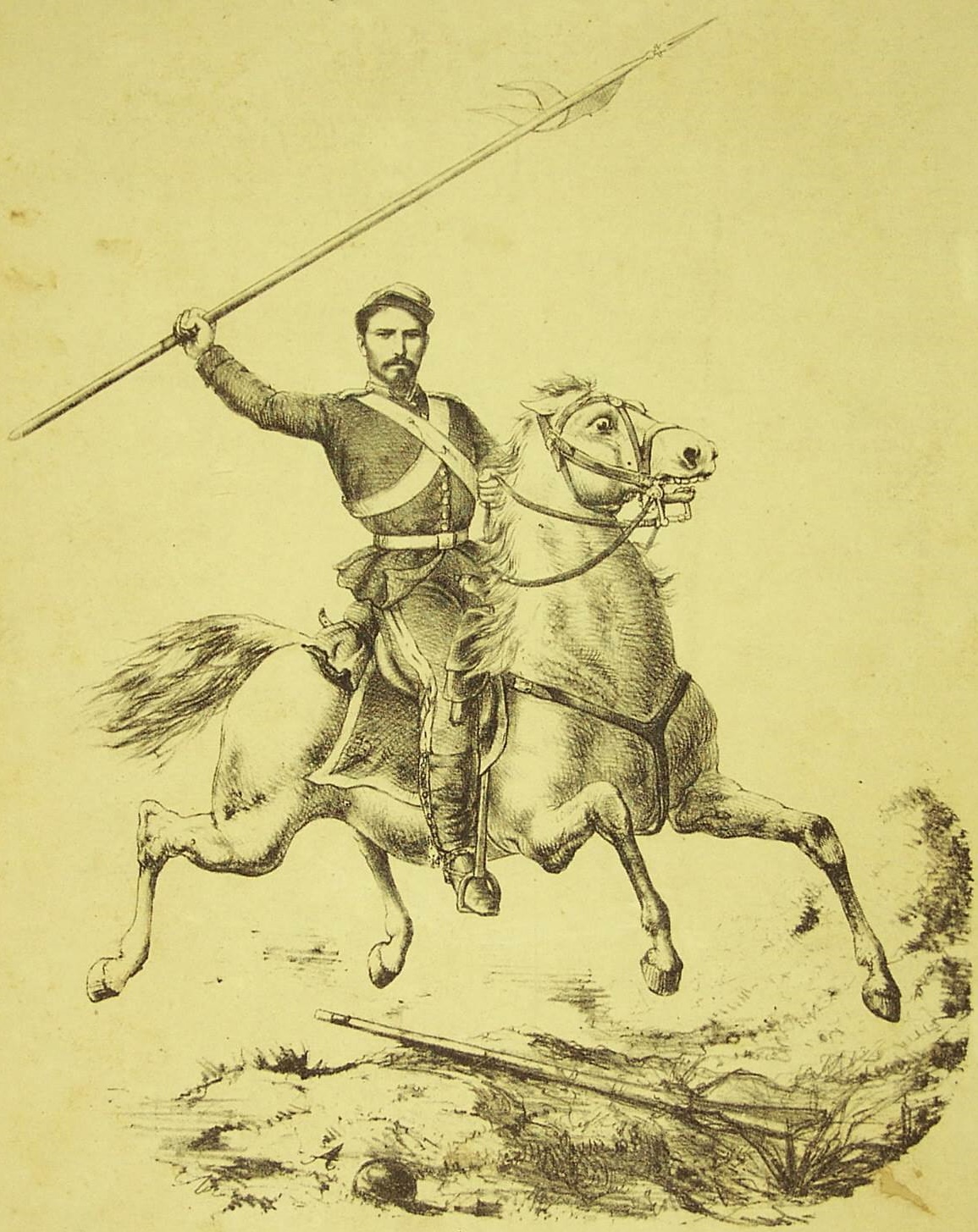
- Corporal Francisco Lacerda, nicknamed Chico Diabo (A Vida Fluminense, 1870).
- Born: c. 1848; Camaquã, Rio Grande do Sul, Empire of Brazil
- Died: 1893; Cerro Largo, Uruguay
- Military career
- Allegiance: Empire of Brazil
- Service years: 1865–1870
- Rank: Corporal
- Nickname: Chico Diabo
- Known for: Killing Francisco Solano López
- Conflicts: Paraguayan War

José Francisco Lacerda (c. 1848–1893), nicknamed Chico Diabo (Devil Frank), was a corporal in the Imperial Brazilian Army who fought in the Paraguayan War and gained fame for killing the Paraguayan president Francisco Solano López in the Battle of Cerro Corá.

== Biography ==
Chico was born in a poor family. As a boy, he worked in a slaughterhouse owned by an Italian immigrant in São Lourenço do Sul, a neighboring municipality to his hometown of Camaquã. In this slaughterhouse he made products such as beef, sausage and salami.

In 1863, when he was 15 years old, Chico failed to prevent a dog from entering the slaughterhouse's meat storage room. Upon learning that a dog had eaten some of his products, the slaughterhouse owner beat Chico. The boy fatally stabbed his employer. After the stabbing, Chico fled on foot to his parents' house, arriving in the next morning.

When she saw someone was approaching their house, Chico's mother exclaimed: "I assure you it's that little devil that's coming." The nickname Chico Devil would follow Chico for the rest of his life.

Chico's parents, fearing that their son might suffer reprisals, sent him to live with an uncle, Vicente Lacerda, in Bagé.

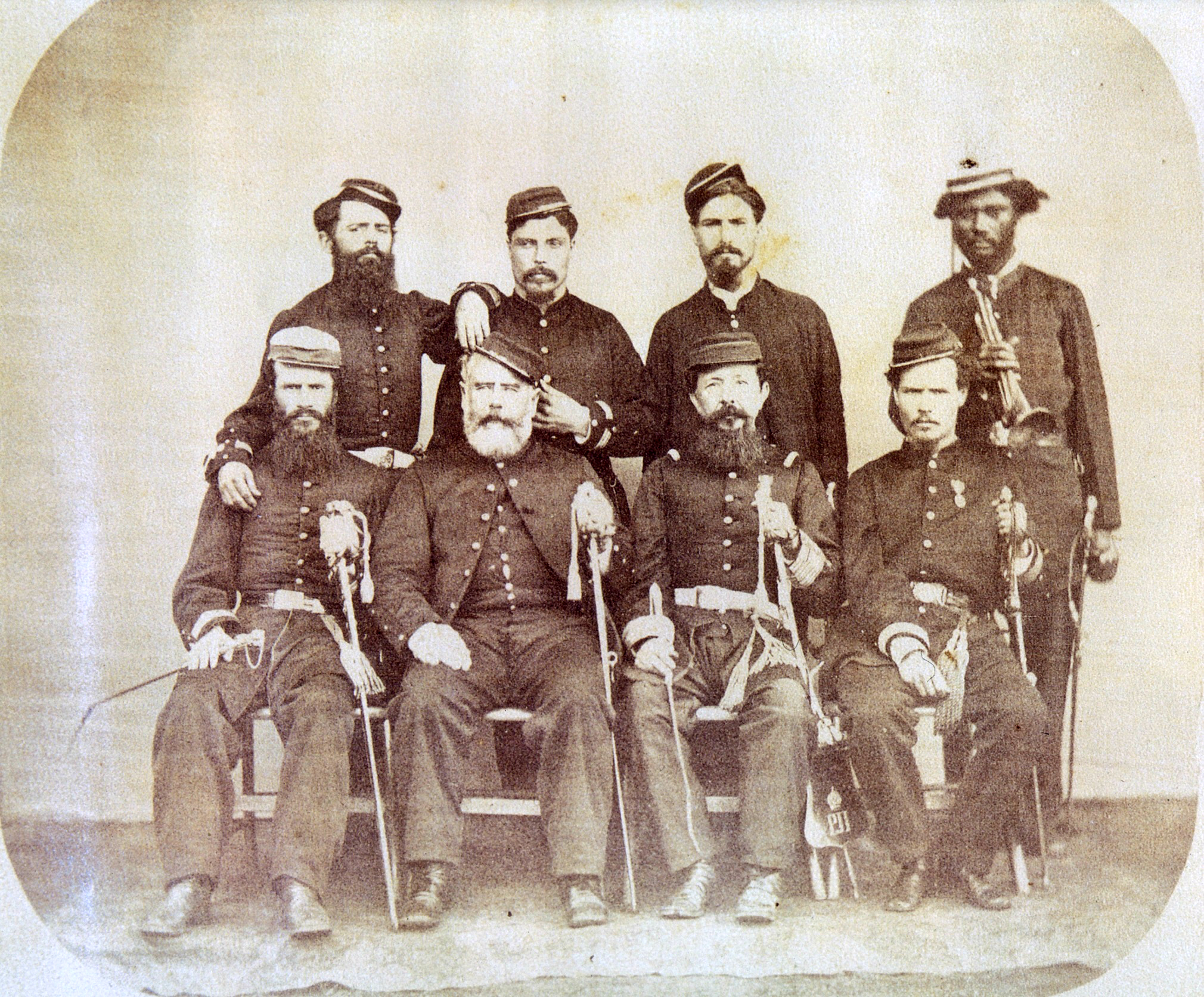
Colonel Joca Tavares (third sitting, from right) and his immediate assistants, including José Francisco Lacerda, better known as "Chico Diabo" (third standing, from left), responsible for killing Solano López.

In 1865, Chico joined a detachment of the Volunteers of the Homeland, commanded by the then Colonel Joca Tavares, that was passing through Bagé on its way to the front.

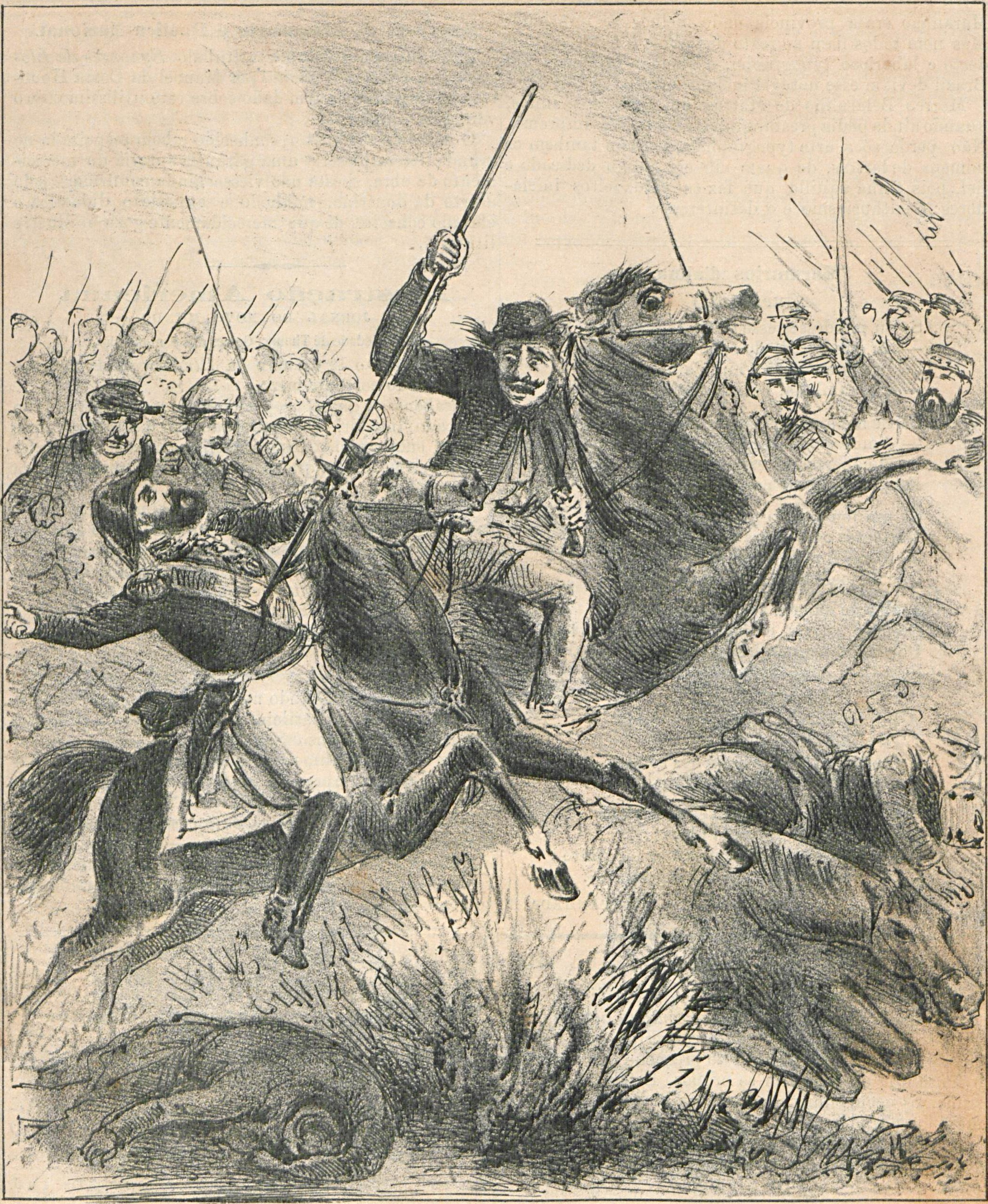
Chico Diabo mortally wounding President Solano López with a spear during the Battle of Cerro Corá (Semana Illustrada, 1870).

In 1870, Chico, by then a corporal, gained fame for killing dictator Francisco Solano López with a lance blow in the Battle of Cerro Corá. The wound was apparently fatal, although private João Soares also shot Lopez with a revolver.

It is possible that Chico failed to obey orders, which might have demanded that Solano López be captured alive, when he struck the dictator. But there is no consensus among historians whether such an order was issued. Some authors even claim that there was a reward of one hundred pounds of gold for anyone who killed him. According to contemporary sources, Emperor Pedro II did not authorize Chico's commanding officer, Colonel Lacerda, to be awarded a medal for bravery in combat for fears that in Europe it might be thought that Solano López had been killed after surrendering.

Nonetheless, Chico was awarded a hundred young cows that have not given birth yet (called "vaquilhonas"). He also took the silver and gold that López carried when he was killed. The gold was engraved with Solano López's initials, FL, which were coincidentally the same as Chico's. The lance he used to kill Solano López is in the National Historical Museum, in Rio de Janeiro.

Chico Diabo's grave in the Cemetery of the Guard in Bagé, Rio Grande do Sul.

At the time, Chico's name was enshrined in a popular Brazilian rhyming song: "O Cabo Chico Diabo, do diabo Chico deu cabo" ("Corporal Devil Chico got rid of the Chico Devil").

Upon returning from Paraguay in 1871, Chico married a cousin, Isabel Vaz Lacerda, with whom he had four children, and worked as a foreman in several ranches.

He died suddenly in 1893 when he was in Uruguay in the service of Joca Tavares. Years later, his widow hired a Uruguayan to retrieve Chico's remains and bring them to Brazil. His body was buried in the Cemetery of the Guard, in Bagé. In 2002, the local historical research society placed a memorial plaque on top of his grave.
