= Aquidabán River =

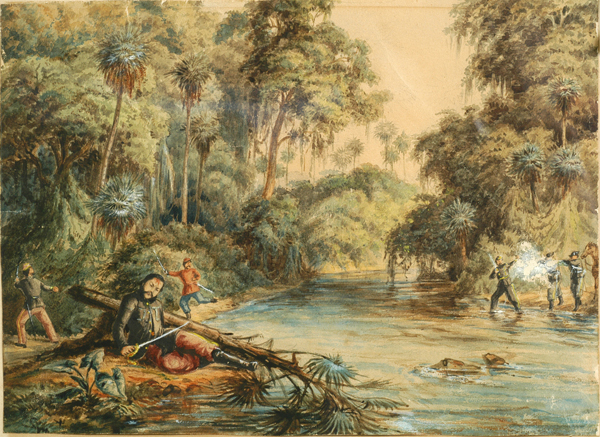
- Solano López's death on the banks of the Aquidabán River in 1870

Location
- Country: Paraguay

Physical characteristics
- Source
  - coordinates: 22.8971°S 55.7130°W
- Mouth
  - coordinates: 23.1108°S 57.6211°W
- Length: 250 km

The Aquidabán River (Spanish: Río Aquidabán) is a river in the Amambay Department, in northeastern Paraguay. It is a tributary of the larger Paraguay River. Its headwaters start in the Amambai Mountains, and the river flows east-to-west to eventually merge into the Paraguay River just north of Concepción.

== See also ==
- List of rivers of Paraguay
