= Domingo Francisco Sánchez =

Paraguayan politician

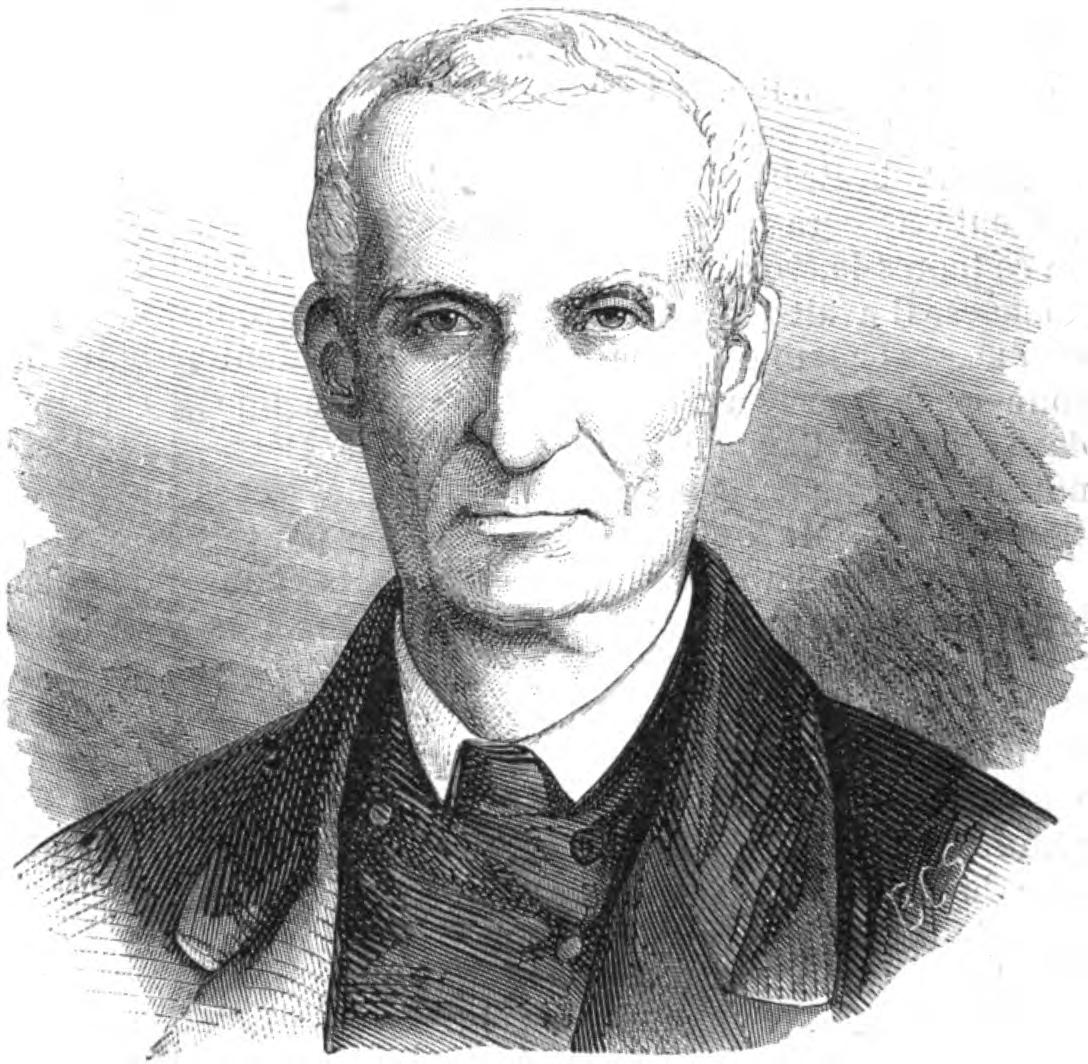
- Sánchez in 1867

Vice President of Paraguay
- In office 25 May 1865 – 1 March 1870
- Preceded by: Francisco Solano López
- Succeeded by: Sotero Cayo Miltos

Minister of Foreign Affairs
- In office 23 May 1860 – 29 October 1862
- Preceded by: Nicolás Vázquez
- Succeeded by: José Berges Villalta

Personal details
- Born: 20 March 1795 Asunción, Paraguay
- Died: 1 March 1870 (aged 74) Cerro Corá, Paraguay
- Occupation: Politician, statesman

Military service
- Battles / wars: Paraguayan War; Battle of Cerro Corá †

Domingo Francisco Sánchez Corvalán (20 March 1795 – 1 March 1870) was a Paraguayan politician and statesman who served as the Vice President of Paraguay during the administration of Francisco Solano López from 1865 to 1870. Sánchez was one of the few officials who worked in the administrations of Gaspar Rodríguez de Francia, Carlos Antonio López and Solano López.

On 1 March 1870, he died in combat with Brazilian soldiers at the Battle of Cerro Corá, the last battle of the Paraguayan War, alongside Solano López and Secretary of State Luis Caminos.

Political offices
Preceded by Francisco Solano López	Vice President of Paraguay; 25 May 1865 – 1 March 1870	Succeeded by Sotero Cayo Miltos
Preceded by Nicolás Vázquez	Minister of Foreign Affairs; 10 September 1862 – 25 May 1865	Succeeded by José Berges Villalta
