= Hilario Marcó =

Paraguayan Colonel of the Paraguayan War

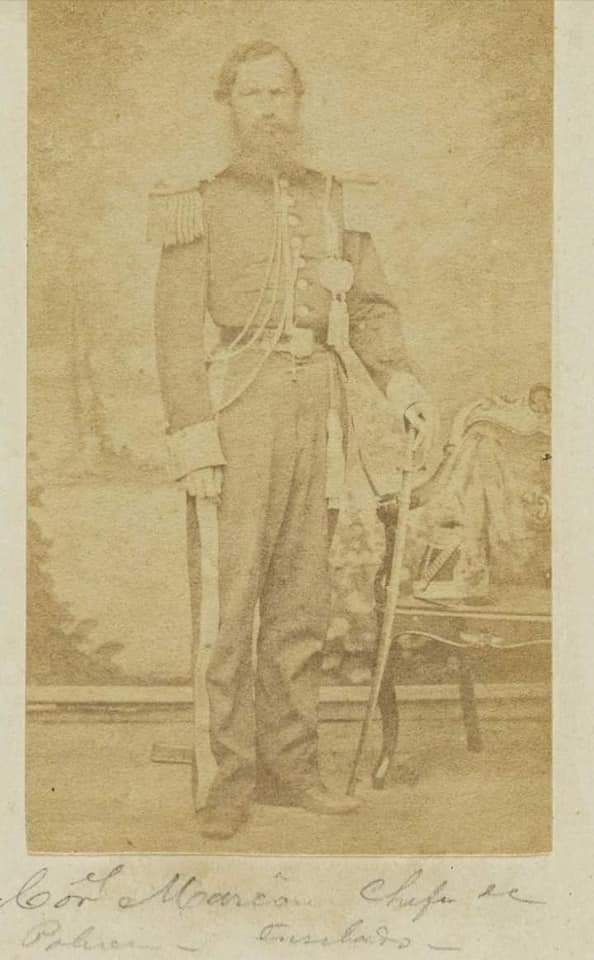
- Born: c. 1827; Yaguarón, Paraguarí, Paraguay
- Died: October 1869 (aged 41–42); Atyrá, Cordillera, Paraguay
- Military career
- Allegiance: Paraguay
- Branch: Paraguayan Army
- Service years: 1850–1869
- Rank: Coronel
- Conflicts: Paraguayan War; Humaitá campaign; Battle of Tuyutí (WIA); Pikysyry campaign; 1868 San Fernando massacre; Campaign of the Hills (executed)

Hilario Marcó (1827 – October 1869) was a Paraguayan Colonel of the Paraguayan War. He was known as a primary commander at the Battle of Tuyutí and one of the main leaders of the 1868 San Fernando massacre which executed alleged conspirators against President Francisco Solano López.

== Early career ==
Hilário Marcó started his career in a newspaper office called the Imprenta del Estado in 1845. In 1850 though, he became an ensign in the Paraguayan Army within Battalion Nº 1 based in Paso de Patria. With the rank of captain, Hilario Marcó became the commander of the police force in the Paraguayan capital Asunción in October 1858.

== Paraguayan War ==
When the war broke out, Marcó already held the rank of lieutenant colonel and participated in several battles, notably within the Battle of Tuyutí on 24 May 1866, where he commanded a column of 4300 men that would force an attack on the center of the allied camp. During the battle, Marcó lost his left hand. For his performance in the battle, he received the distinction of the National Order of Merit. He would later command the firing squad against alleged conspirators of Solano López during the 1868 San Fernando massacre. Marcó would be sentenced to death after being accused of conspiring with Venancio López to overthrow Solano López along with 16 other officers. He was shot in October 1869 after weeks of torture.
