= Karapaí =

Karapaí Karapã'i
- City and district
- Location within Paraguay
- Coordinates: 23°35′57″S 55°59′10″W
- Country: Paraguay
- Department: Amambay
- Created: October 22, 2013

Government
  - Intendant: To be elected in 2015

Area
  - Total: 1,274 km^{2} (492 sq mi)

Population (2022)
  - Total: 4,988
  - Density: 3.915/km^{2} (10.14/sq mi)
- Time zone: UTC-03 (PYT)

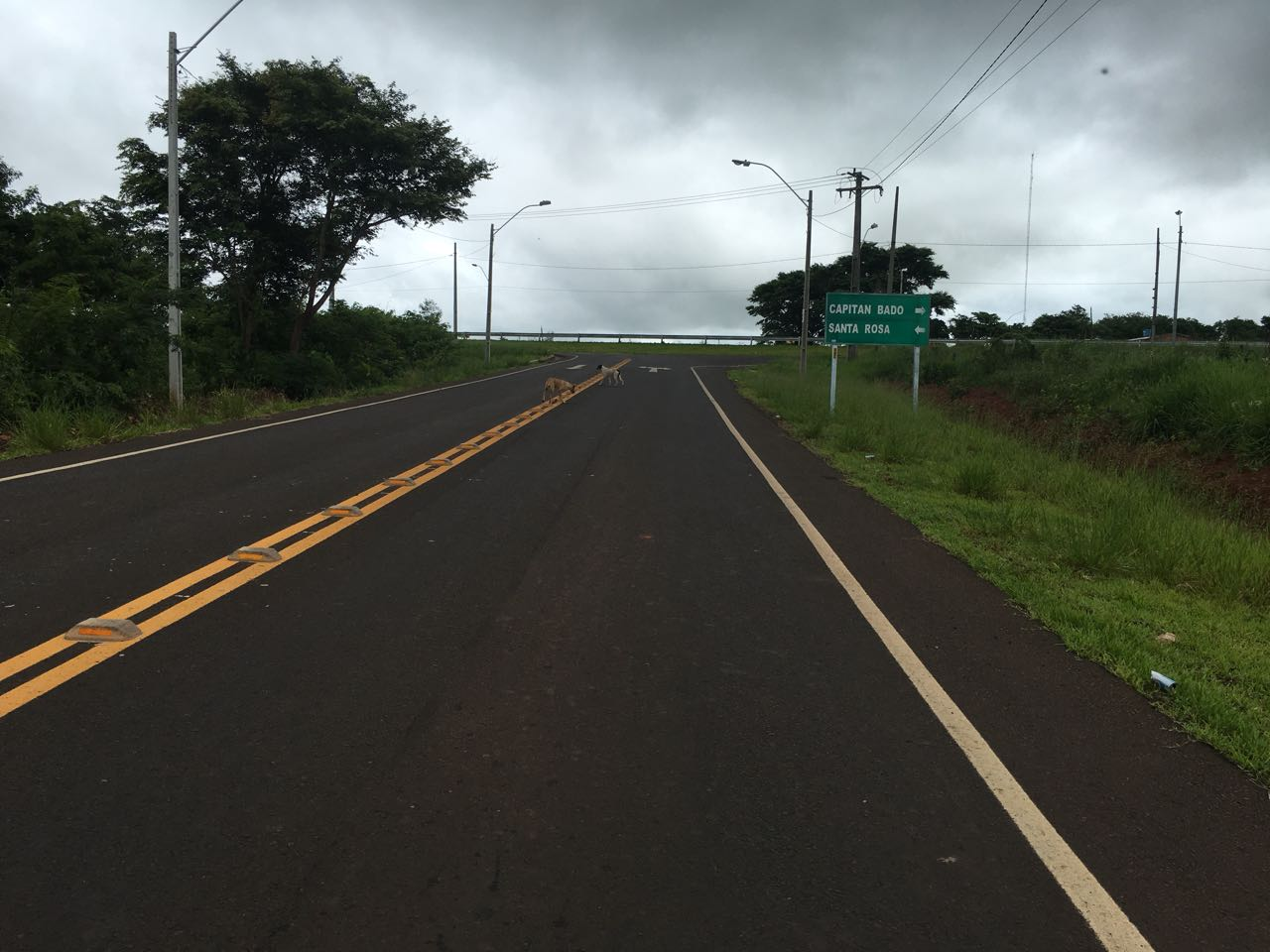
Access Road to Karapai

Karapaí (locally known as Estrella del Norte) is a municipality in Paraguay, located in the Amambay Department. It is the fifth and newest district created in Amambay.
