= 1868 San Fernando massacre =

1868 massacre in Paraguay

San Fernando massacre
- Part of the Paraguayan War
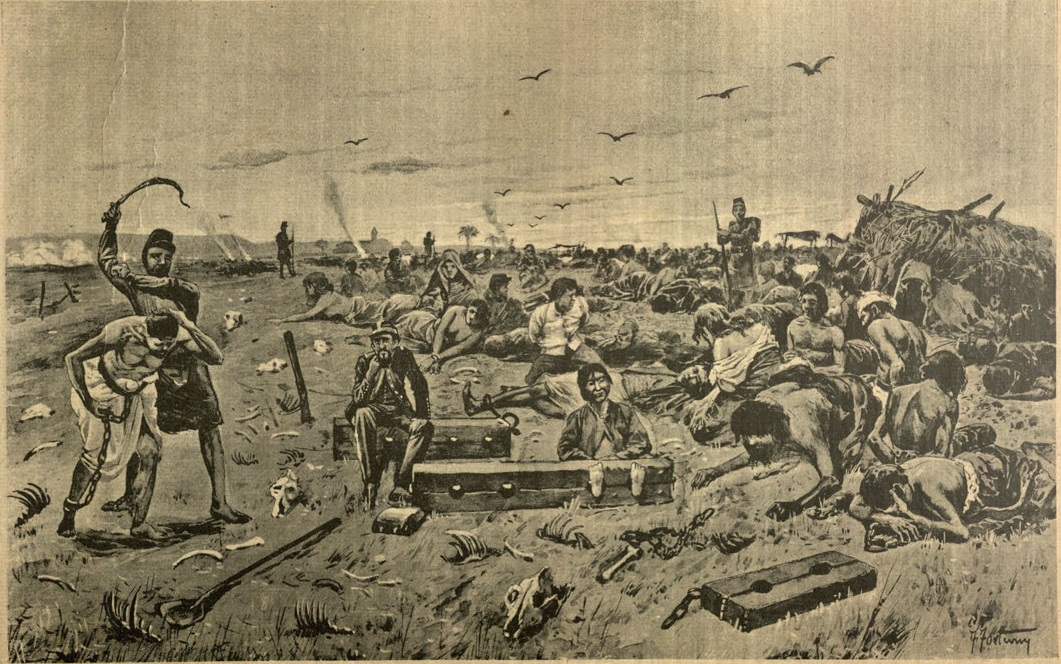
- Lithography depicting war prisoners and Paraguayan families captured and tortured in San Fernando
- Date: 21 December 1868
- Location: San Fernando, Paraguay
- Participants: Francisco Solano López

The San Fernando massacre (Spanish: Matanza de San Fernando) was an episode that took place on 21 December 1868, on the eve of the Battle of Lomas Valentinas, during the Pikysyry campaign in the Paraguayan War, which consisted of the summary trial and execution of hundreds of prisoners by order of Paraguayan president Francisco Solano López. Some prisoners were accused of plotting an alleged conspiracy to overthrow López. Among the dead was López's own brother, Benigno López.

== The massacre ==
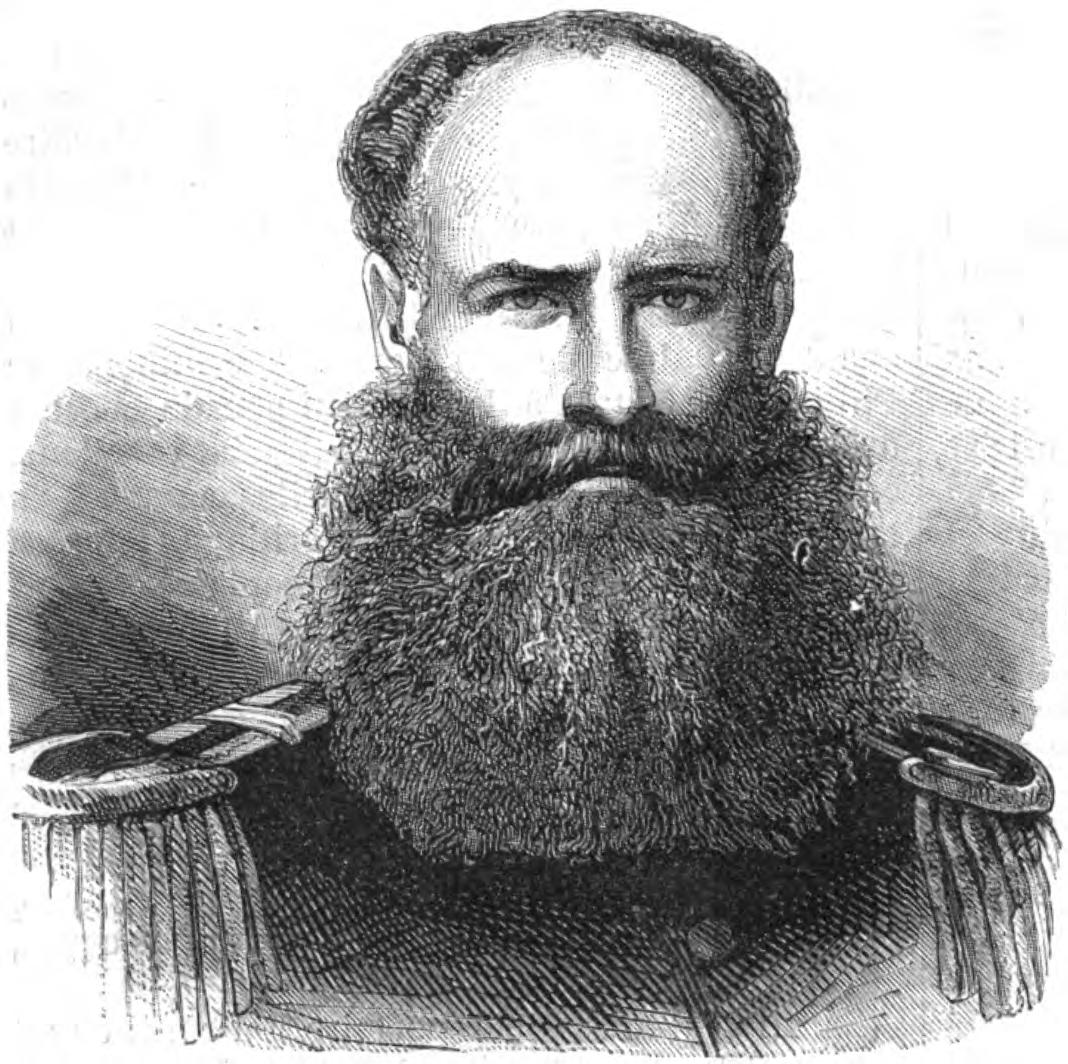
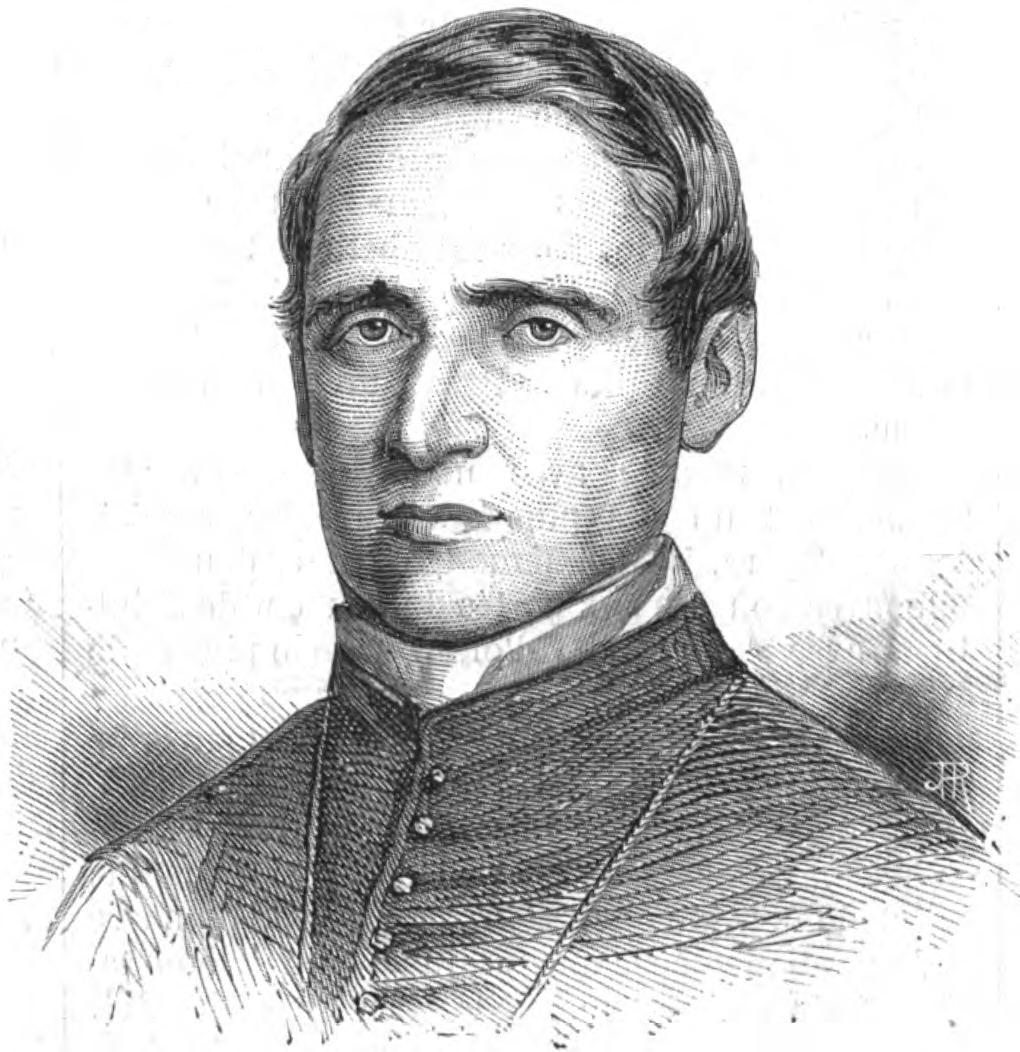
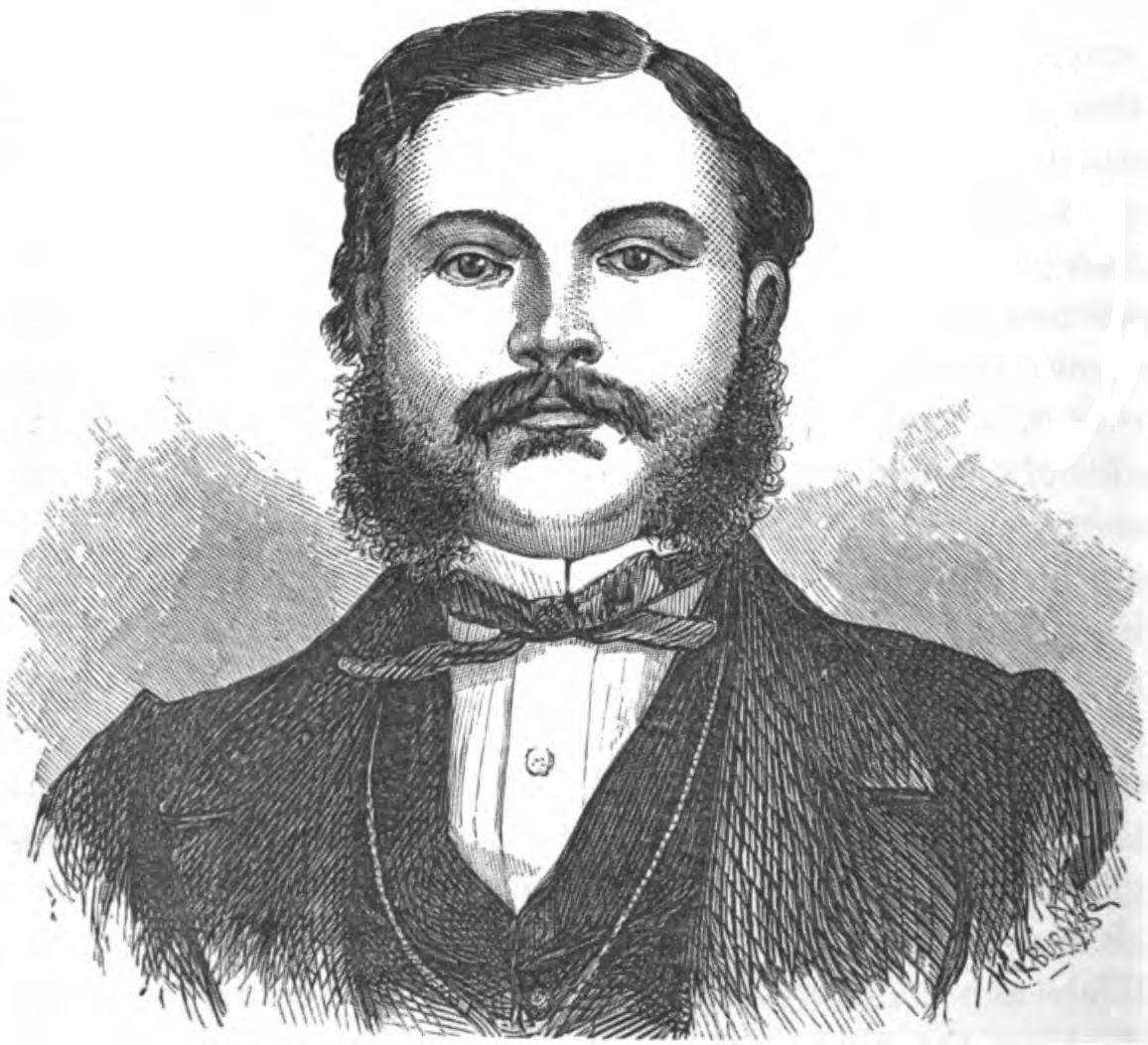
† General Vicente Barrios, bishop Manuel Antonio Palacios and Benigno López, executed in December 1868

López left Humaitá with his troops in March 1868 and set camp in San Fernando, where he learned that many government officials were plotting to betray him and negotiate peace with the allies, including his brother Benigno López, headed by the American Ambassador to Paraguay Charles Ames Washburn.

López then formed a council of war to try the conspirators, where hundreds were executed. For the task, López sent colonel Hilario Marcó on 21 December 1868, though eventually he formed 6 tribunals to try the accused (for whom no defense was allowed). Among the dead were: José Berges and Gumersindo Benítez, former ministers of Foreign Affairs of Paraguay, general José María Bruguez, general Vicente Barrios, former minister of War and Navy and brother-in-law of López, colonel Manuel Núñez, colonel Paulino Alén Benítez, sergeant major Vicente Mora, bishop of Paraguay Manuel Antonio Palacios, dean Eugenio Bogado, priest Vicente Bazán, priest Juan Bautista Zalduondo, Carlos Riveros, Saturnino Bedoya, also brother-in-law of López, Gaspar López, Juliana Insfrán de Martínez, wife of colonel Francisco Martínez, defender of Humaitá, shot in the back as a "traitor of the fatherland and the Supreme Government" after her husband had surrendered the fortress, Dolores Recalde, María de Jesús Egusquiza Quevedo, the Portuguese consul José Maria Leite Pereira, the leader of the Uruguayan Blanco Party Antonio de Las Carreras, the former secretary of the Uruguayan Legation Francisco Rodríguez Larrata, the Italian captain Simón Fidanza, among many others.

== Historiography ==
Juan Crisóstomo Centurión, a veteran Paraguayan army officer who had at times contributed with the tribunals of San Fernando, raised, in his memoirs, the possibility that some of the conspiracies confronted by them were real. Other sources of the time are more categorically negative on the existence of a threat to Solano López' power, such as George Thompson and George Frederick Masterman. Overall the historiography on the San Fernando massacre tends to be either positive or negative depending on the author in question's view of López.
