= Battle of Cerro Corá =

1870 final battle of the Paraguayan War

- Part of the Paraguayan War
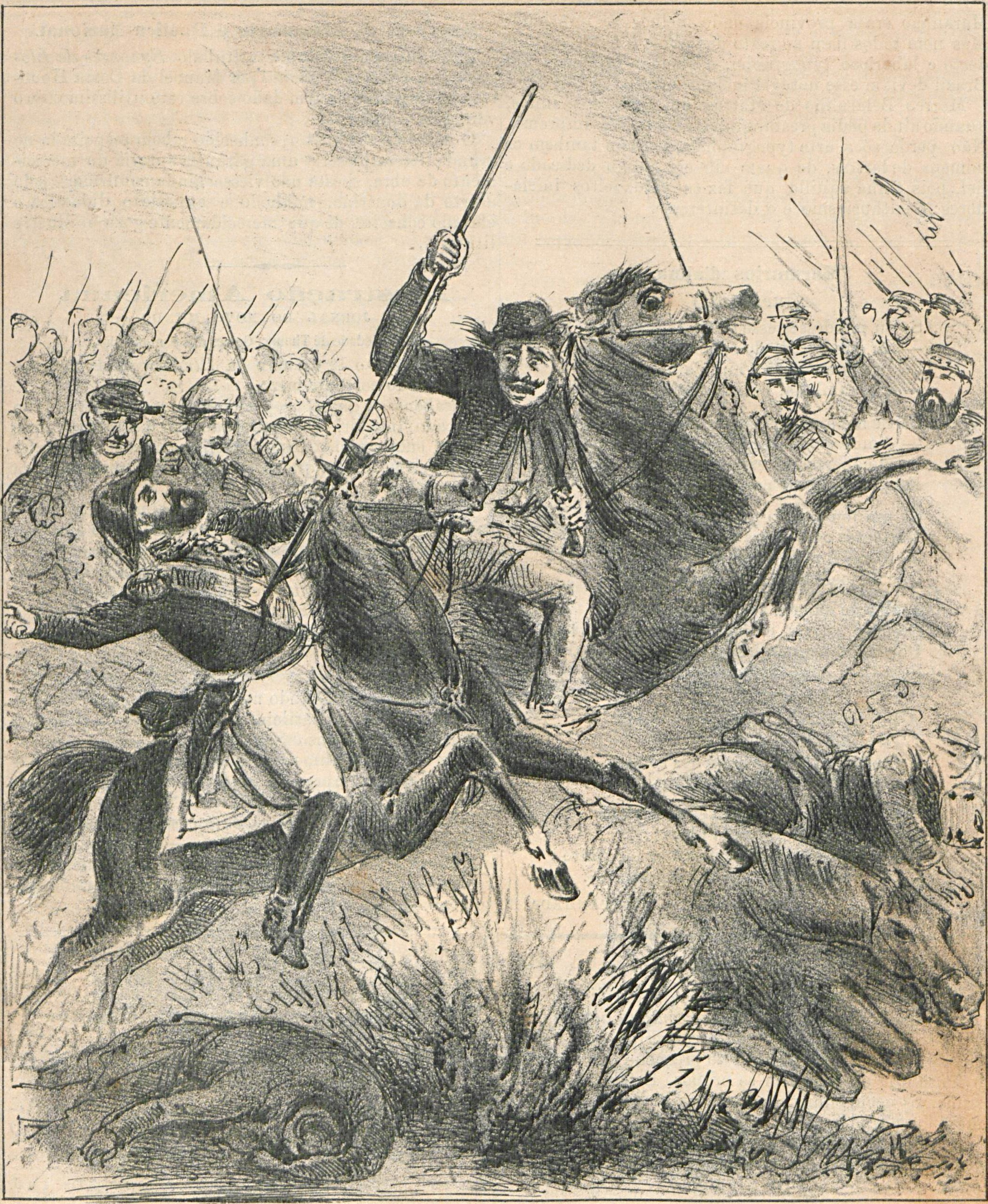
- Corporal José Francisco Lacerda, known as Chico Diabo (Devil Frank), wounding Solano López with a spear
Date	1 March 1870
Location	Cerro Corá, Paraguay 22°39′8″S 56°1′31″W
Result	Brazilian victory

Belligerents
Paraguay	Empire of Brazil

Commanders and leaders
(Paraguay) Solano López †; (Paraguay) Domingo Sánchez †; (Paraguay) Juan López †; (Paraguay) Crisóstomo Centurión	(Empire of Brazil) Correia da Câmara; (Empire of Brazil) Alfredo Pinheiro; (Empire of Brazil) Joca Tavares

Strength
412–416; 2 cannons	2,600

Casualties and losses
340: 100 killed 240 captured	7 wounded

The Battle of Cerro Corá (Spanish pronunciation: [ˈsero koˈɾa]) was the last major battle of the Paraguayan War, fought on 1 March 1870, in the vicinity of Cerro Corá, 454 kilometres (280 mi) northeast of Paraguay's capital Asunción. It is known for being the battle in which Francisco Solano López, Paraguayan president, was killed at the hands of the Imperial Brazilian Army.

The Paraguayan War was dragging on for more than five years and, after numerous battles, the Paraguayan army had been reduced to the elderly, the sick and children. The battle of Acosta Ñu was the last major combat of the war, which from then on was restricted to occasional skirmishes in the final months of 1869 and beginning of 1870. During this period, the Count of Eu, the allied commander-in-chief, organized expeditions in search of Solano López, following the path his column had taken. Along the way, López's and Eu's men made the civilian population suffer, either because of alleged conspiracies against López, or because of the looting and mistreatment inflicted by imperial troops. On 8 February 1870, López and his column reached Cerro Corá.

Conditions in the camp were deplorable, with the five hundred people who accompanied López in extreme hunger. In Cerro Corá, one head of cattle was slaughtered a day to feed everyone. The defensive positions organized by López were deficient, and to this was added the weak armament present. Brazilian troops, with about 2,600 men under the command of general José Antônio Correia da Câmara, approached and surrounded the camp, without López's knowledge. On 1 March they attacked on two sides: from the front and from the rear. The two defensive points, on the Tacuara and Aquidaban streams, quickly fell and the assault on the camp lasted a few minutes, with the resistance dispersing soon after.

López was surrounded by the Brazilians and, after refusing to surrender, was wounded with a spear by corporal Francisco Lacerda, fleeing into the forest soon after. General Câmara followed him and found him close to the Aquidaban stream, where he again refused to surrender, being shot by João Soares. The facts surrounding his death are shrouded in disagreements and inaccuracies. The battle ended soon after, with about 100 Paraguayans killed, 240 captured and seven Brazilians wounded. Time has given rise to interpretations of López's figure, portraying him both as a cruel tyrant and as a great Paraguayan leader. Over the years, the name Cerro Corá would become part of Paraguayan culture, baptizing streets, buildings, a national park, in addition to being the title of a feature film from 1978.

== Background ==
=== The war ===
The Paraguayan War was the largest armed conflict in South America, involving Argentina, the Empire of Brazil, and Uruguay against Paraguay. It began in November 1864, when Solano López ordered the capture of the Brazilian steamer Marquês de Olinda, which was steaming on the Paraguay River and carrying the president of the province of Mato Grosso, Frederico Carneiro de Campos. In December of the same year, López ordered the invasion of this province. At the same time, the Paraguayan president coordinated military offensives that eventually led to the invasion of Corrientes, in Argentina, and the invasion of Rio Grande do Sul, in Brazil. This hostile act prompted the formation of the Triple Alliance, on 1 May 1865, between the invaded countries and Uruguay. The Paraguayan attack on Corrientes and Rio Grande do Sul proved to be a military failure, forcing López's troops to retreat into their territory, going from attacking to being attacked by Triple Alliance. In the meantime, the naval Battle of Riachuelo took place, in which the Imperial Brazilian Navy dealt a major defeat to the Paraguayan Navy that destroyed almost its entire fleet, imposed a naval blockade and isolated the country from the outside world.

On 24 May 1866, already in Paraguayan territory, the biggest pitched battle of the entire war took place, the Battle of Tuyutí, which involved about 55,000 men, 32,000 allies and 23,000 Paraguayans. In this battle the allies triumphed, but were close to being defeated, given the surprise Paraguayan attack. The latter suffered about thirteen thousand casualties. Months later, the Battle of Curupayty was fought, characterized as being the biggest allied defeat, with the loss of approximately four thousand soldiers. About two years later, the allies won an important victory at the Fortress of Humaitá. The site was a strategic point and its conquest allowed the occupation of the Paraguayan capital, Asunción, on 1 January 1869. After the occupation of the city, Luís Alves de Lima e Silva, the Marquess of Caxias, until then the allied commander-in-chief, deemed the war over and withdrew from the conflict. He was replaced by Gaston, the Count of Eu, who continued the last phase of the war, known as the Cordilleras Campaign. At this stage, the fighting took place against what was left of López's army: mostly sick, elderly and children, as evidenced at the Battle of Acosta Ñu.

=== The hunt for Solano Lopez ===
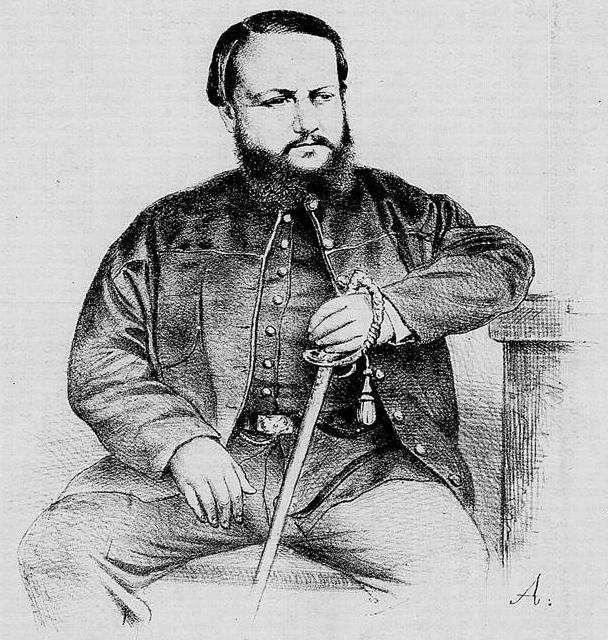
Francisco Solano López with the clothes he was killed in (drawing by Angelo Agostini, based on a photograph taken by Domingo Parodi days before the battle of Cerro Corá)

The battles of Piribebuy and Acosta Ñu were the last two major clashes of the war. What was left of the Paraguayan soldiers who took part in them joined Solano López, before heading to the Hondo stream. From there, the column marched to the village of Caraguatay, where the Paraguayan president proclaimed it the fourth capital of the country. At this point, the numerical superiority of the allies allowed them to organize three columns, with the intention of flanking Lopez's column, reaching the three paths that led to Caraguatay. The first column, the 2nd Army Corps under the command of marshal Vitorino José Carneiro Monteiro, coming from Campo Grande, advanced along the trail of Caaguijurú, on the central path of the village. The second column, a mixed force of Argentines and Brazilians commanded by generals Emílio Mitre and José Auto da Silva Guimarães, advanced to the right of the first column. On the left marched the 1st Army Corps commanded directly by the Count of Eu. Dionísio Cerqueira, at the time an ensign in Vitorino's column, witnessed a scene, which he called a "horrible scene", when they approached the trail. Some Brazilian soldiers were found mutilated and hanged from tree branches, over bonfires that had charred their feet. According to Cerqueira, such a scene "filled the soldiers with indignation".

On 18 August 1869, general Vitorino's column reached the road at Caaguijurú where there were about 1,200 entrenched Paraguayans. A quick combat ensued, with the Brazilians motivated to avenge their fallen comrades; the Paraguayans suffered a complete defeat. Also in revenge, general Vitorino authorized the beheading of the Paraguayan officers who survived the battle, a little over 16 men. On the next day, the three columns reached Caraguatay, whose residents suffered at the hands of the Brazilian troops. By this time, López had already fled, crossing the Salladilo stream, near the Manduvirá river. In the village, the Brazilians were received by 80 women and children who managed to escape from a kind of concentration camp called Espadín, a place used by López to imprison the "destinadas", women who were accused of treason. The Count of Eu then dispatched a cavalry force there, under the command of colonel Moura; upon arriving at Espadín he found and rescued about 1,200 women and children in a state of misery. Upon learning of the presence of the Brazilians, the women were elated with joy, moved by their release. It was very common, in the search for Solano López, to find starving women, dressed in rags, who begged with outstretched hands for flour or meat.

The allies wanted to maintain pressure on López, with the goal of preventing the reorganization of his forces. Therefore, still on 18 August, the Argentine general Mitre sent a force of Brazilian cavalry to march in pursuit of López's column, with the general joining it the next day. That day they reached Manduvirá, advancing until they reached the Salladilo stream, joining the Argentine regiment San Martín, which was in the Paraguayan rear, but López had already moved from there. On 20 August, a small Brazilian force, under the command of colonel Carlos Neri, faced the rearguard of the Paraguayans in the Hondo stream, about 30 kilometers from Caraguatay, but decided to camp there along with the rest of Mitre's troops. The next day they advanced on the Paraguayans, but before attacking, general Mitre sent a note to the Paraguayan commander demanding their surrender within thirty minutes, under the guarantee that they would live and return home. But if they refused, even the eventual prisoners would be beheaded, causing surprise both for Solano López, who was outraged by the note, and for the Count of Eu, who said he had been unaware of the incident, due to the novelty of the content of the message. At the end of the term, the Brazilians found that the Paraguayans had taken advantage of the given time to flee.

During the escape, López began to discover alleged plots by his subordinates to kill him. On 27 August, three Paraguayan spies, colonel Hilario Marcó and 86 other soldiers were executed. On 7 September, the column camped near the Capiibary stream, where López ordered the death of a few more soldiers who supposedly were involved in the conspiracy. When passing through this route, the Brazilian troops found the bones and more than one hundred skulls of these Paraguayans. New battles took place between the Brazilians and Paraguayans on 21 September, in the town of San Isidoro (in the current district of Curuguaty) and on the next day, in Hurucuatí, near the town of San Joaquín, all won by the Brazilians, the latter being occupied by the troops. In pursuit of the remnants, captain Pedro Werlang reported seeing hundreds of dead people lying on the road, murdered because they were exhausted and sick. They were men, women and children, killed to avoid being captured by the Brazilians. In October, the 1st Brazilian Army Corps remained in Caraguatay and the 2nd Corps occupied San Joaquín. There were Argentine soldiers and some anti-López Paraguayans in both armies, but the Argentine forces withdrew, leaving only 800 men in that region. The few Uruguayan soldiers in Paraguay were camped on Cerro León. From then on, it was up to the Brazilians to capture Solano López.

On 26 September, the Count of Eu was having difficulties in maneuvering his army in pursuit of the Paraguayan president, due to constant supply issues, and in order not to let López escape through the interior, he divided his forces into small vanguards. One of these, under the command of Fidélis Pais da Silva, reached and captured the town of Curuguaty on the 28th. Meanwhile, a column of 2,600 men from Concepción, led by general José Antônio Correia da Câmara, guarded the Mato Grosso border to prevent López from crossing the Paraguay River to the right bank. López's column headed east towards the Maracaju Mountain Range at the end of December. In the first months of 1870, the Brazilians found out that López was in this region, heading towards Ponta Porã, then deviating towards Chiriguelo. From there, López and the few remnants of his army headed for Cerro Corá. (Note: Before Brazilian troops attacked Cerro Corá, there were three battles in 1870: Capture of the Rio Verde trench, Capture of Cambaceguá Redoubt and the Battle of Lomaruguá.)

=== Cerro Corá encampment ===
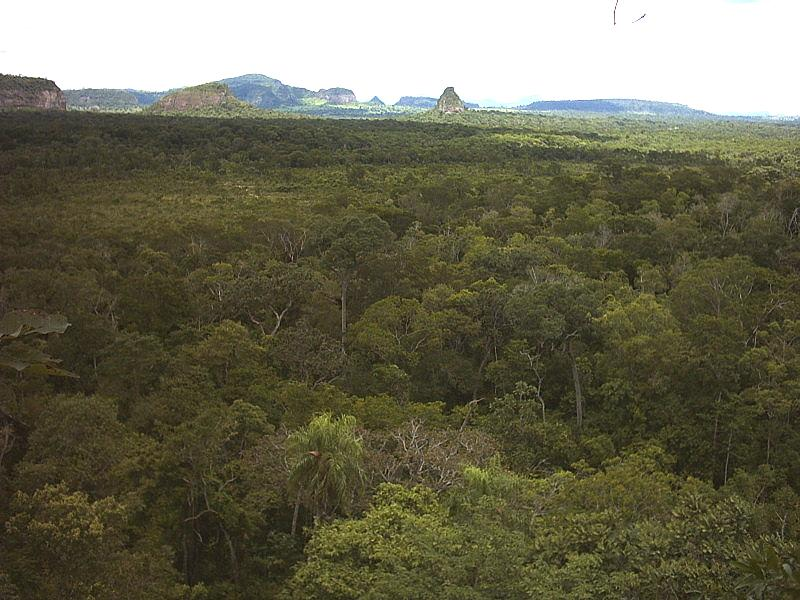
Cerro Corá, as seen from Cerro Muralla hill

On 8 February 1870, Solano López and his column, consisting of about 500 people, including vice president Domingo Sánchez, generals Bernardino Caballero, Isidoro Resquín, Francisco Roa and José María Delgado, as well as women and children, all hungry and ragged, armed mainly with spears and swords, arrived at Cerro Corá, a place of dense forest and rocky outcrops, located 454 kilometers northeast of Asunción.

To the north, south and west was the Aquidaban river and the Aquidabá-nigüi stream, its tributary. The place chosen by López to camp was nicknamed the "circus of gigantic rocks" by one of his followers. Due to the particularity of its location, Cerro Corá was a region that favored defense, if this was carried out by troops in good condition; otherwise, it was a trap, as there were only two ways to reach the camp; the road that crossed the Tacuara stream and the Aquidaban river, in the northwest, and the road that came from Brazilian territory, passing through Bela Vista, Dourados, Capivari and Ponta Porã, ending in Chiriguelo in the southeast.

As soon as they arrived, López began preparations to set up camp. The places where the headquarters, most of the Rifle Battalion, the Escort Squadron, the troops and the carts should be established were chosen. Accommodation was extremely precarious, limited to huts for the entire camp. Parallel to this was the condition of the troops, most of whom were sick, in addition to being insufficient to form a secure a defensive perimeter. López was aware of this, even so he ordered a precarious protection for the place. He selected ninety men and two small calibre cannons to guard the Tacuara stream. He left another hundred men and some artillery pieces at the Aquidaban river, under the command of general Francisco Roa.

Hunger punished the few who were with López. Faced with this situation, on 12 February, general Bernadino Caballero and forty other men were ordered to cross the border with Brazil in order to steal cattle and horses from the Military Colony of Dourados. On another front, with the same purpose, sergeant major Julián Lara and twelve men were sent to the fields of Aquidaban, marching on foot. Due to famine, practically everything was used from the cattle, including their hides. One animal was slaughtered a day to feed the 500 people in the camp.

On 25 February, López met with his staff to debunk a rumor that he was going to flee to Bolivia. At this meeting, ribbons of fabric from the Amambay medal were given with the words: Venció penúrias y fatigas (You overcame hardships and fatigues). It was minted in gold and silver with diamonds and rubies. Such an award raised the troop's low morale a little. As had happened since the beginning of the conflict, the Paraguayan president had never communicated his war plans. Therefore, nothing corroborates the theory that López chose Cero Corá as the site of the last battle of the war. Still, it is recorded that the Paraguayan leader ordered the chiefs of the remaining columns to move there. Most of the columns disobeyed this order, allowing themselves to be captured or fleeing into the woods. Already in the final days of February, the 412 soldiers and officers, in addition to Solano López, found themselves surrounded, without knowing it, by the imperial troops of general José Antônio Correia da Câmara.

=== Imperial attack column ===
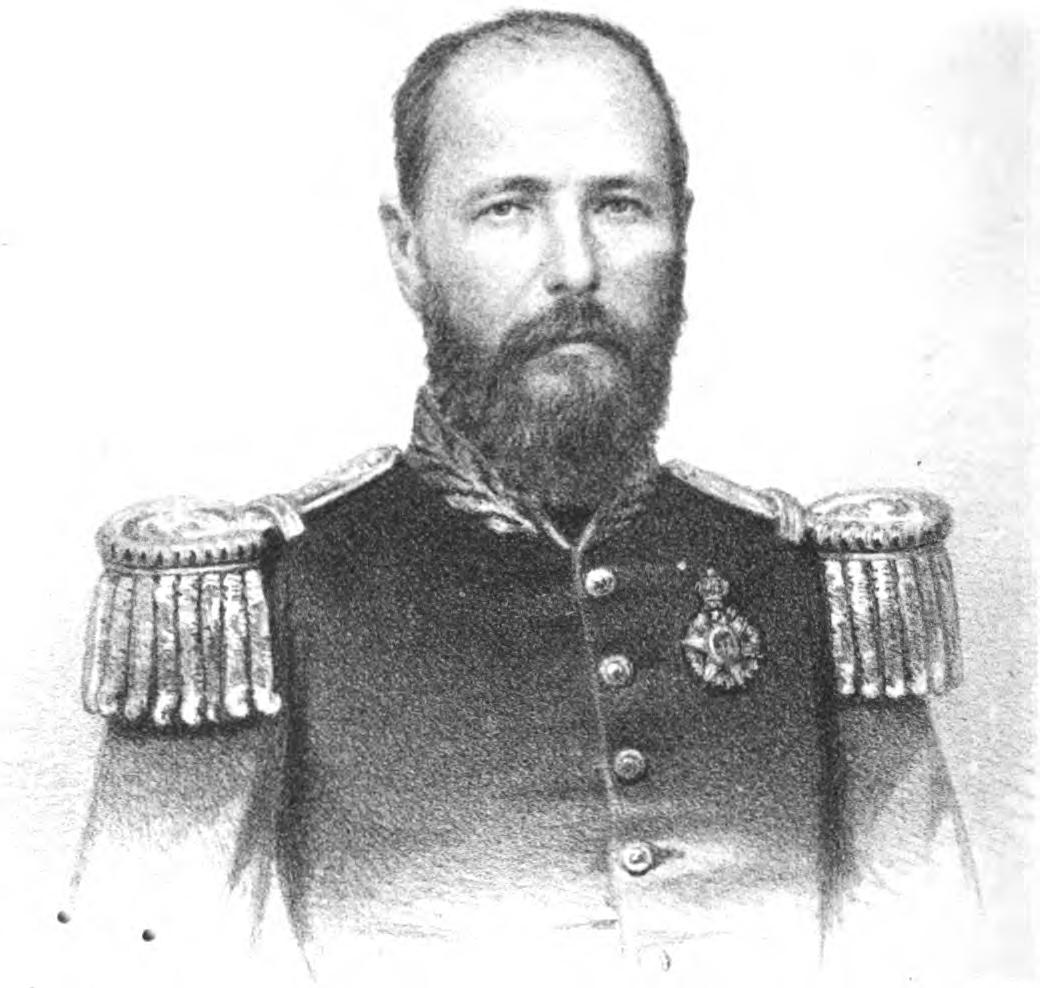
General José Antônio Correia da Câmara in 1870

On 18 February, an imperial column of 2,000 or 2,600 men, under the command of Correia da Câmara, was on the march near Bela Vista. Câmara learned that López's camp was on Cerro Corá from colonel Bento Martins. Such information was obtained through Paraguayan deserters and prisoners. Unlike López's men, the Brazilian column was very well armed, equipped and fed. In view of the information passed on by deserters, Câmara believed that the Paraguayan column was heading for Dourados, in Mato Grosso. The Brazilian general then planned a two-pronged attack: the bulk of the troops, under the command of Antônio Paranhos, would attack from the front, on the Concepción-Bella Vista-Dourados road, while Câmara would advance from the rear.

On 26 February, the imperial forces advanced towards the Paraguayan camp, with the information that these forces were in a deplorable state, that Solano López was not aware of their approach and that the defensive positions were weak. On 28 February, the troops camped on the Guazú stream, where the Paraguayan column had passed. From there, the final attack was organized.

== Battle ==
=== Capture of the defensive positions ===
On 1 March 1870, at six o'clock in the morning, López was informed that the defense of the Tacuara stream had been attacked; this information was passed on to the defense of Aquidaban. The attack was confirmed by fleeing soldiers heading towards the central camp, shouting that the "negros" had arrived. In Tacuara, the imperial forces, under the command of lieutenant colonel Francisco Antônio Martins, attacked from the rear with bayonets, quickly capturing the artillery, which did not fire a single shot. The attack was successful due to advance information, coming from deserters in the camp, about where the attack would be most effective. Since there was no artillery fire, information about the loss of Tacuara took some time to reach López. He then sent 10 men, under the command of lieutenant colonel Candido Solís, to see what was happening in that position, but they were massacred on the way. Due to their delay in returning, López entrusted the same mission to colonel Juan Crisóstomo Centurión and commander Angel Riveros. As soon as the order was given, shots were heard from the defense of Aquidaban, a few kilometers from Tacuara. Despite the defensive artillery fire, no Brazilians were hit and this position was also taken with ease.

Centurión and Rivera started to gallop towards Aquidaban, but turned back before they got there and informed López that the position too had been attacked. Faced with this situation, López met with his officers and discussed the action they should take: surrender or fight, the latter being chosen. López then distributed his forces throughout the camp and they headed 700 meters towards Aquidaban. At the moment when Centurión and Rivera informed López about the fall of the position, imperial cavalry reached Cerro Corá and surrounded the camp in a pincer movement, spearing and sabering whoever they found, closing the siege at the mouth of the Chiriguelo trail. There general Francisco Roa was fighting, being killed after refusing to surrender.

=== Attack on the camp ===
The attack on the Cerro Corá camp lasted only 15 minutes. At noon, the imperial forces made up of cavalry and infantry, under the command of colonel João Nunes da Silva Tavares, advanced towards the center of the camp, meeting Solano López who was mounted on a horse, Juan Francisco Solano López, known as Panchito, who was López's 15-year-old son and was granted the rank of colonel, some officers and the battered rifle battalion. Even with little ammunition and guns, Centurión commanded a group of one hundred riflemen, organizing them in guerrilla tactics. López and other officers positioned themselves behind the riflemen. Upon entering the camp, the Brazilians found many soldiers, old, young, sick, almost naked and semi-unarmed, and stopped the attack.

The Paraguayan resistance received some encouragement from the presence of López and his officers. But during the aimless shootout, colonel Centurión was hit by a projectile that shattered his lower jaw, splitting his tongue in two. López then started to escape from his position at a short gallop, due to the swampy terrain, to the center of the camp, where his base was located, putting an end to the resistance that soon dispersed, thus ending the battle. Even after the silence of Paraguayan guns, imperial troops that still penetrated the esplanade of the camp killed any Paraguayan they reached, including those who had surrendered.

=== Death of officers ===
During the escape of López and his family, the cart carrying his wife Eliza Lynch stayed behind, about three hundred meters away, and his son Panchito returned to escort her. At this moment, he was reached by an imperial cavalrymen and ordered to surrender by lieutenant colonel Francisco Antônio Martins. Even his mother urged him to surrender to the Brazilians, but he refused to do so. He started to fight with his saber, until he was hit by a bullet. At this point, after jumping and covering her son's body, Elisa Lynch is said to have exclaimed: "¿Ésta es la civilización que han prometido?" (Is this the civilization you have promised?), a reference to the allies' claim that they intended to free Paraguay from tyranny and bring freedom and civilization to the country. According to Paraguayan oral tradition, Panchito would have said "un coronel paraguayo no se rinde, jamás" (a Paraguayan colonel never surrenders) before being killed.

Surgeon Estigarribia, who was wounded in the leg, was killed with a spear. Colonel José Maria Aguiar, also suffering the same wound, was beheaded two hours after the end of the fighting while trying to flee. Vice president Domingo Sánchez was pierced by captain Azambuja's spear, despite the protests of an Argentine soldier. He would have said: Rendirme, yo? Jamás! (Give up, me? Never!).

=== Remnants ===
General Bernadino Caballero and his 54 soldiers were not in the camp during the battle. They had been sent to forage by López and crossed the border with Brazil, by the Apa river. The column of colonel Bento Martins was in his pursuit. On 4 April, the Brazilian forces found and attacked them at the Cândido Oliveira farm, in the Miranda Military Colony. Caballero fled from the region and lost his sword. Hernâni Donato does not register casualties in this action in either of the two sides. On 8 April, the Paraguayans were in the village of Bela Vista, still resisting, but general Caballero was convinced that Solano López was dead and surrendered, along with 54 soldiers, to major Francisco Xavier Marques. These were the last Paraguayan soldiers to surrender.

== Death of Solano López ==
=== Prelude ===
The account of Francisco Solano López's death is surrounded by some disagreements and inaccuracies about what, in fact, happened during the events inside the forest, where he fled. Even so, there are common points in the accounts of Paraguayan and Brazilian officers and combatants. After the defeat of his riflemen, López went to the headquarters, in the center of the camp, and from there, together with Colonel Silverio Aveiro, Major Manuel Cabrera and Lieutenant Ignacio Ibarra, all on horseback, they tried to flee, but were overtaken by some Brazilian cavalrymen, on the left, which prevented a flight to the Aquidabán-nigüí stream. In this act, the Brazilian called for Solano López to surrender.

The Brazilian closed in to arrest him. Two soldiers, one on each side, tried to hold him, but López tried to wound one of them with his ceremonial sword, being retaliated with an axe blow to his head, but he was cushioned by the Panama hat he was wearing. One of the imperial cavalrymen got off his horse and pierced López with the spear he was holding, from bottom to top, reaching the right groin and reaching the entrails, fatally compromising the peritoneum, intestine, and bladder. This cavalryman was José Francisco Lacerda, known as Chico Diabo (Devil Frank), who was 22 years old and belonged to the regiment of Colonel João Nunes da Silva Tavares, of the 19th Provisional Cavalry Corps.

Captain Francisco Argüello and Lieutenant Chamorro arrived to help López, facing the Brazilians with sabers, but due to numerical inferiority and physical conditions, they were defeated, being seriously injured. Despite the victory in this clash, no Brazilian soldier approached López, remaining at a distance of ten meters and waiting for instructions from a superior. Even with the imperial presence, Colonel Aveiro managed to get close to López and helped him mount his horse and drove him into the forest, opening the way with his own body, following the footprints and traces left by Paraguayan soldiers that previously went there search of fruits. They soon approached the Aquidabán-nigüí stream, when the Paraguayan president fell from his horse. Aveiro, Cabrera and Ibarra helped him cross the stream, but were unable to make him climb the opposite bank due to his weight. At this point, the three men abandoned López as Correia da Câmara and two Imperial soldiers arrived.

=== General Câmara's report ===
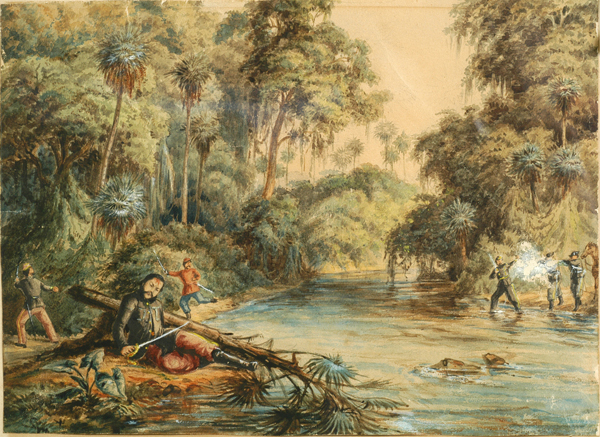
The death of Francisco Solano López on the banks of the Aquidaban, by Adolfo Methfessel

Solano López's final moments were witnessed by few if any Paraguayan soldiers and by only a few Brazilian ones, including Brazilian General Correia da Câmara. At the end of the war, Câmara wrote three contradictory reports on the death of López. Câmara wrote the first military report to marshal Vitorino José Carneiro Monteiro, called "parte", still on 1 March, declaring, twice, that López had been killed in front of him because he did not accept to surrender, despite being "completely defeated and severely wounded".

In a second report, dated 13 March, Câmara suggested that López had died of his wounds, for when he summoned him to surrender, he received a sword blow in response. After that Câmara ordered a soldier to disarm López at the moment "when he exhaled the last torment". In the third, a longer and more detailed report released by the Brazilian government, General Câmara said that he found Major José Simeão de Oliveira and the latter informed him that López had "dismounted and gone into the forest", already wounded during the persecution he had faced. Câmara then set off in pursuit of López along with two Brazilian soldiers, finding López on the bank of the Aquidabán-nigüín stream, laying on the opposite bank. In his company there were two Paraguayan officers who were promptly killed for displaying an offensive stance.

Still in this last report, Câmara stated that he called for López to surrender two or three times, at least: "Marshal, hand over your sword. I, the general who commands these forces, guarantee you the rest of your life". The answer would have been: "No me rindo, ni entrego mi espada, muero con ella y por mi patria" (I do not surrender nor deliver my sword, I die with it and for my country), after having struck the air with his sword. Câmara immediately ordered a soldier to disarm him. In this act, López would have been on his stomach, with his face facing the water, and began to struggle. With a lot of effort, he managed to raise his head a little "to exhale his last breath". Therefore, in this report, General Câmara suggested that López had died in the act of being disarmed and arrested, without injury in the forest.

=== Colonel Silva Tavares' report ===
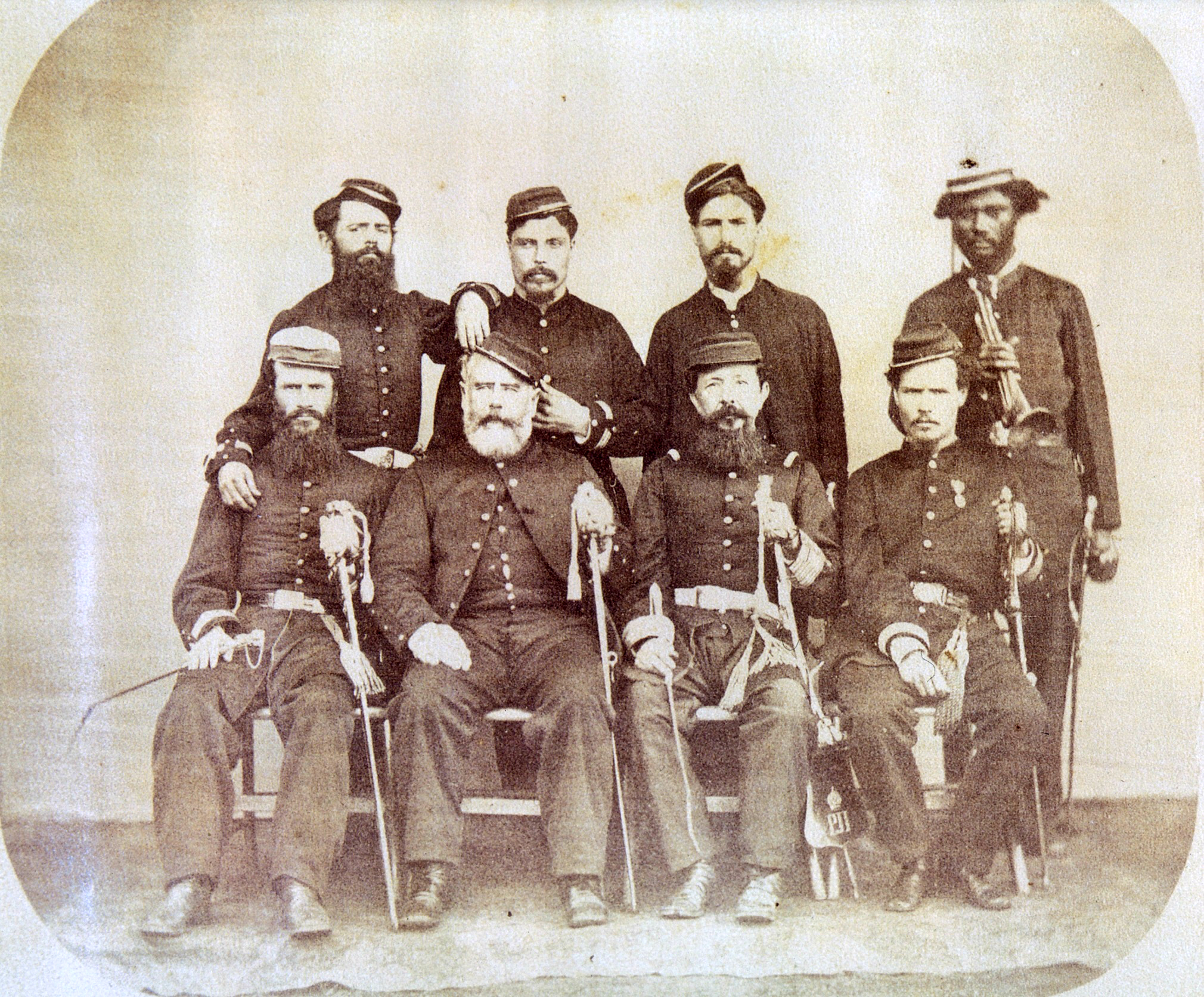
Then colonel João Nunes da Silva Tavares, known as Joca Tavares (second sitting, from left to right) and his immediate assistants, including Francisco Lacerda, better known as Chico Diabo (third standing, from left to right)

The then general João Nunes da Silva Tavares decided to respond to an article published by Correia da Câmara in the Gazeta de Porto Alegre newspaper, on 8 March 1880, about the death of Solano López. He was outraged by Câmara's proposal, that the Paraguayan president would have a gunshot wound in his belly resulting from a natural shootout, while he was trying to cross the stream, omitting the fact that he had been wounded in this part of the body by a spear. According to Silva Tavares, such a report was opposed "to the truth of the facts". He declared that general Câmara received his official report on 2 March 1870, which reported that López had fled into the forest, already wounded by the spear of his subordinate, corporal Francisco Lacerda.

To prove his statement, Silva Tavares mentioned that he had requested a medical report, with the purpose of certifying the nature of López's injuries, for surgeons Costa Lobo and Barbosa Lisboa. The result of the exam came out only on 25 March, 12 days after Câmara's second report. In this report, the doctors pointed out three wounds: a wound in the frontal region of about seven centimeters, probably caused by a poleaxe. A wound, probably caused by a four-centimeter spear, directed obliquely from bottom to top, fatally irremediable to the marshal's life, compromising the peritoneum, bladder and intestine. And finally, a wound caused by a rifle bullet in the dorsal region, with no way out, since the bullet was lodged in the ribcage.

Câmara omitted this last wound completely. Silva Tavares continued his account: "then the general (Câmara) dismounted, went into the woods, and not far away found López leaning against the bank of the river, with part of his body immersed in the water, with the sword in his hand crossed over his head. the gourd, holding the tip of the sword with the left hand". Silva Tavares proposed that López was ordered to surrender and replied: "I die for my homeland with a sword in my hand". Silva Tavares said that at the moment he was being disarmed, López received a rifle shot, but did not mention who fired it. Such a statement is corroborated by the Viscount of Taunay. According to Taunay, at the moment the marshal was disarmed, a cavalryman came running and fired a shot at close range that would have reached López's heart.

=== Bounty ===
The death of Solano López was, in a sense, desirable by the imperial high command, since Silva Tavares would have offered one hundred pounds to whoever killed López in combat. Emperor Pedro II himself clung to the destitution of the Paraguayan president, not accepting any kind of negotiation. The province of Maranhão had also offered an even higher prize to whoever executed the "tyrant" in combat.

Silva Tavares gave all the credit for the death of Solano López to corporal Francisco Lacerda from his regiment, diverging years later. Lacerda would have received one hundred heifers from his superior in Bagé, going down in history as the man that killed López. The Brazilian soldiery even created a clever ditty in honor of his feat: "O cabo Chico Diabo do Diabo Chico deu cabo" (Corporal Devil Frank has finished off Frank the Devil). However, the author of the shot that actually killed López was João Soares, a cavalryman. Soares also claimed the bounty, but with no officer to defend him, his name was forgotten. Parts of Solano López's body, such as an ear, teeth, and a finger, were torn off by imperial soldiers as trophies.

== Aftermath ==
=== Immediately after the battle ===
With the end of the battle and the death of Solano López, the war was over. After years of conflict and struggle, Brazilian troops were euphoric and lost self-control. The soldiers began to kill innocent people and set fire to the camp, killing the sick and wounded there. About 240 Paraguayan prisoners were taken, including generals Resquín and Delgado, with probably more than a hundred dead. Among the Brazilians there were only seven wounded. On 2 March, Brazilian troops took the prisoners to the village of Concepción.

On 4 March, news of Solano López's death reached Concepción, where the Count of Eu was. The count could finally return to Rio de Janeiro. A celebratory ball was held, attended by the best families among the town's population, who seemed to be happy with López's death, as well as anti-López Paraguayan officials. In Rio de Janeiro, the news of López's death was received with great joy. Emperor Pedro II recovered his shaky popularity, and on the night of the arrival of the news, he, his wife and princess Isabel walked through the streets of the city, which were full of people, well lit and decorated with flags. Pedro rejected the offer of merchants to erect a statue of himself, advising them to use the resources to build schools. The Count of Eu arrived in Rio de Janeiro on 29 April with a large popular demonstration promoted by the liberals to the detriment of the achievements of Caxias, who was a conservative, presenting Manuel Luís Osório and the Count of Eu as the winners of the war.

=== Paraguay ===
At the end of the war, the country was devastated, in addition to having lost territories disputed with the neighboring countries. The defeat, according to Doratioto, caused "the definitive rupture of a model of economic growth that meant, at the time, the bases for a formidable capitalist expansion throughout the national [productive] system". Even after decades, the country has not been able to maintain a pre-war growth pace compared to its neighbors.

The destruction of the Paraguayan economy was such that the size of its impact was only known when nations such as Argentina and Uruguay were economically consolidated, in addition to the waves of immigration from Europe. Sources differ on human losses, but on average statistics vary from 8.7% to 69% of a population that accounted for between 285,715 and 450,000 inhabitants. This meant that the dead were between 28,286 at the minimum and 278,649 at the maximum. The country was militarily occupied until 13 May 1876 when the last 1,894 Brazilian soldiers were withdrawn.

=== Allies ===
The Empire of Brazil sent about 139,000 soldiers to Paraguay, 1.5% of its population at the time, and more than 50,000 died and about 10,000 became disabled. There was a sense of patriotism among the population, which filled the ranks at the start of the war. In large urban centers, flags and the national anthem had become part of people's daily lives. The emperor's figure was strengthened. The issue of navigability on the Paraguay River was resolved, putting an end to the threat of isolation for the province of Mato Grosso. However, financially, the country suffered years of economic retraction, due to huge expenses of the war, which cost about eleven years of the country's annual public budget; this would explain the constant deficit between the 1870s and 1880s. In addition, there was a consolidation of the army like never before. This institution was responsible, years later, for the coup that would lead to the fall of the monarchy and the establishment of the republic.

Argentina lost between dead and wounded about 18,000 of the 30,000 men it sent to war. During the conflict, the country suffered from internal disputes against the central government, all of which were repressed by Bartolomé Mitre. In the economic field, the country benefited from the sale of meat to Allied troops, with several ranchers, such as Justo José de Urquiza, becoming richer. Uruguay sent 5,583 soldiers to war, losing 3,120. As in Argentina, the war was unpopular in the country, failing to put an end to the internal tension that existed there.

== Legacy ==
=== Revisionism ===
Over the years after the death of Solano López, the construction of a myth around his figure began, varying according to the time in which it took place. At first, the view of the victors prevailed; in it López was a tyrant, the sole responsible for the war and the destruction of his country, reducing it to a mere tributary of the Empire of Brazil and Argentina. At the end of the 19th century and the beginning of the 20th century, thoughts that disagreed with this first interpretation emerged, accusing the Empire of Brazil as the responsible for the war, in the figure of Brazilian republican positivists opposed to the monarchical regime.

In the 1960s, a new interpretation of the Paraguayan leader emerged among left-wing Latin American movements, which exalted López as a great statesman and anti-imperialist military leader. According to such revisionism, López was a leader who fought international imperialism, which had transformed pre-war Paraguay into a progressive country, modernizing it and bringing social welfare to the population, fleeing the capitalist pretensions of the United Kingdom. According to this idea, Argentina and Brazil had been manipulated by the British Empire to annihilate Paraguayan autonomous development.

From the 1980s onwards, new interpretations of the war emerged, contradicting previous revisionism that the British had influenced it. Such an approach points to England trying to avoid it, exemplified by a letter from the British diplomat in Buenos Aires Edward Thornton to the Paraguayan government, offering his services to avoid a conflict between Brazil and Paraguay. It is argued that there is no evidence that the British Empire actively engaged in the Paraguayan defeat. In fact, there was a total lack of knowledge and interest among the British about what happened in that country, as highlighted by British writer and diplomat Richard Francis Burton. According to historian Leslie Bethell, the Paraguayan War was a regional civil war with an international dimension, where responsibility for the conflict lay with all four countries directly involved. This interpretation leads to the argument that local factors, such as internal and external disputes between the nations of the La Plata basin, would have influenced the conflict.

=== Historical ===
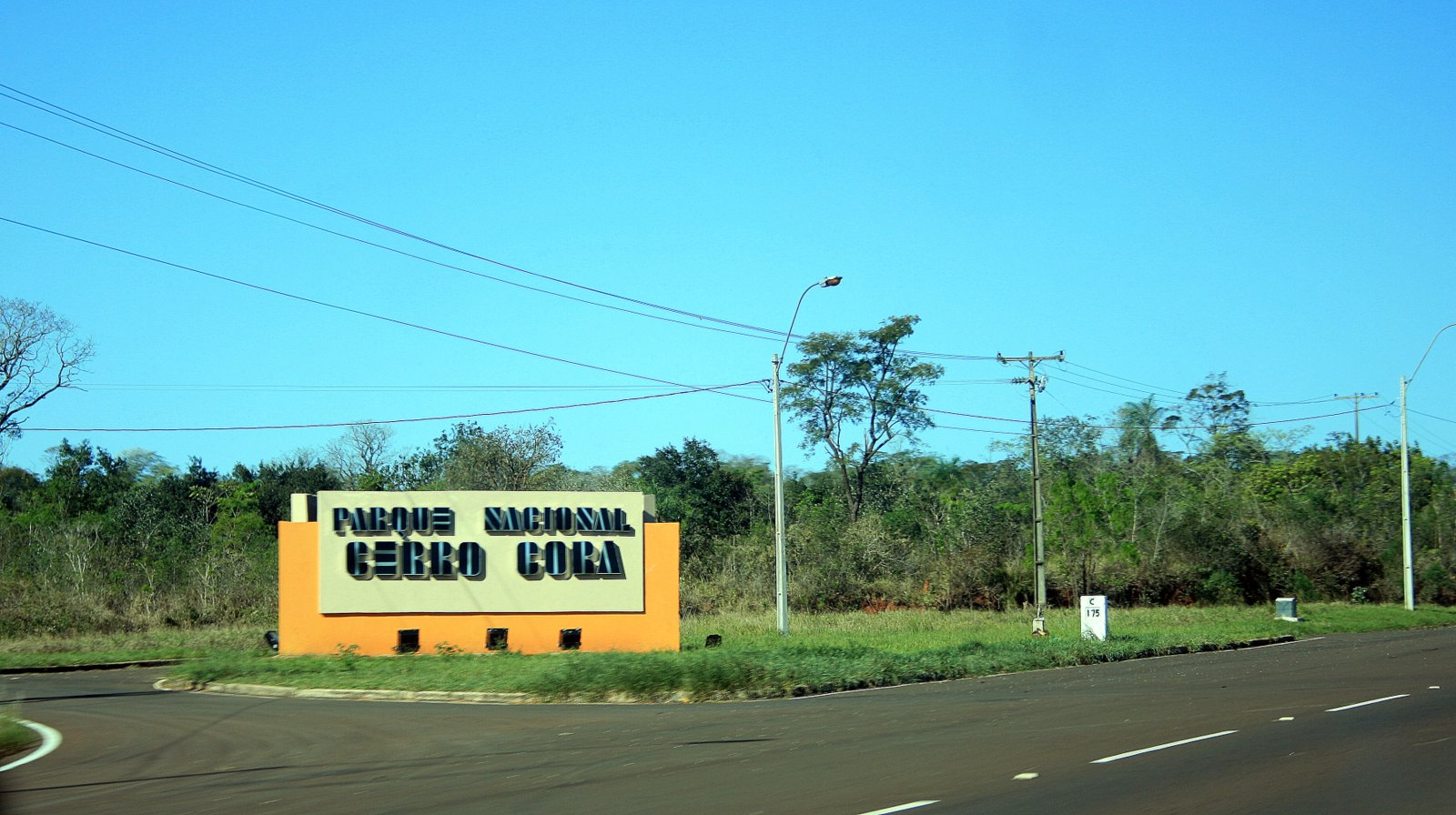
Entrance to Cerro Corá National Park

Right after the death of Solano López and the end of the Battle of Cerro Corá until the end of the 19th century, there was no question among the Paraguayan survivors that their president had recklessly embarked on a war with neighboring countries. These hated him to the point of developing the idea that the causes of the conflict rested on him. However, as time went by, new views on war, the so-called revisionism, developed.

In the 21st century, Cerro Corá, a name that gives the idea of a surrounded mountainous range, became present in various fields of Paraguayan culture. Several streets, shops and companies in the country bear the name. In addition, Cerro Corá has become a synonym of bravery and martyrdom of the Paraguayan people, represented in the figure of president Solano López. Still in Paraguay, 1 March is "Heroes' Day", with activities throughout the month commemorating the battles of the so-called Guerra de los 70. In Brazil, Cerro Corá represented the victorious end to a long and hard war, even if it was little propagated. To honor the Brazilian soldiers who fought there, a municipality in Rio Grande do Norte was given the name Cerro Corá in 1953. In 2011, a search on Google Maps for the term Cerro Corá returned ten streets, an avenue and an alley in Brazil.

In 1960, the region of the battle became an army-controlled reserve. On 11 February 1976, under Decree No. 20,698, the Cerro Corá National Park was created. The current region is located within the municipality of Pedro Juan Caballero, capital of the Department of Amambay. There are several monuments in the area that record the development of the battles of the war, in addition to the places where Solano López and his son Panchito died, marked with a bust and a tombstone.

=== Cultural ===
In 1978, a film of the same name about the battle was produced in Paraguay. Cerro Corá, directed by Guillermo Vera, was financed by the Alfredo Stroessner dictatorship and used as propaganda for the ideals proposed by the regime, making it a fundamental piece for the strengthening of historical revisionism in the country. The movied is considered a prominent film within Paraguay. The work depicts the last days of the conflict in 1869, featuring a tired troop made up basically of children and the elderly. Right at the beginning of the movie, the production proposal is declared: "The movie is a message from the Paraguayan government and people in favor of understanding nations in peace and harmony, by demonstrating that wars do not conquer the free determination of peoples, a sublime ideal which led marshal Francisco Solano López to his epic finale". This demonstrates the revisionist character of the production.

The movie features a tired Solano López (played by Roberto De Felice), representing the peak of a devastated country, and Eliza Lynch (Rosa Ros) as firm, despite all the difficulties. Women are shown with great importance in the production, representing the Paraguayan patriarchal figure. Their prominence is presented in two ways: their support in a financial sense or acting on the battlefield. In general, the work directed by Vera seeks to present a country united around an ideal, uniting the different economic classes in favor of independence, in addition to exalting López as a great military leader, who sought at all costs to maintain independence not only for his country, but for all Latin American countries.

== See also ==
- Paraguayan War casualties
