= Juan Crisóstomo Centurión =

Paraguayan politician (1840–1902)

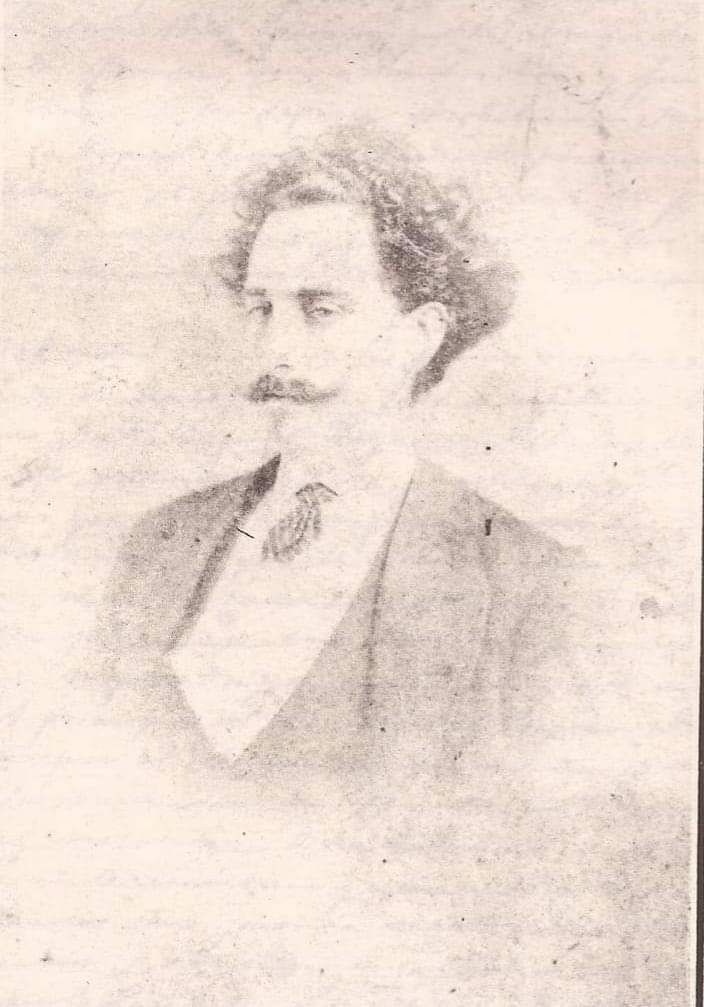

Minister of the Paraguayan Supreme Court of Justice
- In office 11 January 1882 – 12 August 1882
- In office 24 September 1883 – 5 October 1883

Minister of Foreign Affairs
- In office 28 September 1888 – November 1890
- Preceded by: José Segundo Decoud
- Succeeded by: Venancio Víctor López

Senator of Paraguay
- In office 1 April 1895 – 12 March 1902
- Constituency: Caaguazú/Valenzuela

Personal details
- Born: 27 January 1840 Itauguá, Paraguay
- Died: 12 March 1902 (aged 62) Asunción, Paraguay
- Resting place: Recoleta Cemetery, Asuncion
- Awards: Officer of the National Order of Merit; Medal for Amambay

Military service
- Branch/service: Paraguayan Army
- Years of service: 1868–1870
- Rank: Colonel
- Battles/wars: Triple Alliance War; Battle of Lomas Valentinas; Battle of Acosta Ñu; Battle of Cerro Corá (WIA)

Juan Crisóstomo Centurión y Martinez (27 January 1840 – 12 March 1902) was a Paraguayan Army officer and politician. He served with distinction in the Triple Alliance War, and afterwards held a wide variety of positions in the Paraguayan governmental structure, including that of Minister of Foreign Affairs.

== Biography ==
=== Early life and studies ===
Centurión was born to Francisco Antonio Pérez de Centurión, a lawyer, and Rosalía Martínez y Rodas in 1840 in Itauguá, a town located circa 30 kilometers away from the Paraguayan capital Asunción. After studying in a provincial school during his youth, he moved to Asunción, where he was a pupil of foreign teachers such as the Spaniard Ildefonso Bermejo and the Frenchman Pedro Dupuy; he also joined the philosophy seminar, which was headed by then president Carlos Antonio López.

In 1858 he was chosen by the government to embark to Europe to study at universities there – he graduated in law at the King's College in London, and studied French, German and English literature as well. With the rising tensions between Brazil and Paraguay, he was summoned back in 1863; the Triple Alliance War broke out in the following year.

=== The Triple Alliance War ===
Initially, back in Paraguay, he served as secretary for the Ministry of Foreign Affairs and translator, positions he held throughout the war; simultaneously, he directed a school where he taught geography and languages, and wrote for the government military organ El Cabichuí. He was present as an observer at the Battle of Riachuelo in 1865, and was made a Knight of the National Order of Merit in 1866, then Officer of the Order in January 1869.

In 1868, he was a member of the tribunals which mass convicted citizens in the San Fernando massacre. As the war wound down, in 1869, Centurión was a Colonel in the Paraguayan Army, having been instated into the army as a Sergeant Major after the Battle of Lomas Valentinas. He commanded a battalion of riflemen in the Battle of Cerro Corá and was wounded there in the mouth, losing a considerable part of his teeth and tongue to a bullet. He was then taken prisoner to Rio de Janeiro.

=== After the War ===
After his release in 1870, he resided in France, the United States, and Jamaica, before eventually returning to Paraguay in 1878. He soon started working in the country's press, contributing to newspapers such as La Reforma and La Democracia, and also as a lawyer.

He was made Minister of the Supreme Court and Attorney General for the State in the 1880s; afterwards, he was made Minister of Foreign Affairs during Patricio Escobar's government. He was a founding member of the long-standing Colorado Party, and of the Instituto Paraguayo, the country's main intellectual organization for much of the late 19th century and early 20th century.

In 1890, he was made minister plenipotentiary to the United Kingdom, France and Spain, but the position was closed due to financial constraints in early 1891. In 1895 he became a senator.

He is famed for having published, in the latter years of his life, a detailed account of his experiences during the war, titled "Memorias ó Reminiscencias históricas sobre la Guerra del Paraguay" [Historical Memories and Remembrances regarding the Triple Alliance War]. Earlier, in 1877, he had published the novel "Viaje nocturno de Gualberto o recuerdos y reflexiones de un ausente" [Gualberto's nightly trip or an absentee's memories and reflections] under a pseudonym, which is thought to be the first novel ever published by a Paraguayan writer.

He died in Asunción, in the 12th of March 1902.
