= Cerro Corá (hill) =

- Location within Paraguay

Highest point
- Elevation: 318 m (1,043 ft)
- Coordinates: 22°40′00″S 55°59′00″W

Geography
- Location: Pedro Juan Caballero, Amambay Department, Paraguay
- Parent range: Amambai Mountains

Geology
- Mountain type: Hill

Cerro Corá (Spanish pronunciation: [ˈsero koˈɾa]) is a hill in Paraguay, with an elevation of 318 meters (1,043 ft). It is located in the municipality of Pedro Juan Caballero, Amambay Department, in the Amambai Mountains.

In 1870, it was the site of the Battle of Cerro Corá, the concluding battle of the Paraguayan War.
