= Chiriguelo =

Coordinates: 23°38′50″S 55°52′53″W

Chiriguelo is a place or inhabited location in the Paraguayan district of Pedro Juan Caballero, in Amambay. It is located on Route 5, 12 miles (19 kilometres) from the center of Pedro Juan Caballero, and is 553 metres (1,814 ft) above sea level. It is also known as Colonia Capitán Raúl Ocampos Rojas.

Chiriguelo is near the border with Brazil, and has police and customs offices to control or check migration and merchandise traffic between Paraguay and Brazil; these services were previously provided by the offices in Pedro Juan Caballero.
