= Amambay Department =

Department of Paraguay

Amambay Department Departamento de Amambay (Spanish) Tetãvore Amambái (Guarani)
- Department
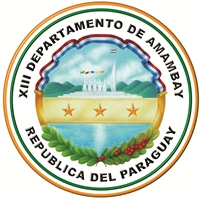
- Flag Coat of arms
- Etymology: Guarani: Amambái (eagle fern)
- Amambay shown in red
- Coordinates: 22°31′48″S 55°45′0″W
- Country: Paraguay
- Region: Eastern Region
- Established: 1945
- Capital: Pedro Juan Caballero
- Largest city: Pedro Juan Caballero

Government
  - Governor: Juan Acosta (ANR)

Area
  - Total: 12,935 km^{2} (4,994 sq mi)
  - Rank: 9

Population (2022 census)
  - Total: 179,412
  - Rank: 13
  - Density: 13.870/km^{2} (35.924/sq mi)
- Time zone: UTC-03 (PYT)
- ISO 3166 code: PY-13
- Number of Districts: 5
- Website: amambay.gov.py

Amambay (Spanish pronunciation: [amamˈbaj]) is a department in Paraguay. The capital is Pedro Juan Caballero.

The name comes from the name of a part of the Caaguazú Cordillera, "Amambai Mountains". Amambay is the name of a fern, typical of the forest in the region.

== Districts ==
The department is divided in 6 districts:

1. Bella Vista
2. Capitán Bado
3. Karapaí
4. Pedro Juan Caballero
5. Zanja Pytá
6. Cerro Corá

== History ==
For a long time, the land was occupied by the natives of the region and suffered the attacks of the Bandeirantes that were looking for the Guaranís, who were able to find refuge in the jungle of the area.

After the Paraguayan War, vast expanses of land passed to the hands of foreign businessmen dedicated to exploiting yerba mate and lumber.

Pedro Juan Caballero was founded in 1893, and Bella Vista in 1902. The department of Amambay was created in 1945 as the No. 10 department of the country. After some reorganization it was declared as the No. 13 department.

The population in the area was consolidated with the establishment of rural colonies dedicated to agriculture and livestock industries.

Pedro Juan Caballero, the capital of the department, is still known by its old name, Punta Porá, used by the traveling merchants that transported yerba from Mato Grosso to Concepción.

In 2020 Amambay, as an important drug trafficking route, while accounting for just 2.4% of the country’s population, suffered over a quarter of its murders.

== Geography ==
Amambay is located in the north part of the Oriental Region of Paraguay. The exact geographic location is between the parallels 55° 28′ and 57° 00′ of West longitude and between meridians 22° 05′ and 23° 05′ of South latitude.

=== Limits ===
The limits are: To the North: Brazil, from which is separated by the Apa River and Amambay Cordillera.

To the South: Canindeyú Department

To the East: Brazil, from which is separated by the Amambay Cordillera

To the West: Concepción and San Pedro Departments

=== Climate ===
The average temperature is 21 °C; it reaches 35 °C in summer and drops to −1 °C in winter. The rainy months are January, February and March.

=== Orography and soil ===
In the territory are predominant, from north to south sandstone and rocks.

Amambay is the highest of Paraguayan territories, it reaches 300 to 400 meters, and the Punta Porá Hill reaches even 700 meters. The Amambay Cordillera serves as the natural limit with Brazil and from it parts the Serranía Cerro Corá, Tacurupytá, Guasú, Alambique, Tuna and Tangaró.

Some isolated hills are: Tranquerita, Tacuara, Verón Cué and Cuatiá.

=== Hydrography ===
The Apa River delimits the territory to the North, just as the Estrella Stream does with Brazil. The Aquidabán River and the streams Tapiracuai, Aquidabán-mi, Cabayu and Guazú are also in Amambay.

The West of the department is bordered by the Ypané River and others such as Tutytí, Aguaray Verde, Puente de la Tabla Puendy and Ypané-mi.

=== Natural environment ===
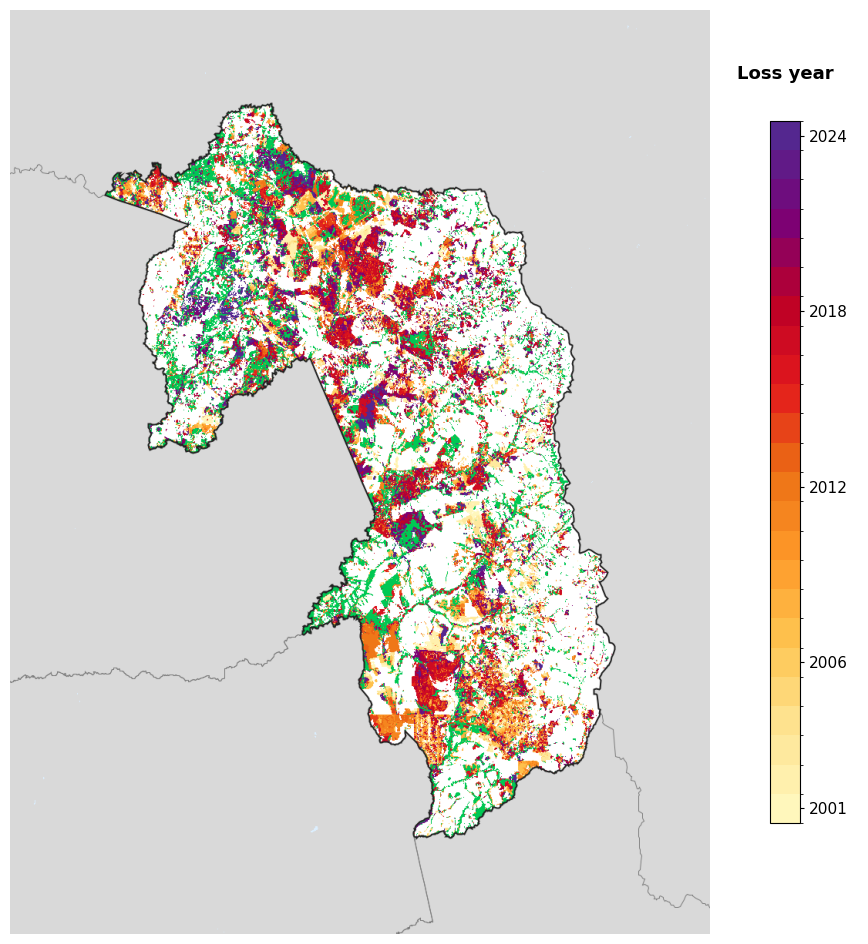
Tree-cover loss year in Amambay, 2001-2024, from the Global Forest Change dataset.

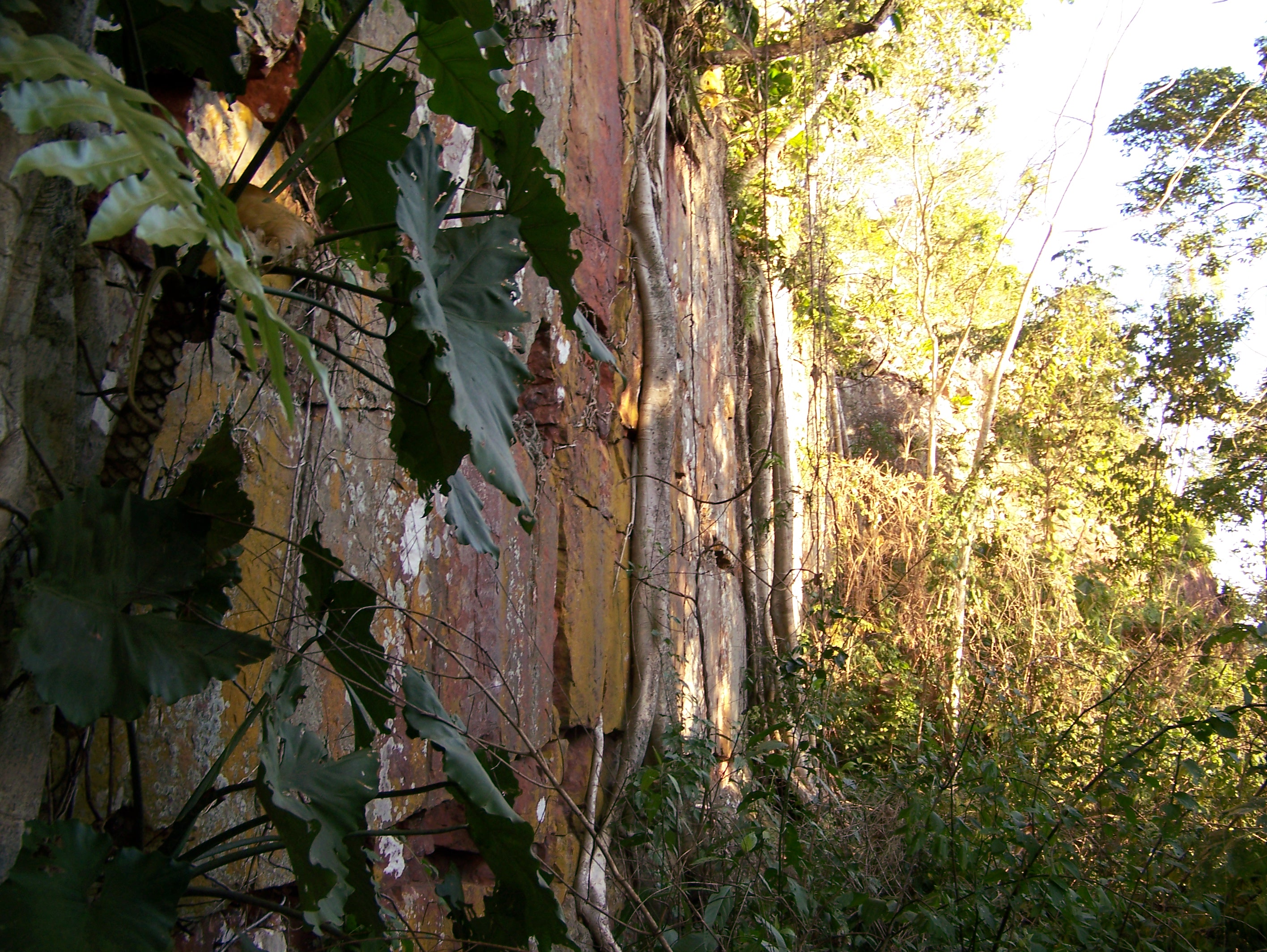
Cerro Muralla, "Wall Hill", in Amambay in the Cerro Corá National Park

The entire department belongs to the Ecological Region of Amambay. The ecosystem has a great variety of fauna and flora.

The richness natural resources in the region causes the department to be highly affected by deforestation. Some species of plants currently in danger of extinction include local palm tree species, the karanday, the arary, various species of ferns, clovers, the yvyra paje, kai kygua, and local cedars.

In addition, there are some animal species that are in danger too: gua'a sa'yju, jacaré ita, and guasuti.

The protected areas are:

- Estrella Forest: 30.000 hectares
- Pira’y Forest: 22.500 hectares
- Guasú Hill: 15.000 hectares
- Sarambí Hill: 15.000 hectares.

Cerro Corá National Park was created by decree No. 20.698 on February 11, 1976, with a surface of 12.038 hectares. It is located in Pedro Juan Caballero's district.

== Tourism ==
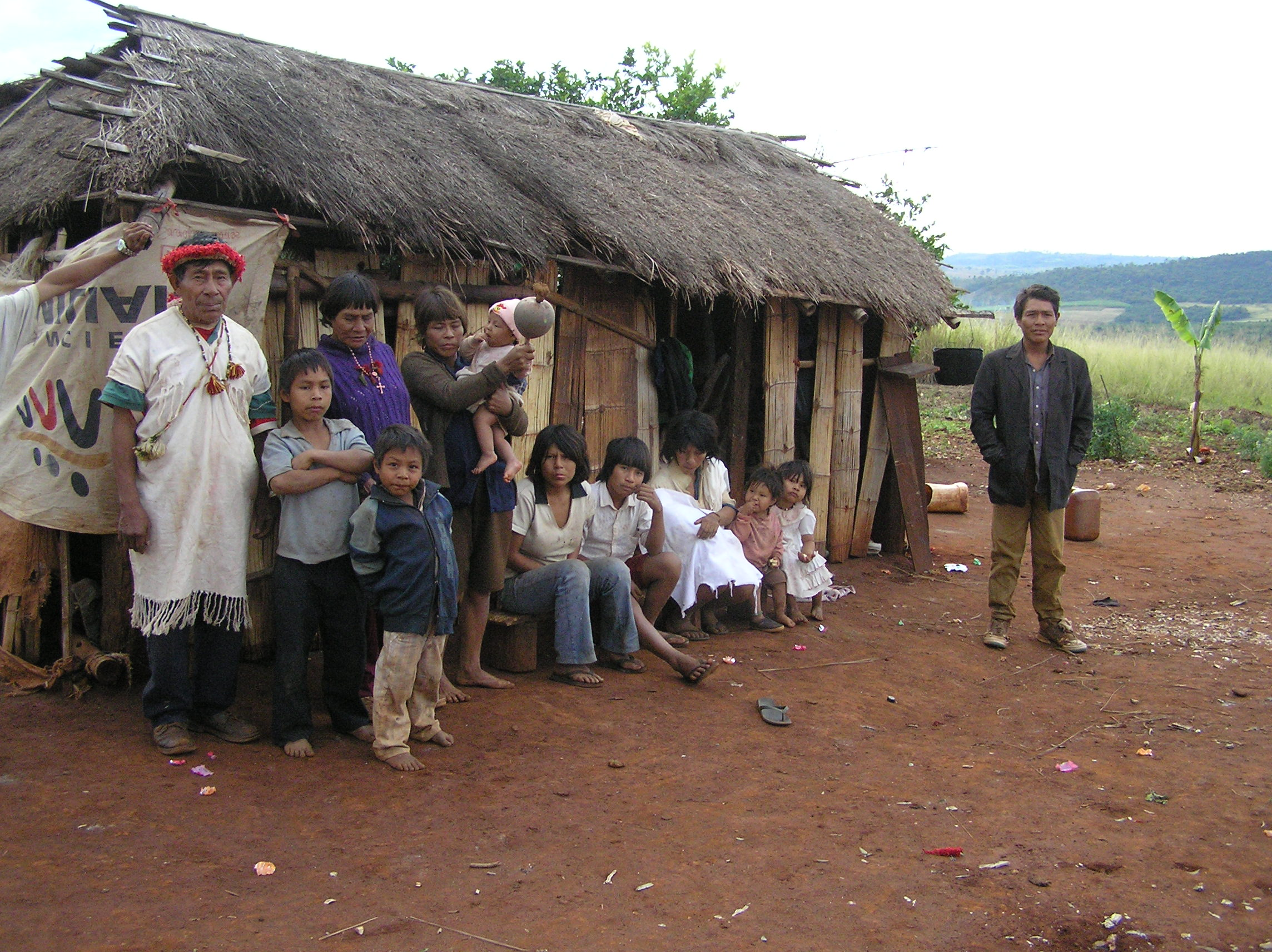
Pai Tavytera people in Amambay, 2012

Amambay is a department very favored by nature's beauty. Amambay Cordillera forms a chain of mountains: Cerro Corá, Tacurý Pytá, Guasú and Alambique. The most important hills are: Cerro Corá, located in the National Park, Acuá, Lorito, Guasú, Muralle and Sarambí.

In Cerro Corá, on the banks of Aquidabán Nigui River in 1870 an historic event took place: the death of Marshal Francisco Solano López, in the Battle of Cerro Corá. In the National Park, there is a monument to him.

In Cerro Guasú, Yasuká Verá, there are caverns and rests of human artifacts of archeological importance that date from 2.500 to 3.800 years ago.

Tapé Tuyá is a road the remaining Paraguayan army took in the campaign of 1896–1870. The area was inhabited by colonies of natives of the Tupí Guaraní Family, the Paí Tavyterá and Ava Guaraní. There is a hill in there that was considered to be a holy place by the Ava Guaraní. They thought it was the center of the Earth, where the world was created and were born the first man and the first woman.

In the area of Pedro Juan Caballero, there are recreational beaches on the riverside of the Aquidabán River as well as the commercial shopping centers of the city.

The beaches in Bella Vista are much visited by the tourists.

== Economy ==
It is a territory of intense commerce because of its limitation with Brazil.

In the country's economy, the department ranks sixth place in breeding cattle and produces 2% of the national production of cotton.

The Agricola production of the region is: garlic, cotton, rice, beans, banana, sweet potato, coffee, sugar cane, onion, sunflower, lemon, maize, tangerine, manioc, peanut, mint, sour and sweet orange, potato, pineapple, grapefruit, soy, tobacco, sorghum, tartago, tomato, yerba mate and carrot.

The people also dedicate to the breeding of several animals, such as cow, horse, sheep, goat, and some birds too, chicken, guinea, turkey, goose and duck.

The most important industries are: food, dairy, mills, yerba industries and sawmills. In Itapopó there is a very modern ceramic industry.

Every year, in October, is organized the Expo Amambay of industry, commerce and services.

== Communication and services ==
The most important ways of access to Amambay are Route No. 5 "Gral. Bernardino Caballero" that communicates with Concepción and joins Route No. 3 "Gral. Elizardo Aquino", which connects with Asunción and Cnel. Oviedo. Route No. 11 "Juana de Lara" reaches to Capitán Bado.

The department has paved and pebbled routes. The International Route that communicates Pedro Juan Caballero – Capitán Bado with Brazil is much used for business purposes.

The airport "Dr. Augusto R. Fuster" in Pedro Juan Caballero, offers regular flights to Asunción.

Amambay's radio stations are: in AM, La Voz del Amambay and Mcal. López. In FM, Pantanal, amambay, Cerro Corá, Frontera, Capitán Bado and Sin Frontera. There are also, television stations and a telephonic central.

There are 23.921 housings in the department, 16.174 in the urban area and 7.747 in the rural area. The percentage of which count with basic facilities are the following:

- Electrical power: 56,3%
- Running water: 21%
- Trash recollection: 37,7%

== Education ==
In the department there are 33 institutions of elementary education, 188 of basic education and 28 of high school education (according to the Paraguayan education system).

== Health ==
Counting hospitals and others, there is a total of 22 health care institutions.
