= Amambai Mountains =

Mountain range in Brazil and Paraguay

Coordinates: 23.53°S 55.46°W

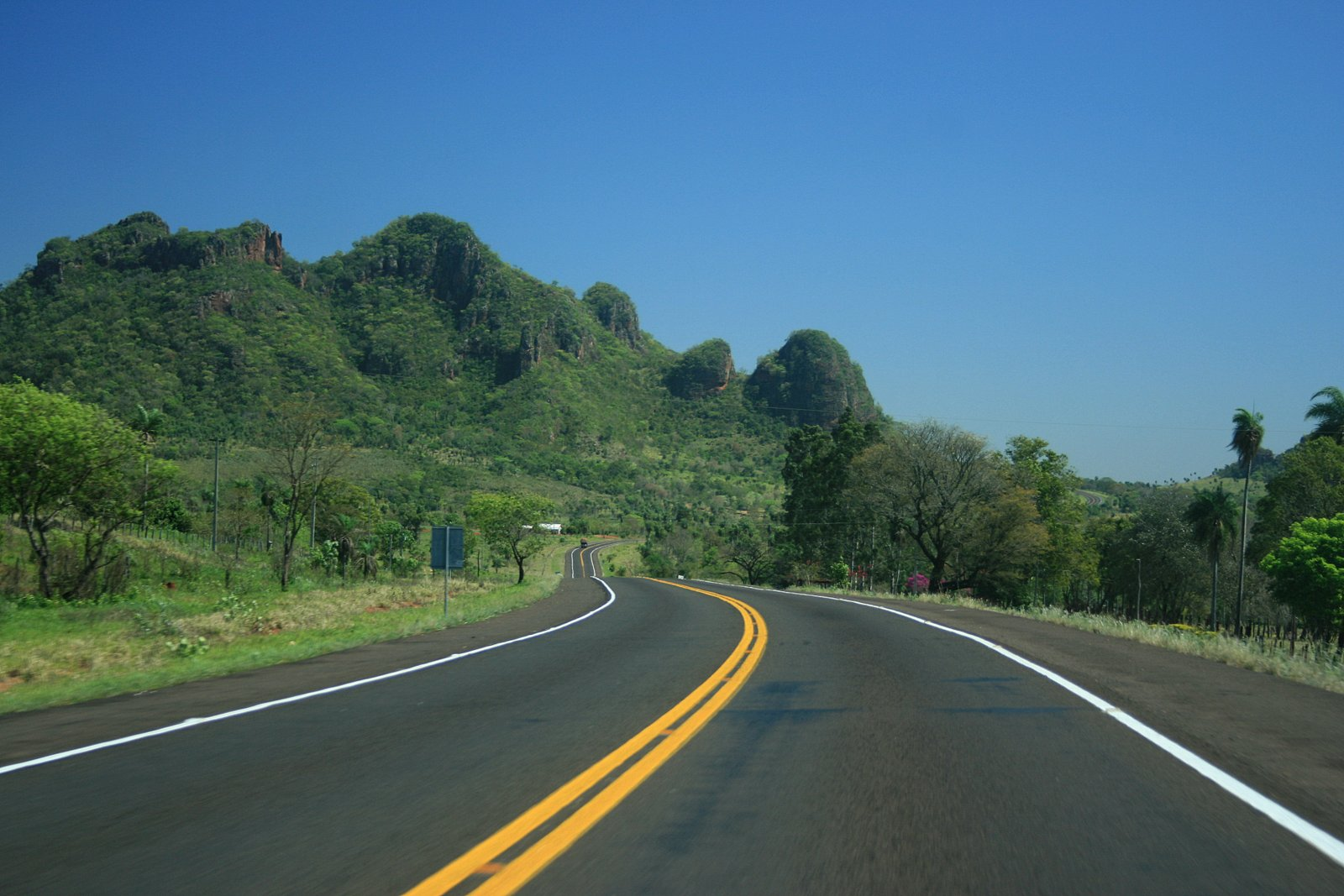
The Amambai Mountains.

The Amambaí Mountains (Serra de Amambai, Cordillera de Amambai) are a low range of mountains along part of the Brazil-Paraguay border. In southwest Brasil, it is found in the western Mato Grosso do Sul state.
