= Battle of Itapytanguá =

- Part of the Paraguayan War
Date	September 19, 1869
Location	Itapytanguá, Paraguay
Result	Brazilian victory

Belligerents
Paraguay	Empire of Brazil

Commanders and leaders
Anselmo Cañete	Joca Tavares

Strength
1,000 men 2 guns	2,000 men

Casualties and losses
257: 60 dead 195 prisoners 2 guns	31: 3 dead 28 wounded

The Battle of Itapytanguá was fought in September 1869, during the Paraguayan War's Campaign of the Hills.

After the bloody battles of Piribebuy and Acosta Ñu, the Paraguayan army had been dispersed and forced to withdraw. One of its remaining columns, under commander Anselmo Cañete, was engaged by a Brazilian force twice its size and defeated, losing its two guns and many of its men in the process.

== Background and engagement ==
After the Pikysyry campaign, which had for all means and purposes left Paraguay without a standing army, the country lacked the means to fight a regular war. A new army was hastily rebuilt in the interior of the country, with many boys and teenagers amongst its ranks, badly equipped. When operations resumed some months after Paraguayan capital Asunción was captured, this army would soon prove to be no match to those of the allies. It was dealt bloody defeats around the new Paraguayan capital of Piribebuy, in Piribebuy itself and in Acosta Ñu.

Some Paraguayan units were able to escape the latter combat, as did the Paraguayan president, Francisco Solano López. Also operational was a column of 1000 men under commander Anselmo Cañete near Concepción, in the north of the country. A month after Acosta Ñu, it was engaged by a Brazilian force twice its size; it managed to avoid confrontation briefly, on the 19th of September, by using two squadrons of cavalry to delay the enemy, which did so and withdrew. On the same day, however, the Brazilians still were able to reach the place where the column's main body was encamped, Itapytanguá, and attack it successfully. Cañete and some of his men managed to withdraw to a place called Sanguinacué. His two guns and some 1500 heads of cattle were captured, as were many Brazilian and Paraguayan families.
