= Battle of Lomaruguá =

1870 battle in Paraguayan War

- Part of the Paraguayan War
Date	January 11, 1870
Location	North of the Jejuí Guazú River, Paraguay
Result	Brazilian victory

Belligerents
Empire of Brazil	Paraguay

Commanders and leaders
Correia da Câmara	Ignacio Genes

Strength
Unknown	400 soldiers

Casualties and losses
Unknown	154 prisoners

The Battle of Lomaruguá was fought in January 1870, during the Paraguayan War's Campaign of the Hills. It was a Brazilian victory over some of Paraguayan president Francisco Solano López's last remaining forces; it was fought to the north of the Jejuí Guazú River.

It was the last battle fought before the Battle of Cerro Corá in March of the same year, which ended the war.

== Background and engagement ==
After the battles of Piribebuy and Acosta Ñu the once-formidable Paraguayan Army had been made unable to wage a regular conflict. The Paraguayan War became a chase of Paraguayan leader López by far superior allied forces.

On January 11 of 1870 a Paraguayan column was spotted by the vanguard of general Câmara's troops. It was engaged and routed, with many of its men, including its commander, later being taken prisoner. The men in the column had been surviving on fruits foraged in the forest for the past few weeks and its officers had been debating whether or not to surrender previously.

The next battle of the conflict would be that of Cerro Corá, which would bring about its end, as López was killed there.
