= Eusebio Ayala, Paraguay =

Eusebio Ayala
- City & District
- Location within Paraguay
- Coordinates: 25°22′54″S 56°57′39″W
- Country: Paraguay
- Department: Cordillera
- Founded: 1770 by Carlos Morphi

Government
  - Intendente Municipal: Nestor Fabian Delgadillo Díaz (ANR)

Area
  - Total: 338 km^{2} (131 sq mi)

Population (2022)
  - Total: 19,334
  - Density: 57.2/km^{2} (148/sq mi)
- Time zone: -4 Gmt
- Postal code: 3090
- Area code: (595) (514)

Eusebio Ayala is a city and district of the Cordillera Department, Paraguay. It is named after Eusebio Ayala, a former President of Paraguay. It is located approximately 72 km east of the city of Asunción, capital of Paraguay.

This city lies on the right bank of the stream Piribebuy, being axis road from where routes depart inside and outside the department. It was formerly called "Barrero Grande" and is still commonly known by this name, and it is well known for being located next to the fields of Acosta Ñu, the site of the Battle of Acosta Ñu, famous for the rump Paraguayan Army's desperate employment of child, elderly and wounded soldiers against a much larger veteran Brazilian and Argentine force in what proved to be the last major engagement of the Paraguayan War (1864 to 1870).

== Geography ==
The district is located towards the South Centre Department of Cordillera. It borders:

- To the north Tobatí District and Isla Pucú district
- To the south Piribebuy District and Itacurubí de la Cordillera
- To the east Isla Pucú and Santa Elena District
- To the west Tobatí District, Caacupé District and Piribebuy District

This district has a length of 338 km^{2}, with a population of approximately 19,000 inhabitants, of which nearly 40% of the people living in urban areas. Its population's density is about 60 persons per square kilometer.

=== Climate ===
Predominates a dry climate and temperate, with an average temperature of 22 °C, a minimum of 3 °C and a maximum of 40 °C. The amount of rainfall in the year reaches of 1.536 mm, giving an average of 153 mm per month. The months of June and August are the months of lowest rainfall.

== History ==
Eusebio Ayala was founded by Governor Carlos Morphi in the year 1770 under the name Barrero Grande. Previously, it was called the San Roque and Barrero Grande.

The Battle of Acosta Ñu, the final major battle in the Paraguayan War, was fought here on August 16, 1869. The Paraguayan army, composed of, by this time in the war, 6000 mostly elderly, children, adolescents, women and invalids, faced 20 000 Brazilians and Argentinians. The battle began with an infantry assault on Paraguayan positions which lasted for eight hours until the Paraguayans retreated to a fortified redoubt. The redoubt was destroyed by Brazilian artillery fire, and the defenders formed a defensive square around the eight cannon stationed there. However, the square was soon destroyed by a huge Brazilian cavalry charge, but the battered Paraguayan survivours managed to scatter them afterwards. The Brazilian commander, Gaston d'Orléans, ordered a final bayonet charge, which broke the remaining Paraguayan lines. General Caballero, the Paraguayan commander, finally ordered a withdrawal and left the field with his remaining 3000 troops. According to Brazilian historian Chiavenatto, when Eu noticed movements within the forest behind the plain of Acosta, he believed that they were Paraguayans preparing a counter-attack, and so ordered his engineers to burn the forest. The movement was in fact Paraguayan camp followers attempting to recover the injured from the field.

The number of children and teenagers fighting on the Paraguayan side killed in the battle today marks Children's Day in Paraguay.

== Economy ==
The District of Eusebio Ayala's main wealth is agriculture and the production of Chipa, which is famous for its flavor throughout the country. The inhabitants are engaged in livestock and breeding livestock beef pigs horse and sheep. In relation to agriculture, it is growing maize cotton cassava, sugarcane, snuff bean, mate, coffee, Citrus and grapes. The industry in Eusebio Ayala focuses on the production of traditional and delicious Cheese bun Barrero which may by accompanied with a cup of hot cooked mate tea. In this area there is a place called "The house of peanut" owned by a family of farmers, where various products made from peanuts such as cakes, sweets and ice cream can be bought.

== Demographics ==
The population growth rate has not undergone major changes in recent years. Its total population is about 19,000 inhabitants, which is overwhelmingly rural and with a slight predominance of men.

== Communications ==
The district of Eusebio Ayala is accessed by the international route No. 2 Mariscal José Félix Estigarribia which is the most important route, also accessed through the route No. 1 by the Department of Paraguarí.

== Notable people ==
- Ángel Amarilla, footballer
- Cirilo Antonio Rivarola, president of Paraguay
