= Battle of Caguijuru =

- Part of the Paraguayan War
Date	August 18, 1869
Location	Caguijuru and Caraguatay, Paraguay
Result	Brazilian victory

Belligerents
Paraguay	Empire of Brazil

Commanders and leaders
Pedro Hermosa; Vernal †	José Câmara; Vitorino Monteiro; Carlos Filho

Strength
1,400 men	Unknown

Casualties and losses
260 killed 530 prisoners 12 guns	13 killed 174 wounded

The Battle of Caguijuru was a brief engagement between Brazilian and Paraguayan forces on 18 August 1869, during the Paraguayan War's Campaign of the Hills.

== Battle of Caguijuru ==
After the heavy fighting at Acosta Ñu two days earlier, the chase by the allied forces for Paraguayan president Francisco Solano López continued.

On 18 August 1869, a column under general Vitorino Monteiro reached a trail named Caguijuru, near Caraguatay which had been the site of the Battle of Acosta Ñu. In the trail, a trenchline was dug and 1,200 Paraguayan soldiers were positioned in it under colonel Pedro Hermosa; earlier, these troops had killed some Brazilian soldiers in the region and strung up their bodies from trees. The Brazilian 1st Infantry Division under general Carlos Resin Filho attacked and secured the trail, inflicting 790 casualties on the Paraguayan force, capturing 12 guns and a standard. After the battle, Vitorino ordered the execution of several captured Paraguayan officers, angered over the Brazilian troops killed before the battle.

== Battle of Caraguataí ==
Following the victory in Caguijuru, another fight takes place on the same day. General José Antônio Correia da Câmara advanced to the town of Caraguataí with four corps of the 2nd Cavalry Division and encountered about 200 enemy soldiers. He immediately launched an attack and also achieved victory. The surviving Paraguayan soldiers fled to the Manduvirá or Tobatiri river.
