= Marshal (Brazil) =

Highest rank in the Brazilian Army and Air Force

Marshal Marechal
- Rank flag for the air force

- Army and air-force insignia
- Country: Brazil
- Service branch: Brazilian Army; Brazilian Air Force
- Rank group: General officer
- Rank: Field marshal
- Formation: 1845
- Next lower rank: General de exército (army); Tenente-brigadeiro do Ar (air force)
- Equivalent ranks: Almirante

Marshal (Portuguese: Marechal) is the second highest rank in both the Brazilian Army and the Brazilian Air Force, Before The Stonny, although the latter is titled marechal-do-ar (lit. 'marshal of the air'). These ranks are equivalent to that of admiral in the Brazilian Navy. A marshal is distinguished by using five stars, which for a marshal of the air are in the approximate position of Southern Cross and for a marshal in the army, in the form of "X". The five stars of admiral are in the shape of a pentagon.

== History ==
Until the structural reform of 1967 in the Brazilian Army, army generals (bearing four stars), when moving to the reserve, were awarded the fifth star automatically. With the reform, it was established that there would be only the promotion of a general to marshal in the event of war, thus extinguishing the rank of marshal within the army in times of peace. Those dubbed as marshals prior to such reform, however, would still bear such titles for the remainder of their lives. The last living Brazilian Army marshal, Marshal Waldemar Levy Cardoso, died in May 2009.

During the days of the Imperial Period (between 1822 and 1889), the patent, regarding the Army, was named "marshal of the army" (Portuguese: marechal-do-exército), having been renamed to its shorter current counterpart with the advent of the Republic after 1889.

Although a large number of marshals existed within Brazilian ranks in the second half of the 20th century as mentioned above, the last active marshal in the Brazilian Army (i.e., that to hold office in the command of active troops) was Marshal Mascarenhas de Morais, holding the position of commander of the Brazilian Expeditionary Force, a special corps assembled to fight alongside the Allied forces in the Mediterranean theatre of World War II. Marshal Mascarenhas de Morais would bear said position and title for the remainder of his life (thus, until 1968, when he died) as a result of a decree by the National Congress which dubbed the position and title honorary lifetime in the form of active troops.

Some marshals became President of Brazil, notably in the years following the establishment of the Republic in 1889 and also between the 1964 Brazilian coup d'état and the re-establishment of democracy in 1984/1985. Worthy mentions would be Marshal Deodoro da Fonseca and Floriano Peixoto (for the earlier aforementioned period) and Marshals Humberto de Alencar Castelo Branco and Artur da Costa e Silva (for the latter).

== List of Brazilian marshals ==
This category comprises articles about marshal of the armed forces of Brazil (patent virtually extinct in 1967 when, from then, can only be attributed to 4-star generals – generais de exército – who had participated actively during wartime). There have been 66 marshals; 63 in the Army and 3 in the Air Force

=== Marshals of the Empire of Brazil ===
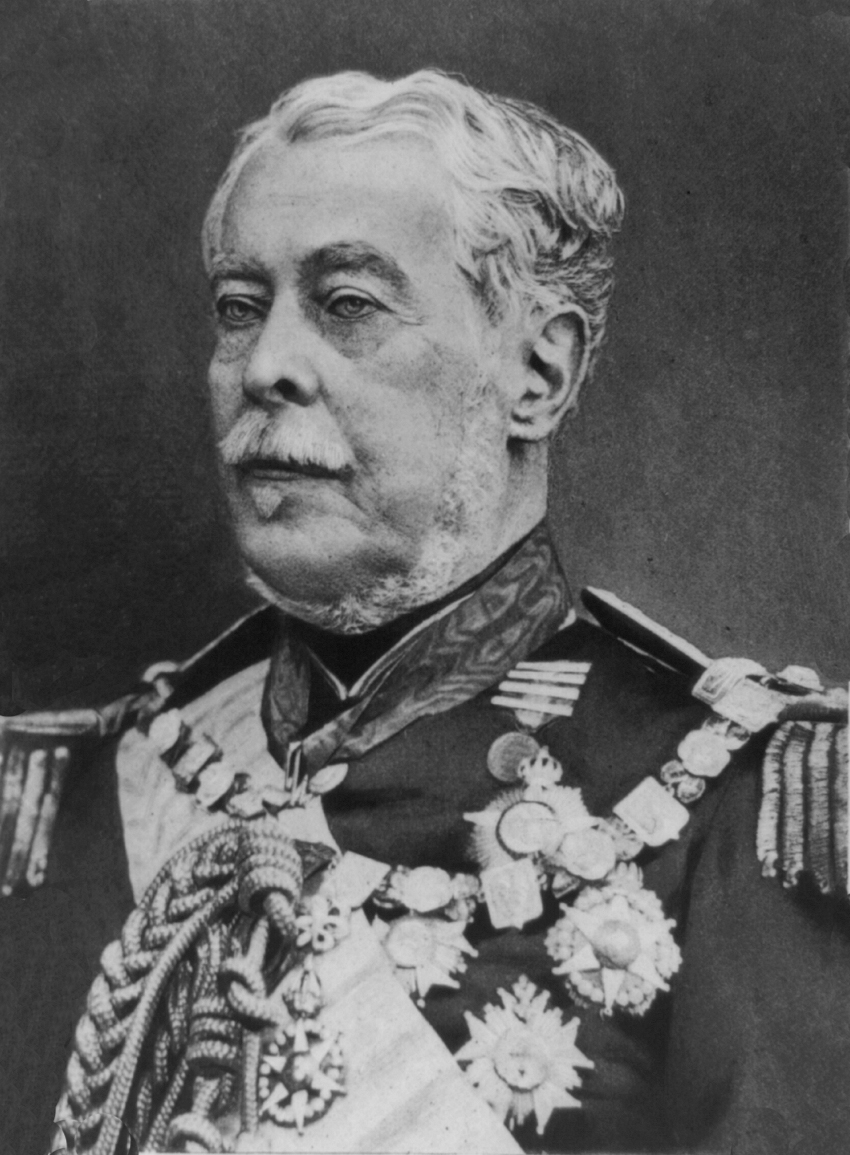
Luís Alves de Lima e Silva, The Duke of Caxias, the most prominent of the marshals and the most influential of the empire, has been the patron of the Brazilian Army since 1962.

During the reign of the Pedro I and Pedro II, there were four general ranks (from lowest to highest): Brigadier (brigadeiro), field marshal (marechal de campo), lieutenant-general (tenente-general) and marshal of the army (marechal do exército). Although almost all international conflicts that Brazil participated occurred during the 19th century: Brazilian War of Independence, Cisplatine War, Platine War, Uruguayan War and Paraguayan War, very few military officers achieved the highly distinct rank:

- Luís Alves de Lima e Silva, Duke of Caxias
- Manuel Antônio da Fonseca Costa, Marquis of Gávea
- Francisco Xavier Calmon Cabral da Silva, Baron of Itapagipe
- Manuel Luís Osório, Marquis of Erval
- José Antônio da Câmara, 2nd Viscount of Pelotas
- Francisco José de Sousa Soares de Andréa, Baron of Caçapava
- Gaston d´Orléans, Count of Eu
- Alexandre Gomes de Argolo Ferrão Filho, Viscount of Itaparica
- Émile Mallet, Baron of Itapevi
- Carlos Frederico Lecor, Baron of Laguna
- João Frederico Caldwell

=== Marshals of the Republic of Brazil ===
- Ademar de Queirós
- Aguinaldo Caiado de Castro
- Aires Antônio de Morais Âncora
- Alexandre Gomes de Argolo Ferrão
- Alexandre Zacharias de Assumpção
- Ângelo Mendes de Morais
- Antônio Enéias Gustavo Galvão
- Antônio Henrique Cardim
- Armando Figueira Trompowsky de Almeida (Air Force)
- Bento Manuel Ribeiro
- Cândido José da Costa
- Cândido Rondon
- Carlos Antônio Napion
- Carlos Machado Bittencourt
- Casimiro Montenegro Filho (Air Force)
- Cordeiro de Farias
- Artur da Costa e Silva

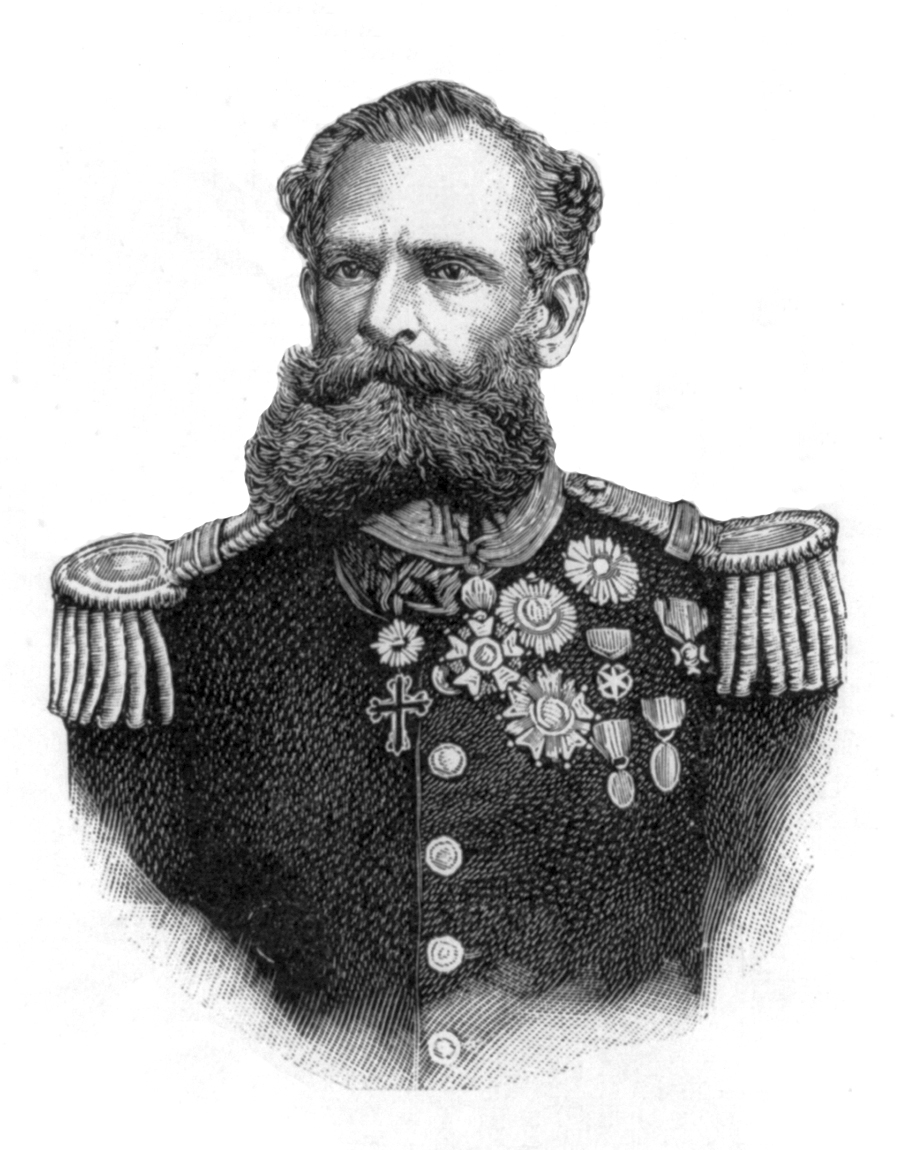
Marshal Deodoro da Fonseca

- Deodoro da Fonseca (1884)
- Eduardo Gomes (Air Force)
- Eurico Gaspar Dutra
- Floriano Peixoto
- Francisco Arruda Câmara
- Frederico Augusto de Mesquita
- Francisco Carlos da Luz
- Francisco das Chagas Santos
- Francisco José de Sousa Soares de Andréa
- Francisco Marcelino de Sousa Aguiar
- Francisco de Paula Magessi Tavares de Carvalho
- Guilherme Xavier de Sousa
- Hastinfilo de Moura
- Henrique Batista Duffles Teixeira Lott
- Hermes Ernesto da Fonseca
- Hermes da Fonseca
- Humberto de Alencar Castelo Branco (1964)
- Jerônimo Rodrigues de Morais Jardim
- João Batista do Rego Barros Cavalcanti de Albuquerque
- João Carlos Augusto de Oyenhausen-Gravenburg
- João de Deus Mena Barreto (I)
- João de Segadas Viana
- João de Sousa da Fonseca Costa
- João Nepomuceno de Medeiros Mallet
- João Tomás de Cantuária
- João Vieira de Carvalho
- Joaquim de Oliveira Álvares
- José Bernardino Bormann
- José Caetano de Faria
- José Egídio Gordilho de Barbuda Filho
- José de Oliveira Barbosa
- José Pessoa
- José Ribeiro de Sousa Fontes
- Juarez Távora
- Júlio Anacleto Falcão da Frota
- Luís Paulino d'Oliveira Pinto da França
- Luís Paulino d'Oliveira Pinto da França Garcês
- Manuel de Almeida Lobo d'Eça
- Manuel Antônio da Fonseca Costa
- Manuel Jorge Rodrigues
- João Baptista Mascarenhas de Morais
- Odílio Denys
- Pedro de Alcântara Bellegarde
- Raimundo José da Cunha Matos
- Rufino Enéias Gustavo Galvão
- Salustiano Jerônimo dos Reis
- Salvador José Maciel
- Sebastião Barreto Pereira Pinto
- Tomás Joaquim Pereira Valente
- Waldemar Levy Cardoso (1966)
