= Batalha do Avaí =

Painting by Pedro Américo

- Batalha de Avahy (Portuguese)
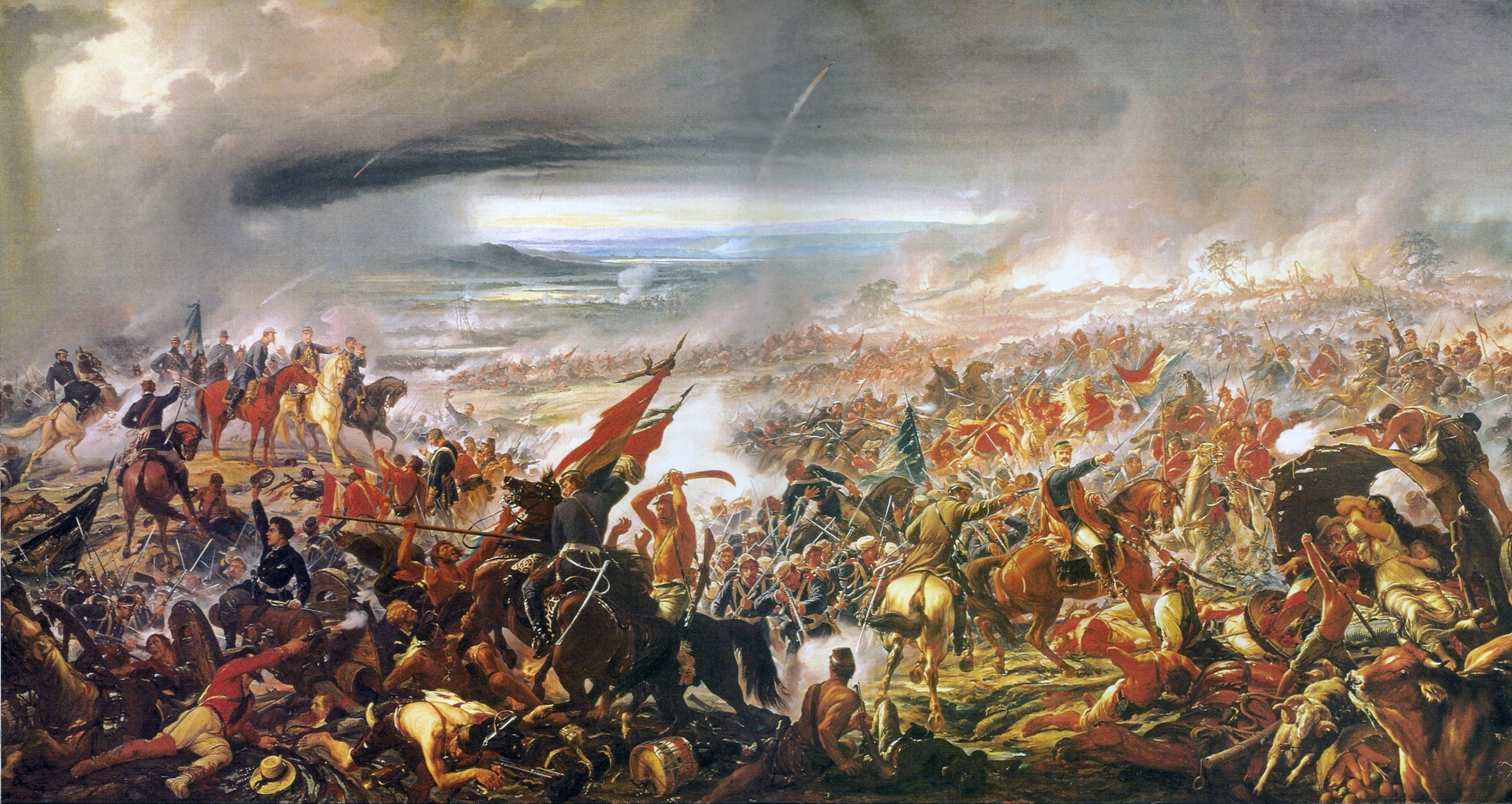
- Artist: Pedro Américo
- Year: 1872–1877
- Medium: Oil on canvas
- Dimensions: 600 by 1,100 centimetres (240 in × 430 in)
- Location: Museu Nacional de Belas Artes, Rio de Janeiro

Batalha do Avaí or Batalha de Avahy is a monumental oil painting by Brazilian painter Pedro Américo, produced between 1872 and 1877.

Commissioned by the imperial government of the Empire of Brazil, the work depicts the Battle of Avaí, a major engagement of the War of the Triple Alliance (1864–1870) between Paraguay and the coalition formed by Brazil, Argentina, and Uruguay. Pedro Américo painted the canvas in Florence, Italy, when he was about 29 years old.

Measuring approximately 6 metres (20 ft) high by 11 metres (36 ft) wide, the canvas offers a dramatic and detailed representation of the battle. It portrays the chaos and brutality of fighting, showing soldiers in action and scenes of human suffering. Rather than depicting the battle with strict historical fidelity, Américo sought to capture the emotional intensity of war in general, rather than faithfully depicting the battle itself.

The painting was first exhibited in Florence in 1877 and later transferred to Rio de Janeiro. It was displayed alongside Batalha dos Guararapes by Victor Meirelles at the 25th General Exhibition of Fine Arts of the Imperial Academy of Fine Arts in 1879 before roughly 300,000 visitors.

The exhibition highlighted the qualities of both works, shown side by side, but also fostered rivalry between the artists, fueled by press commentary. The painting provoked mixed reactions: some praised its evocative power, while others criticized its dramatic style and idealized portrayal of events.

Despite the controversies, Batalha do Avaí, now housed at the Museu Nacional de Belas Artes, is regarded as one of the major works of 19th-century Brazilian painting and an essential milestone and an exceptional work in Brazilian artistic production.

== Context ==
=== Historical background ===
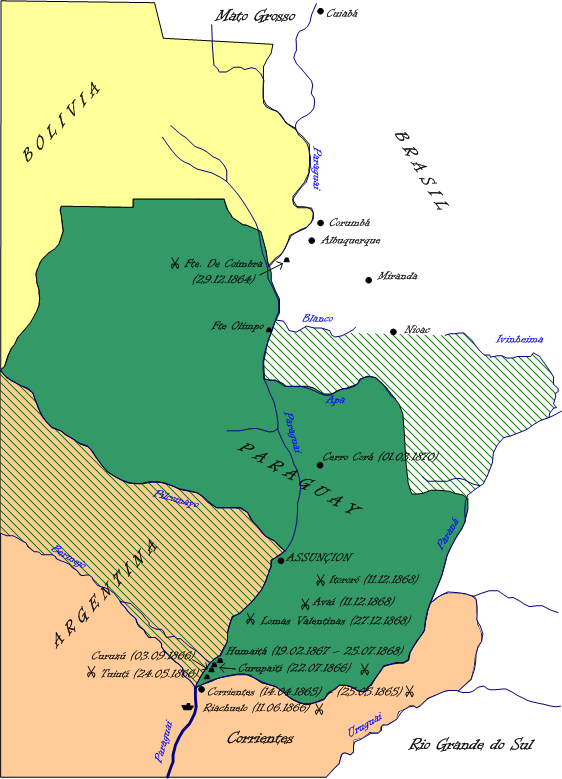
Theater of operations of the War of the Triple Alliance.

The painting represents the Battle of Avaí, fought on the stream of the same name (in Paraguayan territory) on 11 December 1868 during the War of the Triple Alliance between Paraguay and the allied forces of Argentina, Brazil, and Uruguay. The battle took place during the phase known as the Dezembrada, which also included the battles of Itororó, Lomas Valentinas, and Angostura. During this phase, Brazilian troops destroyed the Paraguayan army along the banks of the Avaí River. Moreover, the painting itself captures a moment of great significance at the end of the battle, symbolizing both the height of the Brazilian Empire and the beginning of its decline

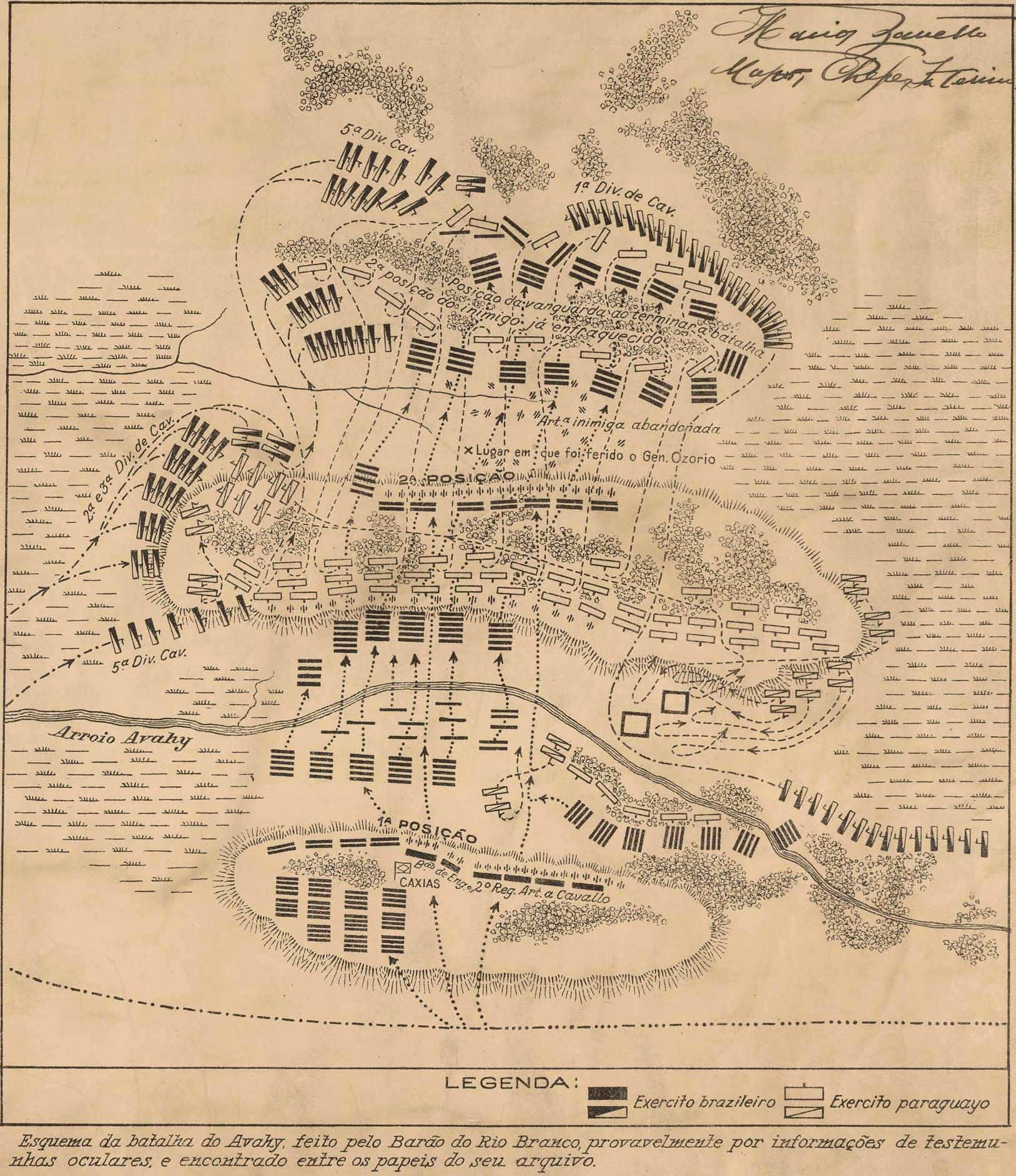
Map of the Battle of Avay.

The War of the Triple Alliance (1864–1870) was the largest military conflict in Brazil's history. None of the protagonists expected the confrontation to last so long, and the internal structures of the four countries were shaken by the war. It began in December 1864 with Paraguay's invasion of Brazilian territory over trade and border disputes and ended about five years later, in March 1870, with the death of Paraguayan head of state Francisco Solano López.

Before the war, Paraguay pursued independent economic development, closing its market to foreign interests and maintaining no external debt. In contrast, the Triple Alliance countries entered the conflict with foreign debt. By 1871, however, all four nations were indebted, and Paraguay was forced to open its market to survive.

The war left Paraguay nearly destroyed and opened its markets, benefiting primarily British economic interests. Brazil and Argentina annexed significant Paraguayan territory, while Uruguay gained nothing. The Brazilian Empire also declined, weakened by heavy foreign debt and wartime casualties.

In the end, Paraguay lost much of its industry, territory (about 140,000 square kilometres (54,000 sq mi)), and population (around 200,000 people). Brazil incorporated part of this territory and consolidated influence in the Río de la Plata region, aided by river routes linking to Mato Grosso. Brazil also suffered heavy losses. Official figures list 23,917 deaths, though some estimates reach 100,000. The country emerged with a large external debt to the United Kingdom, contributing to rising inflation.

At the Battle of Avaí, Paraguayan forces fought fiercely but were encircled by a flanking maneuver and destroyed. The engagement is considered a decisive step toward Brazil's ultimate victory.

=== Pedro Américo ===
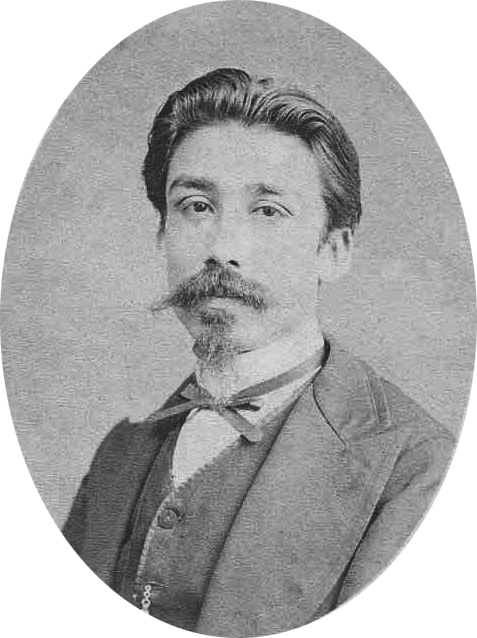
Pedro Américo photographed by M. Nogueira da Silva (Rio de Janeiro, 1871).

Pedro Américo Figueiredo e Melo (1843–1905) was a Brazilian poet, novelist, philosopher, art professor, and painter.

A decisive moment in his artistic life occurred in 1852 when he met the French naturalist Louis Jacques Brunet in Areia, his hometown, during a geological expedition in Paraíba. Brunet took the young Américo as a draftsman on his expedition for two years, traveling through Paraíba, Pernambuco, Ceará, Rio Grande do Norte, and Piauí. Wishing to support the development of his talent and education, Brunet sent two of Américo's drawings to the provincial president, accompanied by a letter requesting that the government take charge of his education. The provincial president took an interest in the matter and sent the boy to the capital. In 1853, at age 11, Américo left Paraíba for Rio de Janeiro and enrolled at Colégio Pedro II. During a visit by Emperor Pedro II of Brazil to his school, Américo drew him sitting on the stairs reading a book. This drawing was brought to the Emperor himself, who enrolled the young man at the Imperial Academy of Fine Arts in 1856, which Américo completed in two years.

At age 13, Pedro Américo petitioned Emperor Pedro II for a scholarship to continue his studies in Europe,,: "Now that I have the knowledge in painting that I was able to receive from the Academy, to pursue my career, a trip to Europe is indispensable, and as the Academy cannot provide me with the means necessary for this journey, because it has filled its quota of pensioners, I come to confide in the extreme kindness of Your Imperial Majesty to ask for the grace of sending me to complete my studies in Europe". After obtaining imperial support, he traveled to Paris to study at the École des Beaux-Arts, where he trained under Jean-Auguste-Dominique Ingres, Léon Cogniet, Hippolyte Flandrin, and Carle Vernet.

During his studies in France, he produced several works and received and award for a study of the human figure. At the end of his training in 1864, he painted A Carioca, for which he received the gold medal at the 1866 General Exhibitions. He then returned to Brazil to take up the chair of figurative drawing at the Imperial Academy of Fine Arts, a position he held from 1865 to 1890, the period during which he received major state commissions.

=== Commission ===
Diplomatic success against the United Kingdom and military victories over Uruguay in 1865, followed by the victorious end of the war with Paraguay in 1870, marked the beginning of a “golden age” of the Brazilian Empire. At the time this painting was produced, one of the Empire's main concerns was to build a sense of national unity. Another intention behind the works commissioned during this period was to motivate the Brazilian population to forget the ravages of war because, even though it was victorious, it had lost many soldiers and was still counting its losses.

The state sought to promote its achievements and build a national identity. It therefore commissioned Pedro Américo to paint a canvas depicting the Battle of Guararapes, a conflict that took place in Pernambuco between 1648 and 1649 between the Dutch West India Company and the colonial Portuguese Empire at Morro dos Guararapes,.

Pedro Américo chose to depict the more recent Battle of Avaí, while Victor Meirelles painted the earlier conflict in Batalha dos Guararapes, a landmark of Brazilian art.

When accepting the commission for Batalha do Avaí, Américo decided that the price of the work would only be fixed upon completion, so that it could be assessed by specialists. Once the painting was finished, professors at the Academy of Fine Arts of Florence valued it at 115,000 contos de réis, but Américo received only 53,000 contos de réis from the Empire".

During the exhibition of the work in Florence, the painter asked Emperor Pedro II to give him part of the money from the painting so that he could organize an exhibition in Paris, but the Emperor replied that when he was travelling, he was not a monarch and could do nothing. Pedro Américo received the money two years late, the payment having been made in five installments.

It is also noteworthy that Batalha do Avaí was only completed and exhibited seven years after the end of the War of the Triple Alliance, so that when it was first shown, the political context had already changed — "it was one of the questionings of the advantages and disadvantages of the conflict for Brazil".

== Description and analysis ==
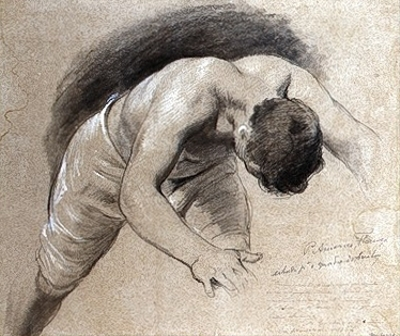
Study for Batalha do Avaí, white chalk and black stone on paper (1857, Pinacoteca do Estado de São Paulo).

=== Technical description ===
The canvas is monumental in scale, measuring 600 by 1,100 centimetres (240 by 430 in). To meet the expectations of the State, Pedro Américo spared no expense on paint and projection when executing Batalha do Avaí. Designed to impress and evoke realism, the painting was praised in 1879 as “not a simple painting; it is war itself, charged with all its horrors”.

Unlike many painters who depicted battles of the War of the Triple Alliance, including Victor Meirelles, Américo did not visit the battlefield. The work was conceived and executed entirely in Florence with assistance from the Duke of Caxias, who supplied letters, documents, and uniforms. Despite the painting's realism, some elements are implausible—for example, the Brazilian troops appear dry and orderly, even though heavy rain was falling during the battle.

All the techniques Pedro Américo learned at the Imperial Academy of Fine Arts are evident in the work, particularly in the design of the figures. The depiction of the horses demonstrates his mastery of perspective and draftsmanship, while the rendering of the soldiers reflects his studies of human anatomy.

=== General composition of the work ===
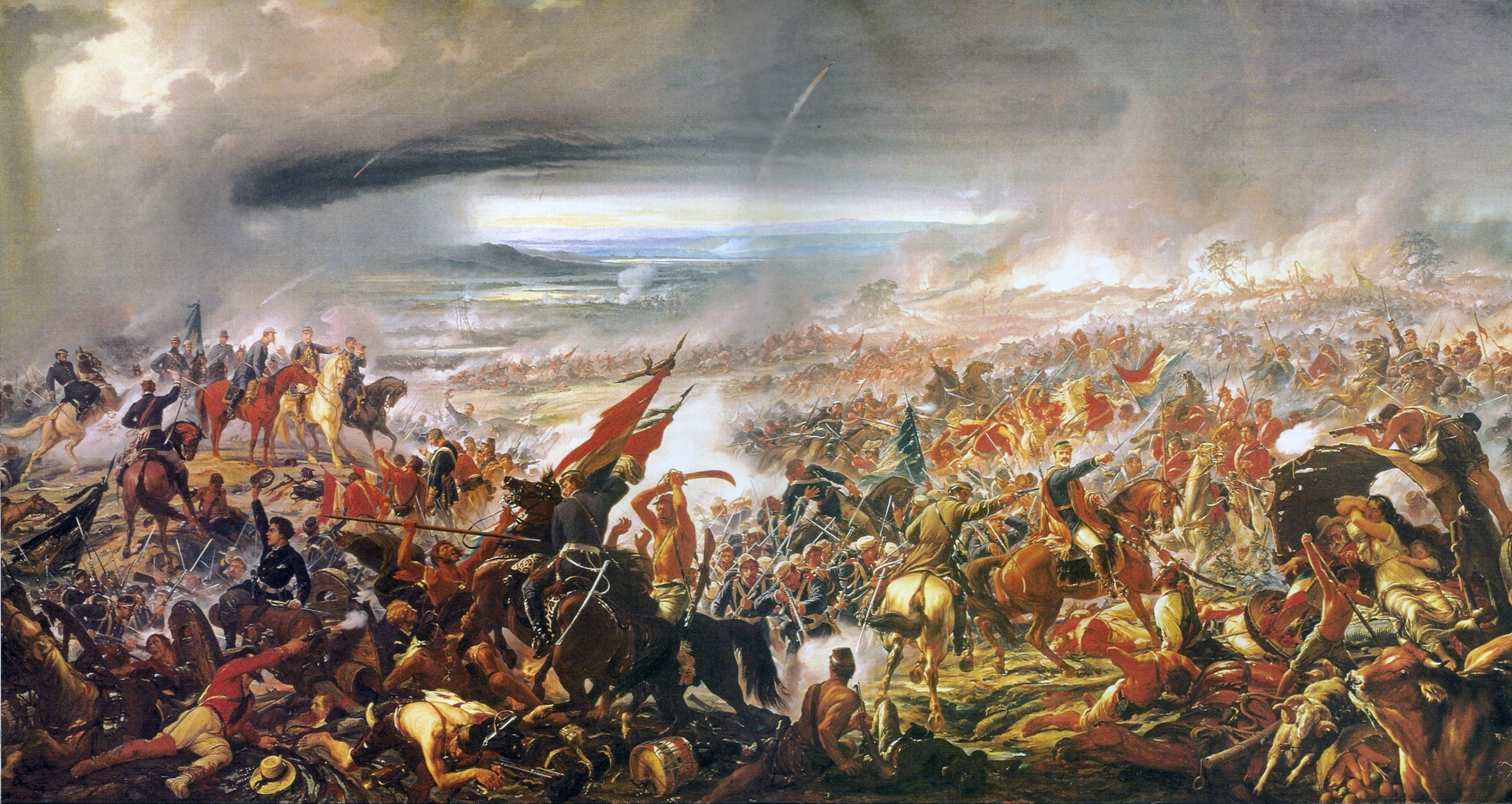
Batalha do Avaí.

Batalha do Avaí is structured like a vast vortex: all the figures in the lower half of the canvas seem to revolve in an oval movement that rises toward the smoke-filled sky in the upper half. The luminous center opens toward the horizon and the Brazilian plains.

The groups of figures are not arranged along a continuous plane, nor do they form a fully coherent perspective, apart from the fact that they diminish in size toward the background. The artist appears to have constructed a kind of collage, bringing together different moments of the battle without strict narrative continuity. The viewer cannot clearly determine where each group comes from or how it connects to the others.Yet Pedro Américo shapes the terrain and the clusters of figures in such a way that he creates a dynamic movement, spiraling inward upon itself.

Pedro Américo included a self-portrait at the center of the vortex as an infantryman. He depicts himself with wide eyes and a frenzied grimace, representing the madness and violence unleashed by war.

=== Representation of the subject ===
In its context

The War of the Triple Alliance marked both the height and the beginning of the decline of the Brazilian Empire, which explains why many painters of the era disappeared after this period. Nevertheless, Pedro Américo continued to be a republican painter, Pedro Américo remained a republican painter, which means that Batalha do Avaí can also be considered republican, albeit ambivalent, since the painting was only painted and exhibited seven years after the end of the war, at a time when the conflict was already being questioned in terms of its advantages and disadvantages for Brazil.

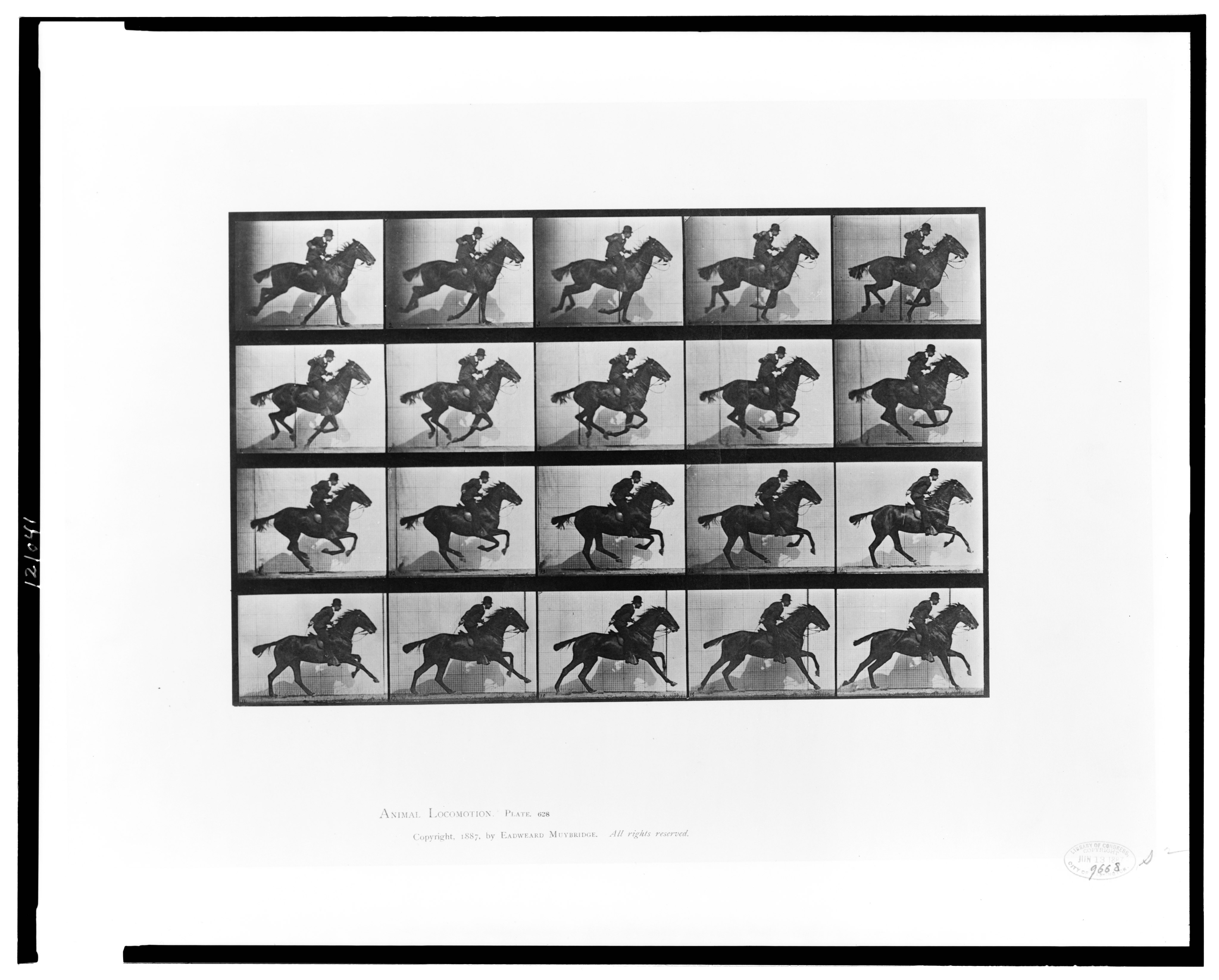
Animal Locomotion, collotype by Eadweard Muybridge (1887, Library of Congress).

The work was produced at a time when history painting contributed to the construction of a national identity; it therefore had to be realistic and striking, and aimed to tell a real story. Its dynamic brushwork and exaggerated movements, with realistic details, were probably influenced by the photographs of Eadweard Muybridge, an English pioneer in the study of movement and projections. While working in Florence, Pedro Américo had access to written materials and photographs by Muybridge, which helped and inspired him in the composition of the hyperrealistic movements of the work,.

The commissioned character of the painting appears in several scenes: the Brazilian army is portrayed as a bearer of Western civilization, while the Paraguayan forces symbolize barbarism. Brazilian soldiers wear full uniforms, whereas many Paraguayans are shown barefoot and bare-chested.

In Paraguayan works such as Batalla de Tuyutí by Pablo Alborno and in Argentine depictions by Cándido López, Modesto González, and José Ignacio Garmendia, soldiers are not portrayed half-naked.

==== Depiction of events ====
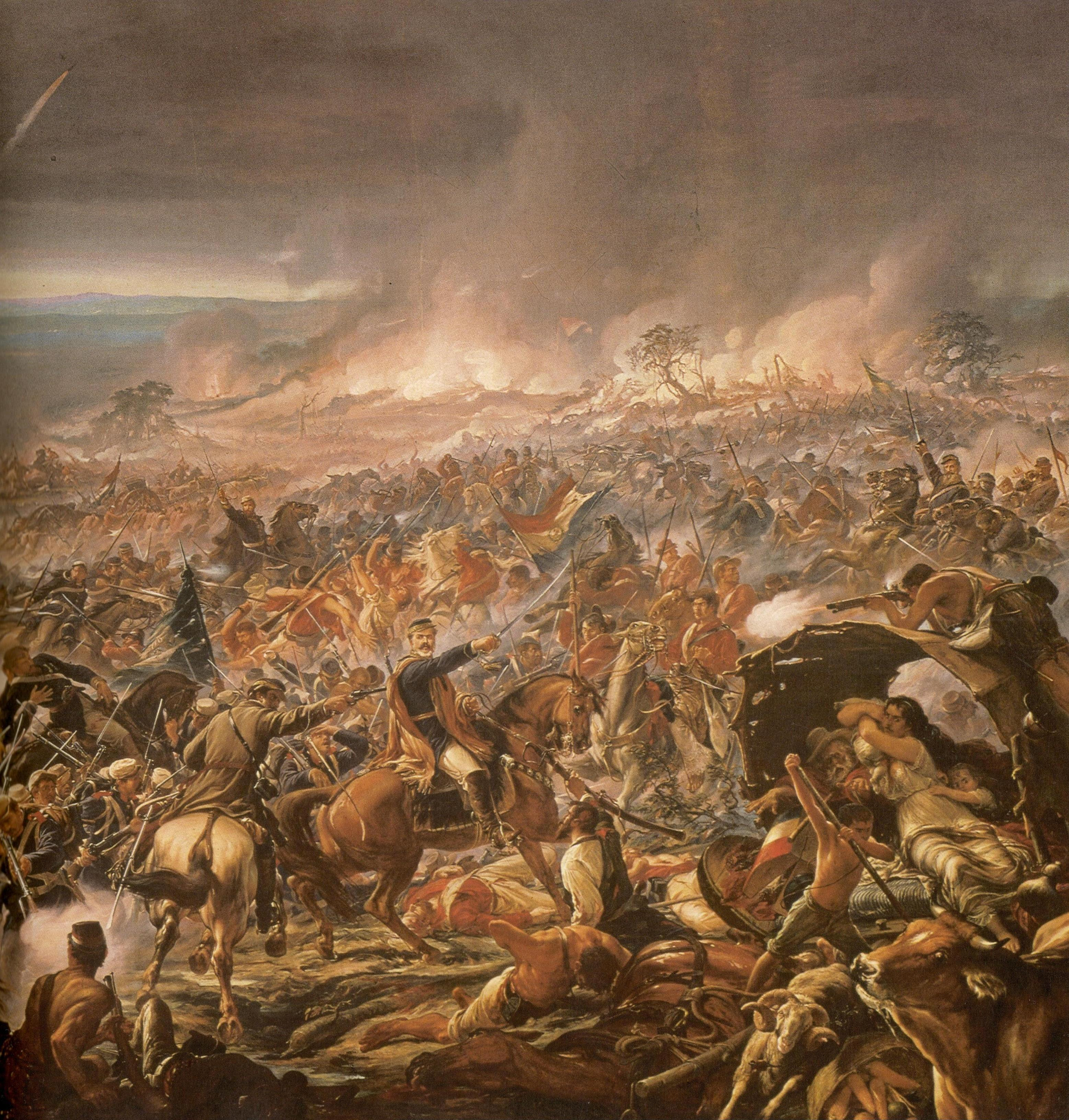
Right half of the work (detail): the scene is chaotic.

Pedro Américo was less concerned with representing the precise events of the battle than with conveying a broader vision of war. Individual episodes give way to what has been described as a “human whirlwind”: the composition has no central heroic figure, but instead presents a scene of controlled chaos. According to Jorge Coli, rather than depicting a specific act of heroism or a victorious commander, Américo portrays a world in turmoil—a universal human catastrophe.

Violence is conveyed through the swirling smoke from the weapons, which rises from the ground and forms a circular motion in the sky. As explained by Jorge Coli, Avahy seeks to do more than illustrate a battle: the canvas embodies war itself, showing men driven mad by combat and nature caught up in a vast vortex whose narrow opening reveals the horizon. In this furious movement, individual heroism disappears, and everything is swept along by the same current. The torn Brazilian flag testifies to the strain of battle. The horses provide the only sense of order, aligned by color, while all other elements express disorder and chaos, including the sky, which appears to swirl. The scene is dark, emphasizing the horrors of war: figures in the foreground are nearly life-sized and rendered in gray tones, while those in the background shrink into small, cream-colored brushstrokes.

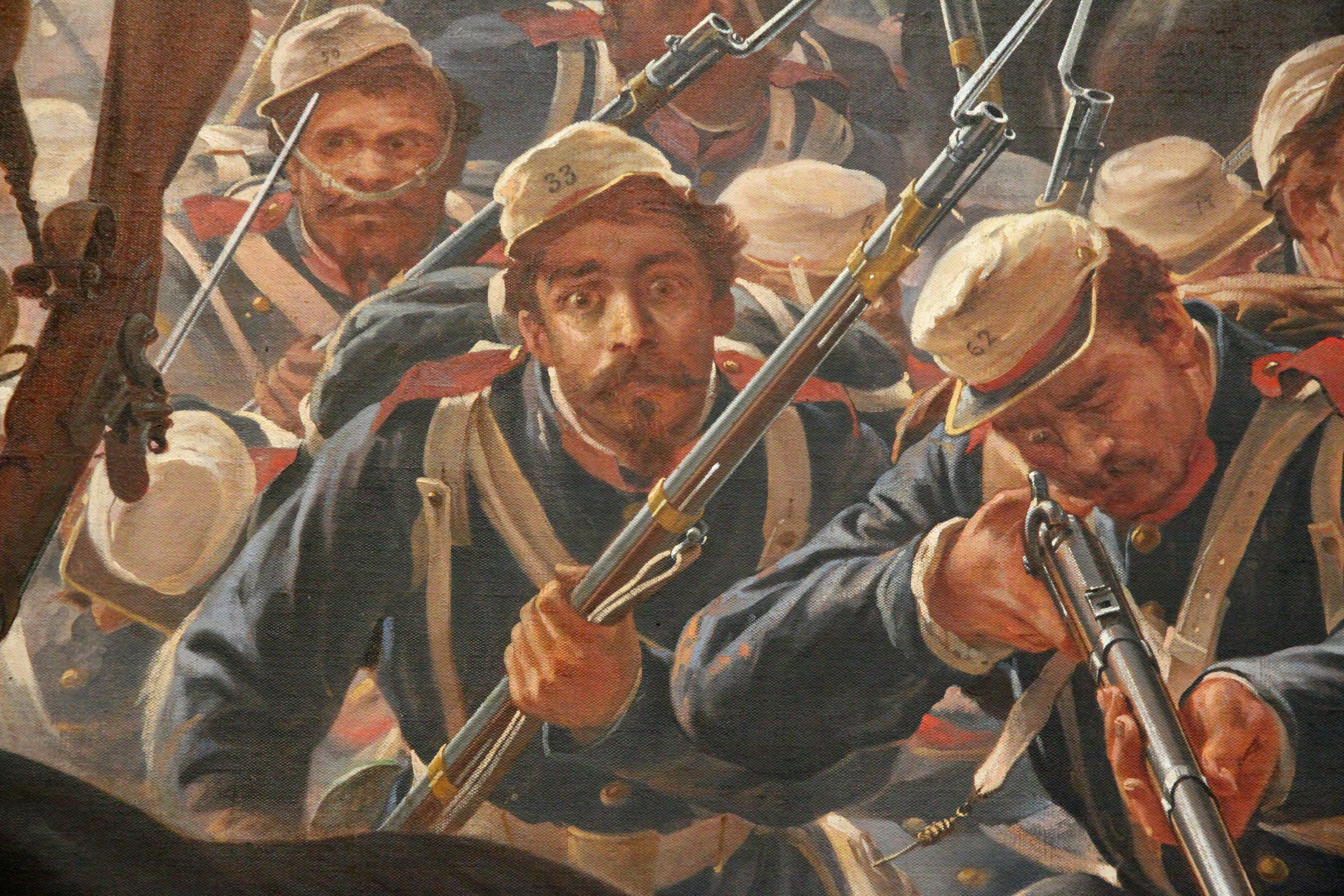
Self-portrait of Pedro Américo in Batalha do Avaí (detail).

Although officially commissioned, Pedro Américo incorporated elements that suggest a critical perspective. The prominent depiction of Black soldiers is particularly significant, as the Empire generally sought to minimize associations with slavery. In the painting, Black and white soldiers appear on equal footing, and Américo portrays himself fighting among them. He is the only figure whose bayonet is bloodstained, and the number 33 on his cap refers both to his age at the time and to the age of Christ at his death. Positioned at the center of the composition as an ordinary soldier, he contributes to the absence of a traditional heroic figure, reinforcing the painting's demystified vision of war.

The compositional climax lies in the Brazilian position, where the brightest light emphasizes the scene of battle. In the foreground, Luís Alves de Lima e Silva appears on a white horse, pointing toward the center of the conflict. His unbuttoned uniform drew much negative criticism toward the painter. The Duke himself, upon seeing the work, became angry and asked: "I wonder where the painter saw me with my uniform unbuttoned; not even in my bedroom!"Américo justified this by explaining that his aim was to show that in the midst of war, decorum does not exist.

=== Influences ===
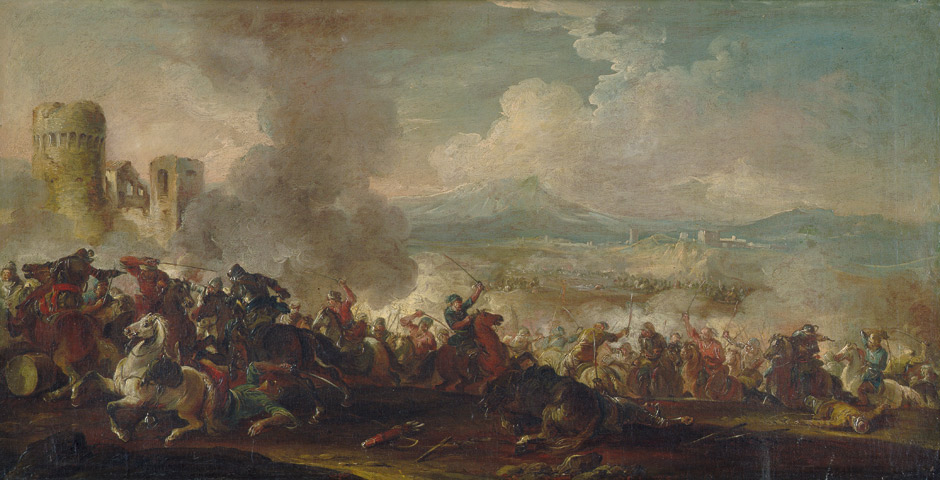
Battle scene painted by Jacques Courtois (painter)in the second half of the 17th centuryth century: the groups of figures are scattered without any protagonist being emphasized.

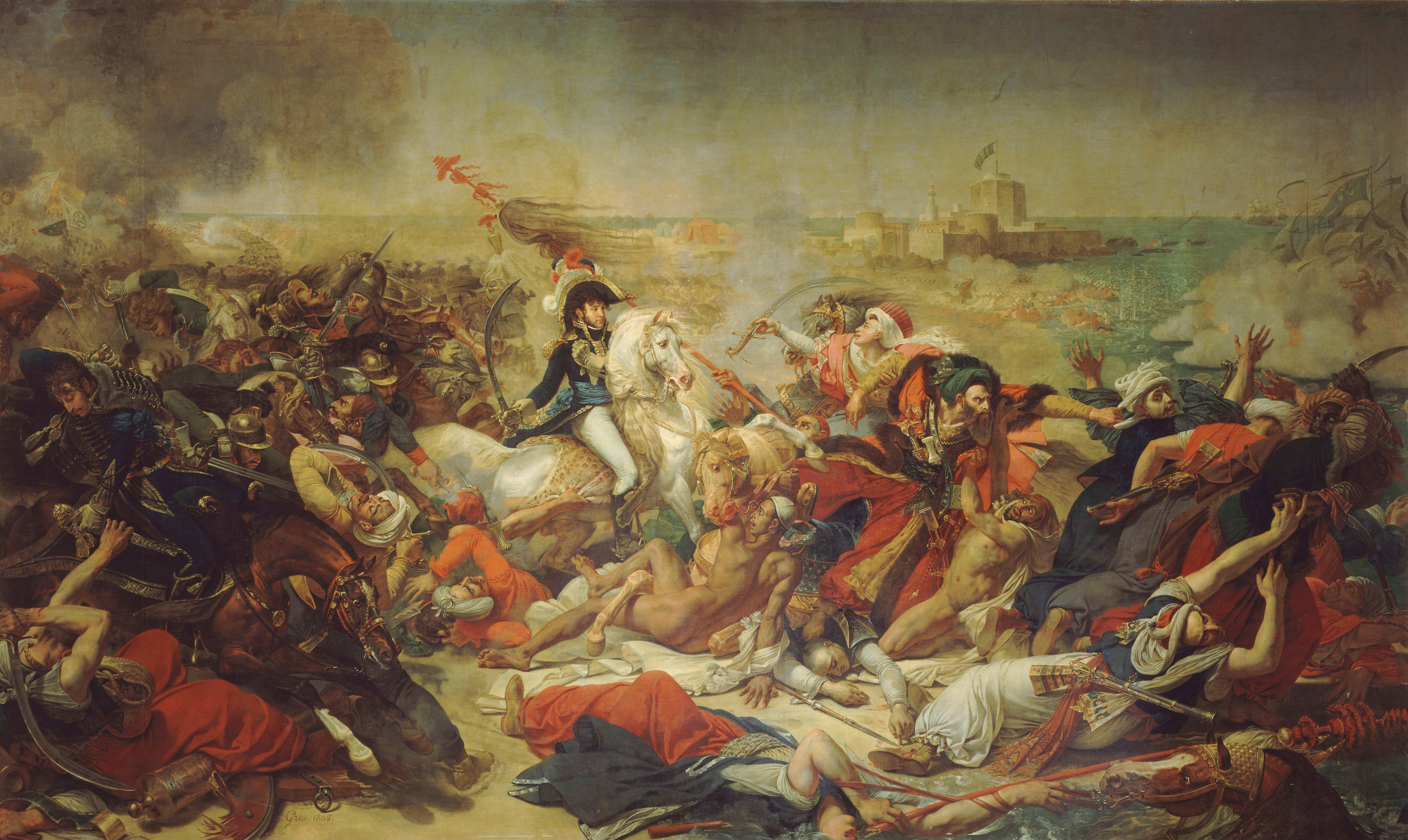
Battle scene painted by Antoine-Jean Gros in 1807: the protagonist is at the center of the composition.

Batalha do Avaí is painted in a Romantic style marked by Baroque vitality and intensity. Unlike many nineteenth-century battle paintings, it largely avoids neoclassical conventions, adopting a highly pictorial composition that breaks with expected norms. Jorge Coli compares its universal vision of battle to interpretations associated with Leonardo da Vinci and later discussed by Fritz Saxl, emphasizing a tragedy without clear heroes.

Nineteenth-century Brazilian visual references were largely French. Critics linked Batalha do Avaí to models ranging from Jacques Courtois—known for dynamic foreground elements such as diagonal flags and charging horsemen—to the neoclassicism of Antoine-Jean Gros, Paul Philippoteaux, François Gérard, and Carle Vernet. Pedro Américo, however, moved away from strict topographical accuracy and returned to Courtois's principles. By structuring the scene in a concentric sweep around the battlefield, he created a deep, almost bird's-eye effect,. Working in Florence, he also drew inspiration from Italian Renaissance painters, especially the Florentines.

He surprised critics with this choice, which was completely out of step with the times.

== Reception and legacy ==
=== Reception ===
When presented in Florence in 1877, the painting impressed critics. Italian critic A. Cercovi described it as a strikingly different battle painting whose ferocity compelled prolonged viewing,.

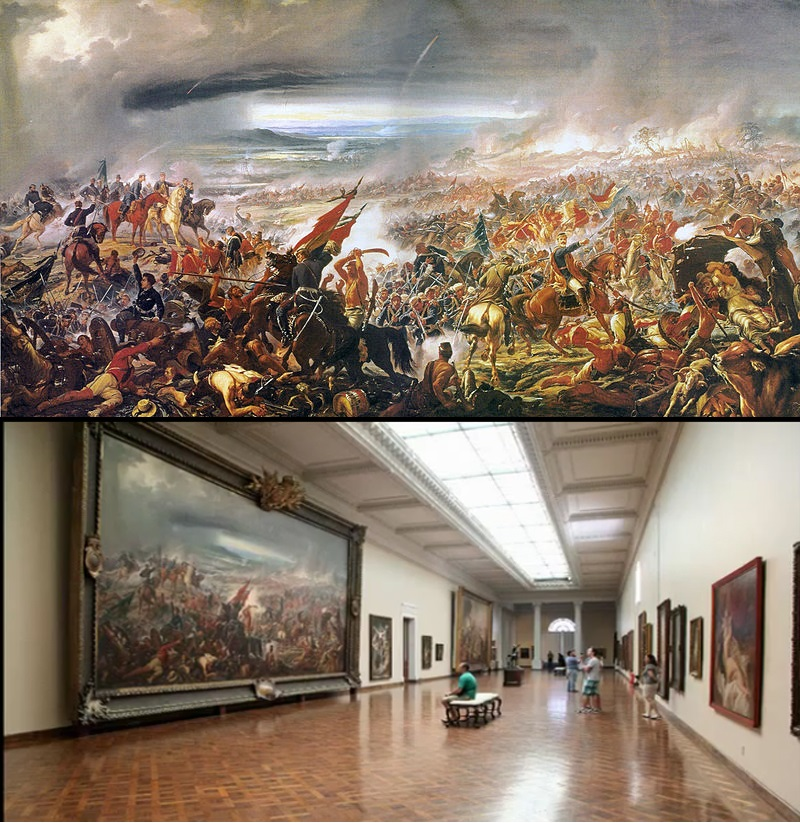
Batalha do Avaí on display at the National Museum of Fine Arts (Brazil). The large size of the canvas can be appreciated.

At its first exhibition at the 1879 Salon, Batalha do Avaí stood out alongside Batalha dos Guararapes by Victor Meirelles. With the two works side by side, comparison between them were inevitable. Both were highly controversial accused them of historical inaccuracy or of idealizing events at a time when academic standards increasingly demanded strict realism. This view was not unanimous. Barão de Teffé, who had taken part in the battle, wrote to Pedro Américo in 1877 that the painting produced a sense of vertigo and evoked Homeric episodes, conveying the nightmare and chaos he himself had experienced in combat.

Pedro Américo's work also faced criticism for its perceived “lack of unity,” while the painting by Victor Meirelles was faulted for lacking the dramatic tone expected of a battle scene. Yet the reception of Américo's canvas was not wholly negative, as noted in an article published in Revista Illustrada on April 5, 1879:

"The exhibition of fine arts is still open, and the Battles of Avaí and Guararapes are the two paintings that hold all attention. Almost always one beside the other, [...] they form a true contrast. While the painting of Mr. Victor impresses by its lack of action, the paralysis of almost all the figures, in the Battle of Avaí everything moves, everything has life, everyone is fighting".

According to Castro, when viewing the two paintings, the spectator felt transported into the events they depict. Beyond their monumental scale, the works present their subjects with strong expressiveness and intensity, portraying decisive moments in Brazilian military history.

However, unlike most of the criticism Pedro Américo received in Brazil, the painting was regarded in Europe as an innovation in a genre already considered outdated.

Throughout the 20th century, critics often judged Batalha do Avaí as an example of poor academic taste. They considered Américo too conservative and bound to outdated academic rules because he did not follow contemporary trends, when in fact he was ahead of his time.

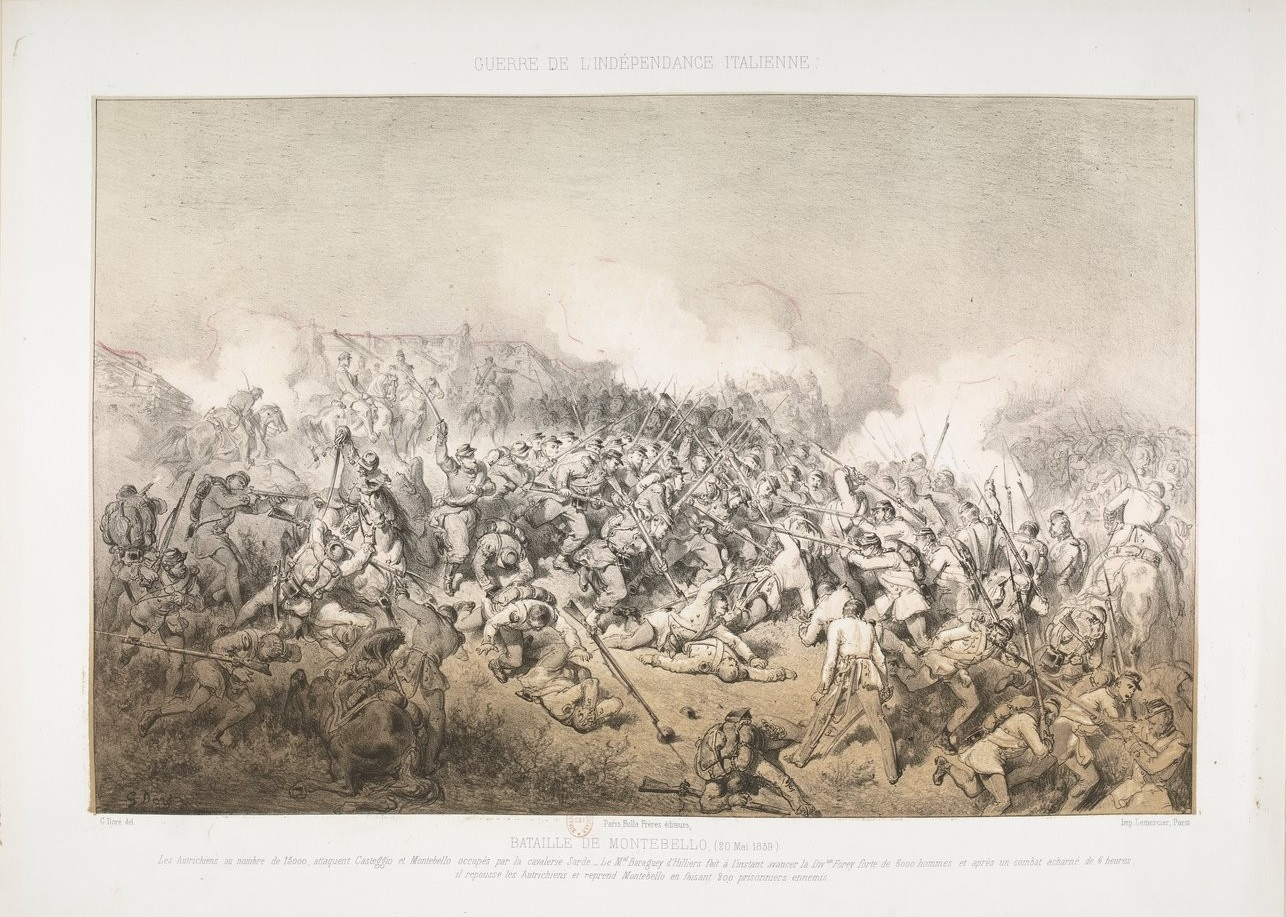
Gustave Doré, Battle of Montebello (1859).

The painter was accused of plagiarism, particularly concerning the horse of the Duke of Caxias, which critics claimed resembled that in Bonaparte at Arcole by Andrea Appiani. He was also said to have borrowed from The Battle of Montebello by Gustave Doré, although no direct copying was proven. The debate, widely covered in the press and known as the “Artistic Question of 1879,” led Pedro Américo to write, in French, the Discours sur le plagiat, (1880), in which he argues that the invention of new forms is not the most important thing in art, but that one should rather continue to perfect existing techniques and follow the "rules of beauty",.

=== Place in Pedro Américo’s Work ===
Philosopher, writer, and religious debater, Pedro Américo had a high opinion of himself and of his own artistic destiny. Batalha do Avaí forms part of the artist's assertion of his crucial role within Brazilian art, claiming an "art nourished by ideas". He wanted to show himself conscious of his links with immediate history and of his role as a visual historian, and assumed this by investing heavily in the making of the work; Pedro Américo did not conceive his painting as just another work dependent on the artist's inspiration, but as a work that draws on new forces.

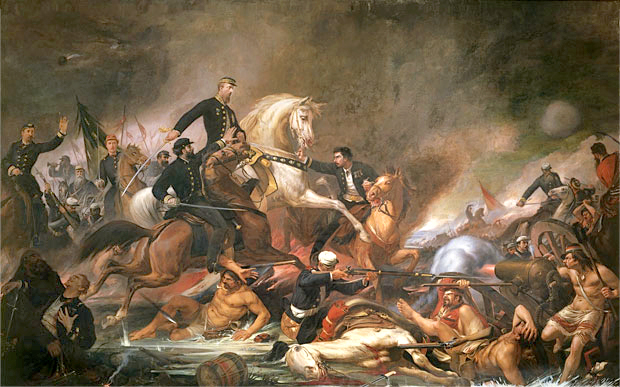
Batalha do Campo Grande (1871, Imperial Museum of Brazil).

Pedro Américo first gained local fame with Batalha do Campo Grande (1871), a large painting celebrating the monarchy and the Count of Eu. A popular, romanticized biography by Luís Guimarães Júnior further increased his visibility,.

He achieved international recognition with Batalha do Avaí, painted in Florence (1872–1877). First exhibited there while still unfinished, it caused a sensation among the art lovers who had gathered in large numbers in the city for the celebrations of the fourth centenary of the birth of Michelangelo. This work, as well as a speech he delivered in two languages before the statue of David on the master of the Renaissance, spread his reputation throughout Europe. The Italian government asked the artist to present a self-portrait among those of the greatest artists of all time in the portrait gallery of the Uffizi, alongside those of Ingres and Flandrin, his own teachers,

When exhibited in Brazil at the 1879 General Exhibition of the AIBA, alongside Batalha dos Guararapes by Victor Meirelles, Batalha do Avaí sparked major controversy. Critics accused it of excessive romanticism, historical inaccuracy, and even plagiarism, Surprisingly, Gonzaga Duque himself-the most influential opponent of the academics-although strongly criticizing the work, found elements in it to say that Américo had finally managed to rid himself of academic orthodoxy and to create a new personal language of great vigour. The debate over which painting was superior became known as the “Artistic Question of 1879”,

Pedro Américo gained prominence as a history painter by fulfilling government demands to depict events that affirmed Brazil's autonomy, territory, and military strength. His interpretive skill ensured lasting support from elite patrons, even after the Republic. Batalha do Avaí belongs to his early official phase; later works include eclectic, sentimental allegories. His historical paintings reflect changing academic styles and sparked strong reactions—admired by some, rejected by others,

=== Place in Brazilian art ===
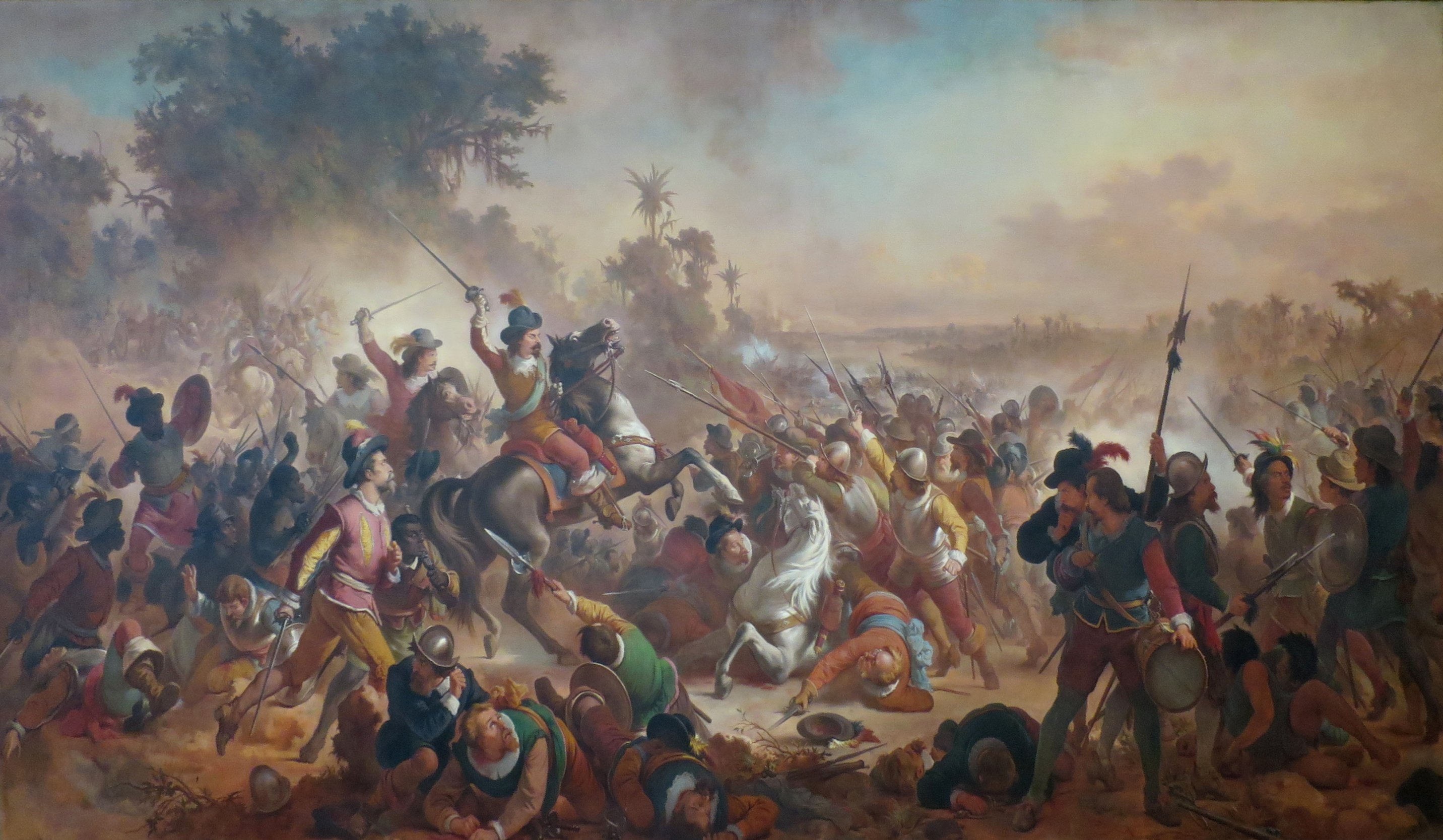
Batalha dos Guararapes, by Victor Meirelles (between 1875 and 1879, National Museum of Fine Arts (Brazil)).

Through commissions for major history paintings, the Brazilian state sought to shape a national identity. Pedro Américo and Victor Meirelles were the two principal figures of this policy, having given their works an epic dimension that reinforces Brazil's recent history and reassures it with respect to its neighbours by showing a powerful Brazilian army. According to Jorge Coli, Batalha do Avaí and Batalha dos Guararapes are works that affirm the construction of the nation's history and represent the achievement of its two greatest painters.

Unlike European history paintings, the two Brazilian masterpieces stand out for the personal investment of their authors, the scale of critical and public expectations and reception, the place they occupy in a country like Brazil, and their size—nearly 60 m^{2} each, which is very rare in international painting. Art historian Jorge Coli sees this vast format as a grand affirmation of national ambition, echoing Mário de Andrade’s ironic slogan about Brazil’s greatness and enhancing the works’ impact on viewers

Although Batalha do Avaí could have been just another history painting like many produced in Europe at the time, it became a landmark and an exceptional work in Brazilian art. According to art historian Jorge Coli, Pedro Américo and Victor Meirelles were aware of the role their art played for the nation: their paintings were not simply part of a rich artistic tradition, but monumental and definitive works within Brazilian art

== Bibliography ==
- Amayo, Enrique (1995). La guerra del Paraguay.
- Barros, F. (2006). Pedro Américo.
- Castro, R. (2005). Arte e história.
- Castro, R. (2007). Pintura histórica brasileira.
- Castro, R. (2008). História e pintura.
- Coli, Jorge (2002). Como estudar a arte brasileira do século XIX?.
- Coli, Jorge (2005). Arte brasileira.
- Machado, A. (2006). Fotografia e arte.
- Schilchta, R. (2006). Pedro Américo.
- Schwarcz, Lilia Moritz (2013). As barbas do imperador.
