= José Antônio Correia da Câmara, 2nd Viscount of Pelotas =

Brazilian politician (1824–1893)

José Antônio Correia da Câmara 2nd Viscount of Pelotas
- José Câmara c. 1880

Minister of War
- In office 28 March 1880 – 15 May 1881
- Monarch: Pedro II
- Prime Minister: José Antônio Saraiva
- Preceded by: Homem de Melo
- Succeeded by: Franklin Dória

President of Rio Grande do Sul
- In office 15 November 1889 – 10 February 1890
- President: Deodoro da Fonseca
- Preceded by: Justo de Azambuja Rangel
- Succeeded by: Júlio Frota
- In office 8 June 1892 – 16 June 1892
- President: Floriano Peixoto
- Preceded by: Republican Office Established per the 1891 Gaucho Governing Board
- Succeeded by: Vitorino Monteiro

Personal details
- Born: 17 February 1824 Porto Alegre, Rio Grande do Sul, Brazil
- Died: 18 September 1893 (aged 69) Rio de Janeiro, Rio de Janeiro, Brazil

Military service
- Allegiance: Empire of Brazil; Brazil
- Branch: Imperial Brazilian Army; Brazilian Army
- Years of service: 1839–1892
- Rank: Marshal
- Battles/wars: Ragamuffin War; Platine War; Uruguayan War; Paraguayan War; Corrientes campaign; Siege of Uruguaiana; Humaitá campaign; Battle of Curuzu; Battle of Curupayty; Pikysyry campaign; Battle of Avay; Campaign of the Hills; Battle of Tupí-hú; Battle of Acosta Ñu; Battle of Caraguataí; Battle of Lomaruguá; Battle of Cerro Corá

José Antônio Correia da Câmara, 2nd Viscount of Pelotas (17 February 1824 – 18 September 1893) was a Brazilian Marshal, noble, and politician who was notable for his participation in the Battle of Cerro Corá in the Paraguayan War.

== Biography ==
Câmara was the son of Commander José Antonio Fernandes de Lima and Flora Correia da Câmara, he was the maternal grandson of the first Viscount of Pelotas .

He enlisted on the 15th of September, 1839 in the 3rd Cavalry Regiment, marching on the same day to fight the Farroupilha revolutionaries . He also took part in the Platine War, under the orders of Brigadier Manuel Marques de Sousa.

In 1851 he married his niece Maria Rita Fernandes Pinheiro (1829 - 1914), daughter of the Viscount of São Leopoldo, and settled at Solar dos Câmara, in Porto Alegre. They had five children.

In the Uruguayan War in 1864, despite being a cavalryman, he volunteered to participate in the Siege of Paysandú, Uruguay.

Câmara was considered to be a Hero of the Paraguayan War, he helped in the retaking of Uruguaiana and participated in the battles of Curuzu, Curupaiti, Avaí and Campo Grande, among others. His bravery in the Battle of Avaí earned him promotion to Brigadier General. His troops attacked the last Paraguayan camp, in Cerro Corá, where Solano López was wounded and then shot in the banks of the Aquidabã stream. From him came the order of surrender to the Paraguayan dictator, answered with the dismal: "Muero con mi patria!" Câmara was promoted to Marshal in 1870, shortly after the war, in recognition of his services he was awarded the noble title of Viscount of Pelotas.

He was Minister of War of Brazil, War Councilor, Senator of the Empire of Brazil for the Liberal Party from 1880 to 1889 in the Saraiva Cabinet of 1880.

He was appointed first President of Rio Grande do Sul after the proclamation of the First Brazilian Republic and decorated the following year as Marshal Câmara. He remained in government for only 3 months due to disagreements between members of the Liberal Party and the Republican Party .

His grandson and biographer, Rinaldo Pereira da Câmara, wrote the book "O Marechal Câmara", in three volumes, describing the life of the Viscount of Pelotas.
