= Battle of Tupí-hú =

1869 Paraguayan War battle

- Part of the Paraguayan War
Date	May 30, 1869
Location	Tupí-hú pass, Paraguay
Result	Brazilian victory

Belligerents
Empire of Brazil	Paraguay

Commanders and leaders
Correia da Câmara	Manoel Galeano

Strength
500	1,052

Casualties and losses
126: 111 wounded 15 dead	937: 350 prisoners 87 wounded 500 dead

The Battle of Tupí-hú was a battle fought on May 30, 1869, by Brazilian and Paraguayan forces during the Paraguayan War, part of the beginning of the Campaign of the Hills. It was a Brazilian victory despite a Paraguayan advantage in numbers.

The allied army was advancing slowly in central Paraguay and gearing up to resume campaigning against the reorganized Paraguayan army which had been mostly destroyed during the Pikysyry campaign some months earlier. A Brazilian unit had been tasked with finding a Paraguayan column operating near the Jejuí Guazú river, which it proceeded to engage and defeat.

== Engagement ==
As the allied armies advanced through the hills of Central Paraguay, chasing Paraguayan president López's remaining forces after the bloody Pikysyry campaign, intelligence was obtained indicating that a Paraguayan column, 1,200 men strong, was stationed on the eastern shore of the Jejuí Guazú river, a position oblique to the axis the allies were advancing at. The allied commander, Gaston, Count of Eu, ordered a detachment to attack it on the 17th of May, composed by men from the 2nd Cavalry Division and the 10th Cavalry Brigade, together with an infantry battalion and two guns, totalling 500 troops, under general Câmara.

Aware of this movement, the Paraguayan column withdrew on the 21st, however, and some days later reached Tupí-hú, a pass on the Aguaray Guazú river. On May 30 the Imperial army arrived, and by 10 a.m. battle had begun with the Brazilian artillery firing against the Paraguayan troops, which had assumed a position on the dry river bed. Lieutenant Colonel Galeano's (Note: According to Doratioto, he was a major.) troops were anchored on the right by a forest and on the left by a swamp on which a trench had been dug. A swift Brazilian attack, under rain, which made the Paraguayan matchlocks unable to fire, and supported by artillery fire and cavalry flanking attacks managed to defeat the defenders quickly, leaving 500 dead and 350 prisoners on the Paraguayan side, amongst them many children and teenagers; the Brazilians suffered 126 casualties. Reportedly, 800 prisoners were made on the action, but most of these were slain afterwards. 18 guns, gold and silver, thousands of head of cattle and more than 3,000 women were also captured after the battle.

Lieutenant Colonel Galeano, one of the few Paraguayans who managed to escape, was executed for cowardice after being captured by Paraguayan forces later.
