= Waldemar Levy Cardoso =

Brazilian field marshal (1900–2009)

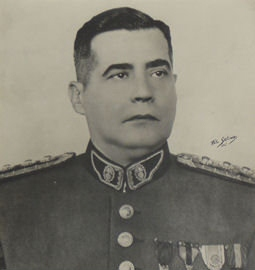
- Born: 4 December 1900; Rio de Janeiro, Brazil
- Died: 13 May 2009 (aged 108); Rio de Janeiro, Brazil
- Military career
- Allegiance: Brazil
- Branch: Brazilian Army
- Service years: 1914–1966
- Rank: Marshal
- Unit: Artillery Battalion
- Conflicts: Tenente revolts; Revolution of 1930; World War II; Italian campaign

Waldemar Levy Cardoso (4 December 1900 – 13 May 2009) was the last living Marshal of the Brazilian Army.

== Biography ==
Cardoso was of Jewish Algerian-Moroccan descent and was born on Rua Evaristo da Veiga in Rio de Janeiro.

He graduated from military college at the top of his class in late-1918 (making him a World War I-era veteran although he never saw combat). In 1924, he took part in the uprising against the Brazilian Federal Government and also fought in the Revolution of 1930.

During World War II, Cardoso – at this time a lieutenant colonel – commanded an artillery battalion with the Brazilian Expeditionary Force. During the Allies' Italian campaign, he was mentioned in dispatches in World War II.

He converted to Catholicism in 1953. Between 1953 and 1954, he was the commander of the 2nd Artillery Regiment, in Itu, São Paulo.

Cardoso was promoted to Field Marshal upon his retirement in 1966. After his retirement, he acted as president of Petrobrás between March–October 1969, acting as company's counselor between 1971 and 1985. He lived on Rua Tonelero in the Copacabana district of Rio de Janeiro.

In 2007, at the age of 107 years, he returned to Itu to see the party of the ninetieth anniversary of the 2nd Light Artillery Group, the modern designation of the old Regiment he had commanded. He died in the Hospital Central do Exército on 13 May 2009. Upon his death, he was the last Brazilian Field Marshal, the oldest World War II veteran and the last surviving World War I veteran from Brazil.

== Decorations ==
During his career, Cardoso was awarded with several decorations, including the:

Brazil

- Combat Cross Second Class
- Brazilian Expeditionary Force Campaign Cross
- Order of Military Merit
- Military Medal in Gold with Platinum bar (for 50 years of active duty)
- Brazilian War Medal

United States

- Bronze Star

Italy

- Croce Al Valore Militare

France

- Croix de Guerre avec Palme

== See also ==
- List of centenarians
- List of last surviving World War I veterans by country
