= Nuta James =

Brazilian politician

Nuta Bartlett James (May 8, 1885 – April 6, 1976), also known as Benevenuta Monteiro James, was a Brazilian revolutionary and feminist.

== Life ==
Nuta Bartlett James was born in Alegrete, Brazil, in the border zone with Uruguay and Argentina. Her birth in 1885 came in the final years of the Empire of Brazil, when two popular movements were bringing Brazilians into the streets: abolitionism and republicanism.

James was a granddaughter of the baron of São Borja, a city in the Brazilian state of Rio Grande do Sul. Her paternal grandfather, Baron Vitorino José Carneiro Monteiro, had an illustrious military career: Though he was born in Recife, he participated in memorable campaigns in Uruguay and Paraguay, having also fought in Pernambuco, Panelas, Miranda, and Jacuípe.

Her mother was Sarah Chermont Monteiro, and her father was Victorino Ribeiro Carneiro Monteiro, who represented her native state, Rio Grande do Sul, in Brazil's Republican Constituent Assembly in 1891. She was educated at Colégio Sion in Petrópolis.

In 1911, she married Bartlett George James, a man of English origin who was elected as federal deputy for the then-Federal District of Rio de Janeiro. The couple dedicated themselves to campaigning for Nilo Peçanha for the presidency of the republic. When Peçanha was defeated by the corrupt government machine, the Bartlett James house in Todos os Santos became a locus of resistance to the government of Epitácio Pessoa, culminating in the 18 of the Copacabana Fort revolt and the Realengo Military Academy revolt, both of which were stifled. Her husband was imprisoned on Rasa Island, where he continued to refuse to communicate with the authorities. Then Marshall Fontoura's famous police unit, under the government of Artur Bernardes, attempted to invade her house on the pretext of searching for bombs. Nuta James responded with gunfire, and she was arrested and imprisoned for two and a half months. Her husband remained imprisoned for 26 months.

Dedicated to armed resistance with the goal of social reform in Brazil, James participated in the revolutionary movement in São Paulo in 1924, under the leadership of the general Isidoro Dias Lopes. From 1922 to 1930, she was involved in several anti-government conspiracies and handled the distribution of an underground revolutionary magazine, O 5 de Julho. Her husband was imprisoned again, along with one of their younger sons, on the eve of the Revolution of 1930, an uprising that she was strongly committed to. When Washington Luís' government surrendered on October 24, 1930, Nuta James headed alone to the prison to free her husband and son. The warden disappeared, and the couple assumed control of the penitentiary, keeping non-political prisoners from escaping.

For a while they supported the provisional government of Getúlio Vargas, but when the Constitutionalist Revolution began in 1932, they joined the São Paulo revolution. The government emerged victorious, and Vargas went on to found the Estado Novo regime in 1937. From then on, the couple refused to engage politically with Vargas.

Widowed in 1939, Nuta James focused her efforts on completing the educations of her nine children. But a few years later, with the redemocratization of the country, she fully returned to politics, participating in the founding of the National Democratic Union (UDN), for which she ran for a seat in the national legislature. Her election loss was primarily attributed to a campaign initiated by the Catholic Church, which labeled her a communist due to her relationships with Luís Carlos Prestes, Arcelina Mochel, and other communists.

Always on the front lines of the UDN's campaigns, she fought for Eduardo Gomes, Juarez Távora, and Jânio Quadros. She was heavily involved in Brazil's women's rights movement and in the "Oil Is Ours" campaign for natural resource nationalization, whose rallies she stayed at until the bitter end, even though they were often broken up by police on horseback. For her enthusiasm, she was chosen as national director of the UDN. She was an active participant in the campaigns of 1945, which brought down Getúlio Vargas, and of 1964, in opposition to the situation in which the country found itself, which culminated with the victory of the military movement. She became disillusioned with the direction taken by the movement, however, and James left politics again.

Her final political appearance was in 1974, when she campaigned for the election of her son Victorino James. She died in 1976, in Rio de Janeiro. Several places have been named in her honor, including Colégio Estadual Nuta Bartlett James in Nilópolis, Nuta James Avenue in Barra da Tijuca, and Terminal Rodoviário Nuta James in Rio.
