= Modesto González =

Argentine artist (fl. 1865–1908)

Modesto González (fl. 1865–1908) was an Argentine painter known for his paintings of the Paraguayan War.

González served in the Argentine army during the 1860s, participating in several battles during the War of the Triple Alliance phase of the Paraguayan War. González tended to focus on individual soldiers, paying particular attention to the details of their uniforms and the ethnic diversity of the individuals. However, he also painted some larger battle scenes, with a focus on heroic actions of Argentine officers, including moments from the Battles of Boquerón, Tuyutí, Piribebuy, and Acosta Ñu. He was acquaninted with José Ignacio Garmendia and his circle of artists contributing to the Álbum de la Guerra del Paraguay series. Although González is uncredited in the series, some of the paintings attributed to Garmendia are possibly copies of González's work or misattributed. In 1922, in his survey of Argentinian artists, José María Lozano Mouján praised González for his depiction of soldiers and historical accuracy.
