= Vitorino José Carneiro Monteiro, Baron of São Borja =

Brazilian general (1816–1877)

Baron of São Borja
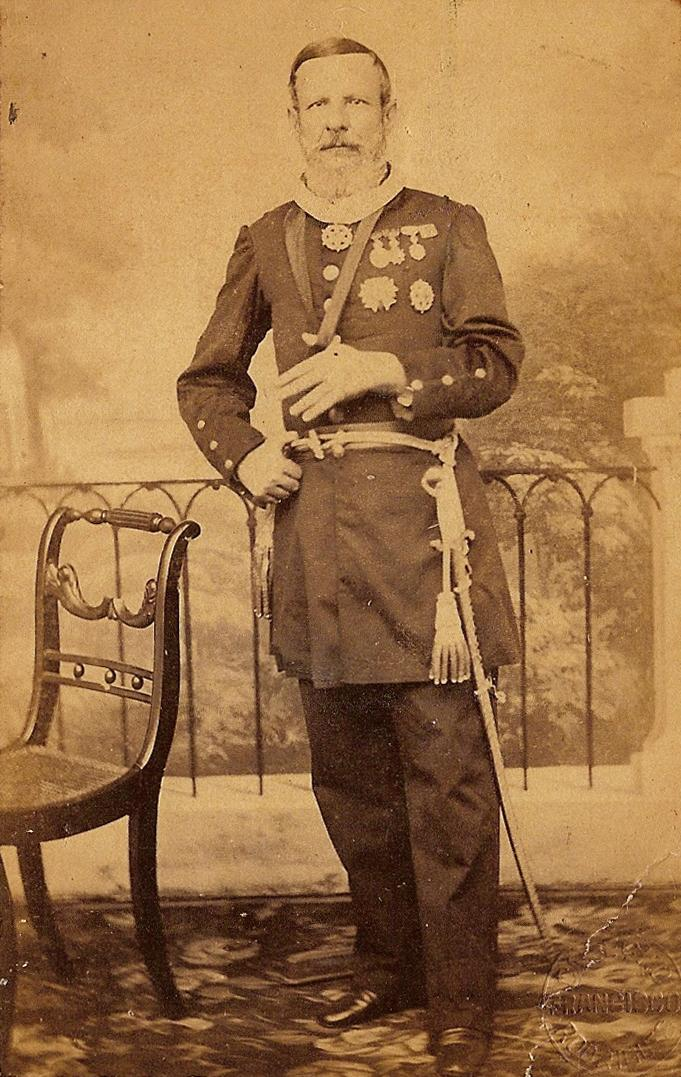
- Born: 1816; Recife, Pernambuco, Brazil
- Died: 24 October 1877 (aged 60–61); Location unknown
- Spouse: Benevenuta Amália Ribeiro (m. 1842)
- Military career
- Allegiance: Brazil
- Branch: Imperial Brazilian Army
- Service years: 1833–1877
- Rank: Lieutenant General
- Conflicts: Ragamuffin War; Paraguayan War; Humaitá campaign; Battle of Tuyutí (WIA); Campaign of the Hills; Battle of Caguijuru

Vitorino José Carneiro Monteiro, Baron of São Borja (1816 – 24 October 1877) was a Brazilian lieutenant general of the Paraguayan War. He was one of the primary commanders at the Battle of Tuyutí and had an extensive career during the 19th century.

== Biography ==
He was the son of Major João Francisco Carneiro Monteiro and Isabel Rosa Ramos. On 2 February 1842, he married Benevenuta Amália Ribeiro, daughter of Marshal Bento Manuel Ribeiro and Maria Manso da Conceição.

While still a student, he marched to the wars of Panelas, Miranda and Jacuípe, in Pernambuco where he was seriously wounded and discharged in 1833. As an amanuensis for the Recife police in 1836, he fought in Rio Grande do Sul during the Ragamuffin War in 1837, being promoted to Major. He also campaigned in Uruguay in 1854, being promoted to commander of the first brigade and promoted to lieutenant colonel. During the Paraguayan War, he was promoted to brigadier general.

He participated in many engagements, notably the Battle of Tuyutí on 24 May 1866 where he commanded the 6th Brigade but was wounded and was brevetted marshal for his acts of bravery. He was commander of the arms of Pernambuco in 1870 and of Rio Grande do Sul in 1871. In 1877, he was promoted to lieutenant general.

As a fidalgo, he was a knight of Order of the Rose, commander of the Imperial Order of Aviz, and received the medals of merit and military bravery.

He was the grandfather of feminist leader Nuta James.
