= Carlos Morphi =

Paraguayan politician

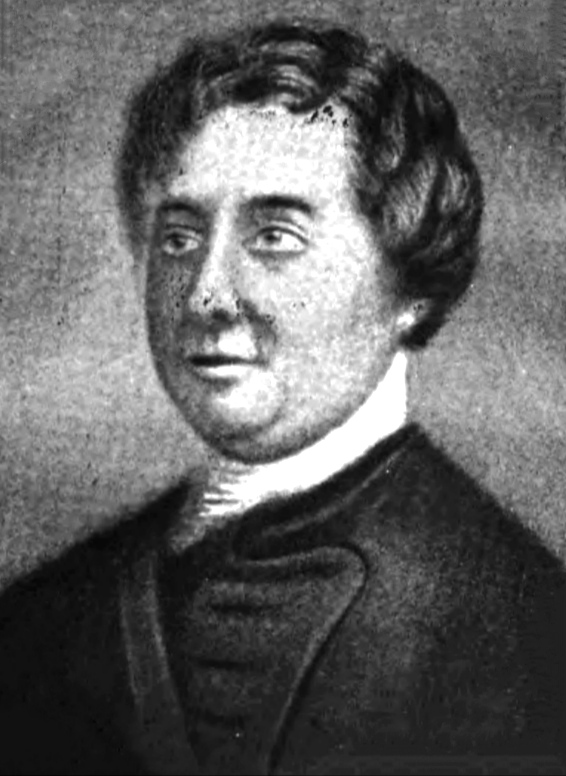

Capitán General Carlos Morphi was an Irish Lt. Colonel who worked for Spain. He became the Colonial governor of Paraguay in 1766. He had good relations with the Jesuits. He was also, in 1770, the founder of Eusebio Ayala, Paraguay.
