= Viscount of Pelotas =

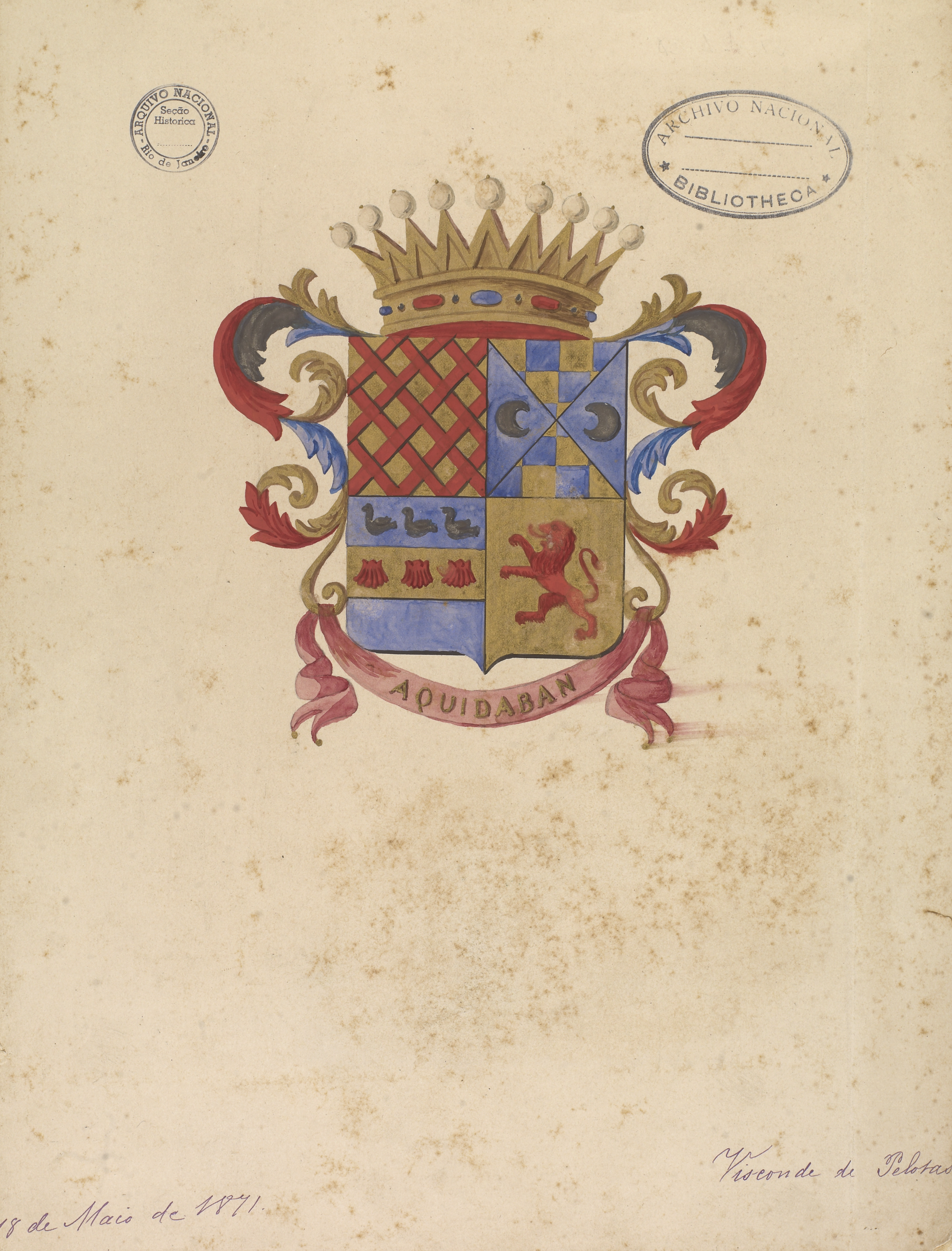
- Coat of arms of José Correia da Câmara, the second and last holder of the title
- Creation date: 12 October 1826
- Created by: Pedro I of Brazil
- Peerage: Peerage of Brazil
- First holder: Patrício Correia da Câmara
- Last holder: José Correia da Câmara
- Status: Extinct
- Extinction date: 24 February 1891 (Note: All Brazilian titles of nobility were abolished by the Brazilian Republican Constitution of 1891, issued on that date.)
- Seat: Pelotas

The title of Viscount of Pelotas (Portuguese: Visconde de Pelotas) was a Brazilian noble title granted by emperor Pedro I of Brazil to Patrício José Correia da Câmara by decree dated 12 October 1826.

== Titleholders ==
Name	Picture	Birth	Became Viscount	Ceased to be Viscount	Other titles	Marriages
Patrício José Correia da Câmara		12 October 1744	12 October 1826 (Note: Prior to becoming Viscount, Patrício Correia da Câmara received the title of Baron of Pelotas a year earlier on 12 October 1825.)	28 May 1827	1st and only Baron of Pelotas	Joaquina Leocádia da Fontoura
José Antônio Correia da Câmara		17 February 1824	17 March 1870	24 February 1891	–	Maria Rita Fernandes Pinheiro
