= Tobatí District =

- Location within Paraguay
- Coordinates: 25°15′0″S 57°4′0″W
- Country: Paraguay
- Department: Cordillera

Area
  - Total: 286.3 km^{2} (110.5 sq mi)

Population (2022)
  - Total: 27,435
  - Density: 95.83/km^{2} (248.2/sq mi)

Tobatí District is a district in the Cordillera Department of Paraguay. As per the 2022 census, the district had a population of 27,435 individuals.

== Etymology ==
The name derives from the combination of Guaraní usage words of "toba" meaning face and the last part of "moroti" as a suffix, which means white. As per one version, this is attributed to the description of the indigenous inhabitants of the region, who had a pale colored face. As per another version, the name came from the whitish-looking mineral kaolin, found in the region, and used extensively as a raw material for pottery and building construction.

== History ==
Tobatí is one of the oldest settlements in Paraguay, and was founded on 3 October 1539. The region was occupied by the Carias of the Guarani people, who were attacked repeatedly by the Chaqueños. Hence, conquisdator Domingo Martínez de Irala, who made an alliance with the Carians, defended them, and later moved them east. They were later settled in Tobatí, on the banks of the Manduvirá River. It is the birthplace of Pedro Juan Caballero, the leader of Paraguayan independence movement.

== Geography ==
Tobati is a district located in the Cordillera Department in Paraguay. It occupies an area of 286.3 km^{2} (110.5 sq mi). It is located about 72 km (45 mi) from the Paraguayan capital of Asunción, and 17 km (11 mi) from the departmental capital of Caacupé.

== Demographics ==
As per the 2022 census, Tobati district had a population of 27,431 inhabitants of which 14,303 were males and 13,132 were females. It is the second largest district by population in the department of Cordillera. About 47.6% of the population was classified rural, and the rest (52.4%) lived in urban areas. About 27.1% of the population was below the age of fourteen, and 8.9% was more than 65 years of age.
