= Campaign of the Hills =

1869–70 ending phase of the Paraguayan War

- Part of the Paraguayan War
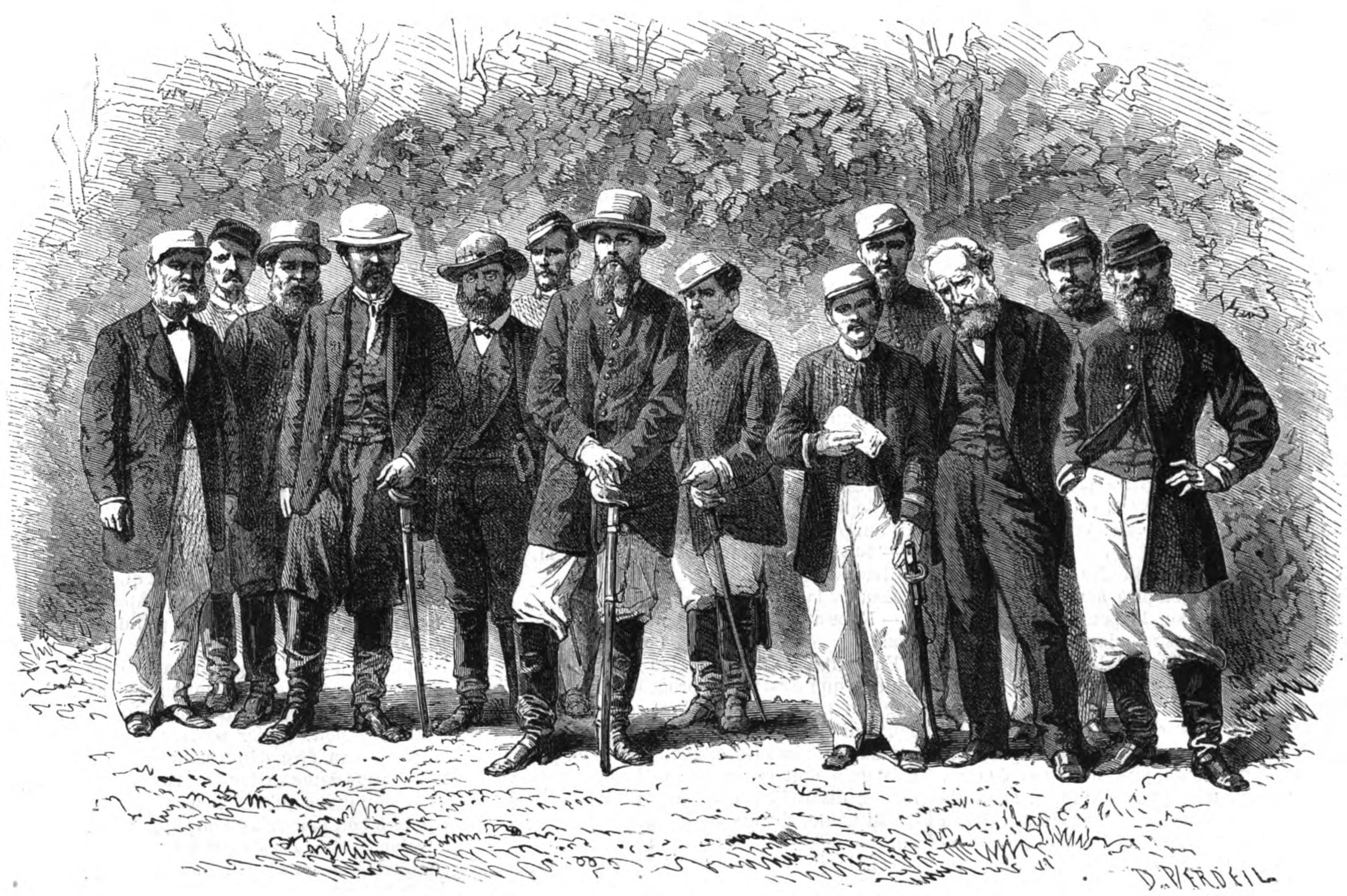
- The Count of Eu and his military staff.
Date	July 1869 - March 1, 1870
Location	Central and Northern Paraguay
Result	Allied victory: End of the Paraguayan War

Belligerents
Paraguay	Empire of Brazil; Argentina

Commanders and leaders
Francisco López †; Domingo Sánchez †; B. Caballero (surrendered); Hilario Marcó (executed); Manoel Galeano; Manuel Bernal; Pedro Caballero (executed); Anselmo Cañete; Ignacio Genes; Pedro Hermosa; Juan López †; Vernal †	Count of Eu; Manuel Luís Osório; José Câmara; Deodoro Fonseca; Vitorino Monteiro; Bento Meneses; João Barreto †; Joca Tavares; Chicuta; Carlos Filho; Delfim Carvalho; Joaquim Inácio; Elisiário Santos; Luis Campos

Strength
13,000 men 8 ships 26 guns 14 cannons	30,757 men 17 ships 47 guns

Casualties and losses
7,971 total casualties 12 guns destroyed 8 ships destroyed	2,853 total casualties

The Campaign of the Hills (Spanish: Campaña de las Cordilleras) was the last campaign of the Paraguayan War, lasting from July 1869 to the end of the war on March 1, 1870. The Paraguayans were completely defeated by the Allies. Brazilian writer Alfredo d'Escragnolle Taunay, Viscount of Taunay took part in the campaign and later wrote about it. At least 5,000 Paraguayans were killed during this campaign.

== Background ==
After the occupation of the Paraguayan capital, Asunción, by the allies, Marshal Luis Alves de Lima e Silva, Duke of Caxias considered the Paraguayan War to be ended with Allied victory. The marshal asked to be relieved of command on 12 Jan. 1869. On 16 April 1869, Prince Gaston, Count of Eu took command of the Allied Army Headquarters in Luque, two days after his arrival in Asunción.

Since Paraguayan President López refused to surrender, the Allies installed a triumvirate in Asunción made of two elderly former exiles, Carlos Loizaga and José Díaz de Bedoya, along with a young ex-soldier turned spy, Cirilo Antonio Rivarola, and decided to continue the war. López decided to resist the Allies in the mountainous region of Northeastern Paraguay. López organized a force of 9,000 men and boys from his headquarters in Cerro León.

== Battle of Piribebuy ==
The Allied attack on the town of Piribebuy, then serving as a temporary capital for the Paraguayan government, lasted 5 hours, ending with the capture of the town and the destruction of its official records.

== Battle of Acosta Ñu ==
The Battle of Acosta Ñu was the last major battle. In this, Bernardino Caballero (who later became President of Paraguay) fought a Brazilian-Argentine combined force of 20,000 under Emperor Pedro II's son-in-law Prince Gaston and future Brazilian president Manoel Deodoro da Fonseca.

== Battle of Cerro Corá ==
The last battle of the campaign was at Cerro Corá, in which a Brazilian force of 4,000 wiped out President López's personal guard of 100-250 soldiers, killing López, Vice President Sánchez and López's son Juan Francisco.

== Bibliography ==
- Díaz Gavier, Mario, En tres meses en Asunción, Ed. del Boulevard, Rosario, Argentina, 2005. ISBN 987-556-118-5
- Doratioto, Francisco, Maldita Guerra. Nueva Historia de la Guerra del Paraguay, Ed. Emecé, Sao Paulo/Buenos Aires, 2008, pág. 30-35. ISBN 978-950-04-2574-2
- León Pomer, La guerra del Paraguay, Ed. Leviatán, Bs. As., 2008. ISBN 978-9505638536
- Rosa, José María, La guerra del Paraguay y las montoneras argentinas. Buenos Aires: Hyspamérica, 1986. ISBN 950-614-362-5
- Ruiz Moreno, Isidoro J., Campañas militares argentinas, Tomo IV, Ed. Emecé, Bs. As., 2008. ISBN 978-950-620-257-6
- Zenequelli, Lilia, Crónica de una guerra, La Triple Alianza, Ed. Dunken, Bs. As., 1997. ISBN 987-9123-36-0
