= Piribebuy =

District of Paraguay

Coordinates: 25°28′45″S 57°03′00″W

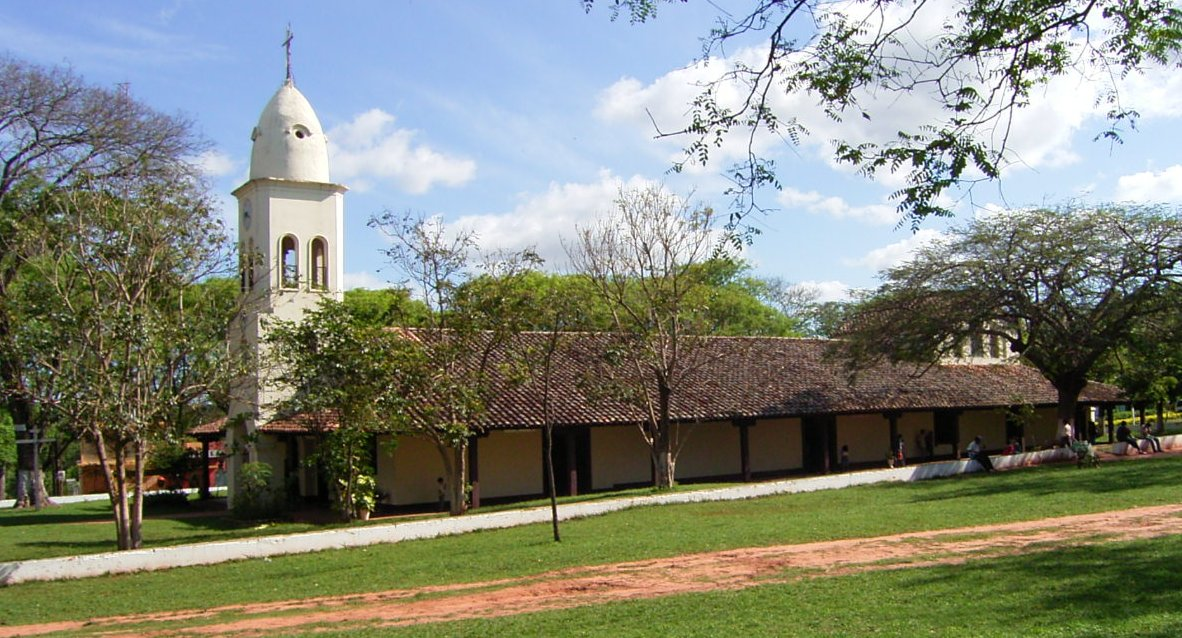
Piribebuy's Church

Piribebuy (Guarani: Pirĩvevúi) is a town and district in the Cordillera Department of Paraguay. It is of spontaneous origin, though some attribute its founding to Martin Ledesma de Valderrama in 1636. Since its founding documents were burned during the Paraguayan War, March 8, 1636, was later appointed as its Day of Establishment. Piribebuy is known for its Church "Dulce Nombre de Jesus", also known as "Ñandejará Guasu," and also has a small history museum dedicated to memorabilia from the War of Triple Alliance, explaining Piribebuy's large role in the war (Battle of Piribebuy), as well as memorabilia from the Chaco War and colonial times.

== History ==
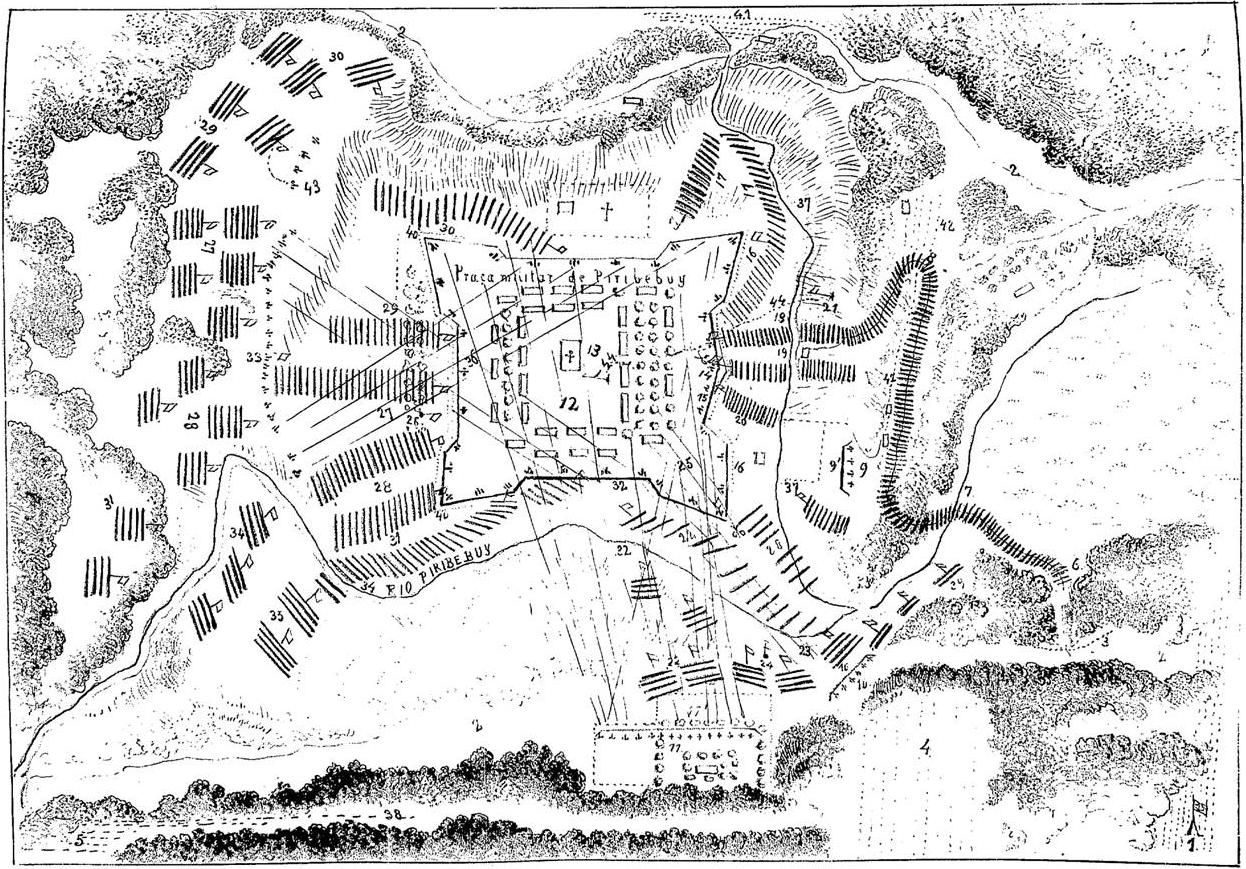
Sketch of the town of Piribebuy, conquered by the Brazilian forces on August 12, 1869, during the Battle of Piribebuy.

Formally known as Capilla Guasú, Piribebuy does not have a known foundation date, due to its possible spontaneous origin, and because the official documentation was destroyed in the grand battle of August 12, 1869. In early times used as a mail-post and spot to rest the horses, the Franciscan Gaspar de Medina constructed, in 1744, a church dedicated to Santo Cristo de los Milagros (Ñandejara Guasu in Guaraní, and in English, Holy Christ of the Miracles).

During the Paraguayan War the city served as the third capital of Paraguay from December 8, 1868 until August 12 of the following year when 1,600 poorly armed men, many of them mere children, spent 5 hours resisting the assault of 20,000 allied Brazilian, Argentine and Uruguayan forces intent on conquest, before finally being overwhelmed At the end of the battle, in which the Hospital de Sangre was burnt down, along with all the wounded inside, many prisoners were decapitated.

== Etymology ==
In the Guarani language, Piribebuy, more correctly pirĩ vevuĩ, means either "smooth sensation" or "shivers." The name is thought to come from the fact that the area has many refreshing streams and cool breezes. Others suggest that the name comes from píri vevúi, which would mean light reeds or straws. This theory is supported by the Guaranis common use of botanical characters as place names. The Piribebuy River, which starts in Piribebuy, ends at the Paraguay River in a site that is full of reeds.

== Geography ==
Piribebuy is located between PY01 and PY02, 13 km from Route I on the branch route Rogelio R. Benítez, which intersects Route I at km 64.

== Subdivision ==
The town of Piribebuy is further divided into barrios (Boroughs) of Centro, Santa Ana, San Blas, Maria Auxilliadora and Virgen de Rosario.

Besides the urban area, the district contains the following compañias (sub-municipalities): 4 de Julio, Cañada, Capilla Cué, Chololó, Colonia Piraretá, Cordillera, Guasú Rocái, Ita Guyrá, Itá Moroti, Itá Moroti Guasu, Itá Moroti'i, Itapé, Ita Ybú, Mcal. Estigarribia, Mcal. Lopéz, Naranjo, Ojopoi, Pasito, Paso Jhú, Presidente Franco, Tape Guasú, Yacarey, Yataity, Yhaca, Yhagui Guasú, Yhaguymi, Ykuá Porá, and Yruguá.

The spelling change stems from the oral Guarani name being transliterated into written Spanish.

== Demographics ==
According to the 2002 National Census, the district has a total population of 19,594 inhabitants, from this total population 9,617 lives in the urban area, almost half of it.

== Economy ==
Tourism plays an important role in the economy of Piribebuy, as people come for the abundant nature that surrounds the city, its rich history, and its famous artisan crafts; most notably, the Poncho Para´í or Poncho de 60 listas ("Poncho of 60 stripes"), whose methods of fabrication are passed generation to generation.

== Transportation ==
The town of Piribebuy is 10 km away from the National Route N° 2, which connects Coronel Oviedo with the country's capital.

== Patron Saints ==
Piribebuy has two patron saints. The first is Ñandejará Guasu, who is celebrated on January 18, and the second is Saint Blaise, who is celebrated on February 3.
