= Battle of Piribebuy =

1869 Paraguayan War battle

- Part of the Paraguayan War
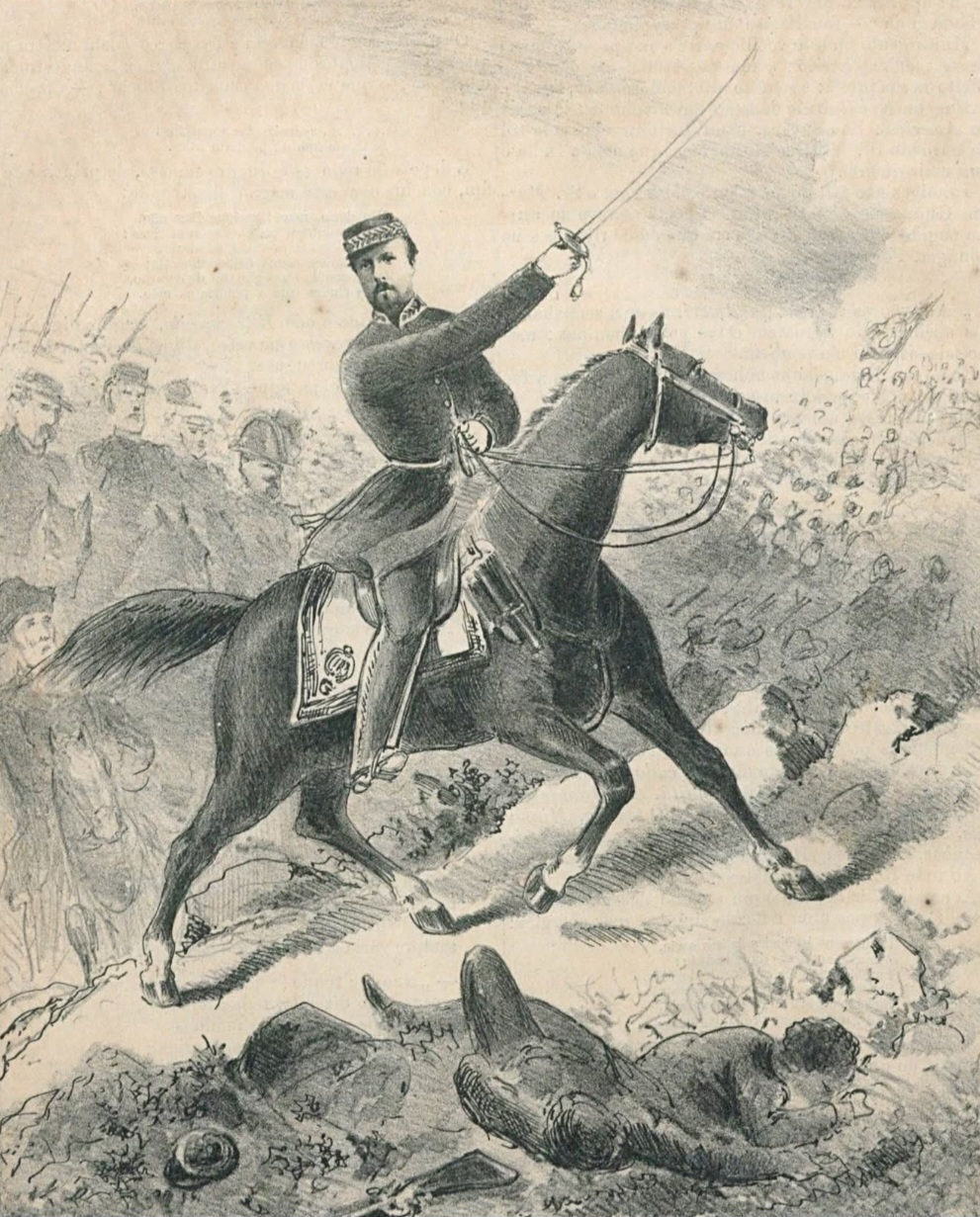
- The Count of Eu leading the Imperial Army troops at the Battle of Piribebuy
Date	12 August 1869
Location	Piribebuy, Cordillera Department, Paraguay
Result	Brazilian victory

Belligerents
Paraguay	Empire of Brazil

Commanders and leaders
Pedro Caballero (executed); (Paraguay) Hilario Amarilla	Count of Eu; Manuel Luís Osório; João Mena Barreto †

Strength
1,600 men 12 guns	20,090 men 47 guns

Casualties and losses
1,600: 730 killed 700 wounded 170 captured	610: 68 killed 542 wounded

The Battle of Piribebuy was fought on 12 August 1869 in the Paraguayan town of Piribebuy, which was then serving as a temporary capital of the Paraguayan government. The Paraguayan defenders, who were poorly armed and included children, fought the attacks of the Allied forces, led by French-born Brazilian general prince Gaston of Orleans, the Count of Eu, son-in-law of Emperor Pedro II of Brazil. The town refused two peace envoys calling for surrender, sent by the Count of Eu. At 04:00, the Brazilian batteries surrounding the town started a bombardment which lasted until 08:00, when the infantry charged. General João Manuel Mena Barreto was mortally wounded leading a cavalry charge against the Paraguayans.

The battle lasted for five hours, with the Allies, who had overwhelming numerical advantage, capturing the town. The town's hospital was burned and official documents were lost in the resulting fire.

== Gallery ==
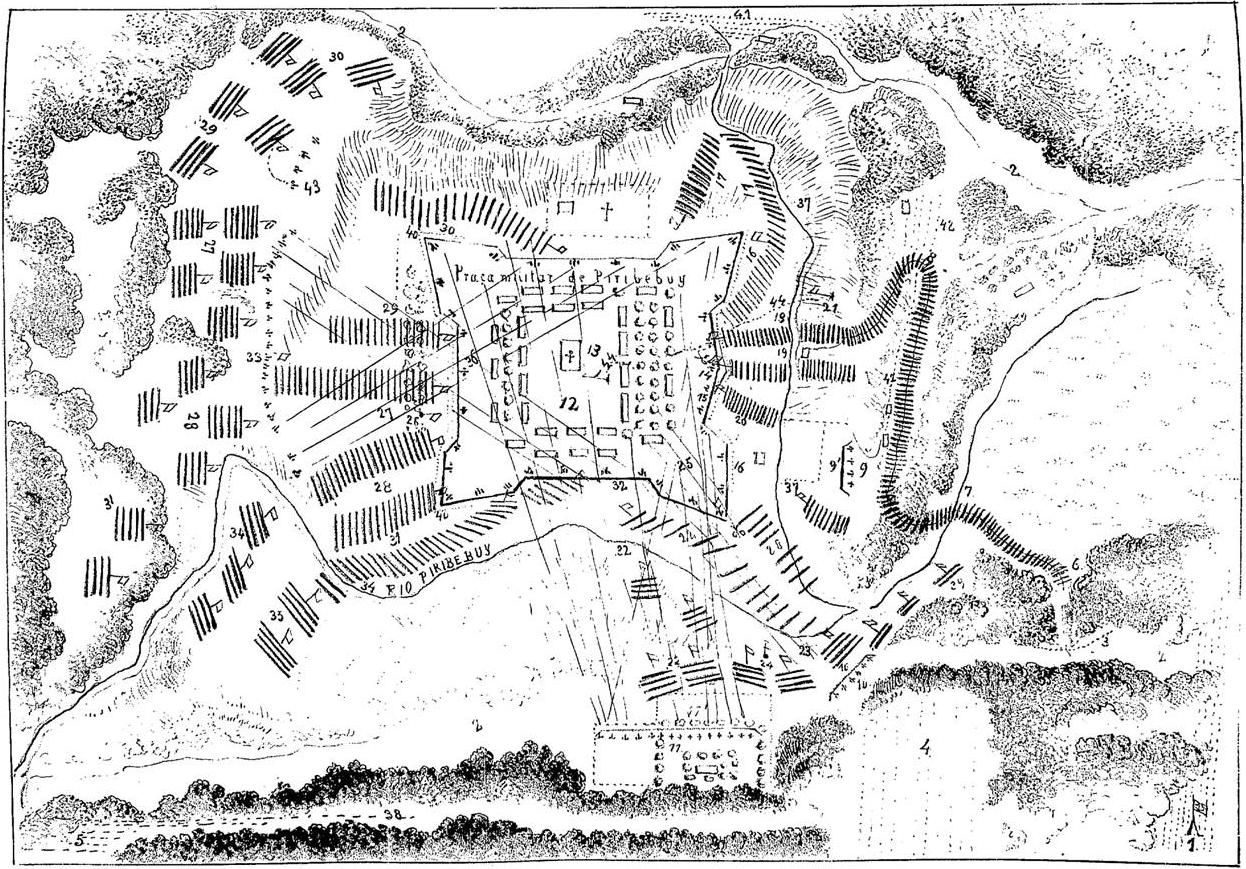
Sketch of the battle of Piribebuy.
