= Battle of Acosta Ñu =

1869 battle of the Paraguayan War

- Part of the Paraguayan War
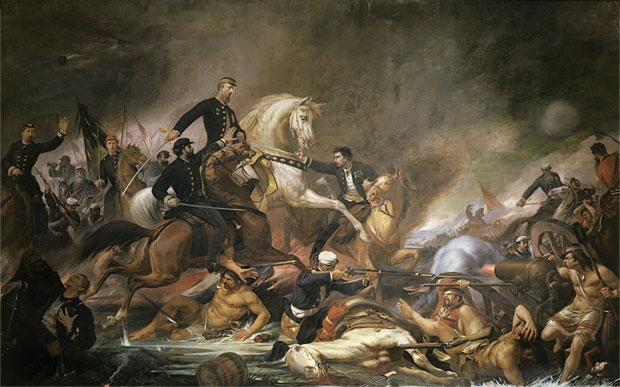
- Battle of Campo Grande, by Pedro Américo.
Date	August 16, 1869
Location	Eusebio Ayala, Paraguay
Result	Allied victory

Belligerents
Paraguay	Empire of Brazil; Argentina

Commanders and leaders
Bernardino Caballero	Gaston of Orleans

Strength
3,646; 12 cannons	1st and 2nd Corps more than 20,000 Brazilian and Argentine soldiers

Casualties and losses
3,500: 2,000 killed 1,500 wounded and captured	602: 182 killed 420 wounded

The Battle of Acosta Ñu (Guarani: Acosta Ñu ñorairõ), also known as the Children's Battle (Spanish: Batalla de los Niños) in Paraguay and the Battle of Campo Grande (Portuguese: Batalha de Campo Grande) in Brazil, took place on 16 August 1869. It was the last major engagement of the Paraguayan War between the Triple Alliance and Paraguay. The 3,500 poorly armed Paraguayans, mostly boys between nine and fifteen years old, old men and wounded combatants, confronted 20,000 Brazilian and Argentine veteran soldiers.

== Background ==
In the middle of 1869, the Paraguayan Army was in full retreat and Asunción was under allied occupation. Francisco Solano López, the Paraguayan president, refused to surrender and retreated to the hills, vowing to keep fighting to the end. The commander of the allied forces, Luís Alves de Lima e Silva, the Duke of Caxias, suggested that the war was militarily over. Pedro II, the Brazilian emperor, refused to stop the campaign until López surrendered. Caxias then resigned and was replaced by the Emperor's son-in-law, Prince Gaston of Orleans, the Count of Eu.

The Count of Eu and the main Allied troops advanced and took Caacupé on August 15, though López had already moved to Caraguatay, leaving Bernardino Caballero to guard the rear. In an attempt to block the Paraguayan Army from retreating to Caraguatay, the Count of Eu sent a cavalry division to Barrero Grande (now Eusebio Ayala), while the 1st Corps pursued López. Before engaging Caballero at Acosta Ñu, the cavalry division was reinforced by the Brazilian army's 2nd Corps, including Argentine soldiers under the command of Col. Luis María Campos.

== Battle ==
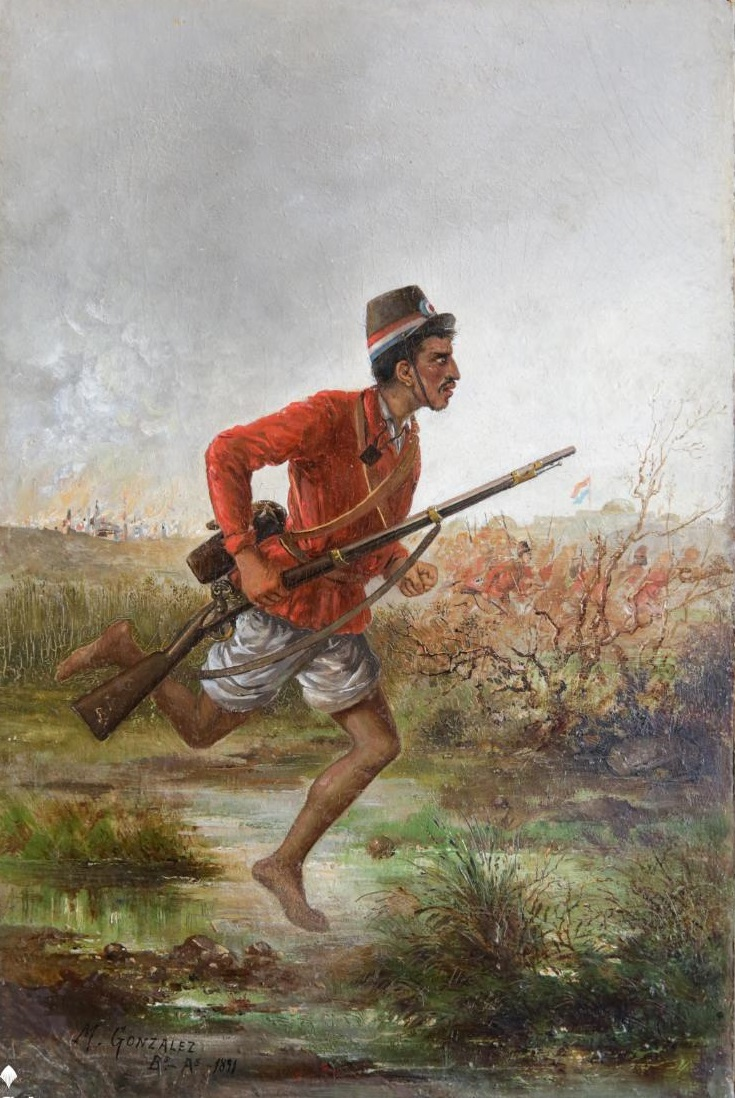
Paraguayan child soldier at Acosta Ñu (1891) by Modesto González

Allied troops reached the rear of Paraguayan forces near Barrero Grande on August 16. The allied troops consisted of some 20,000 Brazilian and Argentine soldiers, facing about 4,300 Paraguayan teenagers and adult veterans. To disguise how young the bulk of his forces were, Caballero disguised many of the nine- and ten-year-olds among his ranks with false beards. The battle began at 8:30 in the morning in on Campo Grande, also known as Acosta Ñu ('Acosta's Field'), an open plain of about 12 square kilometres (4.6 mi^{2}) favorable to the Brazilian cavalry. However, because the approach to the field was narrowed by the confluence of two streams, Arroyo Yukyry and Arroyo Piribebuy, the Allied 1st Infantry Corps, under the command of Col. Manoel Deodoro da Fonseca, led the initial attack.

Over the next eight hours, the Paraguayans offered fierce resistance, retreating across Arroyo Yukyry where they had eight cannons and cover. They set fires and used the smoke to hide their movements, but they soon spread through the dry grass. The Paraguayans repelled an attempt by the Allied troops to cross the stream, but the Count of Eu's artillery fire caused heavy losses for the Paraguayans, allowing the Allied 4th Cavalry Brigade to cross the stream and attack the defenders' flank as the Caballero’s troops assumed a classic square formation to defend themselves with bayonets.

By this time, the Allied 2nd Corps reached the Paraguayan rear, blocking a retreat. The Allied infantry attacked with bayonets, overran the Paraguayan positions, and captured Caballero's cannons though Caballero was able to escape with a small number of troops.

Many of the injured soldiers died due to fires that swept the battlefield. Some scholars, such as Julio José Chiavenatto, accused the Count of Eu of ordering fires set to kill fallen soldiers, including burning a field hospital. A contemporary report from the Viscount of Taunay, who was present at the battle, however, blames the Paraguayans for setting fires to hide their movements that then spread out of control.

== Legacy ==
The battle of Acosta Ñu is depicted in the painting Batalha de Campo Grande by Pedro Américo, as well as in a series of paintings by Argentine painter Modesto González. The Viscount of Taunay provided an eyewitness account of the battle in his book Recordações de Guerra e de Viagem (Memories of War and Travel).

Each year in Paraguay, August 16th is marked as "Día del Niño del Paraguay" (Children's Day of Paraguay) to commemorate the memory of the children who lost their lives in the battle. The holiday was first declared in 1948 by provisional president Juan Manuel Frutos.
