= Sacking of Asunción =

1869 looting

- Part of the Paraguayan War
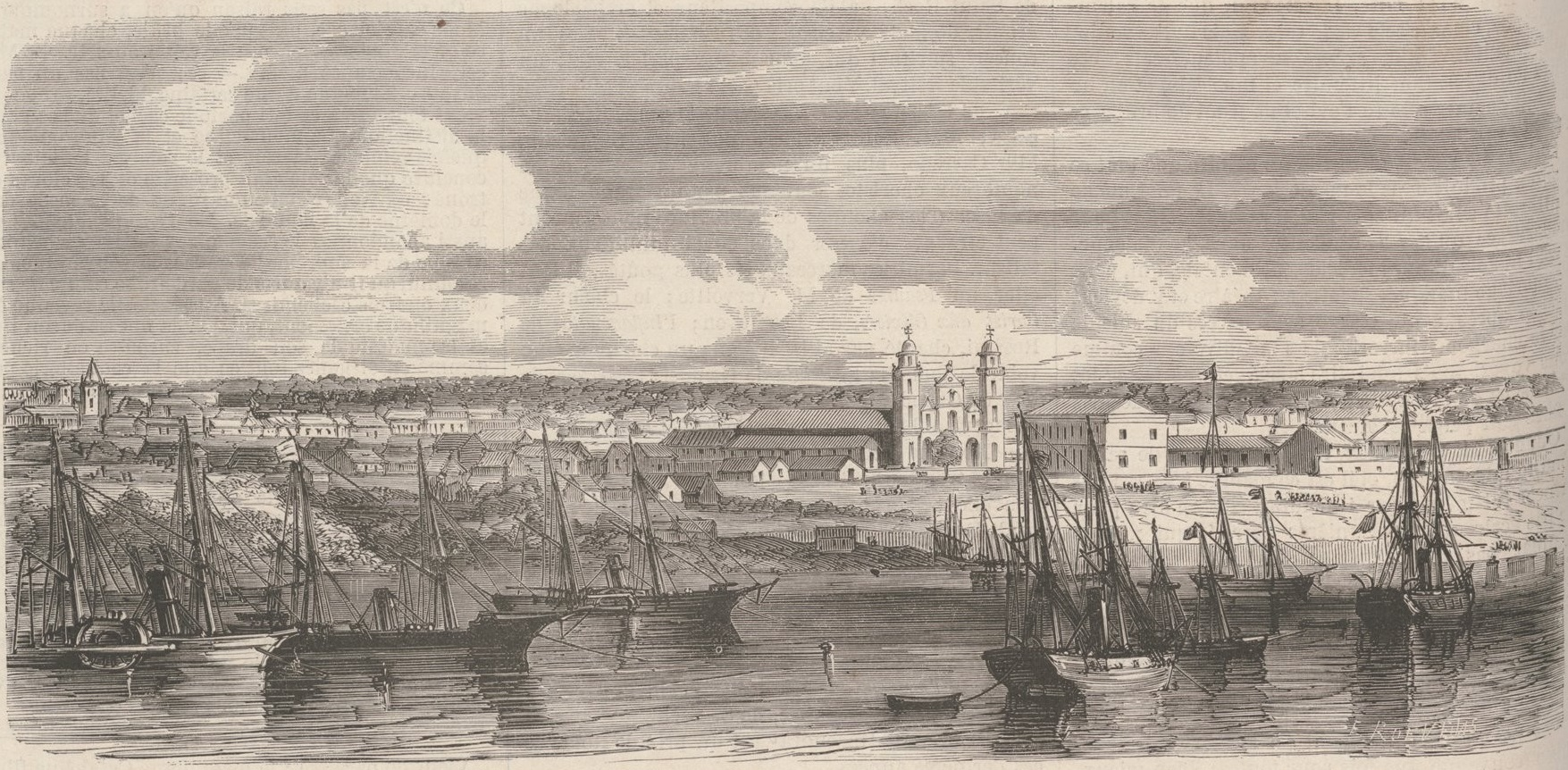
- The city of Asunción occupied by the allied army (Le Monde Illustré: journal hebdomadaire, nº 625, 03/04/1869).
Date	1 January 1869 - 9 March 1870
Location	Asunción, Paraguay
Result	Allied victory: Occupation of the Paraguayan capital and establishment of a new provisional government of Paraguay.

Belligerents
Paraguay	Empire of Brazil; Argentina; Uruguay; Paraguayan Legion

Commanders and leaders
Solano López	Marquis of Caxias; Count of Eu; João de Sousa

Strength
5,000 soldiers	30,000 soldiers 4,000 soldiers 200 soldiers 800 legionaries

The sacking of Asunción was the occupation of the Paraguayan capital carried out as of January 1, 1869 by Brazilian forces in the Triple Alliance led by General João de Souza da Fonseca Costa. Asunción was deserted, evacuated by all its inhabitants two days before. On January 5, Luís Alves de Lima e Silva, then Marquis of Caxias, entered the city with the rest of the army. Most of Caxias' army settled in Asunción, where also 4,000 Argentine and 200 Uruguayan troops soon arrived together with about 800 soldiers and officers of the Paraguayan Legion. By this time Caxias was ill and weary of the war. On January 17 he fainted during a mass, relinquished his command on the 18th and left for Montevideo on the 19th.

The Argentine troops encamped in the outskirts, in Trinidad using its church - executed by Carlos Antonio López and where their rest rested - like stable and latrine.

As soon as the troops entered the city, they began looting all the buildings, beginning with the grand palaces of the aristocratic families of the capital. The furniture of the government ministries, the Palace of Congress, the Lopez family, were also looted; The furniture of the National Club, bought in Europe shortly before the War; The furniture of the house of Marshal Francisco Solano López and the residence of his wife, Eliza Lynch. The first places to be visited were the National Club and the residences of the President, his wife and his brothers Venancio and Benigno and Inocencia, full of fine furniture, signature paintings, carpets, Venetian mirrors, pianos and silver and gold dinnerware.

Through the streets were rows of objects and furniture waiting to be loaded on ships bound for Buenos Aires and Rio de Janeiro; When sailing, the boats were loaded to the top loaded with objects looted in Asunción. In the 1970s, Argentina returned the "trophies of war" captured during the war, and Uruguay had already done so in the 1880s, but most of the looting in the capital could never be recovered.

Asunción remained occupied by Brazilian troops until 1876.

== Provisional government ==
With Solano López on the run, the country lacked a government. Emperor Pedro II of Brazil sent his Foreign minister José Paranhos to Asunción where he arrived on February 20, 1869 and began consultations with the local politicians. Paranhos had to create a provisional government which could sign a peace accord and recognize the border claimed by Brazil between the two nations. According to historian Francisco Doratioto, Paranhos, "the then-greatest Brazilian specialist on Platine affairs", had a "decisive" role in the installation of the Paraguayan provisional government.

With Paraguay devastated, the power vacuum resulting from Solano López's overthrow was quickly filled by emerging domestic factions which Paranhos had to accommodate. On March 31 a petition was signed by 335 leading citizens asking Allies for a Provisional government. This was followed by negotiations between the Allied countries who put aside some of more controversial points of the Treaty of the Triple Alliance and on June 11 an agreement was reached with Paraguayan opposition figures that a three-man Provisional government will be established. On July 22, a National Assembly met in the National Theatre and elected Junta Nacional of 21 men which then selected a five-man committee to select three men for the Provisional government. They selected Carlos Loizaga, Juan Francisco Decoud, and Jose Diaz de Bedoya. Decoud, being pro-Argentine, was unacceptable to Paranhos, who had him replaced with Cirilo Antonio Rivarola. The government was finally installed on August 15, but was just a front for the continued Allied occupation. After the death of Lopez, the Provisional government issued a proclamation on March 6, 1870 in which it promised to support political liberties, to protect commerce and to promote immigration.

The Provisional government did not last. In May 1870 José Díaz de Bedoya resigned and on August 31, 1870 Carlos Loizaga also resigned. The remaining member Antonio Rivarola was then relieved of his duties by the National Assembly which established a provisional Presidency to which Facundo Machaín was elected and assumed post on August 31, 1870 but was overthrown the next day in a coup which restored Rivarola to power.

== Paraguayan National Archive ==
In addition to valuables, the "Treasure of War" was not only composed of pieces of gold and silver, but also constituted the historical and cultural heritage illegally exiled.

The Brazilian Minister in Asunción, José da Silva Paranhos, seized part of the National Archives of Paraguay, which, after his death, donated to the National Library of Brazil, the catalog of the Rio Branco collection. The collection consists of fifty thousand documents on the History of Paraguay, issues of boundaries and dates and facts about the history of the River Plate "and was restored and cataloged back to the National Archives of Asunción in the 1980s Some documents (about 800) that were believed Lost were found in the same in the recent catalogs and foliations in detail of the Collection. As of 2016, this is being digitized and uploaded to the Internet by the Archive.

The "Golden Book" offered by the "Paraguayan Ladies" to Marshal López on the anniversary of his birth, on July 24, 1867, was discovered by chance in a showcase of the National Historical Museum of Rio de Janeiro. Years later, General Ernesto Geisel, then President of Brazil, solemnly returned the "Golden Book" to the Republic of Paraguay.

The valuable material had been apprehended in the combat of Piribebuy, in 1868, one of Solano López's headquarters in his retreat towards the "Cordilleras". The 50,000 documents are duly cataloged in the "Vizconde Collection of Rio Branco" in 5122 indexes, some containing dozens of manuscripts. The archival documents also contain evidence of the colonization of Paraguay, struggles for independence, religious and indigenous issues, border demarcation, navigation problems, private correspondence between ministers of state and ambassadors, Word, eminently Paraguayan matters, such as dictates, decrees and laws of several governments, including dictator Francia, protest manifests against King Ferdinand VII of Spain, agreements with Argentina, Uruguay and Brazil, trade agreements, etc.

In 1871, the file was refounded by means of a decree of the Triumvirate of government.

== Bibliography ==
- Doratioto, Francisco (2003). Maldita guerra: nova história da Guerra do Paraguai. Companhia das Letras. ISBN 978-85-359-0224-2.
