= Manorá =

Neighbourhood in Asunción, Paraguay

Coordinates: 25°17′S 57°34′W

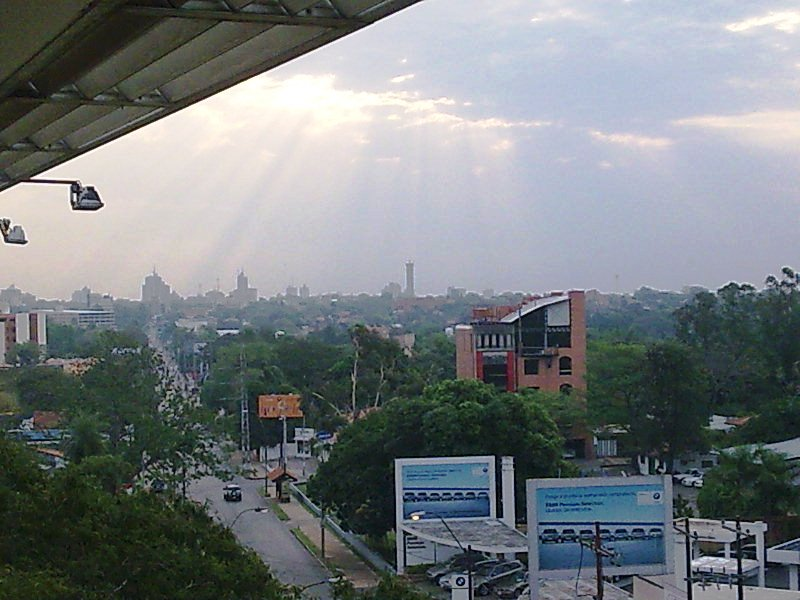
España Ave. from Manora Condo complex balcony

Manorá (or Manó Râ) is a barrio (neighbourhood) of Asunción, the capital of Paraguay. It has a population of 1,898 people.

== Geography ==
Manorá is bordered near Santo Domingo, Las Lomas, San Jorge, Ycua Sati, San Cristobal, and Villa Morra.

== Toponymy ==
The name is believed to have been coined by Roa Bastos in 1993. The name is Guarani for "a place of death". It could also possibly interpreted as "a place of dying", or "a place of the dead".

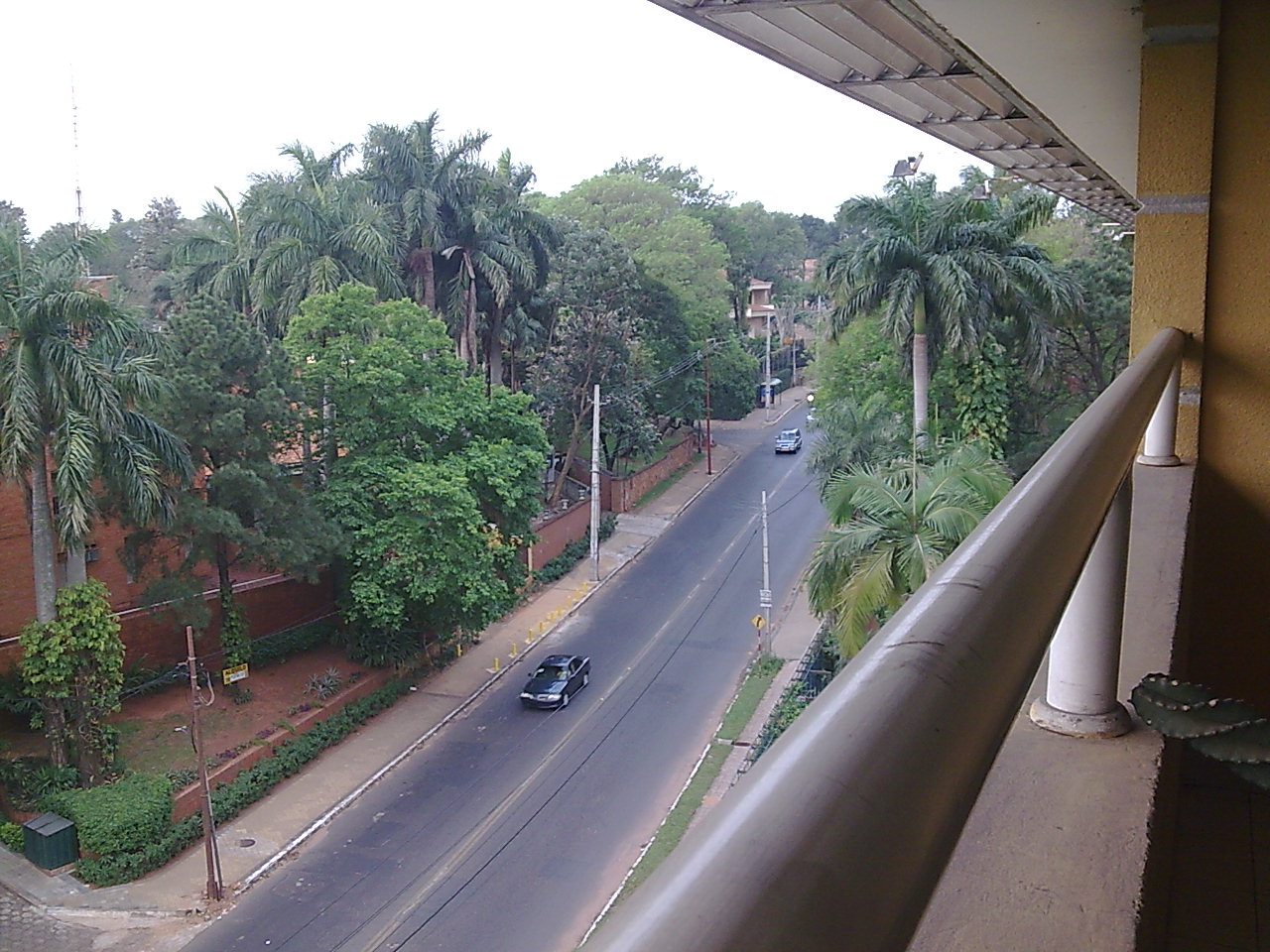
España Ave. other side

== Notable people ==
- Emilio Gill - Brother of and member of the cabinet of Juan Bautista Gill (assassinated in 1877 in Manorá).
- Carlos Antonio López - president of Paraguay (born November 4, 1792, in Manorá).
- Francisco Solano López - president of Paraguay (born 1827 in Manorá).
