= Francisco Solano López =

President of Paraguay from 1862 to 1870

Marshal of Paraguay Francisco Solano López
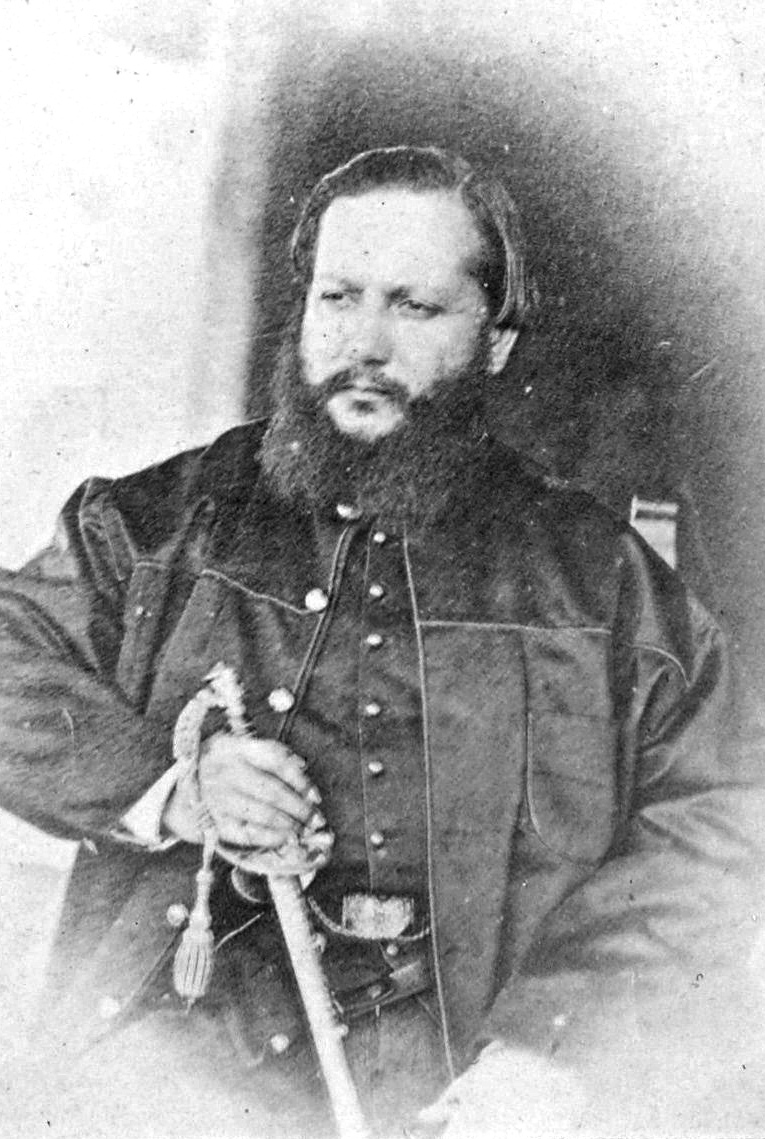
- López, c. 1870

2nd President of Paraguay
- In office 10 September 1862 – 1 March 1870
- Vice President: Domingo Francisco Sánchez
- Preceded by: Carlos Antonio López
- Succeeded by: Paraguayan Triumvirate (Cirilo Antonio Rivarola, José Díaz de Bedoya and Carlos Loizaga)

Personal details
- Born: 24 July 1827 Asunción, Paraguay
- Died: 1 March 1870 (aged 42) Cerro Corá, Paraguay
- Resting place: National Pantheon of the Heroes
- Spouse: Eliza Alicia Lynch
- Parents: Carlos Antonio López (father); Juana Pabla Carrillo (mother)
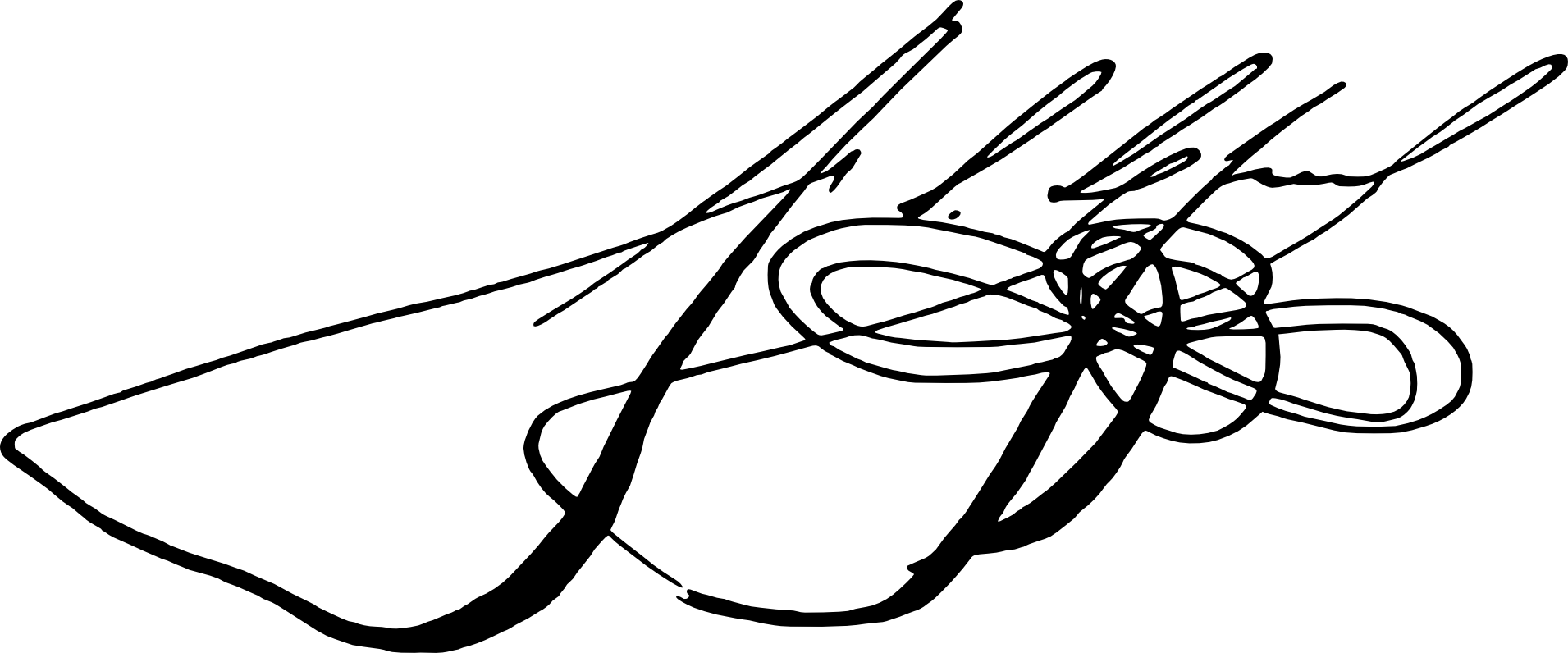
- Signature

Military service
- Allegiance: Paraguay
- Branch/service: Paraguayan Army
- Years of service: 1844–1870
- Rank: Brigadier General (1845–1862); Divisional general (1862–1865); Marshal-President of the Paraguayan Armies (1865–1870)
- Commands: Commander of the Paraguayan Expeditionary Force in Corrientes (1845–1846); Commander of the Paraguayan Expeditionary Force in Misiones (1848–1852); Commander in Chief of the Paraguayan Army in the Paraguayan War (1864–1870)
- Battles/wars: Platine Wars; Against Rosas (1845–1852); Crimean War; As attaché militaire in the French Army (1854); Paraguayan War; Mato Grosso campaign; Capture of the steamer Marquês de Olinda; Humaitá campaign; Battle of Yataytí Corá; Passage of Curupayty (1867); Siege of Humaitá; Passage of Curupayty (1868); Pikysyry campaign; Pikysyry maneuver; Battle of Lomas Valentinas; Sacking of Asunción; Campaign of the Hills; Manduvirá River Expeditions; Battle of Cerro Corá †
- Awards: Commander of the Imperial Order of Christ of Brazil; Commander of the Legion of Honour of France; Commander of the Order of Saints Maurice and Lazarus; Knight of the Supreme Order of Christ of the Holy See; Grand Cross of the National Order of Merit of Paraguay

Francisco Solano López Carrillo (24 July 1827 or 1826 – 1 March 1870) was a Paraguayan statesman, military officer and politician who served as President of Paraguay from 1862 to 1870, of which he served mostly during the Paraguayan War (1864–1870). He is the only Paraguayan president to have been killed in action.

At a very young age, he served in the Paraguayan Army fighting against Juan Manuel de Rosas in the sporadic hostilities sustained by Paraguay and Argentina during the Platine Wars. After the downfall of Rosas, he became Ambassador of Paraguay, as Minister Plenipotentiary, in several European countries from 1853 to 1855. At his return to Asunción, he was appointed Vice-President of the Supreme Government of his father Carlos Antonio López, and then assumed the presidency when his father died. He is one of only two Paraguayans to have received the rank of Marshal, along with José Félix Estigarribia.

He is one of the most controversial figures in South American history, particularly because of the Paraguayan War, known in the Plate Basin as "the War of the Triple Alliance" (Spanish: la Guerra de la Triple Alianza). At least 50% of Paraguayans died during the war, numbers which made the country's recovery take decades.

From one perspective, his ambitions were the main reason for the outbreak of the war while other arguments maintain he was a fierce champion of the independence of South American nations against foreign rule and interests. He was killed in action during the Battle of Cerro Corá, which marked the end of the war and of the dictatorship. He is officially recognized as the country's national hero since the presidency of Colonel Rafael Franco between 1936 and 1937 after decades of liberal governments that rejected his figure as heroic. The date of his birth, July 24, is officially recognized as the Paraguayan Army Day, while the date of his death, March 1, is officially recognized as the National Heroes' Day and is a national holiday in the country.

== Life and career ==
=== Life before the war ===
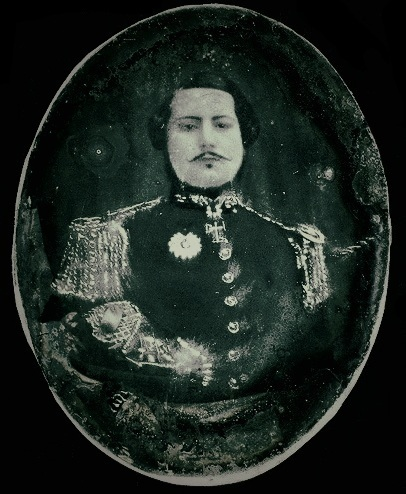
Solano López around age 27, c.1854

Solano López was born in Manorá, a barrio of Asunción in 1827, or according to other sources, 1826. His father, Carlos Antonio López, ascended to the Paraguayan Presidency in 1841 following the death of the nation's longtime dictator, José Gaspar Rodríguez de Francia. The elder López would commission his son as a brigadier general in the Paraguayan Army, at the age of 17, in 1844. During the Argentine Civil Wars, Solano López was appointed commander-in-chief of Paraguayan forces stationed along the Argentine frontier. He pursued his early military studies in Rio de Janeiro and Asunción, specializing in fortifications and artillery.

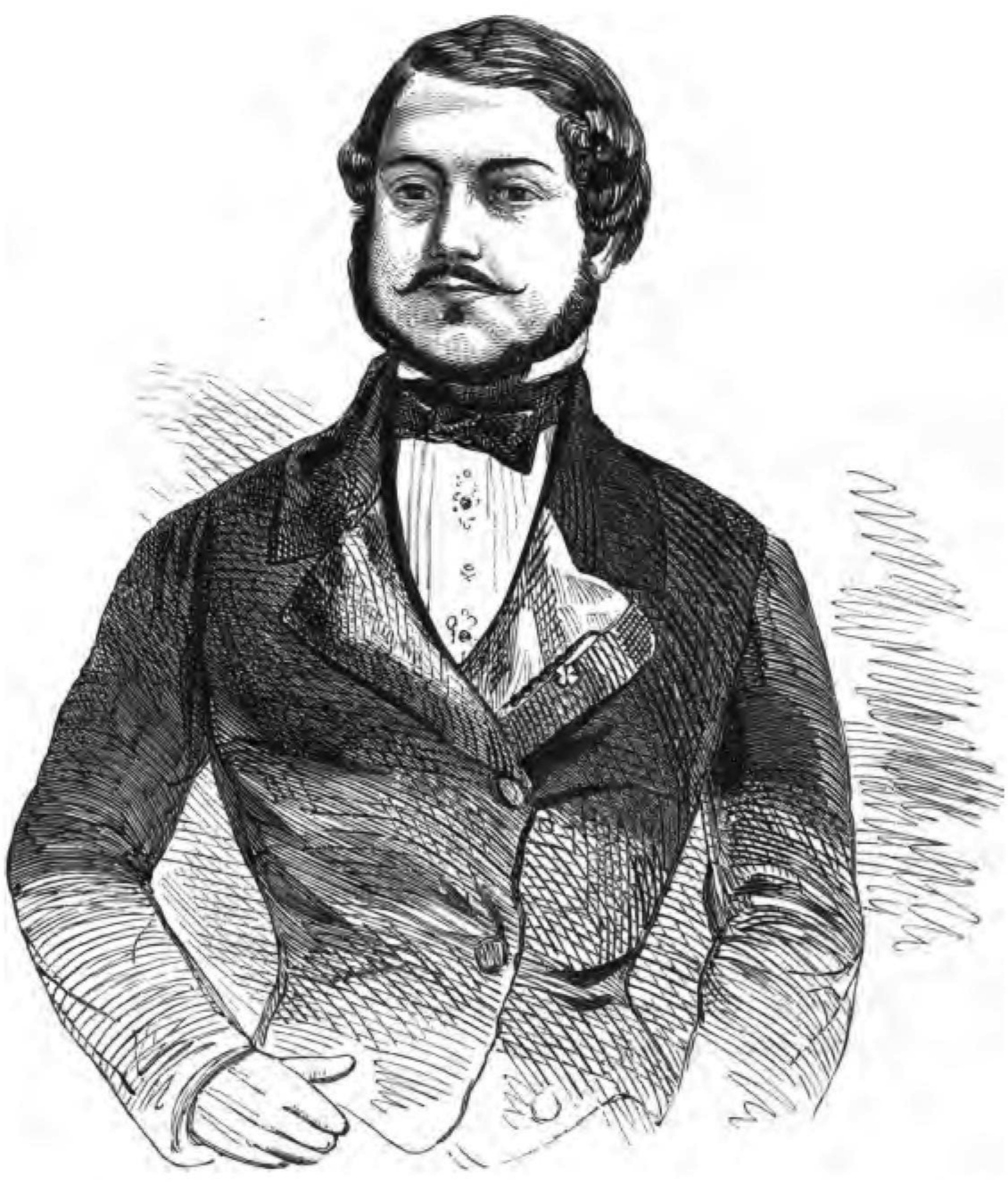
Brigadier General Francisco Solano López, envoy extraordinary and minister plenipotentiary of the Republic of Paraguay

Solano López was dispatched to Europe in 1853 as minister plenipotentiary to Britain, France, and the Kingdom of Sardinia. López went on to spend over a year and a half in Europe, most of it in Paris. He purchased large quantities of arms and military supplies, together with several steamers, on behalf of the Paraguayan military. He also modernized the Paraguayan Army with the novelties he acquired in Europe, adopting the French Code and the Prussian System of military organization (receiving some praise for this innovation many years later). His diplomatic work also included organizing a project to build a new railroad and efforts to establish a French émigré colony in Paraguay. He installed the first electric telegraph in South America. López also became a great admirer of the Second French Empire and developed a fascination with Napoleon Bonaparte. López later equipped his army with uniforms designed to match those of the Grande Armée and it was said that he also ordered for himself an exact replica of Napoleon's crown, yet this remains unproven.

It was also during his time in France that Solano López met a Parisian courtesan, the Irish-born Eliza Lynch, and brought her with him back to Paraguay. There she was his concubine and de facto first lady till his death.

Solano López returned from Europe in 1855 and his father appointed him Minister of War. He was elevated to the office of Vice President of Paraguay in 1862.

In November 1859, López was on board the Paraguayan steamer Tacuari, which was captured by Royal Navy ships attempting to pressure his father into releasing a British citizen from prison. The British consul who ordered the action was Sir William Dougal Christie, who had been replaced by Edward Thornton, who adopted a far less aggressive tone compared to Christie.

With his father's death in 1862, López convened the Congress of Paraguay, and was unanimously proclaimed President of Paraguay for a term of ten years.

== Presidency ==
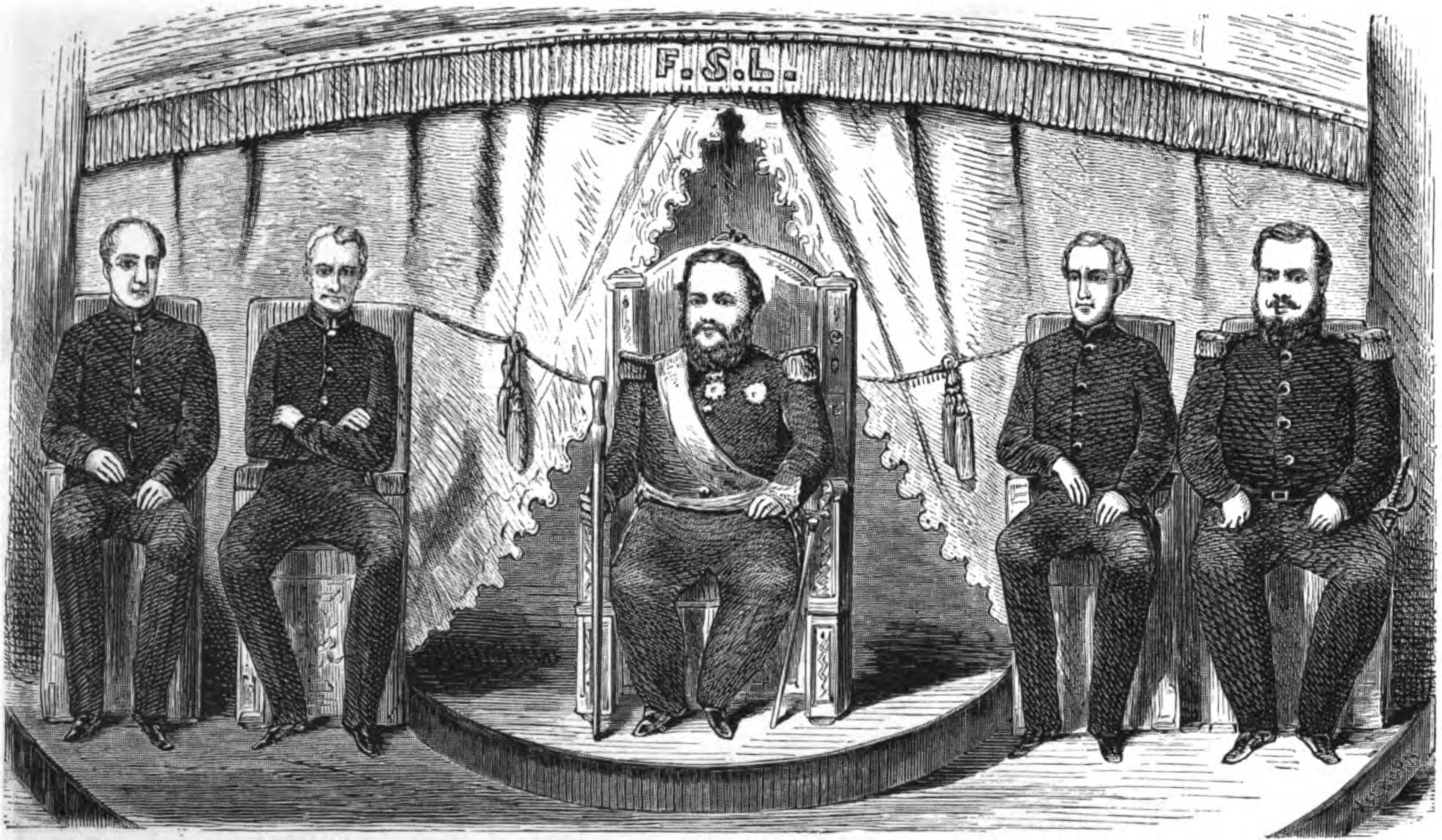
The Throne: López and his Cabinet

After taking office, López opted to continue most of the policies of economic protectionism and internal development adopted by his predecessors. However, he broke sharply with the traditional policy of strict isolationism in foreign affairs that was favoured by previous Paraguayan leaders. López instead embarked on a more activist approach to international relations. He had, as his great ambition, to position Paraguay as a credible "third force" in the ongoing rivalry between Argentina and the Empire of Brazil over control of the Rio de la Plata Basin.

López wanted Paraguay to compete with the continent's major powers in the struggle for spoils and regional dominance. In pursuit of this goal, López sought to organize the region's smaller nations into a political coalition designed to offset the power and influence of the Brazilians and the Argentines. López found an eager ally in Uruguayan President Bernardo Berro, another leader whose country was frequently menaced by the various intrigues of the continent's two great powers. Berro and López quickly concluded an alliance, and López began a massive expansion and reorganization of the Paraguayan military, introducing mandatory military service for all men along with other reforms.

Under López, Paraguay grew to possess one of the best-trained, but most ill-equipped, militaries in the region. He bought new weapons from France and England but they failed to arrive because of the blockade imposed by the allies when the war broke out.

=== Role in beginning the war ===
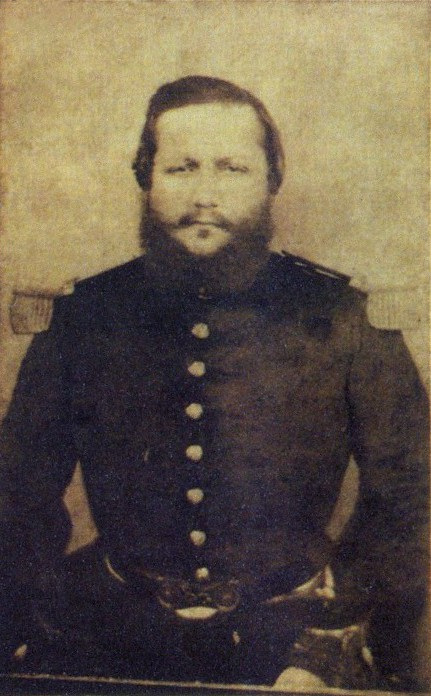
The last known picture of Solano López, taken by photographer Domenico Parodi, c. 1870.

In 1863, the Empire of Brazil—which did not have friendly relations with Paraguay—began providing military and political support to an incipient rebellion in Uruguay led by Venancio Flores and his Colorado Party against the fusionist Colorado and Blanco Party government of Bernardo Berro (of the Blanco Party) and his successor, Atanasio Aguirre. The besieged Uruguayans repeatedly asked for military assistance from their Paraguayan allies against the Brazilian-backed rebels. López manifested his support for Aguirre's government via a letter to Brazil, in which he said that any occupation of Uruguayan lands by Brazil would be considered an attack on Paraguay.

When Brazil did not heed the letter and invaded Uruguay on 12 October 1864, López seized the Brazilian merchant steamer Marqués de Olinda in the harbour of Asunción, and imprisoned the Brazilian governor of the province of Mato Grosso, who was on board. In the following month (December 1864) López formally declared war on Brazil and dispatched a force to invade Mato Grosso. The force seized and sacked the town of Corumbá and took possession of the province and its diamond mines, together with an immense quantity of arms and ammunition, including enough gunpowder to last the whole Paraguayan Army for at least a year of active war. However, Paraguayan forces could not or would not seize the capital city of Cuiabá, in northern Mato Grosso.

López next intended to send troops to Uruguay to support the government of Atanasio Aguirre, yet when he requested permission from Argentina to cross onto its soil, President Bartolomé Mitre refused to allow the Paraguayan force to cross the intervening province of Corrientes. By this time the Brazilians had managed to successfully topple Aguirre and install their ally Venancio Flores as president, rendering Uruguay little more than a Brazilian puppet state.

The Paraguayan Congress, summoned by López, bestowed him the title of "Marshal-President" of the Paraguayan Armies (an equivalent of Grand Marshal, he was the only Paraguayan who gained that rank in his own lifetime) and gave him extraordinary war powers. On 13 April 1865, he declared war on Argentina, seizing two Argentine war vessels in the Bay of Corrientes. The next day, he occupied the town of Corrientes, instituted a provisional government of his Argentine partisans, and announced that Paraguay had annexed Corrientes Province and Argentina's Entre Ríos Province.

On 1 May 1865, Brazil joined Argentina and Uruguay in signing the Treaty of the Triple Alliance, which stipulated that they should unitedly pursue war with Paraguay until the existing government of Paraguay was overthrown and "until no arms or elements of war should be left to it". This agreement was literally carried out. This treaty also stipulated that more than half of the Paraguayan territories would be conquered by the Allies after the war. The treaty, when made public, caused international outrage and voices rose in favour of Paraguay.

=== War of the Triple Alliance ===
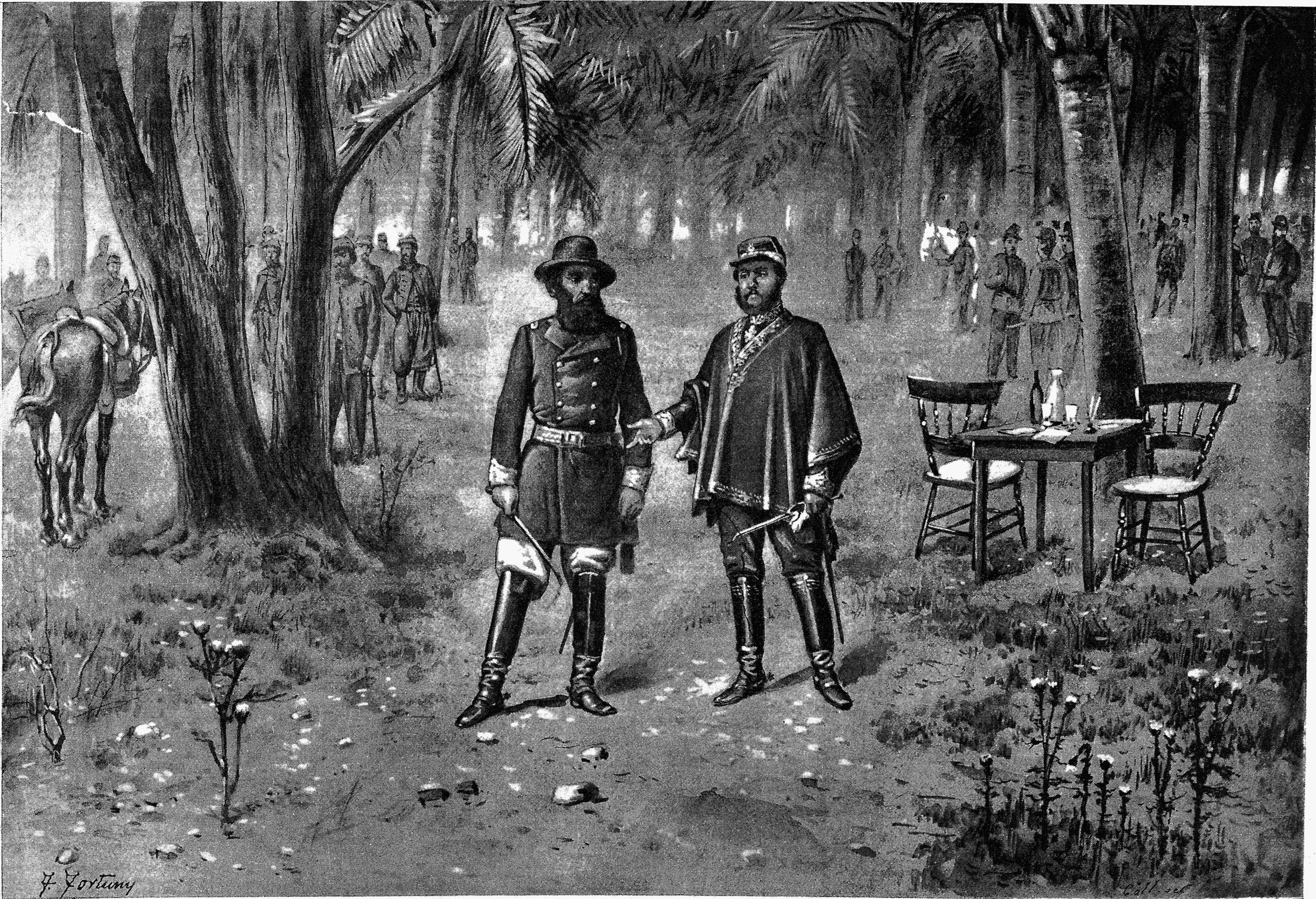
Conference in Yatayty Corá.

The war which ensued, lasting until 1 March 1870, was carried on with great stubbornness and with alternating fortunes, though López's disasters steadily increased. His first major setback came on 11 June 1865, when the powerless Paraguayan fleet was destroyed by the Brazilian Navy at the Battle of Riachuelo, which gave the Allies control over the various waterways surrounding Paraguay and forced López to withdraw from Argentina.

On 12 September 1866, López invited Mitre to a conference in Yataytí Corá. López believed that the time was right to treat for peace and was ready to sign a peace treaty with the Allies. No agreement was reached though since Mitre's conditions were that every article of the Treaty of the Triple Alliance was still to be carried out, a condition which López refused. Regardless of López's refusal, a peace treaty was not something Mitre could guarantee except on the terms of article VI of the treaty which stated that "The allies pledge themselves solemnly not to lay down their arms unless by common accord, nor until they have overthrown the present Government of Paraguay, nor to treat with the enemy separately, nor sign any Treaty of peace, truce, armistice, or Convention whatsoever for putting an end or suspending the war, unless by a perfect agreement of all".

In 1868, when the allies were pressing him hard, he convinced himself that his Paraguayan supporters had actually formed a conspiracy against his life. Thereupon, several hundred prominent Paraguayan citizens were seized and executed by his order, including his brothers and brothers-in-law, cabinet ministers, judges, prefects, military officers, bishops and priests, and nine-tenths of the civil officers, together with more than two hundred foreigners, among them several members of the diplomatic legations (the San Fernando massacre). During this time, he also had his 70-year-old mother flogged and ordered her execution because she revealed to him that he had been born out of wedlock.

Ramona Martínez, who worked as a nurse in the war, had been enslaved by López; for her fighting and rallying of soldiers, she was nicknamed "the American Joan of Arc".

==== Battle of Cerro Corá ====
Allied troops captured the Paraguayan capital city of Asunción on 1 January 1869, forcing López and what remained of his army and government to flee to the countryside. By late 1869, López was at last driven with a handful of troops to the northern frontier of Paraguay. He arrived at Cerro Corá on 14 February 1870. Two detachments were sent in pursuit of Solano López, who was accompanied by 200 men in the forests in the north, where he received news of the considerable Brazilian forces that were closing in on him. This caused some of the officials who were still with López to abandon him and approach the allied force, under the command of the Brazilian General José Antônio Correia da Câmara, which they readily joined as scouts in order to lead them to López.

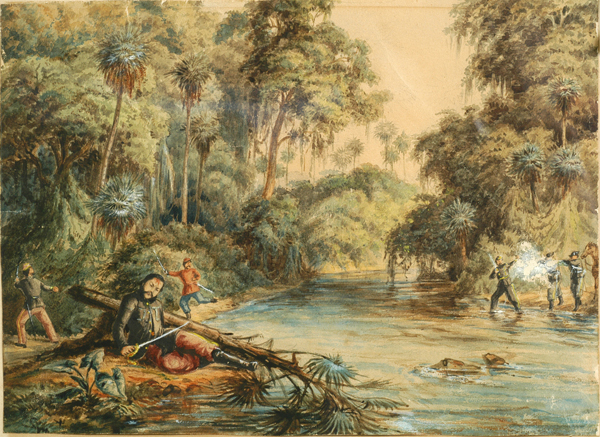
Death of Francisco Solano López

Upon hearing about this, López called a last war council with the remaining officers of his general staff in order to decide the course of action for the upcoming battle: whether they should escape into the rainforest hill range or stay and make a stand against the attackers. The council decided to stay and end the war once and for all by fighting to the death.

The Brazilian force reached the camp on 1 March. During the battle that ensued, López was separated from the remainder of his army and was accompanied by only his aide and a couple of officers. He had been wounded with a spear in the stomach and hit with a sword in the side of his head and so was too weak to walk by himself. They led him to the Aquidabangui stream, and there they left him on the pretext of getting reinforcements.

While López was alone with his aide, General Câmara arrived along with six soldiers and approached him, calling on him to surrender and guaranteeing his life. López refused and shouting ¡Muero con mi patria!, ("I die with my nation!"), tried to attack Câmara with his sword. Câmara ordered him to be disarmed, but López died during the struggle with the soldiers who were trying to disarm him. This incident marked the end of the war of the Triple Alliance.

== Legacy ==
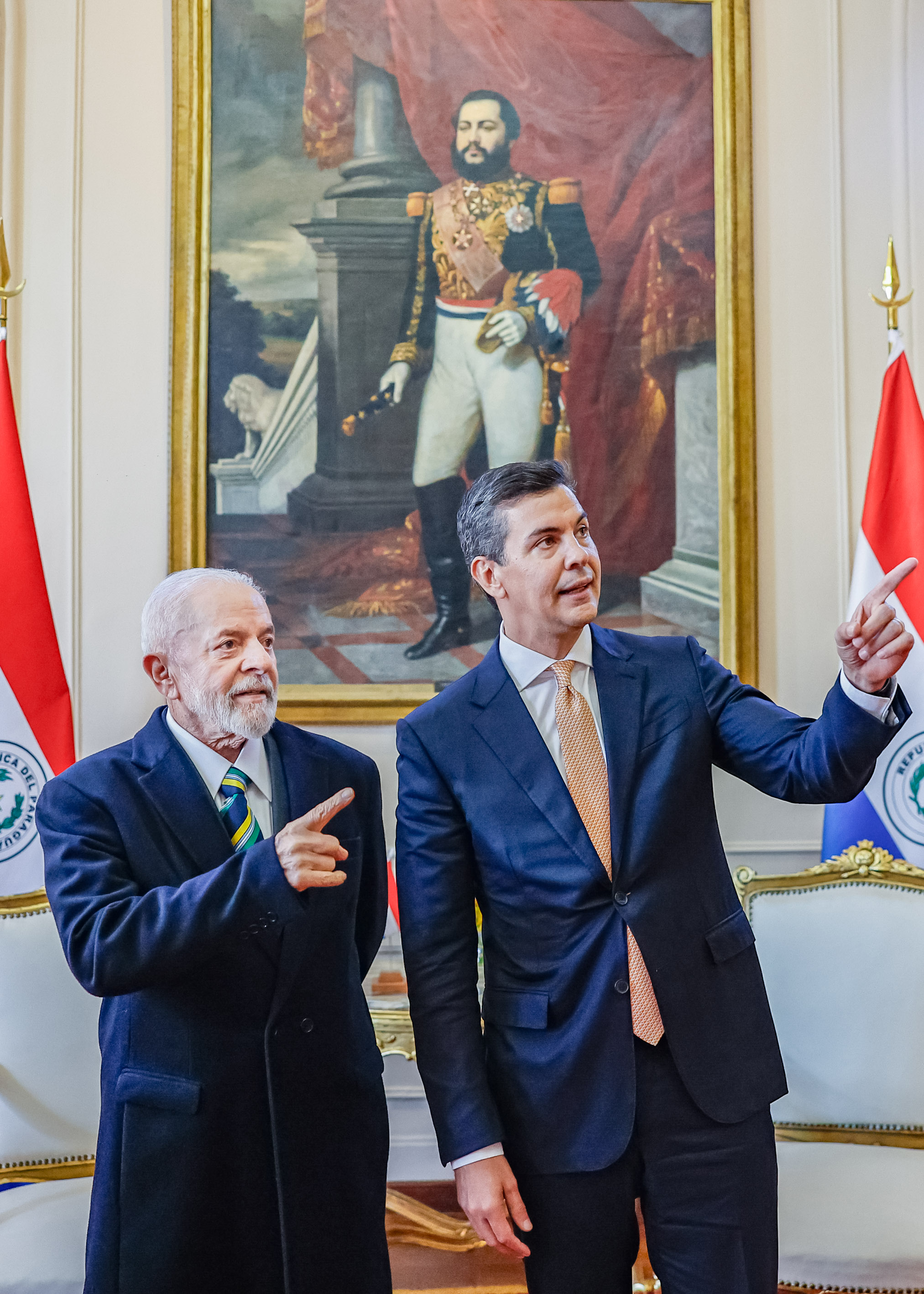
Luiz Inácio Lula da Silva and Santiago Peña in front of a portrait of Solano López, July 2024

During the War of the Triple Alliance, Paraguay lost 25–33% of its territory to Argentina and Brazil. The worst consequence of the war was the catastrophic loss of population. At least 50% of Paraguayans died during the conflict, numbers to which it took many decades for the country to return. Of the disaster suffered by the Paraguayans at the outcome of the war, William D. Rubinstein wrote: "The normal estimate is that of a Paraguayan population of somewhere between 450,000 and 900,000, only 220,000 survived the war, of whom only 28,000 were adult males."

There is a debate within Paraguay as to whether he was a fearless leader who led his troops to the end or whether he foolishly led Paraguay into a war that it could never win and nearly eliminated the country from the map. The debate was not helped by the revisionist stance taken by the Stroessner regime on national history.

Conversely, he is considered by some Latin Americans as a champion for the rights of smaller nations against the imperialism of more powerful neighbours. For example, Eduardo Galeano argues that he and his father continued the work of José Gaspar Rodríguez de Francia in defending Paraguay as "the only country that foreign capital had not deformed".

There is an ongoing debate in Paraguay among historians on López's final words. The two versions are "Muero por mi patria" ("I die for my nation") or "Muero con mi patria" ("I die with my nation"). (The latter may have been based on the testament of Luís de Camões.) In any case, Juan Silvano Godoi wrote on the event:

Marshal López died profoundly convinced that, along with him, the independence of Paraguay would disappear. He acquired this conviction upon learning that the allies had organized in Asunción a "temporary government" made up of the Paraguayans who had taken arms against their government and fought for the Triple Alliance army.

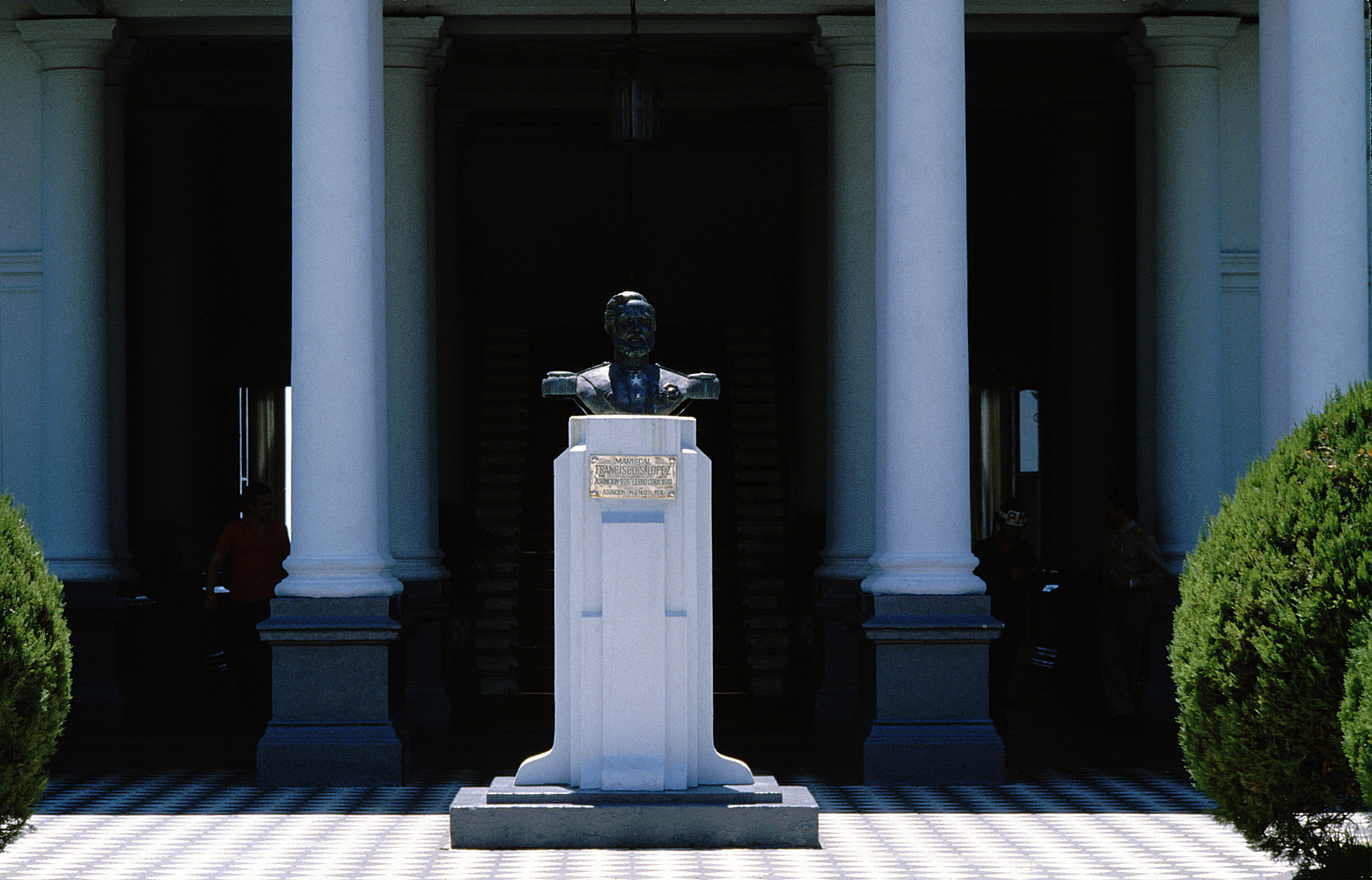
A bust of Solano López in Asunción

On 1 March, a national holiday in Paraguay, "Día de los Héroes" (Heroes' Day) is held in honour of López's memory. It is the most important holiday in the country after Independence Day. López is still considered to be the greatest Paraguayan national hero, and his remains are located at the National Pantheon of the Heroes in Asunción. It is customary in Asunción that when something historically worth celebrating happens (such as the victory of the former President Fernando Lugo in the 2008 elections), people flock with their flags to the street in front of the Pantheon and celebrate the event.

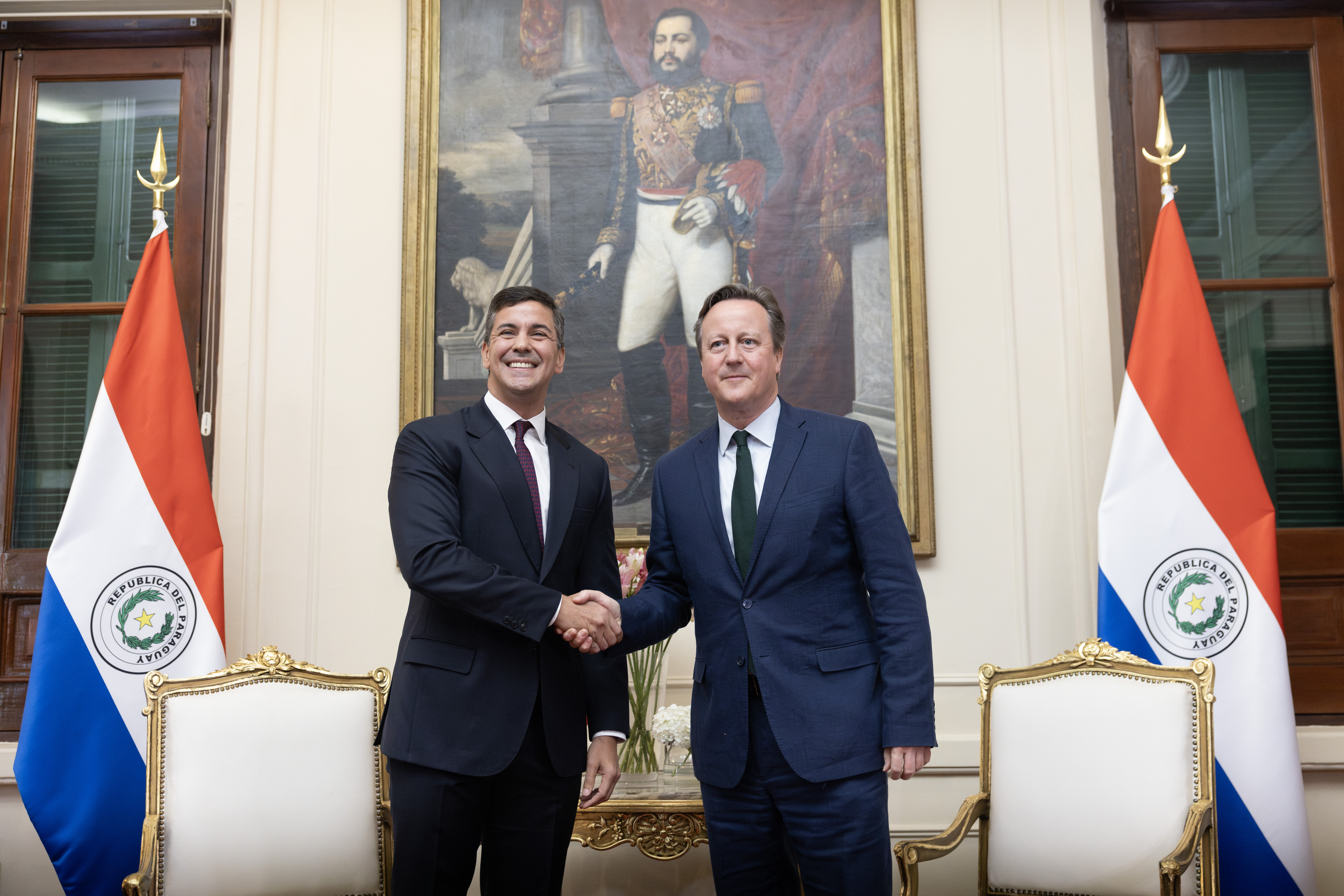
Santiago Peña and David Cameron in front of a portrait of Solano López, February 2024

In 2007, Argentine President Cristina Kirchner named an Argentinean unit, the 2nd Armored Artillery Group, after Marshal Francisco Solano López. During the ceremony, the national anthems of both nations were sung and high-ranking officers of both armies were present. The Chief of the Argentine Army gave a speech at the event in which he stated:

Talking about the Paraguayan Army and the Argentine Army is talking of one and the same thing. Today, in the Argentine army, honored by the visit of Paraguay's Army Commandant, we are working intensely in fulfilling the dream of the fathers of our nation. Of those men who wanted to build a great nation, General José de San Martín and, precisely, Marshal López.

Afterwards, Lieutenant General Bendini said:

Marshal López inspired in his men a spirit and love for their land which made them prefer to die rather than surrender. He is an example of what a leader is, a driver, a man who knows how to reach to his people. I am sure that the men of this artillery group will take to the example of this brave Paraguayan soldier and will be deemed worthy of the name their unit bears.

At the end of the ceremony, the Paraguayan Army Commandant presented the unit with a portrait of López. Commenting, a leader in the Buenos Aires La Nación, a newspaper founded by Bartolomé Mitre, said under the headline "Absurd tribute to a dictator", "Naming a military unit after the dictator who trampled on the [Argentine] flag is as absurd as if France or Poland called one of their regiments 'Adolf Hitler'".

== Sources ==
- Bareiro, R., ed. (2007). Testimonios de la Guerra Grande: Muerte del mariscal López (in Spanish). Vol. 1. Asunción: Servilibro. ISBN 9789995300326.
- Bealer, Lewis W. "Francisco Solano Lopez, 'A Dictator Run Amuck'" (Chapter Twelve, pp. 154–172) in South American Dictators During the First Century of Independence, edited by A. Curtis Wilgus (George Washington University Press, 1937; reissued by Russell & Russell Inc., 1963).
- Bray, A. (1984). Solano López: soldado de la gloria y del infortunio (in Spanish). Asunción: Carlos Schauman. OCLC 842206281.
- Brodsky, Alyn (1976). Madame Lynch & Friend. London: Cassell.
- This article incorporates text from a publication now in the public domain: Chisholm, Hugh, ed. (1911). "Lopez, Carlos Antonio s.v. Francisco Solano Lopez". Encyclopædia Britannica. Vol. 16 (11th ed.). Cambridge University Press. pp. 990–991.
- García, A. (1963). Proceso a los falsificadores de la historia del Paraguay (in Spanish). Buenos Aires: Theoria. OCLC 954516890.
- Graham, R. Cunninghame (1933). Portrait of a Dictator: Francisco Solano López. London: William Heinemann. OCLC 14508060.
- Leuchars, C. (2002). To the Bitter End: Paraguay and the War of the Triple Alliance. Westport: Greenwood. ISBN 9780313323652.
- McMahon, M. (1870a). "Paraguay and Her Enemies". Harper's New Monthly Magazine. Vol. 40, no. 237. pp. 421–429. OCLC 317410260.
- McMahon, M. (1870b). "The War in Paraguay". Harper's New Monthly Magazine. Vol. 40, no. 239. pp. 633–647. OCLC 317410260.
- Munro, D. (1960). The Latin American Republics: A History. New York: Appleton-Century-Crofts. OCLC 593518697.
- Saeger, J. (2007). Francisco Solano López and the Ruination of Paraguay. Lanham: Rowman & Littlefield. ISBN 9780742580565.
- Vasconsellos, V. (1970). Resumen de historia del Paraguay (in Spanish). Asunción: Freitas Bastos. OCLC 253033222.
- Whigham, T. (2018). The Paraguayan War: Causes and Early Conduct. Lincoln: UNP. ISBN 9781552389959.
