= National Pantheon of the Heroes =

Monument in Asunción, Paraguay

Coordinates: 25.2822°S 57.6352°W

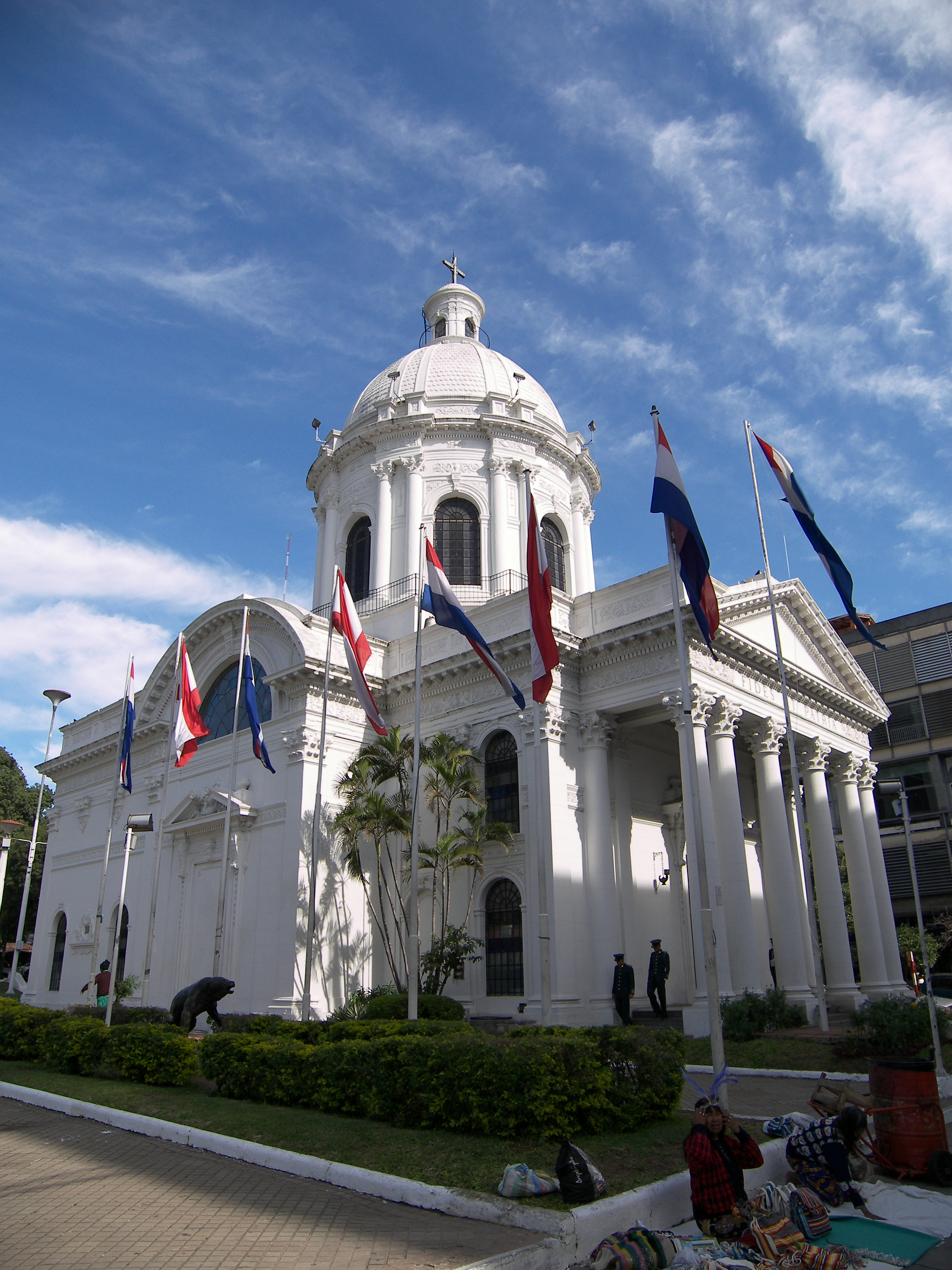
National Pantheon of the Heroes

The National Pantheon of the Heroes (Spanish: Panteón Nacional de los Héroes), whose full name National Pantheon of Heroes and Oratory of the Virgin of the Assumption (Spanish: Panteón Nacional de los Héroes y Oratorio de la Virgen de la Asunción) is a building and landmark of Asunción, Paraguay, and a national monument of Paraguay. Located between Palma and Chile streets in the downtown area of the Paraguayan capital, it is considered of great architectural, artistic and cultural heritage.

In October 1863, the then president Francisco Solano López ordered the construction of a chapel to the Assumption of Mary, which was designed by Italian architect Alejandro Ravizza, in collaboration with the builder Giacomo Colombino. Following the War of the Triple Alliance, the building remained unfinished, surrounded by scaffolding for over 70 years. Only after the Chaco War in 1936 was it completed and inaugurated on October 12 of that year, by presidential decree as the National Pantheon of Heroes.

The National Pantheon is the state mausoleum, where lie the remains of various figures of great significance in Paraguayan history such as Carlos Antonio López (first constitutional president), Francisco Solano López, José Félix Estigarribia (hero of the Chaco War against Bolivia) and his wife. In addition, in the pantheon lie the child martyrs of the Battle of Acosta Ñu and two Unknown Soldiers, among others.

Within the enclosure of the Pantheon are honorary plaques sent by foreign rulers, kings and princes. Examples include offering congratulations and verses of appreciation to the Paraguayan Navy, and Air Force, among others. The front of the pantheon features an inscription in Latin, "Fides et Patria" ("My faith and my country.")

It is customary in Asunción that when something historic happens (such as the victory of Fernando Lugo in the 2008 elections) people flock with flags to the street fronting the Pantheon to celebrate the event.

A ceremonial changing of the guard is held several times a day.

== Gallery ==
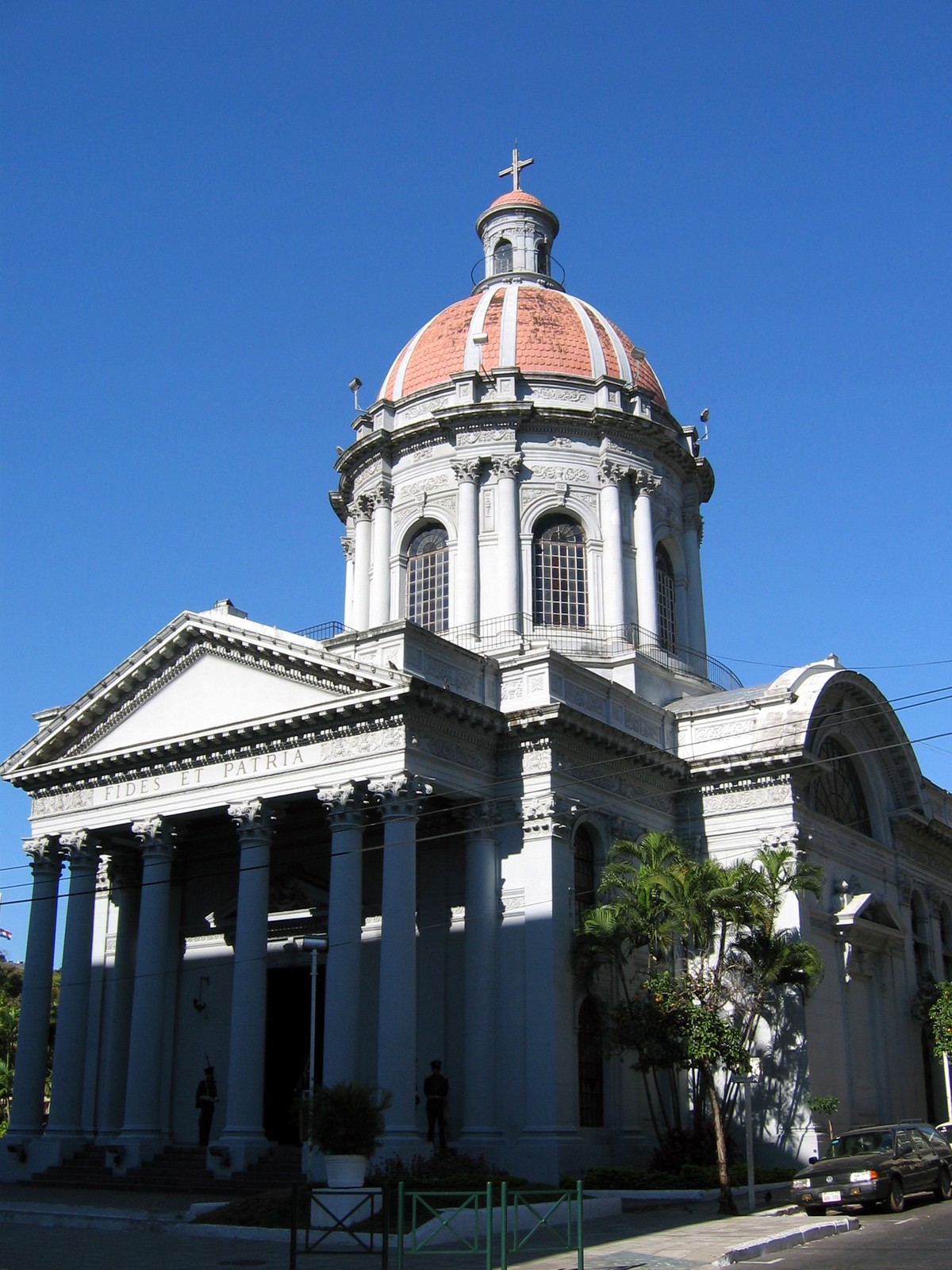
The National Pantheon by day

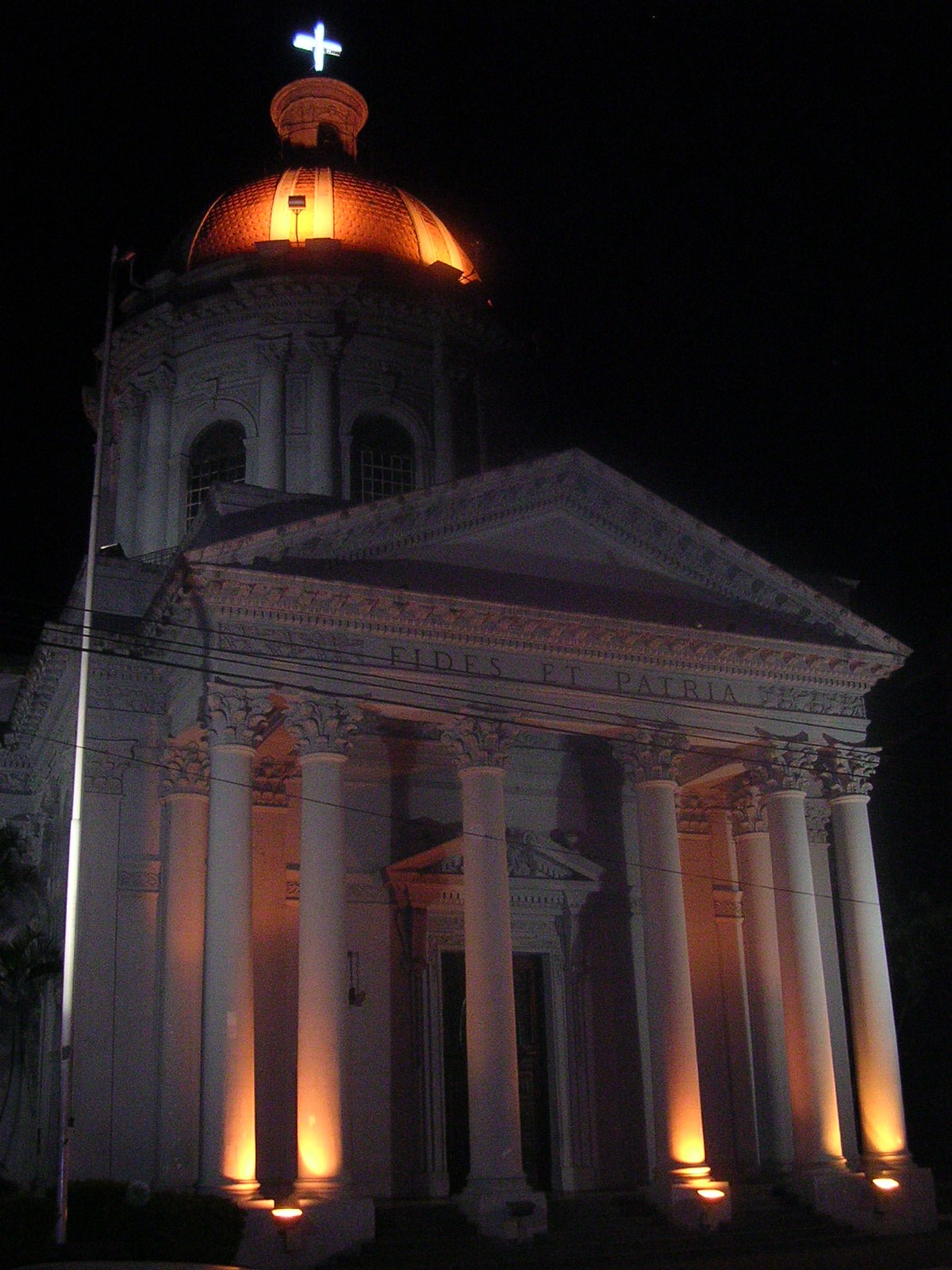
The Pantheon by night

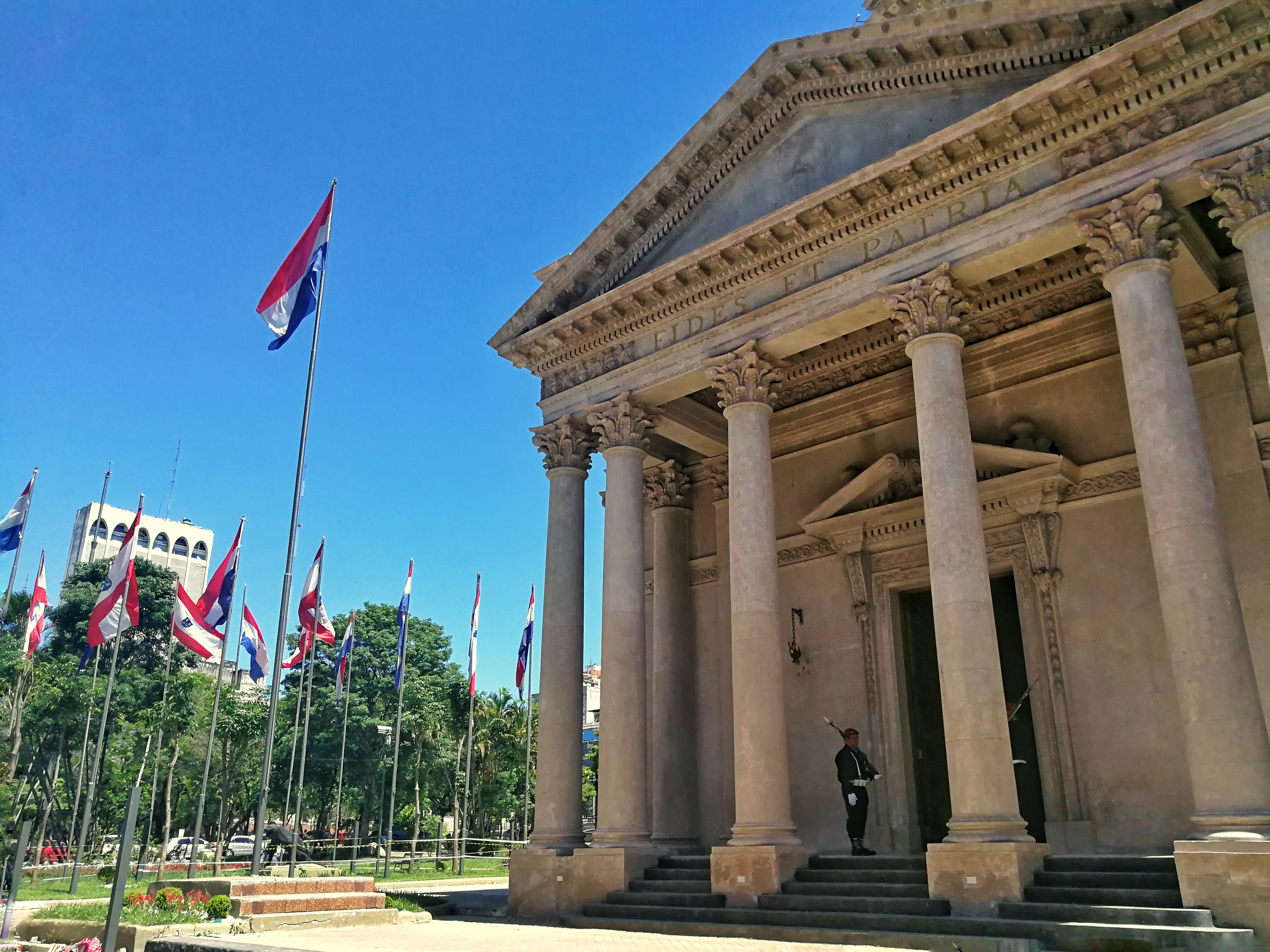
Front of the National Heroes Pantheon by Day
