= Conference of Yataytí Corá =

- Part of the Paraguayan War
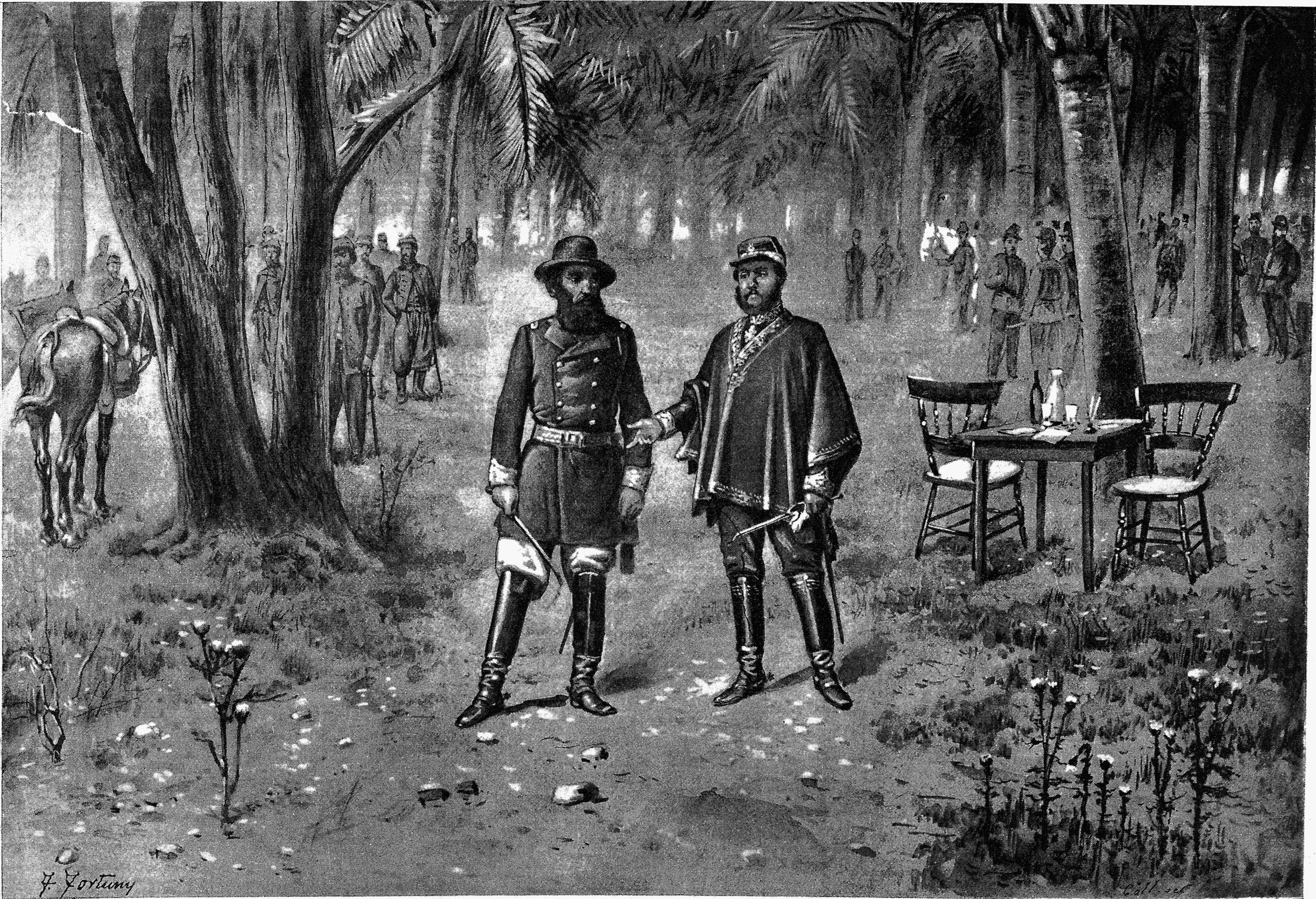
- Lithography depicting the meeting of Argentine president Bartomolé Mitre and Paraguayan president Solano López in Yataytí Corá on 12 September 1866
- Date: 12 September 1866
- Location: Yataytí Corá, Paraguay
- Participants: Bartolomé Mitre; Francisco Solano López; Venancio Flores
- Outcome: The negotiations fail: The Paraguayan War continues for three more years

The Conference of Yataytí Corá, also referred to as the Interview of Yataytí Corá (Spanish: Entrevista de Yataytí Corá), was a meeting that took place on 12 September 1866, in Yataytí Corá, with the purpose of discussing a peace proposal to end the Paraguayan War. The meeting was fruitless due to the absolute opposition of the Empire of Brazil in making peace with Paraguay without unconditional surrender.

== Peace negotiations ==
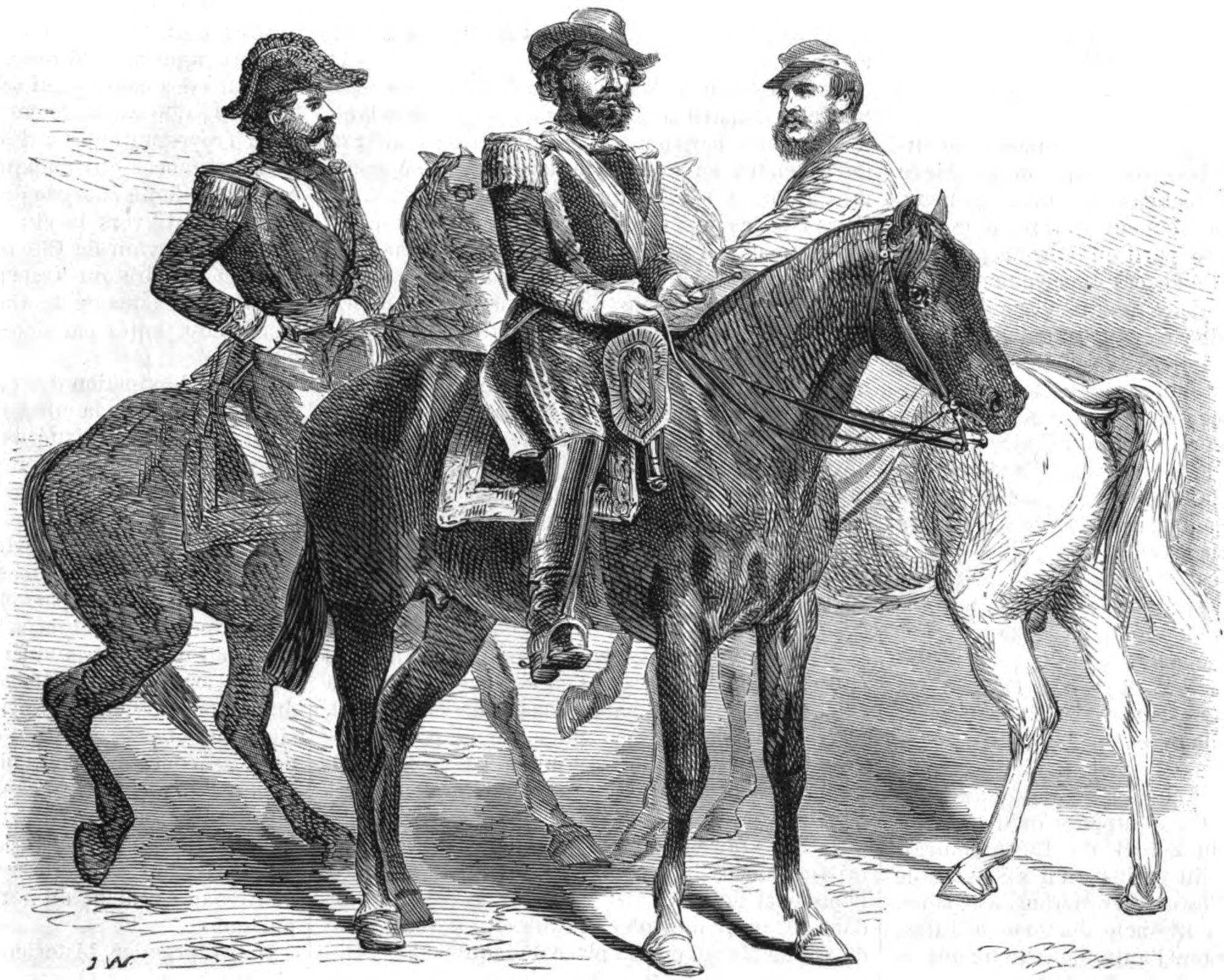
Meeting of generals Flores, Mitre and López (L'Illustration, 1866)

The meeting was proposed by Paraguayan president Francisco Solano López to the leaders of Argentina, Uruguay and the Empire of Brazil with the aim of seeking a peaceful compromise. Brazilian general Polidoro Jordão was invited, but refused the invitation out of respect for the order from the imperial government and his military superiors not to negotiate with the Paraguayan head of state. Uruguayan president Venancio Flores withdrew at the beginning of the conference, after having discussed with Solano López, who had classified him as the responsible for the war, leaving only Argentine president Bartolomé Mitre to represent the Triple Alliance. Such a situation seriously compromised any peace attempt.

During the meeting, López argued that he only entered the war against the Empire of Brazil because he believed that the latter would dominate Uruguay with the intention of threatening others, and that he would have nothing against the Argentine people. He also argued that the Argentines should leave them alone with the Brazilians, who would be easily defeated even if the Brazilians doubled their armies. After 5 hours of meeting, at the behest of López, a protocol of the meeting was drafted in which it was highlighted that the Paraguayan leader aimed to find a conciliatory and honorable solution for both sides. (Note: There is a theory that the Conference of Yataytí Corá was, in fact, a means which López found to gain time in order to complete defensive works, which had been carried out since September 8.) The document informed that Mitre limited himself to listening to the proposal, that any decision would be taken by his government and the other allies, in addition to not offering peace conditions beyond those established by the Treaty of the Triple Alliance. (Note: Article 6 of the Treaty of the Triple Alliance provided the allies to lay down their weapons only when the Paraguayan government was overthrown, in addition to prohibiting any separate peace negotiations with the country.) Some newspapers, such as the Brazilian Jornal do Commercio and the Paraguayan El Semanario published the full document. At this meeting, no agreement was reached for the end of hostilities, and operations in Curupayty were resumed.
