= San Cristóbal (Asunción) =

Coordinates: 25°55′S 55°27′W

- Barrio
- Interactive map of San Cristóbal
- Country: Paraguay
- Autonomous Capital District: Gran Asunción
- City: Asunción

Area
  - Total: 1.42 km^{2} (0.55 sq mi)
- Elevation: 43 m (141 ft)

Population
  - Total: 7,105

San Cristóbal is a neighbourhood (barrio) of Asunción, Paraguay.
