= Platine Wars =

Series of Brazilian conflicts in the 19th century

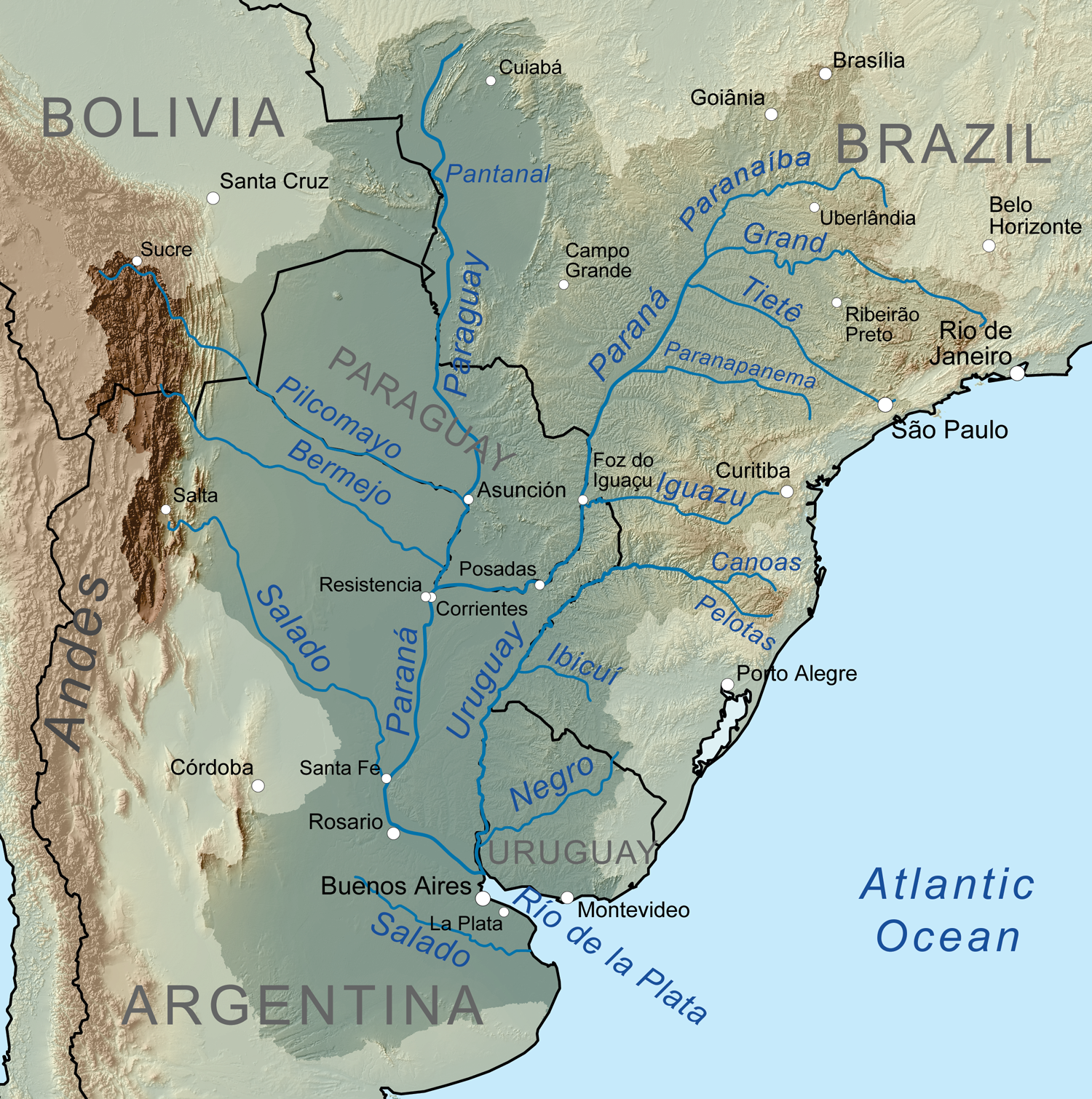
Map of the Río de la Plata Basin

The Platine Wars is a term used by Brazilian historiography to refer to a series of diplomatic and military conflicts along the 19th century between the Empire of Brazil and neighbouring countries in the Río de la Plata Basin.

These conflicts began in 1816, due to the intention of Prince Regent John of annexing the Banda Oriental (modern-day Uruguay) and pushing the Brazilian border to the left bank of the River Plate estuary.

The most notable wars in this period include:

- Portuguese invasion of the Banda Oriental - 1811–1812
- Luso-Brazilian conquest of the Banda Oriental - 1816–1820
- Cisplatine War - 1825–1828
- Uruguayan Civil War - 1839–1851
- Platine War - 1851–1852
- Uruguayan War - 1864–1865
- Paraguayan War - 1864–1870
