= Facundo Machaín =

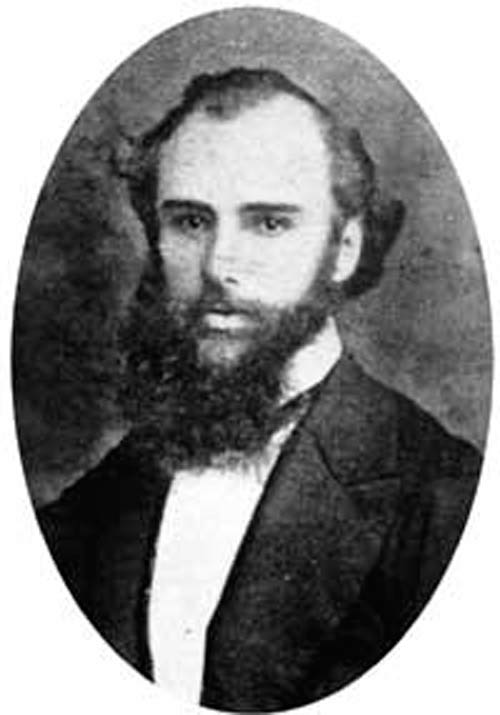
- Machaín, c. 1870

3rd President of Paraguay
- In office August 31, 1870 – September 1, 1870
- Preceded by: Paraguayan Triumvirate (Cirilo Antonio Rivarola, José Díaz de Bedoya and Carlos Loizaga)
- Succeeded by: Cirilo Antonio Rivarola

Personal details
- Born: November 26, 1845 Asunción, Paraguay
- Died: October 29, 1877 (aged 31) Asunción, Paraguay
- Parent: Serapio José de Machaín Recalde (father) Clara Recalde Machaín (mother)

Portrait of Facundo's father, Serapio

Facundo Machaín (November 26, 1845 – October 29, 1877) was president of Paraguay. His period of government lasted barely one day between August 31 and September 1, 1870, but was important for the political situation and development of the country at the time.

== Early life ==
Facundo Machaín Recalde was a lawyer and politician. He was born in Asunción on November 26, 1845. His parents were José Serapio Machaín y Zavala and Clara Recalde y Machaín. He had several siblings: Esteban, León, Raymundo (who later married his widow), Josefa (married Federico Zorraquín), Francisca (married Alberto Robinson), Emilia and Serapio Machaín. He was married to Clara Recalde, but had no children.

After attending school in Asuncion he studied in Chile's Universidad Central where he graduated from Law School. His professor was the Argentine Andrés Bello.

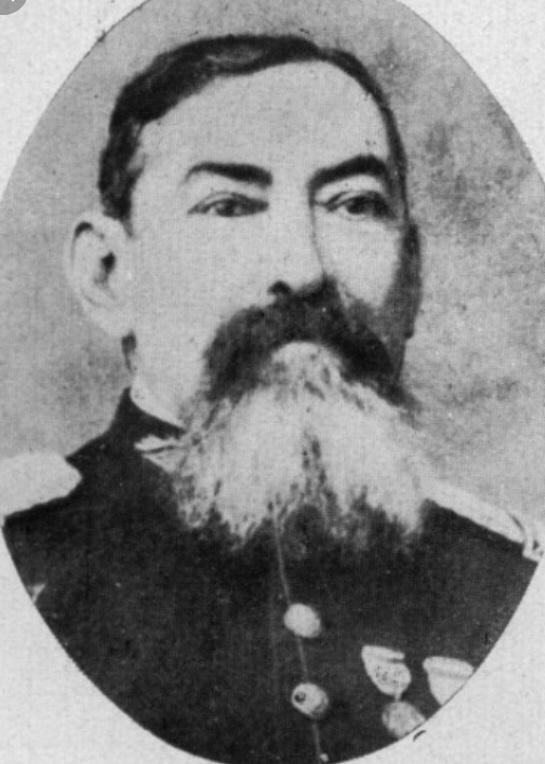
Portrait of Facundo's maternal grandfather, José Recalde Yrunciaga, Councilor of Asunción

== Politics ==
At the end of Paraguayan War in early 1869 he returned to the recently occupied Asuncion and got involved in politics. He quickly became president of the political Gran Club del Pueblo and was elected to the National Assembly. Facundo was one of the first Paraguayan politicians who spoke in public to the people and managed to captivate the audience with his strong personality, his youth and culture. According to the biography written by José Segundo Decoud, Facundo was a good speaker but had difficulties with writing. As a lawyer he was a member of the commission that created the Constitution of 1870, and he was a contributor to Paraguay's first private newspaper, La Regeneración.

=== Presidency ===
The Paraguayan Provisional government of 1869 consisted of Colonel Carlos Loizaga, Cirilo Antonio Rivarola and Jose Diaz de Bedoya. In May 1870 José Díaz de Bedoya resigned and on August 31, 1870, Carlos Loizaga also resigned. The remaining member Antonio Rivarola was then relieved of his duties by the National Assembly which established a provisional Presidency to which he was elected and assumed post on August 31, 1870.

Machaín was elected by 37 votes against 5. He swore the following oath: "I swear before the God and the Country, to fulfill truthfully my duties as President and all the dispositions of the Sovereign Constituent Convention". But only 12 hours after, in a plot planned by Cirilo Antonio Rivarola, Candido Bareiro and with the help of some Allied forces, he was overthrown on September 1, 1870, in the first coup after the war.

=== Later career ===
He was appointed to be a member of the Supreme Court of Justice in 1872. Despite them being political opponents, President Juan Bautista Gill appointed him as the foreign minister in June 1874.

In 1876 he negotiated and signed with the Argentine Minister Bernardo de Irigoyen the Machaín-Irigoyen Treaty on February 3, 1876, under which Paraguay officially ceded Misiones Province and part of Gran Chaco territory. It also made possible the removal of Allied occupation forces from Paraguay by July 3, 1876.

== Arrest and murder ==
He worked as a journalist and was professor and the first director of the Colegio Nacional de Asunción (Asunción's National School). From that building he saw the assassination of President Juan Bautista Gill in April 1877. When hearing the first shots he went out to one of the balconies that opened to the Libertad Street (nowadays called Eligio Ayala) shouting: "The President is being killed".

He agreed to defend those accused for the murder of President Gill. However, the political situation made him a victim of political passions. He was imprisoned and placed in the same cell as his defendants, among whom was José Dolores Molas, an army officer who a few years earlier had led a revolt against the government in Asuncion.

Under orders from Candido Bareiro and Bernardino Caballero, Facundo was murdered by prison guards in his prison cell on 29 October 1877 at the age of 32. His death caused great sadness in Paraguayan society. It was said that with him Paraguayan writing lost a great professor.

A street in Asuncion, in the neighborhood of Mariscal Estigarribia is named in his honor.

Political offices
Preceded by Cirilo Antonio Rivarola	President of Paraguay; 1870	Succeeded by Cirilo Antonio Rivarola
