= Ycuá Satí =

Coordinates: 25.2839°S 57.5522°W

- Barrio
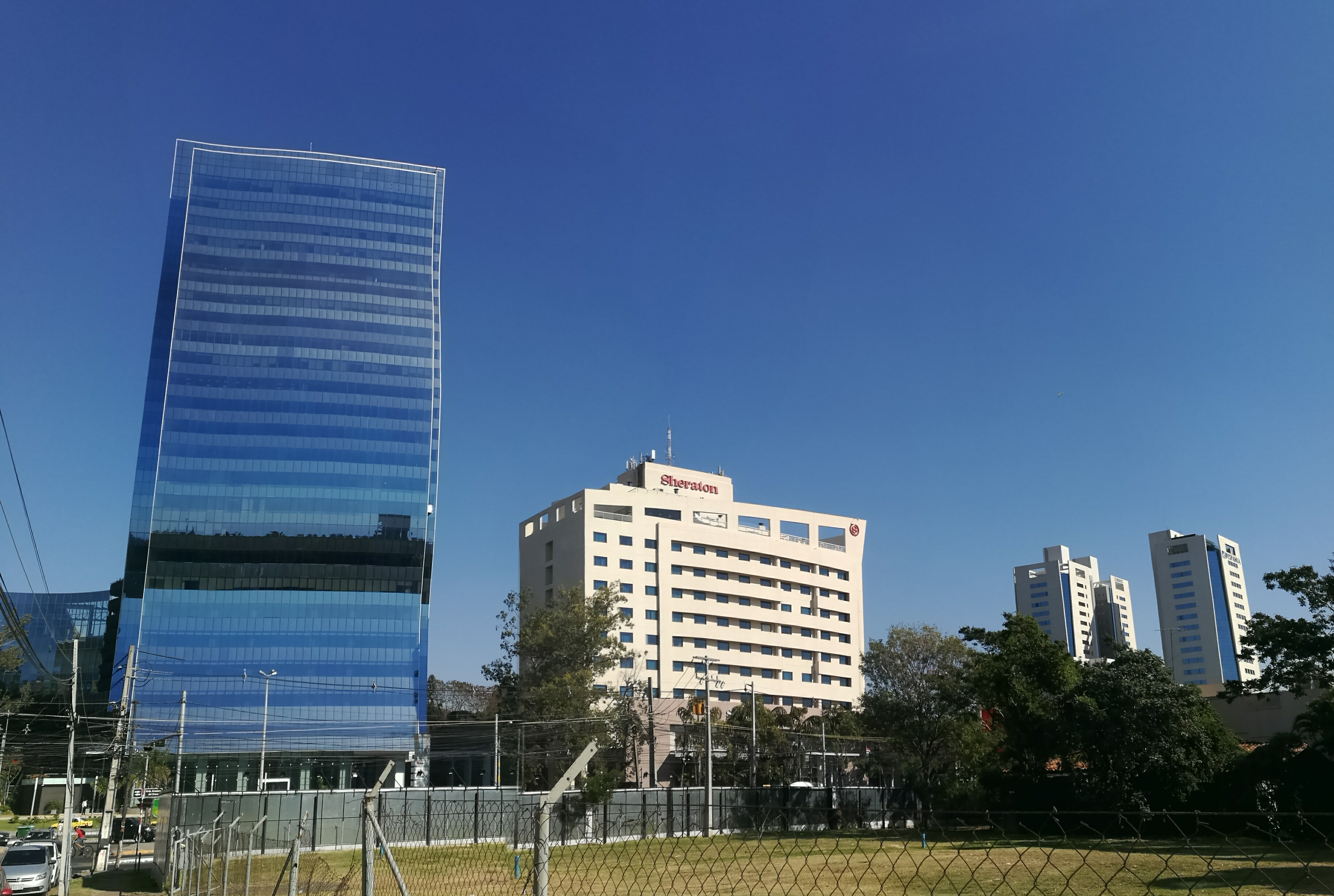
- Interactive map of Ycuá Satí
- Country: Paraguay
- Autonomous Capital District: Gran Asunción
- City: Asunción

Area
  - Total: 1.46 km^{2} (0.56 sq mi)
- Elevation: 43 m (141 ft)

Population
  - Total: 7,072

Ycuá Satí is a neighbourhood (barrio) of Asunción, Paraguay.
