= Carlos Loizaga =

Paraguayan politician

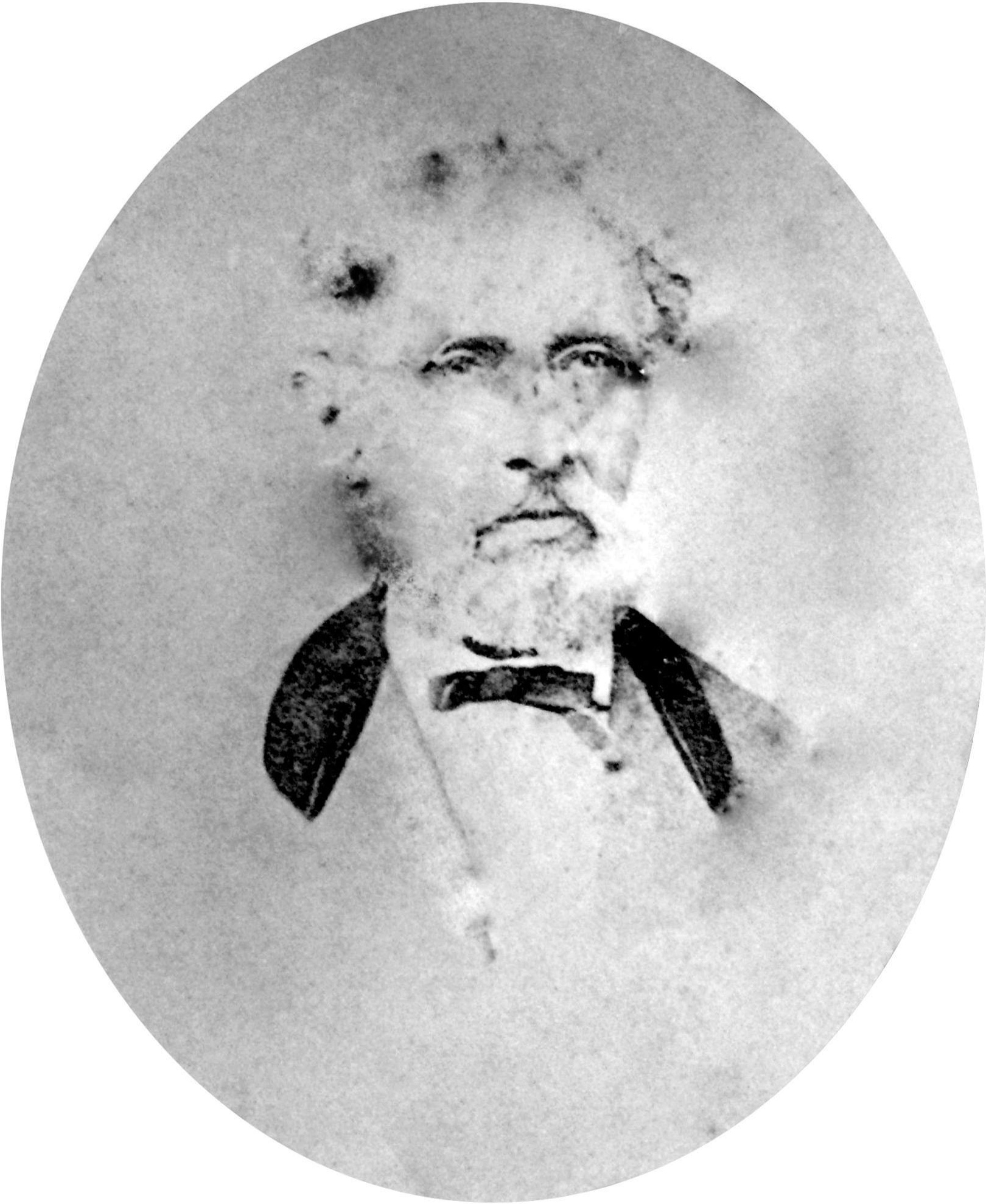

Triumvir of Paraguay
- In office 15 August 1869 – 31 August 1870 Serving with Cirilo Rivarola, Díaz de Bedoya
- Preceded by: Francisco Solano López
- Succeeded by: Facundo Machaín

Personal details
- Born: Asunción, Viceroyalty of the Río de la Plata
- Died: Asunción, Paraguay

Carlos Loizaga was member of the Paraguayan Triumvirate established by the occupying allied forces following the fall of Asunción from 15 August 1869 to 31 August 1870. He was a member of the Paraguayan Legion. After the war, he signed the Loizaga–Cotegipe Treaty of peace and borders between the Empire of Brazil and Paraguay, giving Brazil all the territories north of the Apa River that it had claimed before the war, a total of 62,325 square kilometers (24,064 sq mi).
