= San Jorge (Asunción) =

Coordinates: 20°27′S 58°40′W

- Barrio
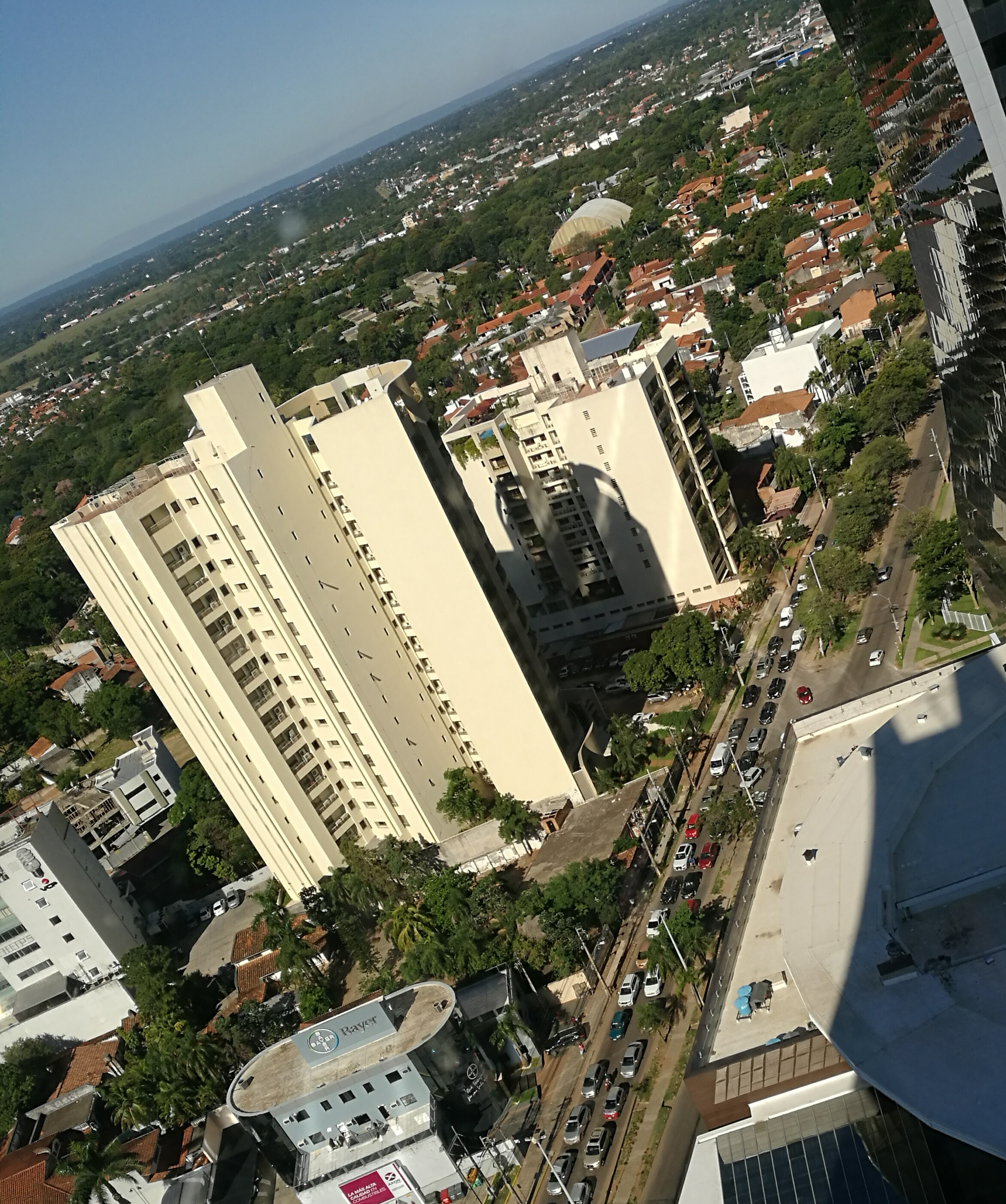
- Interactive map of San Jorge
- Country: Paraguay
- Autonomous Capital District: Gran Asunción
- City: Asunción

San Jorge is a neighbourhood (barrio) of Asunción, Paraguay.
