= Carlos A. López =

- Barrio
- Interactive map of Carlos A. López
- Country: Paraguay
- Autonomous Capital District: Gran Asunción
- City: Asunción

Carlos A. López is a neighbourhood (barrio) of Asunción, Paraguay.
