= José Díaz de Bedoya =

Paraguayan politician (1820–1872)

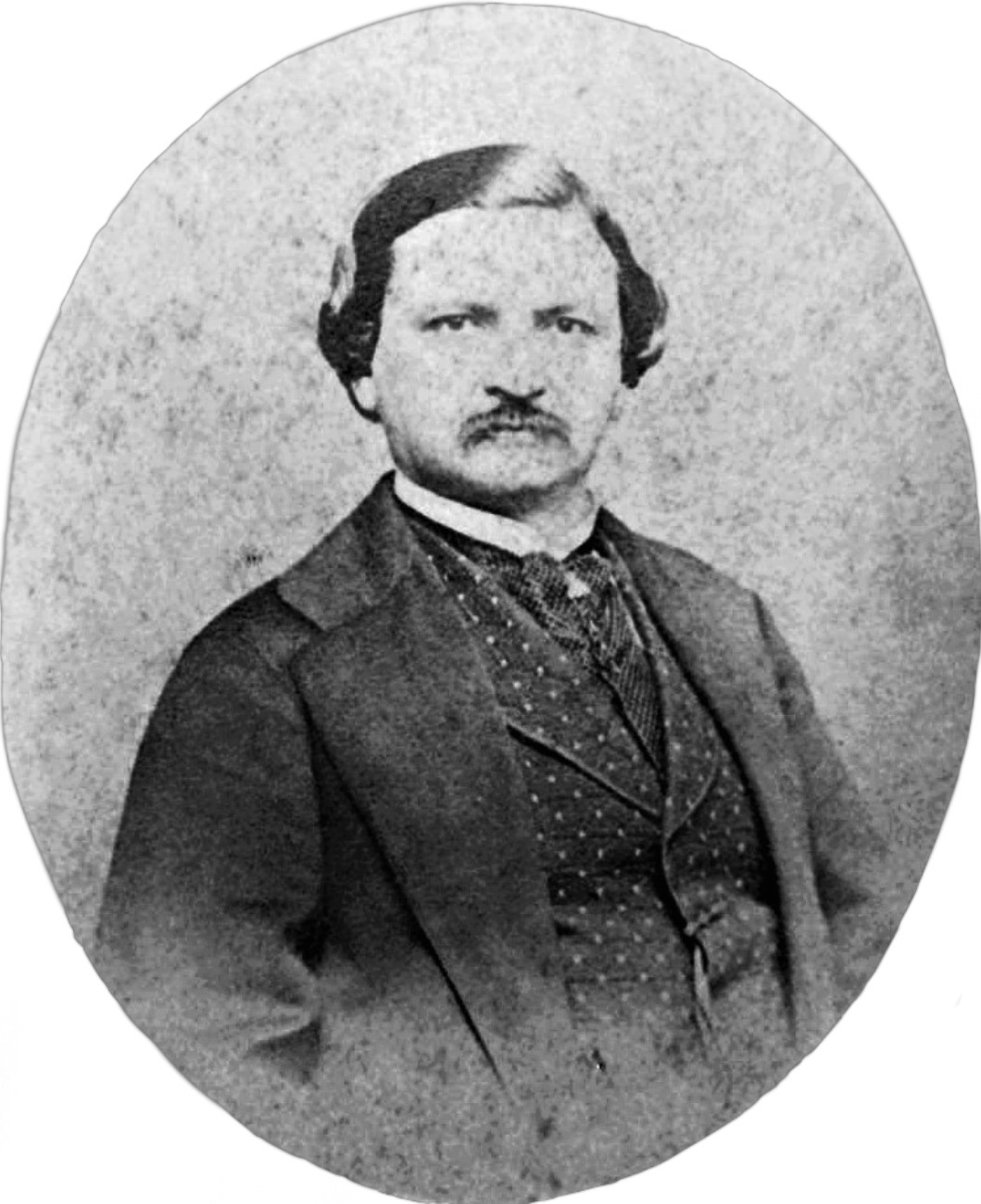

Triumvir of Paraguay
- In office 15 August 1869 – 31 August 1870 Serving with Cirilo Rivarola, Carlos Loizaga
- Preceded by: Francisco Solano López
- Succeeded by: Facundo Machaín

Personal details
- Born: 19 November 1820 Asunción, Viceroyalty of the Río de la Plata
- Died: 9 December 1872 (aged 52) Buenos Aires, Argentina

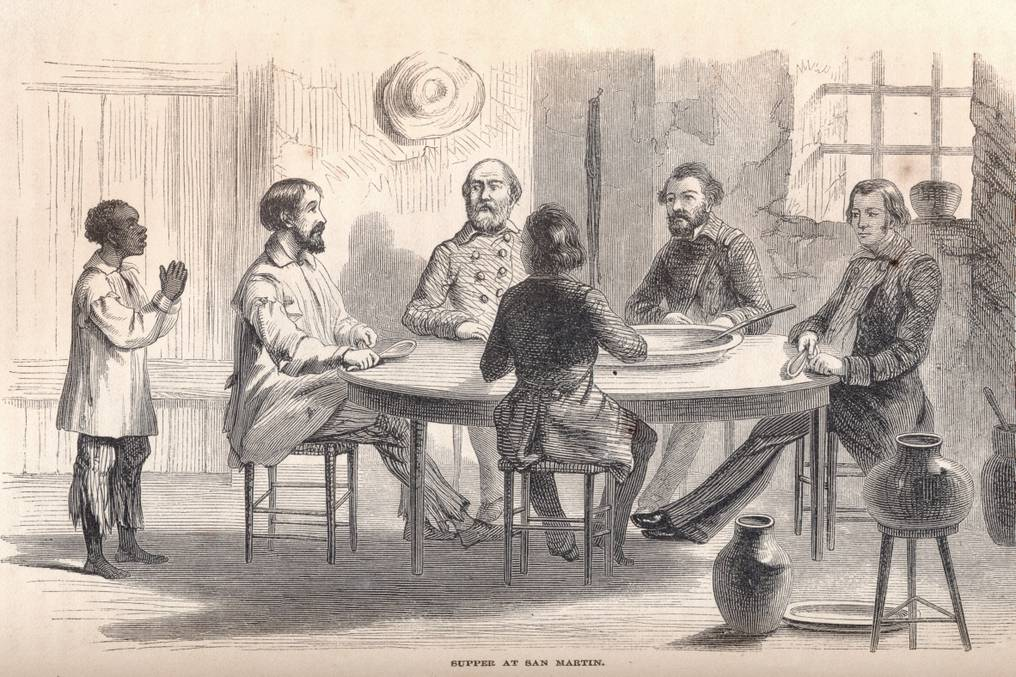
Captain José Díaz de Bedoya, circa 1859

José Díaz de Bedoya (19 November 1820 – 9 December 1872) was member in Paraguayan Triumvirate following death of Francisco Solano López from November 1870 to 10 December 1870. He was Minister of Finance of Paraguay from 1869 to 1870.
