= Cirilo Antonio Rivarola =

4th President of Paraguay

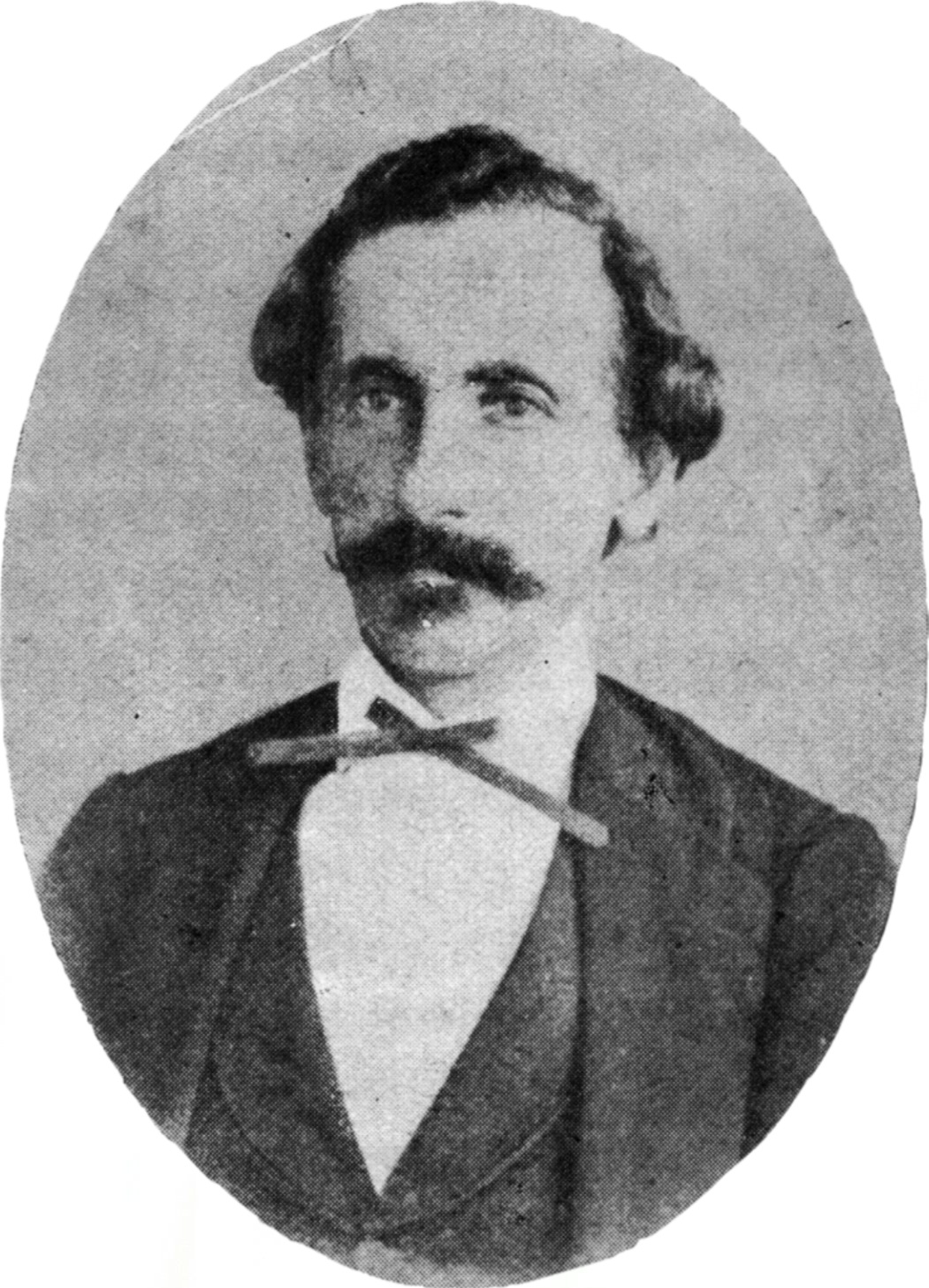

4th President of Paraguay
- In office 1 September 1870 – 18 December 1871
- Vice President: Cayo Miltos; Salvador Jovellanos
- Preceded by: Facundo Machaín
- Succeeded by: Salvador Jovellanos

Triumvir of Paraguay
- In office 15 August 1869 – 31 August 1870 Serving with Carlos Loizaga and José Díaz de Bedoya
- Preceded by: Francisco Solano López (as President)
- Succeeded by: Facundo Machaín (as President)

Personal details
- Born: 1836 Eusebio Ayala, Paraguay
- Died: December 31, 1878 (aged 42) Asunción, Paraguay
- Cause of death: Stabbed to death
- Parents: Juan Bautista Rivarola (father); Maria Felipa Acosta (mother)

Cirilo Antonio Rivarola Acosta (1836 – 31 December 1878) was the 4th President of Paraguay and served from 1870 to 1871.

== Biography ==
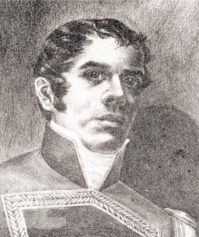
Portrait of Capt. Juan Bautista Rivarola, Cirilo's father

The Rivarola family was important in Paraguayan politics throughout the 19th century, and often found itself at odds with the Francia and López governments. During most of the War of the Triple Alliance, Rivarola served in the Paraguayan Army, reaching the rank of Sergeant. In 1869, however, amidst a wave of repression led by then president Francisco Solano López, he was arrested due to reasons unknown. He then escaped captivity and in some of the war's remaining months served as a spy for the allies. Afterwards, he went to Asunción, where, thanks in part to his good relations with the Brazilian authorities, he was made one of the triumvirs who headed the provisional government that was created (mostly by Silva Paranhos, the chief Brazilian diplomat in Paraguay then).

As both other triumvirs eventually resigned, Rivarola wound up being president of Paraguay until August 31, 1870, when the Paraguayan Congress elected Facundo Machaín president along with the new constitution's proclamation. On the very next day, however, Rivarola's presidency was renewed, as the Brazilian occupiers disagreed with Machaín's nomination. Rivarola then presided over Paraguay's settlement with the alliance, the return to peace, and the harsh first years of the 1870s. His government privatized large amounts of state land and the Asunción–Villarrica railway and abolished export tariffs on yerba mate and timber, measures that benefited a small circle of landowning families who came to dominate Paraguayan politics in the following decades.

He resigned in December 1871 due to a constitutional crisis. This was part of a ploy he had orchestrated with Juan Bautista Gill, president of the senate, where Gill would refuse his resignation and give him more power, but when the motion came to the Senate floor, Gill accepted it unreservedly.

During the next few years, Rivarola, owner of an important estate in the south of the country, several times rebelled against the government in Asunción, most of them with Argentinian support, for during the 1870s Brazilian influence was preponderant in most Paraguayan governments. In 1878, while on his way to a meeting with President Cándido Bareiro, after he had been given a pardon, Rivarola was assassinated, stabbed to death by masked individuals in broad daylight. No one was ever arrested for this crime, despite it having happened less than 100 meters from the presidential palace.

Political offices
Preceded by Francisco Solano López	Member of the Triumvirate; 1869-1870	Succeeded by Facundo Machaín
Preceded by Facundo Machaín	President of Paraguay; 1870–1871	Succeeded by Salvador Jovellanos
