= Carlos Antonio López =

1st president of Paraguay

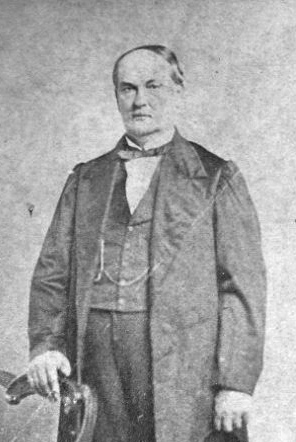
- Portrait, c. 1861

1st President of Paraguay
- In office 13 March 1844 – 10 September 1862
- Vice President: Mariano González (1845–1846); Francisco Solano López (1862)
- Preceded by: himself as Consul
- Succeeded by: Francisco Solano López

Consul of Paraguay
- In office 12 March 1841 – 13 March 1844
- Preceded by: Mariano Roque Alonso
- Succeeded by: himself as President

Personal details
- Born: 4 November 1792 Asunción, Intendancy of Paraguay, Viceroyalty of the Río de la Plata, Spanish Empire
- Died: 10 September 1862 (aged 69) Asunción, Paraguay
- Party: None
- Spouse: Juana Pabla Carrillo
- Children: Francisco; Venancio; Benigno; Rafaela; Inocencia

Carlos Antonio López Ynsfrán (4 November 1792 – 10 September 1862) was leader of Paraguay from 1841 to 1862. Under his presidency, he undertook a process of economic and political modernization for Paraguay, and ended the isolationist policies of Paraguay dictator José Gaspar Rodríguez de Francia.

== Early life ==
López was born at Manorá (Asunción) on 4 November 1792, as one of eight children. He graduated from Real Colegio y Seminario de San Carlos and then began a law practice, a profession which allowed him to develop influential connections. He attracted the hostility of the dictator José Gaspar Rodríguez de Francia, his reputed uncle, which caused him to go into hiding for several years.

== Political career ==
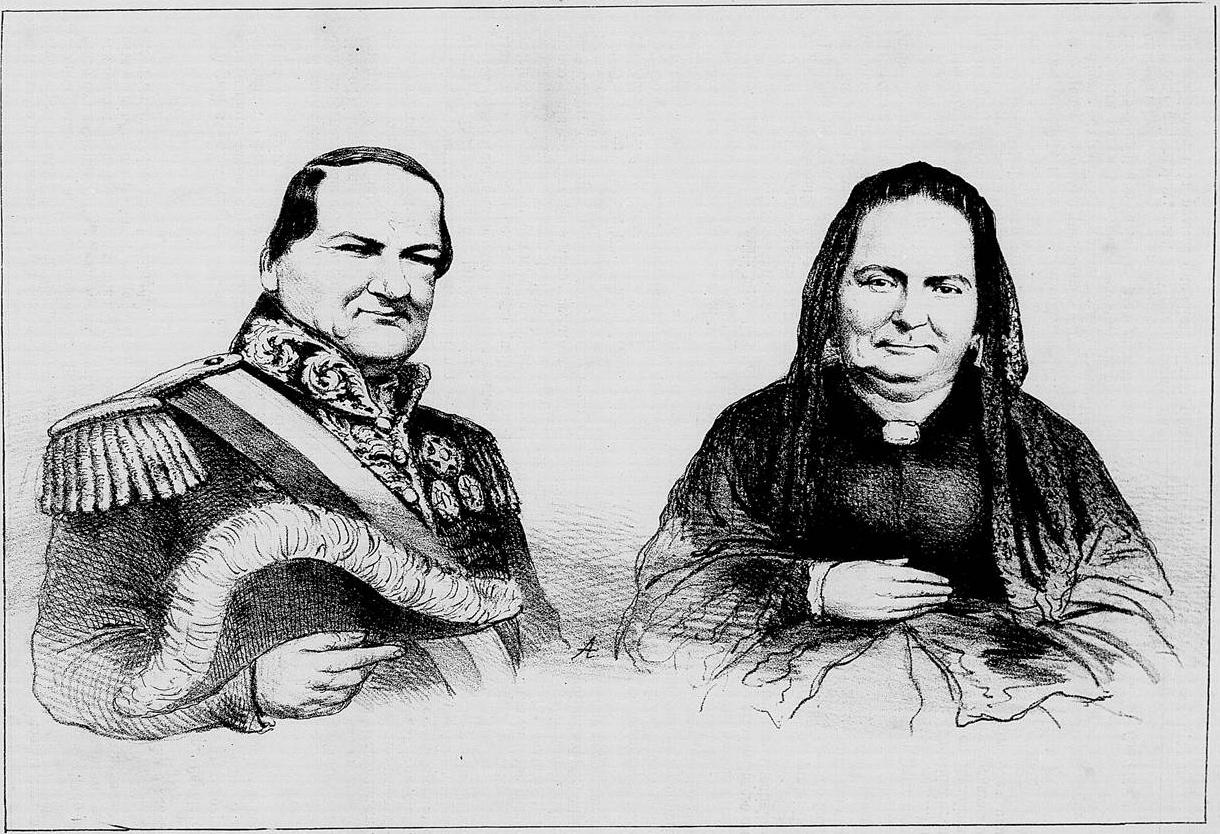
Carlos Antonio López and his wife, Juana Pabla Carrillo

López was briefly secretary of the military junta led by Colonel Mariano Roque Alonso that ruled the country from 1840 to 1841, after the death of Francia. On 12 March 1841, Congress chose López and Roque to be joint consuls for three years. In 1844, he exiled Roque and assumed dictatorial powers. A few months later, Congress adopted a new constitution, which changed the head of state's title from consul to president and elected López to the new post for a 10-year term. The constitution vested López with powers almost as sweeping as those Francia had held for most of his 26-year rule, effectively codifying the dictatorial powers he had seized just months earlier. The document included no guarantees of civil rights; indeed, the word "liberty" was not even in the text.

He was re-elected for a three-year term in 1854 and again in 1857 for ten more years, with the power to nominate his own successor.

His government was directed towards developing Paraguay's primary resource extraction and strengthening Paraguay's armed forces. He contracted numerous foreign technicians, most of whom were British, and built up the formidable Fortress of Humaitá.

Before the constitution adopted in 1844 that legitimized López’s presidency, Paraguay had no official document of sovereignty; López’s influence led to the recognition of Paraguay as an independent nation. However, his approach to foreign affairs several times involved him in diplomatic disputes with the Empire of Brazil, the United States, and the British Empire, which nearly resulted in war.

His government was somewhat more tolerant of opposition than Francia's had been. He released all political prisoners soon after he took full power and also took measures to abolish slavery.

During his presidency, Paraguay’s economy saw unprecedented growth. He signed commercial treaties with Brazil in 1850, with Great Britain, France and the United States in 1853, and with and Argentina in 1856. His government worked to improve infrastructure and transportation within the country through the establishment of a new railroad line and steamship river routes. López also encouraged public education through the expansion of primary schools and the reopening of the seminary he attended as a young man, which increased literacy throughout the country. Textile factories and shipyards for shipbuilding were established, and agriculture was promoted. National production of yerba mate, tobacco, and timber once again sought foreign markets. One of its most famous projects was the Ybycuí Iron Foundry, where iron tools and cannons were produced.

In 1858 the United States sent a nineteen-ship squadron to South America after President James Buchanan threatened Paraguay with reprisals for refusing to ratify the commercial treaty negotiated in 1853, a Paraguay fort firing on U.S.S. Water Witch in 1856, and allegedly expelling an American company from Paraguay. In the estimation of American scholar John Hoyt Williams, López mastered the threat of massive naval coercion by a superior power at minimal cost to his pride or reputation". Thereafter he resolved "to make Paraguay so strong that further intervention was impossible".

His eldest son, Francisco Solano López (1827–1870), succeeded him as president after his death. A barrio of Asuncion is named after him.

== Honours ==
- Kingdom of Sardinia : Knight Grand Cordon of the Order of Saints Maurice and Lazarus.

== See also ==
- History of Paraguay
- List of presidents of Paraguay

== Sources ==
- Plá, Josefina (1976). The British in Paraguay 1850–1870. The Richmond Publishing Co in association with St Antony's College, Oxford.
- Williams, John Hoyt (1977). "Foreign Tecnicos and the Modernization of Paraguay". Journal of Interamerican Studies and World Affairs. Center for Latin American Studies at the University of Miam: 233–257. doi:10.2307/174705. JSTOR 174705. (subscription required)
- Bealer, Lewis (1937). "Carlos Antonio Lopez, Organizer and Dictator of the Paraguayan Republic". In Wilgus, Alva (ed.). South American Dictators During the First Century of Independence. George Washington University Press. pp. 136–153. ISBN 9780846203391.
- Burton, Richard (1870). Letters from the Battlefields of Paraguay. Tinsley Brothers.
- Gelly, Andres (1926). El Paraguay. de Indias.

Political offices
Preceded by Mariano Roque Alonso	Consul of Paraguay; 1841–1844	Succeeded by himself as President
Preceded by himself as Consul	President of Paraguay; 1844–1862	Succeeded by Francisco Solano López
