= Borgo Pusterla =

District of Vicenza, Italy

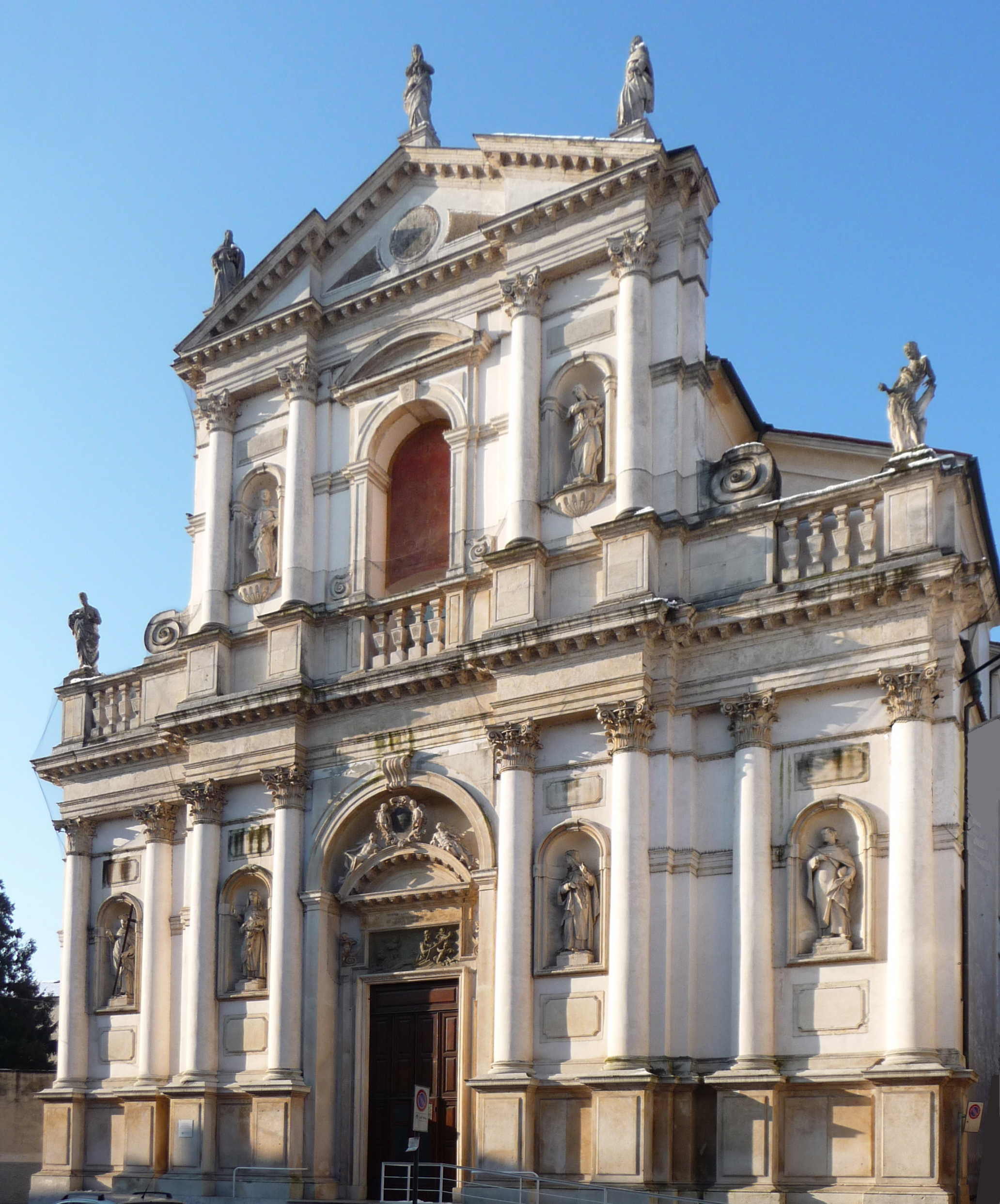
- Façade of the church of San Marco in San Girolamo in Vicenza
- Country: Italy
- Region: Veneto
- Province: Vicenza
- City: Vicenza
- Circoscrizione: 1 Centro
- Postal code: 36100
- Population: 2,350
- Patron saint: Saint Mark

Borgo Pusterla or Borgo San Marco is the part of the historic center of Vicenza that developed - during the Middle Ages and especially during the modern age - along the ancient road that led north out of the city from Porta Pusterla, in the area between the Bacchiglione river to the south, the Venetian fortified walls (the present-day Viale Bartolomeo D'Alviano and Viale Fratelli Bandiera) to the north and the Astichello river to the east.

== History ==
=== Roman era ===
Until the end of the first millennium, the whole area was marshland and subject to frequent flooding from the torrential river Astico, which at that time flowed roughly in the present-day bed of the Astichello. Before reaching the city, where it encountered a hill - formed by debris carried by its own waters - that forced it to deviate towards the east, the Astico widened to an average width of 700–800 meters and a length of a few kilometers, in a marshy strip called Lacus Pusterlae, although there is a lack of early medieval sources documenting its existence.

Given the condition of the terrain, the area was probably not inhabited, but a road - an extension of the cardo maximus or in any case of one of the cardines of the Roman city - started from a passage or a gate in the city walls and headed north, along the lake and then the right bank of the Astico towards Montecchio Precalcino, and finally up into Valdastico.

=== Middle Ages ===
Toponyms

It is probable that the toponym Pusterla originates from the word postierla or posterula - minor or secondary gate, in this case in relation to the main ones Porta Feliciana and Porta San Pietro - receiving the name from the gate that formed part of the early medieval city walls, leading to the Borgo.

For the Borgo and the vast area adjacent to it - the cultivated area extended as far as the Marchese bridge over the Bacchiglione - from the 17th century the name San Marco was also used, taken from that of the parish church - one of the seven ancient chapels of the city, which stood near the Pusterla bridge.

The hydrographic layout remained unchanged until the end of the 11th century, when the inhabitants of Vicenza themselves, to reduce the danger of the recurring floods of the Astico, diverted its course north of Montecchio Precalcino and directed it towards the Tesina, allowing only a part of the water to reach Vicenza, namely the Astichello, which continued to flow in the old riverbed.

The spring waters that flowed near Dueville, swollen by the Igna, Timonchio and Orolo rivers, allowed the formation of a new watercourse, the Bacchiglione, which flowed down from the north towards the city; compared to the Astico it was much less impetuous and a little less subject to flooding. At the end of the 12th century the rivers of Vicenza had by then reached their current layout and name. After this deviation, what remained - that is, the Astichello river - no longer had enough flow to feed the lake, which slowly began to dry up. When the lake was mentioned in documents in the 14th century, it was limited to a small area north of the city that, even today, is called Laghetto.

It was probably at this time that the Borgo Pusterla began to take shape and grow. Initially subject, from an ecclesiastical point of view, to the ancient little church of San Lorenzo in Porta Nova, it became a parish when the first church of San Marco was built just outside the bridge, now necessary to cross the Bacchiglione. The church of San Marco was located in an inhospitable area that was often subject to flooding; it therefore had to be restored several times over the centuries. It depended on the cathedral and therefore had no baptismal font; it functioned as a parish church until 1810, when - after the Napoleonic suppression of religious orders - it was exchanged with that of the Discalced Carmelites and, immediately afterwards, demolished.

It is documented that at the beginning of the 13th century there was a wooden bridge with three arches, which was rebuilt in Montecchio stone in 1231 and which in the Statutes of the Municipality of Vicenza of 1264 was called Ponte Vetus (“old bridge”), that is, the Pusterla bridge. At the end of the bridge there was a tower with a drawbridge and a portcullis.

Meanwhile, a few hundred meters further on, at the beginning of the century, the monastery of San Bartolomeo had been built, which served as the main seat of the Canons Regular of St. Augustine of the Congregation of San Marco of Mantua; the monastery was for both men and women, but they lived in separate environments and had two different priors.

At the beginning of the 14th century, however, there are reports of the existence of a hospital, more or less in the area where the convent of San Francesco Nuovo was later built, run by a confraternity of Battuti, which certainly had its own church nearby.

=== 15th century ===
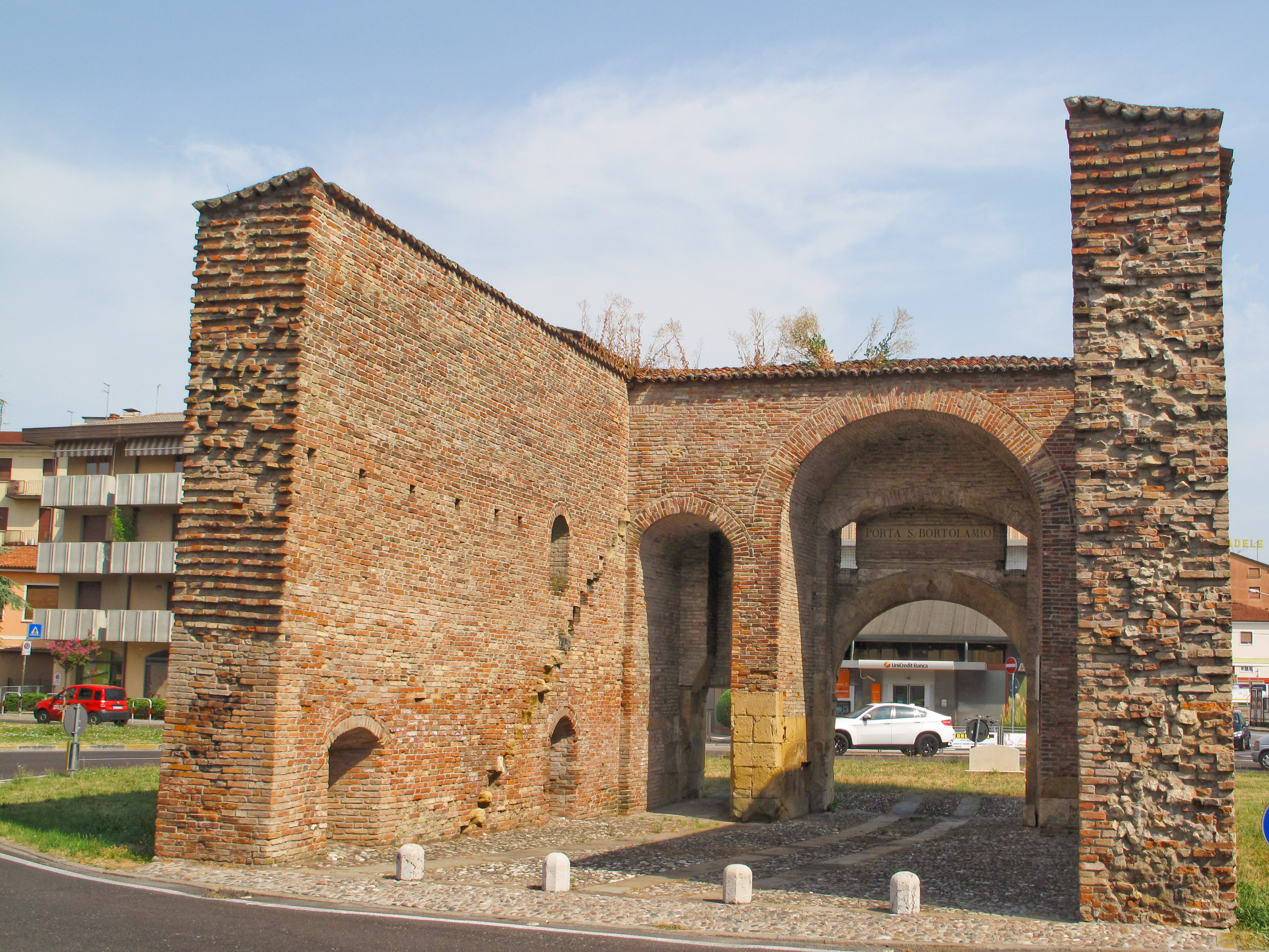
Porta San Bortolo, built by the Venetians in 1435

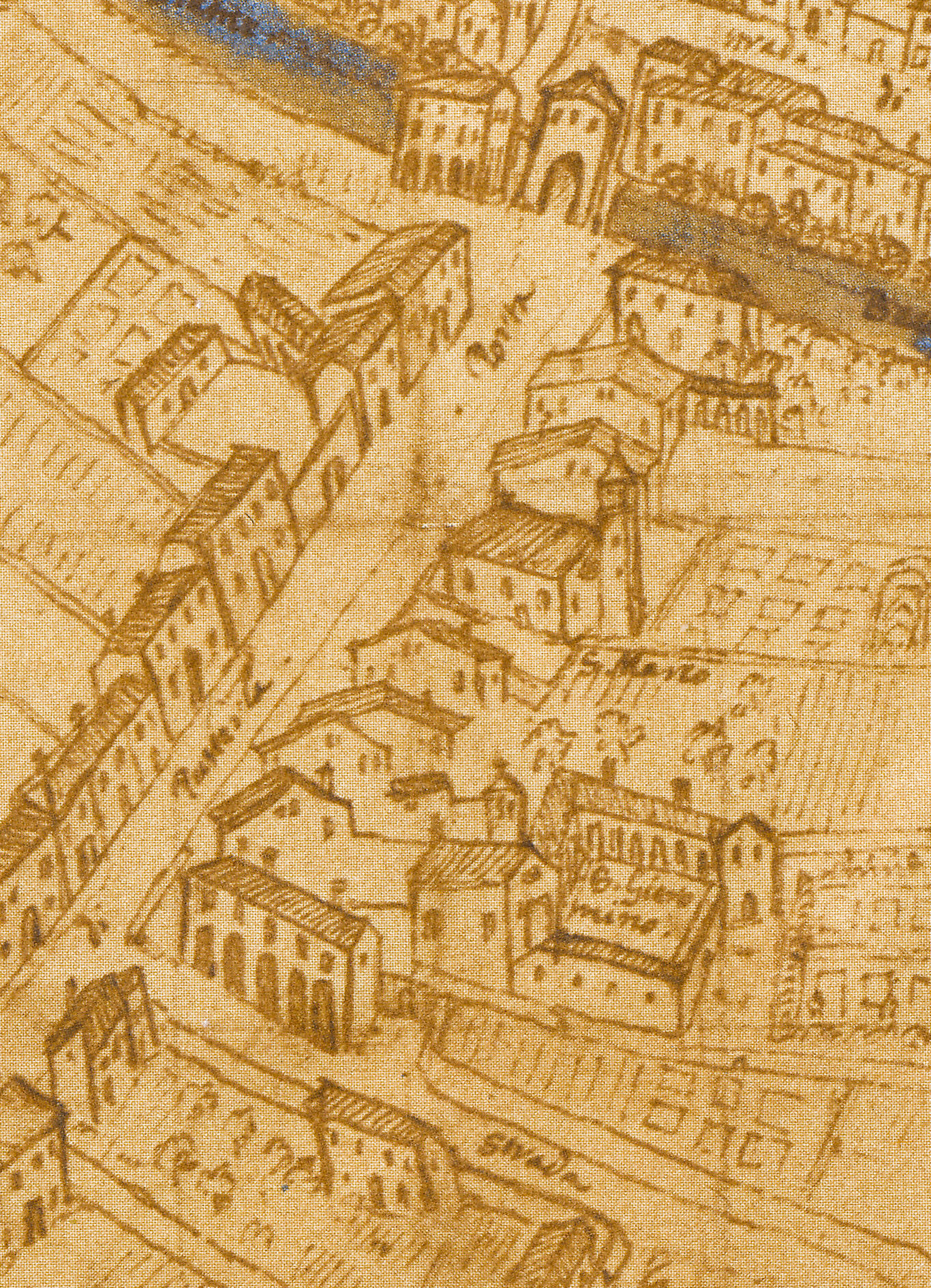
In the detail of the Angelica Map (1580) one can recognize the old parish church of San Marco (later demolished) and the church of San Girolamo dei Gesuati with its convent. At the top, at the beginning of the district, is Porta Pusterla.

In 1404 the Borgo was the theater of war between the Carraresi of Padua and the Visconti. Francesco III da Carrara had set up camp in the Borgo to besiege Vicenza and, towards the end of April, launched a furious attack against Porta Pusterla, without however succeeding in conquering it and entering the city. In the meantime, however, the people of Vicenza had ended their allegiance to Venice and the Paduan condottiero was forced to lift the siege and withdraw, to avoid a confrontation with the Serenissima.

In 1419, by order of Pope Martin V, who intended to abolish double monasteries, San Bartolomeo became a monastery for men only: the regular canons who came from the monastery of San Tommaso moved there, while the nuns moved to San Bartolomeo. This concentration didn't favor San Bartolomeo, however, which, reduced to a minimum with only three monks, was given in commendam in 1435, first to Ermolao Barbaro, bishop of Verona, then to the regular canons of Santa Maria di Frigionaia near Lucca, who took care of restoring it both spiritually and materially. The church was almost completely remodeled and rebuilt, with the addition of chapels and altars, commissioned and financed by noble families of the city; ten years later the monastery housed about fifteen clergymen.

Under the rule of Venice the area became increasingly populated and the Republic planned to fortify it. First it restored the Porta di Pusterla, which had been destroyed during the war with the Da Carrara family, then it dug a ditch that went from the Porta di Santa Lucia to the convent of San Bartolomeo; next to the latter in 1435 a large gate was built, which still exists today - albeit with a reduced height, without the tower and the drawbridge and with a bailey on only three sides - Porta di San Bortolo, restored in the 1990s.

A further project planned to connect this gate with that of Santa Croce by means of walls, but it was never carried out. Along this route, the previous ditch was extended, and a terreplein and five small circular towers were built inside it - a shape more suitable for the time when artillery and firearms were already in use - as requested by Bartolomeo d'Alviano. In any case, this partial fortification marked the border of the Borgo forever.

Meanwhile, around 1430, the Jesuati arrived in Vicenza. From 1499 they were friars of the congregation of St. Jerome who, first as guests at the castle of the noble Valmarana family and then at the hospital of Santa Maria della Misericordia, following successive exchanges of goods left to them by pious testators built the church, which was consecrated in 1491, and their monastery respectively in the space of a few decades. The Jesuati lived very poorly, providing a stable testimony of Christian life that lasted until the Council of Trent.

In addition to the hospital of Santa Maria della Misericordia, in the 15th century there was a small hospital with a church dedicated to Saint Mary in Pusterla in Borgo - in the place where the church and monastery of Saint Francis of the Poor Clares would later be built. It was the subject of a long dispute between the Confraternity of Saint Mary, St. Bartholomew and St. Mark - which managed it - and the Benedictine nuns of St. Catherine in Borgo Berga; in the end the rights of the Confraternity were recognized, and in 1503 it sold the hospital to the Poor Clares, who founded the monastery of San Francesco Nuovo there.

=== Modern Age: 16th-18th Centuries ===
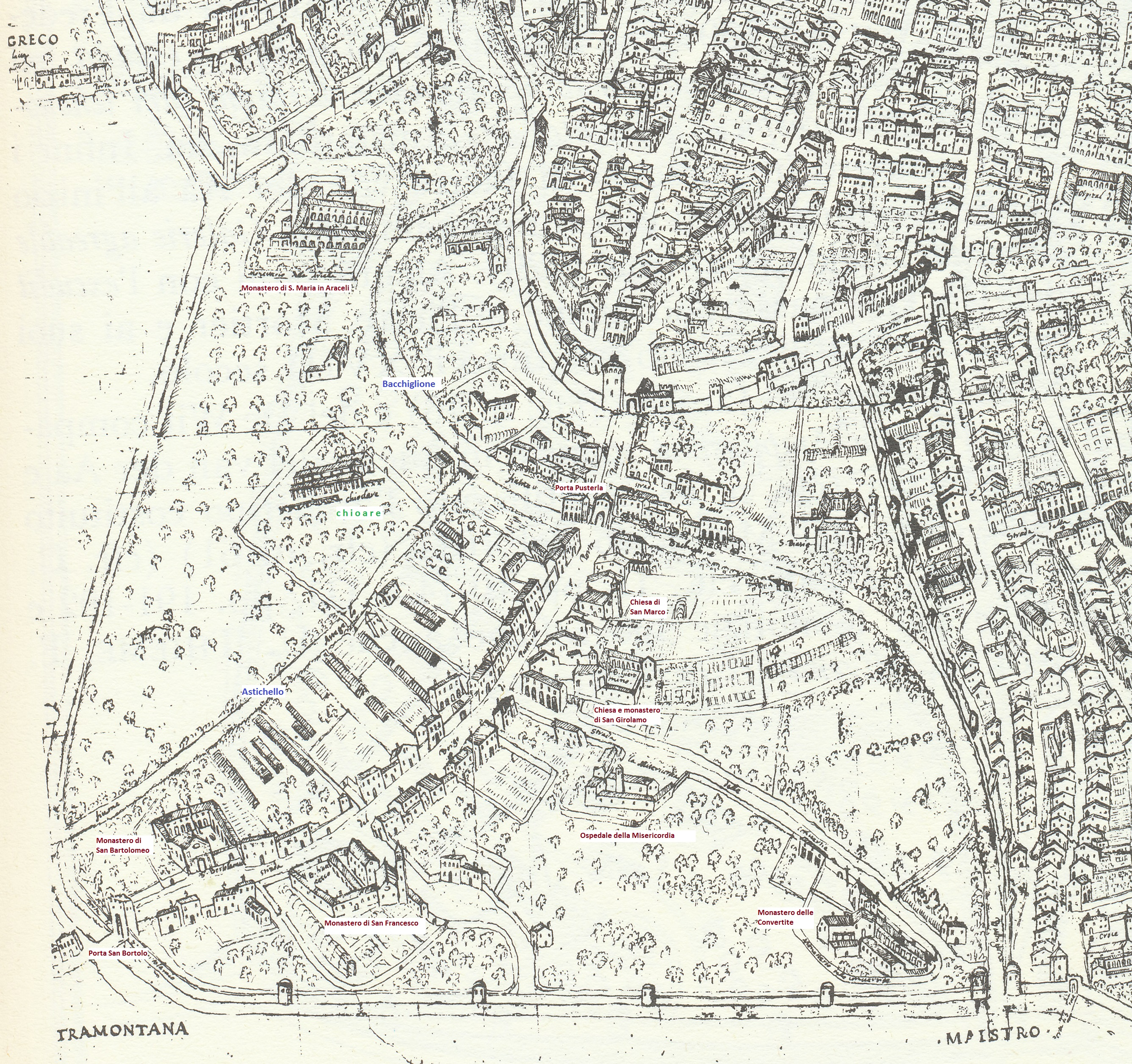
Pianta Angelica drawn in 1580 - detail with added information (visible with enlargement)

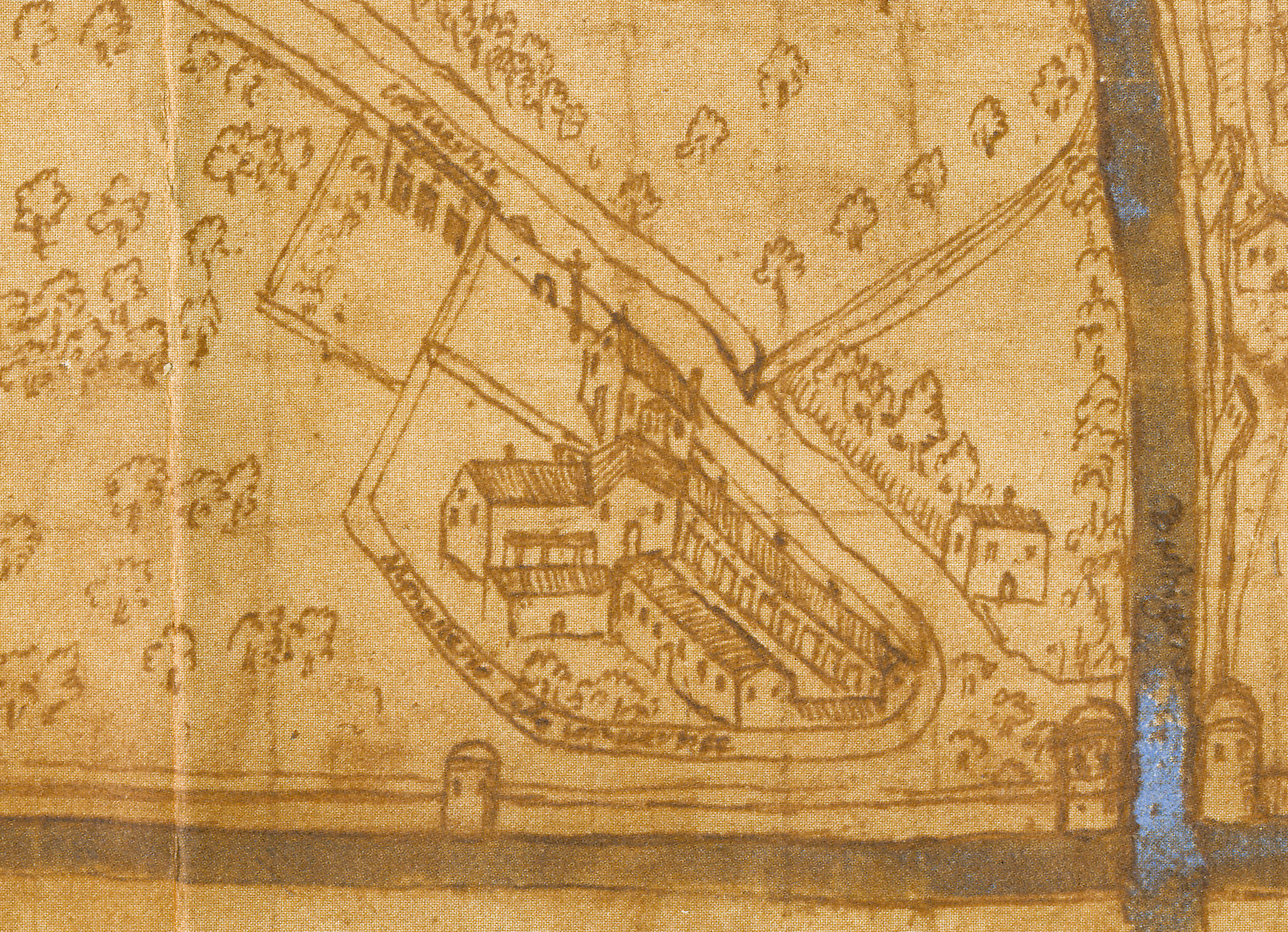
Pianta Angelica, 1580: the Monastery of the Converted

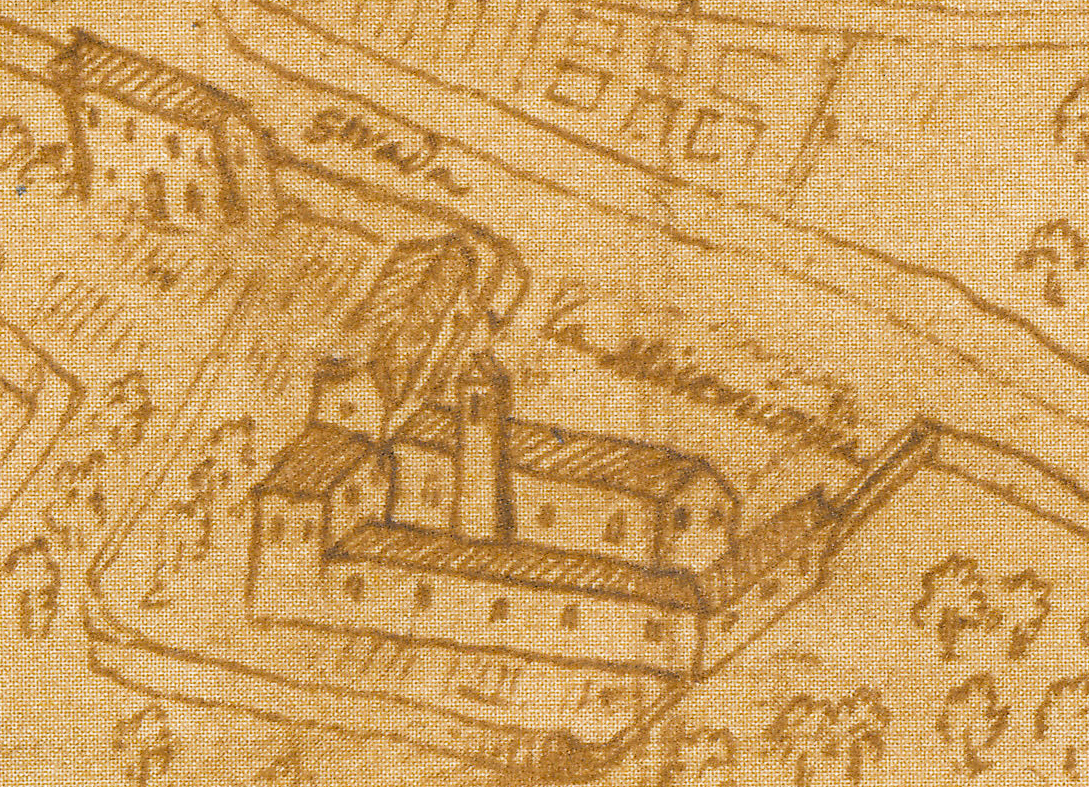
Pianta Angelica, 1580: the Hospital of Mercy

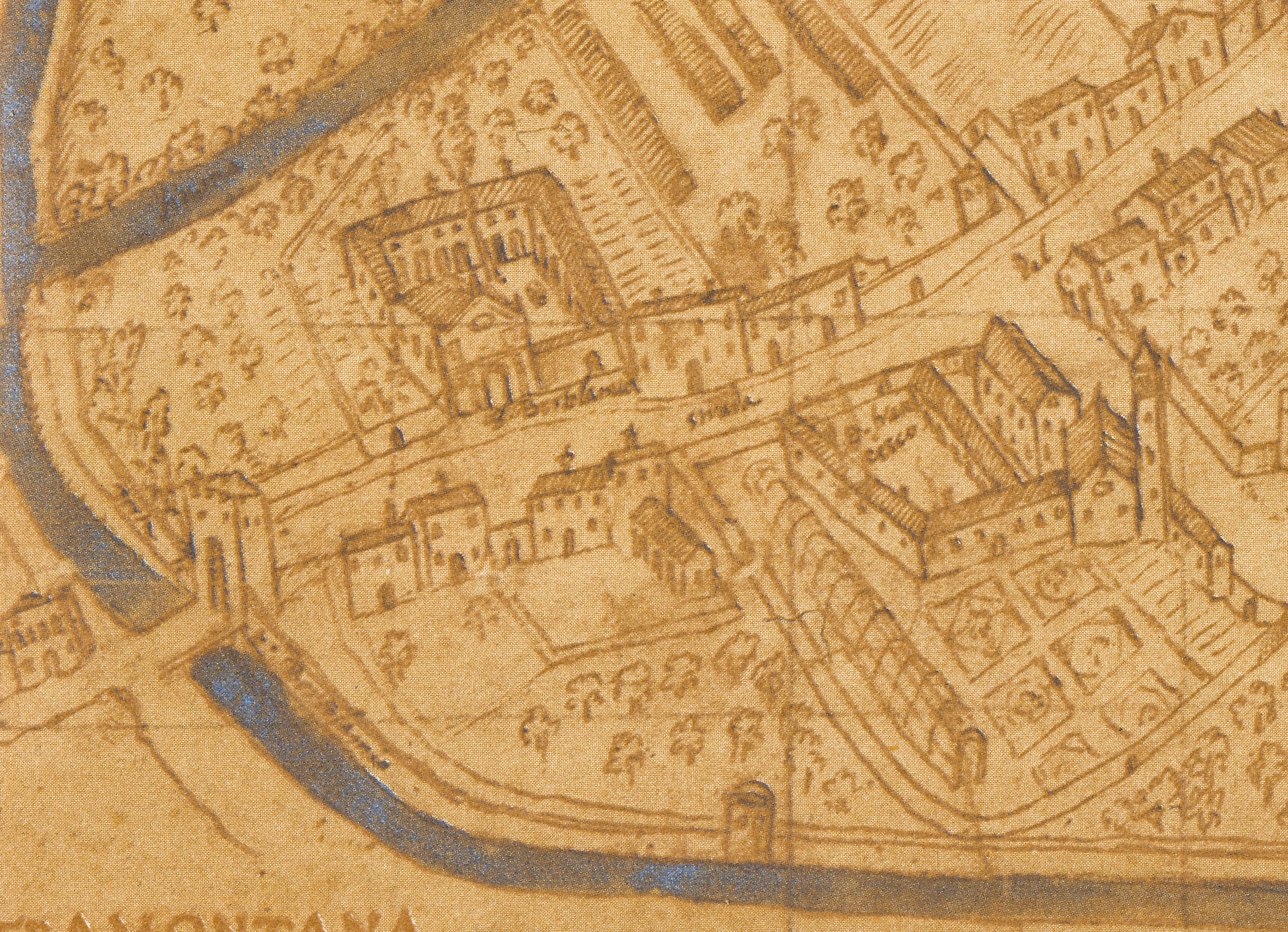
Pianta Angelica, 1580: the monasteries of St. Bartholomew and St. Francis

==== Monasteries ====
A century later the Borgo was still an area of monasteries.

Around 1500, on the site of an older monastery dedicated to St. Francis of Assisi, a new church was built at the expense of the Vicentine nobleman Carlo Volpe and, at the same time, a monastery dedicated to the same saint was built next to it, where a group of Poor Clares came from Borgo Berga, where the monastery of San Bernardino had become too small. The initiative for the construction was taken by five noblemen from Vicenza, who in 1497 had purchased, for the price of 600 ducats, unum sedimen magnum in the Borgo of Pusterla, with houses, a courtyard, a vegetable garden, a well and an oven, surrounded partly by walls and partly by a hedge.

According to the papal bull issued by Pope Alexander VI, the monastery was to be built on a decent and honorable site, with a church, humble bell towers, a bell, a dormitory, a refectory, a cemetery, vegetable gardens, orchards and other necessary facilities. However, the construction costs didn't prove to be a problem and the monastery was soon built, so that in 1503 six nuns entered, all from noble families in the city; this first group soon grew and at times the number of nuns reached 70, in addition to the choir girls and lay sisters.

As for San Bartolomeo, various documents show that in the second half of the 16th century the monastery was in a relatively good condition, with an internal school and a library of a certain importance, a conspicuous patrimony that could boast the highest income among the other Vicentine monasteries after that of San Felice, and buildings in excellent condition. It could also count on its direct links with the Holy See and its relative support.

During the 17th century, however, it declined considerably and the Venetian government, with the decree of May 16, 1771, suppressed it and confiscated its assets; the City Council of Vicenza then made a request to obtain the convent complex and use it as a hospital for the sick. As a result, in the following years other city hospitals were merged with San Bortolo: in 1771 the hospital of Sant'Antonio Abate and in 1776 that of Santi Pietro e Paolo in Contrà San Pietro.

The church of San Girolamo, officiated by the Jesuati, was for centuries under the patronage of the Arnaldi family, who, with substantial donations, had the central chapel and some side altars built. However, the order of the Jesuati was dissolved by Pope Clement IX in 1668 in order to recover their assets, sell them to other religious orders and use the proceeds to fund the war against the Turks. The Discalced Carmelites took their place and in the first half of the 18th century they began building the present church of San Marco, with the façade facing the main street; the new church, which retained the dedication to St. Jerome, was also dedicated to St. Teresa of Ávila, the patron saint of the Carmelites.

==== Hospitals ====
With the proceeds from the sale of the hospital of Santa Maria in Pusterla, the Confraternity of Santa Maria, San Bartolomeo and San Marco - which in the meantime had merged with the secret Society of San Girolamo, also known as the Oratory of Divine Love, founded by the blessed Bernardine of Feltre - purchased “a house and adjacent vegetable gardens”, opposite the church of the Jesuati and in 1521 began the construction of a new and large hospital, mainly intended for those suffering from the French disease.

In 1531 the Misericordia hospital became mainly a refuge for orphans - the first orphanage in Vicenza - and a hospice for foundlings, which proved indispensable during the years of the great famines. A few years later, in 1563, the sick were transferred to the hospital of Sant'Antonio and the foundlings to the hospice of San Marcello; the Misericordia - whose direction was entrusted to the Somaschi fathers, founded by Gerolamo Miani and established in Vicenza in 1558, but under the patronage of the Municipality of Vicenza, which exercised considerable interference in its management - was reserved exclusively for orphans, a function it performed for centuries: in the second half of the twentieth century it was still the seat of the city's women's orphanage, known as the Soccorsetto. The current church - which was also one of the best endowed and best cared for in the following centuries - and the entire Misericordia complex are the result of renovations at the end of the 16th and 18th centuries.

Around 1530, near the Misericordia, towards the Ponte Novo, the church and monastery of Santa Maria Maddalena or delle Convertite were built on the initiative of the noblewoman Maddalena Valmarana, with the aim of providing a refuge for young women who had gone astray and wanted to change their lives. A century later, however, the church was in a state of serious disrepair and the sacristy had even collapsed.

==== Economic activities and noble palaces ====
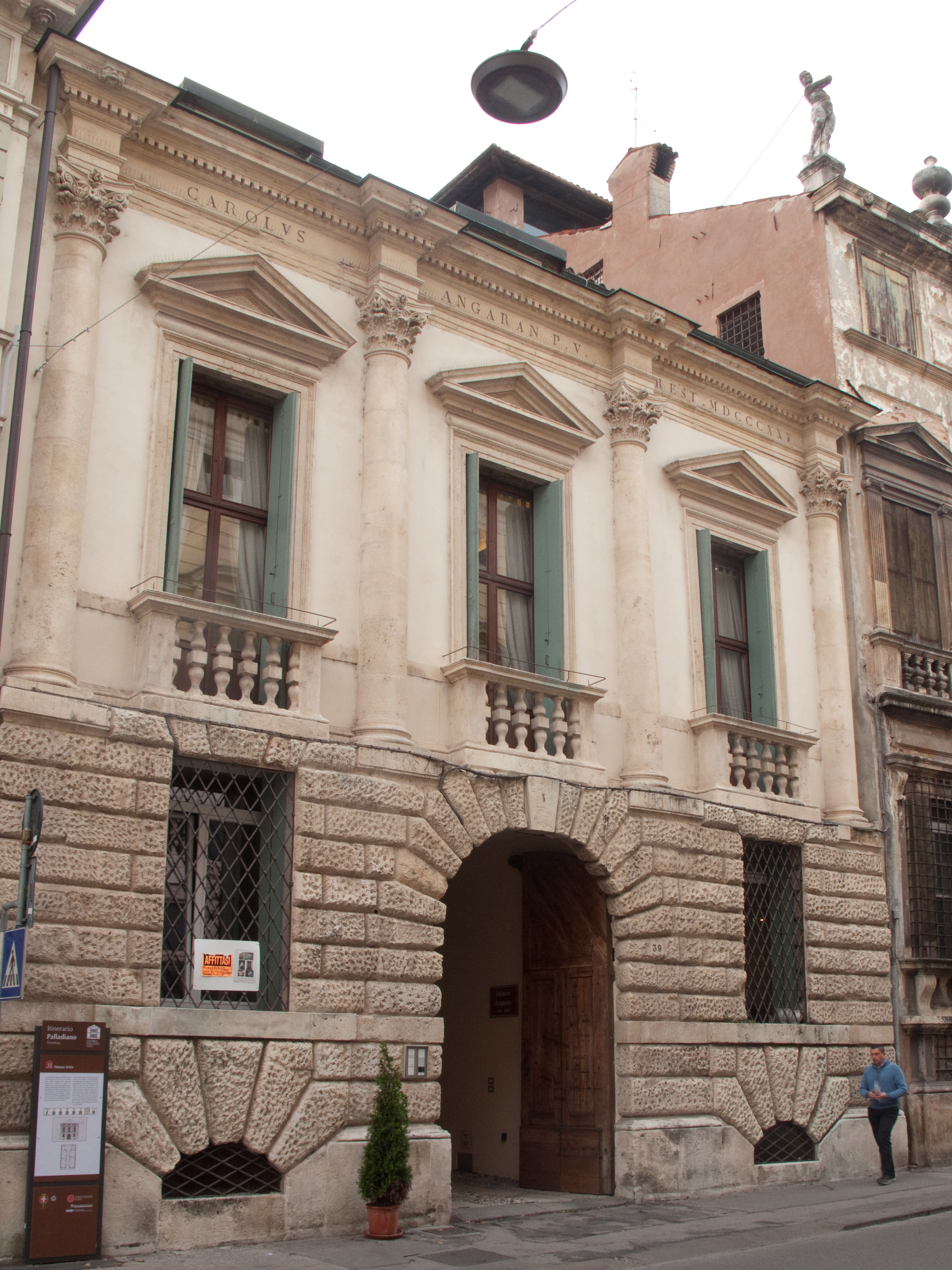
Schio Palace

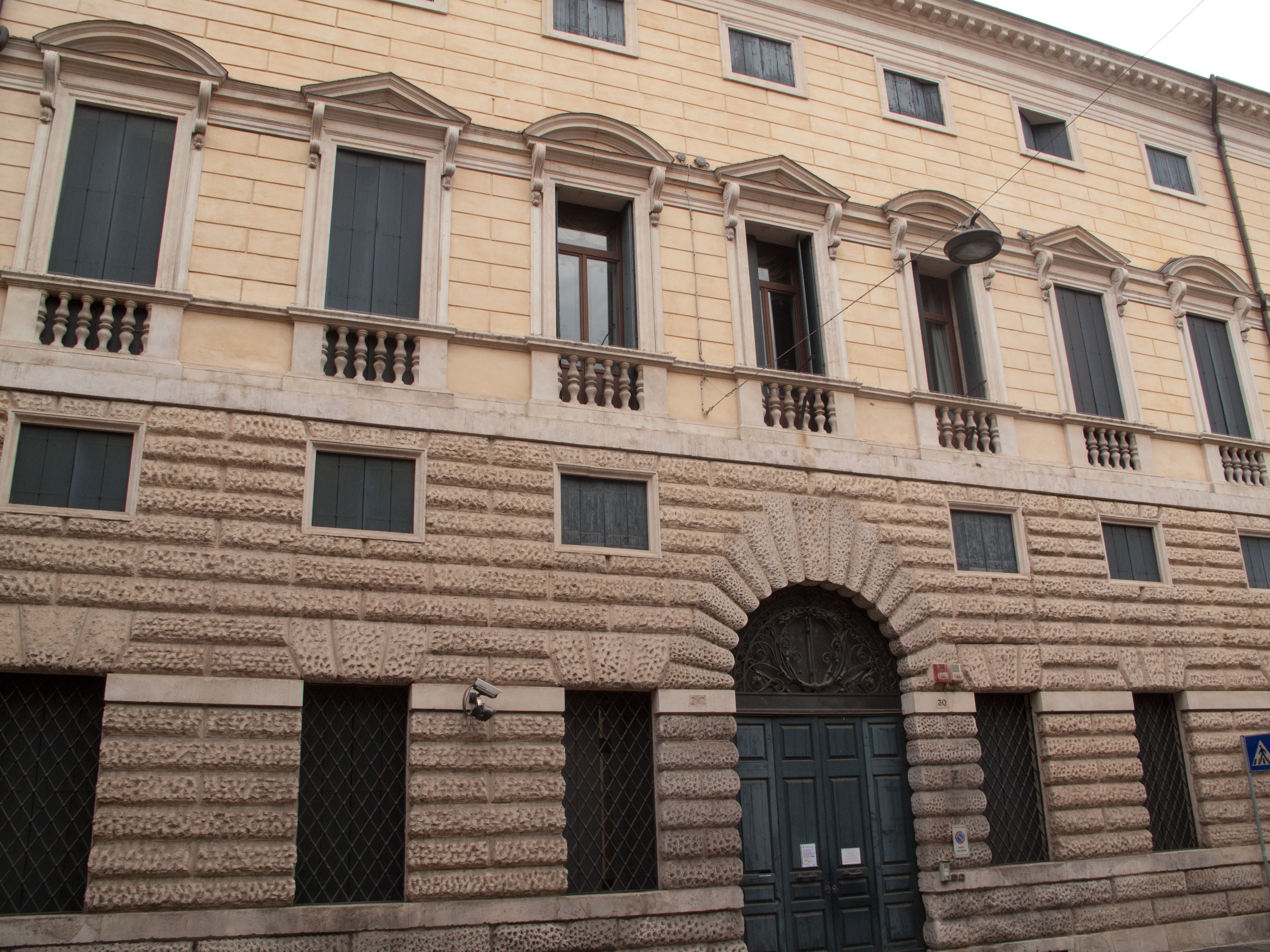
Franceschini Folco Palace

The area between the main road and the Astichello river was filled with proto-industrial activities, which exploited the energy produced by the river water - which flowed into the Bacchiglione with a drop of almost four meters - to operate the blades of the mills and other machines necessary for processing.

Along the river, factories were also set up for the production of woolen cloth, which required large quantities of water for processing and washing the fabrics. The survey of 1563-1564 recorded houses with dyeing and spinning mills within the Borgo, a fact documented in the drawings of the Pianta Angelica of 1580 and in that of the Monticolo of 1611, which show the looms with the chioare, that is, small hooked irons fixed in the looms of the wool factories, which were used to pin and stretch the fabric coming out of the fulling mills.

After the economic crisis of the 17th century, partly caused by the Dominante, the processing of wool was replaced by that of silk, which received the greatest boost from the Franceschini family. Their factory, then among the largest in Italy in terms of production and the size of its facilities, was frequently visited by Italians and foreigners. However, there were certainly other activities: the toponym Corte della Sega, in use until the 20th century, indicates the existence of a sawmill.

On the road, now safely inside a fortified wall, in addition to the modest houses of the artisans and the monasteries, noble palaces began to be built. Between 1560 and 1566, Count Bernardo Da Schio restructured his own palace based on a design by Andrea Palladio. Later, Livio Pagello, an orator and poet from Vicenza who lived in the second half of the 16th century, had his palace built, which still has the original late 16th century layout typical of the Veneto region.

As evidence of the fact that in the 16th century Borgo Pusterla was becoming an area of noble estates, some writings report that, in Contrà della Misericordia, the canon Gerolamo Gualdo had a beautiful palace; inherited from his father who had it built, he had enlarged it and above all he had created a fabulous garden, where the loggias had been frescoed by Bartolomeo Montagna and other artists of the time, it had a fountain in the center, 13 meters high, and statues and archaeological artifacts almost everywhere, some of which came from the ancient Roman theater of Berga. The palace was also home to the Accademia dei Costanti, a group of aristocrats dedicated to cultural activities, promoted by Gualdo. In the 18th century the art collection was divided among Gualdo's various heirs and the palace was later demolished.

In the 17th century, the architect Antonio Pizzocaro designed the palace that was commissioned by the Giustiniani family, who had recently arrived in Vicenza, in Contrà San Francesco. The palace was completed in 1656. Between 1676 and 1680, the Vicenza architect Carlo Borella designed the Barbieri palace.

In the second half of the 18th century, the silk-weavers Girolamo and Giovanni Franceschini commissioned the architect Ottavio Bertotti Scamozzi to design a building for residential and office use, annexed to the spinning mill that overlooked the Astichello canal. Following the rapid economic decline of the company, caused by the Napoleonic wars, Giovanni Franceschini was forced to sell everything to Francesco Folco di Schio - married to the Venetian Matilde Priuli-Zambelli, hence the palace became known as Franceschini Folco Zambelli - who completed the building in 1806, embellishing it with frescoes and decorations.

=== Contemporary era ===
==== Reorganization of the Church ====
With the Napoleonic law of April 25, 1810, all the convents in the city were suppressed, including the convent and church of the Discalced Carmelites, whose buildings were transferred to the Royal Treasury. In the same year the parishioners asked and obtained permission to exchange the old and dilapidated church of San Marco near the Pusterla bridge with that of the Scalzi, which in the meantime had been used as a tobacco warehouse and which became the new parish church with the title of San Marco in San Girolamo. The reorganized parish included the churches of San Bartolomeo, Santa Maria della Misericordia, San Francesco Nuovo (formerly of the Poor Clares) and Santa Maria Maddalena delle Convertite. Outside the town, in the Pusterla area, the churches of San Giovanni Battista a Laghetto, Sant'Antonino (built in the early 18th century on land belonging to the Pagello family who had their residence in San Francesco) and San Martino al ponte del Marchese, churches that - apart from Sant'Antonio - in the previous ecclesiastical organization were subject to the church of Santa Maria Etiopissa.

The old church of San Marco was demolished in 1814 and the area on which it stood was sold by the Amortization Fund to the Roi family; the parsonage that stood next to it was purchased in 1927 by the Roi marquises, who in exchange assigned another larger and more comfortable house they owned, the Pagello palace in Contra' San Francesco, as the parish priest's residence.

The same Napoleonic law of April 1810 also closed the monastery of San Francesco, of the Observant Poor Clares. Still flourishing at the beginning of the 18th century - at that time it had over 70 nuns - it had declined considerably by the end of the century. The buildings became municipal property and were turned into barracks: what remained was incorporated into the current elementary school building in 1928. The church - which contained valuable paintings and frescoes by Marcello Fogolino and Giovanni Speranza - was emptied of its contents and deconsecrated.

The dissolved religious orders never returned to the town. However, in 1837, during the Kingdom of Lombardy-Venetia and by the will of Emperor Francis I of Austria, who appreciated their work, the English Ladies took possession of the part of the convent that had previously belonged to the Carmelites. There, overcoming continuous adversity over time and also opposition from the city authorities, they have been conducting educational activities ever since. From the mid-nineteenth century onwards, the Sisters of St. Dorothy were present in the civil hospital of San Bortolo, dedicating themselves both to welfare activities and, from the beginning of the twentieth century, to the management of the nursing school.

In 1864, when Bishop Giovanni Antonio Farina made his pastoral visit, the parish of San Marco had about 1,500 inhabitants in 450 families.

==== The urban development of the Borgo ====
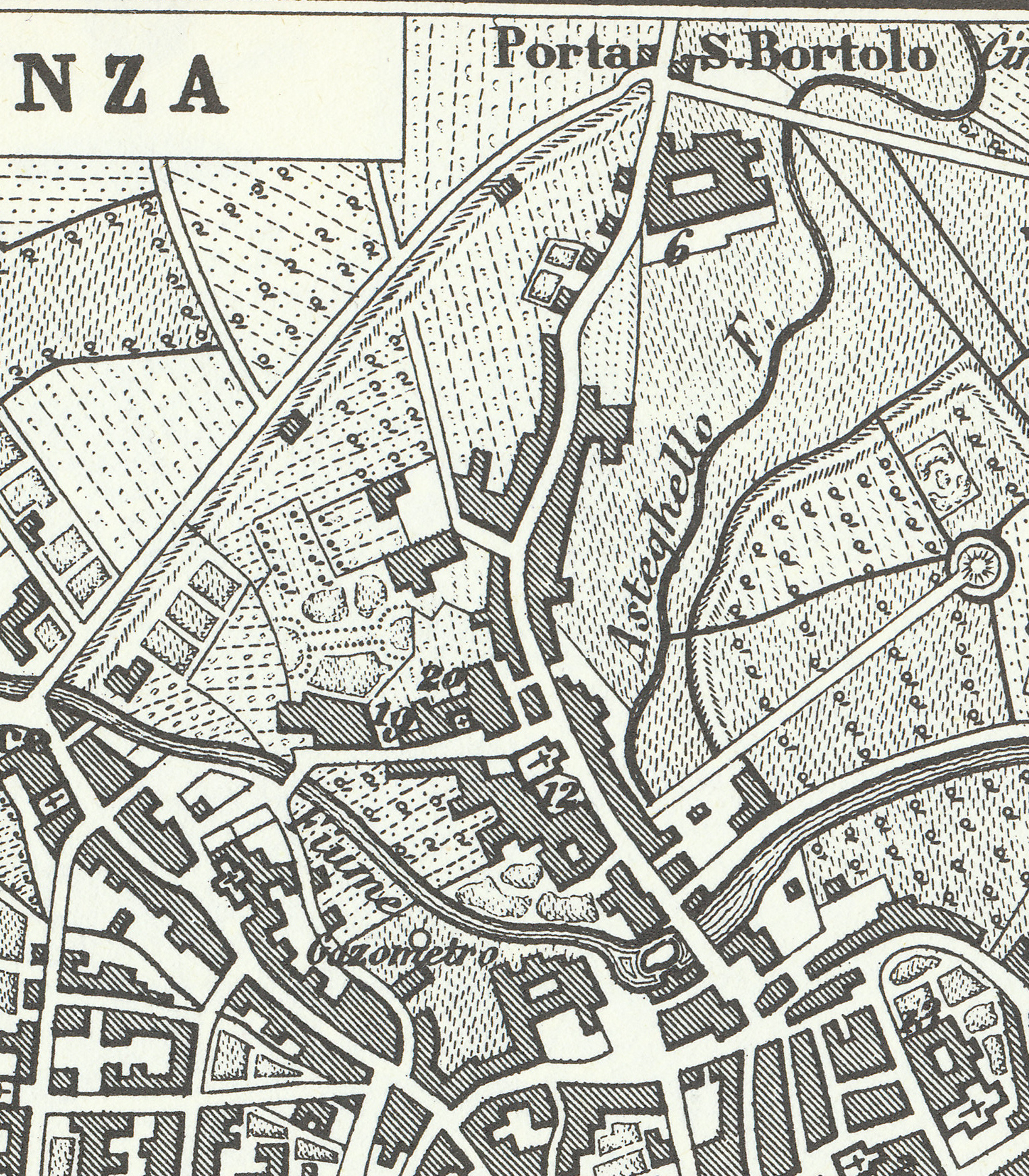
The map of Vicenza in the Vallardi Atlas of 1880 shows that at that time the whole area northwest of Contrà San Francesco and San Bortolo was almost devoid of buildings and cultivated.

In 1907, the Municipality purchased land in the north-eastern part of the Borgo to create a new district of public housing. The initial project, starting with the purchase of the former Zorzi areas, should have been supported, from both an entrepreneurial and financial point of view, by a joint public and private commitment, but in the end it was carried out by the Municipality alone, which bore the burden and entrusted the intervention to the municipal special agency. The project is considered the first qualified urban and building plan of the first half of the 20th century in Vicenza.

Occupying the entire vast area that goes from Contrà San Bortolo to Viale D'Alviano, a network of radial roads was created, converging on a new triangular square (the current Piazza Marconi); in 1909, 42 new homes were built and in 1911 another 8, while - lacking the support of private financiers - the social services envisaged by the project, such as the medical clinic, the children's home with after-school care and the women's workshop, were not realized. In addition to the internal roads, two new access roads to the main street of the Borgo were created by means of modest gutting of existing buildings.

A particular construction was the so-called “casermone” (large barracks). Designed by the engineer Nicolò Secco, it consisted of four residential blocks arranged around a large rectangular courtyard; it represented an innovative solution - even if based on the strict models of Habsburg culture - aimed at building public housing within the city, where it was necessary to make the best use of the land, which had become very expensive.

In 1911 the neighborhood was completed and the new streets were named after illustrious Italian scientists. A section of the ancient ring road - created by filling in the moat of the fortifications designed in the sixteenth century by Bartolomeo d'Alviano - was named after the condottiere and marked the modern boundary of the neighborhood.

During the twenty years of fascism, new council houses were built north of Viale D'Alviano: first, in the 1920s, the red houses outside Porta San Bortolo (the current San Bortolo neighborhood); later, in the mid-1930s, what was called the Savoy Neighborhood was moved further west, after the war it became the Neighborhood of the Unification of Italy and finally, after the creation of the parish, the San Paolo Neighborhood.

In July 1940, following a decision by the mayor, Contrà San Marco was re-dedicated to the fascist quadrumvir Italo Balbo, with the justification that “while the name San Marco did not derive its origins from any particular event of national historical interest, simply from the fact that one of the city's seven chapels existed there, the district was home to the Italian Fasces of Combat, the driving force behind political activity in Vicenza” (this was the Palazzo Folco Franceschini, the largest Casa del Fascio in Italy during the twenty-year period of Fascism). In December 1945 the Municipal Council of the CLN (National Liberation Committee) abolished this place name and restored the previous one.

== Important places ==
=== Churches and monasteries ===
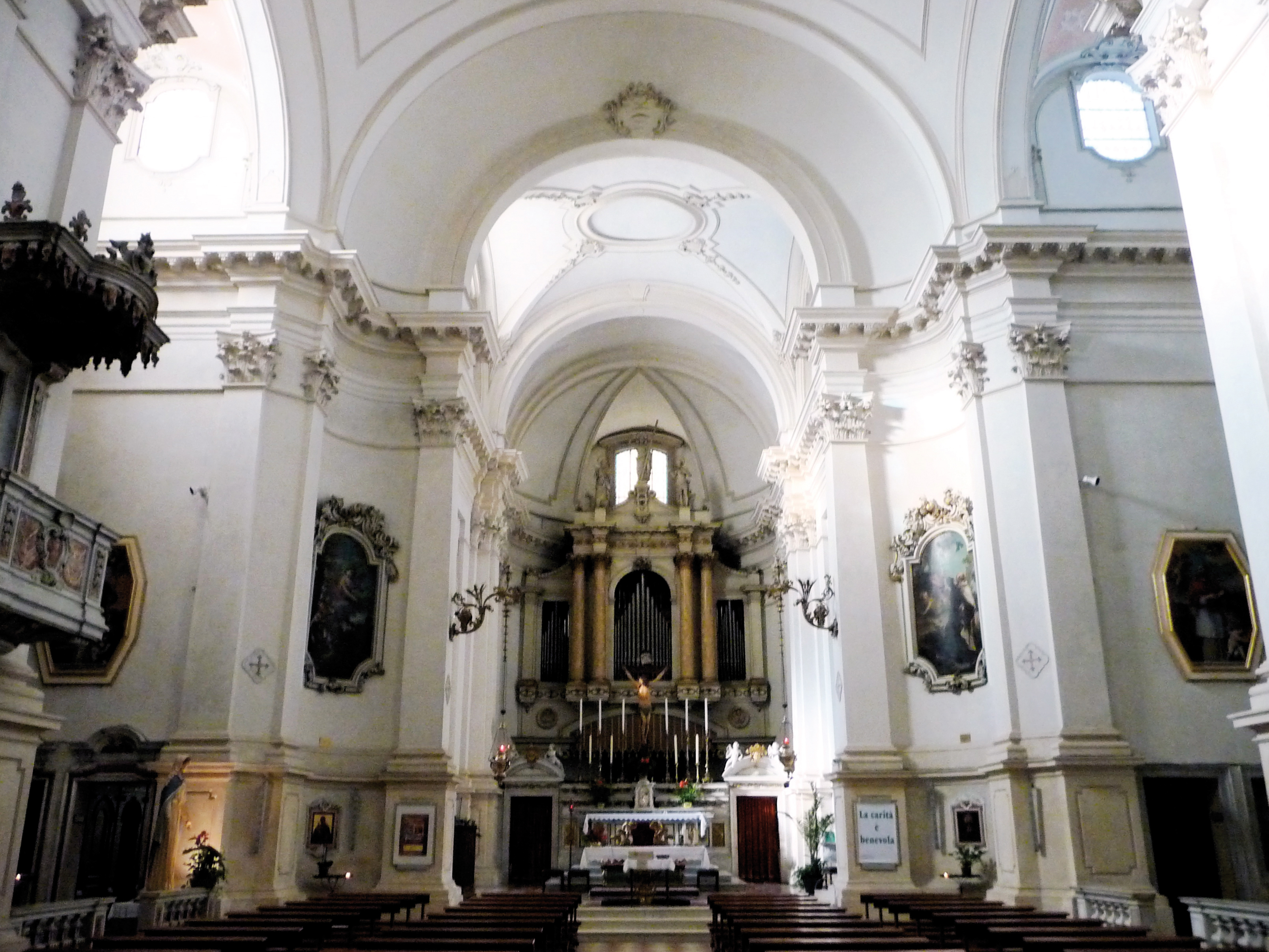
Nave of the Church of San Marco in San Girolamo (once San Girolamo degli Scalzi)

Only a part of the historic religious buildings are still used for these purposes or open for worship.

The most important is the Church of San Marco in San Girolamo, currently the parish church. This baroque building houses various works by early 18th-century Venetian artists and a sacristy with original inlaid furnishings.

The Chiesa della Misericordia (Church of Mercy) was partially restored at the beginning of the 21st century and granted to the Serbian Orthodox community (parish of San Luca), who use it for their services. It has a façade with simple but beautiful classical forms; it has a single nave with five altars and contains some valuable sculptures and paintings, including a canvas by Alessandro Maganza. The convent with the cloister, almost contemporary, has been transformed into a large residential condominium complex, with an entrance in Contrà Paolo Sarpi.

Of San Bartolomeo only the apse of the church and the ancient cloister remain, in its 15th and 19th century reconstructions, both within the area of the civil hospital.

The church and convent of Santa Maria Maddalena or delle Convertite, located near the Ponte Novo, have been transformed into private buildings; the façade of the small church of Santa Maddalena is still visible from Contra' della Misericordia. The small church of San Francesco, built in the area of the convent of San Francesco Nuovo (which after its suppression was transformed into a school for officers in the 19th century, then into a primary school), was deconsecrated and transformed into a gymnasium, and was used until the 2000s by the state primary school “Luigi da Porto”.

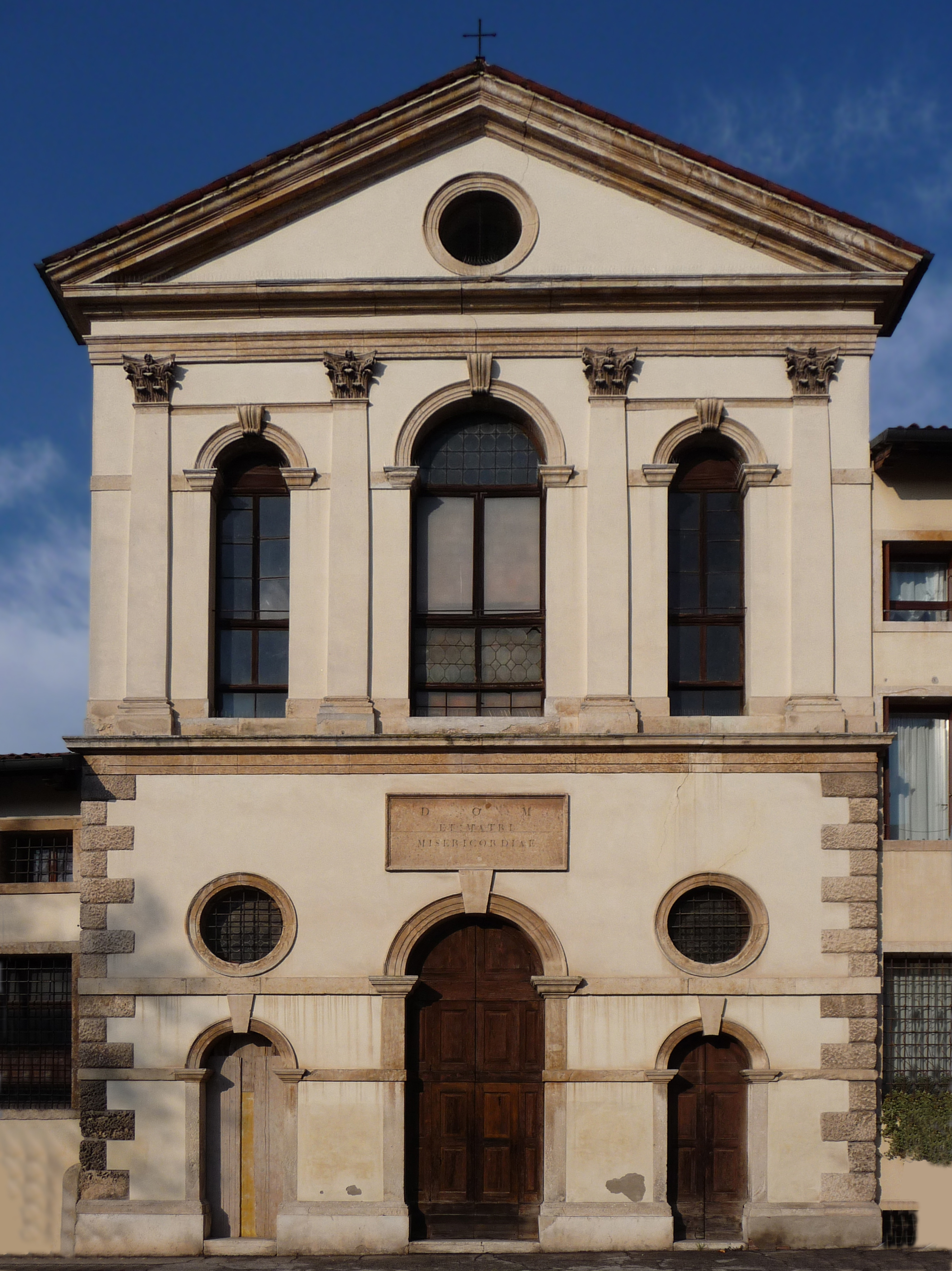
Façade of the Church of Mercy

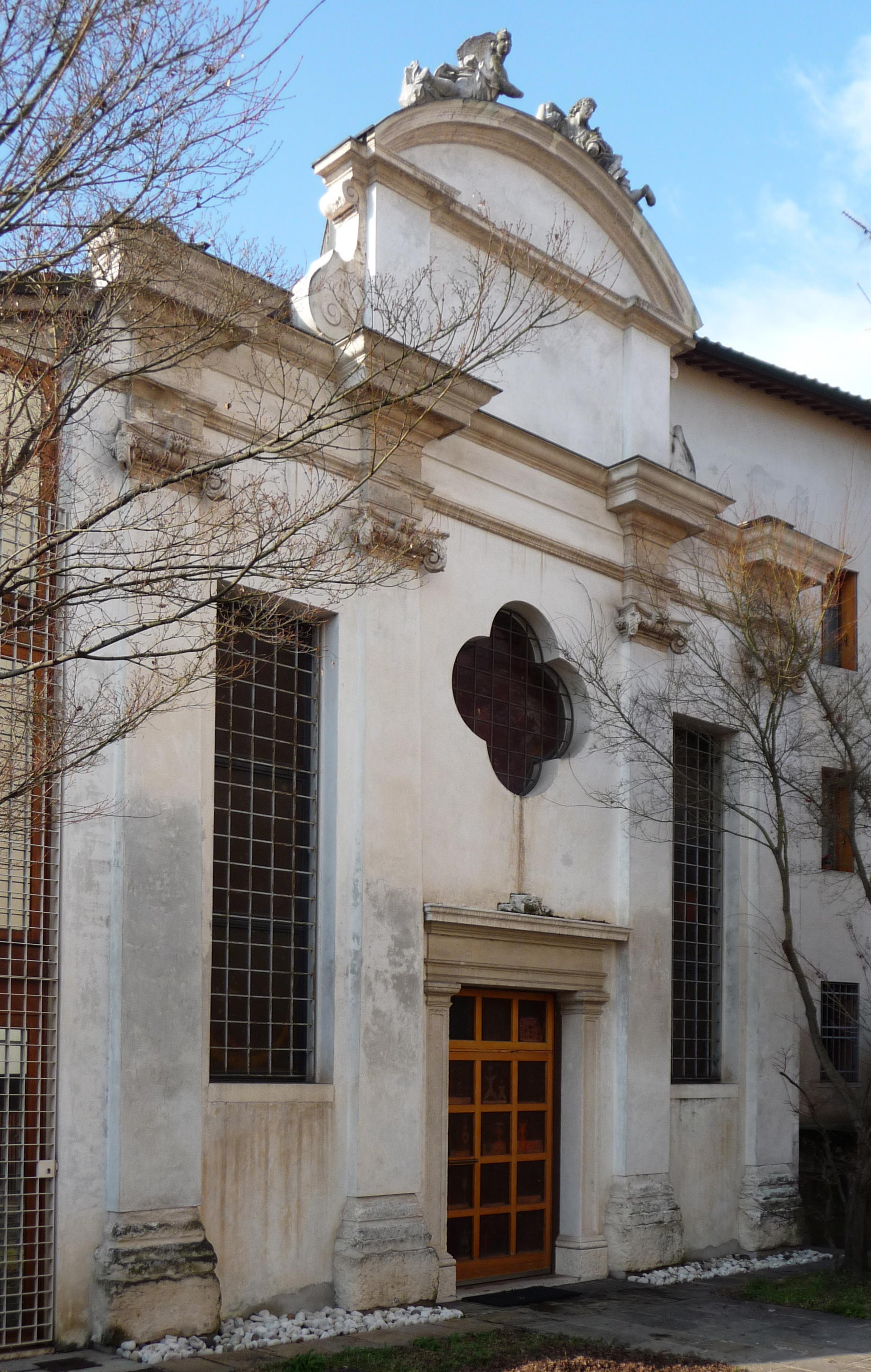
Façade of the former church of Santa Maria Maddalena or delle Convertite

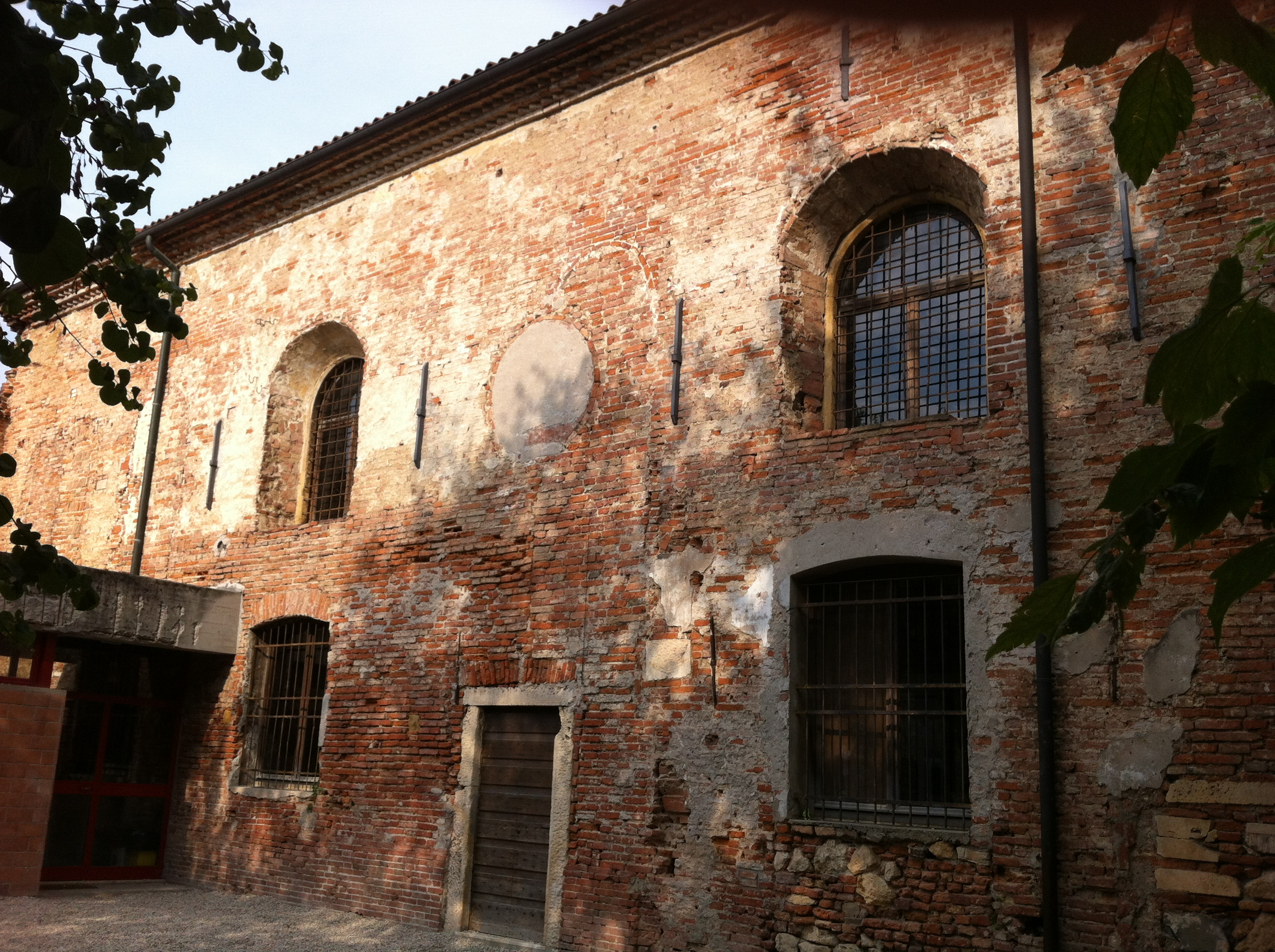
Remains of the church belonging to the convent of San Francesco Nuovo

=== Bridges ===
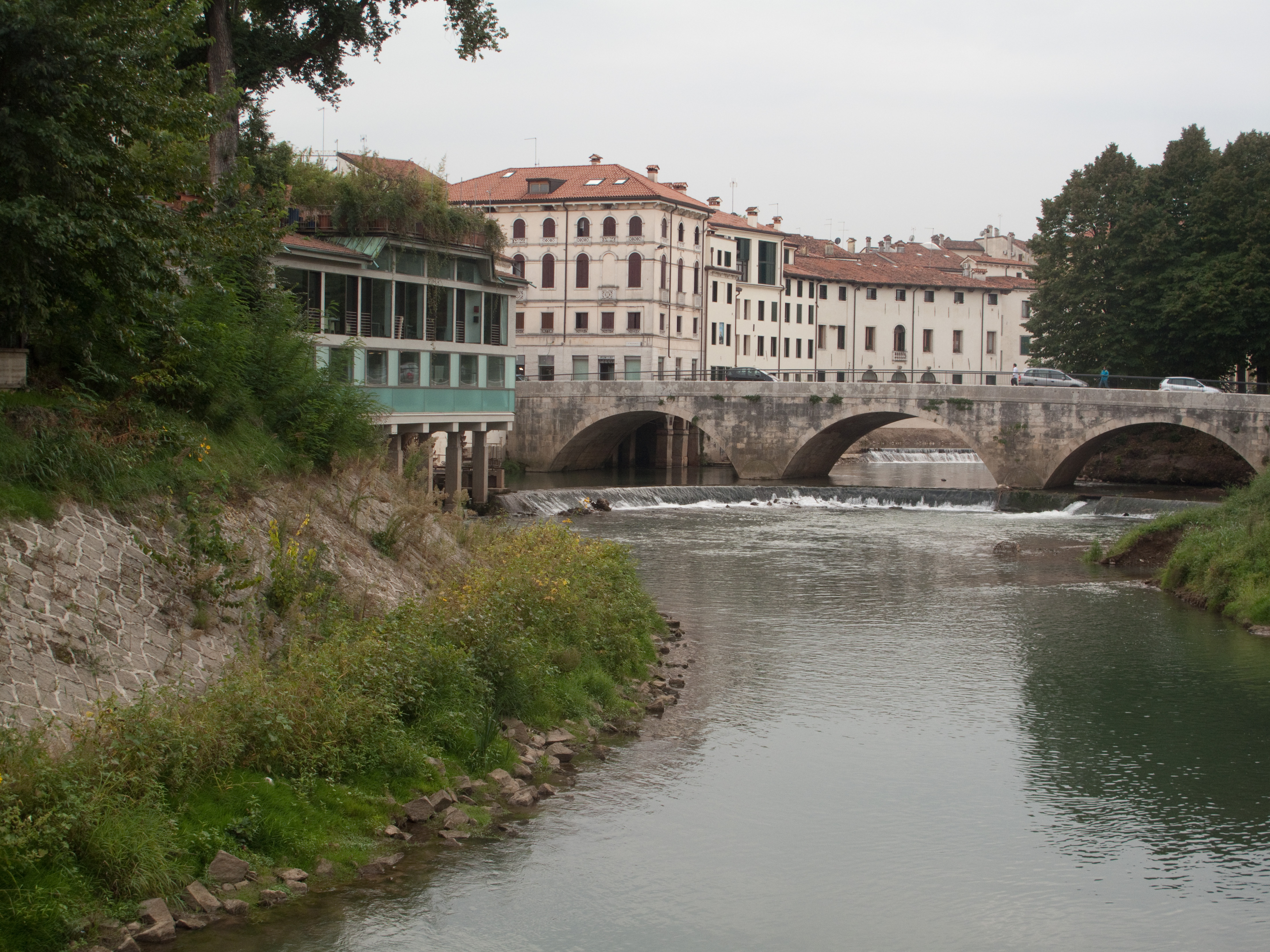
Pusterla bridge over the Bacchiglione river

The Pusterla bridge, made of stone since 1231, restored in 1444 and 1640, widened in 1928 to meet increased traffic demands, was consolidated in 2011-12, after being damaged by the flood of November 1, 2010.

The first construction of the Ponte Novo dates back to the 14th century. It was originally made of wood and rebuilt in stone in the years 1645-48. In the age of the Serenissima it was called the Ponte di Santa Maria Maddalena or Ponte delle Convertite, because it led to the church and its convent. It has a history of constant collapses, even after its construction in stone, because it is located near a bend in the Bacchiglione, which becomes particularly impetuous during floods. It was called Ponte Novo after the reconstruction of 1793. After remaining unsafe for many years, it was rebuilt in iron with a single arch and completely reconstructed at the beginning of the 21st century.

=== Palaces ===
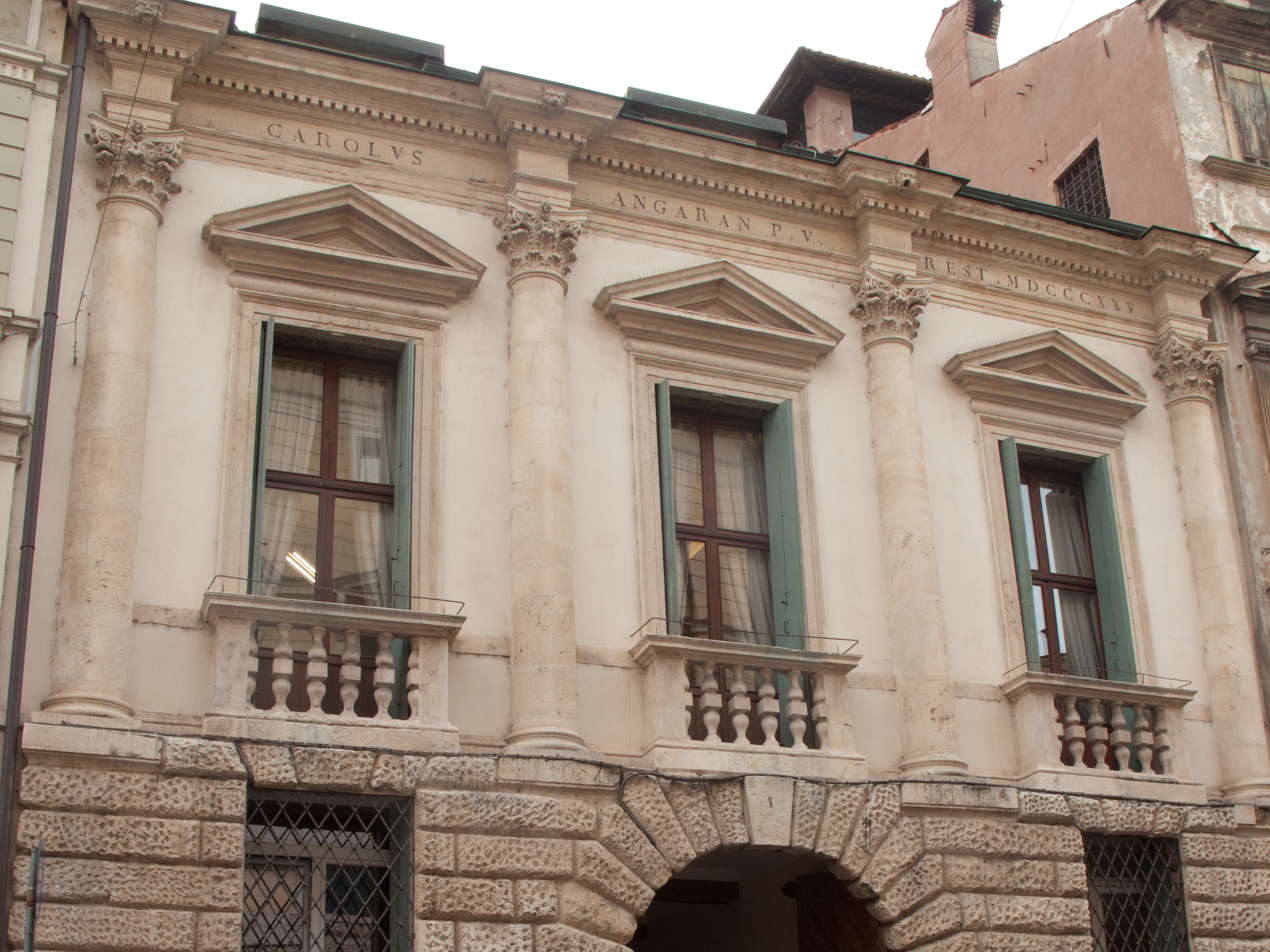
Schio Palace, main floor

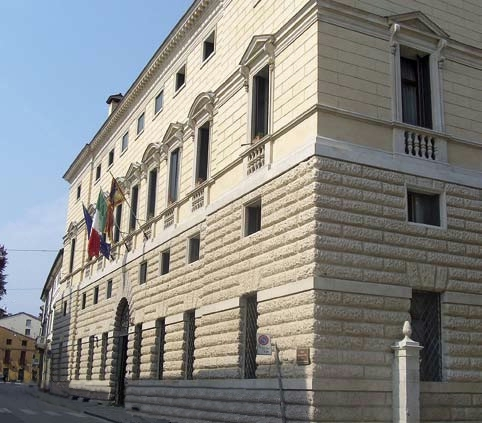
Franceschini Folco Palace

Along the main street there is a succession of elegant and refined palaces from various periods.

In Contrà San Marco, on the right - facing the Pusterla bridge:

- the Vaccari Berton house (Emiliano palace), at no. 4, attributed to Tommaso da Lugano at the beginning of the 16th century
- the 18th century Franceschini Folco palace, at no. 30, a building of imposing proportions with rusticated brick on the ground floor and mezzanine and the main floor with narrow neoclassical architraved windows, a masterpiece of “beauty created through rationality by successive reductions, elimination of orders and decorative elements” by Ottavio Bertotti Scamozzi
- the long and unadorned, but originally frescoed, Capra Querini palace at numbers 36-38. Behind the palace, after crossing a stone bridge over the Astichello, is the Querini park, which was once the palace garden. It became the property of the Rezzara family, and was opened to the public in 1971 after a long dispute over its use. The City of Vicenza chose to preserve the park and reached an agreement for its transfer.
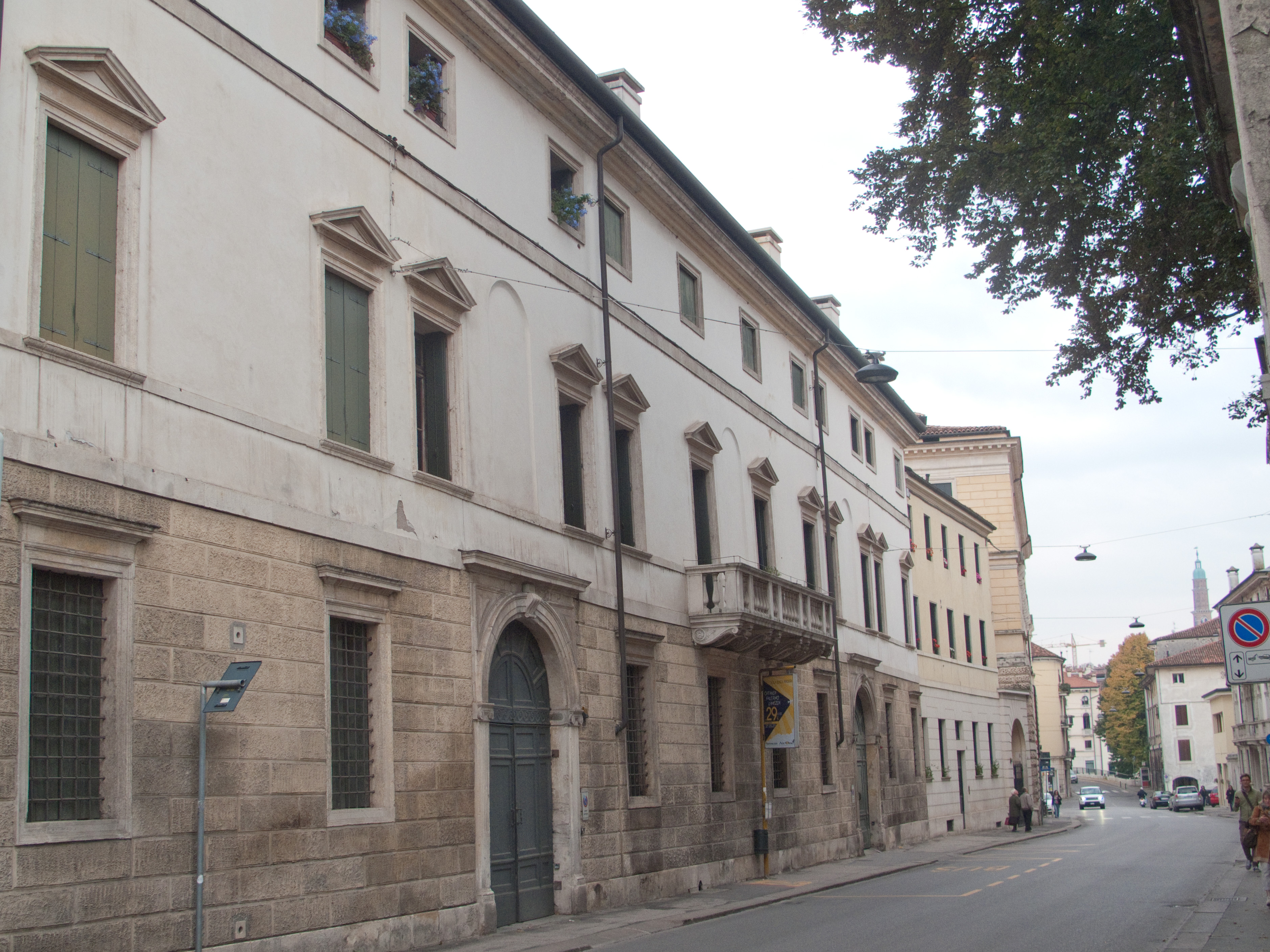
Palazzo Capra Querini, facade

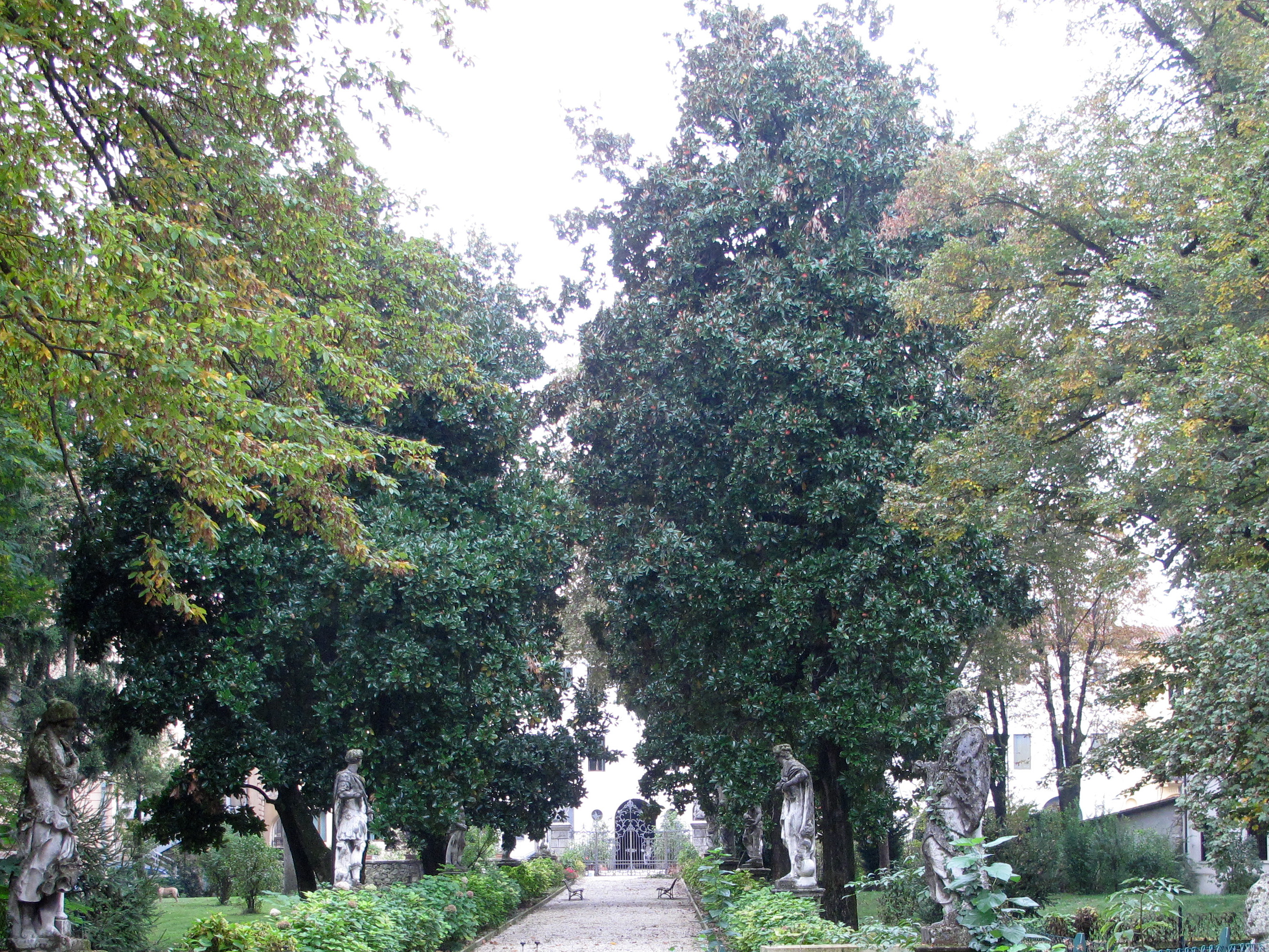
Palazzo Capra Querini, back with the avenue that connected Querini Park to the palace

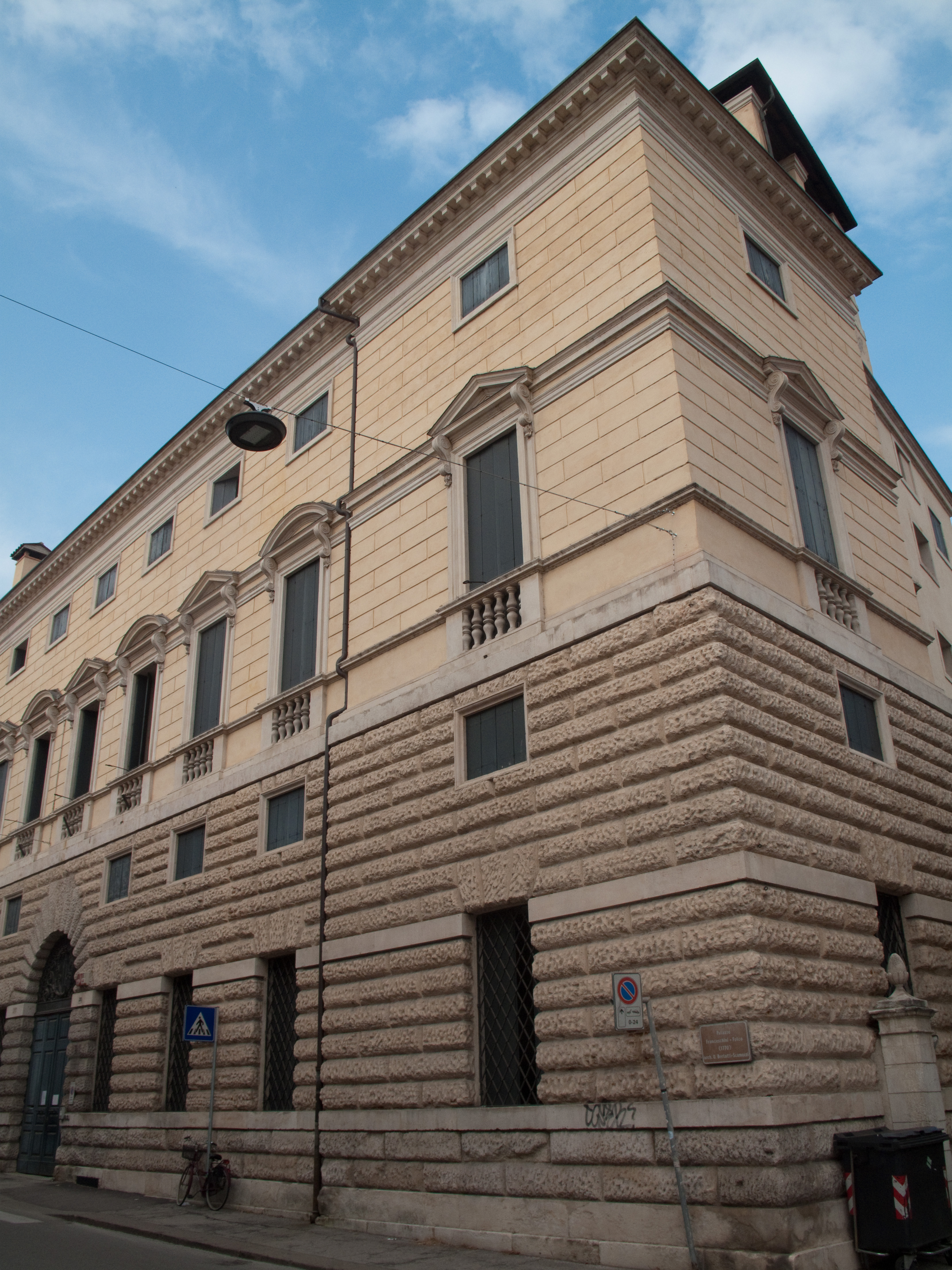
Palazzo Franceschini

On the left of Contrà San Marco:

- the Stecchini Nussi palace, built between 1620 and 1630, attributed to Ottavio Bruto Revese, and later owned by the diocese of Vicenza, which used it as a boarding school for students and for the assistants of the Catholic Action; it has a peculiar island-shaped garden in a bend of the river.
- the eclectic Palazzo Roi at no. 37
- the Palladian Palazzo Schio Vaccari Lioy, at no. 39, is characterized by the rustic ashlar that surrounds the ground floor; the radial layout around the entrance arch and the openings that illuminate the cellars was used by later Vicenza architects, such as Ottavio Bruto Revese. The piano nobile is punctuated by four Corinthian half-columns and three windows crowned by triangular pediments. Behind the palace, a garden reaches the bank of the Bacchiglione. The interior - much modified over time - has a symmetrical layout, with a passing hall, according to a typical pattern of Venetian palaces.
- the 17th century Palazzo Barbieri Vajenti Piovene Cicogna, at no. 41, with its entrance door surmounted by an ornate baroque balcony between neoclassical windows.
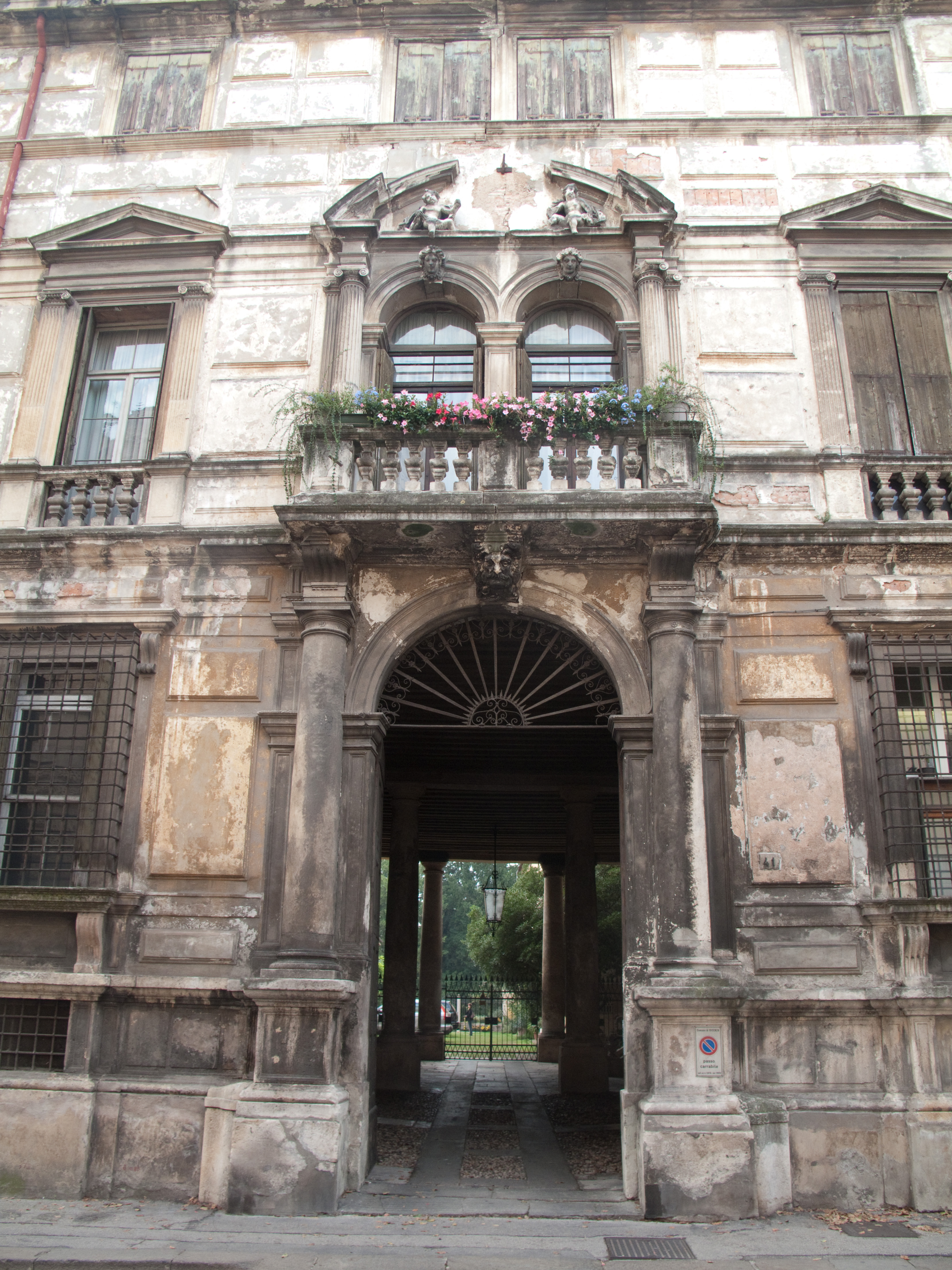
Palazzo Barbieri, facade

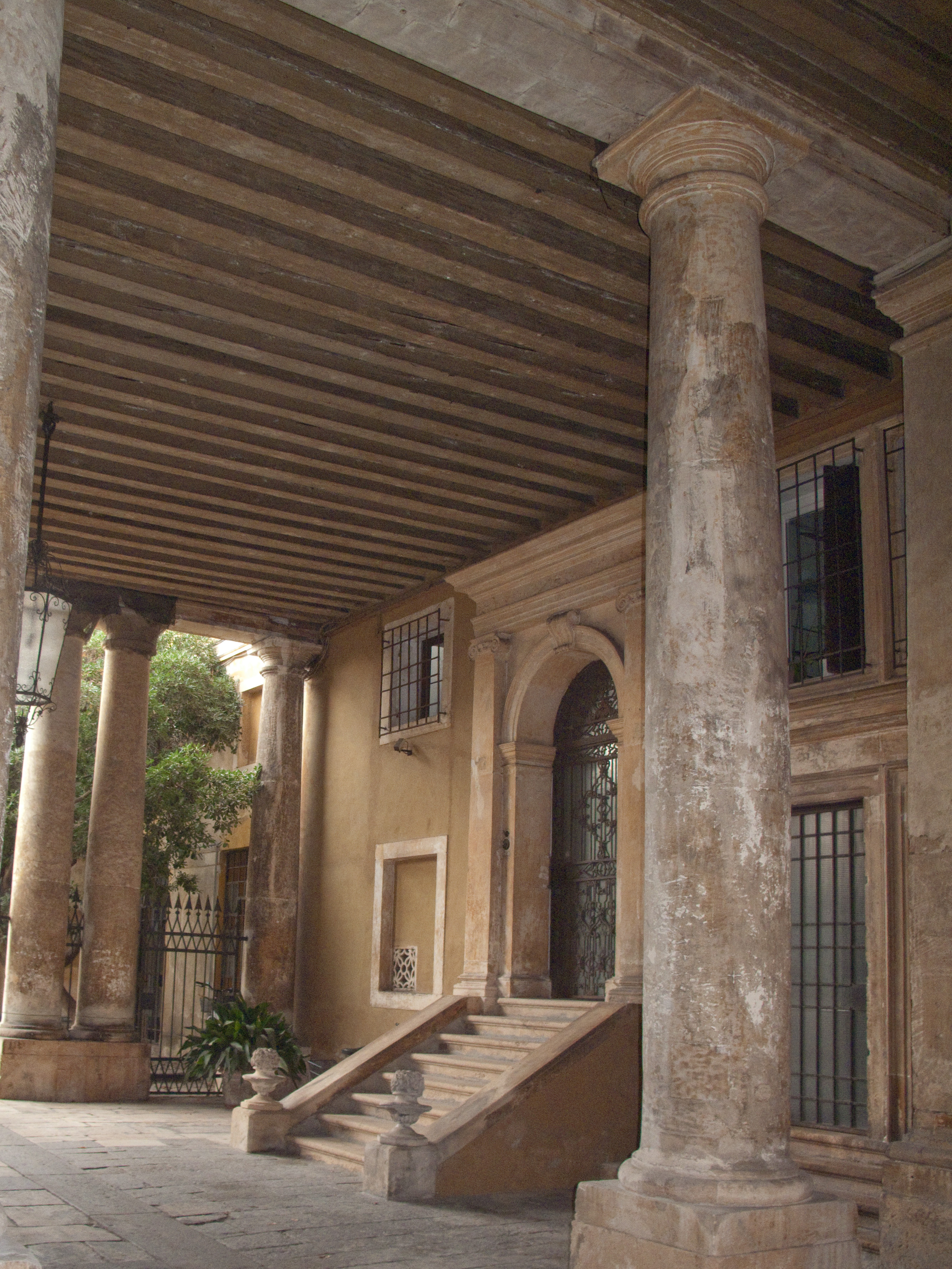
Palazzo Barbieri, atrium

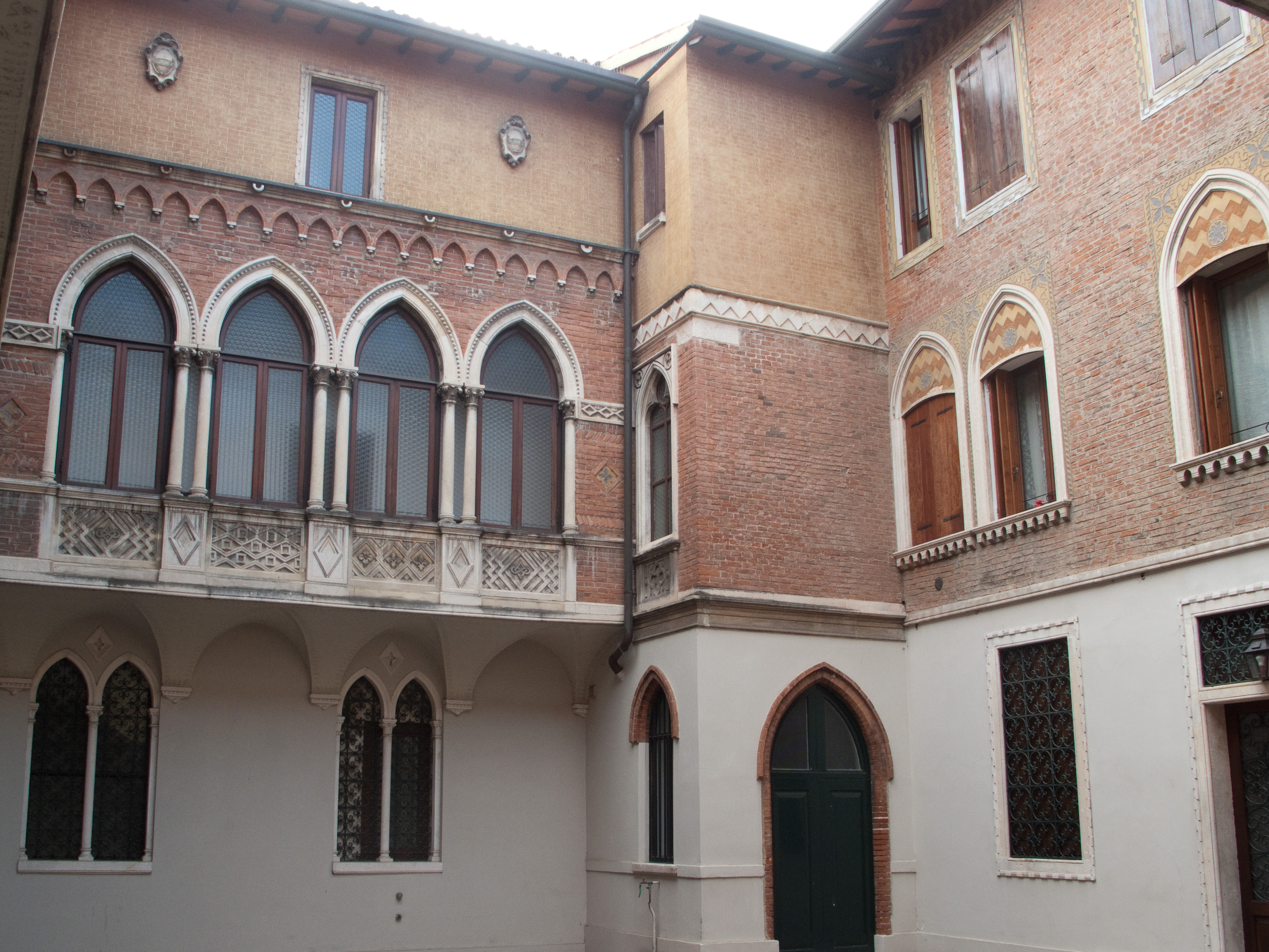
Palazzo Roi, courtyard

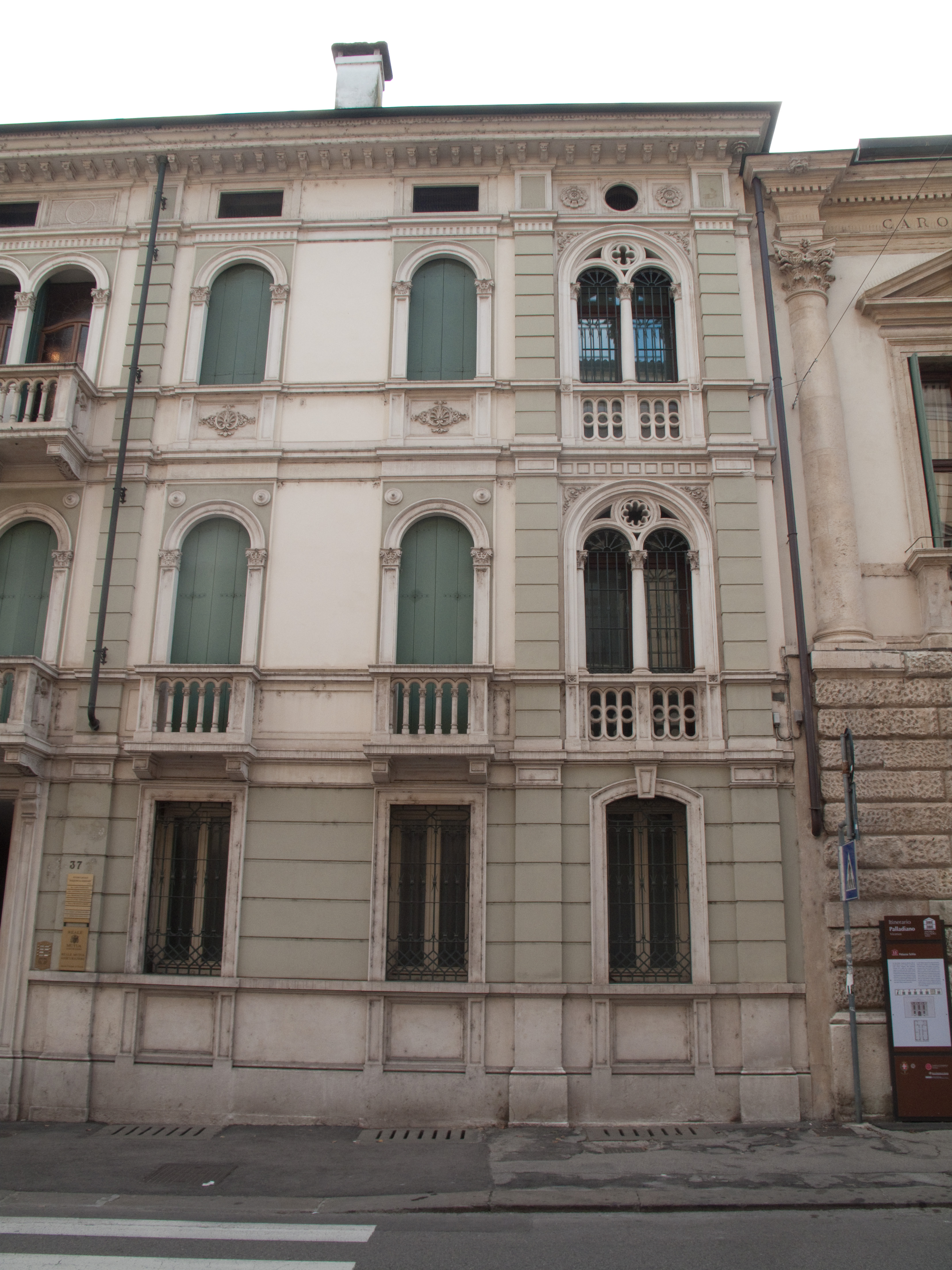
Palazzo Roi

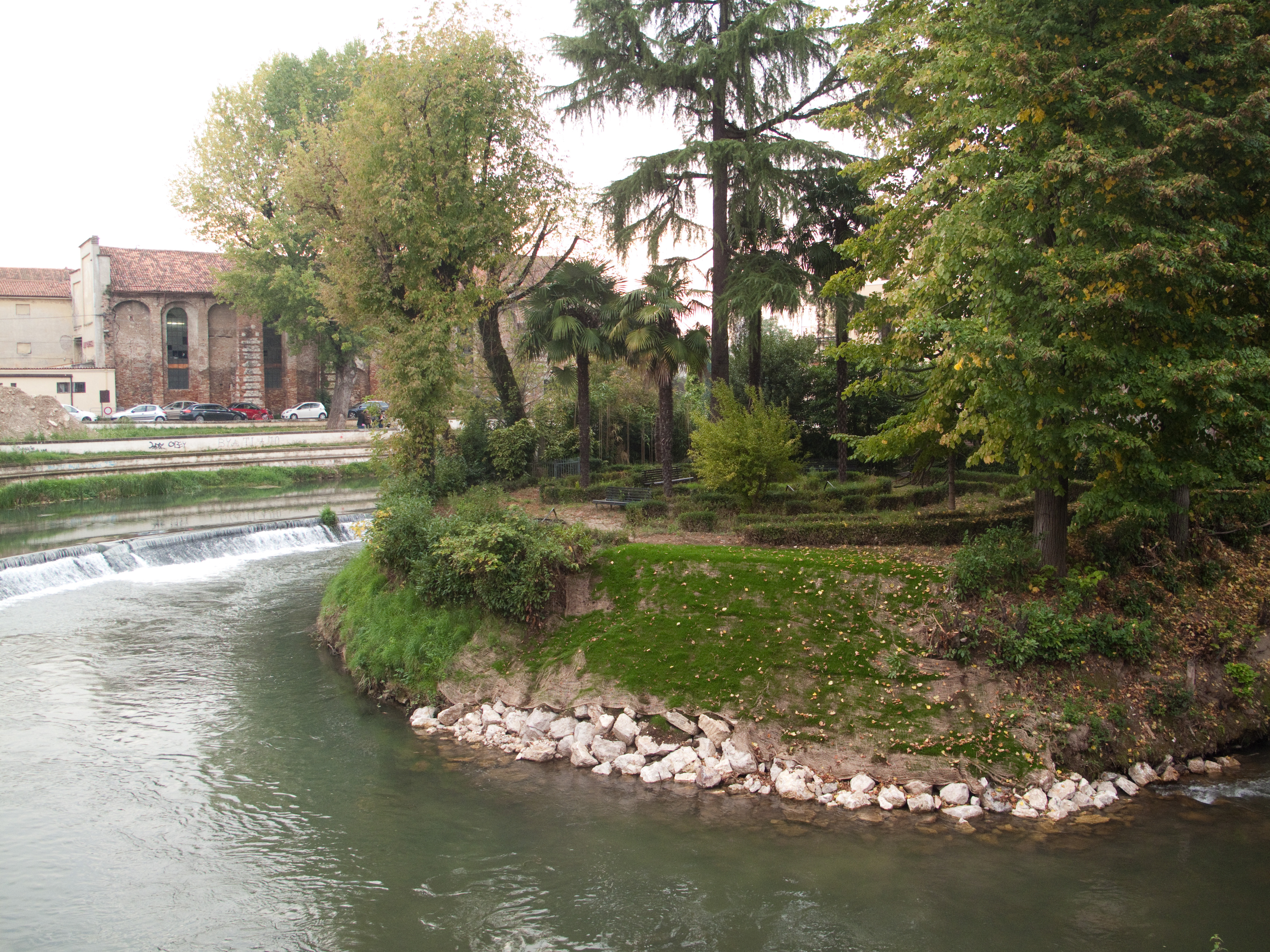
Palazzo Stecchini, island garden

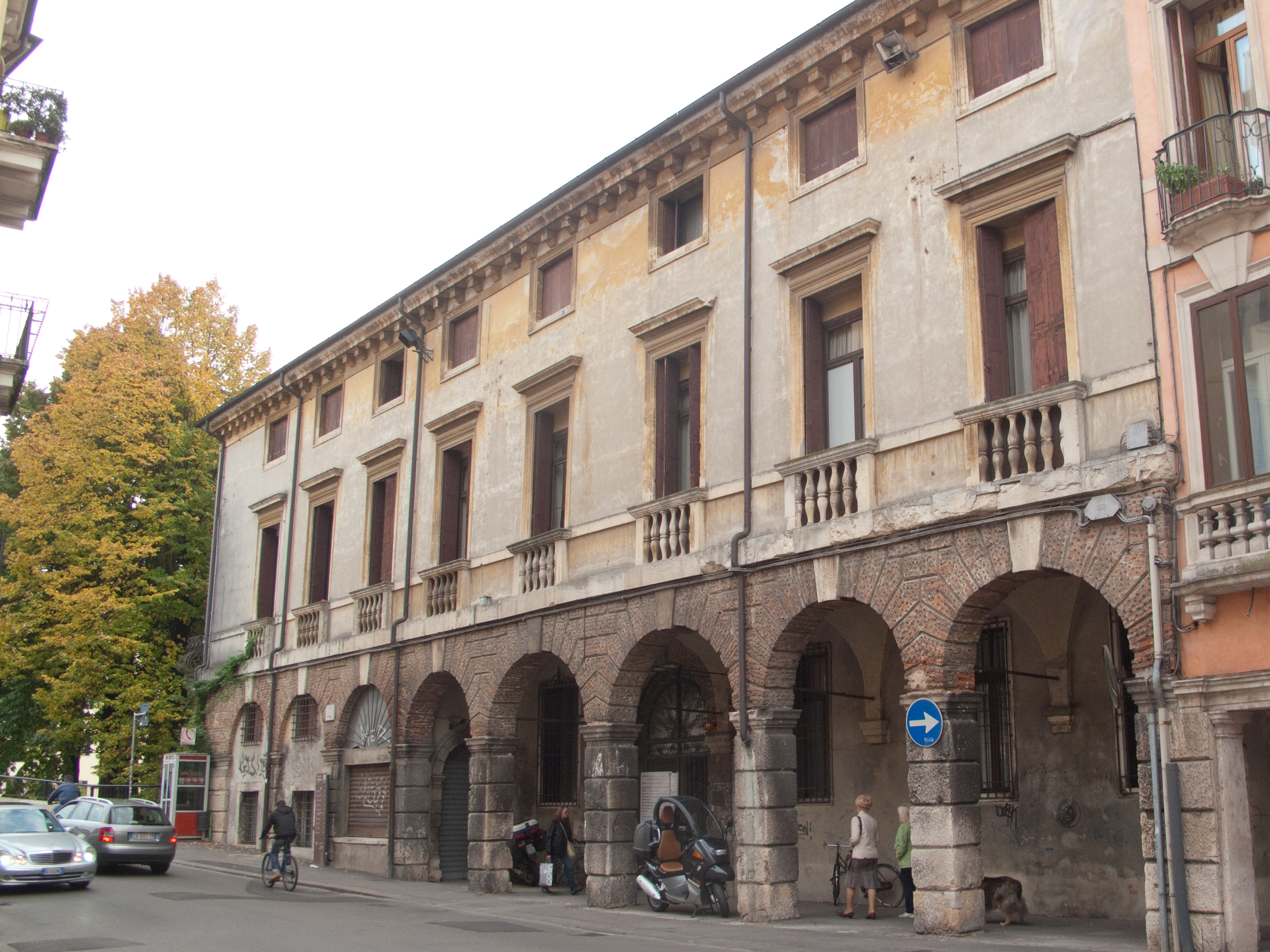
Palazzo Stecchini

Continuing along Contrà San Francesco:

- Palazzo Giustiniani Baggio, at number 41. Inhabited by the Giustiniani family until the extinction of the Vicenza branch in 1812, it was inherited by the Zorzi Giustiniani descendants, who sold it at the beginning of the 20th century to Marco Baggio, director of the college of the same name. After being used as a dormitory for students of the Alessandro Rossi Technical Institute, the building became the Vicenza Civil Hospital and was finally purchased by the Cariverona Foundation, which completed its restoration in 2011.
- Palazzo Pagello, at no. 78. The original building, dating from the late 16th century and in typical Venetian style, has been enlarged and altered over time. The entrance, in the center of the symmetrical facade, is emphasized on the first floor by a small balcony and an opening with imposts and a shaped stone arch. Probably during the 17th century, two lateral wings were added to this first nucleus, lower than the central body, but with the same characteristics as the main building. Since the end of the 1920s, the building has been the rectory of the parish of San Marco. The arch on the right leads to a porticoed vestibule, with exposed beams painted with stylized floral motifs, which gives access to the courtyard where the Parish Sports and Recreation Center and the San Marco Cinema Theater are located.
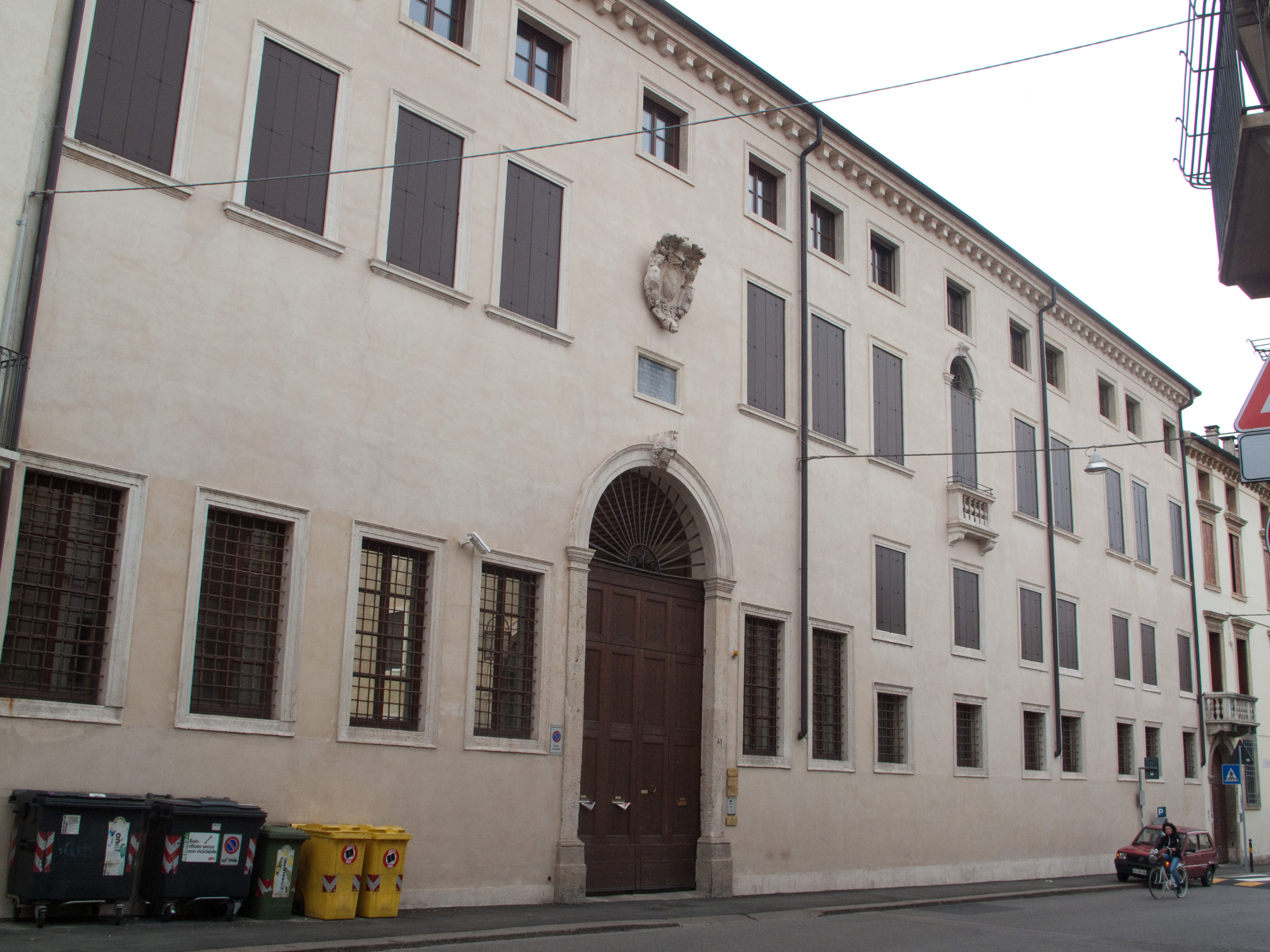
Palazzo Giustiniani Baggio, facade

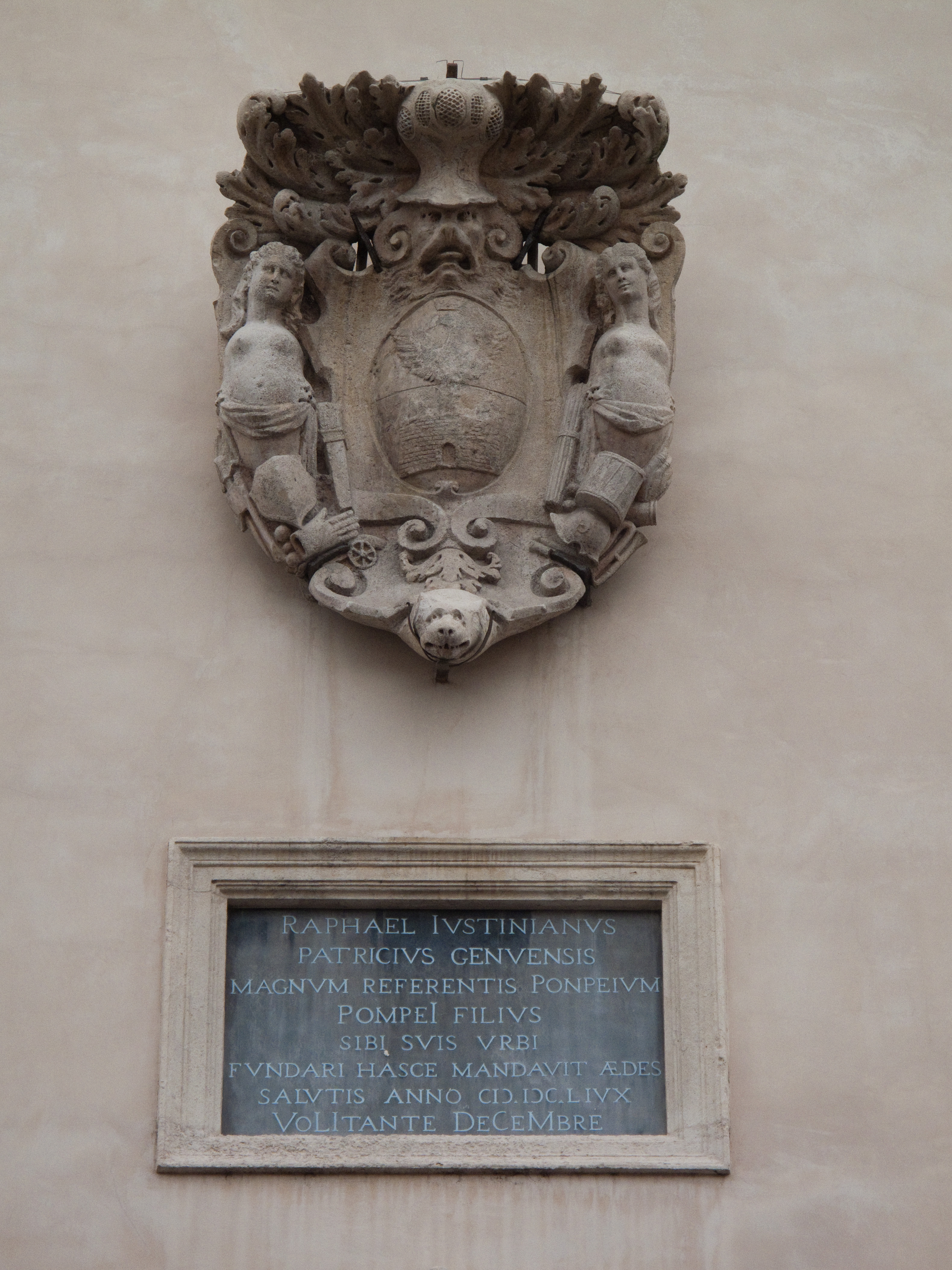
Palazzo Giustiniani Baggio, coat of arms

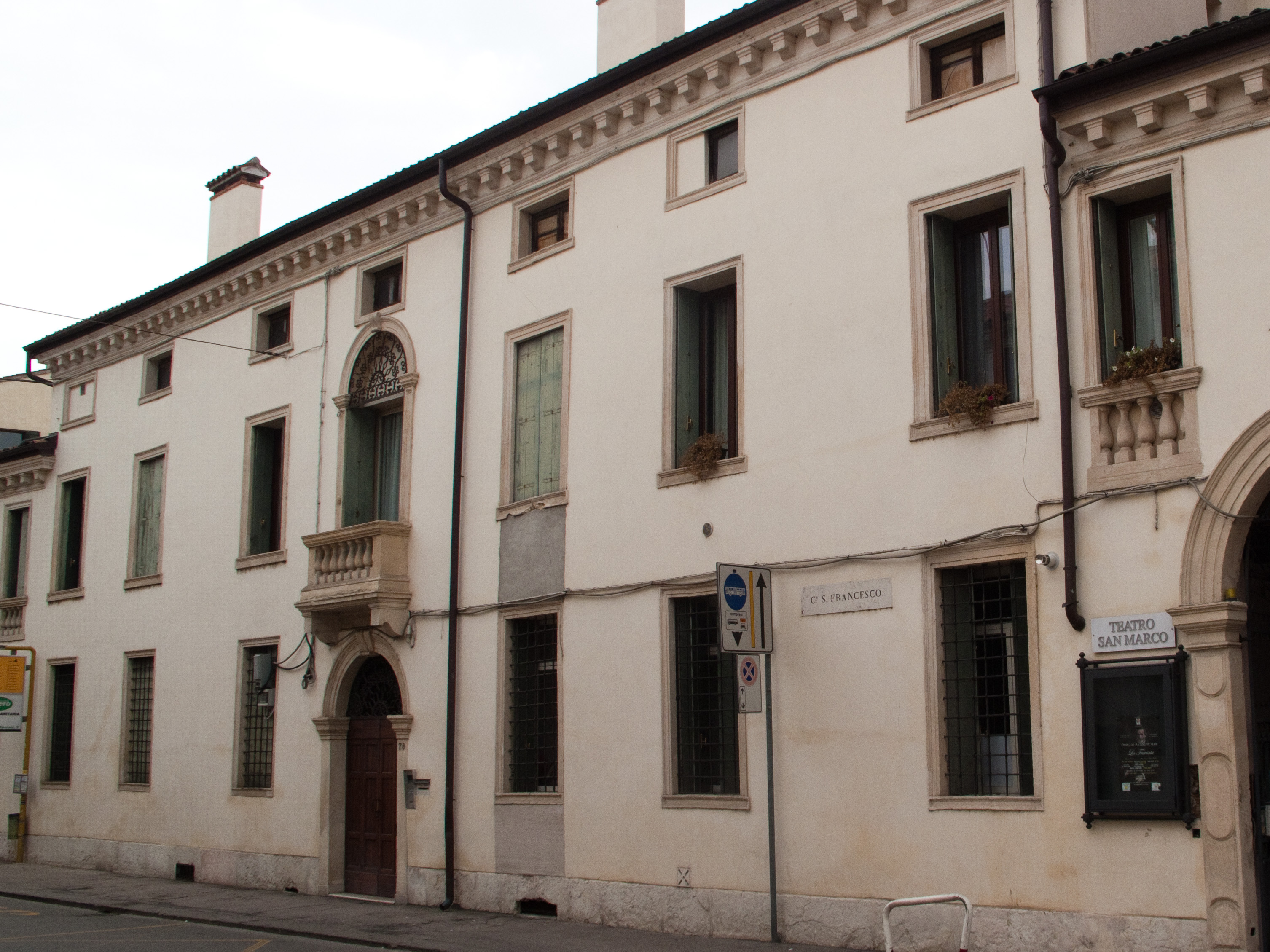
Palazzo Pagello, facade

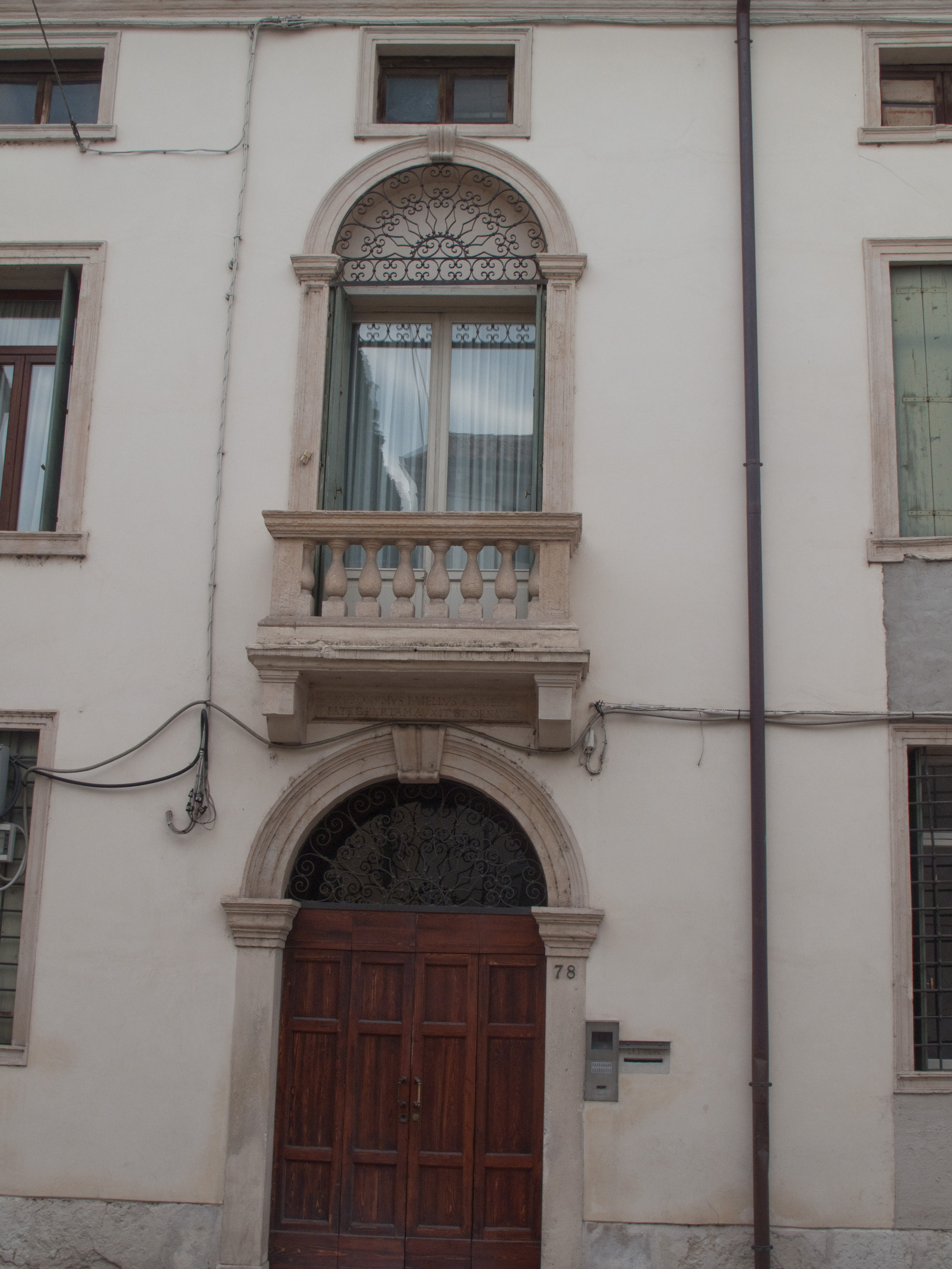
Palazzo Pagello, entrance

== See also ==
- Discalced Carmelites
- San Marco in San Girolamo
- Jesuati
- Palazzo Schio
- History of religious life in Vicenza

== Bibliography ==
- Barbieri, Franco; Cevese, Renato (2004). Vicenza, ritratto di una città [Vicenza, portrait of a city] (in Italian). Vicenza: Angelo Colla editore. ISBN 88-900990-7-0.
- Giarolli, Giambattista (1955). Vicenza nella sua toponomastica stradale [Vicenza and its street names] (in Italian). Vicenza: Scuola Tip. San Gaetano.
- Mantese, Giovanni (1952). Memorie storiche della Chiesa vicentina, I, Dalle origini al Mille [Historical records of the Vicenza Church, I, From the origins to the year 1000] (in Italian). Vicenza: Accademia Olimpica.
- Mantese, Giovanni (1954a). Memorie storiche della Chiesa vicentina, II, Dal Mille al Milletrecento [Historical records of the Vicenza Church, II, From the year 1000 to the year 1300] (in Italian). Vicenza: Accademia Olimpica.
- Mantese, Giovanni (1958). Memorie storiche della Chiesa vicentina, III/1, Il Trecento [Historical records of the Vicenza Church, III/1, The 14th century] (in Italian). Vicenza: Accademia Olimpica.
- Mantese, Giovanni (1964). Memorie storiche della Chiesa vicentina, III/2, Dal 1404 al 1563 [Historical records of the Vicenza Church, III/2, From 1404 to 1563] (in Italian). Vicenza: Neri Pozza editore.
- Mantese, Giovanni (1974a). Memorie storiche della Chiesa vicentina, IV/1, Dal 1563 al 1700 [Historical records of the Vicenza Church, IV/1, From 1563 to 1700] (in Italian). Vicenza: Accademia Olimpica.
- Mantese, Giovanni (1974b). Memorie storiche della Chiesa vicentina, IV/2, Dal 1563 al 1700 [Historical records of the Vicenza Church, IV/2, From 1563 to 1700] (in Italian). Vicenza: Accademia Olimpica.
- Mantese, Giovanni (1982a). Memorie storiche della Chiesa vicentina, V/1, Dal 1700 al 1866 [Historical records of the Vicenza Church, V/1, From 1700 to 1866] (in Italian). Vicenza: Accademia Olimpica.
- Mantese, Giovanni (1982b). Memorie storiche della Chiesa vicentina, V/2, Dal 1700 al 1866 [Historical records of the Vicenza Church, V/2, From 1700 to 1866] (in Italian). Vicenza: Accademia Olimpica.
- Mantese, Giovanni (1954b). Memorie storiche della Chiesa vicentina, VI, Dal Risorgimento ai nostri giorni [Historical records of the Vicenza Church, VI, From the Risorgimento to the present day] (in Italian). Vicenza: Scuola Tip. San Gaetano.
- Scapin, Giuseppe (1969). Brevi notizie storiche della parrocchia di S. Marco in S. Girolamo [Brief historical notes on the parish of S. Marco in S. Girolamo] (in Italian). Vicenza: Scuola grafica Istituto S. Gaetano.
- Soragni, Ugo (1988). Architettura e città dall'Ottocento al nuovo secolo: palladianisti e ingegneri (1848-1915), in Storia di Vicenza, Vol. IV/2, L'Età contemporanea [Architecture and cities from the 19th century to the new century: Palladianists and engineers (1848-1915), in History of Vicenza, Vol. IV/2, The Contemporary Age] (in Italian). Vicenza: Neri Pozza editore.
- Sottani, Natalino (2012). Antica idrografia vicentina. Storia, evidenze, ipotesi [Ancient hydrography in the Vicenza area. History, evidence, hypotheses] (in Italian). Vicenza: Accademia Olimpica. Bibcode:2012aivs.book.....S.
