= Palazzo Schio =

Coordinates: 45.5517°N 11.5435°E

UNESCO World Heritage Site
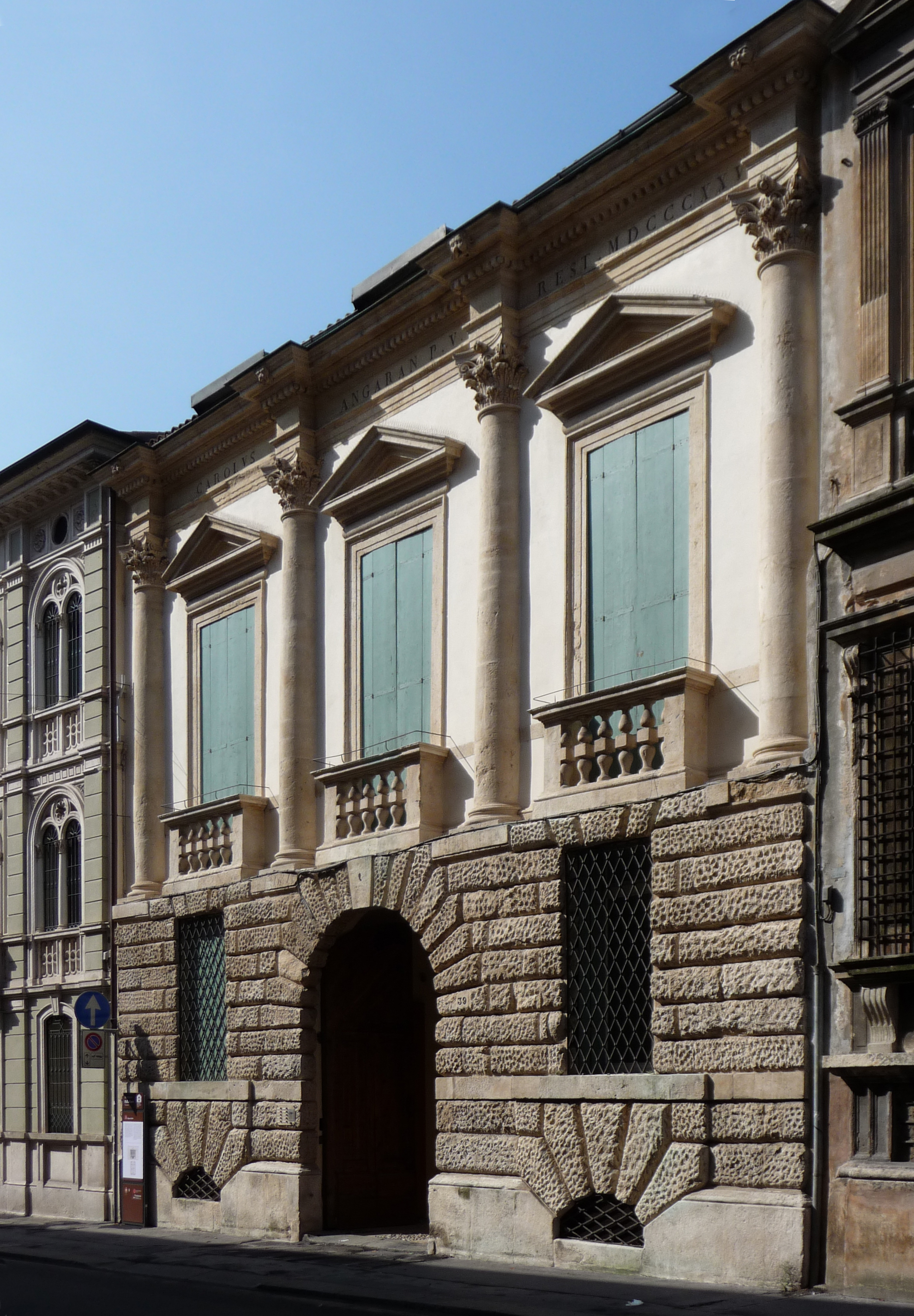

- Location within Veneto Location within Italy
- Location: Vicenza, Province of Vicenza, Veneto, Italy
- Part of: City of Vicenza and the Palladian Villas of the Veneto
- Criteria: Cultural: (i)(ii)
- Reference: 712bis-001
- Inscription: 1994 (18th Session)

Palazzo Schio (also known as Palazzo Schio Vaccari Lioy Angaran) is a patrician palace of the 16th century in Vicenza, northern Italy, whose facade was designed by the Italian Renaissance architect Andrea Palladio in 1565.

== History ==
In 1565, Palladio designed for Bernardo Schio the facade of his house in Vicenza, in the neighbourhood of the Ponte Pusterla. Since Palladio was occupied in these years with a series of Venetian projects which required his almost permanent presence in the capital of the Venetian Republic, his supervision of the building works on the Palazzo Schio became so distracted that the master-mason charged with its execution interrupted works for want of any clear instructions.

After Bernardo's death, his widow showed no interest in concluding the works, which were only completed by Bernardo's brother Fabrizio in 1574–75, after the stones and other construction materials had long lain piled up in the villa's courtyard.

After the Schio house, the building was acquired by other noble houses of Vicenza: Vaccari, then Lioy, and later Angaran. The palace was restored – with some alterations – by the noble Carlo Angaran in 1825, as reported in the Latin inscription under the upper cornice:

CAROLVS ANGARAN P.[atricius] V.[icentinus] REST.[auravit] MDCCCXXV

== Description ==
The representative facade of the building along the street is relatively narrow. For the piano nobile, Palladio opts for its division into three arches of equal width, divided by four half-columns with Corinthian capitals, free at three-quarters of the wall height and whose base is integrated with the hanging of the socket.

The spaces between the columns are occupied by three windows with an overhanging balcony, each surmounted by a triangular pediment in strong projection. Intended to illuminate the barn, three windows cut into the frame architrave, and closed in 1825, occupied the upper end. The facade is also animated by a play of light and shadow, through articulation in several layers of depth obtained by the use of columns, molding and balcony windows and gables. The socket base is coated with a rustication. The architect breaks the relative monotony of the bosses texture with the arch of the entrance lobby, and especially with the trapezoidal grounds that surround the two side openings below.

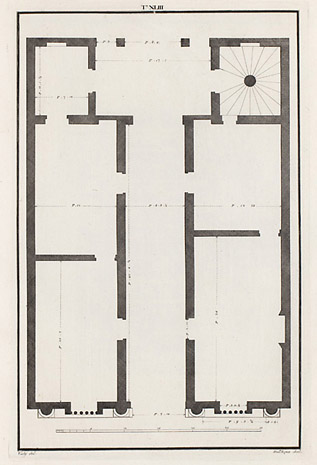
Floor plan of the palace (drawing by Ottavio Bertotti Scamozzi, 1776)

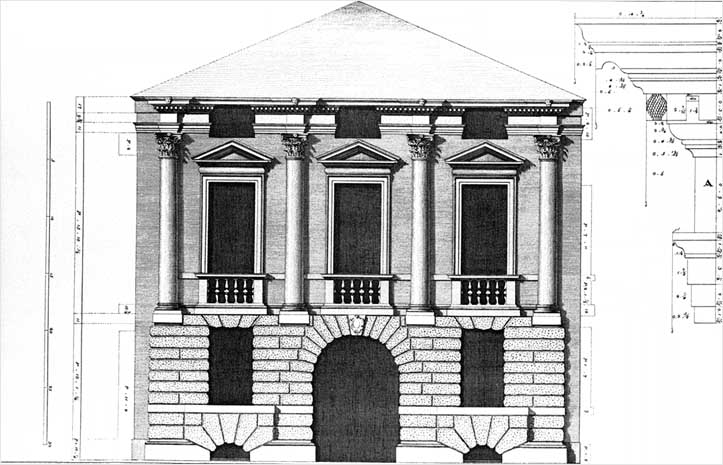
Facade designed by Andrea Palladio (drawing by Ottavio Bertotti Scamozzi, 1776)

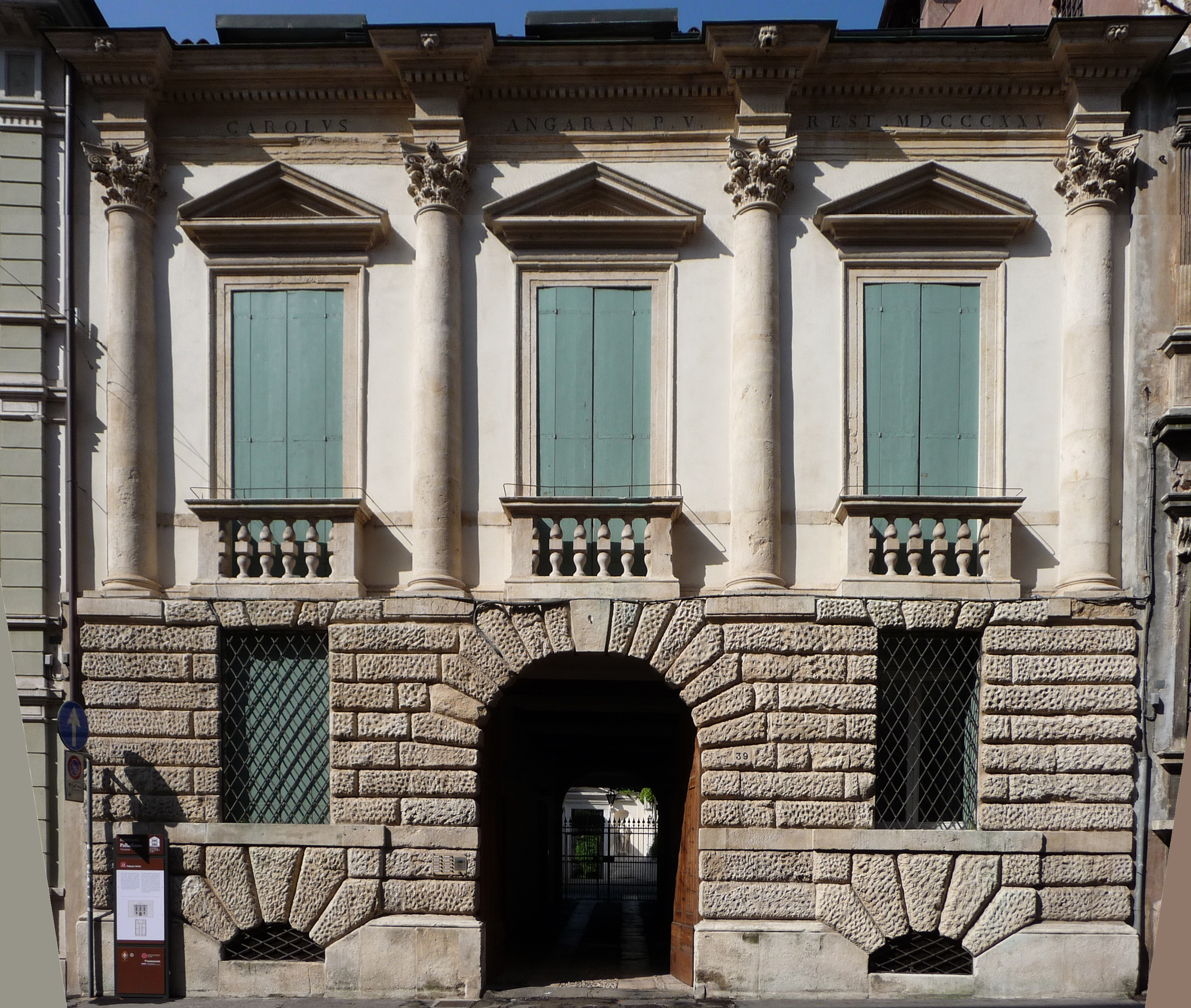
The actual facade

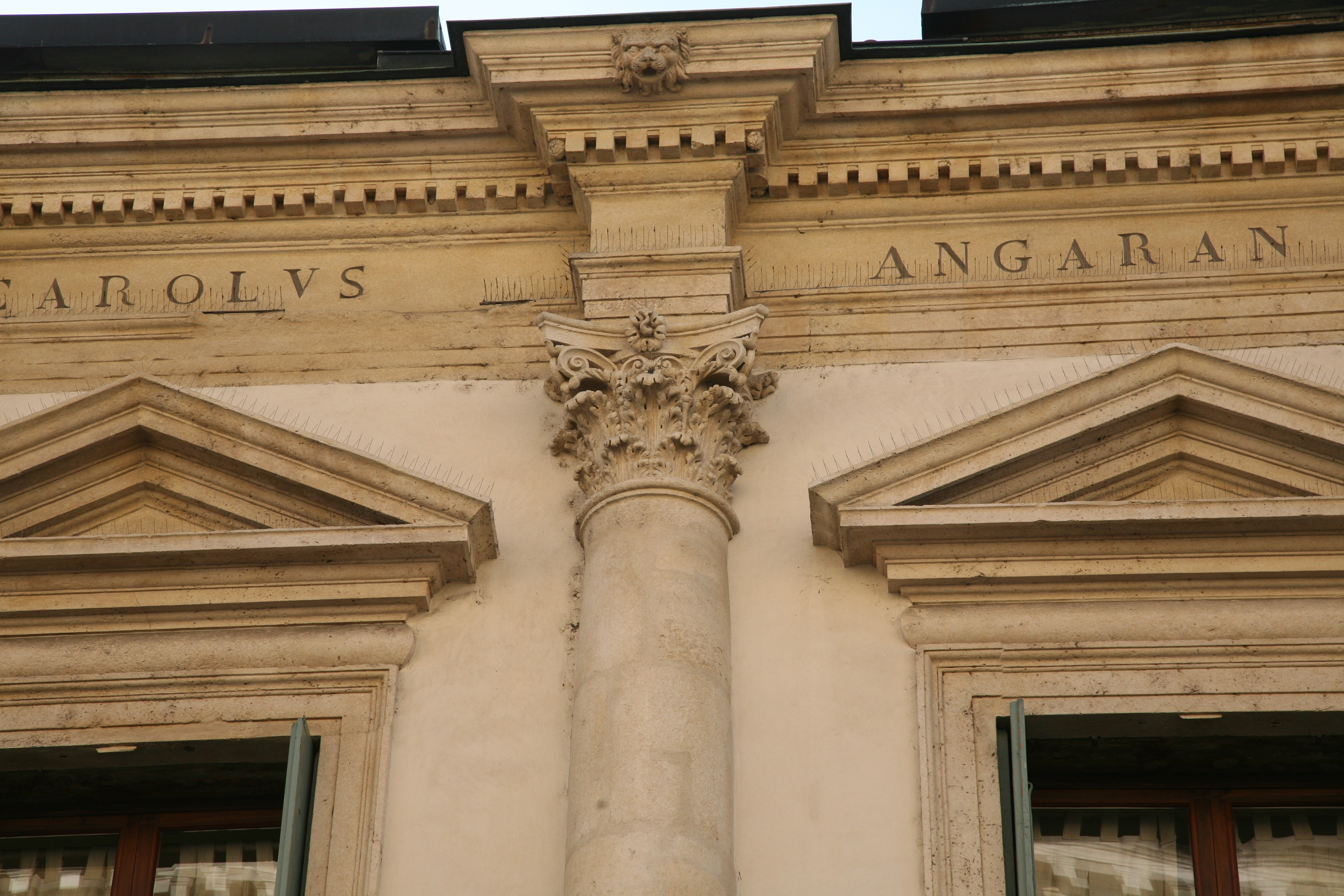
Detail of the facade
