= Asado =

Barbecue style in various South American countries

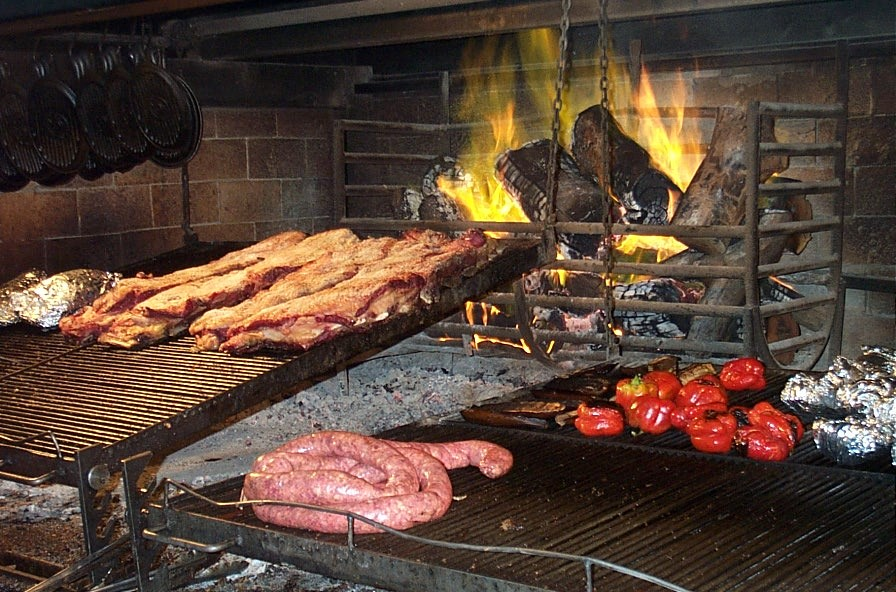
A typical asado in Argentina

Asado (Spanish: [aˈsaðo]) is the technique and the social event of having or attending a barbecue in various South American countries: especially Argentina and Uruguay where it is also a traditional event, as well as Brazil (Rio Grande do Sul), Chile and Paraguay. An asado usually consists of beef, pork, chicken, chorizo, and morcilla, all of which are cooked using an open fire or a grill, called a parrilla. Usually, red wine and side dishes such as salads accompany the main meats, which are prepared by a designated cook called the asador or parrillero.

== Coal and fire ==
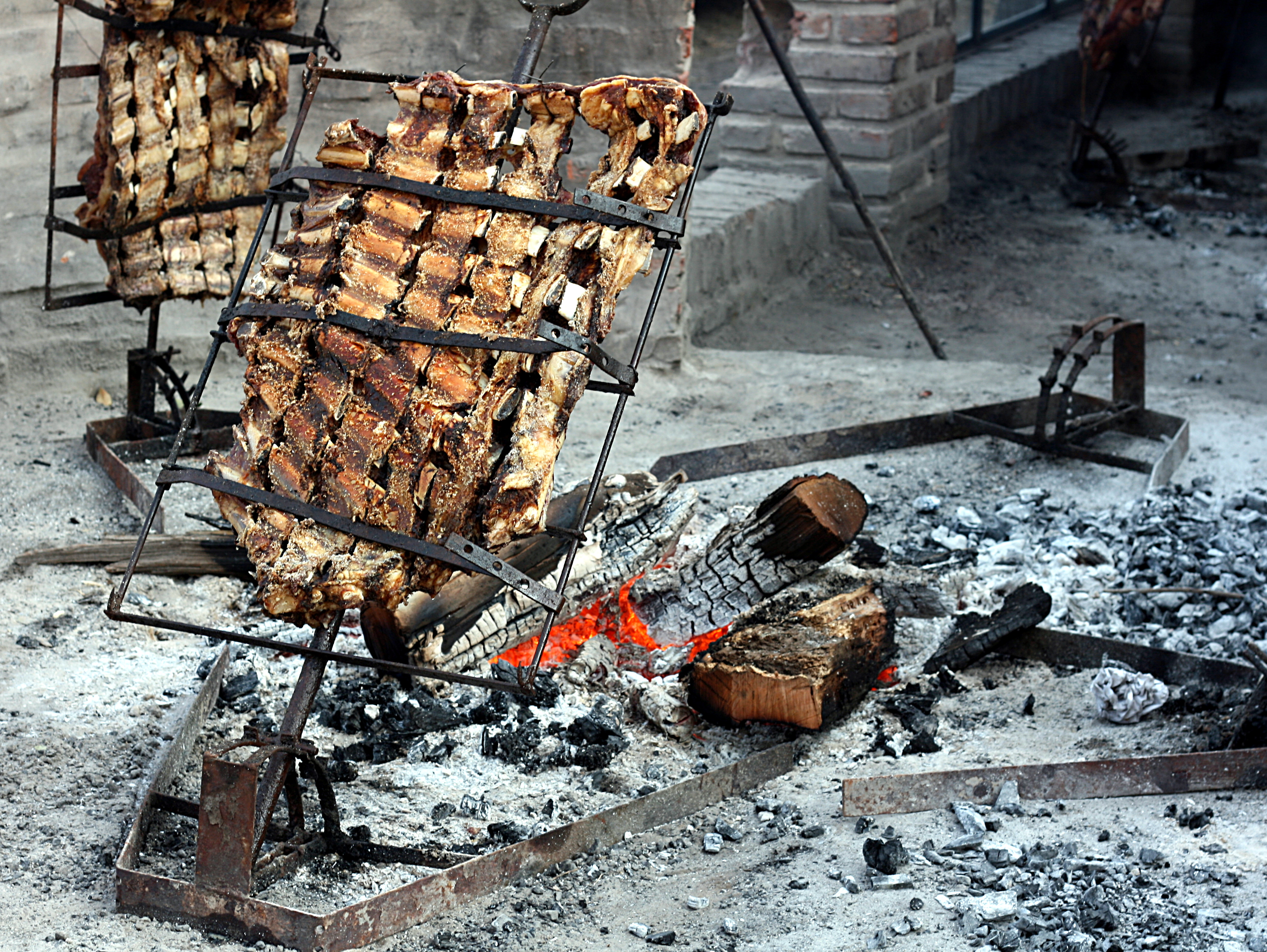
Asado on an open pit

Usually, the asador begins by igniting the charcoal, which is often made of native trees (such as quebracho or algarrobo), avoiding pines and eucalyptus as they have strong-smelling resins. In more sophisticated asados the charcoal is of a specific tree or made from the coal of recently burned wood, which is also commonplace when having an asado in a campfire. In Uruguay, charcoal is not used; instead, the asado is grilled directly over embers or hot coals.

Cooking can be done al asador or a la parrilla. In the first case, a fire is lit on the ground or in a fire pit/grill and surrounded by metal crosses (asadores) that hold the entire carcass of an animal splayed open to receive the heat from the fire. In the second case, a fire is made and, after the charcoal has formed, a grill with the meat is placed over it.

=== Embutidos and achuras ===
In many asados, chorizos, morcillas (black pudding), chinchulines (cow chitterlings), mollejas (sweetbreads), and other organs, often accompanied by provoleta, would be served first while the cuts that require longer preparations are still on the grill. Sometimes these are served on a charcoal brasero. Chorizos may be served with pan felipe or baguette bread, often called choripán.

=== Meats ===
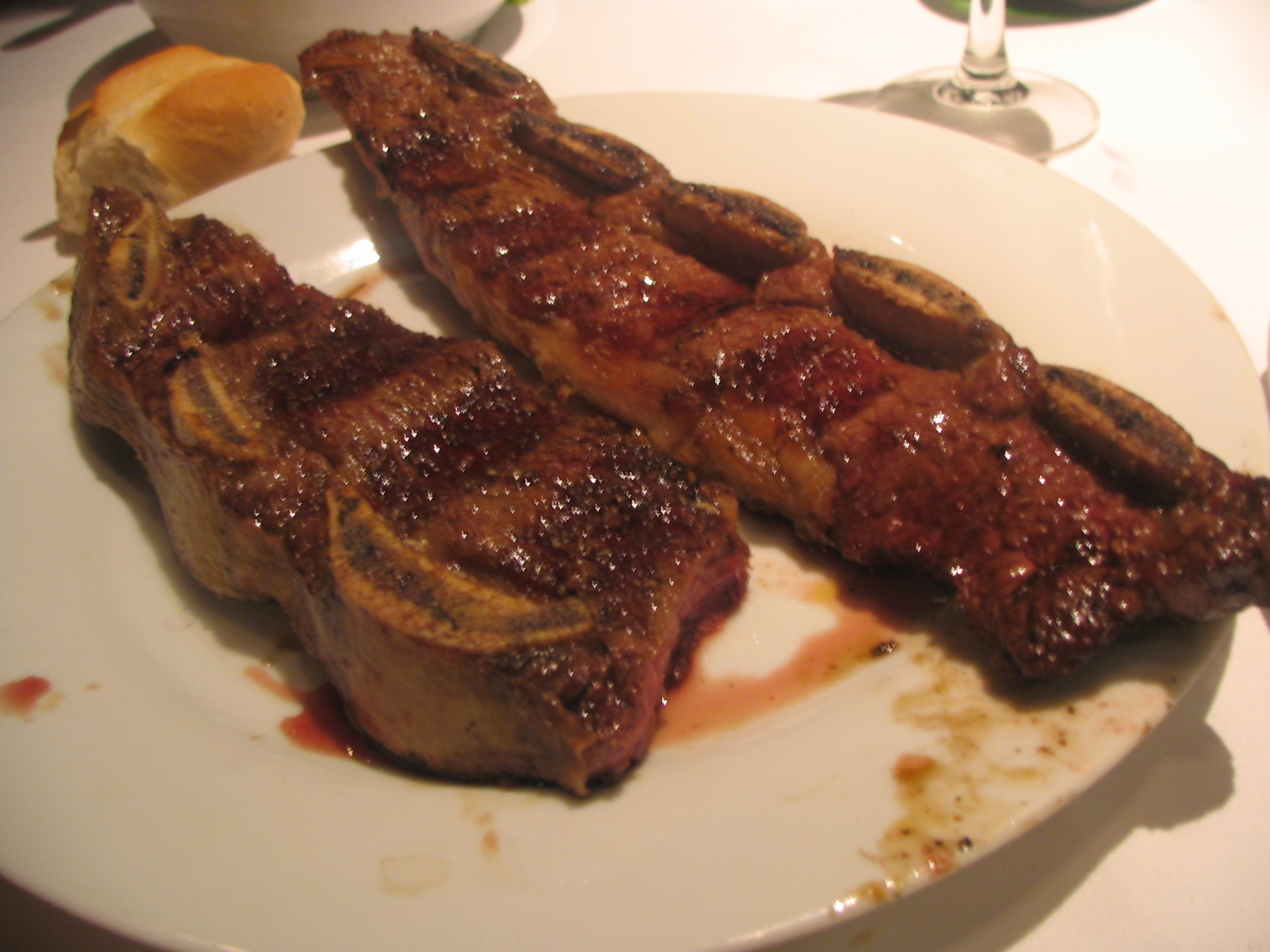
Asado de tira, flanken-cut short ribs.

After appetizers, costillas or asado de tira (ribs) can be served. Next comes vacío (flank steak), matambre and possibly chicken and chivito (goatling). Dishes such as pamplona, pork, and Patagonian lamb are becoming more frequent, particularly in restaurants. An asado also includes bread, a simple mixed salad of, for instance, lettuce, tomato, and onions, or it could be accompanied with verdurajo (grilled vegetables), a mixture made of potatoes, corn, onion, and eggplant cooked on the grill and seasoned with olive oil and salt. Beer, wine, soft drinks, and other beverages are common. Dessert is usually fresh fruit.

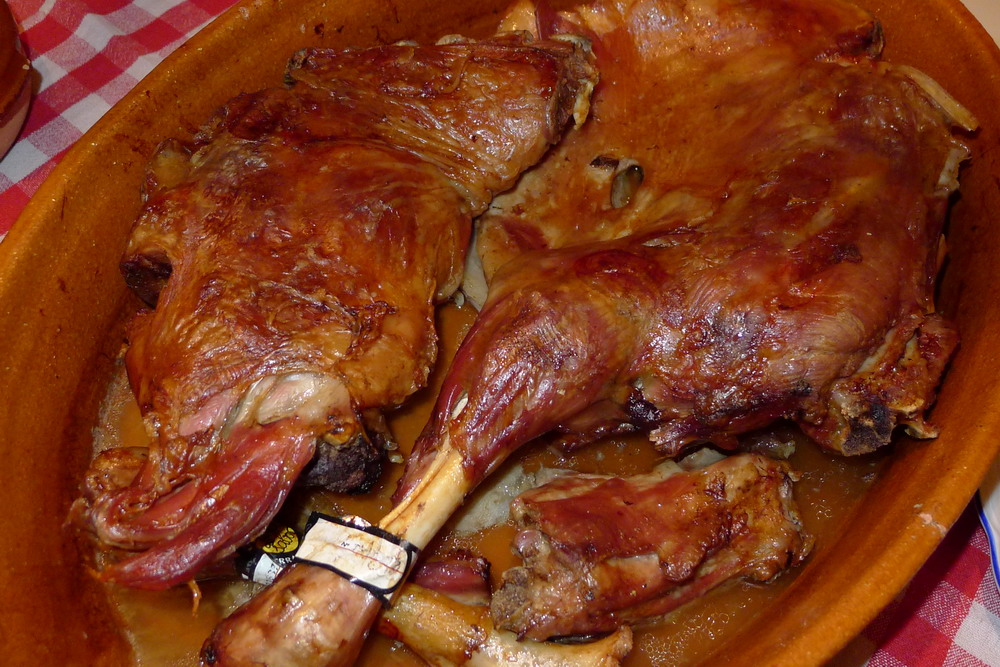
Lechazo asado (roast lechazo), shown above, is a typical dish from Spanish cuisine, as is the similar Cochinillo asado (roast suckling pig).

Another traditional form to mainly roast the meat, used in Patagonia, is with the whole animal (especially lamb and pork) in a wooden stick nailed in the ground and exposed to the heat of live coals, called asado al palo.

The meat for an asado is not marinated, the only preparation being the application of salt before or during the cooking period. Also, the heat and distance from the coals are controlled to provide a slow cooking; it usually takes around two hours to cook asado. Further, grease from the meat is not encouraged to fall on the coals and create smoke, which would adversely flavour the meat. In some asados the area directly under the meat is kept clear of coals.

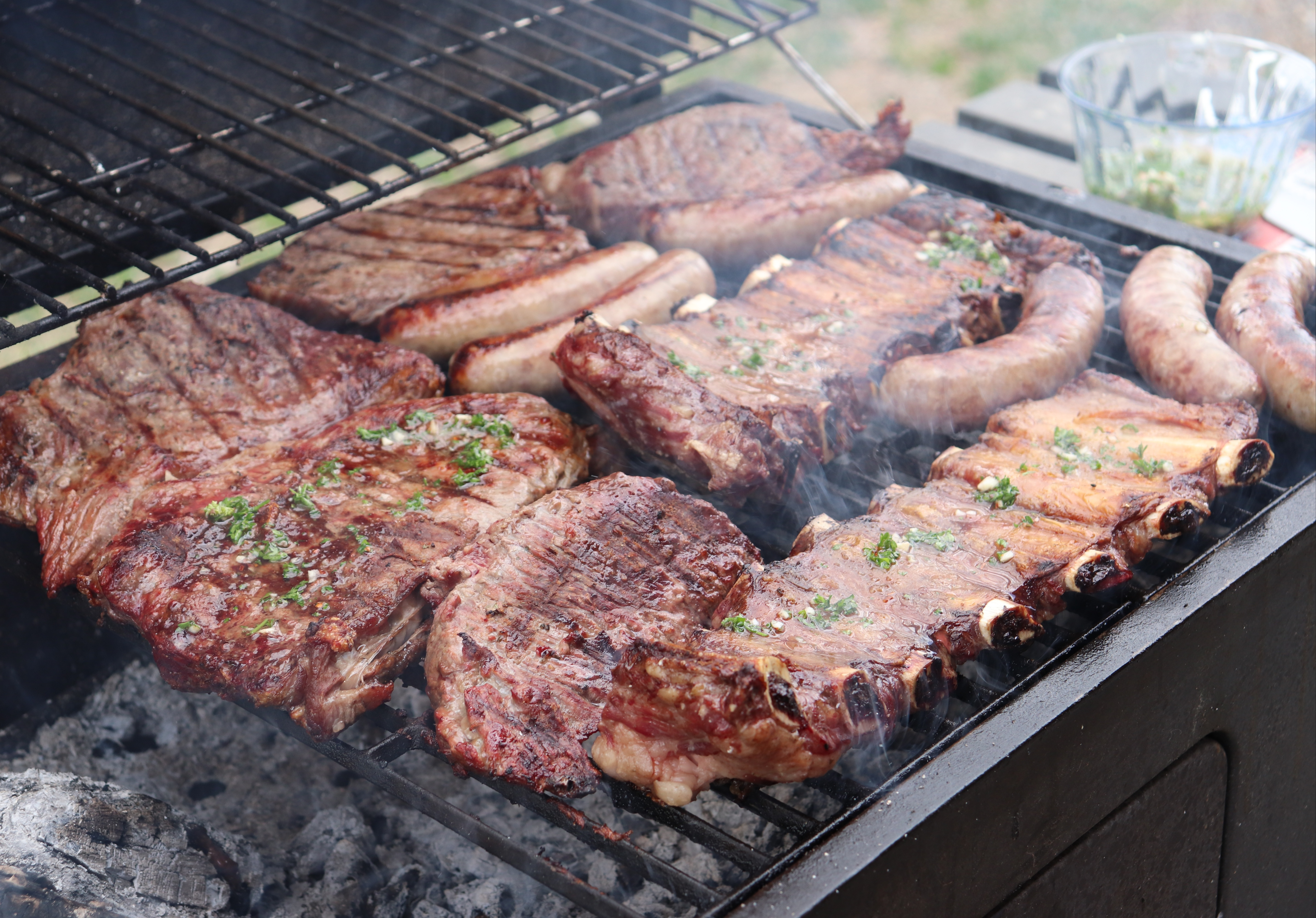
Asado done on a grill using firewood.

The asado is usually placed in a tray to be immediately served, but it can also be placed on a brasero right on the table to keep the meat warm. Chimichurri, a sauce of chopped parsley, dried oregano, garlic, salt, black pepper, onion, and paprika with olive oil, or salsa criolla, a sauce of tomato and onion in vinegar, are common accompaniments to an asado, where they are traditionally used on the offal, but not the steaks.

=== Salad ===
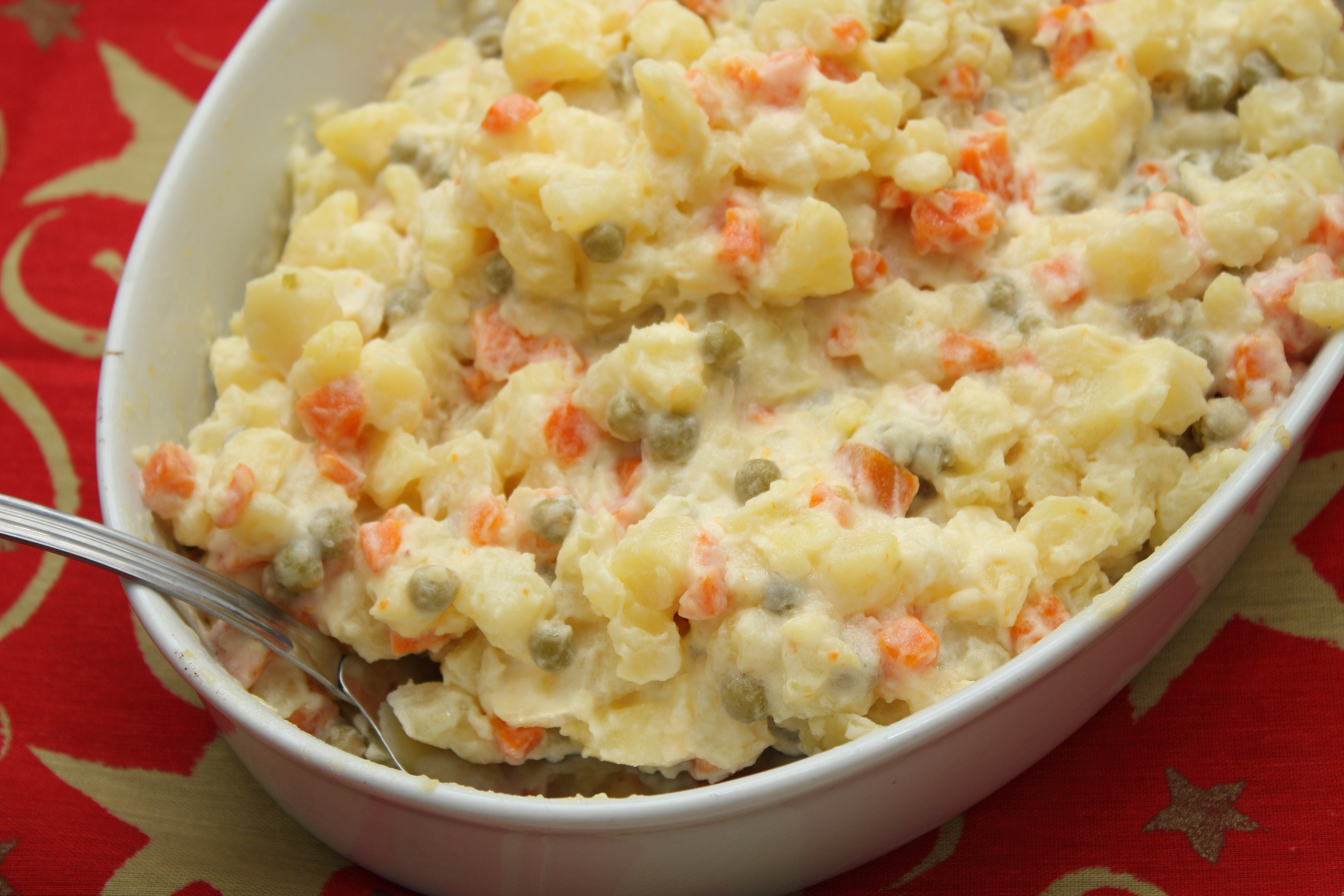
Salad Olivier (ensalada rusa or russian salad) made in Argentina

Food is often accompanied by salads, which in asado gatherings are traditionally made by women on site or brought to the asado from their homes while the men focus on the meats. Salad Olivier (ensalada rusa) is one of the most common salads served at asados. In Paraguay chipa guasu, sopa paraguaya and boiled manioc as a side dish are also served. Although salads are typically served as a side, home asados are often eaten as a standalone dish, usually right off the cutting board. In those cases, it can be paired with chimichurri, and slices of French bread to soak up the juices.

== Variations ==
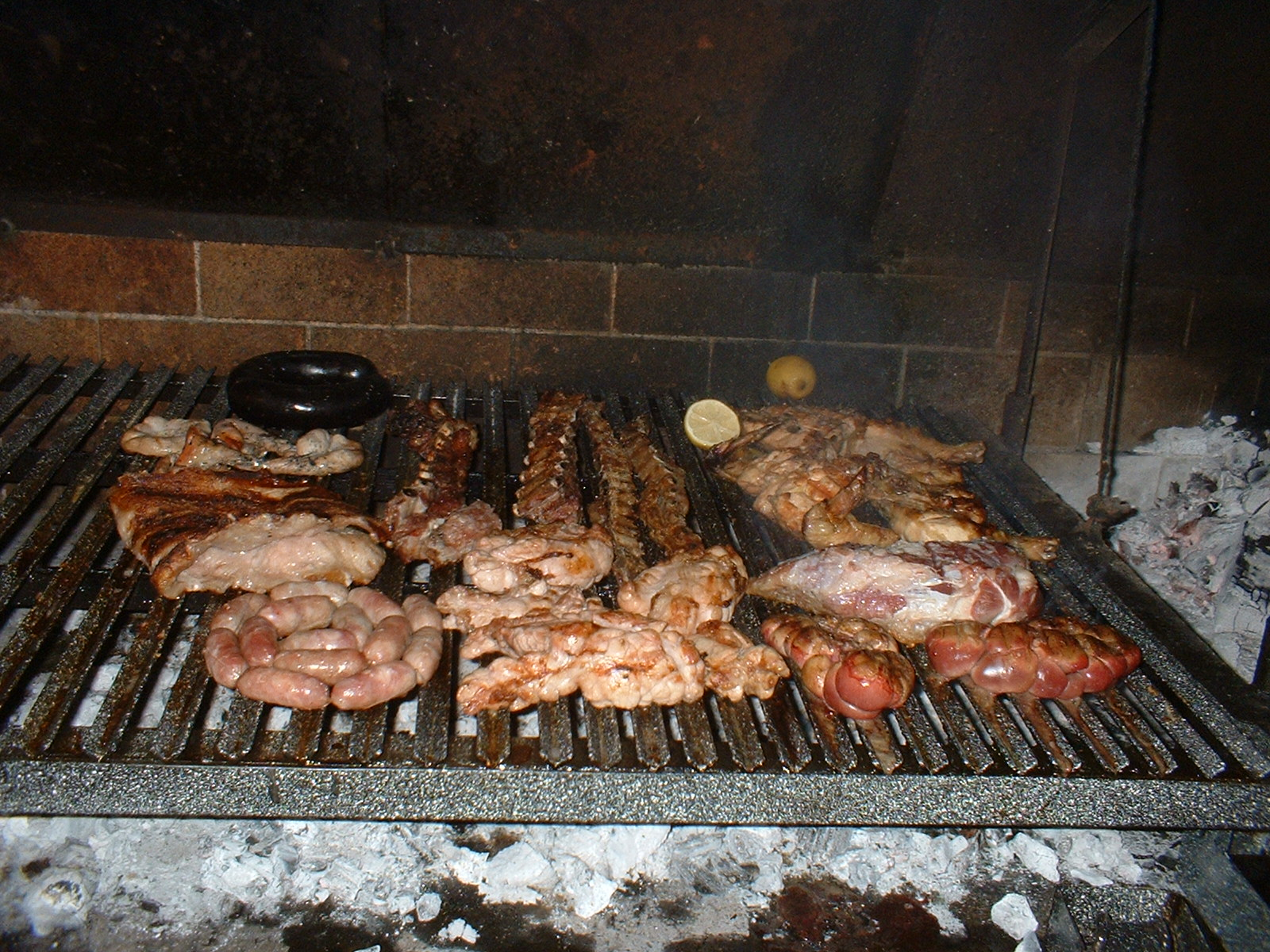
A typical Argentinean asado assortment consisting of beef, pork, beef ribs, pork ribs, chitterlings, sweetbread, sausages, blood sausages, and chicken.

In Chile, the normal version cordero al palo (whole roast lamb) is usually accompanied with pebre, a fresh dip-style salad made from diced tomatoes, coriander, garlic, and hot peppers. This lamb dish is typical of southern Chile and is served hot accompanied by salads. A whole lamb is tied to a spit and is then roasted perpendicular on a wood fire. The preparation lasts around 5 hours since cooking must be constant and on a low heat.

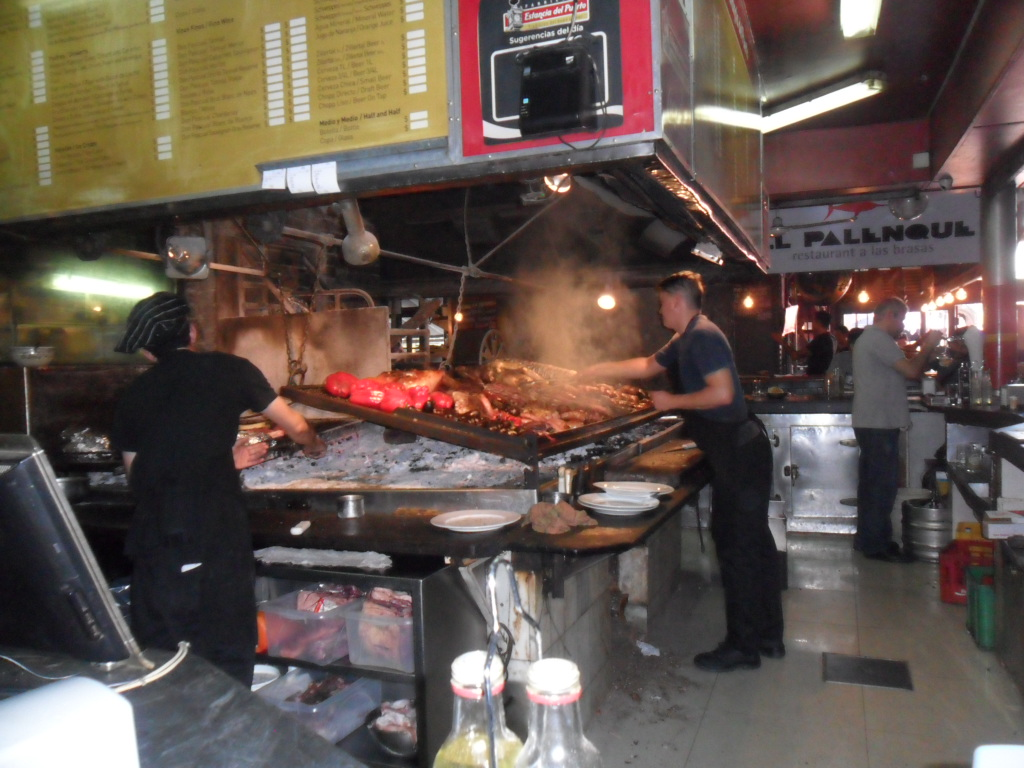
Line cooks grilling sausages, asado, and offal in Mercado del Puerto

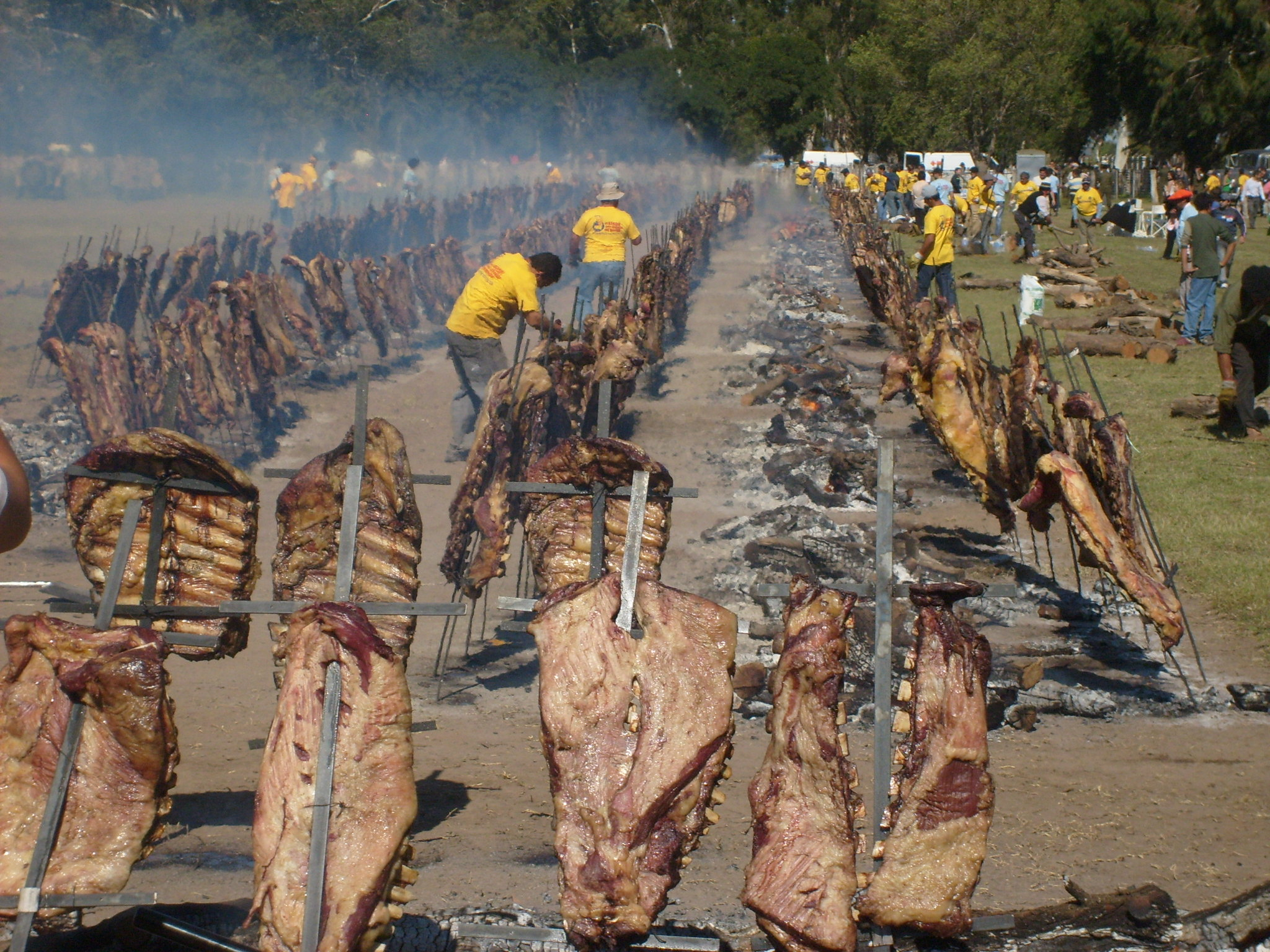
Asado in the La Pampa agricultural town of General Pico, Argentina.

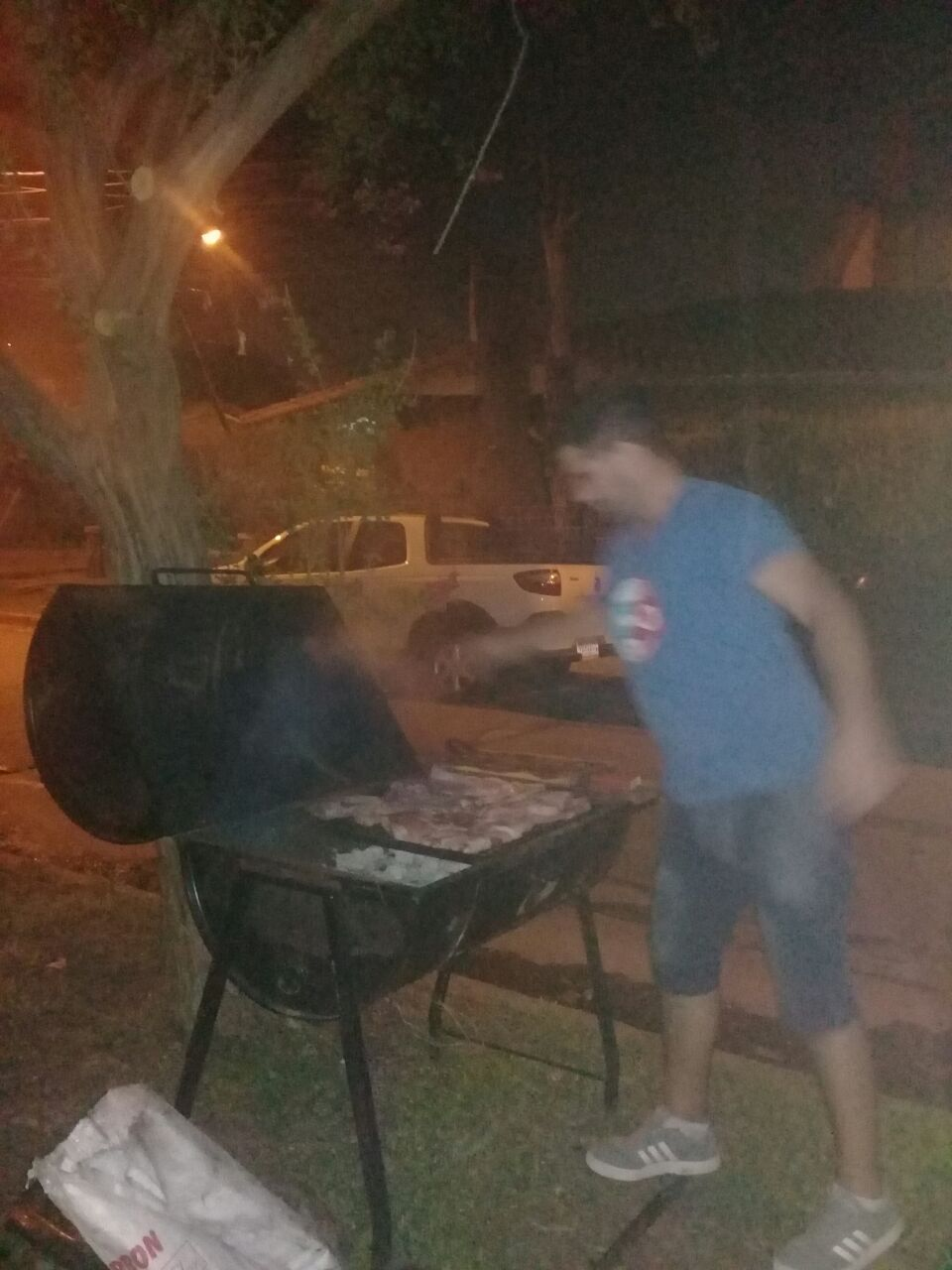
A "chulengo" is usually an oil barrel cut in half, used to protect the fire and meat from winds

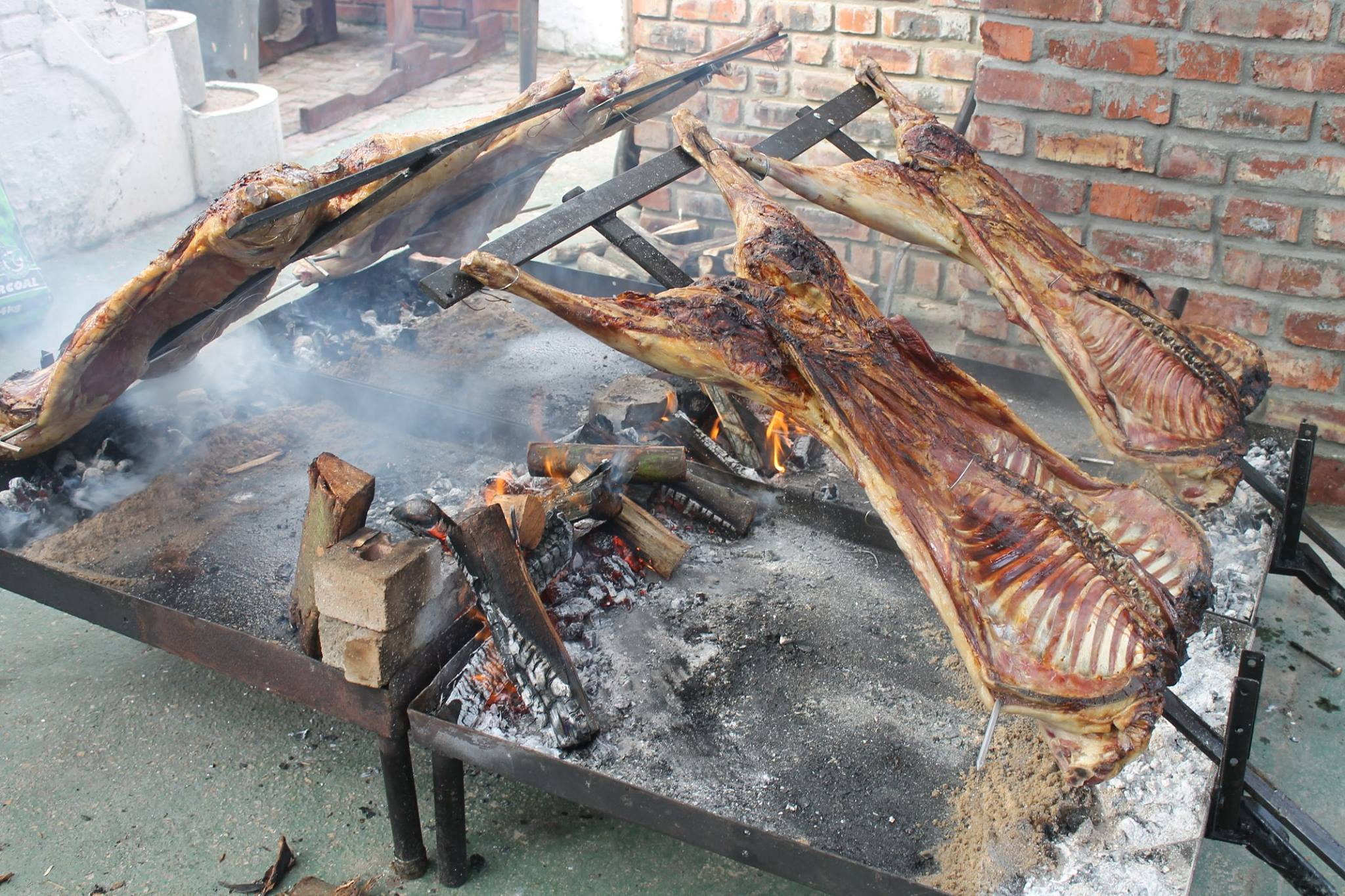
Asado in South Africa

In Brazil, asado is called churrasco, although the cooking is usually faster. Grilled and salted meat in Brazil is generally called "carne assada" and is often cut into small strips and served on a plate or cutting board in the middle of the table for all to partake. Various grilled meats, pork, sausages and occasionally chicken are also passed around from table to table on a spit and a slice is offered to each person. This is called "rodizio" because each person partakes in turn. Charcoal is predominantly used instead of embers of wood, and Brazilians tend to cook the meat on skewers or grills. The meat of Rozidio is usually seasoned with salt alone.

In Mexico, there is similar tradition of as parrilladas or carne asadas, which incorporates various marinated cuts of meat, including steaks, chicken, and sausages (chorizo, longaniza, and moronga being especially popular). These are all grilled over wood charcoal. Vegetables are also placed over the grill, especially green onions (cebollitas), nopales, and corn (elote).

Again, in Argentina, Uruguay, and Paraguay, some alternatives are the asado al disco and asado al horno de barro, especially in the countryside. The recipe does not change, only the way of cooking. In the asado al disco (the worn-out disc of a plough) is used. Being metallic and concave, three or four metallic legs are welded and with hot coal or lumber below it is easily transformed into an effective grill. Food is put in a spiral, in such a way that the fat naturally slips to the center, preserving the meat for being fried. Bell peppers and onions are usually put next to the edge, so that they gradually release their juices on the meat. The asado al horno de barro differs from tradition, as an adobe horno (oven, called tatakua in Paraguay) is used. These ovens are a common view in Argentine and Paraguayan estancias; their primary function is to bake bread, chipa guasu and sopa paraguaya, but they are well suited for roasting meat. Pork suckling and, less commonly, lamb are served, as they are more unlikely to become dry. Another way of cooking the asado is inside a chulengo, an oil barrel (or similar) cut in half, inside which the grill is placed to protect both the meat and fire from heavy winds. This makes the chulengo especially useful in the Patagonia region, although it is also used in other areas for practicality and the ability to move it around.

== Similar terms in other cuisines ==
South American asado should not be confused with asado in the Philippines, which refers to two different braised dishes: asado de carajay, which is braised meat with vegetables in a savory stew; and pork asado, which is a sweet braised version of char siu. The equivalent of Latin American asado barbecues in Philippine cuisine would be the various inihaw dishes (also known as sinugba or inasal).

In Portugal, a roasted fish dish served with sausages and bacon is also known as assado.

In Goa, roast beef is called assad, from Portuguese assado.

In South Africa, the activity of cooking meat or sausages on a grill over a fire is termed a braai. When a whole meat carcass cooked similarly to the al asador method, it is called asado spit braai or spit roast.

== See also ==
- Regional variations of barbecue
- List of barbecue dishes
- Argentine cuisine
  - Argentine beef
- Chilean cuisine
- Paraguayan cuisine
- Peruvian cuisine
- Uruguayan cuisine
  - Cuisine of Montevideo
