= Marcello Fogolino =

Italian painter

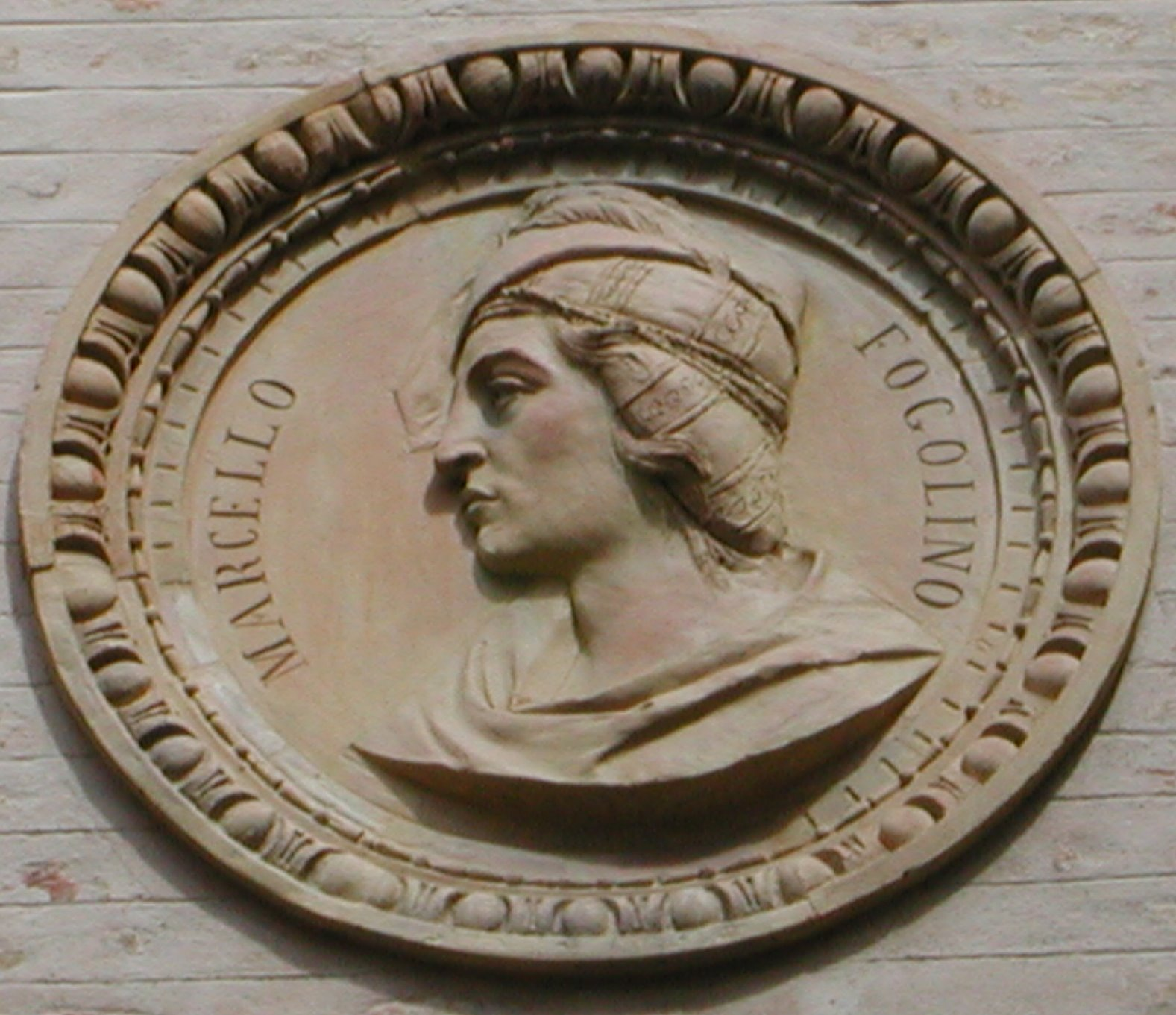
Picture of Marcello Fogolino on the Palazzo Thiene in Vicenza

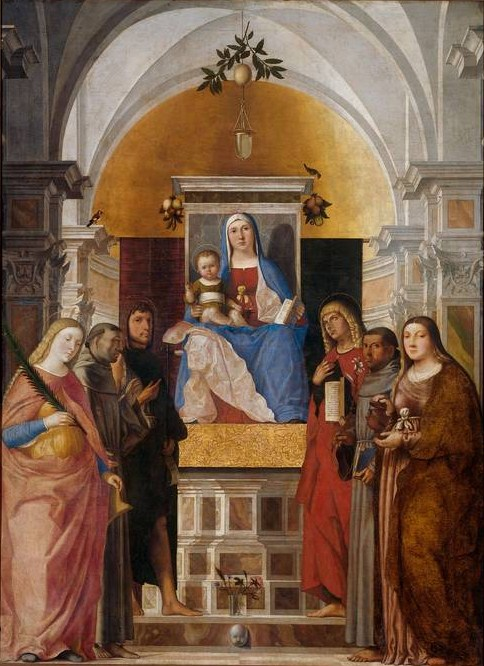
Marcello Fogolino, Madonna with child and saints, 1510 – 1520, Oil on canvas, 266 × 195 cm. Rijksmuseum, Amsterdam

Marcello Fogolino (active 1510–1548) was an Italian painter of the Renaissance or Mannerist style. Originally from San Vito in the Friuli, he worked early in his life he worked in Vicenza, under the painter Bartolomeo Montagna. He was also influenced by Giovanni Speranza and Pordenone.

Returning to Friuli in 1520–21, he came to reflect the painterly style of Il Pordenone. He completed a painting of Saints Francis and John the Baptist with Prophet Daniel for the Duomo in Pordenone.

He was banished from Venetian territories, along with his brother the architect Matteo, for complicity in a murder in 1527, and went to Trento. In Trento, he befriended the bishop Bernardo Clesio, which gave the brothers some protection. It appears that they became informants for the Venetian Republic, and finally were allowed to return to the Veneto. He painted frescoes in the Tridentine region, including Castel Buonconsiglio, Castello Malpaga, Villa Salvotti, and Palazzo Sardagna. He was also an engraver.
