= Pamplona (disambiguation) =

Pamplona is the capital city of Navarre in Spain.

Pamplona may also refer to:

== Places ==
- Kingdom of Pamplona (later called Kingdom of Navarre), a medieval kingdom
- Pamplona, Norte de Santander, in Colombia
- Pamplona, a neighbourhood in Guatemala City, Guatemala
- In the Philippines:
  - Pamplona, Cagayan
  - Pamplona, Camarines Sur
  - Pamplona, Negros Oriental
  - Pamplona, a barrio in Las Piñas

== Other uses ==
- Pamplona (meat), a stuffed and rolled grilled meat dish from Uruguay
- Pamplona (footballer) (1904-1973), Brazilian footballer
- Pamplona (leafhopper), a genus of insects in the tribe Cicadellini
