= Coronel Bogado =

- Town and district
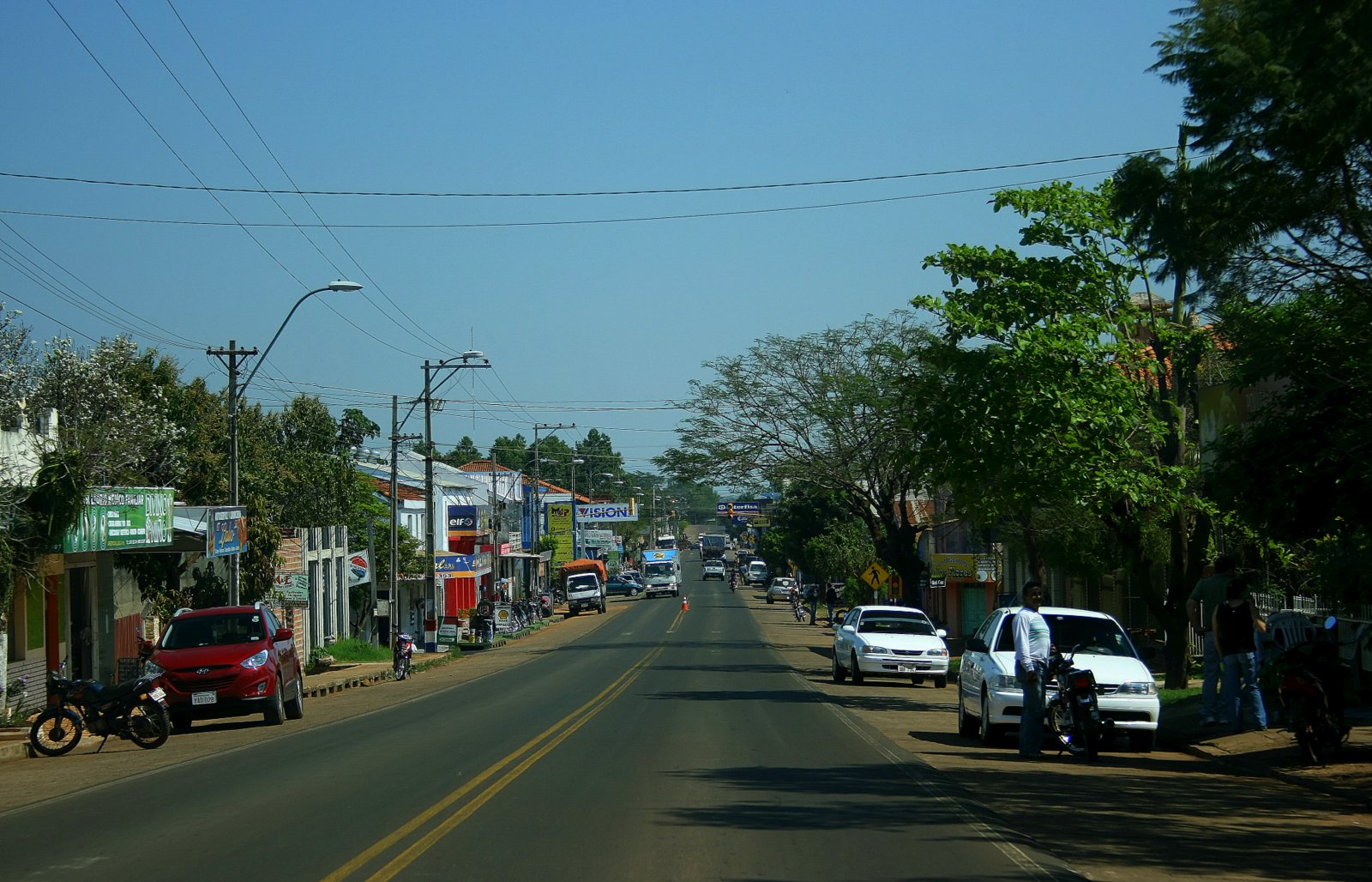
- Coronel Bogado, Paraguay

- Location within Paraguay
- Coordinates: 27°10′12″S 56°15′0″W
- Country: Paraguay
- Department: Itapúa Department

Area
  - Total: 687.2 km^{2} (265.3 sq mi)

Population (2022)
  - Total: 17,192
  - Density: 25.02/km^{2} (64.8/sq mi)

Coronel Bogado District is a town and district in the Itapúa Department of Paraguay. The district spans 687.2 square kilometers and its population reached 17,192 residents as of the 2022 Paraguayan census. It is located in the southern part of the country, about 320 kilometers south of the national capital, Asunción and 47 kilometers northwest of the department capital, Encarnación. Strategically positioned along National Route 1, Coronel Bogado is widely recognized as the "National Capital of the Chipa," a title it was granted officially in 2017.

== Geography and location ==
Coronel Bogado is located in the southern part of Paraguay, in the Itapúa Department, about 320 kilometers south of the national capital, Asunción and 47 kilometers northwest of the department capital, Encarnación.

== Demographics ==
According to data from the General Directorate of Statistics of Paraguay, the population of Coronel Bogado grew from 17,065 inhabitants recorded in the 2002 Paraguayan census to 17,192 inhabitants recorded in the 2022 Paraguayan census, representing an annual growth rate of 0.04% over the two decade period. Across the district's total area of 687.2 square kilometers, this population size yields a population density of 25.02 people per square kilometer. The 2022 census data revealed a highly balanced gender distribution, consisting of 8,561 males and 8,631 females, each comprising approximately 50% of the population. Structurally, the population is mostly urban and working age. Approximately 56.5% (9,709 people) reside in urban centers compared to 43.5% (7,483 people) in rural areas, while 64.9% (11,153 people) fall into the 15-64 age bracket, with children aged 0-14 making up 23.1% (3,967 people) and elderly residents aged 65 and older accounting for the remaining 12.1% (2,072 people).

== Economy ==
Coronel Bogado is known as the "Chipa Capital", due to the production and sale of chipa, a traditional Paraguayan bread, serving as a primary source of employment in the district. The history of the chipa in Coronel Bogado started in 1940 with the first chipa maker Rosalía del Carmen Rodríguez, from Asunción, affectionately known as Ña Rosa. Today, local chiperías are located along National Route 1 as popular stops for travelers. In 2017, the National Directorate of Intellectual Property officially designated Coronel Bogado as the "National Capital of the Chipa." The district partners with national authorities to host the annual National Chipa Festival on 29 December. Among the most popular recipes are: chipa aramirõ (with starch), chipa with rings, chipa with cheese, chipa so'o (with meat), chipa with ham and cheese filling, and chipa mestiza (with both starch and cornmeal). As for its ingredients, the traditional version contains: cassava starch, Paraguayan cheese, lard, anise, and in some cases, a little cornmeal. Traditionally, it is baked in a clay oven called a tatakua, but can be baked in an electric oven too.
