= Giovanni Antonio da Brescia =

Italian painter (1460–1523)

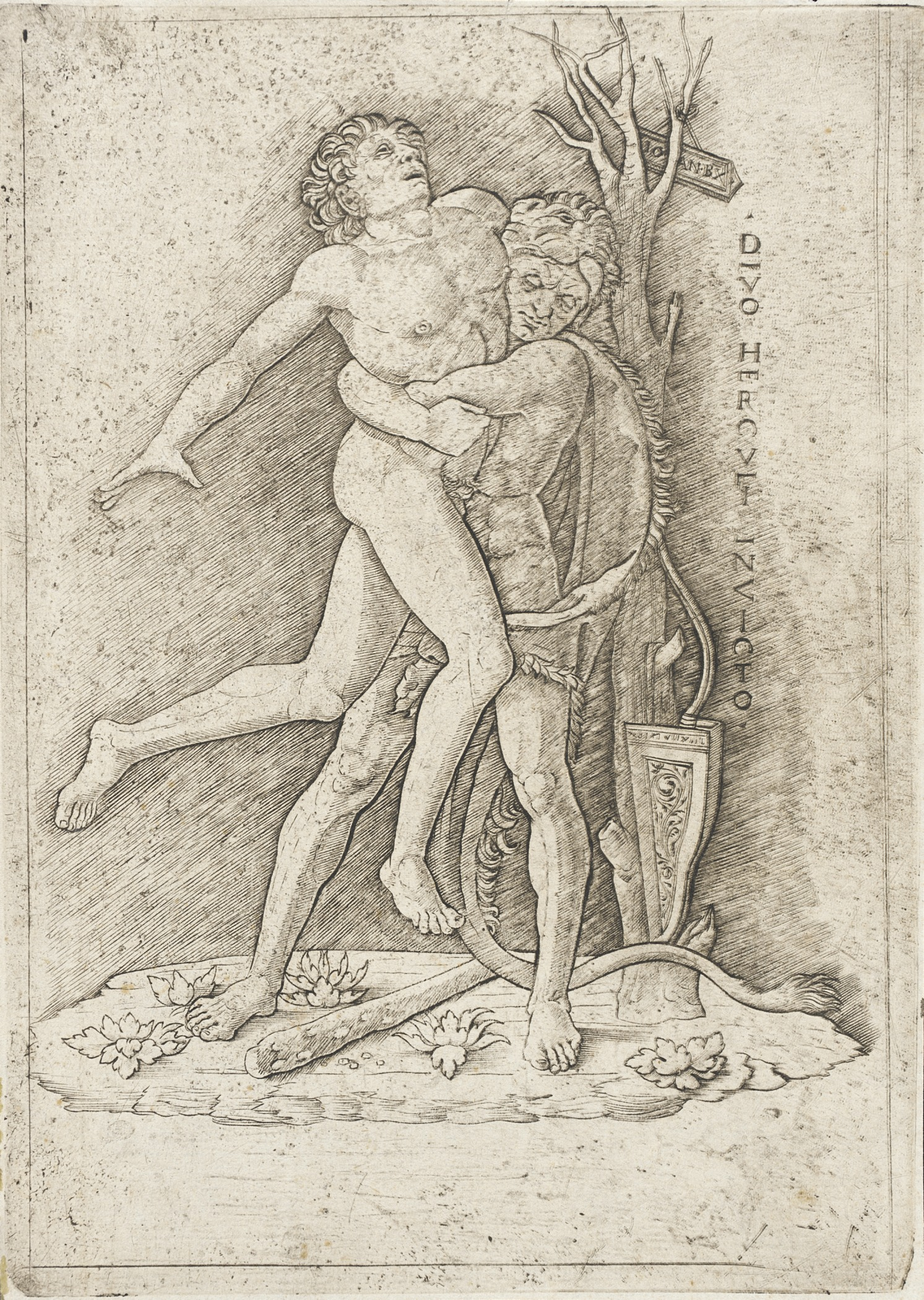
Hercules and Antaeus, in the style of Andrea Mantegna, engraving

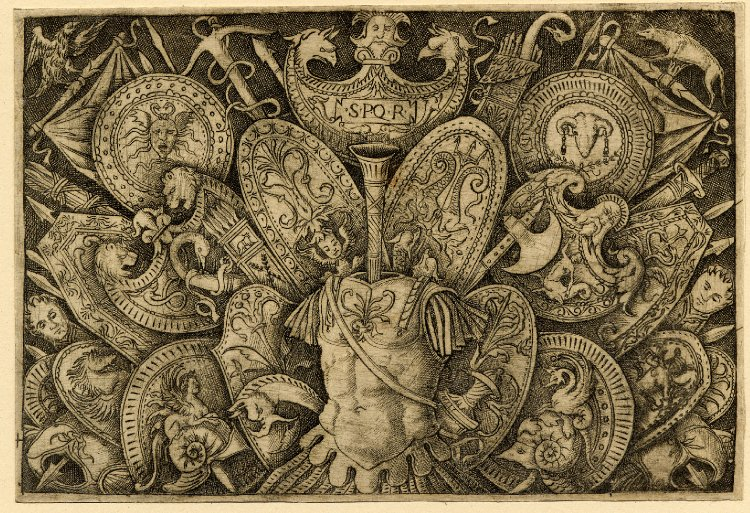
Ornament print of armour

Giovanni Antonio da Brescia was an Italian engraver of northern Italy, active in the approximate period 1490–1519, during the Italian Renaissance. In his early career he used the initials "Z.A." to sign some twenty engravings, and until recently Zoan Andrea was regarded as a distinct printmaker; it is now realized that they are the same person, and the "Z.A." stood for Giovanni Antonio, "Zovanni" being a north Italian spelling. Around 1507 he began to use formulae such as "IO.AN.BX.", and signed some prints more fully. The real Zoan Andrea was a very obscure painter, documented as working in Mantua in the 1470s, who produced no engravings.

The newly expanded oeuvre comprises at least 150 engravings, making Giovanni Antonio one of the most prolific Italian engravers of this period. A large number copy other prints, as was then common, and others are probably after drawings by Andrea Mantegna; "all his major works seem to have been based on designs by other artists" ("major" here presumably excludes the large number of ornament prints).

Beginning his printmaking career in a close but uncertain relationship with the aged Andrea Mantegna (c. 1431–1506) in Mantua, as some kind of pupil or collaborator, he then may have travelled around north Italy, and certainly spent his later printmaking years in Rome. He developed his technique, becoming a technical influence on other Italian engravers, notably Marcantonio Raimondi.

== Life ==
Though he was apparently from Brescia in northern Italy, there are no documentary records of his life other than the prints; the locations and rough timing of his career have been worked out from these. He began his traceable printmaking career in the circle of Mantegna, arriving in Mantua in the 1490s, and leaving around 1506, perhaps after Mantegna's death that year. He may have been relatively old and experienced as an artist in another medium when he joined the aged Mantegna. It is assumed he moved to Rome, as his later engravings depict works available to him only in that city, but the date this happened varies between different accounts. After he left Mantua Benedetto Montagna and his father Bartolomeo Montagna, both of Vicenza, become influences, and a period there has been posited. He also appears to have spent time in Florence, as one print copies a drawing by Filippino Lippi.

The date of his arrival in Rome is estimated to be around 1506, c. 1509, and "likely" by 1513. One print shows the famous Roman sculpture the Laocoön Group, which was excavated in 1506. According to Jacquelyn Sheehan (in 1973), he must have been active there until at least 1525, from the date of a painting he engraved, but Zucker and the British Museum end his activity about 1519 or 1520; another print copies a painting of 1519.

== Prints ==
His prints are mainly concerned with the figures, which often occupy most of the picture space. Unlike many of his contemporaries, who adopted the extensive landscape backgrounds pioneered by Albrecht Dürer, he is, like Mantegna, relatively little interested in the backgrounds, which are often blank or very simple. According to Sheehan "he never achieves a true unity between figures and setting, as do the more advanced masters of the 16th century".

In Mantua his relationship with Mantegna was apparently close, but the precise nature of it remains uncertain. Mantegna had been interested in printmaking for decades, probably since the 1460s, and he is "the artist who can best be claimed to have "invented" printmaking in Italy".

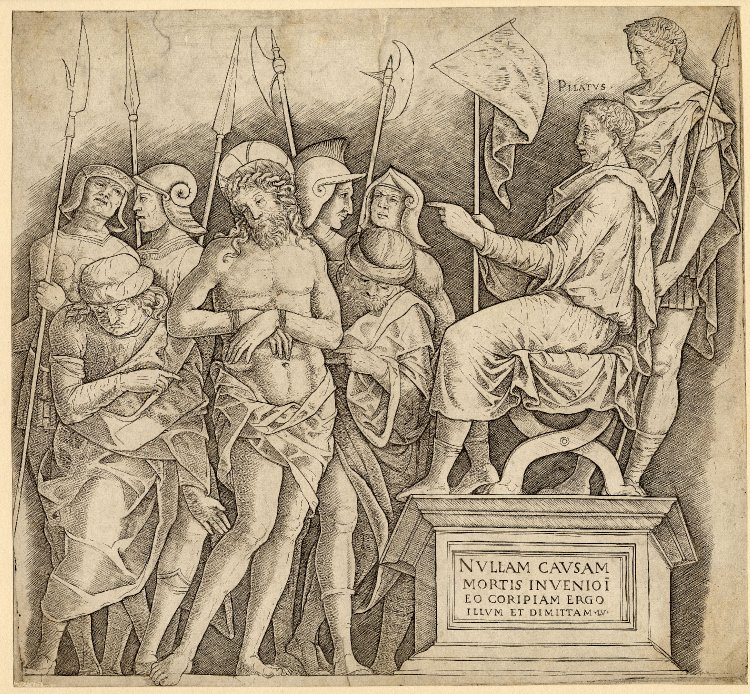
Christ Before Pontius Pilate

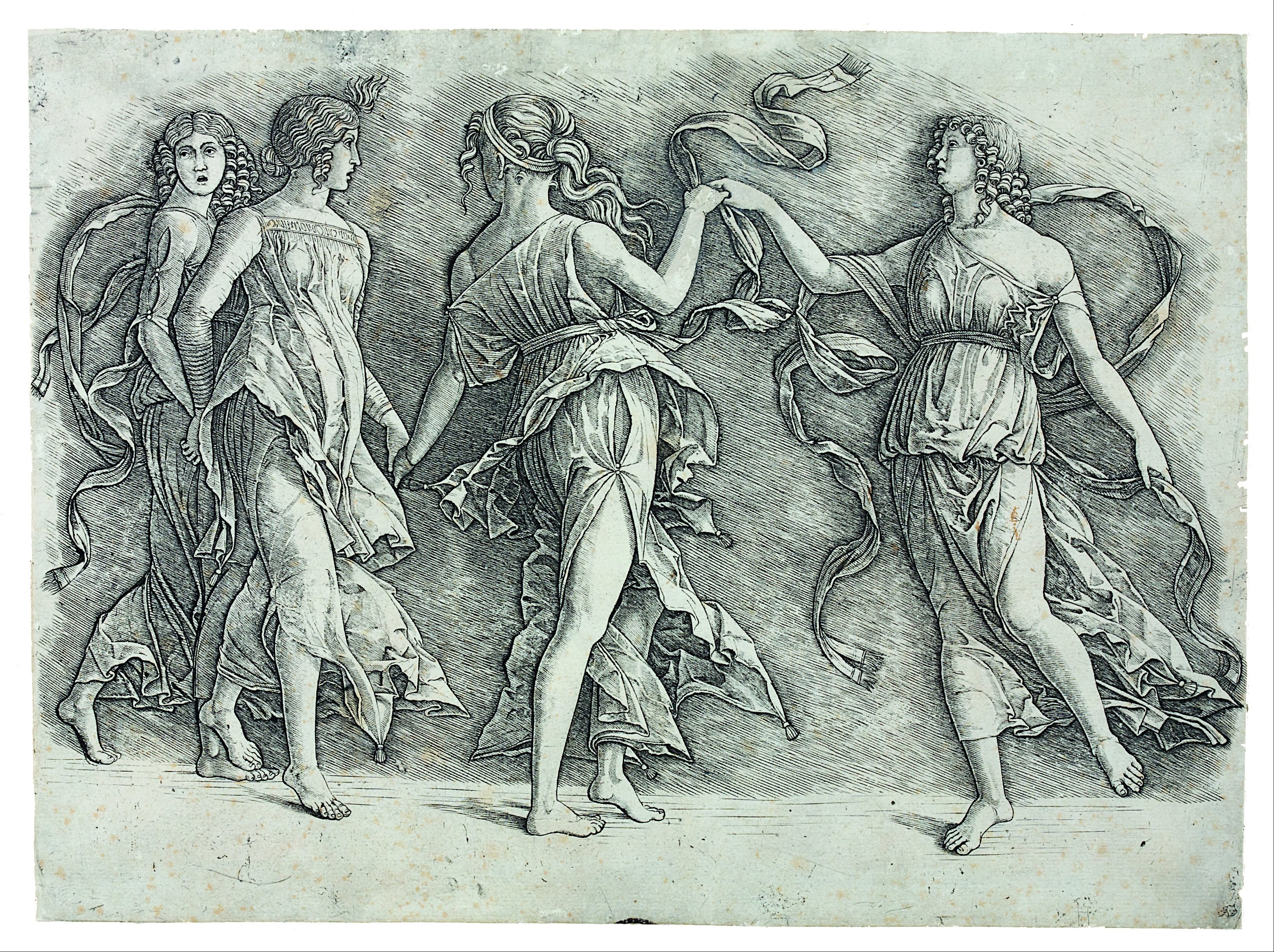
Four Dancing Muses by Zoan Andrea

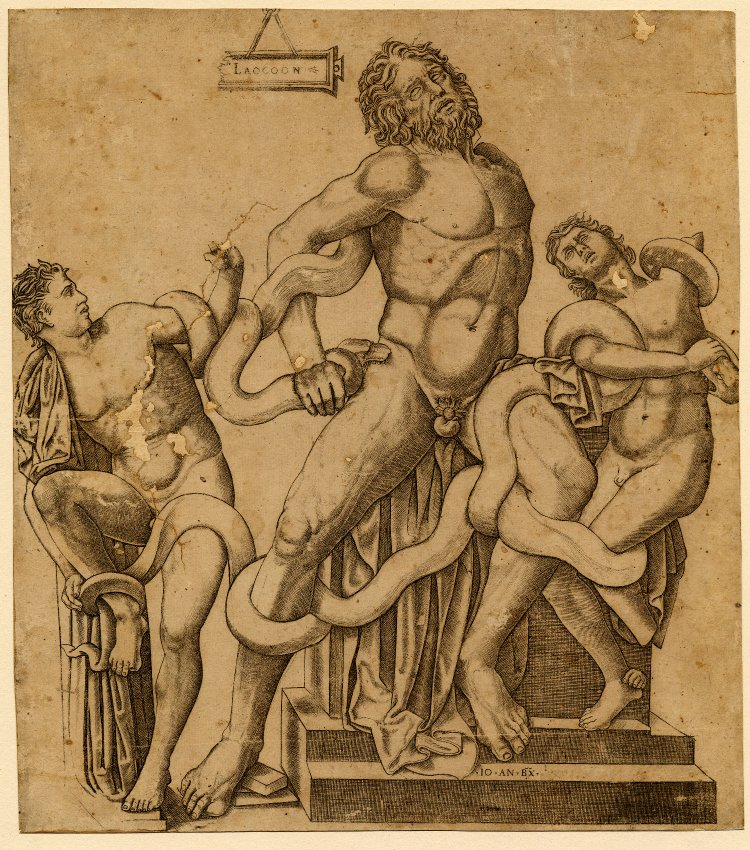
Probably the earliest print of the Laocoön Group, excavated in Rome in 1506.

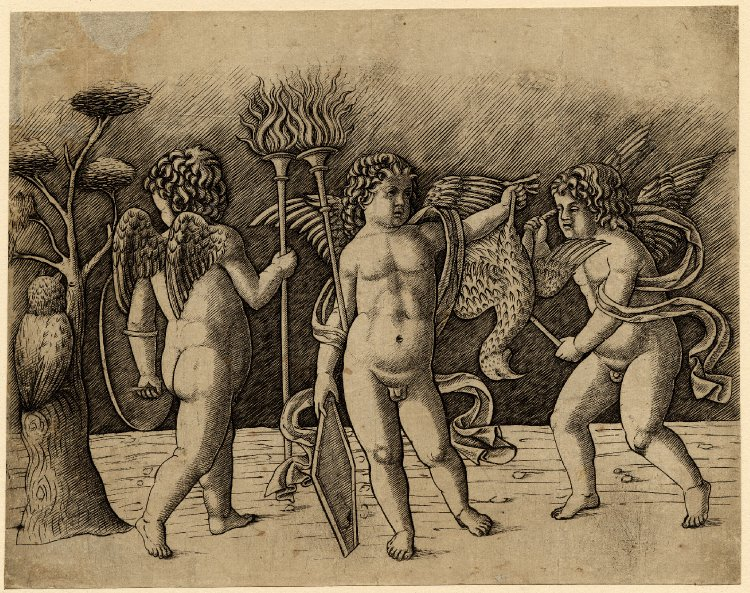
Three putti cupids
