= Benedetto Montagna =

Italian painter (c.1480–1555/58)

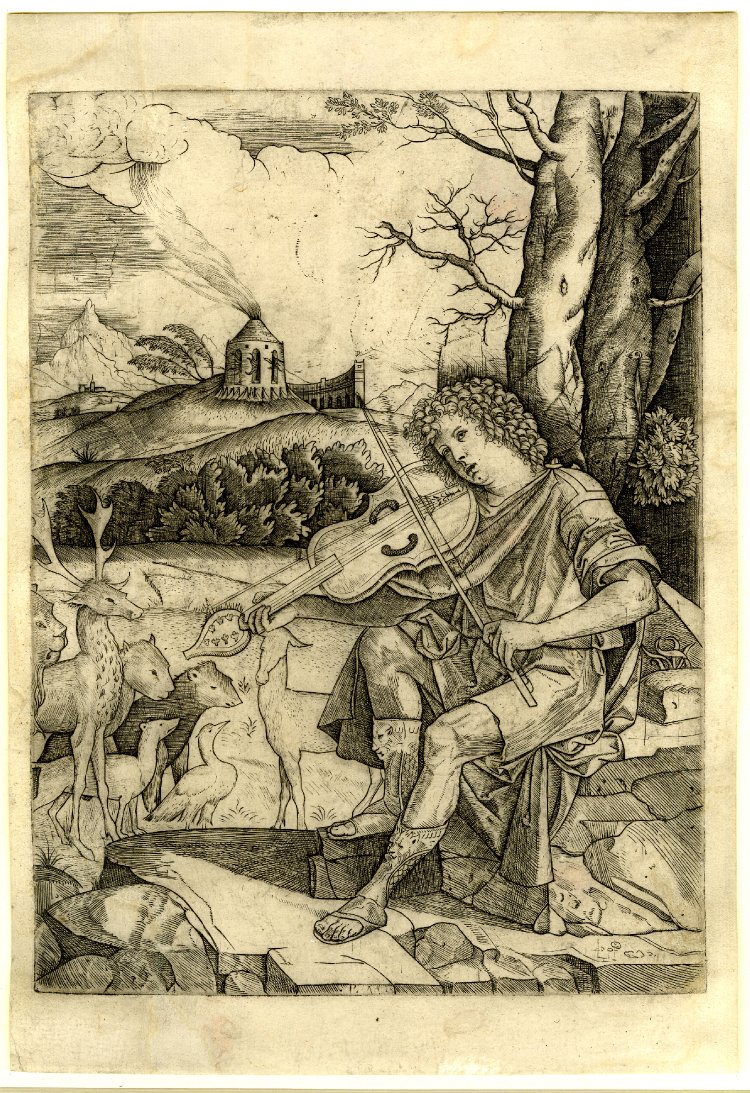
Engraving of Orpheus

Benedetto Montagna (c. 1480–1555/58) was an Italian engraver and painter. Montagna was born in Vicenza, the son of the leading painter of the city, Bartolomeo Montagna, with whom he trained and perhaps continued to work. His approximately 53 engravings seem to have been produced in the period from about 1500 until his father died in 1523 and he inherited the workshop; in these years he was "the most prolific engraver of his generation in northern Italy". He ran the workshop into at least the 1540s, but his paintings fell behind the development of Italian styles as they largely follow his father's style, less successfully. Many do not survive. His prints are generally found more significant by art historians.

He engraved primarily subjects from classical mythology, with a middle period with many religious subjects in about 1506–12.

== Life ==
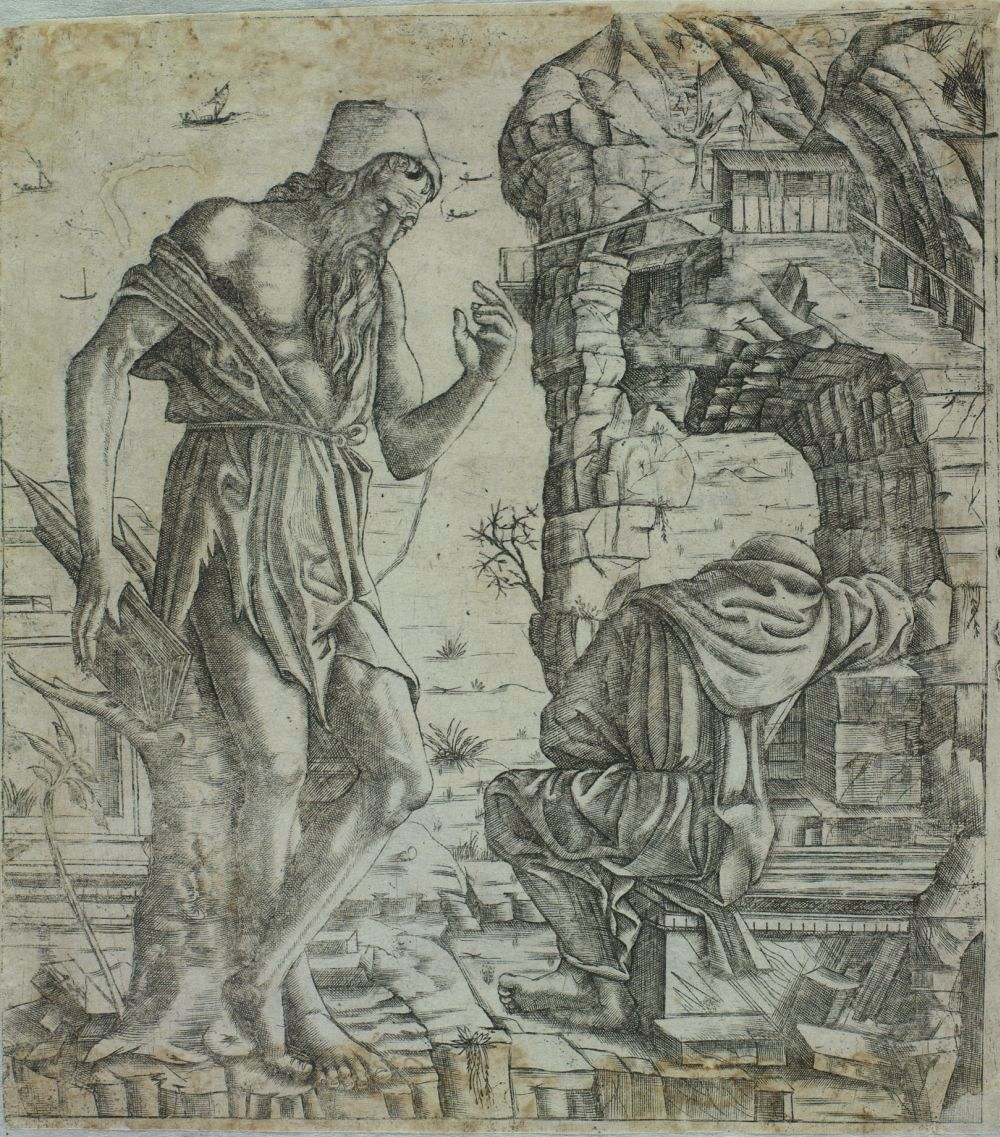
St Paul the Hermit sees the death of St Anthony the Abbot, engraving

He was given a power of attorney for his father in 1504, suggesting a birth date around 1480. His father was paid in 1517 for some painting Benedetto did in the Palazzo del Podestà, Vicenza, seat of the chief magistrate; Vicenza had long been a territory of the Venetian Republic. Otherwise, his earliest documented works are frescos, which have not survived, for a chapel in Padua, painted in 1522. His father's wills of 1521 and 1523 reveal that he was not then married but had an illegitimate son. When his father died in 1523, Benedetto took over the workshop. He may already have ceased to make engravings by this point. His last documented painting is from 1541, and he had certainly died by 4 April 1558.

A statue of the Madonna and Child in the Louvre has been attributed to him. The painter Giovanni Speranza, briefly mentioned by Vasari, was a collaborator, who was perhaps some years older.

In 2004 there was an exhibition on the work of the two Montagnas, father and son, held in Palladio's Villa Caldogno near Vicenza.

== Prints ==
His prints are mostly relatively small, with the longest side rarely more than about 200 mm or 8 inches. The figures are often smaller relative to the overall size than in other contemporary Italian prints. Most of his prints are prominently signed with his full name, unlike the initials or monograms used by many printmakers of this period. Like Giulio Campagnola, the obtrusive signatures reveal "a remarkable willingness to intrude upon an image for the sake of self-promotion". In all, 47 of his prints are signed or carry his initials.

Many of his prints borrow elements from the work of his father, or other artists, mostly via their prints. Like other Italian printmakers in this period, his technique and especially his landscape backgrounds are heavily influenced by Albrecht Dürer. These influences are apparent throughout the development of his prints, whose rough chronological sequence is agreed, and some prints are direct copies of their works, or nearly so. As his style develops, influences from Giulio Campagnola, Girolamo Mocetto, and Marcantonio Raimondi appear. In turn, Montagna influenced Mocetto, Nicoletto da Modena and Giovanni Antonio da Brescia.

His prints include seven, from about 1515–20, that are close reworkings of some of the woodcut illustrations in an edition of Ovid's Metamorphoses in Italian published in Venice in 1497. The Birth of Adonis (see gallery) is an eighth Ovidian print not using this source; as in many prints with mythological subjects, the two women wear essentially contemporary dress (compare the figures in the print of Europa). Examples of common northern subjects that were very rare in Italian printmaking of the period are an engraving of a soldier, and one of peasants fighting.

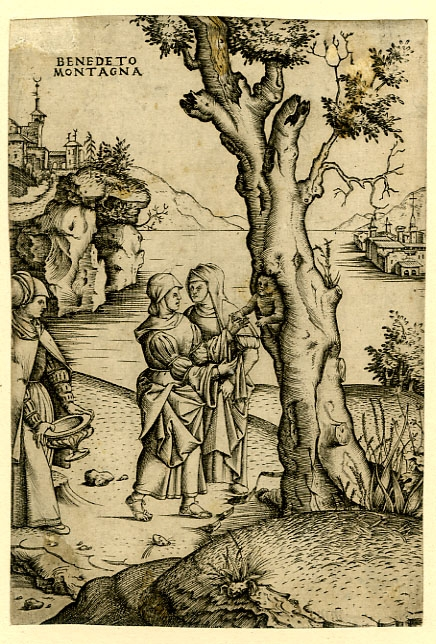
The Birth of Adonis, who emerges from a tree assisted by two women

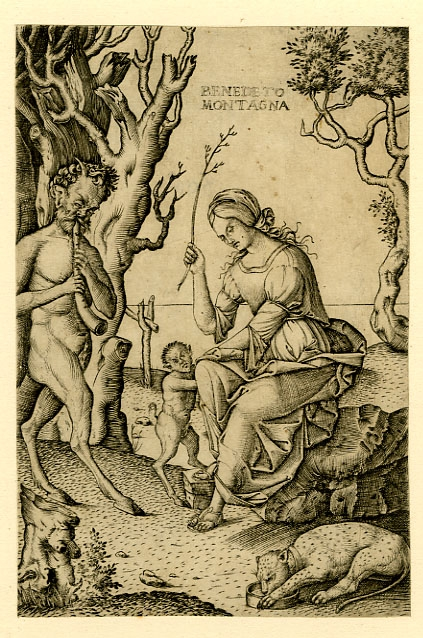
A satyr family

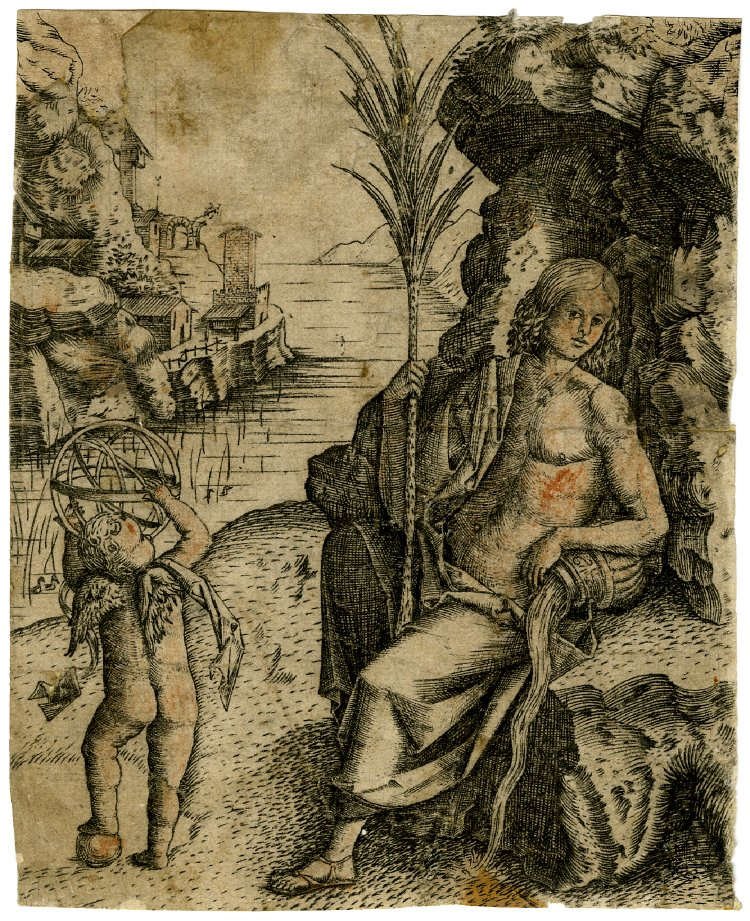
A river god seated with a flowing urn, and a winged genius beside him

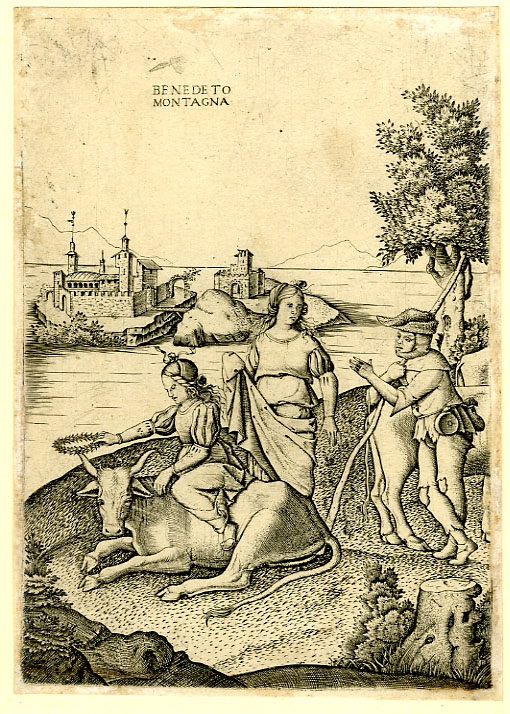
The Rape of Europa, who prepares to sit on the bull which is being crowned by a companion

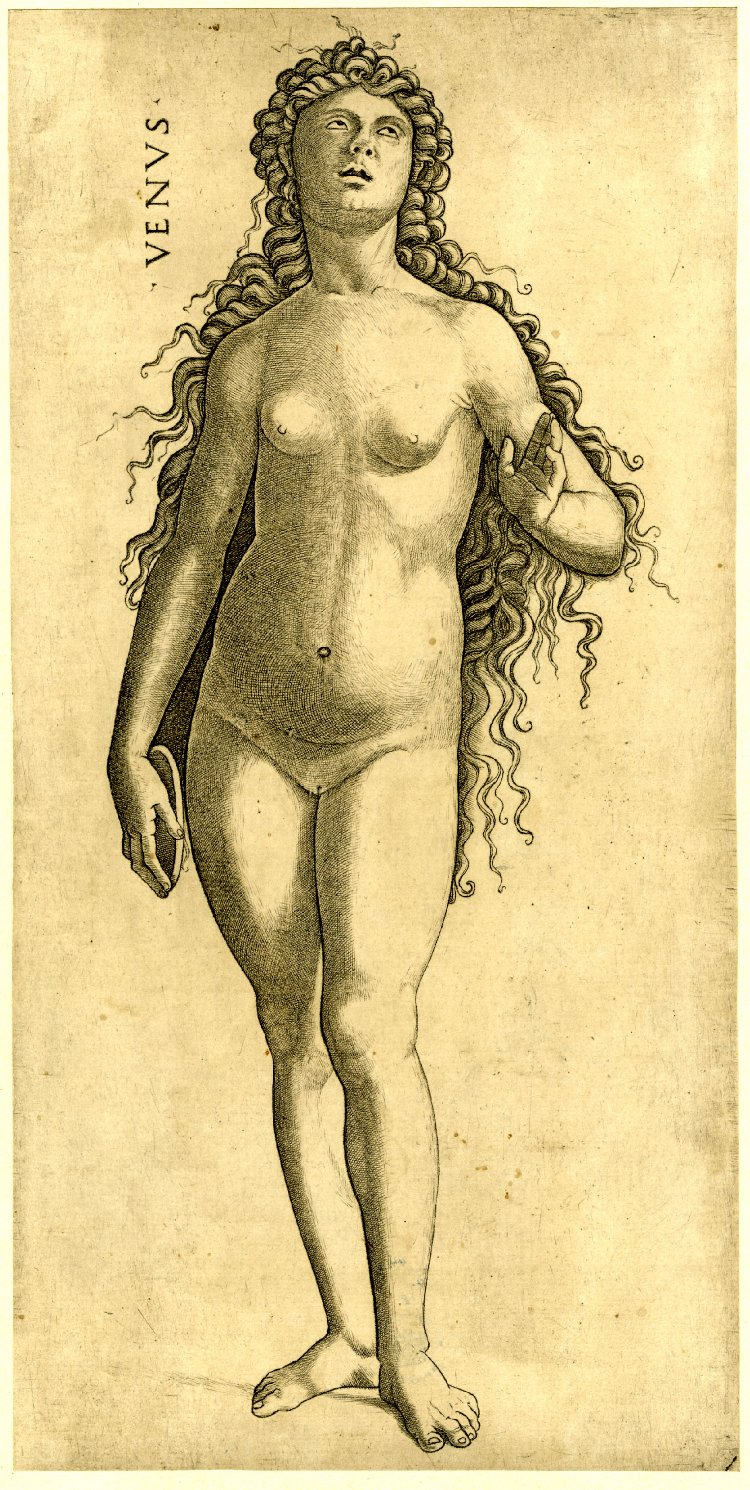
Venus

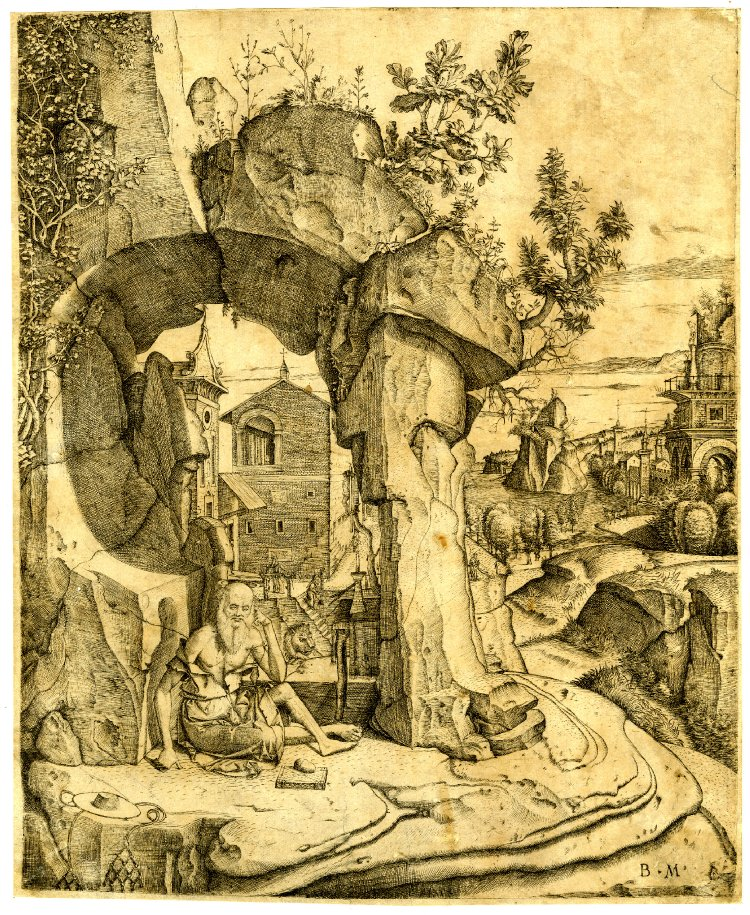
St Jerome seated beneath an arch of rock

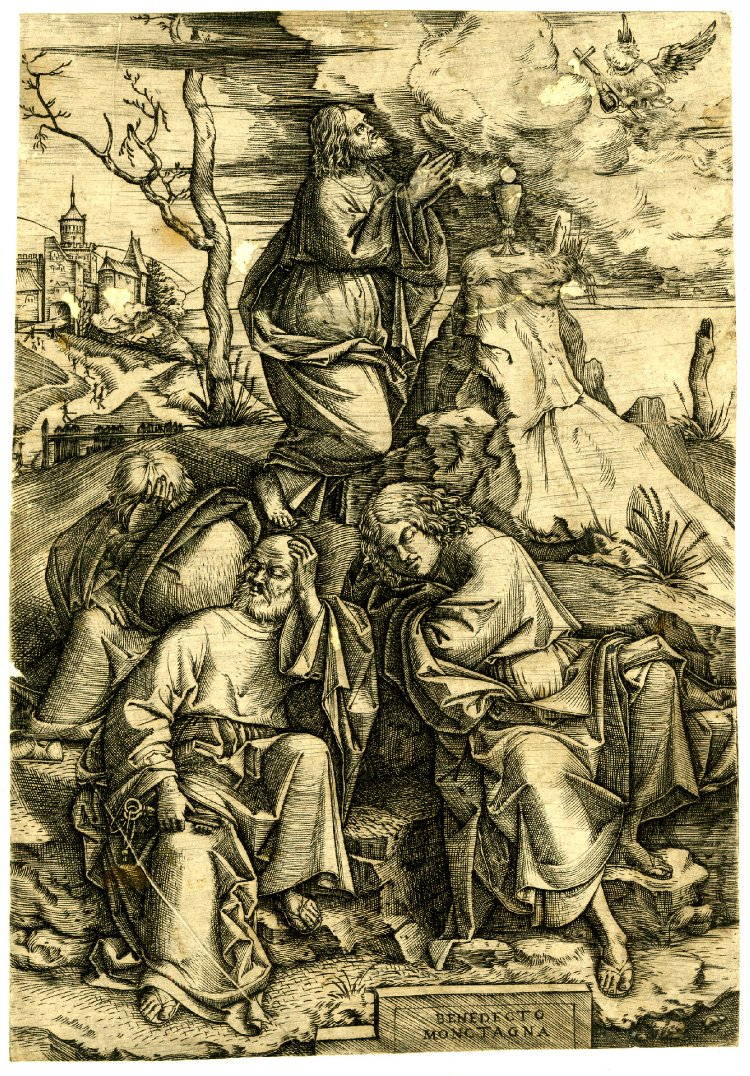
The Agony in the Garden, c. 1506-07

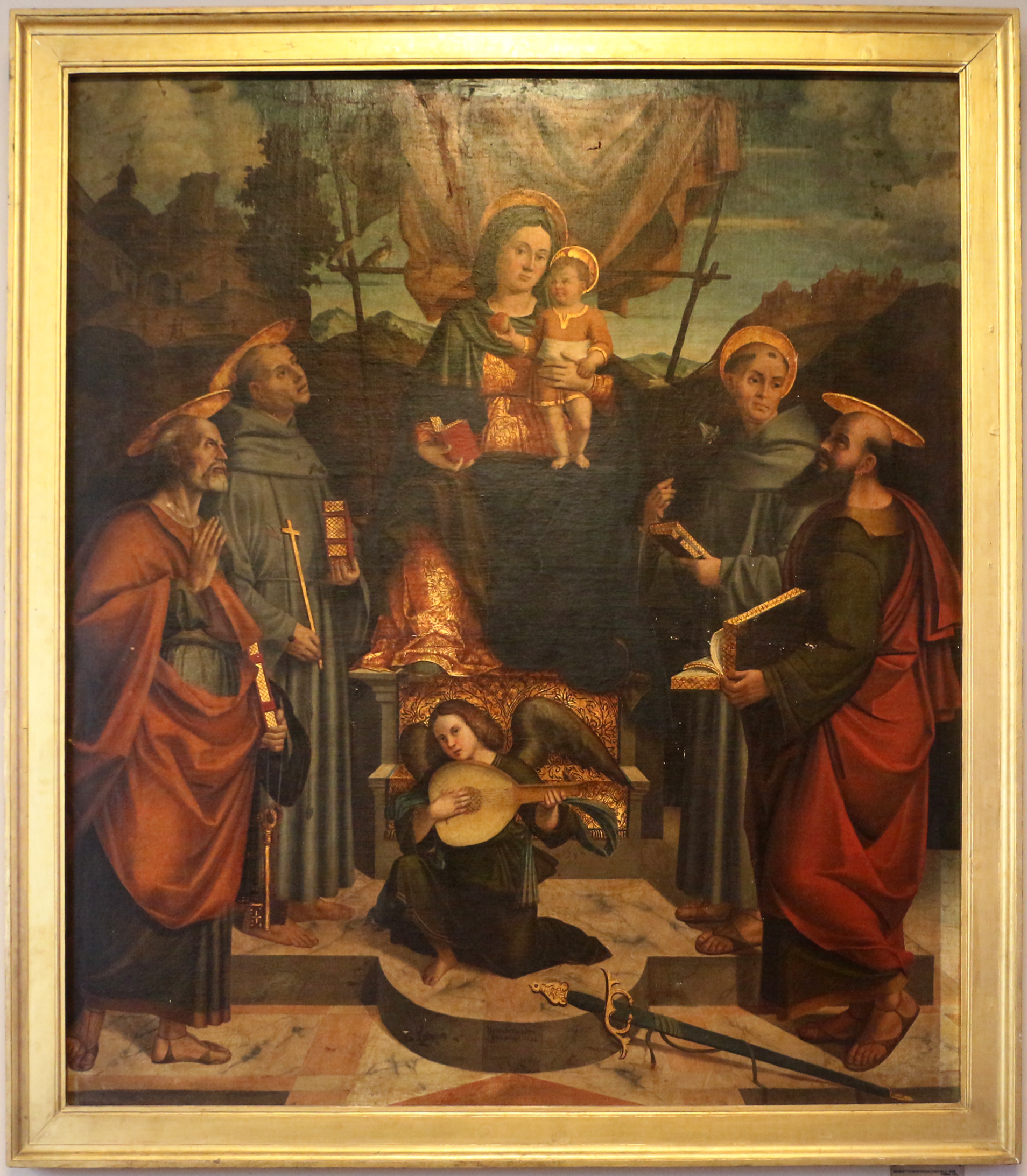
Madonna with Saints, painting
