= Giovanni Speranza de' Vajenti =

Italian painter

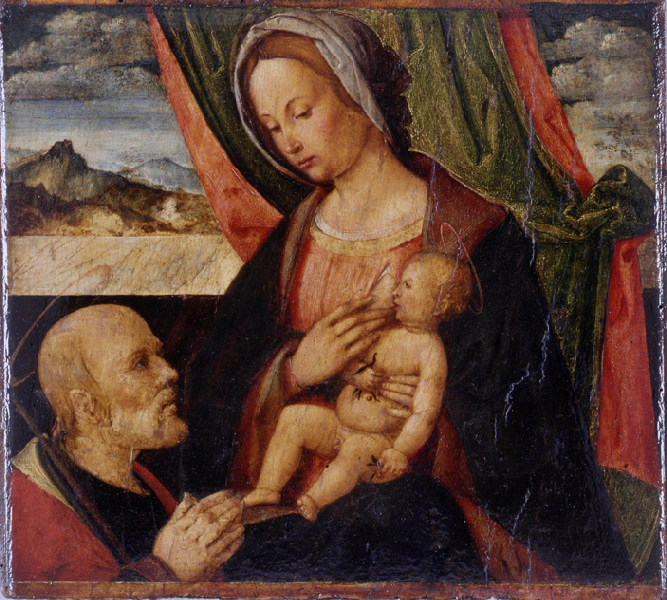
Holy Family (Musée des Beaux-Arts de Strasbourg)

Giovanni Speranza (c. 1470 – 1540s) was an Italian painter. He was born and was active in Vicenza, where he was a follower of Benedetto Montagna. His exact birth and death years are not confirmed with one claiming he was born in 1480 and died in 1546.

He is mentioned briefly by Giorgio Vasari, in his entry on Jacopo Sansovino. He later claims both Montagna and Speranza were pupils of Andrea Mantegna. It is unclear if he is related to the Baroque painter Giovanni Battista Speranza.
