= Tatakua =

Traditional Paraguayan rustic oven

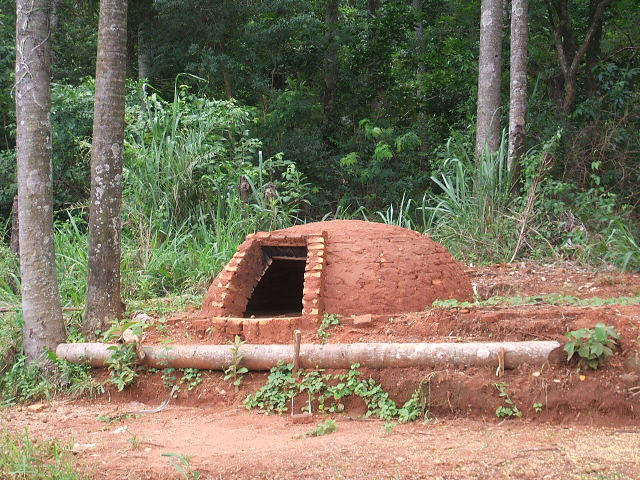
A tatakua, made of brick and red clay.

A tatakua (Guarani: tatakua; Spanish: tatacuá) is a traditional Paraguayan rustic oven, made of vaulted structure, built of bricks and a mixture of mud and molasses on a solid stone base, whose construction is specially designed for the preparation of typical food such as chipa, Paraguayan soup, chipa guasu, etc.

== Background ==
The word tatakua comes from the Guarani word "tatakua", literally, "fire hole" - from the nouns tata, "fire" and kua, "hole". Originally, the Guarani people used the nests of a certain kind of ant (takuru), which used its excrement mixed with soil and saliva, resulting in solid and resistant nests, which could reach up to two and a half meters in height.

In Paraguay, it is traditionally used in Easter celebrations, where it is generally used for cooking chipa. Currently, it is possible to acquire it prefabricated and in several varieties and sizes.
