= Pamplona (dish) =

Uruguayan meat dish

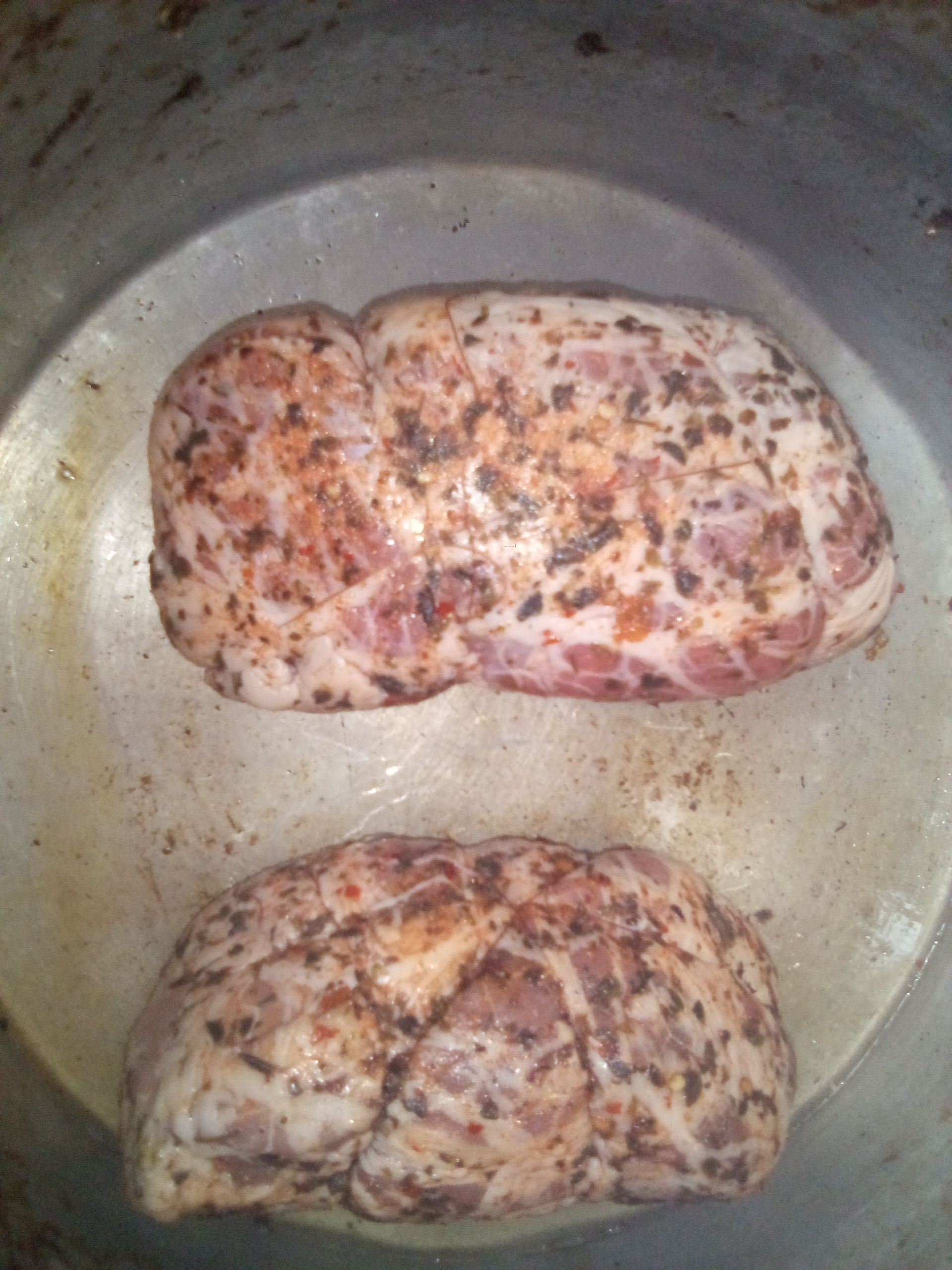
raw pamplonas in a pan, note the pork tissue

The Pamplona (also referred to as Pamplona de cerdo) is a grilled stuffed-meat dish from Uruguay prepared with chicken, and may be prepared with other meats such as pork and beef. It has also become increasingly popular in Argentina.

The traditional Pamplona is of chicken breast rolled with ham, cheese and peppers, tightly bound into a large sausage shape about 12–15 cm in diameter. The Pamplona may be grilled on a parilla as part of an asado. Beef or pork pamplonas or pamplonas with different fillings are also prepared.

Some variants include bacon strips around the main roll. Since March 3, 2013, the National Chivito and Pamplona Festival has been celebrated in Punta del Este.

== See also ==
- Chorizo de Pamplona – a sausage that is typical in the cuisine of the Navarre region of Spain
