= Portuguese assado =

Assado is a roasted fish dish in Portugal served with a Portuguese sausage (linguiça or chouriço), chopped bacon or presunto, and chopped onions. The two most common fish used are salmon and cod.
