= Bartolomeo Montagna =

Italian painter (c. 1450–1523)

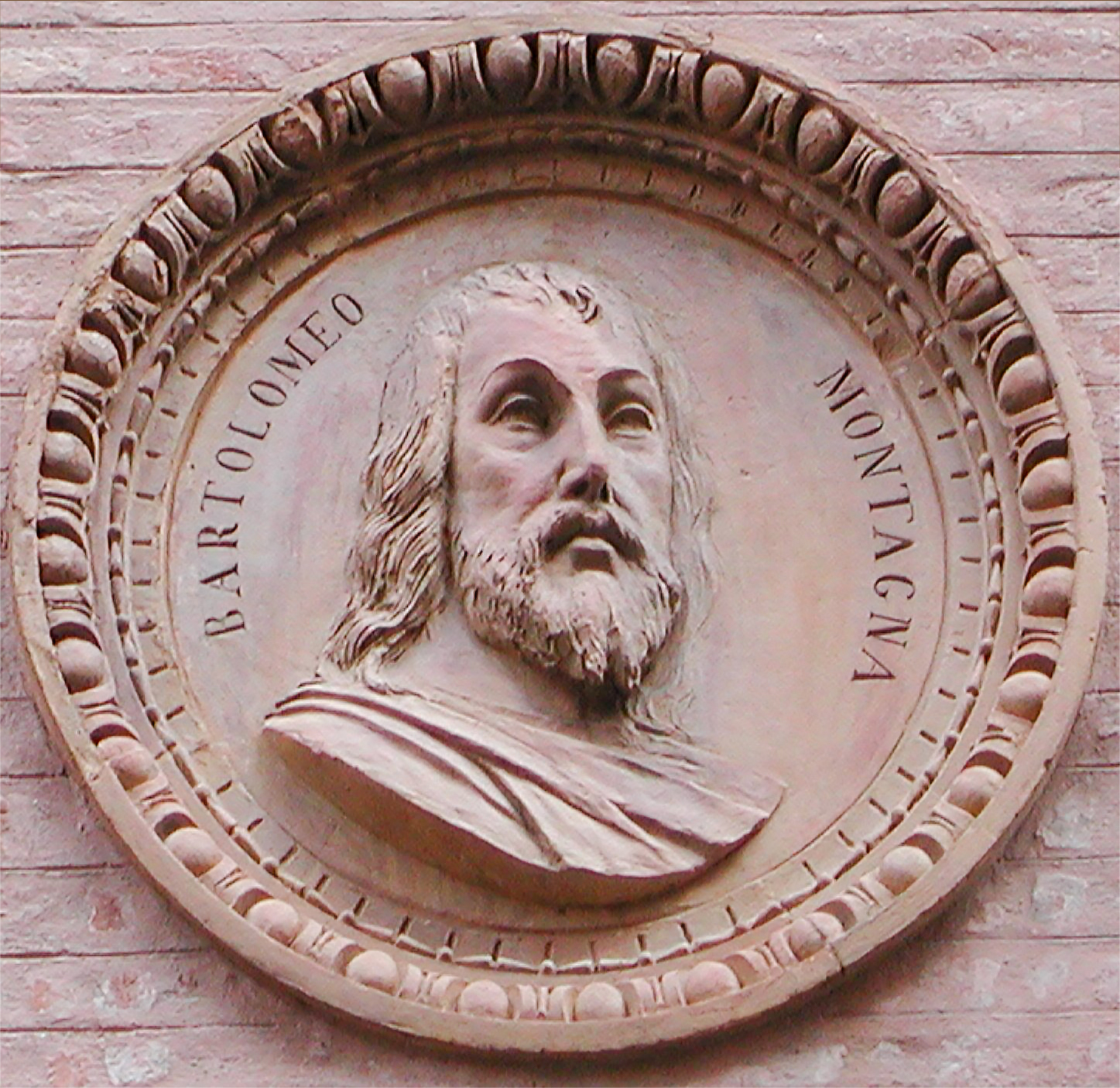
Relief of Bartolomeo Montagna on the Palazzo Thiene in Vicenza

Bartolomeo (or Bartolommeo) Montagna (UK: /mɒnˈtɑːnjə/, US: /mənˈ-/, Italian: [bartolo(m)ˈmɛːo monˈtaɲɲa]; 1450?– 11 October 1523) was an Italian Renaissance painter who mainly worked in Vicenza. He also produced works in Venice, Verona, and Padua. He is most famous for his many Madonnas and his works are known for their soft figures and depiction of eccentric marble architecture. He is considered to be heavily influenced by Giovanni Bellini, in whose workshop he might have worked around 1470. Benedetto Montagna, a productive engraver, was his son and pupil and active until about 1540. He was mentioned in Vasari's Lives as a student of Andrea Mantegna but this is widely contested by art historians.

== Life ==
He was born Bartolomeo Cincani and later changed his name to Bartolomeo Montagna. The first known written record of his existence is from 1459 and lists him as a minor. The first known documentation of him as an adult is in 1480 as a witness of a will. Differences in two documents regarding his father's property from 1467 and 1469 imply he became an adult between those two years. Because of the lack of formal documentation of his birth and confusion on the age of legal adulthood in Vicenza at that time, there is much debate as to his actual birthdate. Some scholars have agreed on close to 1450 while others place him closer to 1453-1454.

His family originated in Brescia, Italy and later moved to Biron around 1450 before settling in Vicenza sometime by 1460. His brother, Baldissera, was a goldsmith. For most of his life through his death he was a resident of Vicenza and lived in a house he purchased directly across from the Church of San Lorenzo in 1484. From 1469-1475 Montagna was in Venice before returning to Vicenza and starting his career as a painter. In 1509, he moved from Vicenza to Padua likely due to the war in Vicenza, and remained there until 1514.

The identity of his wife is unknown, but they had three sons. One of his sons, Benedetto Montagna, was also an artist famous for his engravings. His other two sons, Filippo and Paolo are mentioned in some contracts but absent from his will. Bartolomeo Montagna died on October 11, 1523. He left the majority of his possessions and his practice to his son, Benedetto.

== Career ==
Because the birthdate of Montagna is unknown, there is also debate as to when exactly he began his career and how old he was at the time. Throughout his career, his works are characterized by a simple, laconic nature. His figures often appear solemn and plastic in form.

=== Early works (1480s–1499) ===
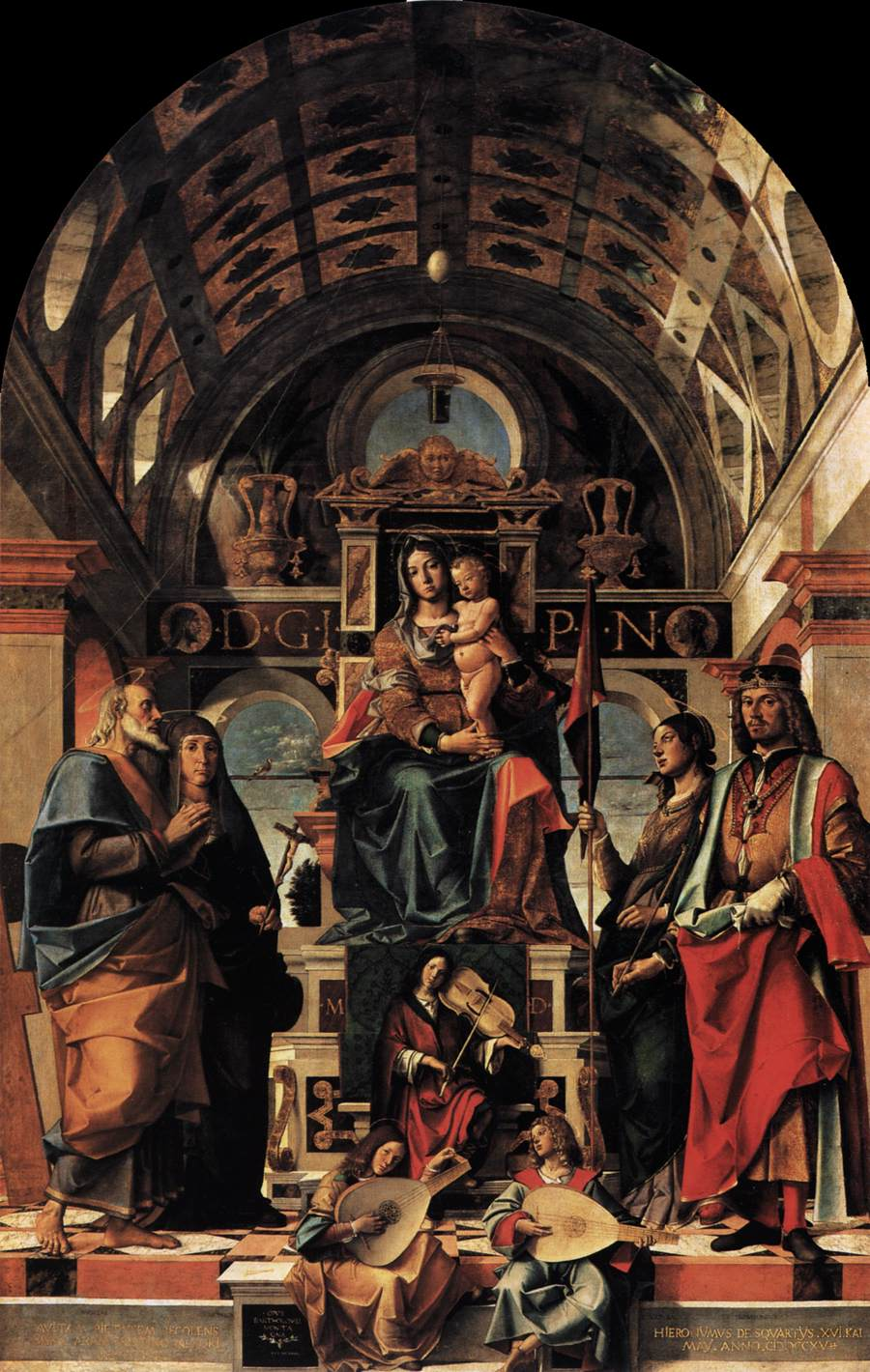
Madonna and Child Enthroned with Saints from San Michele (c. 1497-1499)

His first known documented commission was for two paintings for the Scuola Grande di San Marco in Venice. The paintings were contracted to depict the Deluge (flood myth) and another scene from Genesis, however their final status is unknown as they were destroyed in a fire in 1485. The next known record of Montagna's work is for an altarpiece in the hospital of Vicenza, of which the current whereabouts are also unknown.

His first extant painting is from September 1487 (as inscribed on the back of the work) for a painting of The Virgin and Child with Saint Sebastian and Roch. A small work intended for private use, it depicts the figures in a marble enclosure with a Vicentine landscape in the background. This painting also shows Montagna's first known use of trachyte marble, a unique texture of marble, which is seen in most of his works. Around this time, he was also commissioned to do the high altarpiece of San Bartolomeo of Vicenza, of which the exact date is often debated. This shows influences from multiple works of Giovanni Bellini located Venice that are also undated. In 1490 he painted an altarpiece for the Certosa di Pavia showing the Virgin and Child Enthroned with Saint John the Baptist and Jerome. In 1491 he painted the altarpiece, the semi-dome, and other wall frescos for the oratory dedicated to St. Blaise at the church of Santi Nazaro e Celso in Verona. The semidome depicts St. Blaise with companions and the walls depict other scenes from the legends of St. Blaise. These works are noted for their realistic gaunt figures. From 1497-1499 he was paid monthly to work on an altarpiece for the Squarzi family. His final payment was in the form of a piece of property which he kept until 1503. This was located in a chapel in the Church of San Michele and entitled Madonna and Child Enthroned with Saints. The outlines of this painting are very bold compared to his other works and it features detailed drapery.

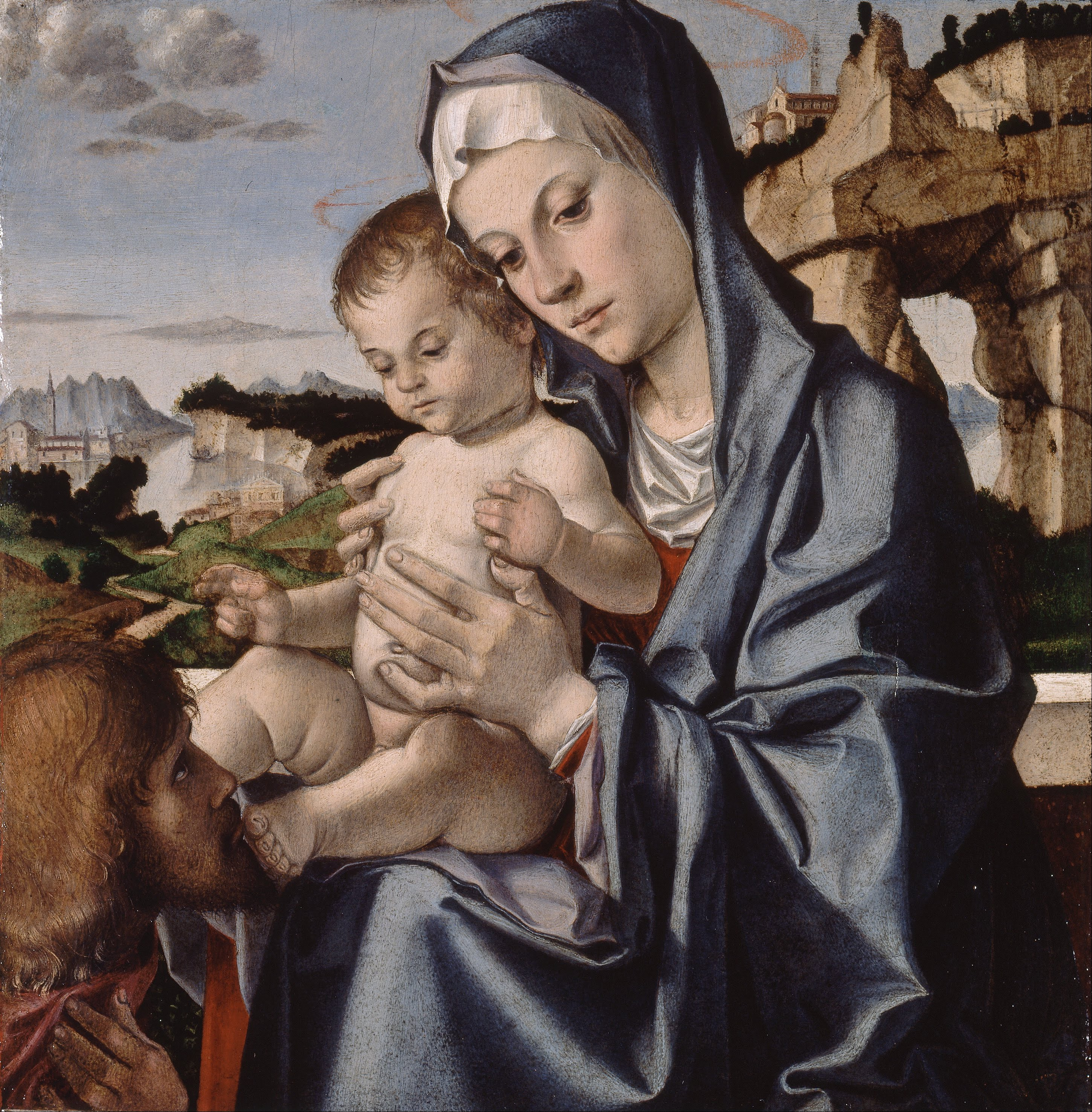
The Virgin and Child with a Saint (c. 1483) - Showing Montagna's signature positioning of the Virgin's Hand

His early works are generally characterized by the use of trachyte marble architecture and a particular positioning of the Virgin's hand, showing the middle and ring-finger touching and widely separated from the index and pinky finger. They also are usually distinguished by their symmetry, organization, equally distributed light, and plastic-like quality to the figures.

=== Maturity (1499–1507) ===
An altarpiece in San Michele at Vicenza (Virgin and Child with Four Saints and Music-making Angels) from 1499 is considered by many art historians to be a turning point in Montagna's style. This development in his style is characterized by change in tone and use of warmer and richer colors. This particular painting depicts an outdoor scene and is a variation of a work by Giovanni Bellini. Around this time he also completed another Bellinesque altarpiece for San Bartolomeo in Vicenza, Madonna and Child with Saint Monica and Mary. In 1500 Montagna completed a Pieta in the Church of the Madonna del Monte. The painting depicts the Virgin Mary holding Christ's dead body and Mary Magdalen kissing his feet. They are flanked by St. John and St. Joseph. This features dull color and the use continuous lines as a compositional element, a growing trend in renaissance paintings. This painting is characterized by a less rigid form than Montagna's previous works. In the same year he also completed the Virgin and St. Joseph Adoring Christ in the Church of Orgiano. This depicts the infant Jesus sitting upright, flanked by the soft figures of the Virgin and St. Joseph.

Around this time the Bishop of Vicenza, Cardinal Battista Zeno, also commissioned Montagna to create a painting of the Virgin and Child with Eight Saints for the Cathedral of Vicenza. This work was lost after 1779 but is documented in multiple records. In 1504 Montagna travelled to Verona to complete frescos for the choir and vaults of the Cappella di San Biagio depicting many scenes of St. Blaise. Due to the success of this work, in 1507 he was commissioned to do the altarpiece for the Church of San Sebastiano in Verona, depicting the Virgin and Child Enthroned with St. Sebastian and St. Jerome. This work is characterized by brightly colored architecture, an oddly shaped throne, and elaborate outfits. After returning to Vicenza, Montagna completed a painting of Madonna between Saint Anthony and John the Evangelists for San Lorenzo. This is often considered the height of Montagna's paintings.

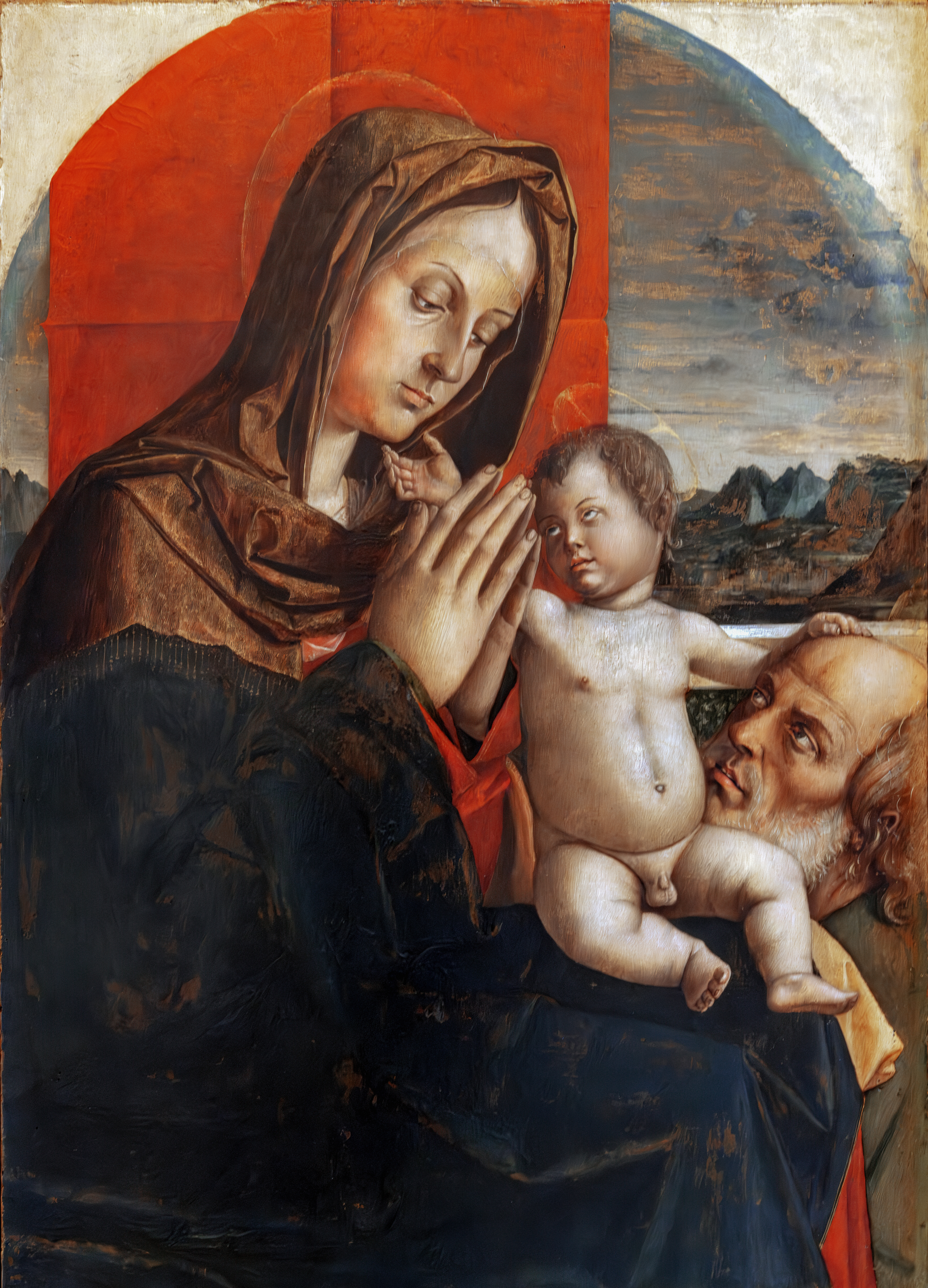
Example of a late work of Montagna, Madonna and Child with Saint Joseph (c. 1520, tempera/canvas)

Montagna's style at this time is noted for its eccentric qualities despite the trend of a more mellow style that was adopted by his peers. His paintings frequently featured bright colors, decorative architecture, detailed drapery, and sharp angles. Despite the bright colors and sharp angles, the human figures pictured in them were often fuller and softer.

=== Late works (1507–1522) ===
The last known dated painting of Montagna's is from 1507 although there are many paintings that have been dated by scholars after this time. Paintings from the last 15 years of his life are often considered a decline from the height of his career. His style was noticeably different in the years he spent in Padua (1509-1514), showing more landscapes, sunsets and warm colors incorporated with his signature architecture look. His style was more inconsistent, but often included fuller figures, deep shadows and less angular details. Examples of works Montagna's time in Padua featuring this style are the Exhumation of St. Anthony for the Scuola di San Antonio and the Virgin and Child with Four Saints in Saint Maria in Vanzo. In 1517 Montagna returned to Vicenza. In 1522 he was commissioned by the Scuola di San Giuseppe to paint an altarpiece for Cologna Veneta. This depicts the Virgin, Child, 3 shepherds, and St. Joseph and St. Sebastian.

== Influences ==
There is no written record of Montagna's training as a painter but there are many speculations and debates about his influences. In the second edition of Vasari's Lives, Vasari mentions that Montagna learned to draw from Andrea Mantegna but does not specify if he did this as an actual pupil or if he just privately studied Mantegna's works. It is generally agreed on that Montagna was influenced by Giovanni Bellini, Antonello da Messina, and Alvise Vivarni. It is generally accepted that Bellini had the most prolific influence on Montagna's works, but to whether he was actually a pupil of any of these artists and in what order is highly debated. Montagna's use of intricate and angular drapery is linked to the works of Vivarni. His works inspired by Antonello are characterized by rounded forms whereas those inspired by Bellini feature thinner and sharper figures. His transition to use of brighter and richer colorings later in life are also attributed to Bellini's influence. A drawing with a previously mistranslated note was attributed to Montagna, but has now been identified as a gift from Bellini to Montagna. This still however does not confirm Bellini as Montagna's master as it was common among artists of the renaissance to gift each other drawings. Many of Montagna's paintings borrow compositions from these mentioned artists, a common practice in Italian renaissance painting.

== List of works ==
Permanent collections that hold works by Bartolomeo Montagna

- Cristo Benedicente (1502) - Musei Reali (Torino)
- Madonna and Child (c. 1490-1510) - Rijksmuseum, Amsterdam
- Madonna and Child (c. 1485-1523) - Walters Art Museum, Baltimore
- Virgin Enthroned, with the Child Jesus and Saint Jerome and John the Baptist (c. 1490) - Museo della Certosa di Pavia
- Madonna and Child; Madonna and Child - Musei Civici, Belluno
- Virgin, Jesus and Several Saints; Virgin and Child; St Jerome; St Sebastian and St Roch - Accademia Carrara, Bergamo
- Virgin Enthroned, with the Child Jesus and Two Saints (1515); Resurrected Christ and Mary Magdalene - Berlin State Museums, Berlin

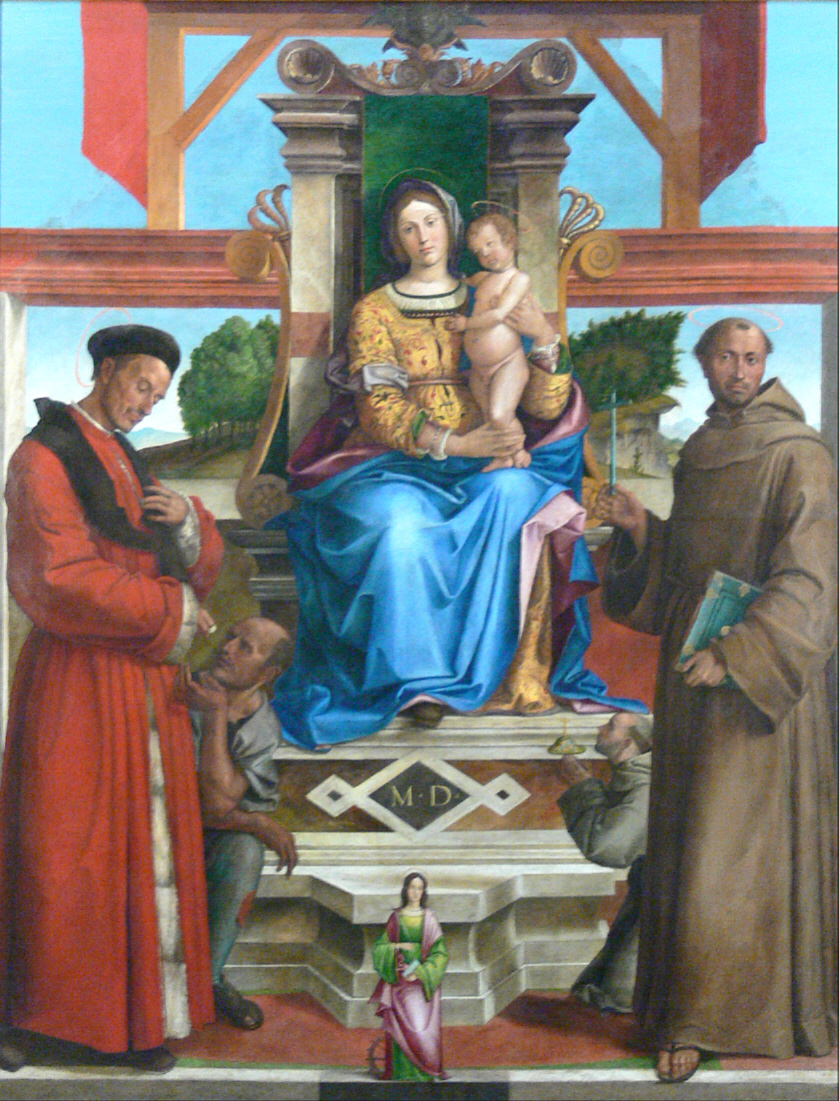
Bartolomeo Montagna: Virgin Enthroned, with the Child Jesus and Two Saints (1515), c. 1515 (Bode-Museum, Berlin)

- Head and Hands of a Praying Madonna - Bremen
- Saint Sebastian (pen and brown ink/paper) - Fitzwilliam Museum, Cambridge
- Virgin and the Child Jesus on a Throne - Glasgow
- The Virgin and Child with a Saint (c. 1483-1499) - Walker Art Gallery, Liverpool
- Holy Family (c. 1500, oil/wood)- Courtauld Gallery, London
- Holy Family (c. 1500, oil/wood)- Pavia Civic Museums, Pavia
- Saint Zeno, Saint John the Baptist and a Female Martyr (c. 1495, oil/wood/canvas); The Virgin and Child (c. 1485-1487, tempera/wood);The Virgin and Child (c. 1504-1506, oil/wood/canvas) - National Gallery, London
- Saint Jerome; Saint Paul - Museo Poldi Pezzoli, Milan
- Virgin with the Child and Saints (1498, oil/canvas); Saint Jerome (c. 1500, oil/canvas) - Pinacoteca di Brera, Milan
- Madonna Adoring the Child (oil/wood); Saint Justina of Padua (c. 1490-1500, fragment oil/wood) - Metropolitan Museum of Art, New York City
- Saint Jerome in Penitence - National Gallery of Canada, Ottawa
- Christ Carrying the Cross (c. 1503, oil/wood); The Incident in the Story of the Vestal Claudia (tempera/wood), The Marriage of Antiochus and Stratonice (c. 1490-1495, tempera/wood), The Virgin and Child (c. 1480-1489, tempera/wood) - Ashmolean Museum of Art and Archaeology - University of Oxford, Oxford
- Ecce Homo (c. 1500, oil/wood); Three Children Playing Musical Instruments - Louvre, Paris
- Adoration of the Child Jesus - Musée des Beaux-Arts, Strasbourg

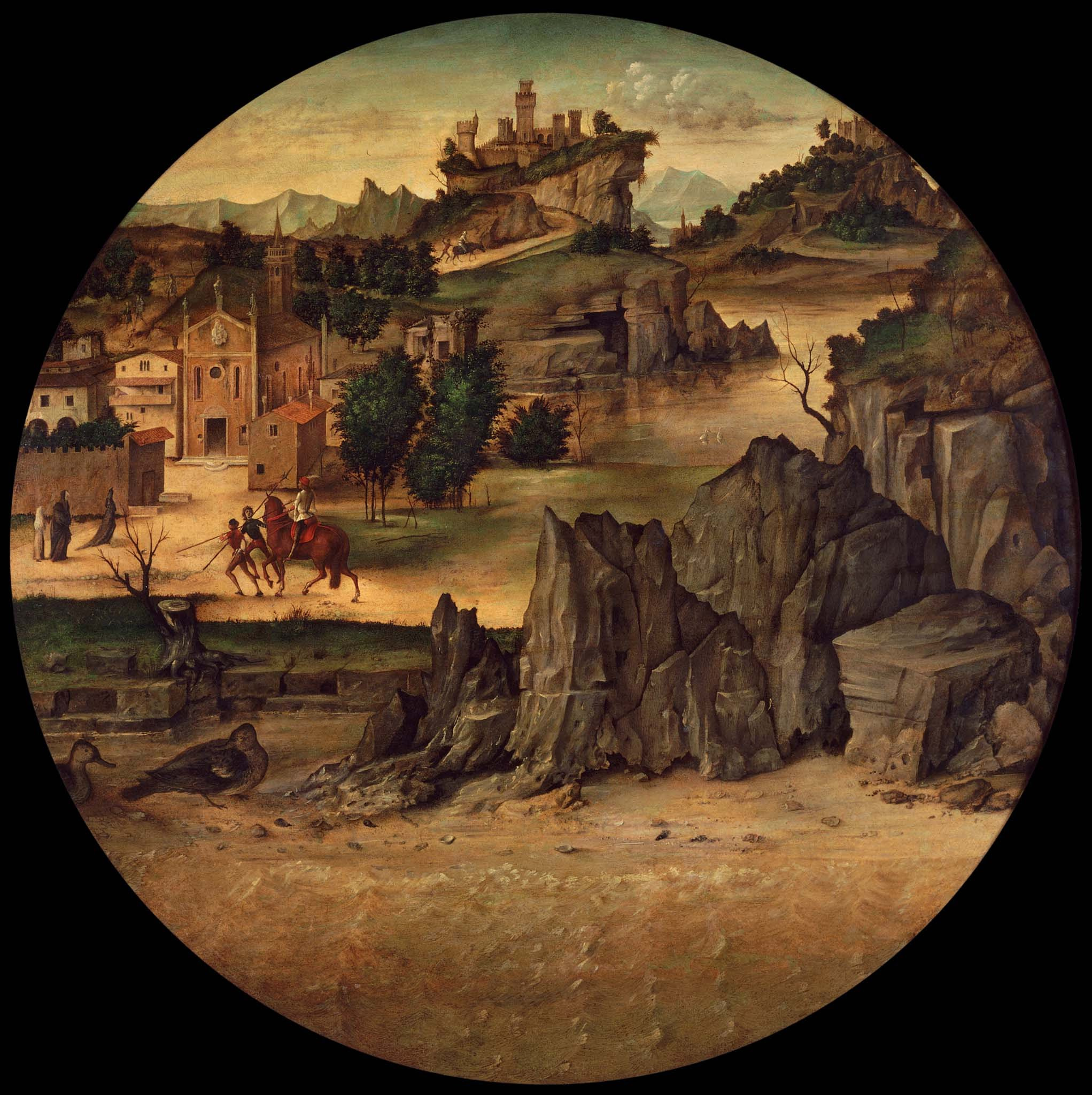
Landscape with Castle (c. 1495-1505, oil/wood)

- Landscape with Castle (c. 1495-1505, oil/wood) - National Museum of Western Art, Tokyo
- Jesus between Saint Roch and Saint Sebastian; Madonna with Saint Sebastian and Saint Jerome - Venice
- Madonna and Child with Saint Joseph (c. 1520, tempera/canvas) - Museo Correr, Venice
- Saint Peter Blessing with a Donor (c. 1505, oil/wood) - Gallerie dell'Accademia, Venice
- Madonna and Child - Musei Civici, Verona
- Maria Vergine col Bambino tra le sante Lucia e Maddalena (altar painting) - Vicenza Cathedral, Vicenza
- Madonna with the Child and Saint John; Madonna and Child; Madonna with Four Saints (oil/wood); Nativity; Madonna with Saint John and Saint Jerome; Christ Bearing the Cross (oil/wood); Madonna; Holy Family; Madonna with the Child and Saint John as a Child; Madonna and Child with Saint Monica and Mary (c. 1482, oil/wood) - Musei Civici, Vicenza
- Madonna and Child (c. 1490, oil/wood) - National Gallery of Art, Washington, D.C.
- The Virgin and Child (tempera/panel) - Worcester Art Museum, Worcester, MA
