= Vault structuring =

Vault structuring is a forming technology to generate three-dimensional rectangular or hexagonal structures in thin-walled materials such as sheet metal, plastic sheeting, cardboard and paper. It distinguishes itself from conventional sheet metal forming processes (such as embossing, beading and hydroforming) by allowing a self-organized structuring with minimal energy consumption during the forming process, which particularly offers material and energy savings. The main advantage is an increased rigidity (bending- and bulge rigidity) of vault structured materials compared to unstructured materials. Vault structured materials are products of Dr. Mirtsch GmbH and protected by numerous national and international patents.

== Basis phenomena of the rectangular vault structuring ==
In the mid-70s, Prof. Dr. Frank Mirtsch discovered the principle of the self-rigidizing effect of vault structures by an unexpected structure formation in a thin-walled cylinder.

For the basic process only a thin-walled cylinder and supporting elements (supporting rings) which are positioned on the inside surface of the cylinder are needed. When the cylinder is put under an exterior pressure, the material between the supporting rings is pushed inwards. After reaching a critical but still considerably small exterior pressure (instability point), rectangular vault structures are formed spontaneously. This effect is called in the jargon as „buckling“. The circumferential, straight folds arise by the underlying supporting elements, while the axial folds develop all by themselves (self-organization) in a staggered way without an underlying tool.

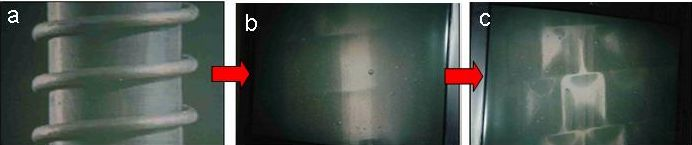

a) supporting rings b) imposed cylinder with low pressure; c) rectangular vault structure

== Evolution to the hexagonal vault structures ==
During research for enhanced vault structures a new approach had been chosen.

Evolution of hexagonal Vault structures

By softening the boundary conditions the rectangular structures evolve to hexagonal vault structures by an additional self-organization along the horizontal folds. The hexagonal vault structure offer for sheet materials an enhanced isotropic rigidity compared to the rectangular vault structures.

== Continuously working process for vault structuring ==
In analog way as the hexagonal vault structures are formed, a modification allows the structuring forming in peripheral direction. This led to the development of a continuously vault structuring process to produce plates or coils.

== Synergetic properties of Vault structured materials ==
Increased rigidity results in lower weight: Vault structures provide a multidimensional rigidity to the material against bending and bulging. Components made e.g. from metal, plastics or fibrous materials can be used - with the same functionality – to save material and weight.

Less noise by reduction of body borne noise: Compared to the unstructured material, vault structures stiffen the material and so shift the resonance frequencies towards higher frequencies. As a direct result, the unpleasant droning of thin walled components (e.g. air conditioning channels or facades) is reduced. At the same time, the vault-structured material shows enhanced acoustic damping characteristics.

Full preservation of the surface quality: Vault structuring does not only sustain the material properties by gentle deformation but also its surface quality. The source material can be equipped before structuring with a high-quality surface finish, such as painting, anodizing and marking. Surface finishing of the source material like a coil is in general more economical and environmental friendly then the treatment of the single part after the forming operation.

Design and virtually glare-free light reflection: Beside the bionic design, mirrored vault structures separate the light into many small points by reflecting on every single structure. A glare-free light reflection is generated which can beneficially be used for light reflectors or facades.

Enhanced heat- and mass transfer characteristics: Vault structures used e.g. in heat exchanger walls highly increase the heat transfer fluid flow. This increase is due to constant turbulences of the fluid on the vault structures. Because the vault structures have no sharp edges and a constant cross area at all cross sections, the pressure increases only relatively small compared to the smooth wall.

== Applications ==
The vault structure has been applied in various fields and industries

1. Washing Drum (Softtronic by Miele)
2. Facades and roof elements (Sports palace in Odessa)
3. Reflectors for the light technique (HEXAL lamp by Siteco)
4. Rigid Tubes (very thin walled synchrotron detector tube by DESY)
5. Automotive part (back panel for Mercedes SLK-class of the Daimler AG)
