= Chok =

Chok may refer to:

== Places ==
- Chok State, a former princely state in Kathiawar
  - its seat, a village in present Gujarat, western India
  - Chok River, a river in western India
- Chok, Iran, a village in Yazd Province, Iran

== People ==
- Chok people, a society that lived on the Elgeyo escarpment in Kenya
- Raymond Lam (林峯), known as "Chok王"—meaning "the King of Chok"—a Hong Kong actor and singer
  - "Chok", song from Raymond Lam's album LF
- A Chinese masculine given name, popular in Singapore:
  - Goh Chok Tong (born 1941), second Prime Minister of the Republic of Singapore
  - Lionel Chok (21st century), Singaporean film-maker and director
- Bong Kee Chok (born 1937), politician
- Chok Sukkaew (born 1987), Thai footballer
- Elvie Chok (1924–2015), Hong Kong international lawn and indoor bowler
- Ming Tung Chok, former CEO of Soyo Group
- Philip Chok, Hong Kong international lawn and indoor bowler
- Vera Chok, London-based actor and writer

== Other ==
- Chok樣 (擢樣), a popular term in Hong Kong, meaning "to forcefully make oneself look more handsome"
- CHOK, a Canadian radio station

== See also ==
- Chock (disambiguation)
