= Soyo (disambiguation) =

Soyo is a municipality and city in Zaire Province, Angola.

Soyo may also refer to:

- Soyo Group, an American electronics company
- Soyō, Kumamoto, a dissolved municipality in Kumamoto Prefecture, Japan
- Soyo (Paraguay), a Paraguayan soup
- Soyoka Yoshida, a Japanese entertainer with the stage name Soyo
- Soyo Nagasaki (長崎 そよ), a fictional character in the musical media franchise BanG Dream! and the spin-off anime series BanG Dream! It's MyGO!!!!!
- Soyombo script (ISO 15924 code: Soyo)
