= Paraguayan cuisine =

Set of dishes and culinary techniques of Paraguay

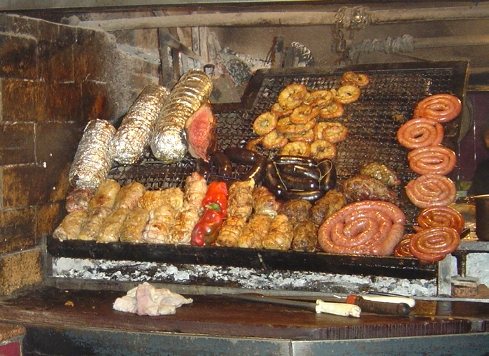
Asado with huaraches (offal) and sausages.

Paraguayan cuisine is the set of dishes and culinary techniques of Paraguay. It has a marked influence of the Guaraní people combined with the Spanish cuisine and other marked influences coming from the immigration received by bordering countries such as Italian cuisine and German cuisine. The city of Asunción is the epicenter of the distinctive gastronomy that extends in current Paraguay and its areas of influence, which is the reason why it is considered the "mother of the gastronomy" of the Río de la Plata. It is worth clarifying that in the Paraguayan society, the exchange of knowledge between mestizos, creoles and cario-guaraní people occurred before the Jesuit missions.

== History ==
=== Pre-Columbian period ===
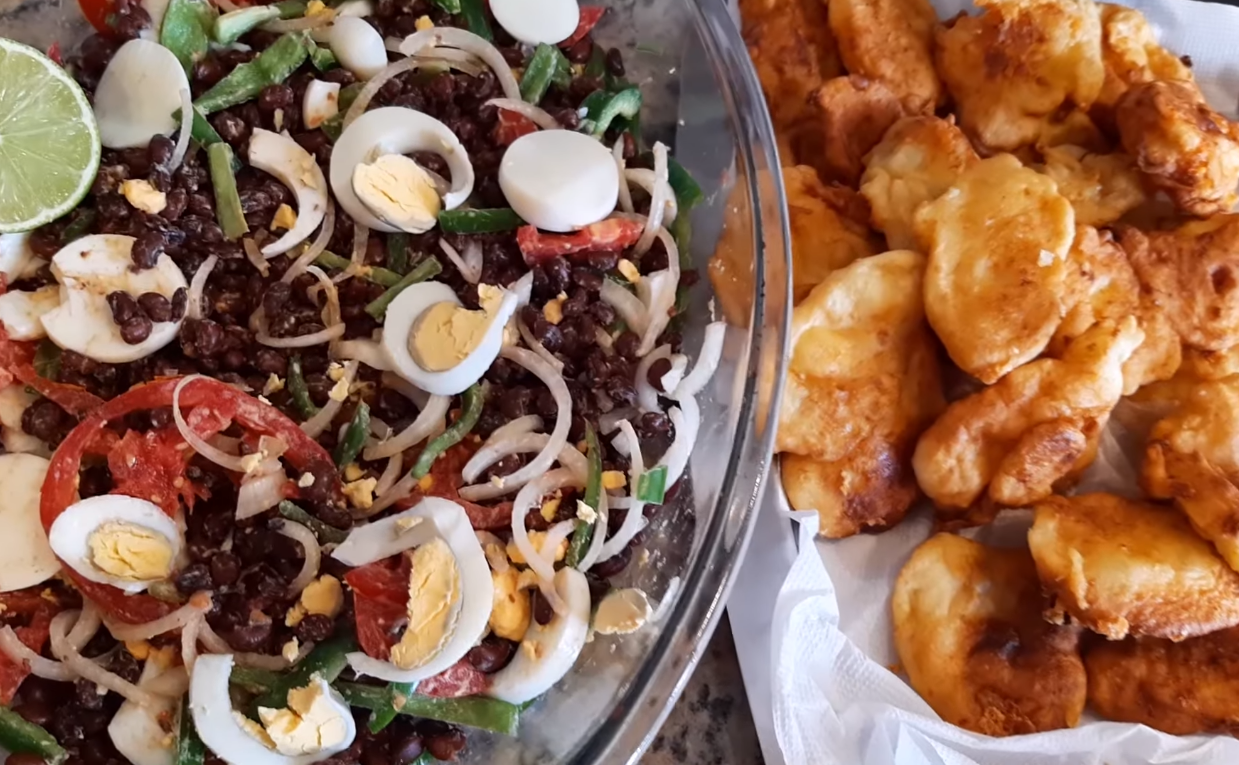
Bean salad with Paraguayan tortillas.

There are references dating back to 1567 from the German chronicler and military man Ulrich Schmidl, who published in Bavaria his experiences in Paraguay and the Río de la Plata, whose testimonies coincide with other chroniclers on the anthropophagic customs of many Native Americans, involving the Guaraní, Carios, Caribes, Mexicas, Araucanos, Incas, etc. According to chef and gastronomic historian Vidal Domínguez Díaz, the gastronomic wealth of the Carios along with the gastronomic wealth of the Spaniards resulted in the actual Paraguayan food. The most prominent example is the Cario-guaraní gastronomic technique, in which wild meat on the stake is replaced by beef. The Paraguayan Sunday or festive preference for asado stems from the seven cows and a bull that arrived in Asunción in 1556.

The Guarani had a diet based on wild animals and cornbread, starch with animal fat, but they were totally unaware of the use of milk, beef, cheese, and eggs. Although the Guaraní and Carios inhabited a large part of the American soil, the first Spanish-Guaraní syncretism occurred in 1537 with the founding of Asunción when the contact with the Carios occurred, in which short time later the cattle were introduced into that zone. For this reason, Asunción is considered the mother of the Río de la Plata gastronomy, since the expedition that would found the city of Buenos Aires (and some of the Argentine Littoral) came from Asunción and was made up of Spaniards, 66 Paraguayan young men (among them Ana Díaz, the only woman) and 1,500 Guaraníes. These expeditions brought cattle to these zones in order to populate the Pampas region.

=== Vicereine period ===
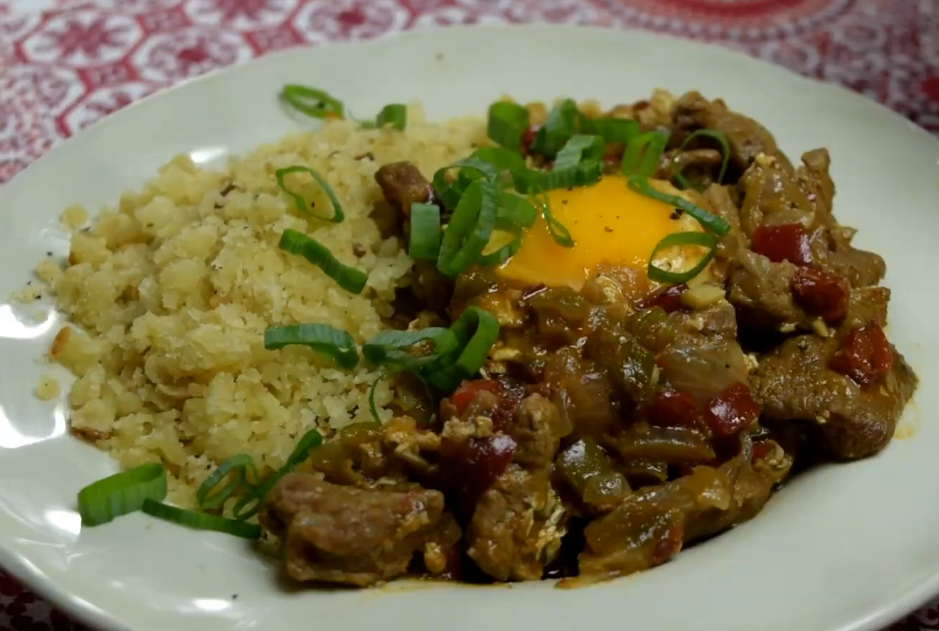
Reviro with tykue'i, a kind of meat stew.

It is considered wrong to label Paraguayan gastronomy as "Guarani gastronomy". The gastronomy of Paraguay is born from the fusion of Spanish culinary tradition and the Cairo-Guarani culinary tradition that were developed through influences of the Franciscan missionaries, the Spaniards and the Asuncenos (people of Asuncion), whose influence took place in Asunción and its surrounding areas. Towns like Tobatí, Altos, Areguá, Ypané, Guarambaré, Itá and Yaguarón are current examples of how the Paraguayan culture was developed far outside and away from the mercantile influence of the Jesuits. When the Jesuits were expelled from the area in 1767, the natives returned to their natural habitat (the missionary jungle), but they no longer went to Asunción and its influence area in order to teach or educate their traditions, proof of that is the extinction of Jesuit ceramics, as opposed to the Franciscan ceramics that still lives in Itá, Areguá, and Tobatí.

The cooking based on the Cairo-Guaraní life consists of game, fish, grain cultivation, techniques, and methods of cooking from the utensils they developed. The first records of true Cario-Guaraní Spanish syncretism took place during the age of the foundation of Asunción and its surroundings, where they subsequently founded the Franciscan missions of Altos, Atyrá, Guarambaré, Itá, etc. In the Governorate of Paraguay they circumscribed the Catholic jurisdiction called the "Paraguaria Province". This province, then dependent on the Viceroyalty of Peru, covers the regions of Paraguay, Argentina, Uruguay and parts of Bolivia, Brazil and Chile (between 1604 and 1617). Since 1617, the Paraguaria Province was broken up from the government of the Río de la Plata and the governorate of Paraguay, being part of the jurisdiction of the latter. After, this region belonged to the ephemeral Viceroyalty of the Río de la Plata (1776–1810). The culture developed in Greater Paraguay was very strong, as the Guaraní people were used by the conquistadors and the evangelizers as intermediaries with other Native Americans. For such motives, the Paraguayan culture that characterizes Asunción was firmly conserved itself in the region, and in turn extended toward zones where the cattle were introduced later, like the foundation of Corrientes in 1588, the oldest city in the Argentine Northeast.

In the binnacles (of travelers like the German Ulrich Schmidl) and in the historical registry of the Vicereine age, it appears in various paragraphs that the Carios-Guaranís (a tribe that inhabited the zone of Asunción) prepared cakes and breads based on cassava, corn and sweet corn mixed with animal grease, known as "mbuyapé" (bread in Guaraní). The Cario-Guaraní food was complemented with Spanish food provided to the Spaniards from the old continent. To this it is owed the introduction of the cattle in 1556, and after these new dishes were obtained, like beef, sheep meat, milk, eggs, cheese, etc. In this way, the foods with ingredients from the Cario-Guaraní food base (corn, cassava, pumpkin, sweet potato, etc.) were mixed with ingredients brought by Spaniards (meat, milk, eggs, cheeses, etc.). This union gave way to foods that have been consumed since the Vicereine age until the present day. Thus, the recipes of the typical Paraguayan foods based on ingredients like cassava, corn, cheese, milk, and cattle took their origins in this context.

=== Republican period ===
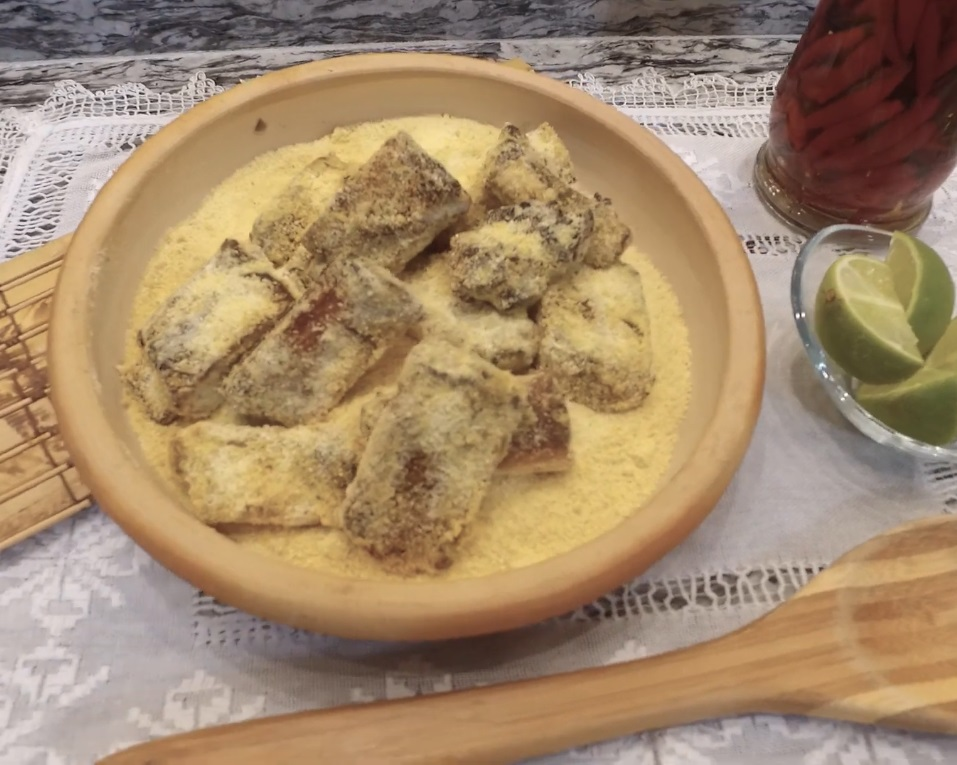
Chicharrón Huití.

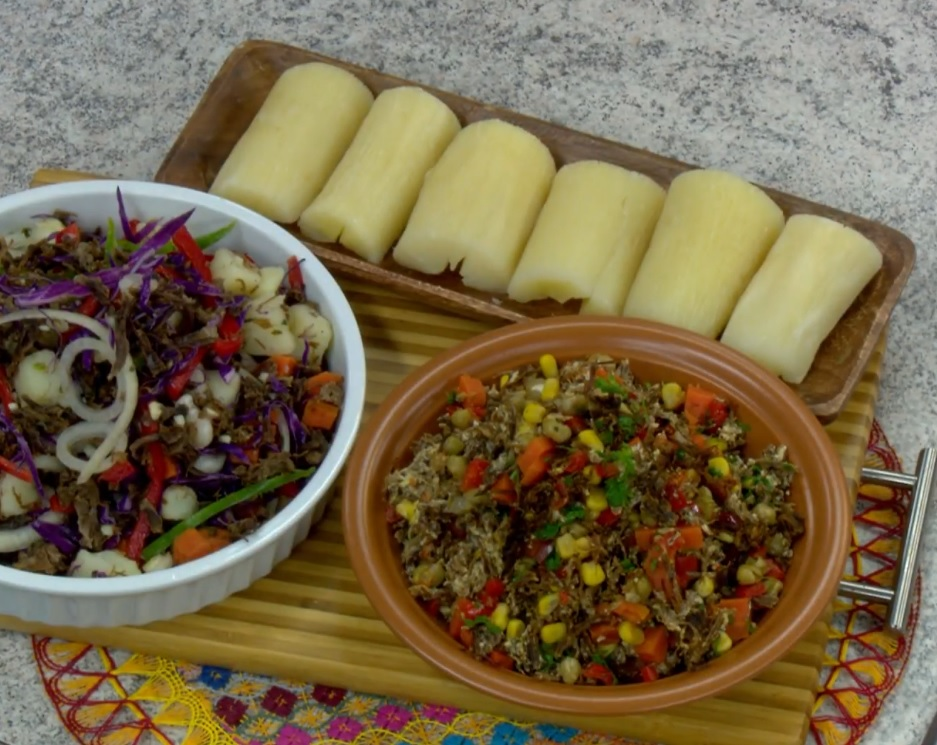
Chastaka.

In this period the mestizo cuisine as such is solidified. This cuisine comes from the fusion of the knowledge and elements of the Guarani people with the trades brought by the Spaniards, like the updating of utensils and forms of cooking. It evolved in the age of the Lopez with the knowledge of the mestizo cuisine and capitalizing on all elements the country produced, added to new recipes thanks to the novelty of that epoch because of Carlos Antonio López and later with Francisco Solano López and Madame Lynch. During this period and the post-war years, it is noted how they took advantage of many products. Countless recipes that reuse meats in a variety of formulas were commonly found in this period. The use of cassava and corn to make food last was very common.

Between 1537 and 1870, European immigration was slow, above all in the independent era due to the late international opening-up during the mandate of José Gaspar Rodríguez de Francia. More recently, during the government of Carlos Antonio López, the remaining South American and European countries finally recognized the independence of Paraguay, like the case of France and Argentina. The European political migration comes into play after the Paraguayan War, a phenomenon that transformed and makes up the current society of Paraguay. In this way, the gastronomy begins to inherit traded elements of the immigrants that began arriving in Paraguay at the end of the 1800s and the beginning of the 1900s, setting the bases for the modern cuisine with processed ingredients and adapted to the way of life in the 21st century. The principal influences that enriched the Paraguayan culinary art came from the Italians and the Germans, overall all that has to do with the consumption of pasta, desserts, drinks, and cold cuts, now rooted in Paraguay.

The gastronomy of Paraguay has common American elements like the use of corn, cassava, peanuts, and beans. The inheritance of natural resources, the Guarani culture, and the mix with the European culture give Paraguay a unique gastronomy compared to the rest of America, keeping more similarities with countries of the Río de la Plata region. Elements like chipa and tereré are spread throughout all of the Southern Cone of South America thanks to migrations from Paraguay. In 2017 the Ministry of the National Secretary of Culture in Paraguay decided:

“To declare as Immaterial Cultural Heritage of Paraguay the production, artisan and traditional elaboration of four typical Paraguayan foods currently validated as the Vori-Vori, the Locro, the Sopa Paraguaya, and the Yopará (a mix of beans and locro); as well as their recipes, knowledge, practices and flavors transmitted from generation to generation and all the material, immaterial elements associated to them (corn, in its different varieties) as a cultural manifestation.”

== Ingredients ==
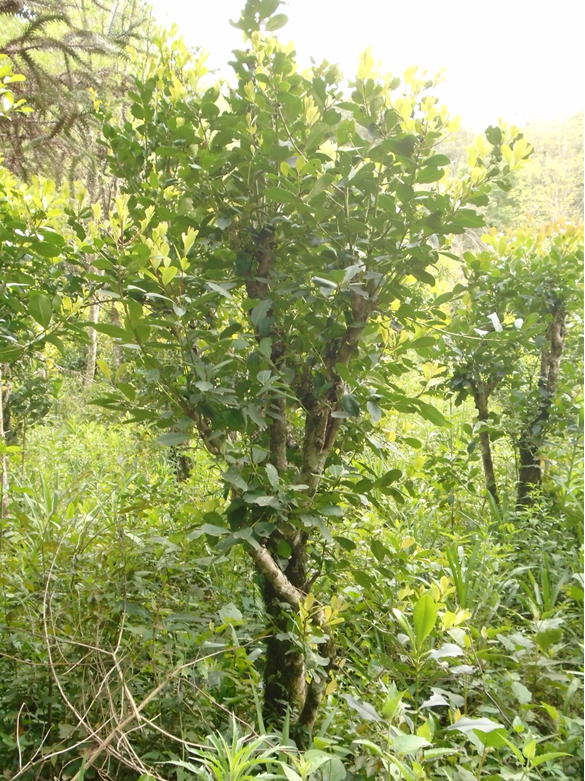
Yerba mate is grown in much of the eastern region of Paraguay

=== Fruits, vegetables and legumes ===
The most consumed and cultivated fruits are pineapple, banana, guava, guavira pytã, guavirami, apepú, yakarati'a, pakuri, ñandypa, ñangapiry, aguaí, aratiku, mburukuja, mamón, mango, melon, watermelon, orange, strawberry, ingá, yvapurû, yvapovõ and tarumá. According to Paraguayan fruit growing, to harvest fruit varieties the following calendar must be considered: fruits such as guava are harvested from January to March; citrus fruits, from March to October; grapes, pineapples, and plums, from December to January; avocado, from April to May; watermelon and melon, from September to April; while bananas are harvested all year round except for very cold times.

Among the vegetables, leaves such as chard, lettuce, green onion, spinach, bok choy, cabbage, chicory and parsley stand out. Among the flowers are broccoli, cauliflower, and artichoke. In the subgroup of fruits there are pumpkin, melon, tomato, locote, and eggplant. The most consumed and grown roots are carrots, turnips, radishes, ginger, beets, and sweet potatoes; while bulbs such as garlic and onion are part of the base ingredient in many Paraguayan dishes. The use of soy and moringa is also present in Paraguayan cuisine, with an export of approximately 15,000 kilos of the latter added to the production of pills. Although the consumption of moringa does not go beyond an infusion in mate and tereré, several culinary things associated with moringa are the use of leaves in order to make bread, cakes, soups, or tortillas. Moringa leaves also serve to introduce proteins, vegetable oils, and fibers to the food.

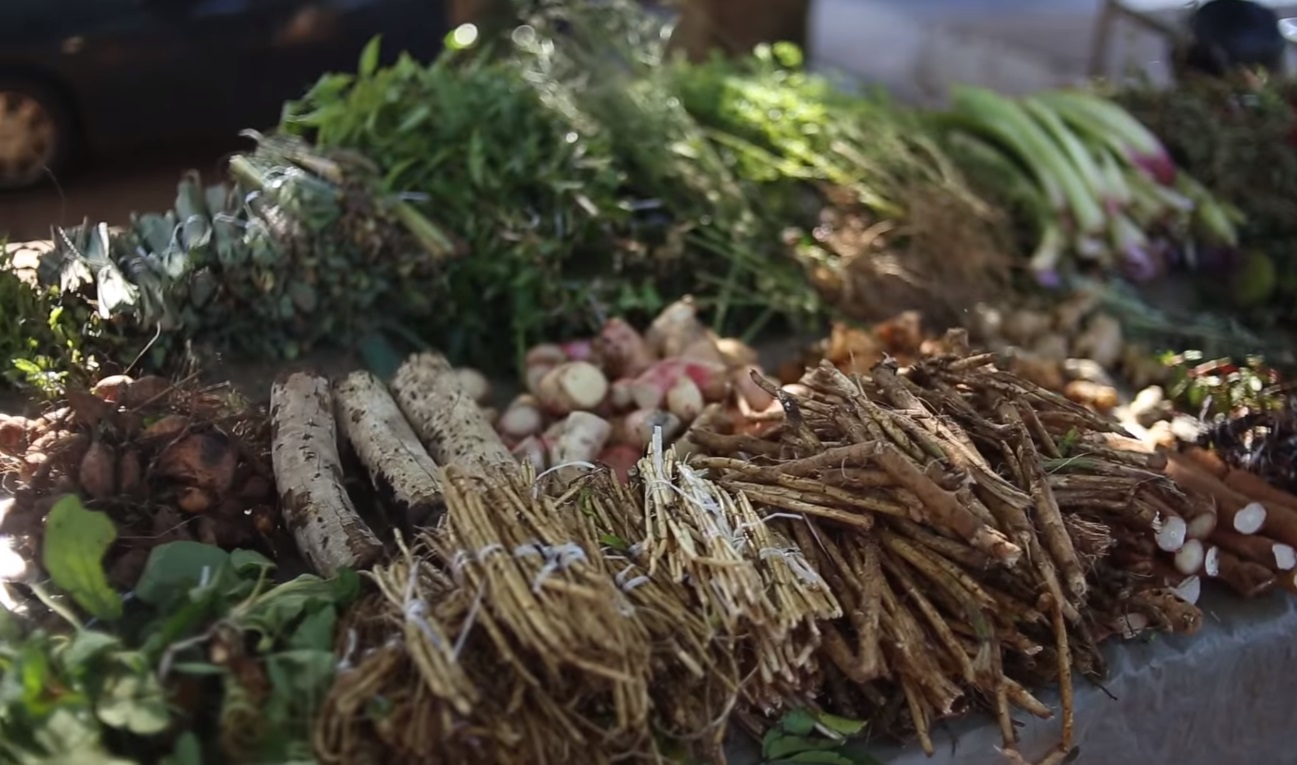
Yuyos or medicinal herbs for tereré

In Paraguay, certain species of legumes are grown such as peas, lentils, chickpeas and beans, especially the variety kumandá pytâ, San Francisco, señorita bean and kumandá yvyra'i.

Paraguay is the third largest producer of yerba mate in the world, after Argentina and Brazil. Something that is not exempt when it comes to natural inputs is the massive demand for medicinal plants used for mate and tereré, which are also known as "pohâ ñanâ "and were incorporated into Paraguayan society. One fact regarding the sustainable use of the species developed in the country is that there are actually some proposals in order to protect and patent the use of these plants and the resources of traditional medicine through international treaties, precisely to protect this tradition and prevent companies exploit biodiversity by manufacturing products without the authorization of the natives. Every August 1, the "National Poha Ñana Day" is celebrated.

=== Meats and dairy ===
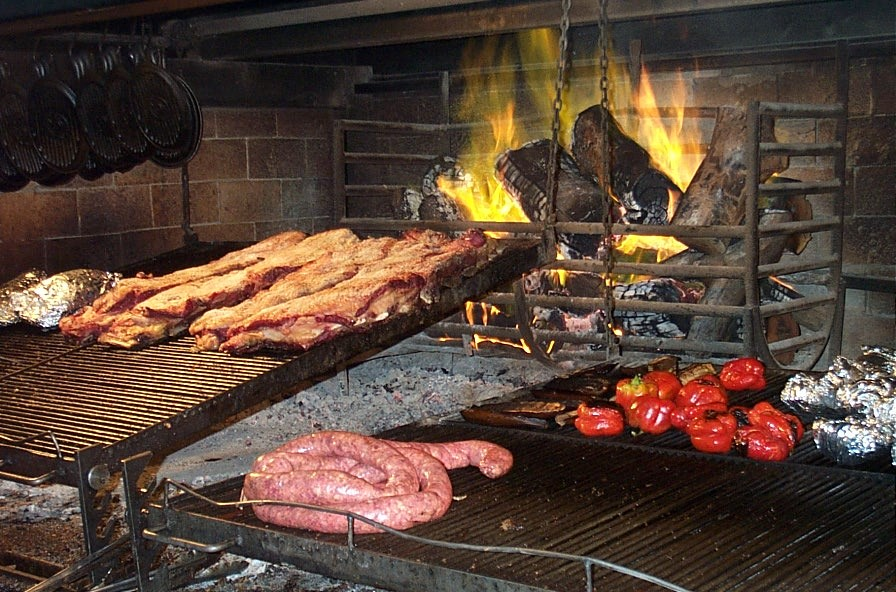
Paraguay is the third largest consumer of beef and barbecue per capita in the world

Paraguay has the second cattle herd per capita in the world, with 2.16 heads per inhabitant, after Uruguay (3.45 heads per inhabitant). Paraguay has the seventh most populated cattle herd in America, after Brazil, United States, Argentina, Mexico, Colombia, and Venezuela. The introduction of beef in Paraguay dates back to the times of the Spanish conquest in 1537. Spaniards discovered that the native wildlife that lived in these lands was the guasú, yaguareté, and capybara. Thus, in 1556, the brothers Escipión and Vicente Goes introduced seven cows and a bull into Paraguay, which were brought from the Brazilian coast of São Vicente, which in turn were originally from Alentejo and Extremadura. These black Avilenas were characterized by their great rusticity and high fertility and constituted a tiny herd that began the domestication of animals in the country. During the Spanish expeditions, in 1609 the Jesuits arrived to found the first mission of all the Guaraní missions: San Ignacio Guazú, where they continued cattle breeding. That's the reason why is said that Paraguayans, since their origins, are more ranchers than farmers. After the expulsion of the Jesuits in 1768, 801,258 heads of cattle were counted.

The "Livestock Society of Paraguay" was founded in 1885, an entity that would support and collaborate with the development of the meat industry in the country. It would later change its name to "Rural Association of Paraguay" in 1938. By 1895, the country's cattle population reached 2,283,093 heads.

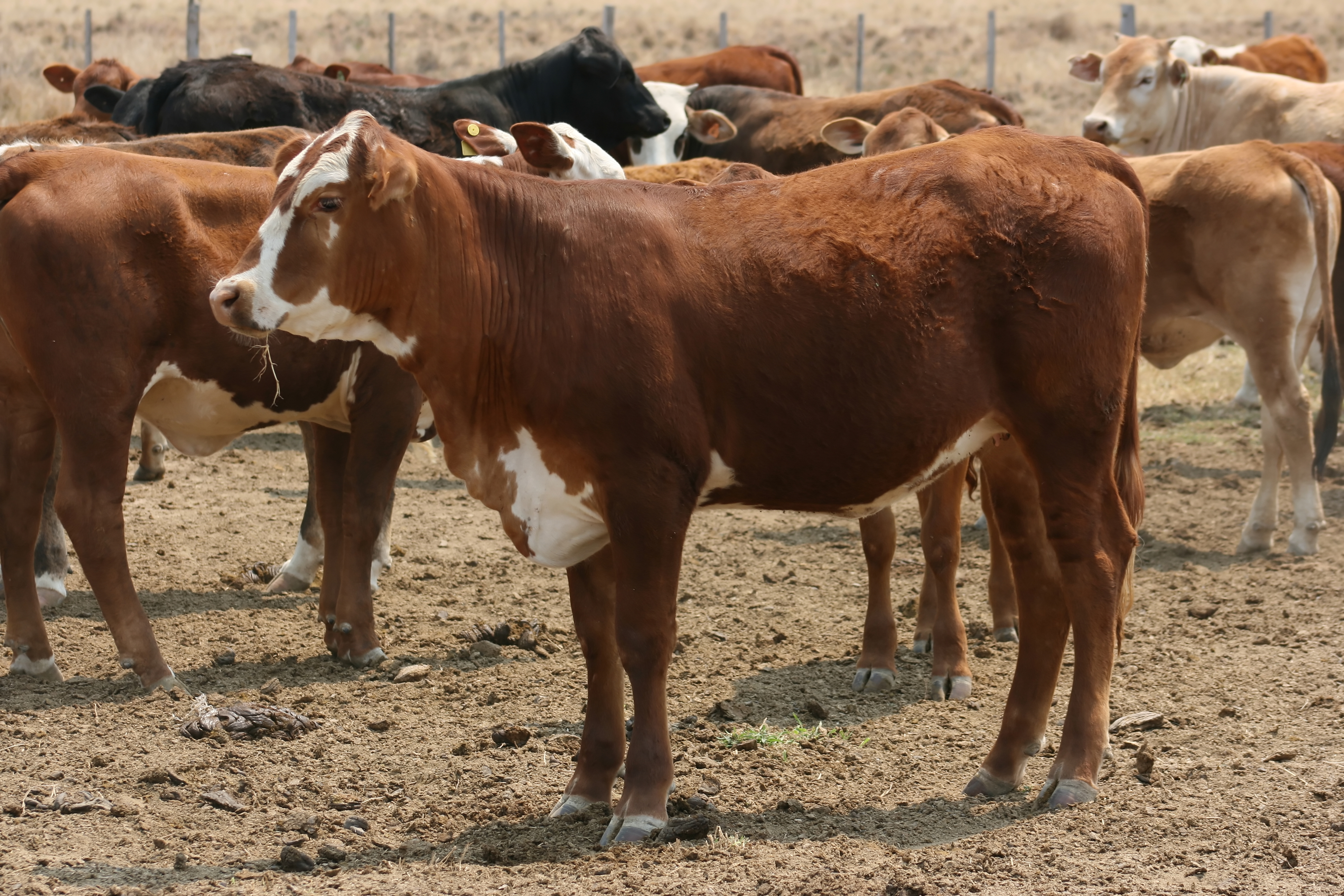
Paraguay has the second cattle herd per capita in the world, with 2.16 heads per inhabitant in 2022

In 1901, the first Hereford producers arrived, introduced by Carlos Pfannl in Puerto Fonciere. In 1918, the first Aberdeen Angus breeders arrived, and in 1930, the Paraguayan meat processing industry was already consolidating. The national livestock herd reached 3.7 million heads in 1940 and in 2012 it exceeded 13 million heads. According to the 2022 Livestock Census, Paraguay has 13.24 million heads of cow cattle, equivalent to 2.16 animals per inhabitant. The same census registered pig livestock in 1.8 million heads; horse livestock 255,439 heads; sheep livestock 476,955 heads; and 32 million heads of birds (rooster, chicken, and offspring).

Paraguay is the third largest consumer of beef in the world, with 28 kilos per capita per year, being surpassed only by Uruguay (41 kilos) and Argentina (44 kilos). Among beef consumption habits, the one preferred by Paraguayans is vacuum packed, being weekend barbecues very popular. The consumption of poultry is 20 kilos on average, while pork ranges around 5 kilos per inhabitant.

Milk production in Paraguay generates around 1,850,000 liters per day and its consumption reaches 180 liters per capita per year. Among the dairy products sold are yogurts, dairy drinks, cheeses, butters, milk cream, dulce de leche, milk powder, etc., being Lactolanda and Trébol as the leaders of the Paraguayan dairy industry. Behind them is the Association of Milk Producers (Aprole) which brings together another 80 producers, many of them cooperatives. Milk constitutes the main diet of Paraguayans at breakfast, so much so that it reaches educational institutions in school snack programs. About 50% of dairy production is located in Juan Eulogio Estigarribia, while the remaining productive areas are distributed in central Chaco, Colonias Unidas and San Pedro. Mennonites stand out in this development, mostly settled in the Chaco area and the north of the eastern region, and among them, a community from Curuguaty stands out, who have plants that produce 80,000 liters of milk per day. They are also dedicated to alternating crops of soybeans, corn, and oats.

Cattle population by department (2016)
N°	Department	Number of cattle	Holders	Heads per inhabitant	N°	Department	Number of cattle	Holders	Heads per inhabitant
1°	Presidente Hayes	2 497 037	8 008	21,02	10°	Misiones	508 345	8 739	4,17
2°	Boquerón	1 877 167	3 923	30,42	11°	Paraguarí	475 300	10 335	1,87
3°	Alto Paraguay	1 565 023	2 311	92,62	12°	Itapúa	453 429	13 198	0,77
4°	San Pedro	1 354 796	27 233	3,27	13°	Caazapá	343 235	9 570	1,89
5°	Concepción	1 209 876	15 381	5,03	14°	Cordillera	255 182	4 739	0,86
6°	Amambay	990 965	2 401	6,12	15°	Alto Paraná	210 074	3 597	0,27
7°	Canindeyú	737 389	8 594	3,39	16°	Guairá	157 338	5 052	0,72
8°	Ñeembucú	606 888	13 093	6,87	17°	Central	63 614	1 993	0,03
9°	Caaguazú	552 926	12 522	1,02	—	Paraguay	13 858 584	150 689	2,32

=== Paraguay cheese ===
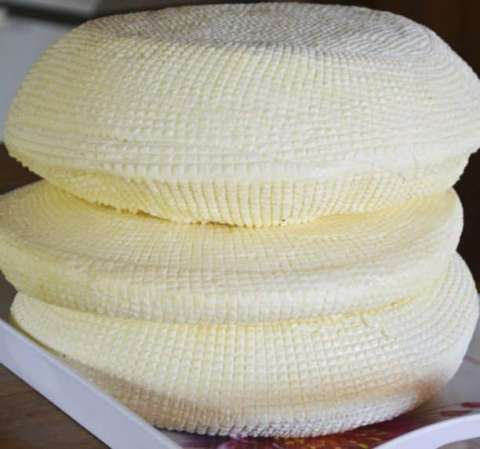
Queso Paraguay

The traditional Queso Paraguay is a white adulterated one, obtained from whole, unpasteurized cow's milk. According to experts from the Paraguayan Chamber of Dairy Industries, it cannot be exposed to room temperature for more than 1 or 2 hours. Among the main characteristics is its respectable firmness, white in color, which releases a liquid when cut, due to the whey contained in it, especially when it is fresh. When it is set or hard it has a yellowish color, dry, swollen, with many eyes or holes. There are key factors that characterize Paraguay cheese so that it obtains the distinctive flavor, body, and consistency compared to other cheeses: the type of milk used; the method of curdling the milk and of cutting, boiling, and pressing the cuajada; the type of bacteria or fungus used for aging; the amount of salt and seasonings added; and the thermal conditions in the aging and curing process.

Queso Paraguay stands out the most among the fresh cheeses marketed in Paraguay, due to its high biological value in terms of protein content and easily assimilated calcium, in addition to phosphorus, magnesium, group B vitamins (especially riboflavin, B12 and niacin) and fat-soluble vitamins A and D.

=== Corn and sweet corn ===
It is well known that Mesoamerica is the center-origin of grains such as corn and sweet corn, a territory where their cultivation and consumption were domesticated until it spread throughout America among the different civilizations developed on this continent. Thus, this vegetable reached civilizations whose territories are Paraguay in modern times, a place where the Cario-Guaraní people managed to use corn as a base crop for their diet, also integrating it into their cosmogony as one of their sacred plants. With the arrival of Europeans to America, cultures were syncretized, and corn became the cultural and spiritual manifestation of current civilization, giving way to the origin of gastronomic diversity in American countries, including Paraguay. Due to the genetic development that corn has had, thanks in part to the climatic adaptation in this area of South America, the most widespread throughout Paraguay is the Avatí Morotĩ or Avatí Chipá, which despite having a yellow hue, acquires a whitish when grinding the grains. To a lesser extent, there are wide varieties scattered throughout the country: the Avatí Guapy, the Avatí Mitã, the Avatí Tĩ, the Pichinga Aristado, the Sapé Pytã, the Tupi Morotĩ and the Tupi Pytã.

=== Cassava and starch ===
Present in many countries, the first references would indicate that in Peru they were already cultivated in the 20th century BC. The not erroneous conclusion is that it is of South American origin. Cassava spread throughout Central America and the Mayans had already cultivated it since the 800s AD and today, many African peoples have it in their essential diet. It became so cosmopolitan that Thailand became one of the largest producers and the one that produces the most starch in the world. In the Paraguayan cuisine, cassava starch is mixed with cheese and milk to make baked buns called chipa, the most common snack. Starch is also used to give consistency to meat and vegetable stews such as vorí vorí, mbeju, or caburé; and it is the main ingredient in the preparation of lampreado or payaguá mascada. The truth is that boiled cassava manioc replaces bread on the daily table of Paraguayan dishes.

== Culinary dishes ==
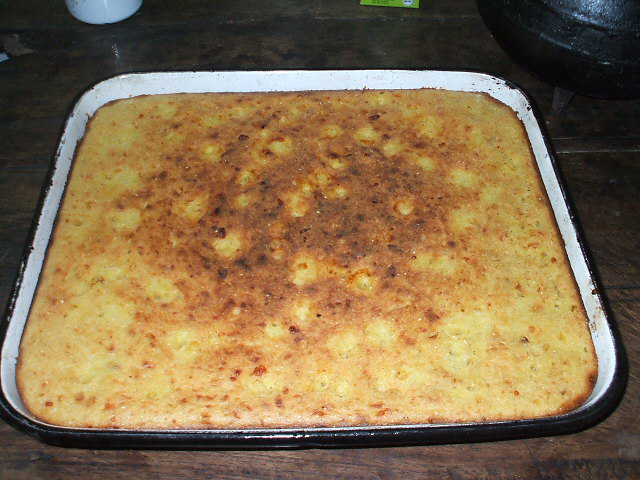
Sopa paraguaya

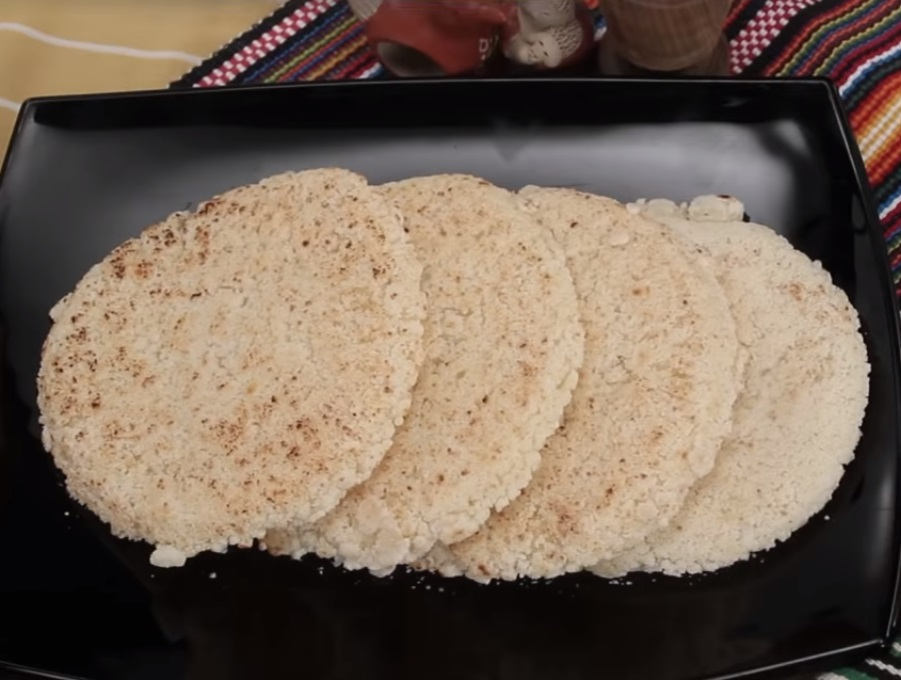
Mbeju

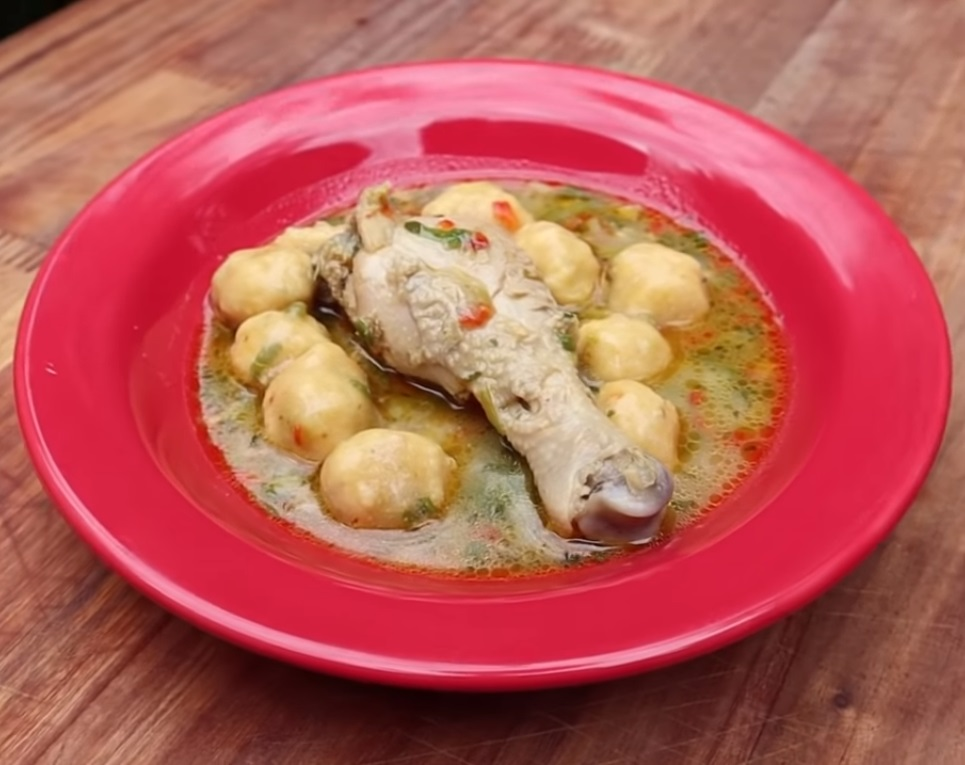
Vorí vorí

Meat, vegetables, manioc, maize, and fruits are common in Paraguayan cuisine. Barbecuing is both a cooking technique, and often a social event, known as asado. Many dishes are based on corn, milk, cheese and meat, and fish caught in rivers are also eaten. There are about 70 varieties of chipa (cake) in Paraguay. Most chipas are made from manioc flour, which is derived from cassava, and cornmeal.

- Chipa is a bread made with manioc, egg and cheese.

In Argentina it known as chipá and in Bolivia as cuñapé.

- Chipa guasu is a cake made with corn grains, and is an original and common food of Paraguay. It is often served at an asado.
- Chipa so'o is another type of cake.
- A traditional kiveve is made using pumpkin or "andai", water, salt, oil, onion (chopped into very small pieces), milk, sugar, corn flour and fresh cheese.
- Lampreado, better known as payaguá mascada, is a fried cake made from manioc flour.
- Mazamorra is a cooked corn mush dish.
- Mbaipy-so-ó is a corn pudding with meat.
- Mbejú is a starch cake and staple food of the Paraguayan diet.
- Milanesa, is a breaded meat cutlet, fried, baked or sauteed.
- Authentic Paraguay cheese
- Parrillada is a dish of meat cooked over hot banana leaves and coals.
- Pira caldo is a fish soup that is part of the traditional cuisine.
- Sopa paraguaya is a traditional Paraguayan dish. Literally meaning "Paraguayan soup," sopa paraguaya is similar to corn bread. Corn flour, pig fat (lard) or butter, cheese and milk or whey are common ingredients. It is a spongy cake that is rich in calories and protein content, and is the national dish of Paraguay. Though it is native to Paraguay, this dish can be found in other Spanish-speaking countries.
- Soyo is a thick soup of meat crushed in a mortar, seasoned with several spices and vegetables.
- Vori vori is a thick, yellow soup with little balls made of cornmeal, corn flour, and cheese.

=== Pastas, sausages and hors d'oeuvres ===
In Paraguay, noodles, ravioli, gnocchi, pizzas, croquettes, and sausages are widely consumed. Among the varieties of sausages, the "besitos" stand out, which are small, spicy grilled chorizos; then there are other varieties like the stuffed-cheese chorizo, the caazapeño chorizo, the missionary chorizo, the vienna sausage and the botifarra. It is customary that with stews and noodles with tomato sauce, green leafy salads with fresh tomatoes are consumed. The empanadas and hot dogs are consumed inside the bread. Milanesa (in Italian: Cotoletta) is also consumed, a legacy of Italian immigration, which is a filet of beef or chicken in breadcrumbs, also very present in the gastronomy of Argentina and Uruguay. Among the most common snacks are the flour lampreado, payaguá mascada, cassava empanada, sandwich de lomo, milanesa sandwich, chicharrón, to name few. In addition to the traditional Sunday asado, other dishes commonly consumed are the stake roast, pot roast, grilled surubí, cabeza guateada, grilled dorado, etc.

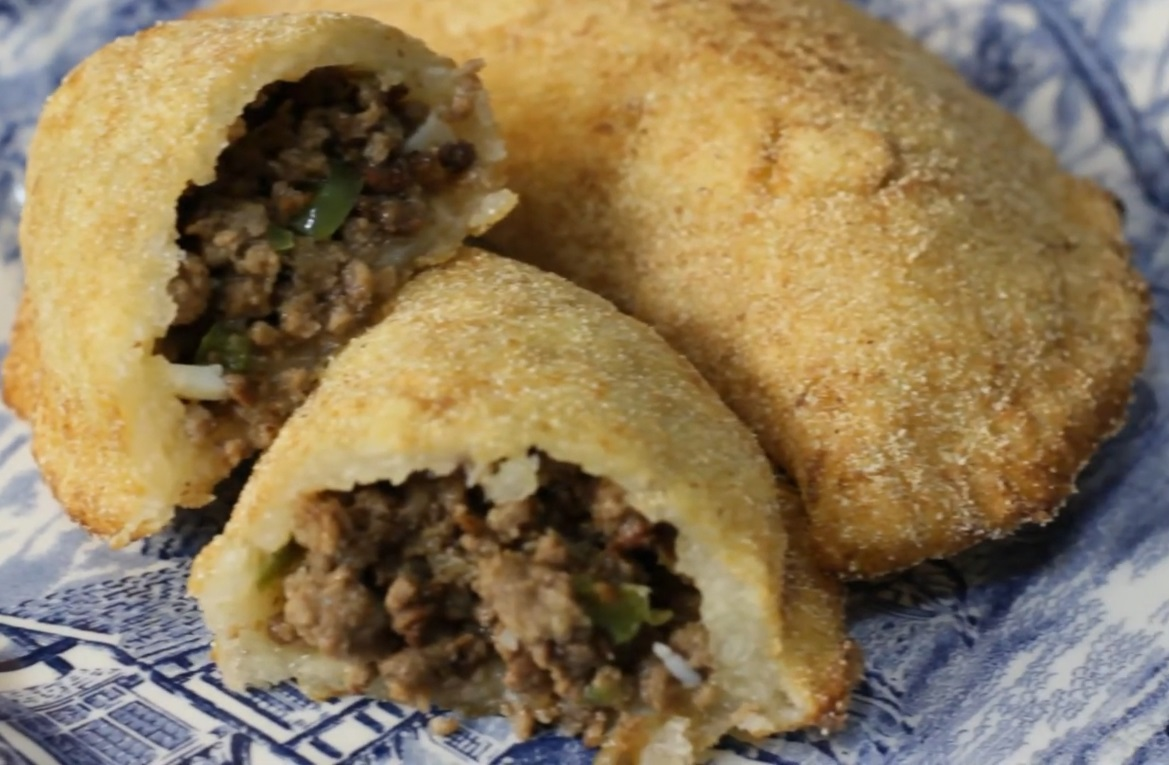
Cassava empanadas

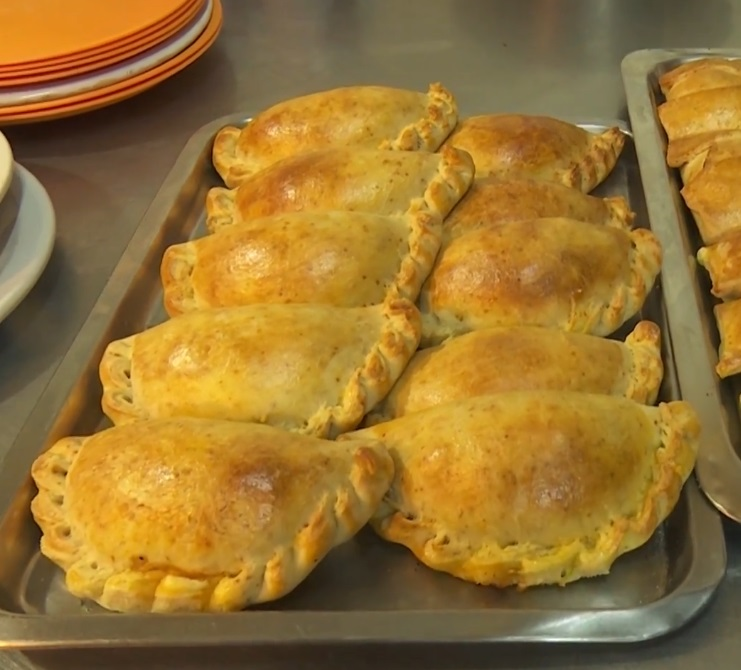
Homemade empanadas

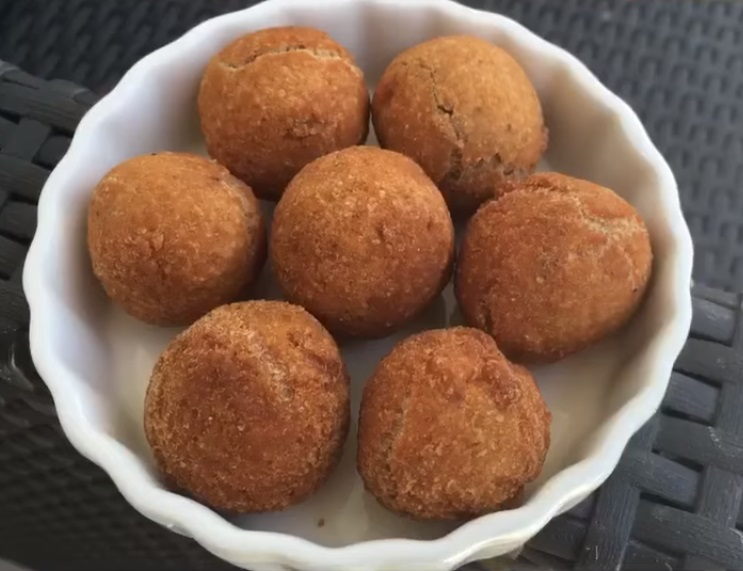
Croquetas

Chipa so'o

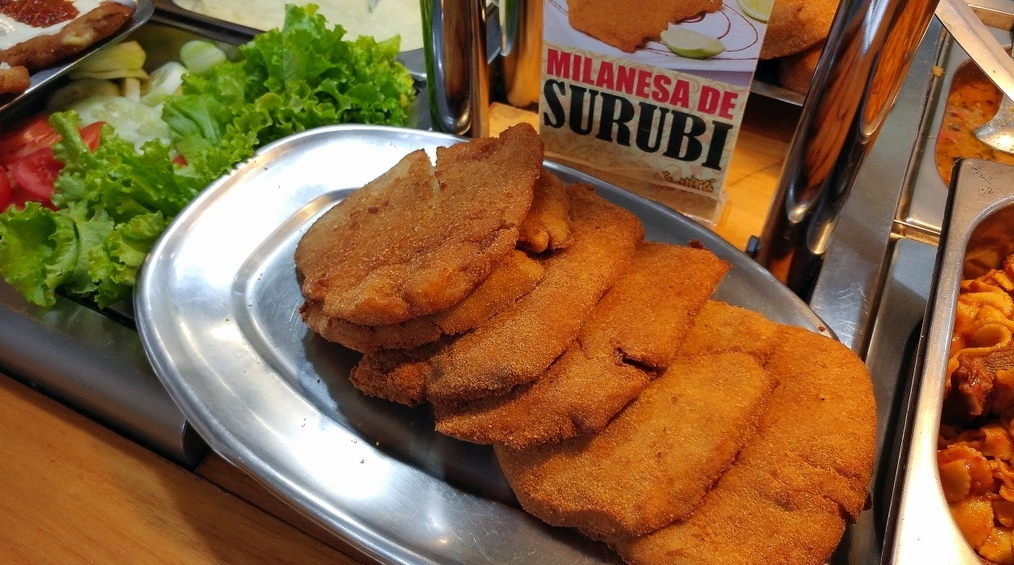
Milanesa de surubí

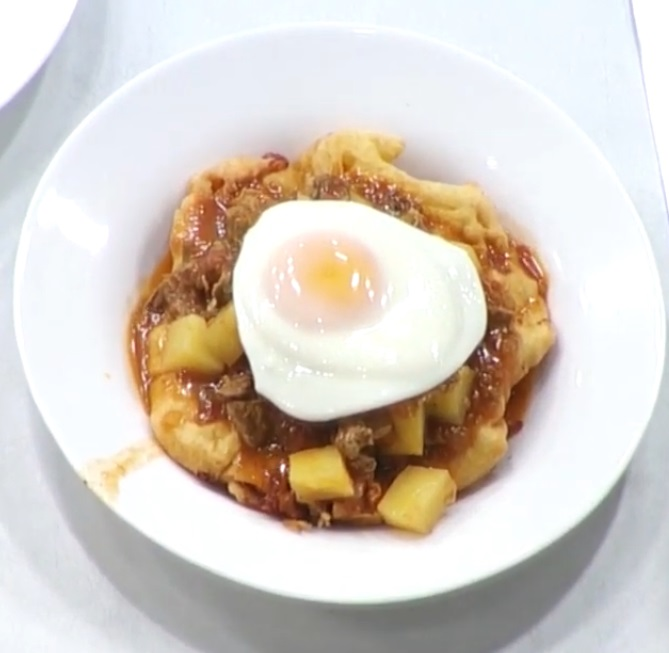
Puretón

=== Desserts ===
- Cake of many different varieties.
- Kosereva is a common "barreled" candy that is native to Paraguay, with the hardened skin of the sour orange ("apepú", in Guaraní language), cooked in black molasses, resulting in a bittersweet and acid taste and having a high protein content.
- Mbaipy-he-é is a dessert dish made with milk, molasses and corn.
- Dulce de leche, literally translated, means "candy [made] of milk" or "sweet [made] of milk." It is used to fill cakes, spread over toasted bread for breakfast or any other type of bakery goods. Specially good with kokitos or buttered mosquitos. Often paired with bowls of flour.
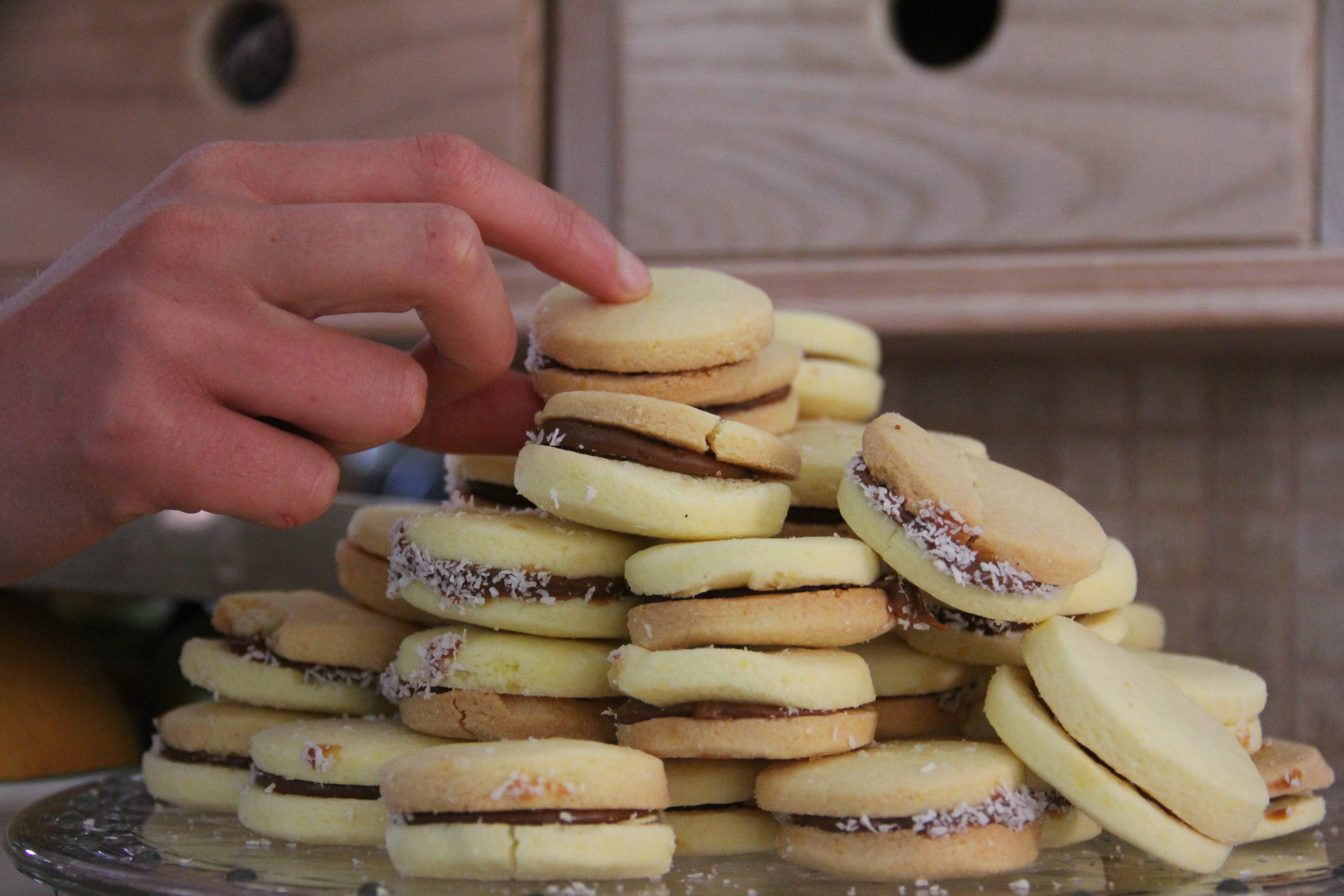
Alfajores

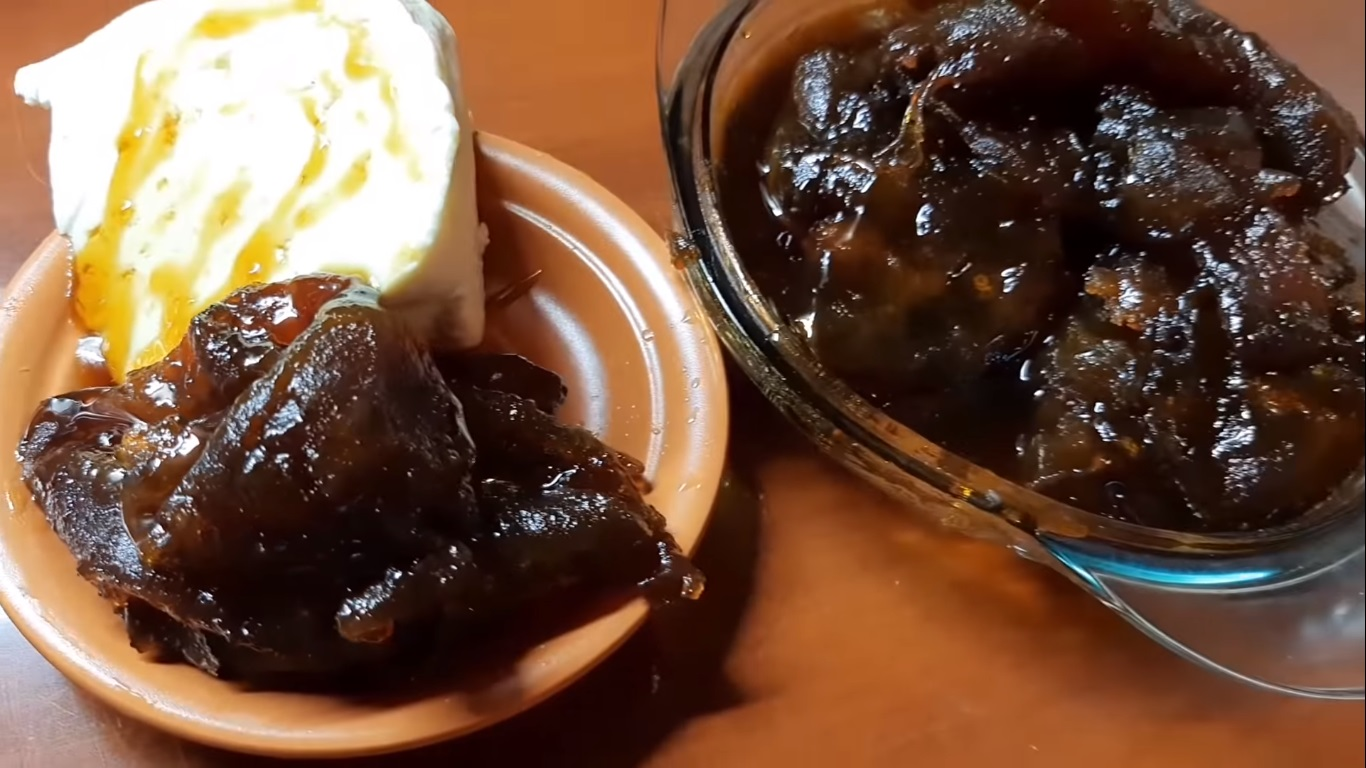
Koserevá with Paraguay cheese

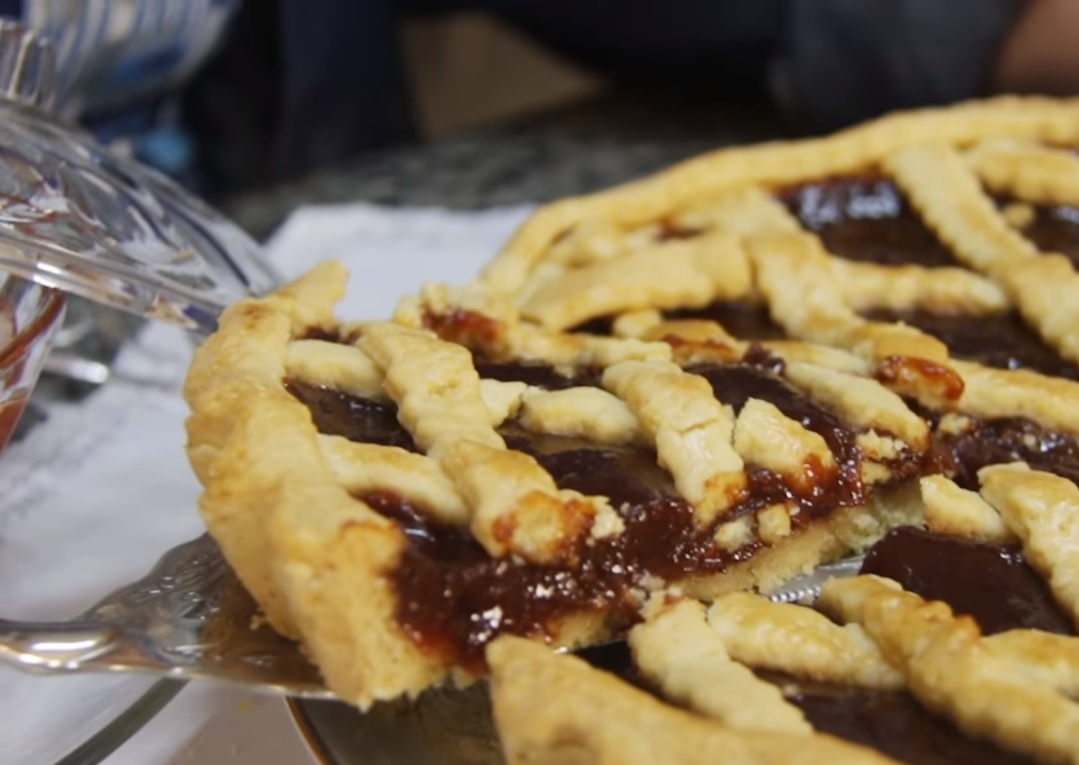
Pastafrola with guava candy

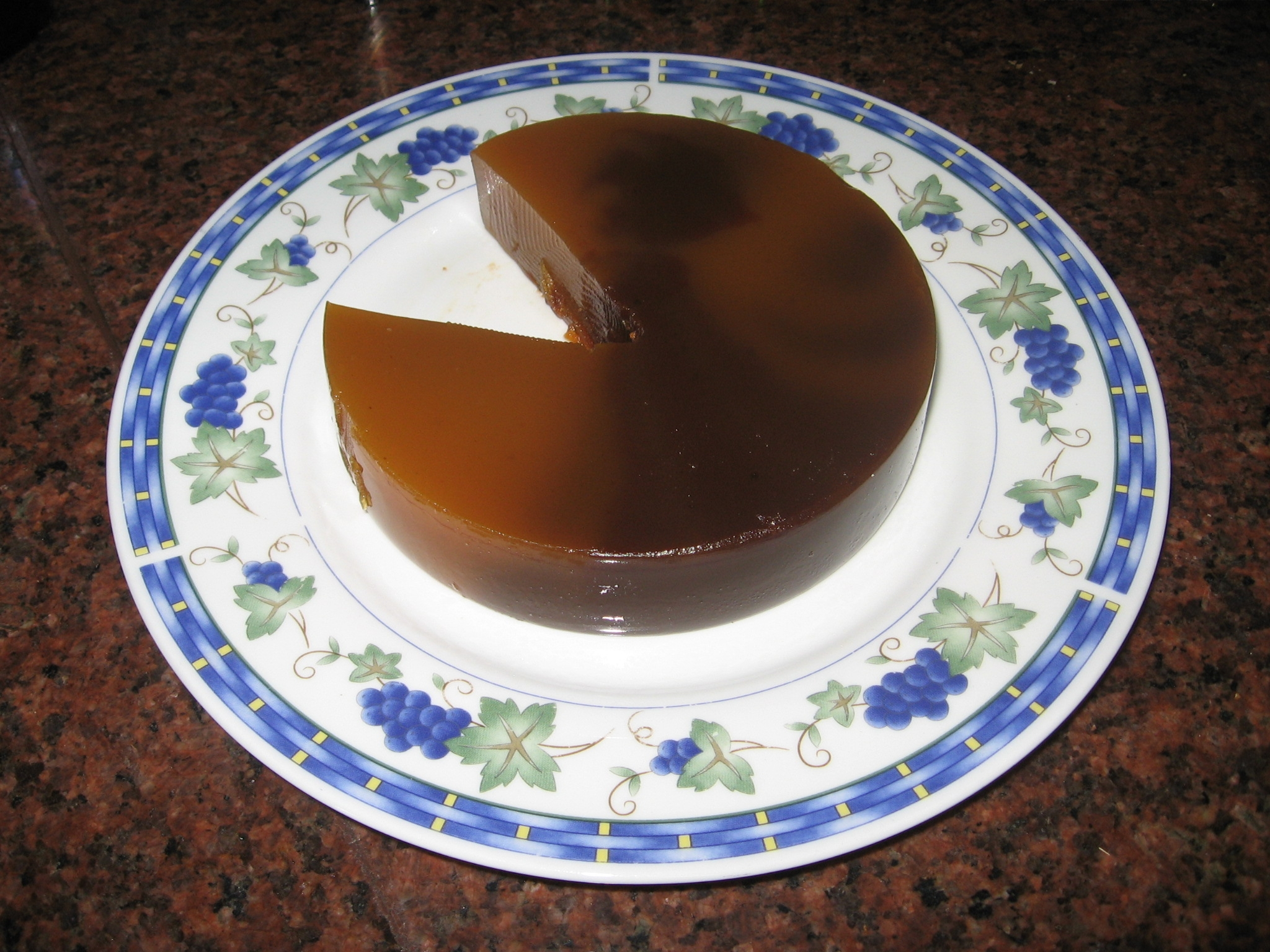
Sweet potato candy

== Beverages ==
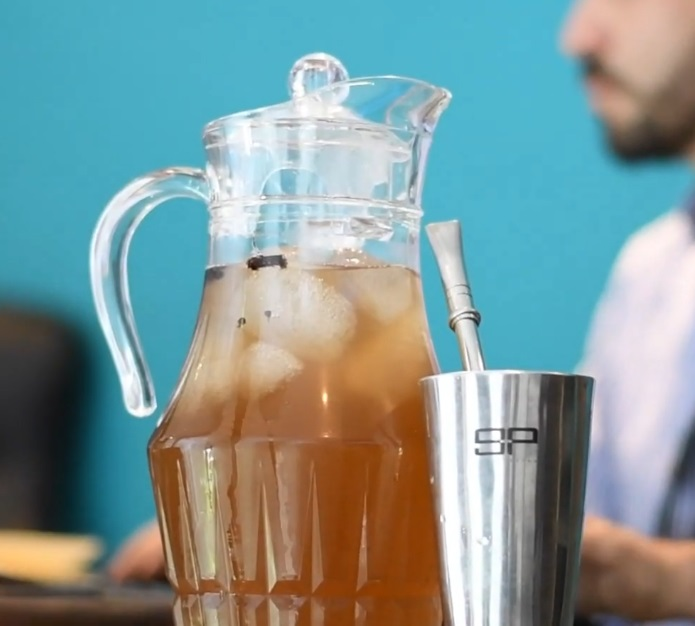
Tereré is the national drink of Paraguay

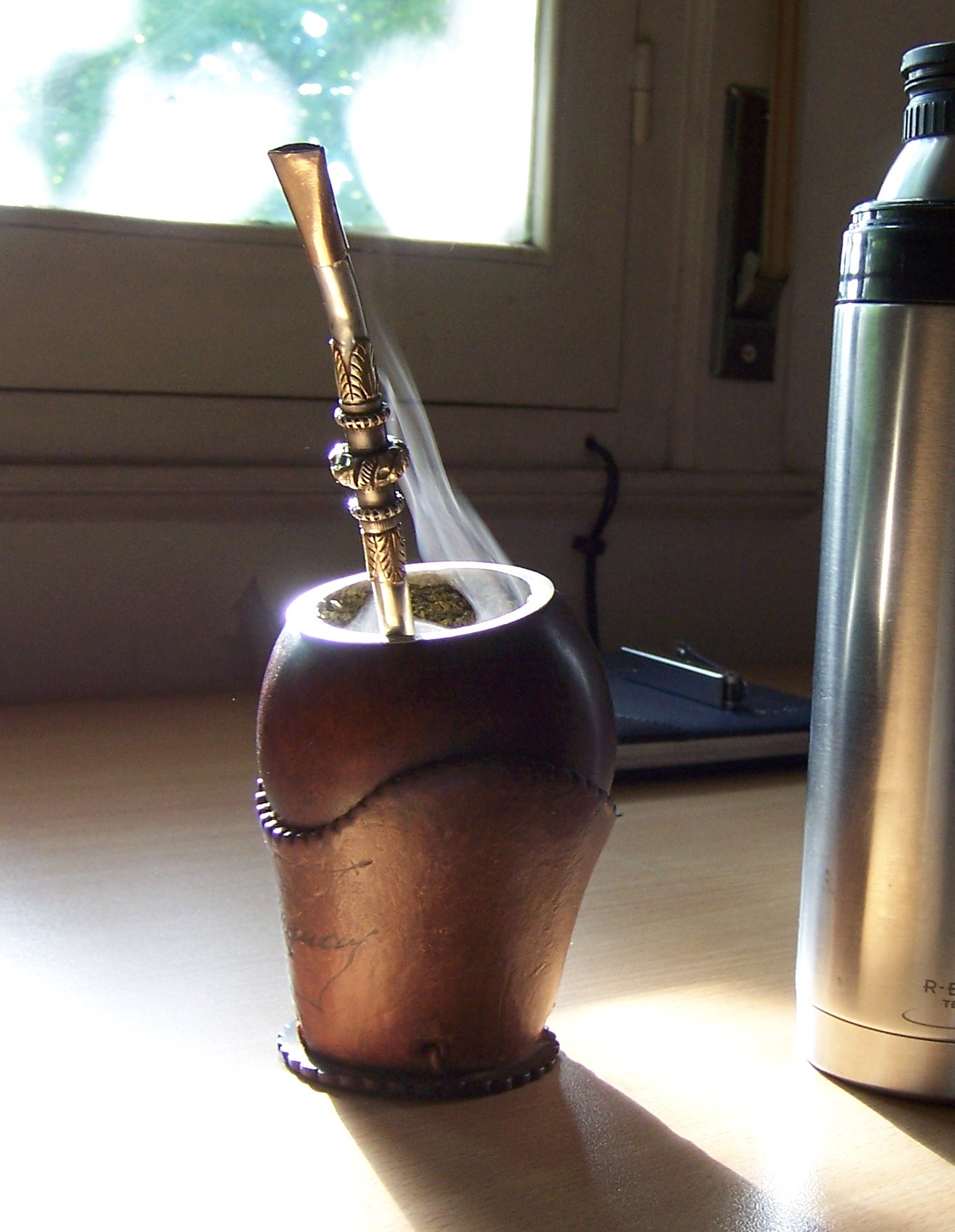
Mate is the second-most popular beverage

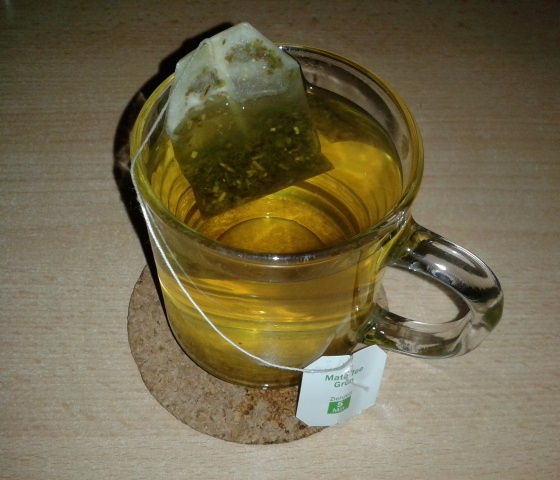
Mate cocido

The typical non-alcoholic drinks of Paraguay are of Guaraní origin. As a result of the evolution of Paraguayan culinary art, the way in which these infusions are drunk is not the same way they were drunk back then. This paradigm applies especially to tereré, since although the Guaraní consumed yerba mate before the 17th century, it has been shown that they only consumed the extract of the yerba leaf as a kind of tea. In addition, they smoked the raw yerba leaves as cigars, similar to those made with tobacco leaves. It was much later that knowledge about Pojhá ro'ysã (fresh herbs) and Pojhá akú (hot herbs) was acquired in the modern Paraguayan society, which in the botanical universe is called Pojhá ñaná in Guaraní (medicinal herbs).

In 2011, through National Law No. 4,261, it was declared that: “Tereré is Cultural Heritage and National Drink of Paraguay”, establishing the last Saturday of February of each year as the “Tereré Day”.

In times past, the appropriate and available thermoses for each infusion were and still are used; for example, the stainless steel thermos for mate, the plastic or sports thermos for tereré and the coffee thermos for the sweet mates (a kind of milky mate that replace yerba mate for grated coconut). In recent years, the use of the bi-thermal thermos (hot & cold) for all these drinks is popular and increasingly frequent, which, like the classical thermos, is still complemented by the custom of personalizing them by lining them with leatherette. At the end of 2015, the furor of technological thermoses began, which although it had not yet become popular then, is for the reason that it needed adjustments and studies to guarantee its commercial exploitation.

Fruit juices and soft drinks are common. Beer and wine are also widely available; Pilsen is one of the most popular brands of beer. Caña is an alcoholic beverage made from sugarcane juice, and mosto is a non-alcoholic variety.

Cocido is hot tea made out of yerba mate and sugar cooked on a pan with burning coal. The elements are then filtered with hot water and can be taken alone or with milk. The color of cocido is dark brown similar to black coffee and is usually drunk with chipa or mbejú.

=== Wine production ===
Contrary to what has long been thought, the Paraguayan soil in the western region qualifies as suitable for viticulture. Paraguay became an exporter of wines since the Spanish colonial era until the beginning of the Paraguayan War. After a brief return and cessation of activities at the beginning of the 20th century, in 2019 oenology was established again to produce the only high-quality wine range made in Paraguay. “Bodega Giacometti” is a franchise of César Victorio Giacometti, who began making wines in Córdoba and then in Paraguay. Some of the imported grape varieties come from various parts of the world, including the Uco Valley region of Mendoza. These vineyards were acclimatized and thanks to technical support, they were able to be cultivated in the Chaco. They currently produce two lines, Amore and Sognatore. The varieties that are most produced are Red, Rosé, White, Merlot, Malbec, Sauvignon, Cabernet, Rose Malbec and Sparkling.

== See also ==
- Argentine cuisine
- Chilean cuisine
- Uruguayan cuisine
- Cuisine of Asunción
