= Wheel stops =

Wheel stops may refer to:

- Wheel chocks, for aircraft or road vehicles
- Railway wheel stops
