= Pilsen =

Pilsen may refer to:

== Places ==
- Plzeň, Czech Republic, known in German and English as Pilsen
  - Plzeň Plaza, shopping mall and entertainment center in Plzeň
- Pilzno, a town in Poland known in English as Pilsen
- Pilsen Historic District in Chicago, Illinois
- Pilsen, Kansas, U.S.
- Pilsen, Wisconsin, U.S.
- Pilsen (community), Wisconsin, U.S.

== Sport ==
- FC Viktoria Plzeň, an association football club
- HC Plzeň, an ice hockey club

== Other uses ==
- Cerveza Pilsen (Paraguay), a pilsner beer brand from Paraguay
- Pilsen (band), a punk band from Argentina

== See also ==
- Pilsner, type of beer
- Pilzno or Pilsen, Poland
- Nagybörzsöny or Deutsch Pilsen, Hungary
