= Chock =

Chock or Chocks may refer to:

== Devices for preventing movement ==
- Wheel chock, tool to prevent accidental movement
- Chock (climbing), anchor
- Chock, component of a sailing block

== Other uses ==
- Chock (surname)
- Chock (TV series), a Swedish horror television series
- Chock, a Swedish-language edition of Chill
- Chocks, a children's multivitamin product made by Miles Laboratories

== See also ==
- Choc (disambiguation)
- Chok (disambiguation)
- "Chocky", short story
- Chock full o'Nuts, coffee brand
- Railway wheel stop
