= Wheel stop =

Wheel stop may refer to:

- Wheel chock, for aircraft or road vehicles
- Railway wheel stop
