= Chock (surname) =

Chock is a surname. Notable people with the surname include:

- Eric Chock, Hawaiian poet, scholar and editor
- Madison Chock (born 1992), American dancer
- Naomi Takemoto-Chock (fl. 1980s), American psychologist
- Travis Chock (Born 1982), Founder of Baseballism

== See also ==
- Chock (disambiguation)
