= Quibebé =

Semi-sweet winter squash stew

Quibebe
- Type: Purée
- Place of origin: Paraguay
- Main ingredients: winter squash

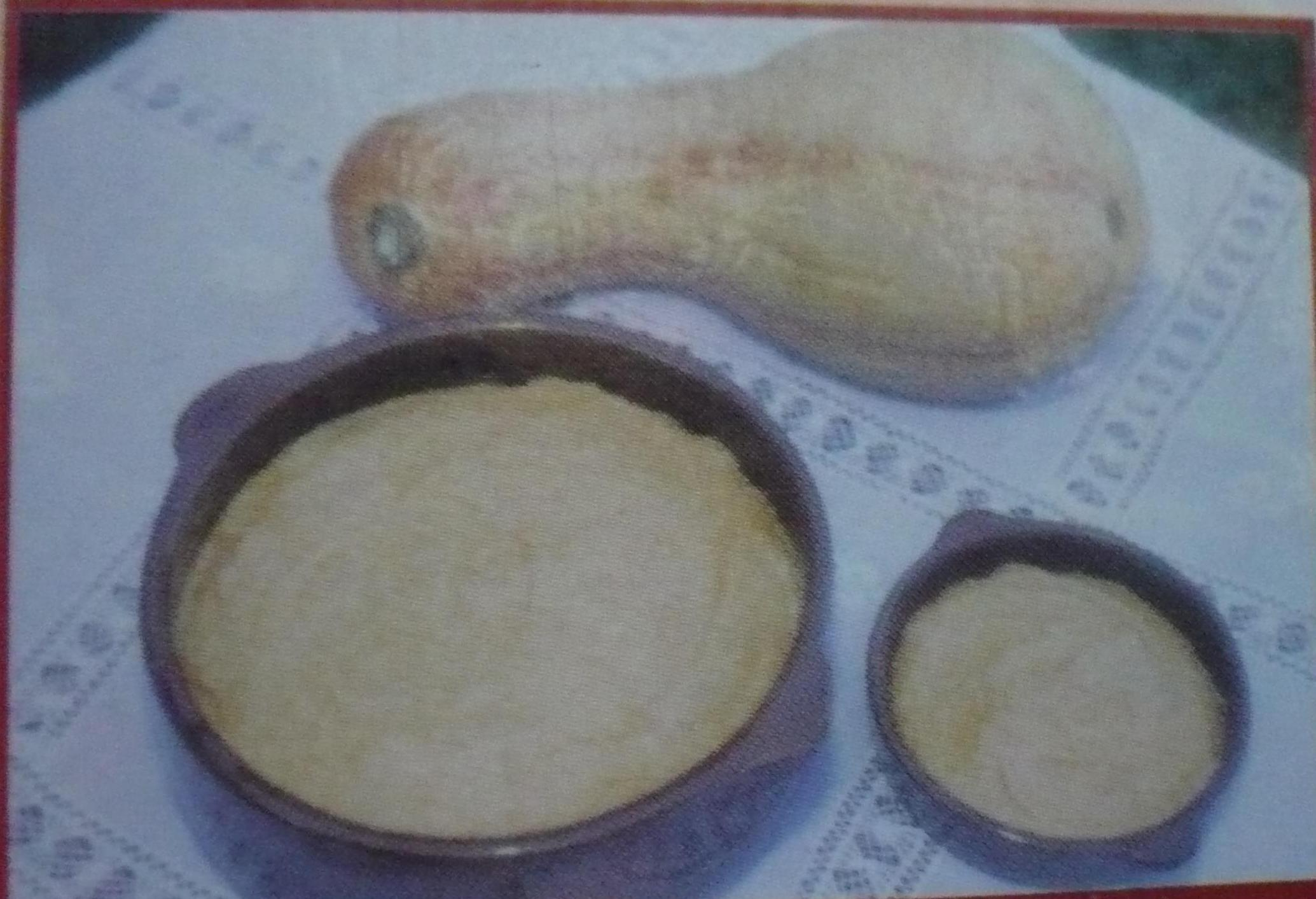
Kiveve is a creamy traditional dish of Paraguay and the North-East of Argentina that is made with a pumpkin with deep orange flesh and sweet taste, milk, sugar, corn flour, and fresh cheese, and may be served as a dessert, as a breakfast, or as a sweet snack during the afternoon.

Quibebé ([kiβeˈβe], Argentina, Bolivia, Paraguay, and Uruguay), kiveve (Paraguay, pronounced the same), or quibebe ([ki'bɛbi], Brazil) is a popular dish of semi-sweet winter squash stew or purée in Paraguayan, Northeastern Brazilian, and the North-Eastern Argentina gastronomies. (Note: "Quibebe . Stewed squash stew is called quibebe in Brazil, Argentina, Paraguay, Bolivia and Uruguay.) It has a doughy texture and is of creamy consistency. Its taste is very pleasant and the primary ingredient is a pumpkin fruit that is called by the guarani name, "andaí" or "zapallo anco" of Cucurbita moschata. The fruit is a squash that may be elongated or spherical, and its exterior color ranges from green to orange, to reddish. The pulp is orange color (a color that in Guarany would be called "reddish", the translation of the term Kiveve), compact, of firm texture, and has a sweet flavor.

Till the second part of the 19th century, it was very usual in the city of Buenos Aires and its area of influence.

The origin of "kiveve" is located in Guaraní-Jesuit Missions.

== Ingredients and preparation ==
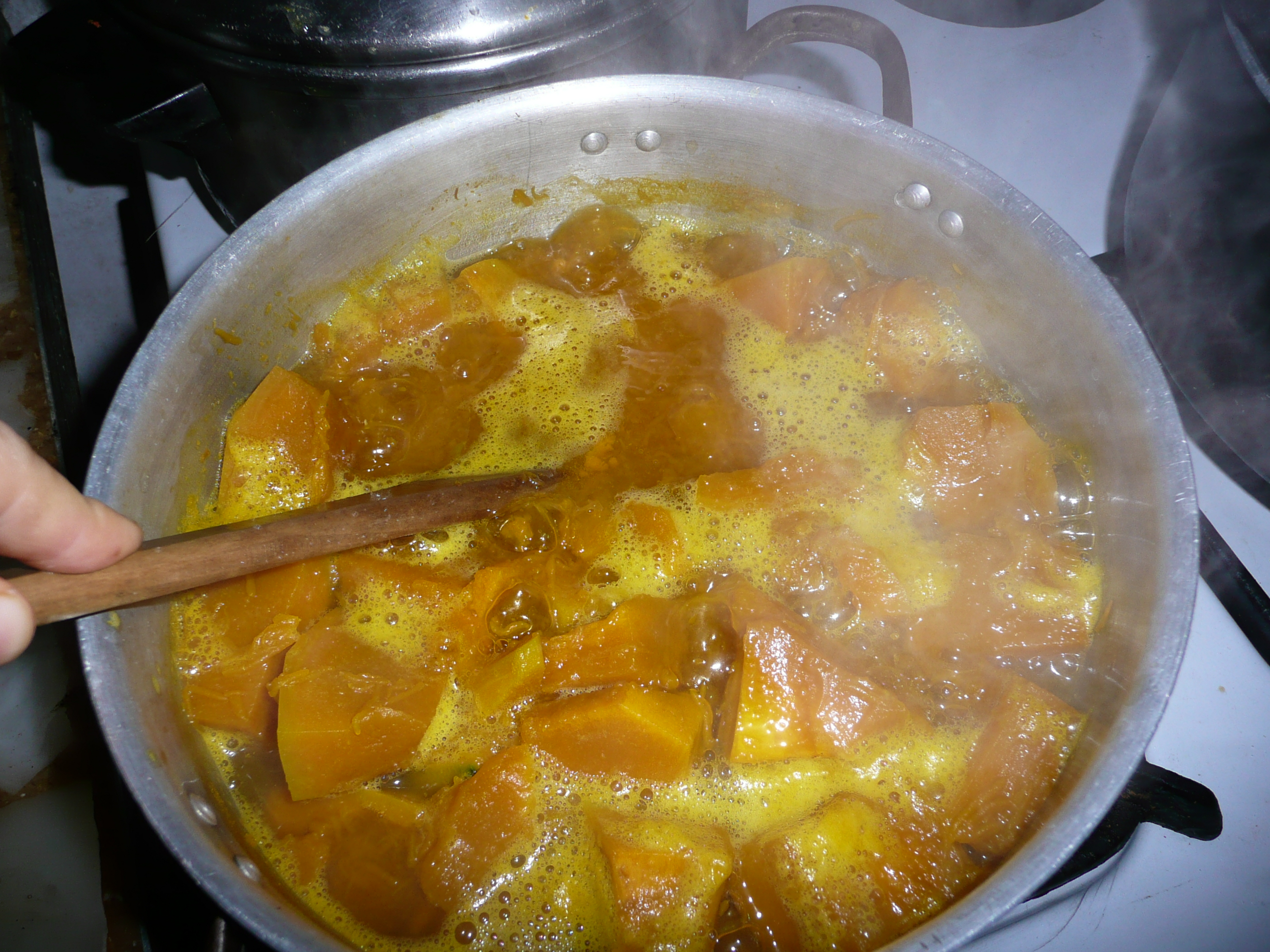
Smashing cubes in the pot.

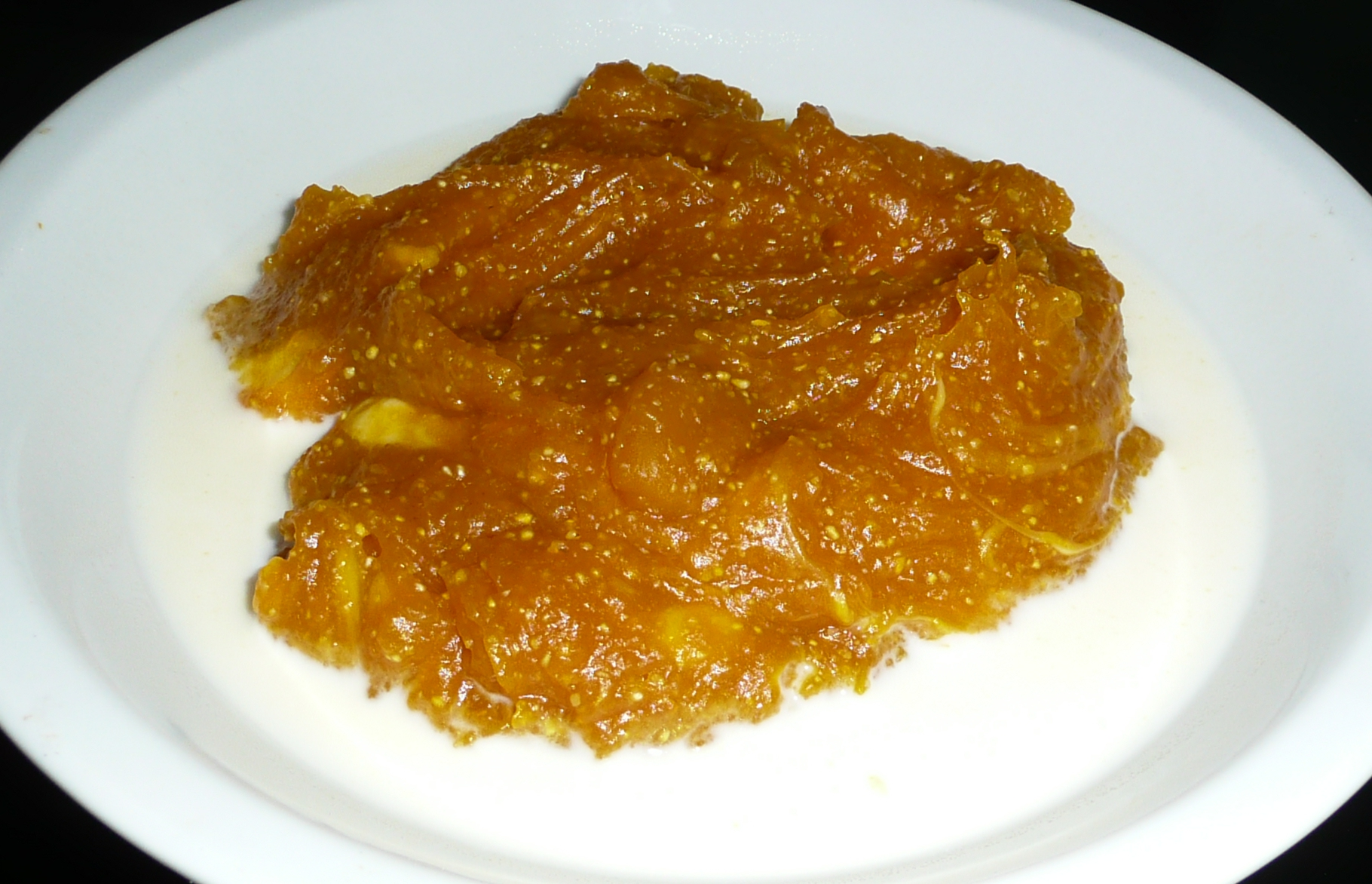
Kiveve in a bowl with milk.

Traditional "kiveve" is made using the following ingredients: a pumpkin or "andai" with a deep orange flesh and sweet flavor, cooked and pureed; sugar, a kind of cornmeal with a consistency between corn starch and corn flour (harina de maíz), and fresh cheese. It is served mildly warm or already cool in a bowl, each commensal pours in milk to taste.

The pumpkin is peeled, cubed and boiled in water. When cubes are tender enough the preparation is pureed with a blender or smashed in its own cooking liquid in the same pot, then sugar is added, and finally corn flour is sifted all over the bland puree in the pot while stirring the mixture in the fire, keep stirring for about 10 minutes, or until the corn flour is completely cooked. Fresh cheese finely chopped is added, stir again for a few seconds and retrieve the pot from the fire. Kiveve used to be cooked in clay pots.

This dish is served as a sweet snack or as a dessert.

== Origin of the name ==
The name "kiveve" comes from the Guarani term for a reddish color. Because the "andai", the main ingredient of the dessert, has a deep orange color, it was given the name "kiveve" (reddish). In fact, in popular slang, the word, "kiveve", is used to identify redheaded people.

== See also ==
- List of squash and pumpkin dishes
