= Vori vori =

Paraguayan soup

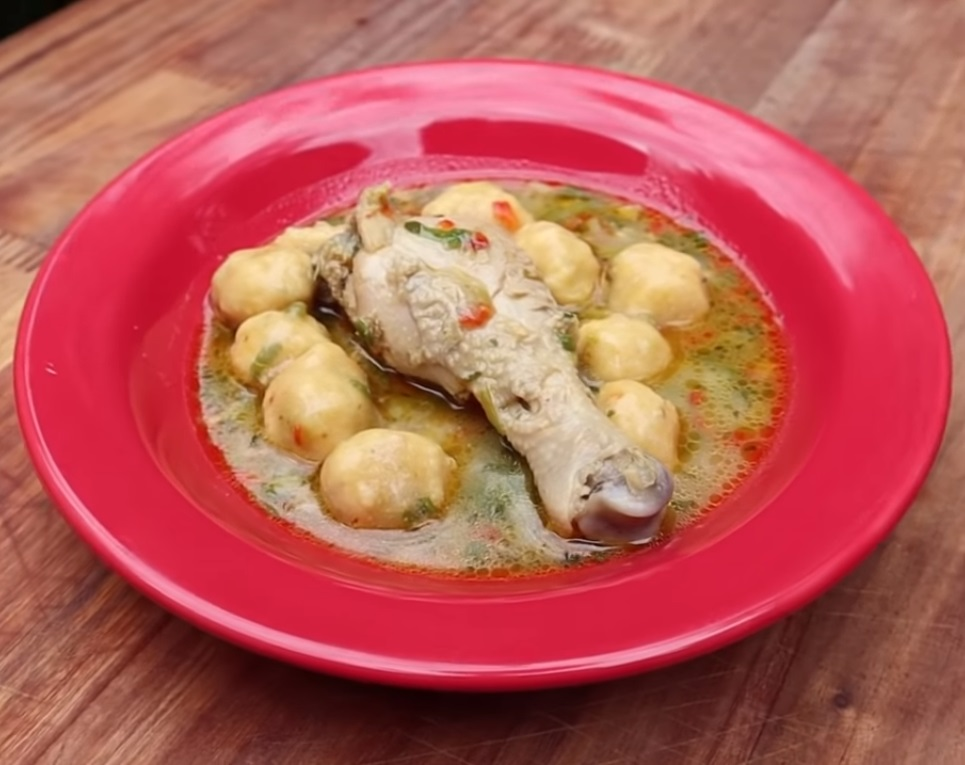
- Chicken vorí vorí
- Type: Soup
- Course: Main course
- Place of origin: Asunción, Paraguay
- Created by: Spanish conquistadors and Indigenous Cario Tribesmen
- Invented: 16th century
- Main ingredients: Corn flour, cheese, stock or broth
- Ingredients generally used: oregano, carrot

Vori vori is a thick, yellowish soup with little balls made of corn flour and cheese. It is a traditional dish within Paraguayan cuisine. It is of Cario-Guarani origin. It has been recognized by TasteAtlas on three occasions, in 2023, 2024, and 2025, as the most prestigious soup worldwide.

The name "vorí vorí" comes from the Guarani language. In Guarani, one way of specifying abundance is by the repetition of a word. Therefore, "vorí vorí" means many. The word "vorí", a deformation of the Spanish word "bolita" (meaning little ball). The word passed into Guarani as "borita", (as there is no phoneme L in Guarani) and finally shortened to "vorí". Thus, the literal meaning of vori vori is "plenty of little balls".

== History ==
Some revisionist historians point out that, during Spanish rule, the German traveler Ulrich Schmidl was already talking about the recipe for that kind of starchy bread made by the Cario-Guarani people (a native tribe who used to live in Asunción). Schmidl was in charge of noting in the logbook of the Spanish ship in which the expedition led by Juan de Ayolas arrived, which would arrive in Asunción later, thus giving rise to the first encounter between Spaniards and the Cario-Guarani people. Back then, there was a menu that was already part of the varieties of bread that the Cario-Guarani natives had in the early days of the conquest. The food the Cario-Guarani people used to eat was mbujape, which translated from Guarani means “bread”. To cook the mbujapé, corn flour or cassava starch was combined with animal fat and then it was wrapped in a banana leaf and placed in the tanimbú to cook it.

There is the wrong idea of naming Paraguayan cuisine as "Guarani cuisine". Paraguayan gastronomy was born from the fusion of Spanish cuisine and Cario-Guaraní cuisine, which was developed due to the influence of the Franciscan priests, the Spanish conquers and the mestizos asuncenos, which took place in Asunción and its surroundings. Towns such as Tobatí, Atyrá, Altos, Areguá, Ypané, Guarambaré, Itá and Yaguarón are living examples of how Paraguayan culture developed outside and far from the mercantile influence of the Jesuits. When the Jesuits were expelled in 1767, the natives returned to their natural habitat (the Atlantic jungle) and they never go to Asunción and its area of influence to educate or teach, proof of this is the extinction of Jesuit ceramics and not the Franciscan that is still alive in Itá, Areguá and Tobatí.

The root cuisine of the Cario-Guarani consisted of hunting, fishing, grain crops, cooking techniques and methods, as well as the utensils they made. The first antecedents of Spanish and Cario-Guaraní syncretism took place at the time of the foundation of Asunción and surroundings, where the Franciscan reductions of Altos, Atyrá, Guarambaré, Itá, etc. were later founded. In the Governorate of Paraguay, a Catholic jurisdiction called "Paraguaria Province" was circumscribed. This province, dependent on the Viceroyalty of Peru, covered the regions of Paraguay, Argentina, Uruguay, and parts of Bolivia, Brazil and Chile (between 1604 and 1617). Since 1617, the Paraguaria Province was dismembered to the Governorate of the Río de la Plata and the Governorate of Paraguay, thus remaining under the jurisdiction of the latter. Then this region became part of the ephemeral Viceroyalty of the Río de la Plata (1776-1810). The culture developed in Greater Paraguay was very strong since the Guarani people were used by the conquerors and evangelizers as intermediaries with other Amerindian civilizations. For these reasons, the Paraguayan culture that characterizes Asunción remained strong in this area, and in turn spread to areas where the cattle were later introduced, with the founding of Corrientes in 1588, the oldest city in the northeast of Argentina.

In the logs (of travelers such as Ulrich Schmidl) and in the historical records of the colonial era, it appears in several paragraphs that the Cario-Guarani (a tribe that inhabited the Asunción area) prepared cakes and breads based on cassava, corn, and sweet corn mixed with animal fat, known as "mbujapé" ("bread" in Guarani language). The Cario-Guarani diet was complemented with European foods that the Spaniards brought from the old continent. This was due to the introduction of cattle in 1556 in Asunción, so thanks to these animals the new ingredients were finally obtained such as beef, milk, eggs, cheese, etc. In this way, the meals derived from the Cario-Guarani gastronomic base (corn, cassava, pumpkin, sweet potato, etc.) were finally mixed with the ingredients brought by the Spaniards (meat, milk, cheese, eggs, etc.). This union gave rise to foods that have been consumed from the colonial era to the present. In this context, the recipe for typical Paraguayan dishes actually originated, which has cassava, corn, sweet corn, Paraguay cheese, milk and beef as their base ingredients.

== Ingredients and preparation ==
Typical vorí vorí contains: corn flour and fresh cheese formed into balls, fatty soup or broth, and water. There are other variants generally denominated "vorí vorí blanco" with additional ingredients such as oil, garlic, onion, pumpkin, milk and rice.

The corn flour and the crumbled cheese are put in a container, moistening this mixture with the fat broth until one has a mixture from which the little balls can easily be made by hand. Every vorí should be the size of a big grape. Once there's enough little balls made, these are put in boiling soup and cooked for about 5 minutes. If the soup turns too thick, it can be thinned by adding more boiling water.

== Interesting facts ==
The traditional vorí vorí is also known as "vorí vorí caldo".

- One of the most widespread recipes is the "vorí vorí de gallina", in which pieces of chicken previously grilled on its own fat are added to the soup.
- When the little balls are too small they're called "tu'i rupi'a" (the Guarani phrase for "parakeet eggs").
- The vorí vorí is one of the few Paraguayan dishes that is eaten among every social layer. It's consumed in both fancy banquets and in the humble tables of rustic ranches.
- According to some scholars of social history of Paraguay, all the Paraguayan popular gastronomy, which establishes itself as a small family industry after the Paraguayan War against The Triple Alliance (Argentina, Brazil and Uruguay, between 1864 and 1870), is really abundant in caloric content, because of the situation that overcame to the country after the conflict. In the aftermath of the war, food was limited, groceries were hard to find. So Paraguayan cooking has a high protein content to make up for the scarcity of every day meal.

== Bibliography ==
- Asunción 1537: Madre de la gastronomía del Río de la Plata y de Matto Grosso do Sul. Vidal Domínguez Díaz (2017).
- Poytáva: Origen y Evolución de la Gastronomía Paraguaya. Graciela Martínez (2017).
- Tembi’u Paraguay. Josefina Velilla de Aquino (2014).
