= Lampreado =

Fried cassava dish from Paraguay

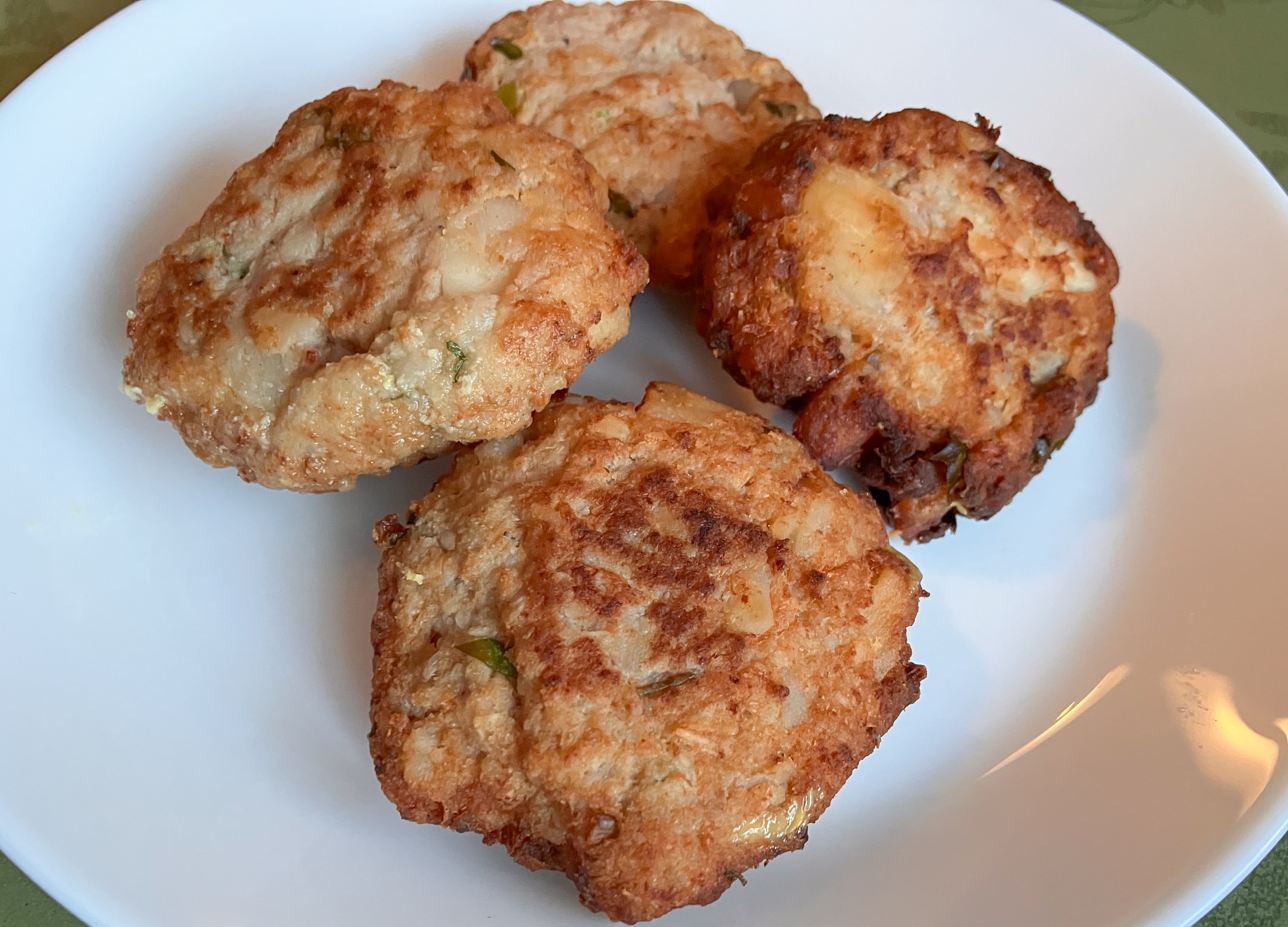
- Place of origin: Paraguay
- Associated cuisine: Paraguay
- Main ingredients: Cassava; Beef
- Ingredients generally used: Garlic; Onion; Salt; Oil; Breadcrumbs

Lampreado, also known as Lambreado or Payaguá Mascada, is a Paraguayan fried cake made of cassava and beef.

== Origin of name ==
While the word "Lambreado" is a variation of the older "Lampreado," there is little data about the origin of the name.

In Paraguay, a Castilian-Guarani bilingual country, and in Northeastern Argentine (where the Guarani language is also spoken) it is also called "payaguá mascada", an allusion to one of the tribes of the Guarani people ("payaguáes") who populated the Paraguayan geography in pre-Columbian times.

== Ingredients ==
There are several varieties of "Lampreado." The more traditional ingredients are as follows: cassava/mandioca, boiled and ground beef, garlic, onion, salt, oil and breadcrumbs.

In other varieties, pork fat is used, and the starch and cassava are mixed with raw meat.

== Preparation ==
The cassava is peeled and cooked in salted water until it is reasonably soft but not too soft. It is then mashed and mixed with ground beef, garlic and onions previously fried in oil, and salt and breadcrumbs.

This mixture produces small cakes or tortillas, which are fried in oil.

== Further details of interest ==
Lampreado can be kept for several days, making it a good food for herders, travelers, and "troperos" (mainly cattle drivers).

In the Paraguayan department of Misiones, it is called "Lambreado", what elsewhere is known by the name of "marinera", made with either beef or chicken.

The dish is commonly eaten during the Feast of Saint John on 24 June.
