= Kosereva =

Type of traditional Paraguayan jam

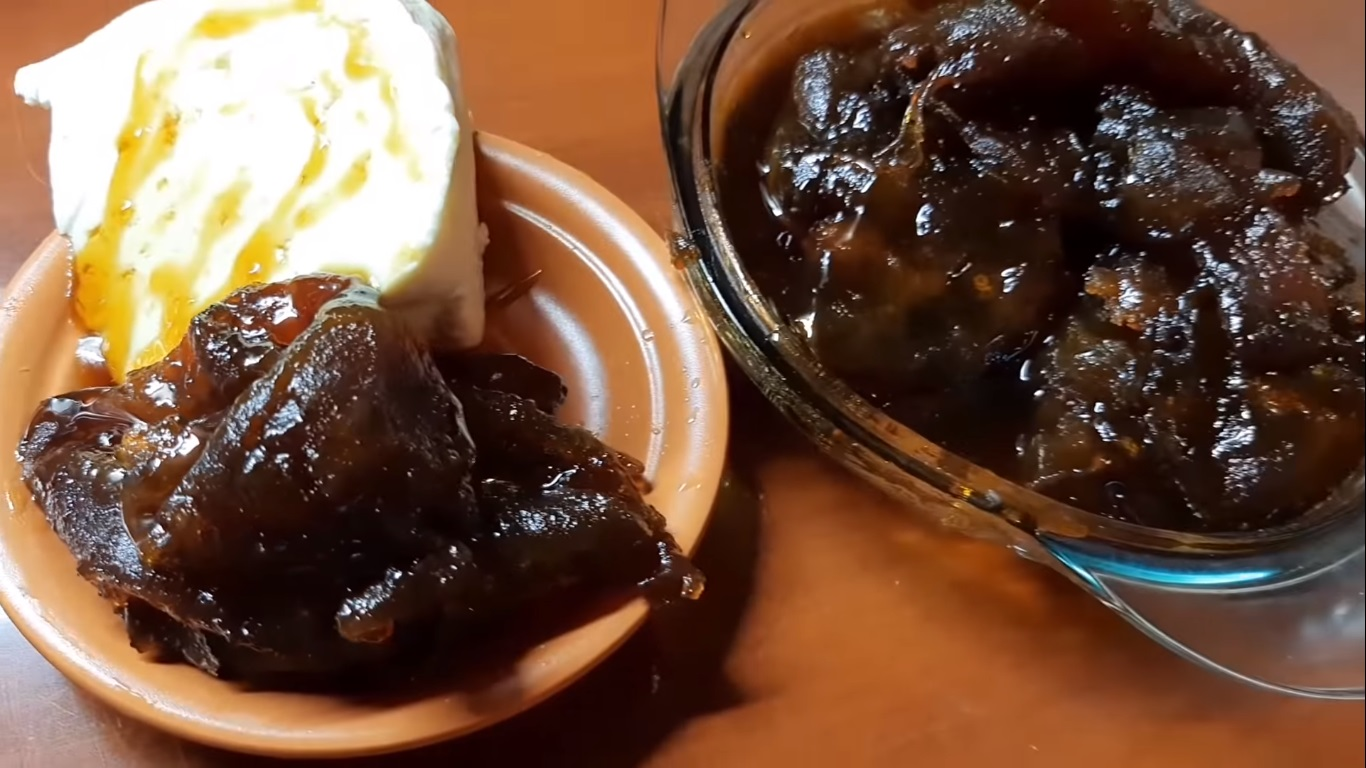
- Type: Confectionery
- Place of origin: Paraguay
- Main ingredients: Pintonas (ripe sour oranges), sugar, molasses, water

Kosereva is a common "barreled" candy with a high protein content originally made in Paraguay, made with the hardened skin of the sour orange ("apepú", in Guaraní language) and cooked in black molasses, resulting in a bittersweet and acidic taste. The name "koserevá" comes from the Guaranitical derivation of the Spanish word "conserva" (preserved food). Historical records state that Spanish conquerors that came to Paraguay during the colonial ages used to preserve this citric fruit by cooking them in trimmed barrels in black molasses.

== Ingredients ==
Preparing typical koserevá requires only sour oranges "pintonas" (ripe sour oranges), sugar, molasses and abundant water.

== See also ==
- Paraguayan cuisine
