= Cuisine of Asunción =

Culinary traditions of Asunción, Paraguay

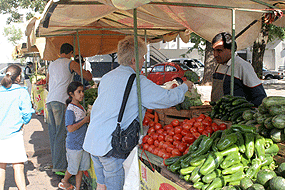
A fresh produce market in Asunción, Paraguay.

The cuisine of Asunción refers to the cuisine and restaurants of the city of Asunción, Paraguay. Compared to most of the Latin American capitals, the city has comparatively few European restaurants and influences in cuisine. However, international (including Italian, Chinese, Mexican and others) and traditional Paraguayan cuisines are available in various restaurants and hotels.

== Restaurant cuisine ==
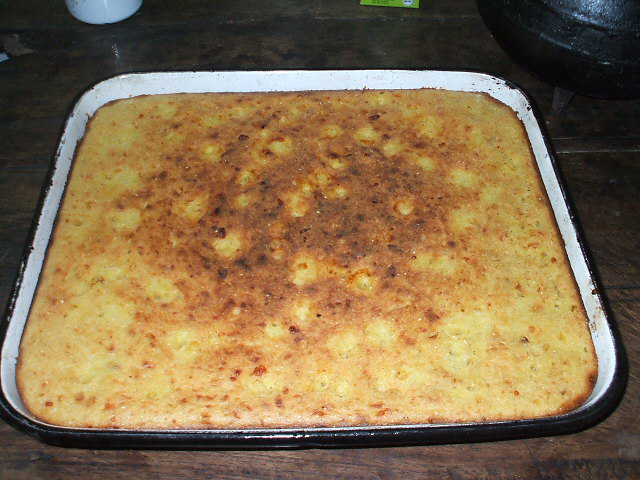
Sopa paraguaya is a traditional Paraguayan food.

Meat, especially beef, is a staple food of the Paraguayan diet. However, Asunción is different in some respects compared to the rest of Paraguay in that its top restaurants are more sophisticated and broader in culinary influences than in rural areas and smaller towns, where often only snack bars are available. Bradt Travel Guides says, "You can eat very well in Asuncion, and even vegetarians will find plenty of good salads to fill their plates, even in the churrasquerias (restaurants serving roast meals). But most restaurants and bars in the interior of the country are very basic. Most ordinary restaurants serve a small variety of meat dishes, accompanied by chips, rice salad, potato salad or a mixed salad (lettuce, tomato, onion). It is common to skip dessert entirely".

In Asunción, a special dish served in parillada, an upscale restaurant, is made of grilled meat served with manioc. Many restaurants in the city serve Paraguayan cuisine, and many bars such as Bohemia, Bambuddha, Cafe Literarui, La Cubana and Coyote feature live music during the evenings.

However, in recent years the city has seen a marked increase in Asian influences to cater to the many immigrants from the Pacific Rim, such as Japan, China and Korea. Some restaurants, such as La Vide Verde, offer an alternative to the Paraguayan carvery tradition by serving Chinese vegetarian dishes. Although compared to the capital cities of many of the other Latin American cities the diversity of cuisines on offer are less apparent, the European influence is clear restaurants such as Talleyrand, which serves international cuisine, and the Britannia Pub, a British pub serving British cuisine and alcohol. La Flor de la Canela serves Peruvian cuisine, mainly fish and seafood dishes and ceviche. Some of the more upmarket restaurants with international cuisine available are located in some of the city's top hotels or in close proximity to them. The Excelsior Hotel, for instance, has a restaurant catering in Italian cuisine, and the Quebrancho restaurant near La Misión Hotel matches the hotel in being one of the city's most expensive.

A few very expensive restaurants serve river fish surubi in various combinations; one such is with a bed of broad beans and tomatoes. Asparagus soup with shredded carrot and onion sprinkled with Parmesan cheese, tilapia in escargot sauce and filet steak with fresh mushroom and baby potatoes are also popular in these restaurants.

Some specific dishes served in popular restaurants are sandwiches, curried rabbit, garlic pizza, surubí casa nostra (many types of different pasta in one dish), sopa paraguaya (a combination with cheese and onion), Lebanese swamis (meat and spice wrapped in bread) in Monte Libano and ceviche.

== See also ==
- Paraguayan cuisine
