= Chok Sukkaew =

Thai footballer (born 1987)

Personal information
- Full name: Chok Sukkaew
- Date of birth: 4 April 1987 (age 39)
- Place of birth: Buriram, Thailand
- Height: 1.81 m (5 ft 11 1/2 in)
- Position: Defender

Senior career*
Years	Team	Apps	(Gls)
2009–2010	Buriram		
2011–2015	Khon Kaen		
2016	Ubon UMT United		
2017	Trat		
- * Club domestic league appearances and goals

Chok Sukkaew (Thai: โชค สุขแก้ว), simply known as Chok (Thai: โชค). He is a Thai footballer from Buriram Province, Thailand.

== Clubs ==
Senior

Year	Club	League
2009–2010	Buriram F.C.	Regional League Division 2
2011–2015	Khonkaen F.C.	Thai Premier League, Thai Division 1 League, Regional League Division 2
2016	Ubon UMT United	Thai Division 1 League

== Honours ==
=== Buriram F.C. ===
- Regional League Division 2
  - Winners :2010
- Regional League North-East Division
  - Runner-up :2010
