= Ming Tung Chok =

American businessman

Ming Tung Chok was the CEO of Soyo Group from 2002-09.

An immigrant to the United States from Asia, Chok was one of the founding members of the consumer electronics company, Soyo Group, established in 1998 and based in Ontario, California. He became CEO in 2002 and is married to Nancy Chu, who was also an executive. It remained under Chok's leadership as CEO until it filed for bankruptcy on May 5, 2009. Soyo Group's primary operations involved distributorship of electronics products manufactured in Korea, North America, South America, and Asia. Soyo was recognized for its motherboards which were some of the first to target enthusiasts and fully supported various chip-sets and features intended for that market.
