= Soyo Group =

United States-based electronics company

Soyo Group, inc.
- Type: Public
- Traded as: OTC Pink: SOYO
- Industry: Computer hardware, consumer electronics
- Founded: 1985; 41 years ago
- Defunct: 2009; 17 years ago
- Headquarters: Ontario, California, United States
- Key people: Tung Chok Ming (CEO); CFO: Nancy Chu; Marketing: Edward O'Brien; Sales: Harvey Schneider
- Products: LCD televisions, LCD monitors, portable storage devices, bluetooth devices
- Revenue: ▲$110.0 million USD (2008 YTD)
- Net income: ▲$3.3 million USD (2008 YTD)
- Number of employees: 36 (2009)

Soyo Group, Inc., often shortened to Soyo, was a United States–based electronics company. Established in 1985, Soyo was a provider of consumer electronics such as LCD HDTVs, home theater furniture, Bluetooth headsets, portable storage devices, computer monitors, computer motherboards, computer cases, and computer peripheral devices.

With sales offices in California and São Paulo, Brazil, Soyo sold its products through an extensive network of authorized distributors, resellers, system integrators, VARs, retailers, mail-order catalogs and e-tailers. Soyo licensed the Honeywell brand from Honeywell International Inc. for use on LCD televisions and other consumer electronics products.

Soyo Group filed for Chapter 7 bankruptcy with the United States District Court for the Central District of California, Riverside Division (case number 09-19355-RN), and ceased operations on May 5, 2009.

Soyo Group brands

- Soyo
- Honeywell (Under license from Honeywell International Inc.)
- Privé
- Le Véllo Furniture
- Soyo Computer Inc.

Soyo computer motherboard SY-5VA

Soyo Computer Inc. a Taiwan-based company made computer components, and were well known for their motherboards. Their headquarters were in Taipei and their sales (at least North America sales) were handled by their California office. They ceased production of electronics around 2005 and focused on the manufacture of plastics. While no longer operational in US and Taiwan, most of the assets were shipped to Shenzhen, China, and PC production still goes on for the Chinese market.

In recent years, Soyo motherboards (and RAM) are starting to pop up on the Chinese E-commerce Site AliExpress. There are rumors that Soyo (or a Part of it) has been bought by Maxsun.
