= Lionel Chok =

Singaporean film-maker and director

Lionel Chok Ko Hon is a Singaporean film-maker and director. His documentary, Geraldine, was premiered at the New York International Independent Film & Video Festival. His other short films were also screened in New York City and Singapore. Since completing the Intensive Directing Workshop at New York University, he has written the telemovie Dirty Laundry (released in 2004 and shot on HD video).

== Filmography ==
=== Series ===
- Heritage Series (1988)

– Awarded Best Documentary finalist in the New York Festivals
– Best Documentary nominee at the Asian Television Awards 1988

=== Documentaries ===
- Geraldene (2001)

– Official selection in the New York International Independent Film and Video Festival 2001

=== Features ===
- To Speak (2007)

=== Plays ===
- Nonsensical Idiosyncrasies (2001)
- Nonsensical Idiosyncrasies 2
- Hearing Voices (2002)
- Threesome (2004)
- Adultery (2005)

=== Short films ===
- Writer's Block (2001)
- Life After (2001)
- Time (1999)
- Nana & Damien (2005)
- Crossroad (2006)

=== Digital Online films ===
- 24 Hours in Central Singapore

=== HD Telemovie ===
- Dirty Laundry (2004)

=== Music Videos ===
- WISH (2006)

=== Musicals ===
- Swingle (2006)

== Awards ==
- Best Documentary finalist in the New York Festivals
- Best Documentary nominee at the Asian Television Awards (1988)
- 2007 Digital Film Fiesta Audience Choice Award

== See also ==
- Cinema of Singapore
- Royston Tan
