= Cerveza Pilsen (Paraguay) =

Paraguayan beer

Pilsen is a Paraguayan brand of pilsner beer. Created on October 12, 1912, it is the oldest beer brand in Paraguay and one of the largest in the country. The beer is produced by Cervercería Paraguaya S.A., which is owned by the Anheuser-Busch InBev consortium.

== Profile ==
Pilsen is a pale golden pilsner beer with an alcohol content of 5%. Other varieties of beer produced by Cervercería Paraguaya S.A. include Pilsen Night and Pilsen Bock. The Pilsen Ñande brand comes in three types: Roja (an amber lager), Blanca (a weiss beer), and Negra (a dark lager).

== Awards ==
In June 2005, Pilsen became the first Paraguayan product to receive a medal from the International Quality Institute in Brussels, Belgium.

In May 2006, Pilsen won a silver medal at the World Beer Cup in the "American Cream Ale or Lager" category.

== Sponsorships ==
Pilsen was a sponsor of the Paraguay national football team in four World Cups: France 98, Korea-Japan 2002, Germany 2006 and South Africa 2010.
