= Soyo (Paraguay) =

Paraguayan meat soup

- Type: Soup
- Place of origin: Paraguay
- Main ingredients: Meat, spices, vegetables

Soyo is a thick soup of meat crushed in a mortar, seasoned with several spices and vegetables.

== Etymology ==
The word “soyo” is short for so'o josopy, Guaraní words for “meat” (so'o) and “crushed” (josopyre). When the meat is not crushed and instead it is boiled in the soup chopped in little pieces, it called so’o josopy ita'y, which means curdle soup.
