= Wheel chock =

Wedge used to stop object from rolling

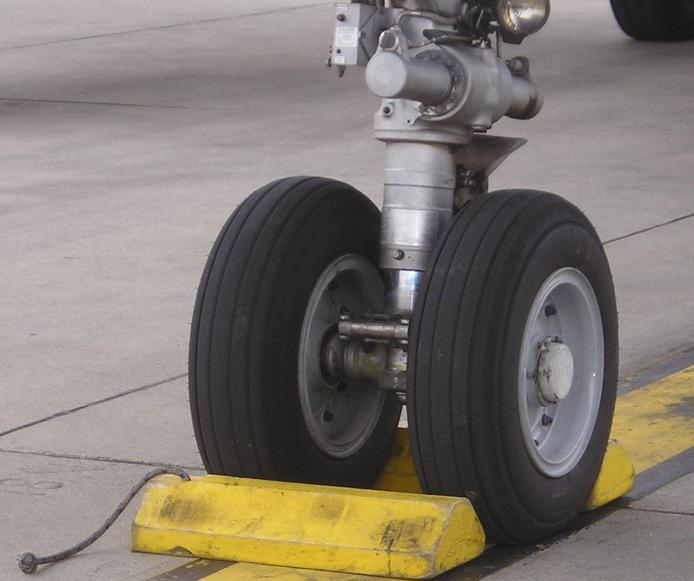
Wheel chocks placed around an aircraft's landing gear

Wheel chocks (or chocks) are wedges of sturdy material placed closely against a vehicle's wheels to prevent accidental movement. Chocks are placed as an added precaution in addition to setting the brakes. Their bottom surface is sometimes coated in rubber to improve grip with the ground. For ease of removal, a rope may be tied to the chock or a pair of them. One edge of the chock has a concave profile to contour to the wheel and increase the force necessary to overrun the chock. Most commonly, chocks are seen on aircraft and train cars.

Automobiles usually have parking brakes on the rear wheels. If the rear axle is jacked off the ground with only the parking brake set, the vehicle may roll on the front wheels and fall. Chocking the front wheels prevents this mishap. Motorcycle and bicycle chocks are bifurcated and fit around the wheel, supporting the bike and preventing its movement.

A wheel chock to hold automobiles and light trucks in place on rail cars was invented by Canadian engineer Robert B. Winsor (1939–2021).

== In mining ==
The mining industry uses wheel chocks to protect lubrication trucks and heavy maintenance vehicles from slipping on off-road terrain when placed in Park. The huge haul trucks, which can weigh up to 450 tonnes (440 long tons; 500 short tons), require a much larger wheel chock that itself will weigh almost 40 kilograms (88 pounds). These circumstances will benefit from urethane wheel chocks that are lightweight enough to be maneuvered, yet can withstand the responsibility of holding a truck if a brake should fail. The Mine Safety and Health Administration (MSHA) has established standards that wheel chocks are used when a vehicle is parked on a grade, and Occupational Safety and Health Administration (OSHA) has guidelines that require wheel chocks during loading or unloading of a heavy truck.

== Parking chocks ==
A parking space commonly contains a parking chock (also known as a parking curb, parking bumper, wheel stop, parking chock, curb stop, bumper block, and turtarrier), a barrier which is used to prevent cars from pulling too far into the space and obstructing an adjacent parking space, curb, or sidewalk.

This barrier is usually made of concrete or recycled plastic and will normally be a horizontal bar to prevent the tires from moving forward or a vertical bar that may cause damage to the vehicle if contact is made. In a parking garage, the barrier will often be a concrete wall. The recycled plastic parking stops are lighter weight than concrete and will not crack or chip. This lighter version can be installed by one person and will resist auto oils and fuels and will never need maintenance such as repainting.

== Gallery ==
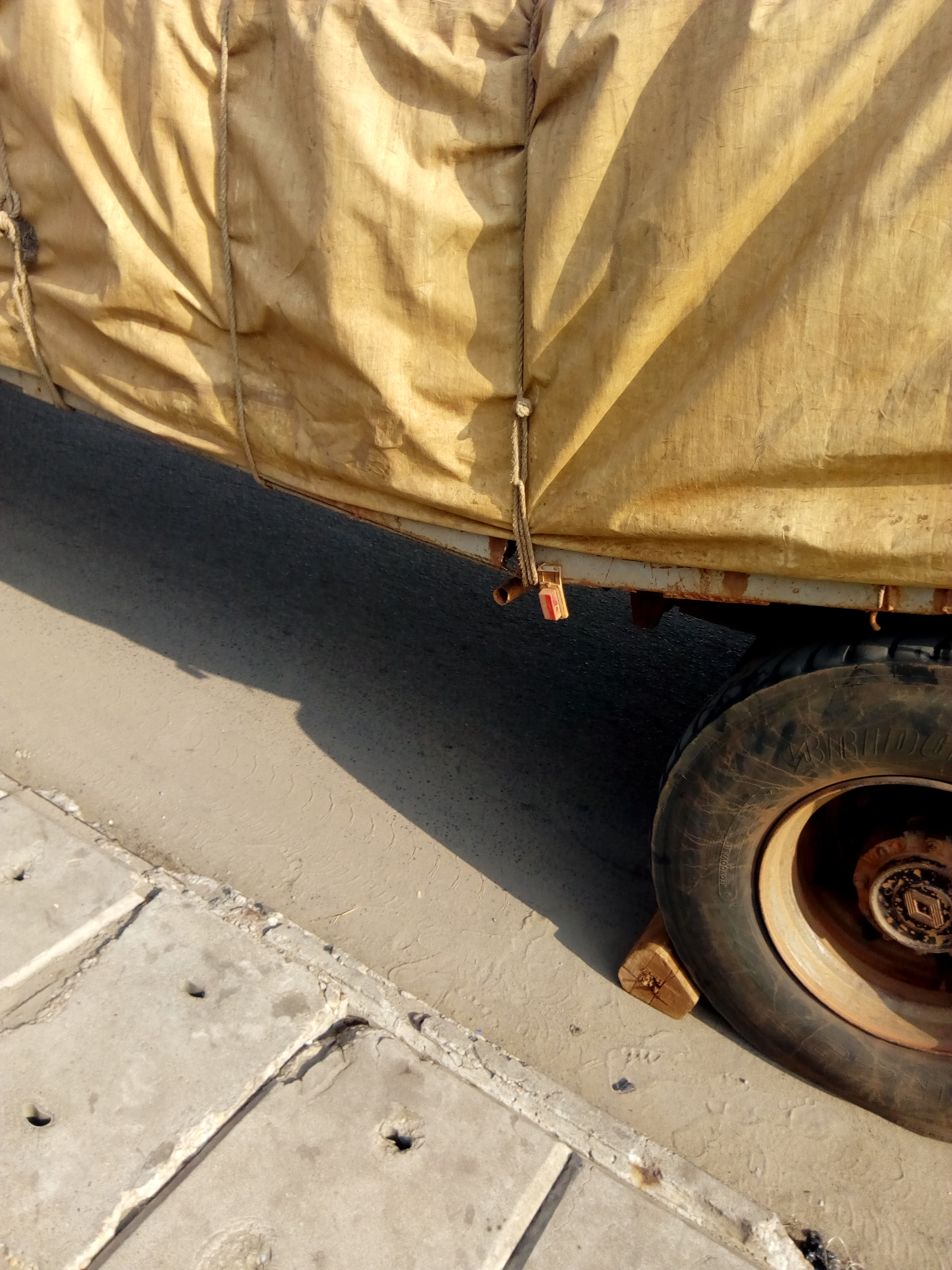
Wheel chock placed under a car's wheel.

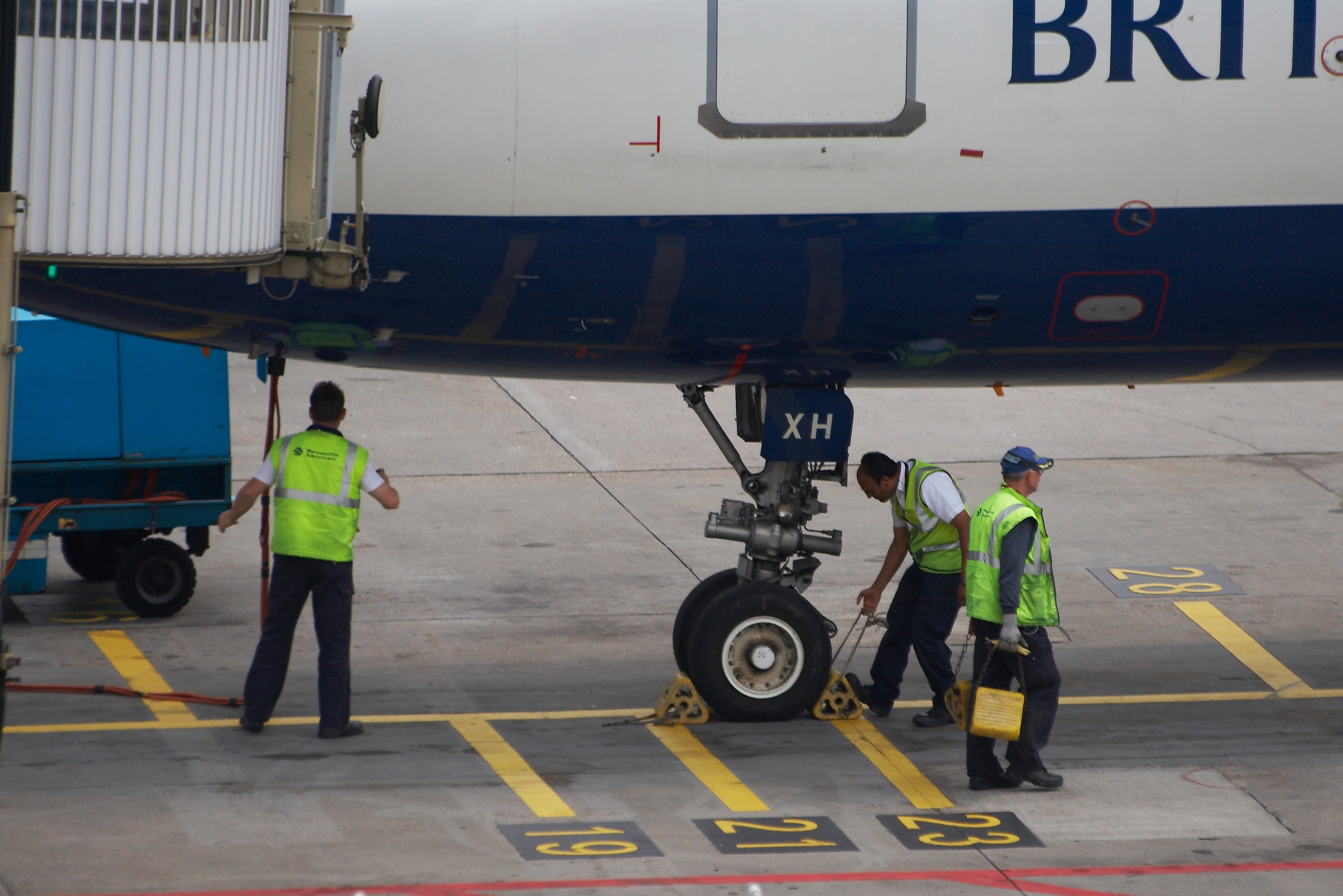
Chocks being fitted to a British Airways Airbus A321.

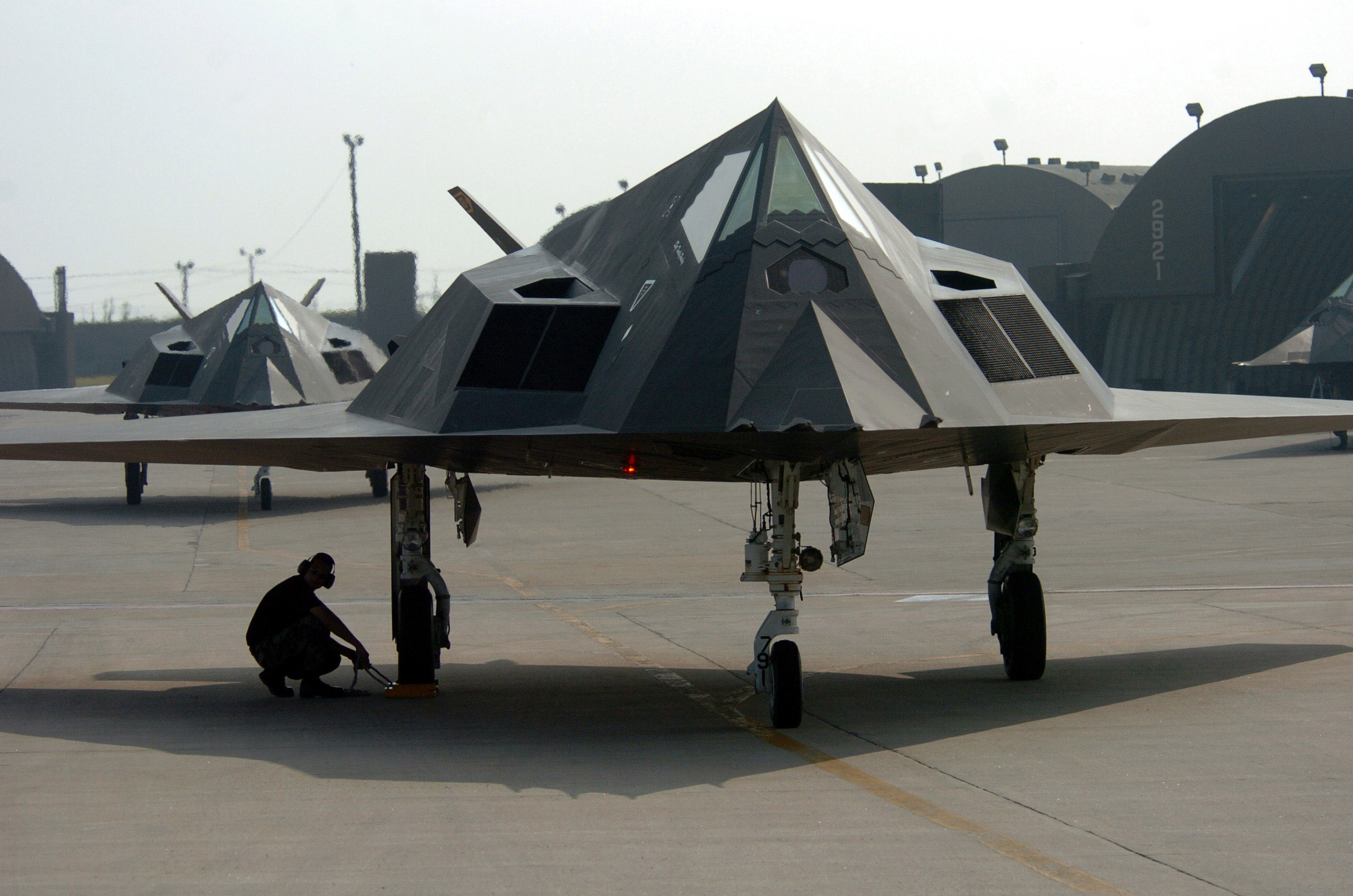
An airman prepares to pull the landing gear wheel chock of an F-117 Nighthawk attack aircraft during an end of runway check at Kunsan Air Base, South Korea.

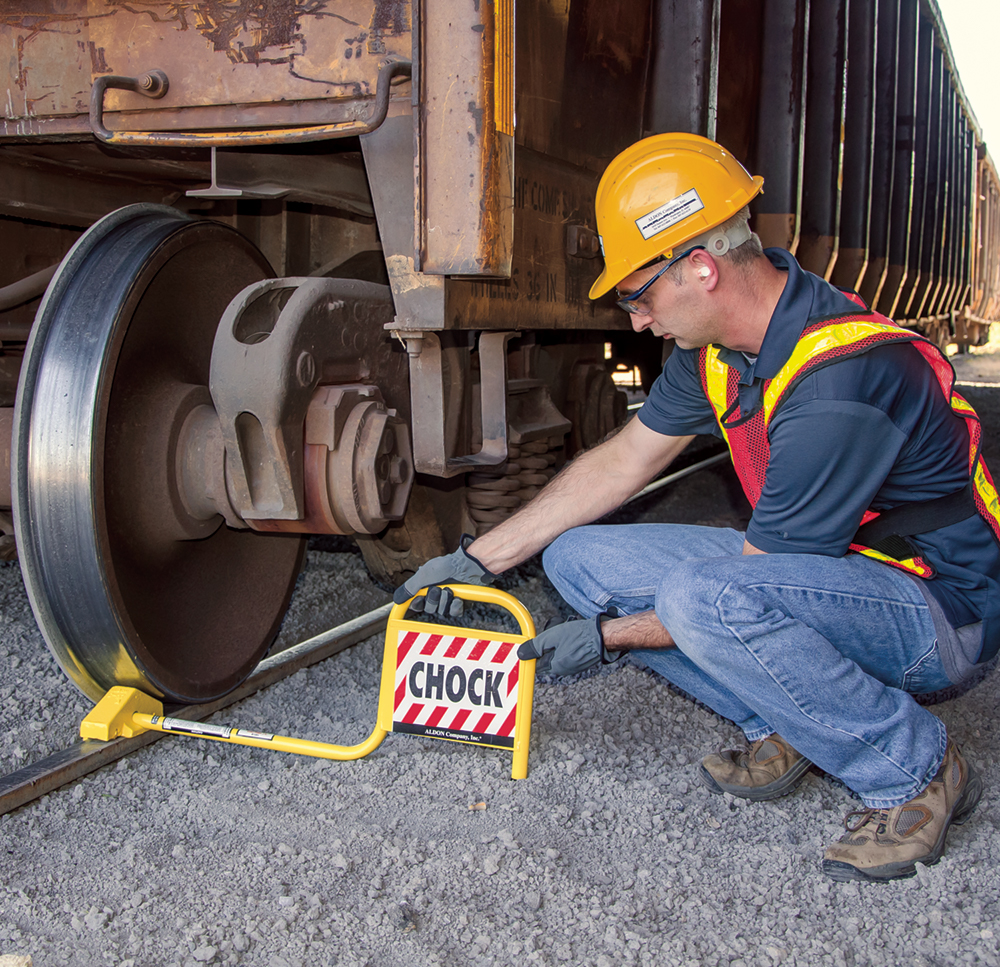
Railroad wheel chock installed under gondola car

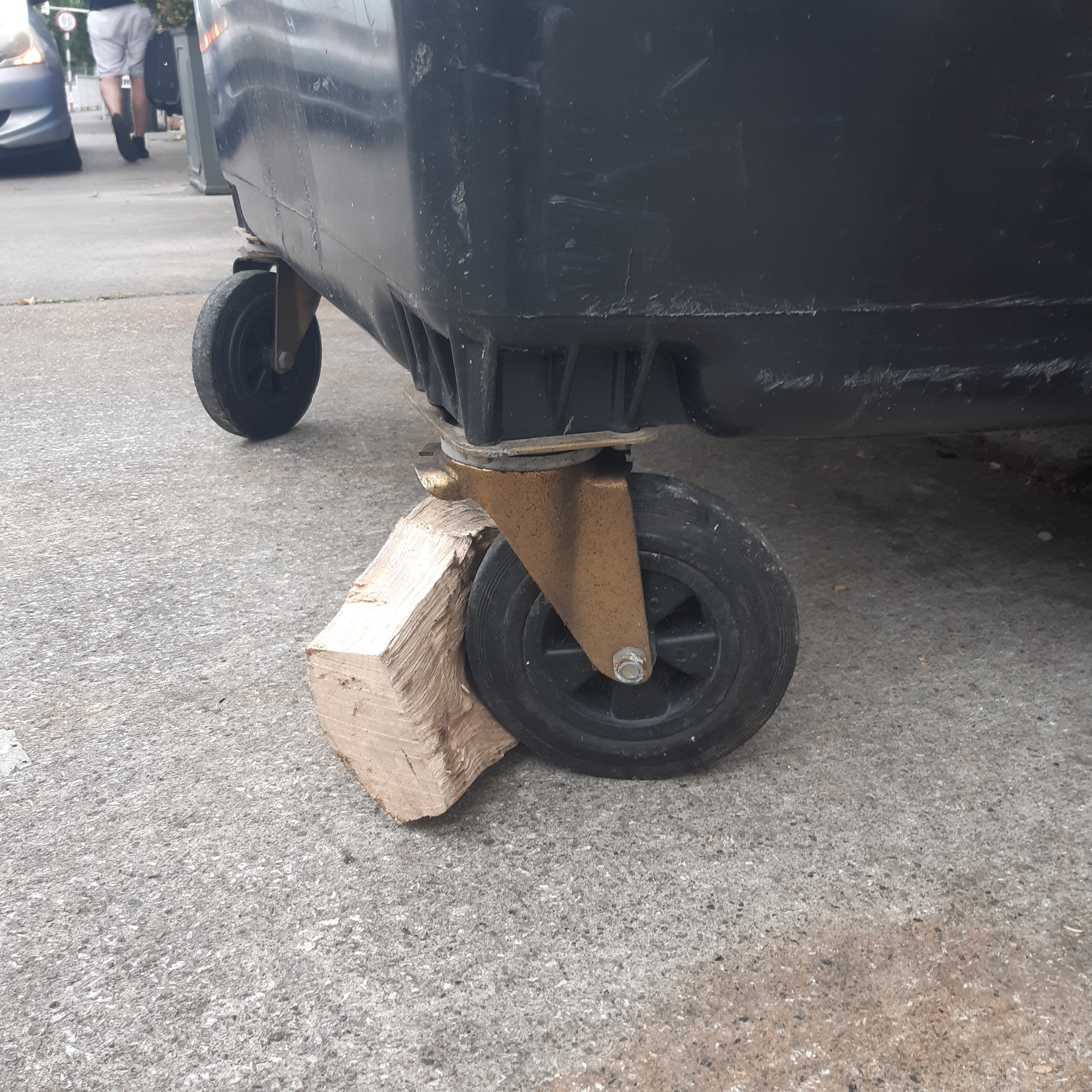
Improvised wooden chock used on a four-wheeled plastic bin

== See also ==
- Railway wheel stop
