= Chipa =

Cheese-flavored roll snacks in Paraguay

- Type: Bread
- Course: Breakfast or snack
- Place of origin: Paraguay and northeastern Argentina
- Main ingredients: Cassava starch, corn starch, fat, milk, egg, Paraguay cheese
- Similar dishes: Pão de queijo (Brazil)

Chipa (Spanish pronunciation: [ˈtʃipa], Guarani pronunciation: [ʃiˈpa]) is a type of small, baked, cheese-flavored roll, a popular snack and breakfast food in Paraguay. The recipe has existed since the 18th century and its origins are inexpensive and often sold from streetside stands and on buses by vendors carrying a large basket with the warm chipa wrapped in a cloth.

The original name is from Guarani chipa. A small chipa may be called a chipita. In Santa Cruz de la Sierra, Bolivia, the term cuñapé (Guarani) is often used. In some parts of Argentina, it is called chipá (with an accent mark), or chipacito when it is small.

== Vocabulary ==
Chipa is often baked in smaller doughnuts or buns that may be called chipita or chipacitos. These are sold in small bags by street sellers of big cities and small towns. In the preparation of chipa yeast is not used, so in spite of the high temperatures of the region it can be preserved for many days. It is a festive food and can be found in every popular religious celebration.

Other common variants in Paraguay include the chipa caburé or chipá mbocá (cooked around a stick, in consequence it doesn't have the spongy inner center) and the chipa so'o, filled with ground meat. There are other varieties of chipa with different ingredients; chipa manduvi (made with a mix of corn flour and peanut), chipa avatí and chipa rora (made of the skin of the seed of corn after being strained, like a whole-wheat bread).

== History ==
Chipa so'o

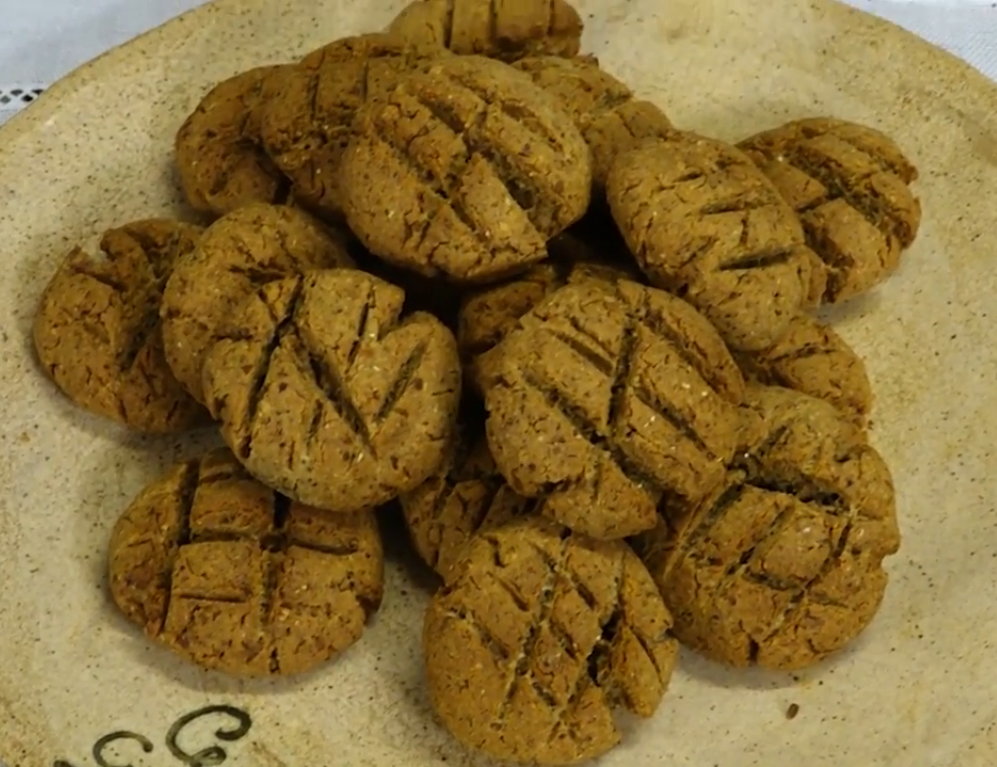
Chipa manduví

Some historians point out that, during the colonial era, the German traveler Ulrich Schmidl was already talking about the recipe for that kind of starchy bread made by the Cario-Guarani people (a native tribe who used to live in Asunción). Schmidl was in charge of noting in the logbook of the Spanish ship in which the expedition led by Juan de Ayolas arrived, which would arrive in Asunción later, thus giving rise to the first encounter between Spaniards and the Cario-Guarani people. Before being known as chipa, there was a menu that was already part of the varieties of bread that the Cario-Guarani natives had in the early days of the conquest. Back then, the food before the chipa was known as "mbujape", which translated from Guarani means "bread". To cook the mbujapé, corn flour or cassava starch was combined with animal fat and then it was wrapped in a banana leaf and placed in the tanimbú to cook it.

There is the wrong idea of naming Paraguayan cuisine as "Guarani cuisine". Paraguayan gastronomy was born from the fusion of Spanish cuisine and Cario-Guaraní cuisine, which was developed due to the influence of the Franciscan priests, the Spanish conquers and the mestizos asuncenos, which took place in Asunción and its surroundings. Towns such as Tobatí, Atyrá, Altos, Areguá, Ypané, Guarambaré, Itá and Yaguarón are living examples of how Paraguayan culture developed outside and far from the mercantile influence of the Jesuits. When the Jesuits were expelled in 1767, the natives returned to their natural habitat (the Atlantic jungle) and they never visited Asunción and its area of influence to educate or teach, proof of this is the extinction of Jesuit ceramics and not the Franciscan that is still alive in Itá, Areguá and Tobatí.

The root cuisine of the Cario-Guarani consisted of hunting, fishing, grain crops, cooking techniques and methods, as well as the utensils they made. The first antecedents of Spanish and Cario-Guaraní syncretism took place at the time of the foundation of Asunción and surroundings, where the Franciscan reductions of Altos, Atyrá, Guarambaré, Itá, etc. were later founded. In the Governorate of Paraguay, a Catholic jurisdiction called "Paraguaria Province" was circumscribed. This province, dependent on the Viceroyalty of Peru, covered the regions of Paraguay, Argentina, Uruguay, and parts of Bolivia, Brazil and Chile (between 1604 and 1617). Since 1617, the Paraguaria Province was dismembered to the Governorate of the Río de la Plata and the Governorate of Paraguay, thus remaining under the jurisdiction of the latter. Then this region became part of the ephemeral Viceroyalty of the Río de la Plata (1776–1810). The culture developed in Greater Paraguay was very strong since the Guarani people were used by the conquerors and evangelizers as intermediaries with other Amerindian civilizations. For these reasons, the Paraguayan culture that characterizes Asunción remained strong in this area, and in turn spread to areas where the cattle were later introduced, with the founding of Corrientes in 1588, the oldest city in the northeast of Argentina.

In the logs (of travelers such as Ulrich Schmidl) and in the historical records of the colonial era, it appears in several paragraphs that the Cario-Guarani (a tribe that inhabited the Asunción area) prepared cakes and breads based on cassava, corn, and sweet corn mixed with animal fat, known as "mbujapé" ("bread" in Guarani language). The Cario-Guarani diet was complemented with European foods that the Spaniards brought from the old continent. This was due to the introduction of cattle in 1556 in Asunción, so thanks to these animals the new ingredients were finally obtained such as beef, milk, eggs, cheese, etc. In this way, the meals derived from the Cario-Guarani gastronomic base (corn, cassava, pumpkin, sweet potato, etc.) were finally mixed with the ingredients brought by the Spaniards (meat, milk, cheese, eggs, etc.). This union gave rise to foods that have been consumed from the colonial era to the present. In this context, the recipe for typical Paraguayan dishes actually originated, which has cassava, corn, sweet corn, Paraguay cheese, milk and beef as their base ingredients.

== Variants ==
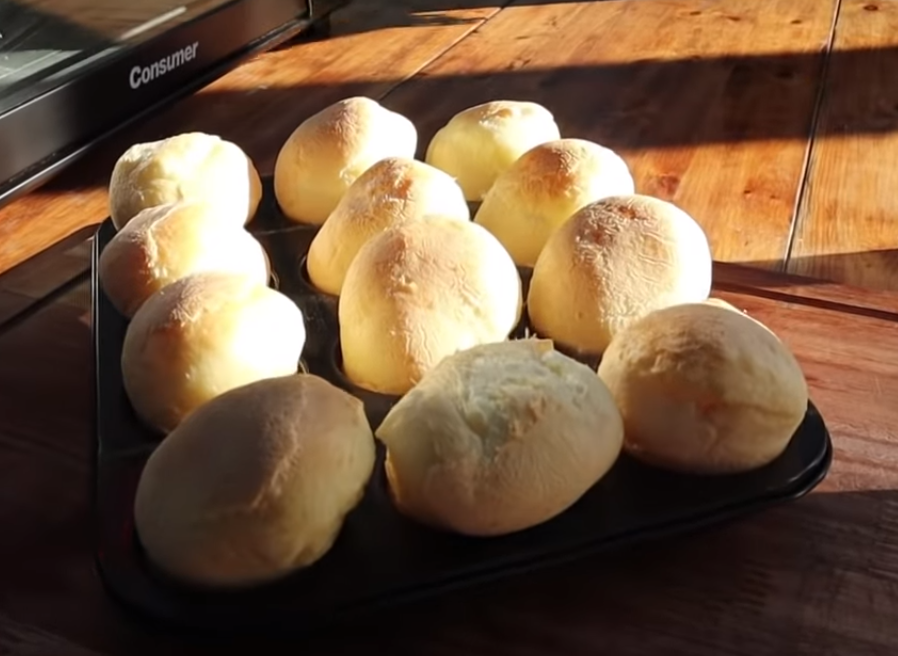
Chipa instantáneo

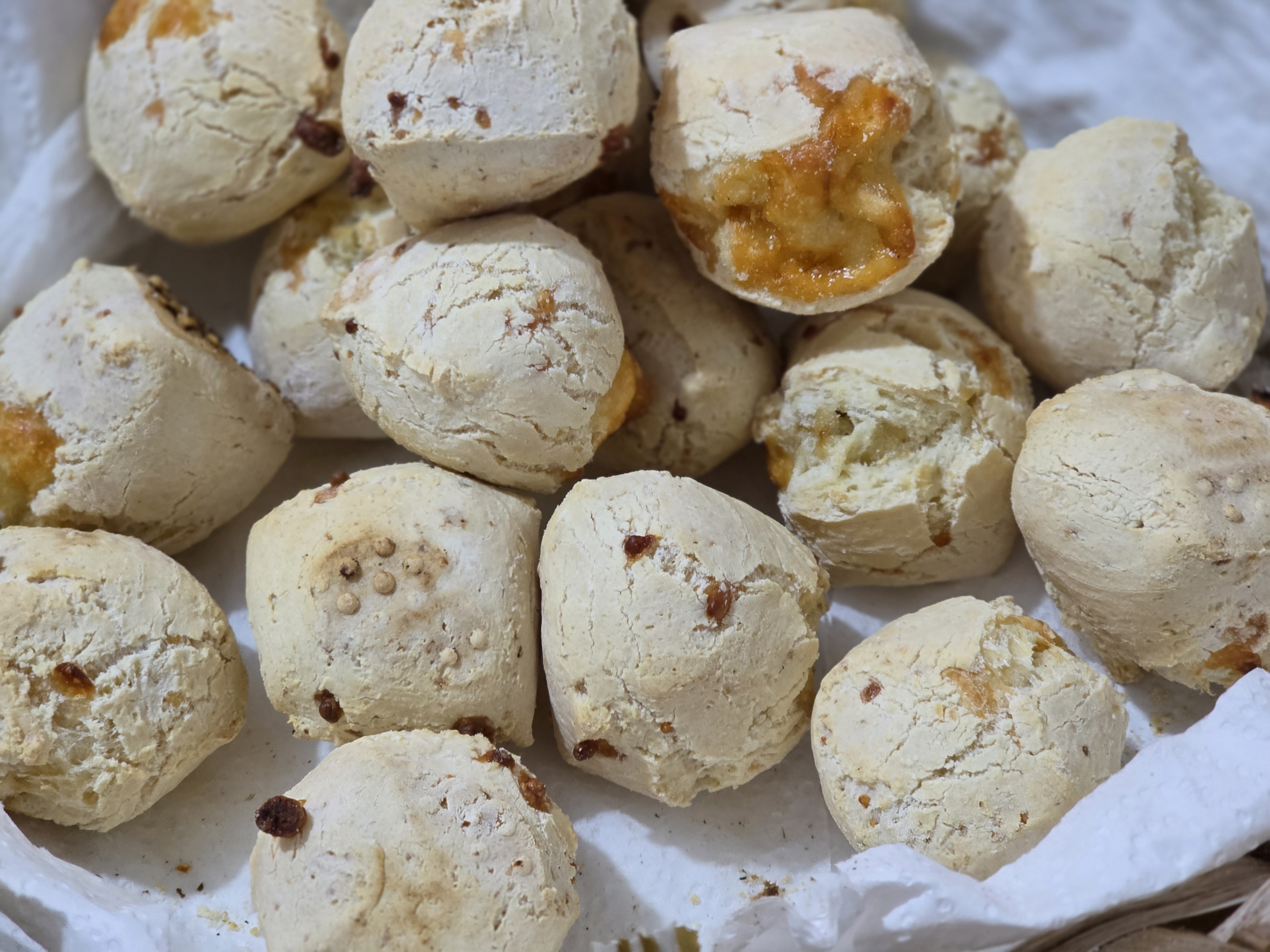
Chipitas

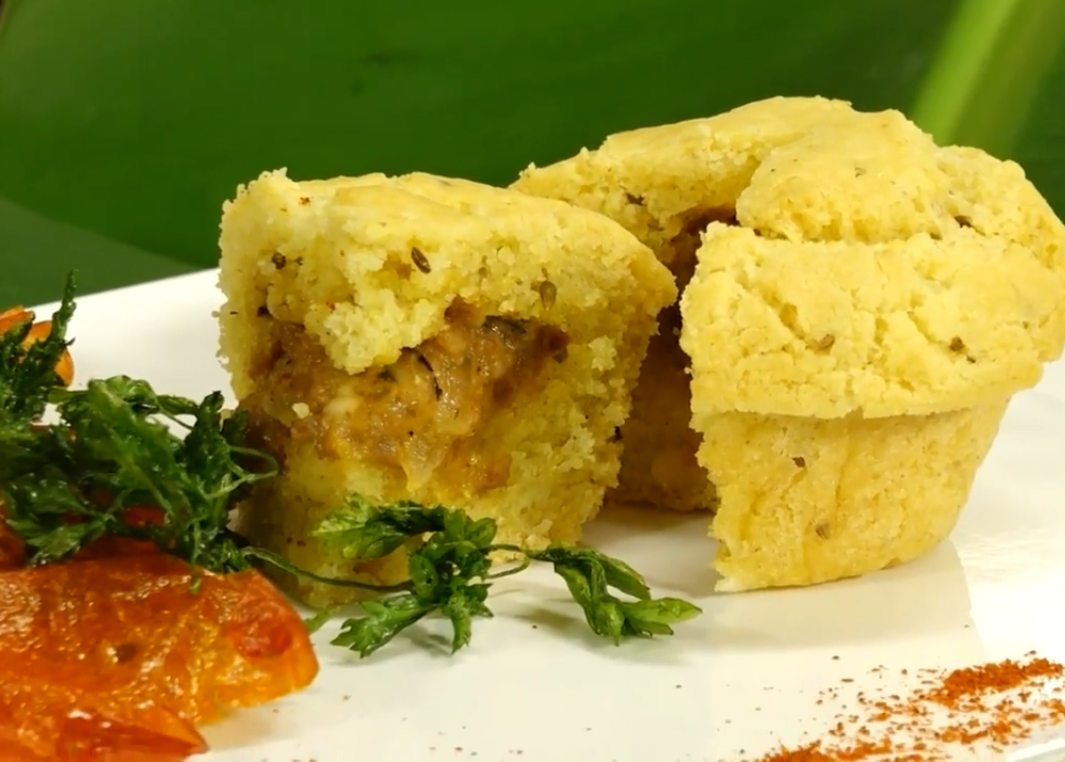
Chipa chutita

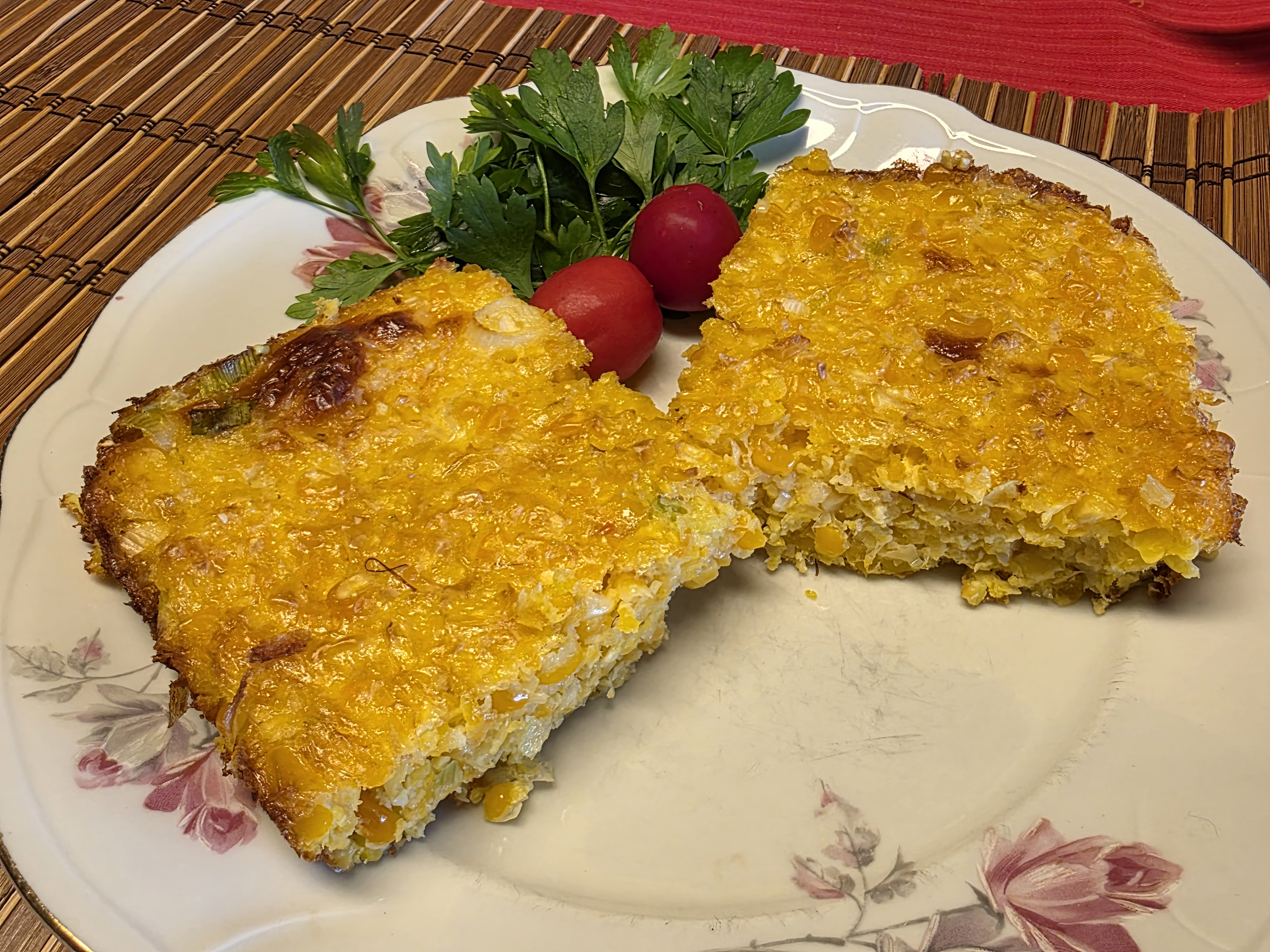
Chipa guasu

Over the centuries, the name "chipa" has been applied to the different side dishes that evolved with the Cario-Guaraní and Spanish transculturation, added to modern Paraguayan cuisine. Currently, there are about 70 registered varieties and according to the book "Food and Paraguayan religiosity: Chipa, sacred bread", where a great diversity of chipas is studied and cataloged, there are:

- Chipa aramirõ: the traditional starch chipa, which receives the term "chipa" in a generic and abbreviated way. It is the best known variety and the ingredients it contains are cassava starch, semi-hard cheese or Paraguay cheese, pork fat, margarine or lard, anise liquor or anise grains.
- Chipa mestiza: it is the second most widespread variety in Paraguay. Its name is due to the mixture of corn flour with cassava starch.
- Instant chipa or Quick chipa: it contains most of the traditional ingredients of the aramiró chipa, quickly prepared, with about 30 minutes of preparation. It consists of blending the ingredients evenly and gradually to cook it for 10 minutes at 200 °C.
- Chipa four cheeses: the starchy chipa dough is filled with different cheeses: Mozzarella, Catupiry, Paraguay Cheese and sandwich cheese.
- Chipa chutita: the mass of the mestizo chipa is complemented with cornstarch and baking powder. It has as a filling the traditional "chorizo misionero", grated cheese, parked Paraguay cheese, onion, red peppers and other seasonings.
- Chipa asador, caburé or mbocá: it is cooked with the heat of embers and around a stick, so it does not have a spongy internal part. They have an elongated shape and a fine and hollow texture, and due to their consistency they can be exposed to the direct heat of a wood or charcoal fire, logically at high temperatures, without burning. As for the denomination, this food is called "chipá caburé" in Misiones, in the northeast of Corrientes and in the Province of Formosa. In turn, in Paraguay it is usually called "chipa asador". The preparation of the chipa mbocá is so well known in that region that Osvaldo Sosa Cordero immortalized its name, mentioning it in his chamamé "Camba cuá".
- Chipa pirú or chipita: it is a small sponge-cake donut no more than two centimeters in diameter, enormously crisp (therein lies the secret of its flavor) and that is used fundamentally to accompany breakfasts and snacks. Popularly, a phrase that is heard frequently when talking about the "chipa pirú" is that "you can't stop eating them". Pirú means skinny, fine, thin or skinny and that, in this meaning for the donut, is translated as "dry". The piru chipa is the thin and dry chipa, characteristics that define the variety and make it unique in the chipa family.
- Chipa so'o: it is a mass of cassava starch filled with seasoned meat. It has a beef filling, which is why so'o means "meat" in Guarani, hence the name "chipa so'o". For its elaboration, buns the size of a large cookie are formed and hollowed out with the thumb, in order to introduce the filling of meat and chopped egg, so that in its final form it acquires the shape of a cake of approximately 7 centimeters diameter.
- Chipa guasu: it is a corn cake cooked in the oven. Guazú is the Guarani word for 'big', so it means 'the big chipa'. It is made with fresh corn, egg, water, salt, milk, fat (butter or oil), fresh cheese or Paraguayan cheese. It is one of the usual dishes during Lent and Easter as it does not contain meat. Its preparation can be salty or slightly sweet, or with a meat filling. Its name is due to the conjunction of two words. "Chipa" generically designates a set of different types of cakes that have corn or cassava starch as a preparation base and that are part of the so-called "tyra", a Guarani term that is used to designate any food that is consumed to accompany the mate cocido, milk or coffee. While "guazú" means 'big', from which it is inferred that the "chipa guasú" is, to some extent, 'big corn cake'.
- Chipa quezú: it is made with fresh cheese, preferably goat cheese, where quesú is the Guarani deformation of the Spanish word 'cheese'.
- Chipa jasmine: it is made with 3/4 cassava starch and 1/4 wheat flour, Paraguay cheese, grated cheese, pork fat, eggs and other ingredients. It is the least heavy variety since it does not carry the load of all the cassava starch.
- Chipa manduví: manduví means "peanut" in Guarani, and is made with a mixture of cornmeal and ground peanuts.
- Chipa rorá: it is made from the husk of the corn seed after it has been strained.

== See also ==
- Cheese bun
- Pão de queijo
- Mbeju
- Almojábana
- Pandebono
- Pan de queso
- Pan de yuca
