= Cheese bun =

The phrase cheese bun may refer to various small baked cheese-flavored rolls.

Cheese bun or cheesebread may also refer to:

- Almojábana, a cheese bread found in Latin America
- Chipa, a Paraguayan cheese bread
- Chipá, an Argentinian cheese bread
- Cuñapé, a Bolivian cheese bread
- Gougère, a French cheese bread
- Hot and spicy cheese bread, a cheese bread from Wisconsin
- Khachapuri, a Georgian cheese bread
- Pandebono, a Colombian cheese bread
- Pan de queso, a Colombian cheese bread
- Pan de yuca, a Colombian and Ecuadorian cheese bread
- Pão de queijo, a Brazilian cheese bread
