= Culture of Paraguay =

The Coat of Arms of Paraguay

The culture of Paraguay reflects the Spanish and indigenous influences of the country. Paraguay's cultural heritage can be traced to the extensive intermarriage between the original male Spanish settlers and indigenous Guaraní women. Modern historians, however, characterise this process as one shaped largely by sexual and economic coercion rather than voluntary union, rooted in the colonial practices of the cuñadazgo and the rancheadas. Their culture is highly influenced by various European countries, including Spain. Therefore, Paraguayan culture is a fusion of two cultures and traditions; one European, the other, Southern Guaraní. More than 93% of Paraguayans are mestizos, making Paraguay one of the most homogeneous countries in Latin America. A characteristic of this cultural fusion is the extensive bilingualism present to this day: more than 80% of Paraguayans speak both Spanish and the indigenous language, Guaraní. Jopara, a mixture of Guaraní and Spanish, is also widely spoken.

This cultural fusion is expressed in arts such as embroidery (ao po'í) and lace making (ñandutí). The music of Paraguay, which consists of lilting polkas, bouncy galopas, and languid guaranias is played on the native harp. Paraguay's culinary heritage is also deeply influenced by this cultural fusion. Several popular dishes contain manioc, a local staple crop similar to the yuca also known as Cassava root found in the Southwestern United States and Mexico, as well as other indigenous ingredients. A popular dish is sopa paraguaya, similar to a thick corn bread. Another notable food is chipa, a bagel-like bread made from cornmeal, manioc, and cheese. Many other dishes consist of different kinds of cheeses, onions, bell peppers, cottage cheese, cornmeal, milk, seasonings, butter, eggs and fresh corn kernels.

The 1950s and 1960s were the time of the birth of a new generation of Paraguayan novelists and poets such as José Ricardo Mazó, Roque Vallejos, and Nobel Prize nominee Augusto Roa Bastos. Several Paraguayan films have been made.

Inside the family, conservative values predominate. In lower classes, godparents have a special relationship to the family, since usually, they are chosen because of their favorable social position, in order to provide extra security for the children. Particular respect is owed them, in return for which the family can expect protection and patronage.

== Guarani Jesuit Missions ==
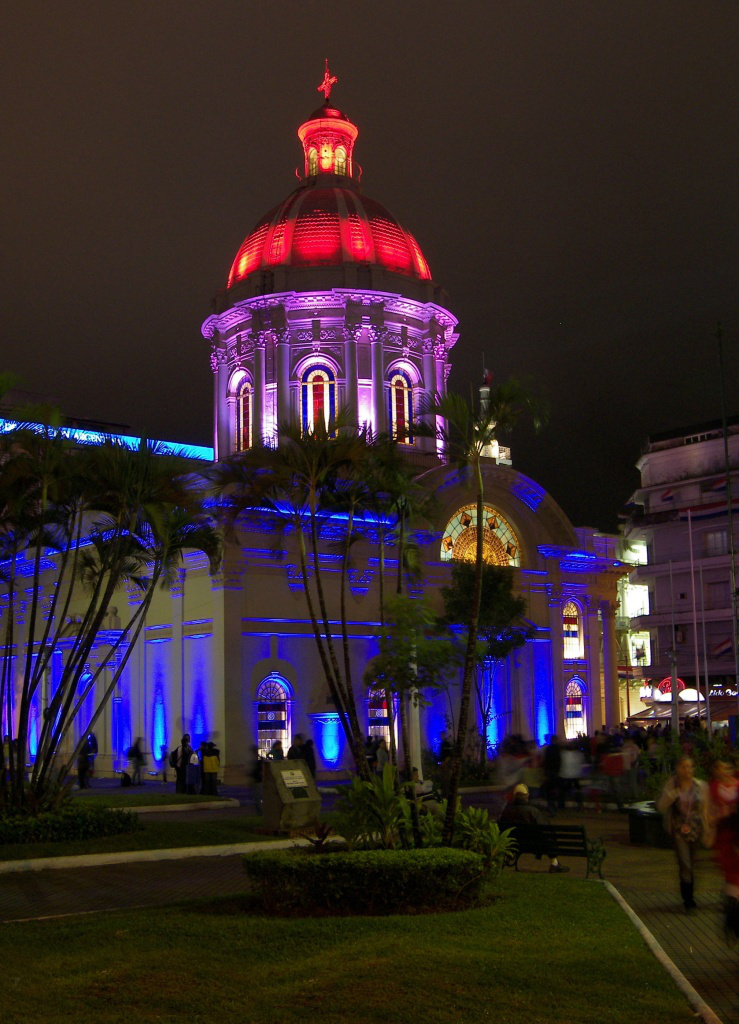
The National Pantheon of the Heroes, in Asunción, Paraguay.

Paraguay was in its maximum extension the old Paraguayan Province, a Jesuit administration belonging to the Viceroyalty of Peru and whose clerical capital was the city of Córdoba. During the 17th and 18th centuries, 30 reductions were built in this province, which are currently distributed in three countries: 8 in Paraguay, 15 in Argentina and 7 in Brazil. In 1609 the first reduction of San Ignacio Guazú was created, and since then, the other towns were rising, subdivided into 23 Western Missions (in southern Paraguay and in the current provinces of Misiones and Corrientes) and the 7 Eastern Missions in southwest Brazil. The Jesuits were expelled in 1768, reason why the towns entered decay and their settlers were in need of migrating to other areas of Paraguay, Misiones and Corrientes. In these places there are still vestiges of its architectural and urban structure.

Since the Spanish-Guaraní syncretism, the Guaraní Jesuit missions laid the foundations for the Guaraní alphabet and literature, Paraguayan cuisine, Paraguayan music and other arts. In terms of literary creation, musical composition, regional gastronomy and the entire amalgam of Paraguayan artistic expressions, the arts learned in the missions continued to evolve along with contributions from other immigrants from the late 19th century and throughout the 20th century. Among the cultural reminiscences transmitted by Jesuits-Guaraníes, both tangible and intangible, are the Paraguayan harp, Paraguayan polka, consumption of yerba mate, starch and corn-based foods such as chipa and Chipa Guasu, the Guaraní language that achieved its status as a regulated language and which is one of the official languages of Paraguay thanks to it.

Two of the eight Paraguayan reductions were declared UNESCO World Heritage Sites. Both towns are in Itapúa Department, in the ruins of Jesús and Trinidad, located about 50 km from the departmental capital Encarnación. The Jesús de Tavarangüé Mission complements the tourist circuit with the projection of a 3D video mapping. The intention is that visitors can connect directly with the history of the creation and development of the 30 towns founded by the Society of Jesus. The 3D mapping recreates the activities and the evangelizing work of Jesuit people and the large history of these missions.

== Philosophy ==
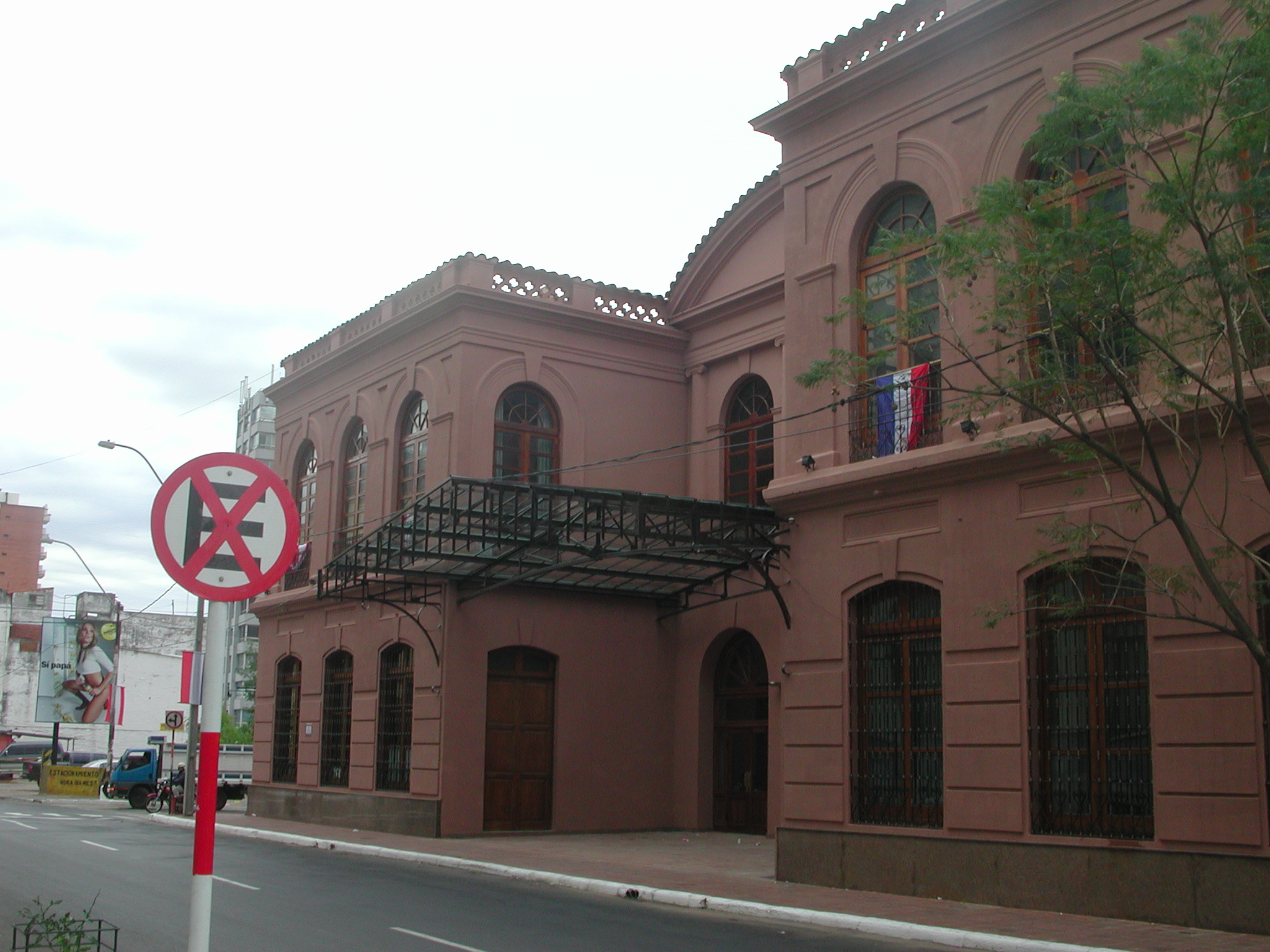
Municipal Theatre Ignacio A. Pane, one of the oldest theaters in the capital, Asunción.

French philosophical theories became popular with Latin American intellectuals as the Spanish Empire was coming to an end. Arturo Ardao mentions that Condillac was held in high regard by the people of Paraguay.

After becoming independent, the new republics founded universities and hired teachers from Europe who spread rationalist ideals.

Among Paraguayan scholars of the early 19th century were the physicians Pedro Cañete and Manuel Talavera.

== Sports ==
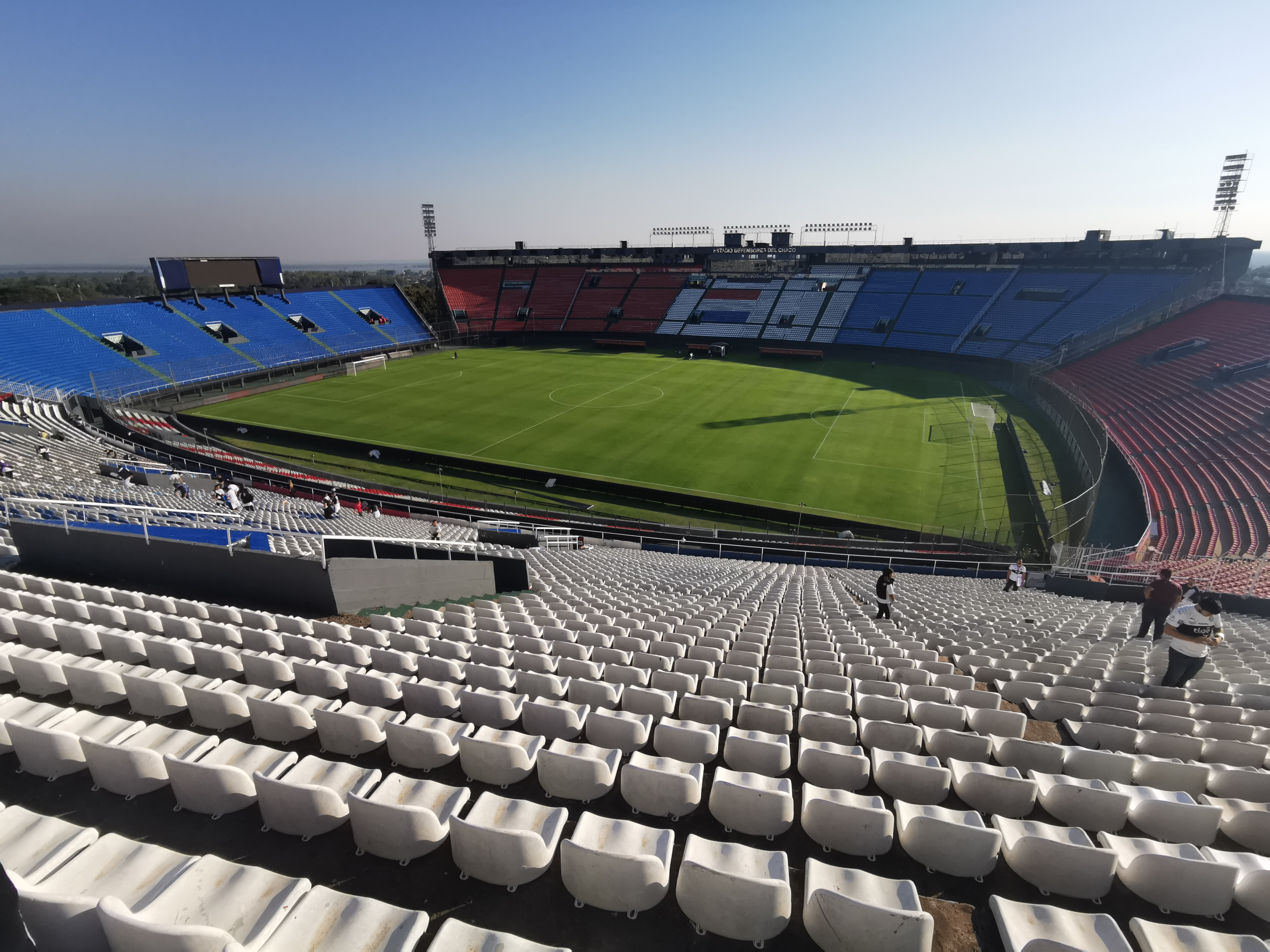
Estadio Defensores del Chaco in Asunción.

Sport in Paraguay is an important part of the country's national culture. Football is the most popular sport, and basketball is also very popular. Other sports such as volleyball, futsal, swimming and tennis are also popular. Additional Paraguayan sports and pastimes include rugby union, chess, motorsport, golf and rowing.

== See also ==
- Music of Paraguay
- Cinema of Paraguay
- Paraguayan cuisine
- List of Paraguayans
- Paraguayan Spanish

== Bibliography ==
- La Filosofía en el Paraguay. Raúl Amaral (2010).
