= Luis Bordón =

Paraguayan composer

- Born: August 19, 1926; Guarambaré, Central, Paraguay
- Died: April 14, 2006 (aged 79)
- Occupations: Composer; harpist

Luis Bordón (1926-2006) was a Paraguayan composer and interpreter of the Paraguayan harp.

== Early life and career ==
Luis Bordón was born in the city of Guarambaré, Paraguay on August 19, 1926, and from a very early age he showed interest towards the art of musical performance, supported and promoted by his father.

He began his studies with the Paraguayan harp and soon after developed a delicate and particular style which was "impossible to be imitated by anyone," according to comments from people who heard him play.

Since 1950 and for several years he joined the orchestra of Julián Rejala, a Paraguayan folk music band, which conducted tours around the country and then to the neighbouring country of Brazil, highlighting his participation in the group as the leading musician.

Interpreter of the Paraguayan harp, along with his colleagues Félix Pérez Cardozo, Digno García, Albino Quiñónez, Cristino Báez Monges and others. He settled with his art for a long time in Brazil where he developed most of his career, being considered in the decades of the '70s and '80s as an artist of greater success in presentations and record sales throughout Brazil. In the neighboring country, he recorded 34 albums, won 8 gold discs, broadcast compositions for Paraguayan harp and popularized the instrument's repertoire which expanded to all kinds of music.

His compositions have won widespread popularity and are constantly played at various points of the globe. 'Indian Harp" was the name this instrument (harp) received because it was played by several national interpreters. But with the arrival of Luis Bordón, who made other sounds achievements applying innovative techniques, it was renamed to Paraguayan harp.

Bordón dissociated from the band to further improve his technique as a soloist. He entered the field of recording records in 1959, when he produced his first job in LP, called "Paraguayan harp in Hi Fi" (Paraguayan harp in High Fidelity). This material very soon became an international success. The success was such that it led to him launching other discs, successively, adding so far 32 volumes, not taking into account the countless discs recorded on 78 and 45 rotations.

Throughout his career developed in Brazil he recorded about 34 discs of long length, which had spread and reached around the world and lovers of Paraguayan harp have included them in their private collections as high artistic value materials.

His activity as a composer and performer of the Paraguayan harp continued until his last days and recorded 14 more discs, CDs, with works that are important parts of the Paraguayan history of music, specially composed for this unique instrument. The success achieved with their work record has made him creditor of several awards, including eight gold discs.

== Awards ==
He won 18 artistic trophies throughout Brazil and the United States as well as being honored with the degree of "Commentator" by the State Governor of São Paulo, for having met with numerous cultural programmes. In 2001 UNESCO gave him the medal Orbis Guaraniticus, coined in the house of Monagas Paris, specially designed for the personalities of art and culture, plus many other prizes.

His discs were launched at special events held in Brazil, USA, France, Spain, Portugal, Netherlands, Japan, Venezuela Argentina, Mexico, Colombia, and other countries.

He settled for 3 years in the United States, with a special visa granted by the government of that country to whom he demonstrated an extraordinary talent in the field where he flourished. He was special guest of a Japanese airline to make presentations in their country, and in the Netherlands he was specially convened to interpret his Paraguayan harp at the inauguration of a television channel.

He returned to Paraguay and continued composing and interpreting scores for the Paraguayan harp. He made a duet with his son Luis Bordón Junior, who accompanied him with the guitar.

== Death ==
In February 2006, he received a tribute-and at that time he expressed his desire to conduct a large harp concert, but it was cut short when he died on April 14, 2006, at the age of 80.

== Works ==
=== Most popular songs ===
Some of his most popular songs include:

- Despertar nativo.
- Caballito andador.
- Canto de pajarito.
- Danza seductora.
- Lamento indio.
- Arpa paraguaya.
- La voz del viento.
- Leny.
- Sonrisa hechicera.
- La fiesta de la selva.
- El arpa y la danza de mi tierra.
- Anivena upeicha Yoly.
- El diálogo del guyraû con el caballo, varias de ellas con Oscar Safuán.

=== Gold records ===
Some of the albums that gave Luis Bordón eight Gold Records:

- A Harpa e a Cristandade
- Arpa Paraguaya en Hi-Fi
- Recordando carnavales (2 volúmenes)
- Sucesos sanjuaninos
- El arpa paraguaya y la cristiandad
- Bordón tropical
- Tango para ti
- Luís bordón y su arpa paraguaya
- Noches del Paraguay
- Paraguay 80

== Bibliography ==
- Sound of my Earth.
