= Rejala =

Rejala is a surname. Notable people with the surname include:

- Gabriela Rejala (born 1989), Paraguayan beauty pageant contestant
- Julián Rejala (1907–1981), Paraguayan musician
