= Pão de queijo =

Brazilian snack

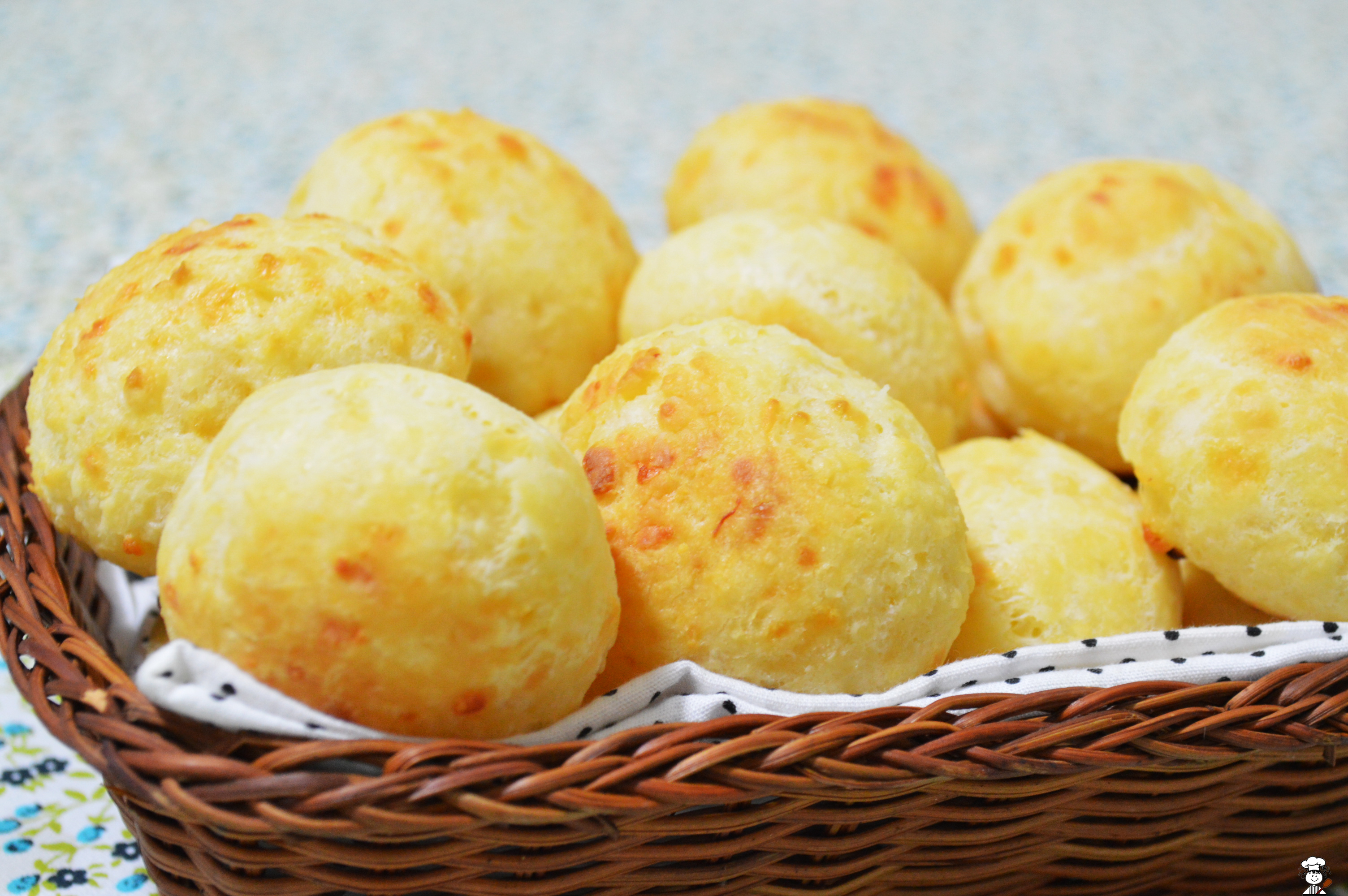
- Type: Bread
- Course: Breakfast or snack
- Place of origin: Brazil
- Region or state: Minas Gerais
- Main ingredients: Sour and sweet tapioca flour, cheese (usually Minas cheese)
- Similar dishes: Gougère, Chipa

Pão de queijo (/ˌpaʊn də ˈkeɪʒu/ POWN-də-KAY-zhoo; Portuguese pronunciation: [ˈpɐ̃w dʒi ˈke(j)ʒu], "cheese bread" in Portuguese) or Brazilian cheese bread is a small, baked cheese roll or cheese ball, a popular snack and breakfast food in Brazil. It is a traditional Brazilian recipe, originating in the state of Minas Gerais.

In Brazil, it is inexpensive and often sold from streetside stands by vendors carrying a heat-preserving container. It is also commonly found in groceries, supermarkets, and bakeries, industrialized or freshly made. The cassava flour is what gives the snack its distinct texture, which is chewy and elastic, being crunchy on the outside.

Most countries in South America have their own versions of this snack; the main difference between them, in general, is the ingredients used in the recipe, which can change slightly, giving different results. In Brazil, traditionally, both sour and sweet cassava flour are used; the Brazilian recipe also excludes some ingredients used in other countries, such as corn starch, all-purpose flour, black pepper, sugar, fennel, and baker's yeast.

== History ==
With the discovery of mines near Ouro Preto in around 1700, some 20% of the Brazilian population at that time, mainly slaves, occupied a vast territory in southeast Brazil. Since wheat was not available, local cooks created a kind of bread from starch derived from the cassava tubers shown to them by Tupiniquins indigenous groups. In the late 19th century, grated hard cheese was added.

== Main ingredients ==
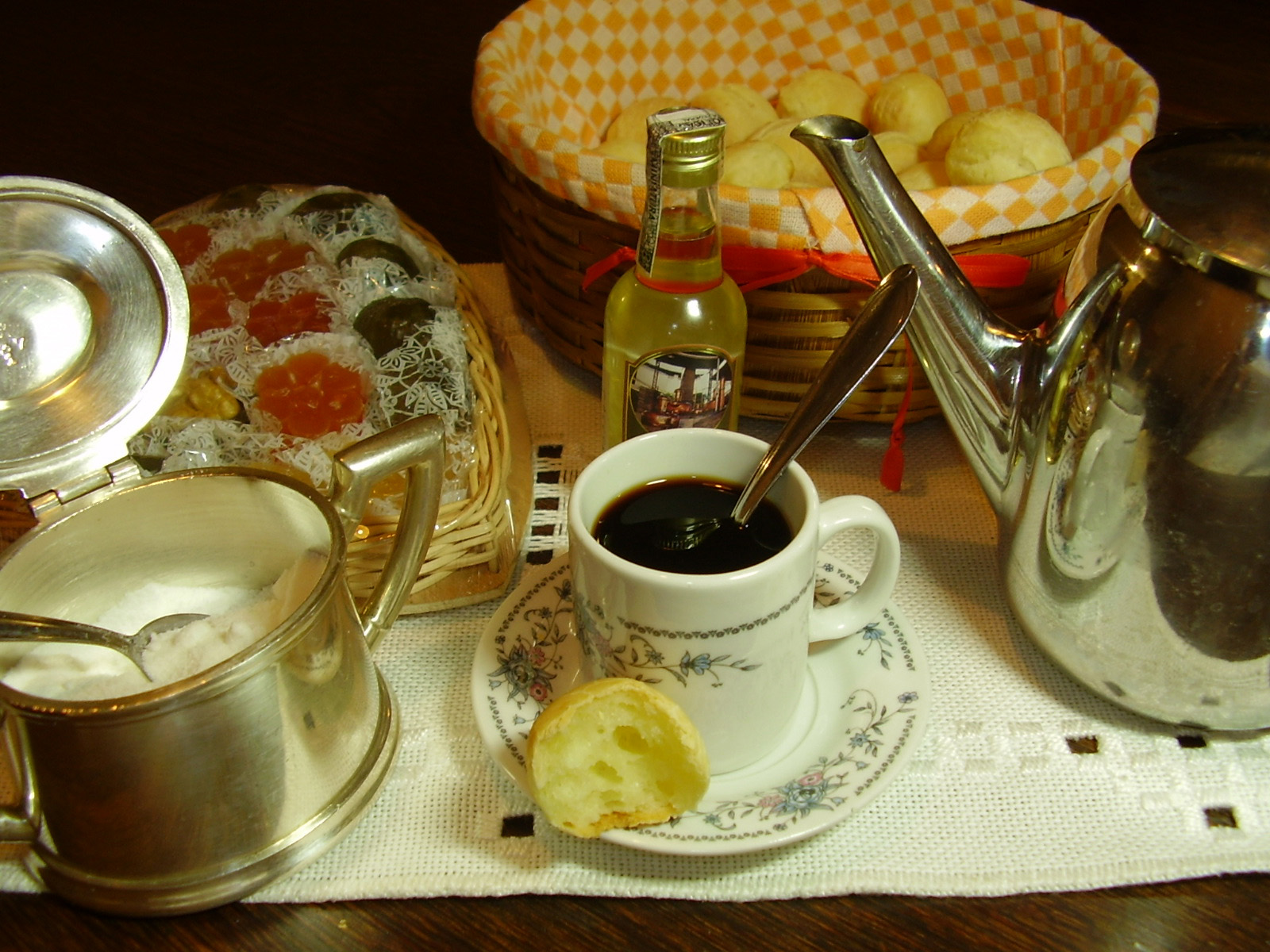
Pão de queijo with coffee and a small cachaça bottle. The half-bitten pão de queijo over the saucer shows the inside.

In Brazil, the most traditional recipe uses both sweet and sour cassava flour, oil, eggs, milk, salt, cheese (Minas, Canastra, Parmesan), and water. Small amounts of margarine or butter can also be included.

The fat in the recipe acts as a molecular lubricant. The egg gives colour and flavour to the recipe, contributing to the elastic texture of the dough.

The type of cheese varies according to preference or availability. The most used are mozzarella, parmesan, and minas or canastra cheese (either in its "ripened" or "standard" version). The cheese gives the typical flavor of the cheese bread, hence its name.

There is also the boiled cheese bread with a preparation technique that requires boiling water while preparing, sometimes mixed with vegetable oil in flour. The boiled cheese bread has the closest taste of natural flavor, as in the boiling process the dough is pre-cooked.

Some recipes use potato.

== Preparation ==
Pães de queijo are formed into small balls, around 3–5 centimeters (1.2–2.0 in) in diameter (though they may be larger) and about 50 calories in each roll. The cassava flour is a powerful starch which is key to the texture of the pão de queijo; unlike other types of bread, pão de queijo is not leavened. Small pockets of air within the dough expand during baking and are contained by the elasticity of the starch paste. Because it is made of cassava flour (as opposed to wheat flour), pão de queijo contains no gluten. Varieties of stuffed pães de queijo with catupiry, requeijão, hot and melted goiabada, doce de leite, bacon and other variations can be found in Brazil.

== Availability and variations ==
=== Brazil ===
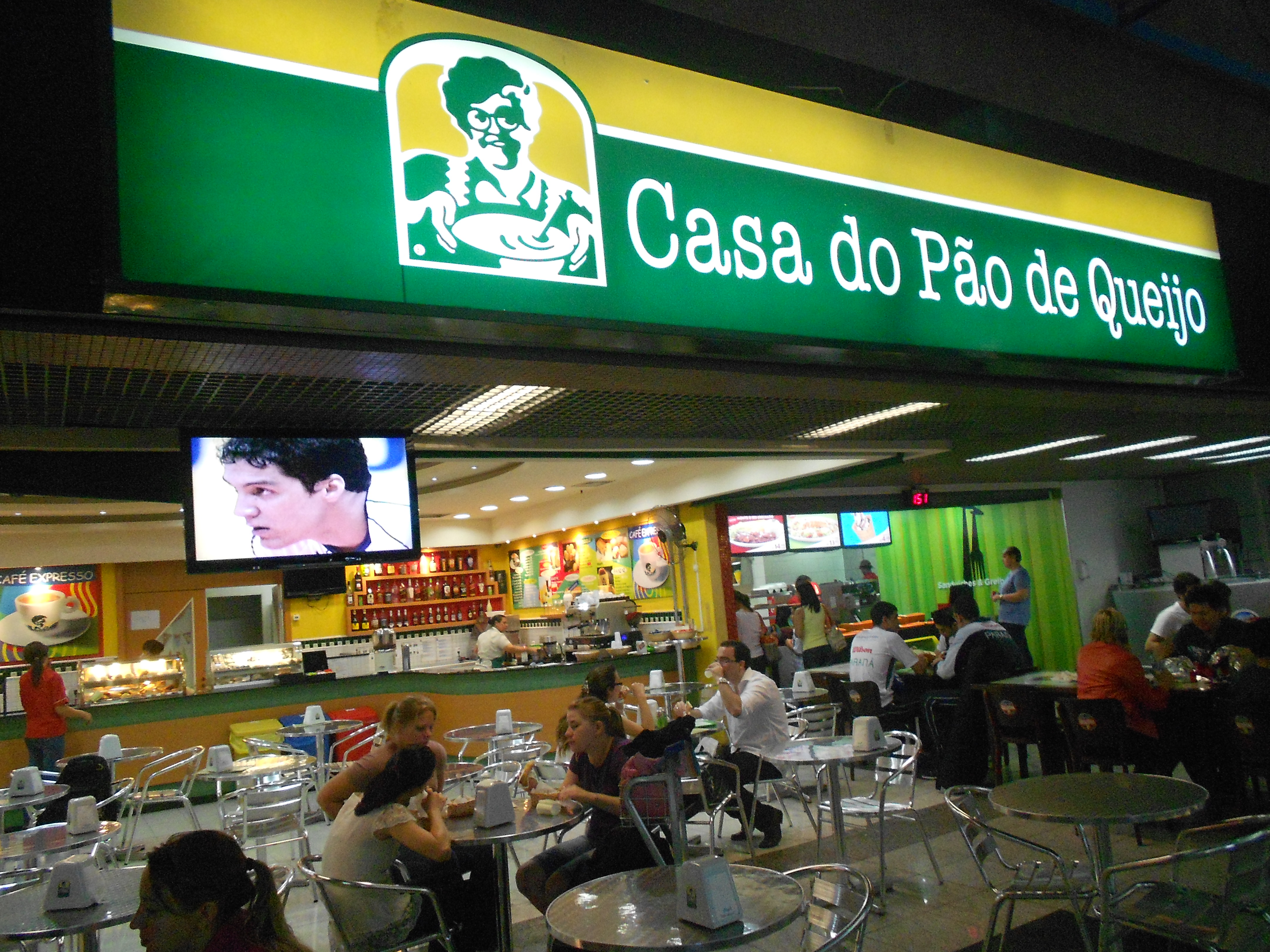
Casa do Pão de Queijo at the Afonso Pena International Airport, in São José dos Pinhais, Paraná, Brazil

In Brazil, pão de queijo is a popular breakfast dish and snack. It continues to be widely sold at snack bars and bakeries, and it can also be bought frozen to bake at home. In Brazil, cheese puff mix packages are easily found in most supermarkets.

=== Wider South America ===
Cuñapé, chipá, pandebono, pan de yuca and pan de queso are similar to pão de queijo and can be found in northern Argentina, Bolivia, Colombia, Ecuador, Paraguay and Uruguay.

=== Japan / East Asia ===
Pão de queijo arrived in Japan with the dekasegi. Often compared to mochi, it is usually made with rice flour instead of cassava (tapioca) starch. It also inspired the popular donut chain Mister Donut in its creation of Pon de Ring, which has since popularized the concept of mochi donut.

=== Anglosphere ===
Pão de queijo is also commercially available in Australia and the United States, in part due to its popularity in the gluten-free movement.

== See also ==
- Buñuelos (fried dough buns consumed in Latin America and Spain)
- Pan de queso (from Colombia)
- Cheese bun (includes list of those popular in South America)
- Gougère (from France)
- Chipa (from Paraguay)
