= Parva (food) =

Bread

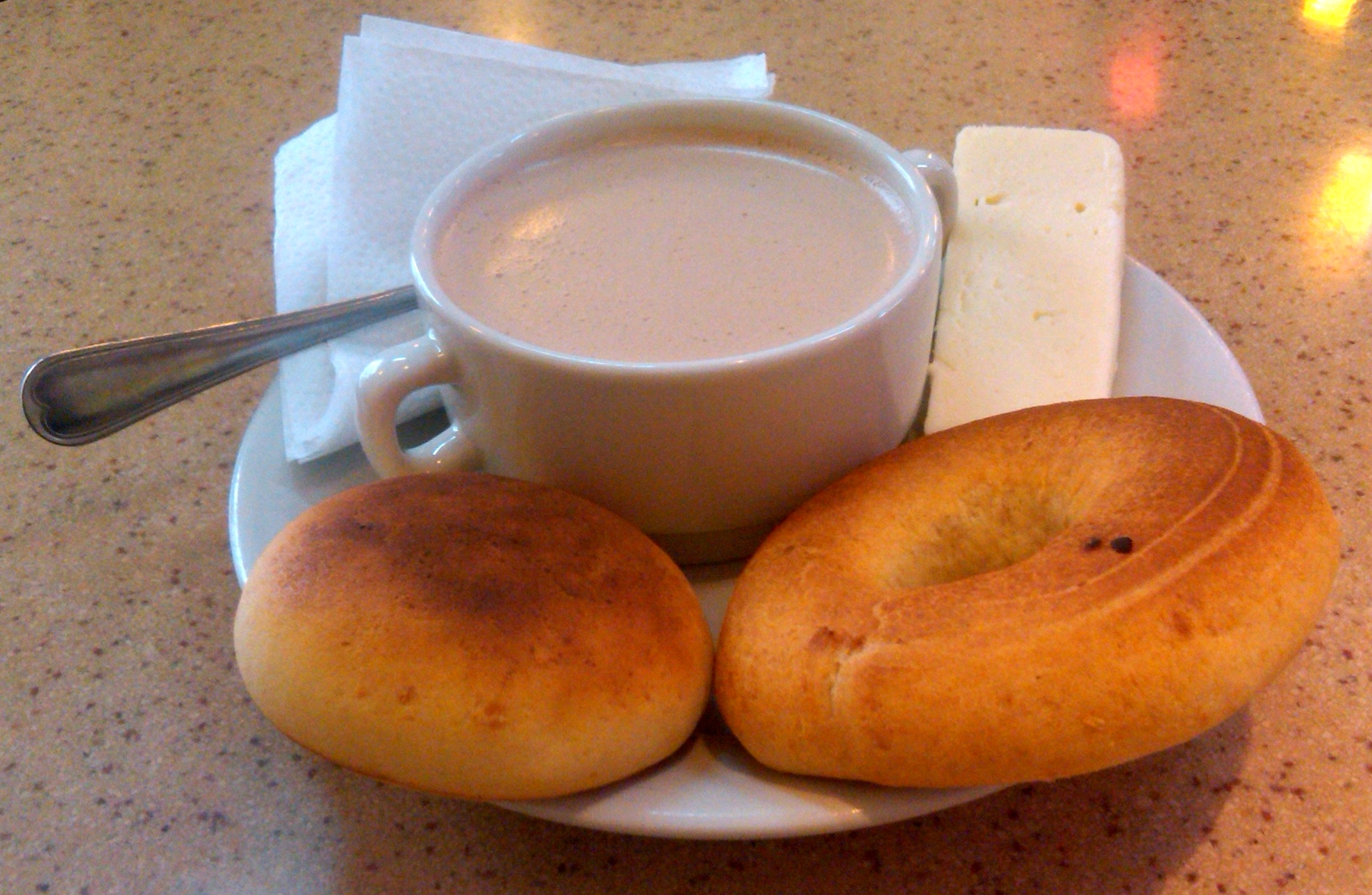
Almojábana (left) and pan de queso (right) are common examples of parva.

In the Paisa region of Colombia, parva refers to a wide variety of small baked goods and sweets that are used as quick snacks or morning meals, and are either sweet or savory. This type of food is usually accompanied with coffee, hot chocolate, or sweeter drinks like aguapanela. Examples of more savory parva foods include pan de queso, pandeyuca, buñuelos, and croissants. Sweet examples of parva include red roll cake filled with guava (Spanish: rollo rojo), mojicones, roscones, meringue, tambourine, and cucas.

== History ==
This name for this kind of food comes from the Yiddish "parve" which denotes foods that are neither meat nor dairy, which is used in the same way in Argentina and Latin American regions populated by Sephardis since 1492. It refers to cookies and fresh meals made in the afternoon quickly with flour, such as chips and sweet pies. With the distribution of such foods, the term in known in other regions outside of Antioquia, Colombia.

== See also ==
- Arepa
