= Parva =

Parva may refer to:

- PARVA, a gene
- The 18 parvas, books or chapters of the Mahabharata
- Parva (band), name of English band Kaiser Chiefs from 2000 to 2003
- Parva (film), a Kannada language film by Sunil Kumar Desai
- Parva (food), a class of Colombian baked goods
- Parva (novel), a 1979 novel by S.L Bhyrappa
- Parva, a crustacean larval form, found in shrimp
- La Parva, a town and ski resort near Santiago, Chile
- Parva, Bistrița-Năsăud (Hungarian: Párva), a commune in Bistriţa-Năsăud County, Romania

== Place names in England ==
There are several locations where one settlement is named "Magna" and another nearby "Parva". In this context, magna and parva are the Latin terms for "great" and "little" respectively. Examples include Appleby Magna and Appleby Parva in Leicestershire, Ash Magna and Ash Parva in Shropshire, and Dalton Magna and Dalton Parva in South Yorkshire.

== See also ==
- Pareve, sometimes pronounced parva, classification of food in the laws of kashrut
