= Sopa paraguaya =

Traditional food in Paraguayan cuisine

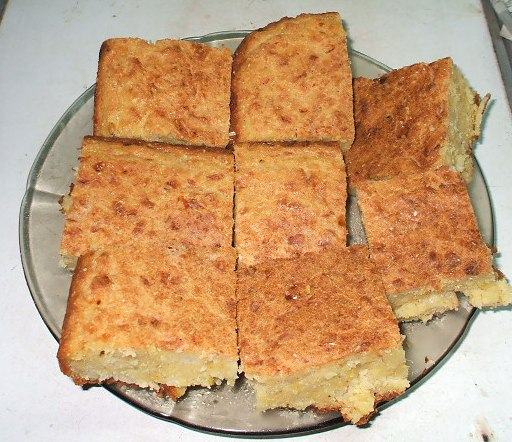
- Type: Bread
- Course: Breakfast or snack
- Place of origin: Paraguay
- Main ingredients: Corn flour, Paraguay cheese, egg, milk, onion.
- Variations: Sopa so'o, sopa ryguasú

Sopa paraguaya (Spanish for 'Paraguayan soup') is a traditional food in Paraguayan cuisine similar to corn bread, spongy and soft. Corn flour, cheese, onion and milk or whey are common ingredients. It is a cake rich in caloric and protein content.

Sopa is similar to another corn-based Paraguayan typical dish, chipa guasu, except that chipa guasu is made with fresh corn and its consistency is closer to a cheesy soufflé and less like a savory cornbread.

== History ==
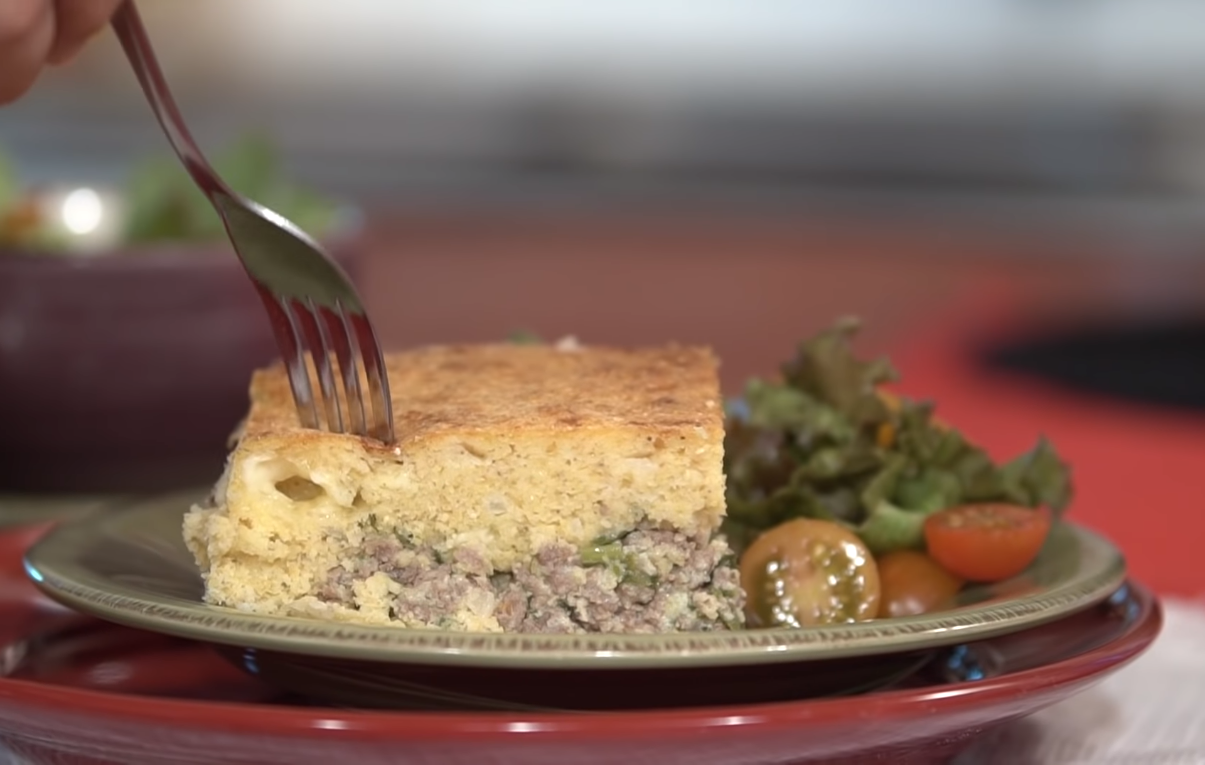
Sopa so'o, with ground beef.

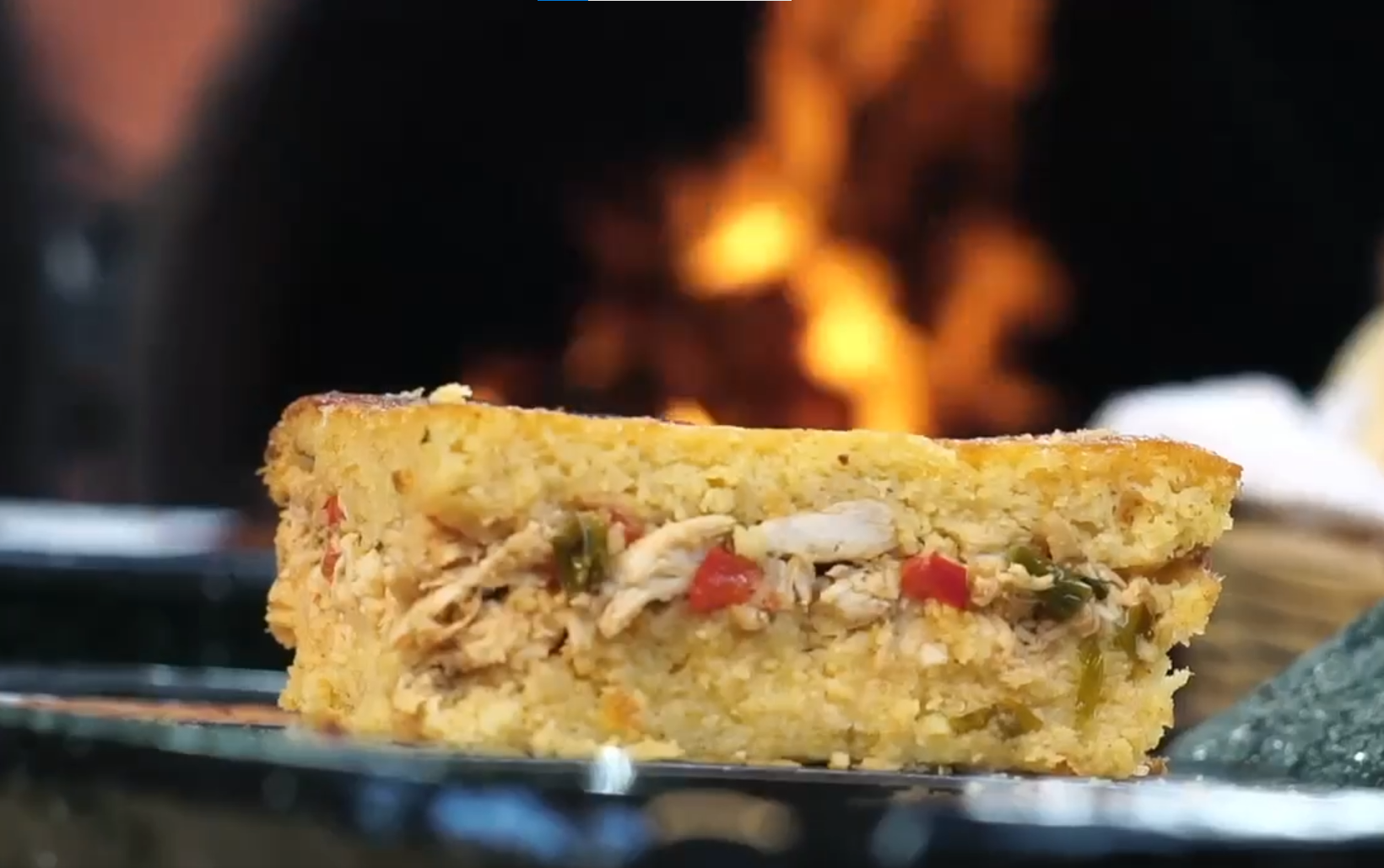
Sopa ryguasu, with chicken.

Some revisionist historians point out that, during the colonial era, the German traveler Ulrich Schmidl was already talking about the recipe for that kind of starchy bread made by the Cario-Guarani people (a native tribe who used to live in Asunción). Schmidl was in charge of noting in the logbook of the Spanish ship in which the expedition led by Juan de Ayolas arrived, which would arrive in Asunción later, thus giving rise to the first encounter between Spaniards and the Cario-Guarani people. Back then, there was a menu that was already part of the varieties of bread that the Cario-Guarani natives had in the early days of the conquest. The food the Cario-Guarani people used to eat was mbujape, which translated from Guarani means “bread”. To cook the mbujapé, corn flour or cassava starch was combined with animal fat and then it was wrapped in a banana leaf and placed in the tanimbú to cook it.

There is the wrong idea of naming Paraguayan cuisine as "Guarani cuisine". Paraguayan gastronomy was born from the fusion of Spanish cuisine and Cario-Guaraní cuisine, which was developed due to the influence of the Franciscan priests, the Spanish conquerors and the mestizos asuncenos, which took place in Asunción and its surroundings. Towns such as Tobatí, Atyrá, Altos, Areguá, Ypané, Guarambaré, Itá and Yaguarón are living examples of how Paraguayan culture developed outside and far from the mercantile influence of the Jesuits. When the Jesuits were expelled in 1767, the natives returned to their natural habitat (the Atlantic jungle) and they never go to Asunción and its area of influence to educate or teach, proof of this is the extinction of Jesuit ceramics and not the Franciscan that is still alive in Itá, Areguá and Tobatí.

The root cuisine of the Cario-Guarani consisted of hunting, fishing, grain crops, cooking techniques and methods, as well as the utensils they made. The first antecedents of Spanish and Cario-Guaraní syncretism took place at the time of the foundation of Asunción and surroundings, where the Franciscan reductions of Altos, Atyrá, Guarambaré, Itá, etc. were later founded. In the Governorate of Paraguay, a Catholic jurisdiction called "Paraguaria Province" was circumscribed. This province, dependent on the Viceroyalty of Peru, covered the regions of Paraguay, Argentina, Uruguay, and parts of Bolivia, Brazil and Chile (between 1604 and 1617). Since 1617, the Paraguaria Province was dismembered to the Governorate of the Río de la Plata and the Governorate of Paraguay, thus remaining under the jurisdiction of the latter. Then this region became part of the ephemeral Viceroyalty of the Río de la Plata (1776-1810). The culture developed in Greater Paraguay was very strong since the Guarani people were used by the conquerors and evangelizers as intermediaries with other Amerindian civilizations. For these reasons, the Paraguayan culture that characterizes Asunción remained strong in this area, and in turn spread to areas where the cattle were later introduced, with the founding of Corrientes in 1588, the oldest city in the northeast of Argentina.

In the logs (of travelers such as Ulrich Schmidl) and in the historical records of the colonial era, it appears in several paragraphs that the Cario-Guarani (a tribe that inhabited the Asunción area) prepared cakes and breads based on cassava, corn, and sweet corn mixed with animal fat, known as "mbujapé" ("bread" in Guarani language). The Cario-Guarani diet was complemented with European foods that the Spaniards brought from the old continent. This was due to the introduction of cattle in 1556 in Asunción, so thanks to these animals the new ingredients were finally obtained such as beef, milk, eggs, cheese, etc. In this way, the meals derived from the Cario-Guarani gastronomic base (corn, cassava, pumpkin, sweet potato, etc.) were finally mixed with the ingredients brought by the Spaniards (meat, milk, cheese, eggs, etc.). This union gave rise to foods that have been consumed from the colonial era to the present. In this context, the recipe for typical Paraguayan dishes actually originated, which has cassava, corn, sweet corn, Paraguay cheese, milk and beef as their base ingredients.

== Ingredients ==
Traditional Sopa Paraguayan includes ingredients such as onion, water, coarse salt, pork fat, eggs, fresh cheese, corn flour, curd or fresh milk, and milk cream.

Other varieties, such as "Sopa Paraguayan de estancia" use almost the same ingredients, only varying the quantities so as to vary the consistency and make the dish more or less greasy, according to taste.

== Bibliography ==
- Asunción 1537: Madre de la gastronomía del Río de la Plata y de Matto Grosso do Sul. Vidal Domínguez Díaz (2017).
- Poytáva: Origen y Evolución de la Gastronomía Paraguaya. Graciela Martínez (2017).
- Tembi’u Paraguay. Josefina Velilla de Aquino (2014).
