= Oscar Safuán =

- Born: Oscar Nelson Safuán; 21 September 1943; San Estanislao, Paraguay
- Died: 28 May 2007 (aged 63) Rio Grande do Sul, Brazil
- Genre: Paraguayan Folk Music
- Occupations: Singer, songwriter

Oscar Nelson Safuán (21 September 1943 – 28 May 2007) was a Lebanese-Paraguayan composer. He was the creator and developer of the music genre called Avanzada.

== Career ==
His first musical trio had the name of "Los Hijos del Paraguay" ("The Children of Paraguay"). Towards the end of 1962, the group left to Foz do Iguaçu, Brazil. Once located there, they started a series of presentations at some of the local restaurants, which allowed them to cover their daily expenses.

From Foz do Iguaçu, they went to Curitiba, capital of the Paraná state. With an improvised album, made of eight pictures taken at a nearby lab in the bus terminal, they left to look for a job in the big city. They mainly looked at restaurants and barbecue places, so as to get at least a good meal each day. They also went to newspapers, radio stations, and the only TV channel of Curitiba at that time. It was there that they finally made a series of presentations for a program directed by Kat Maia, a TV program presenter. By then, the group's name was "The Three Suns" and besides Safuán (who was the third voice of the group) was also Dario Duarte, (second voice, guitar and second requintist) and Antonio Gill (first voice and maracas).

Safuán eventually established himself in São Paulo. There, the group made contact with other Paraguayan artists who were living in that city, such the case of Luis Bordón, Papi Galan and Americo Pereira, the latter with whom Safuán studied theory. He also studied with Rufo Herrera and Luis Pecora. At the same time, he dedicated himself to making musical arrangements at disco houses and to the presentations of the group.

Later, he continued studying with different masters. Safuán founded a music school, "Los Amigos", where he taught other Paraguayans to read music. He was questioned by the evolution of the folk music of his country, and in 1974 he started a research on it, and elaborated the basis for a projection proposal, developing rhythmic combinations as well as melodic ones, in base of the fusion of the guarania and the Paraguayan polka. In 1977 he presented in Asunción his new rhythm named Avanzada, applied to his first composition: "Tema Paraguayo". This musical innovation was supported by important people of the Paraguayan musical sphere, among them, Mauricio Cardozo Ocampo, but the Avanzada had also people against it.

== Death ==
He died in Santa Maria, Rio Grande do Sul, Brazil, on 28 May 2007, from lung cancer.

== Style ==
According to Safuán, "[the Avanzada] is neither polka nor guarania. It is anew rhythm generated by both, and as the child, has a life and a light of his own."

In this musical style, Safuán incorporated, besides folk rhythms, electronic instruments, and influences from popular Brazilian music such as bossa nova and ballade.

== Works ==
Year	Works
1975	Tema paraguayo; Avanzada.
1978/1979	Credo
1980	Badí badá; Paraguay 80; Nacionales 1
1980/1983	Nacionales 2; Nacionales 3
1984	Panambí hu
1985	Dos guitarras

== Awards and distinctions ==
Year	Awards
1985	Award given as "Los doce del año". Radio 1º de Marzo. Asunción. Paraguay. Recognition plate. Dúo sertanejo "César e Paulinho". Piracicaba. Brasil.
1992	Honor Mention from Ateneo Paraguayo.
1990/1994	Homage twice at the "Festival del Tapirakai" San Estanislao. Paraguay
1997/1983	Homage by the group "Arte y Amor" for the creation of Avanzada. Autores Paraguayos Asociados (APA). Asunción. Paraguay.
1994	Recognized for the services to the nacional cultureat the Festival del Takuare’e. Vice Ministerio de Educación y Cultura. Guarambaré.Paraguay.
2000	Homage by the Instituto de formación docente Prof. Mercedes Bareiro de Fretes. Luque. Paraguay.
2001	Nacional Music Award 2001. Cámara de Senadores del Congreso Nacional del Paraguay.
2002	Homage at the Festival del Colegio de Paraguayos Ilustres. Capiatá. Paraguay.
2003	Recognition for the services given to the Nacional art Teatro Municipal de San Lorenzo.

== Bibliography ==
- Safuán, Oscar Nelson. En tres tiempos (Memorias). Editorial El Lector. Asunción.
- Szarán, Luis. Diccionario de la Música en el Paraguay. Editorial Szarán la gráfica. 1997. Asunción.
