= Pan de queso =

Colombian pastry

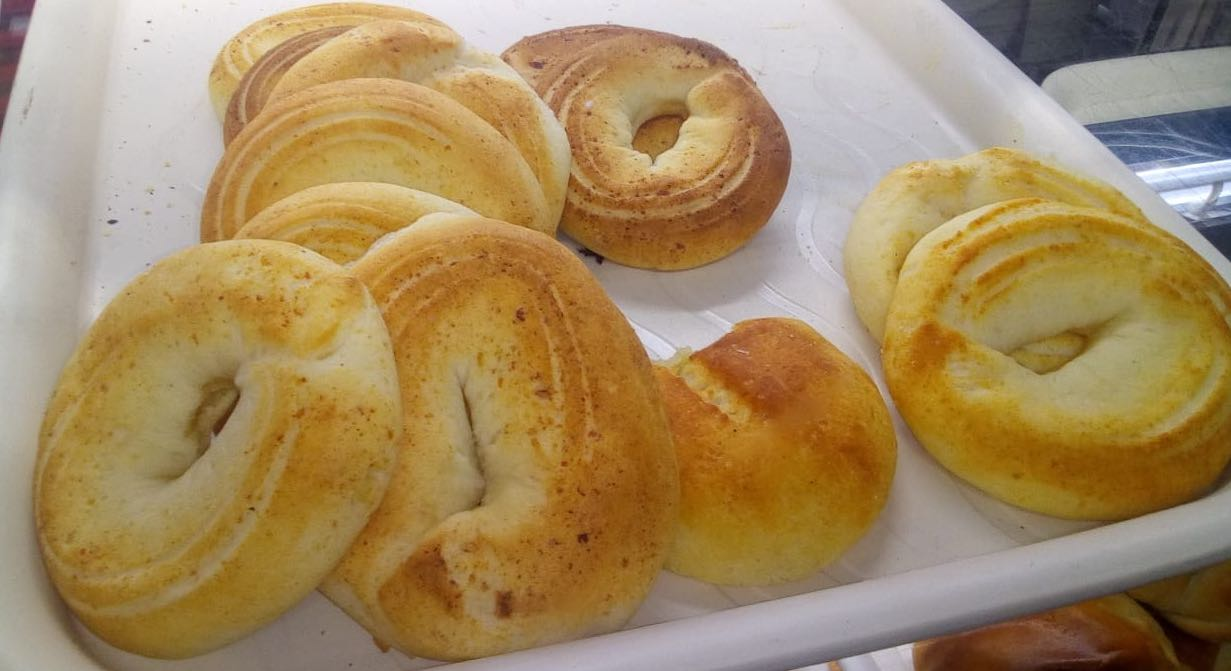
- Pandequesos (rolls) from Antioquia, Colombia
- Type: Bread
- Course: Snack
- Place of origin: Colombia
- Region or state: South America
- Associated cuisine: Colombia
- Serving temperature: Hot or room temperature
- Main ingredients: Tapioca flour and grated cheese

Pan de queso (lit. 'cheese bread') is a traditional Latin American roll made with tapioca flour and grated cheese. It is served plain or filled with cream cheese or jam. This food is especially common in the Paisa region of Colombia as breakfast or parva.

Pan de queso is one of the breads (along with pandebono and buñuelos) that is made with fermented cassava starch. Fermented starch allows biscuits to become light and voluminous.

The food is also prepared in Brazil, known as pão de queijo. Pão de queijo is common in the southeast of Brazil, especially the Minas Gerais region.
