= Pan de yuca =

Type of South American bread

Pandeyuca
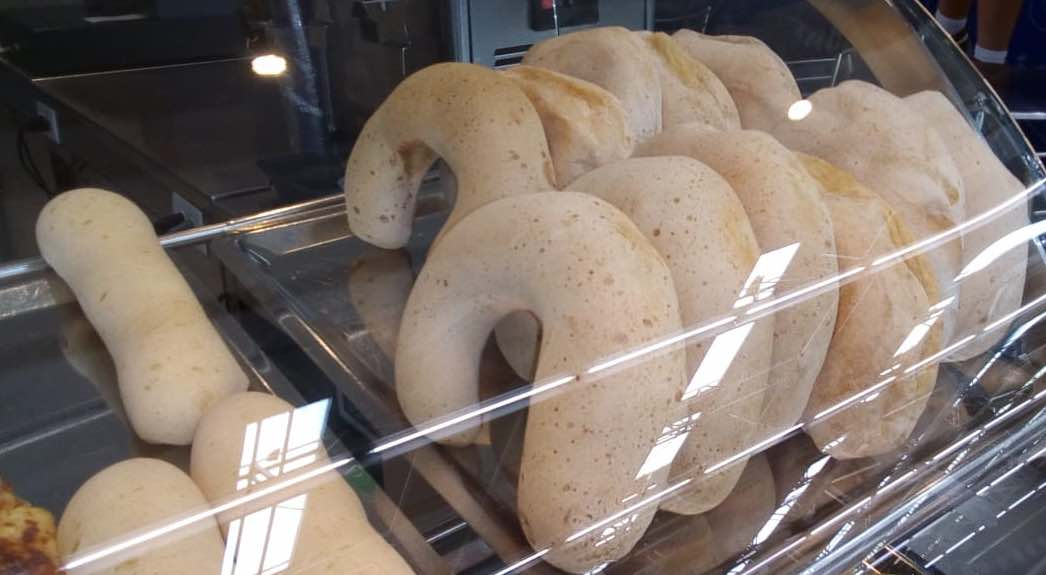
- Pandeyuca or pan de yuca, a bakery item from Colombia and other areas of Latin America.
- Type: Bread
- Place of origin: South America
- Region or state: Latin America
- Associated cuisine: Colombia, Ecuador
- Serving temperature: Hot or room temperature
- Main ingredients: Cassava starch, cheese

Pan de yuca (Spanish for 'cassava bread') is a type of bread made of cassava starch and cheese typical of western Ecuador and southern Colombia.

== History ==
An 1856 watercolor by Manuel María Paz shows cassava bread being prepared by members of the Saliva people in Casanare Province.

== Gallery ==
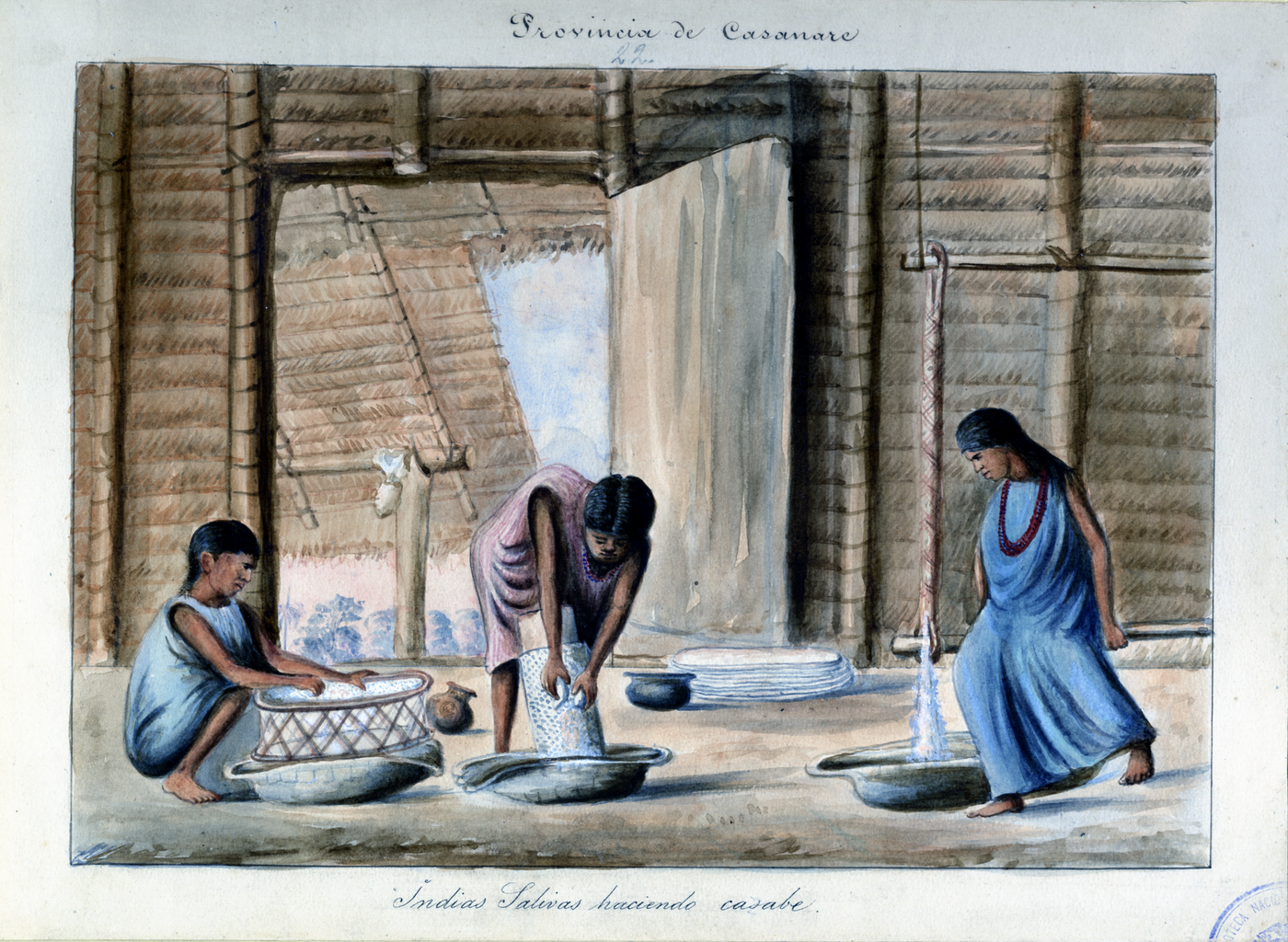
An 1856 watercolor by Manuel María Paz shows cassava bread being prepared by members of the Saliva people in Casanare Province

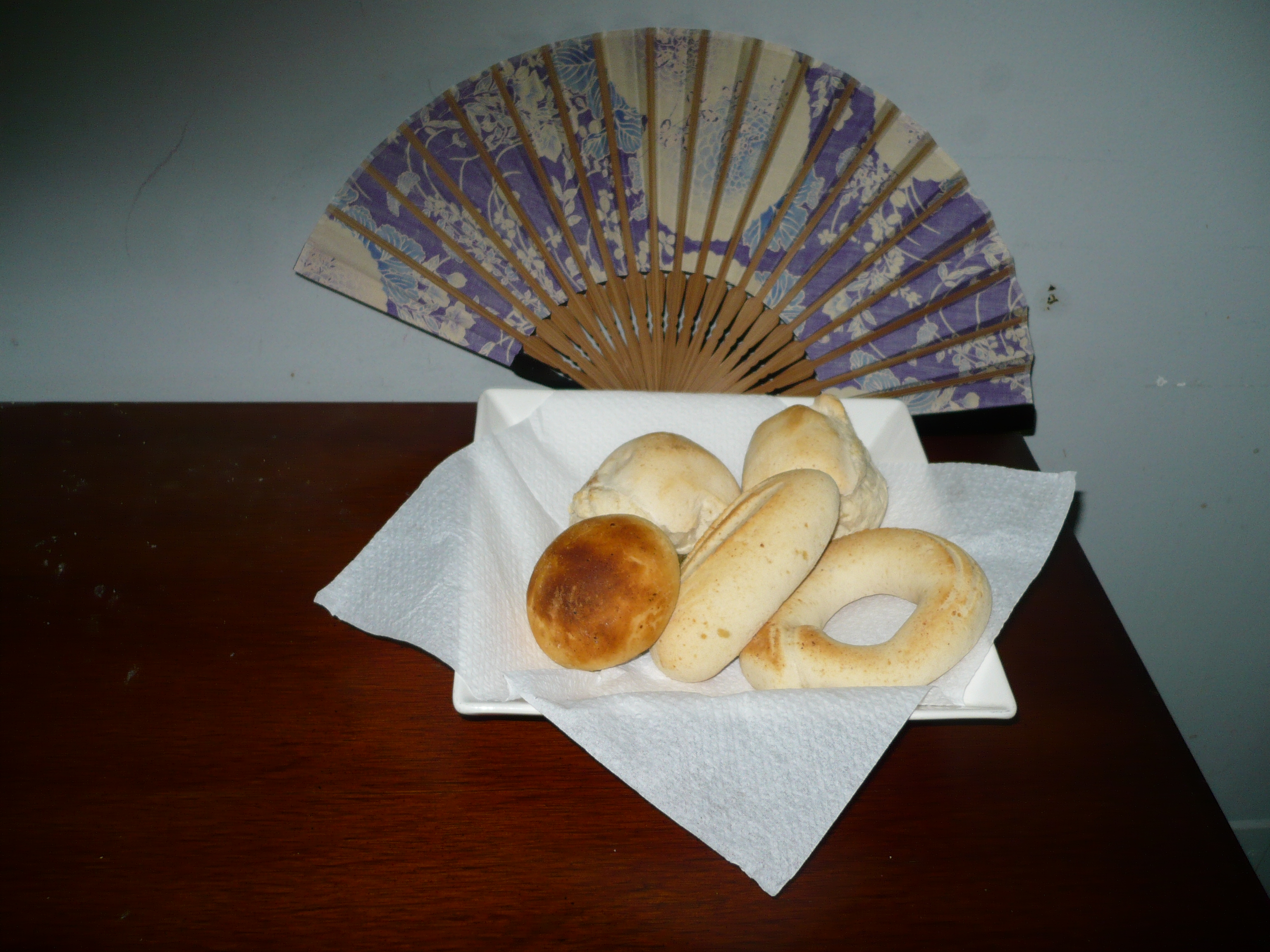
Image containing: in the back two pandeyucas, in front to the right two pandebonos and in front to the left an almojábana.

== See also ==
- Cheese bun
