= Almojábana =

Bread

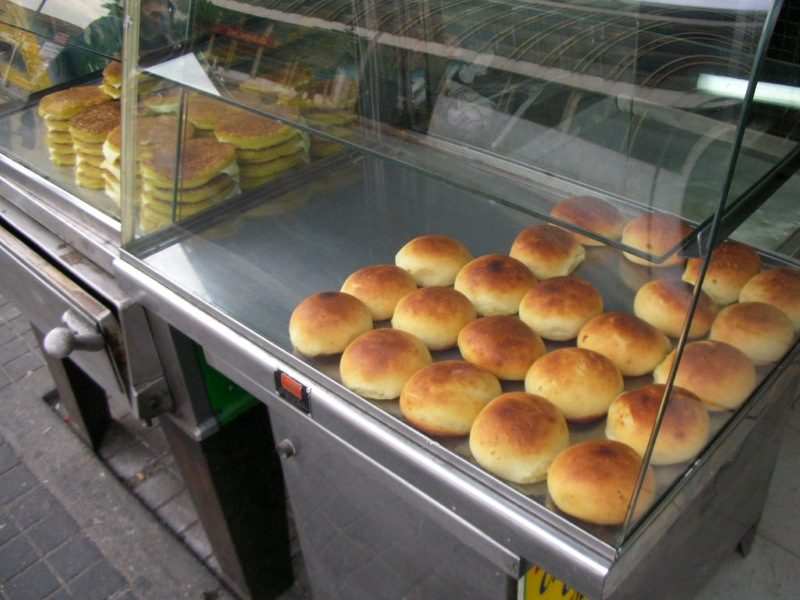
- Type: Bread
- Region or state: Latin America
- Associated cuisine: Chile, Argentina, Colombia, Puerto Rico
- Main ingredients: Corn flour, butter or margarine, eggs, cheese, sugar, leavening agent

Almojábana (Note: Spanish pronunciation: [almoˈxaβana]) is a type of bread made with cuajada cheese and corn flour.

== About ==
An almojábana is a small, bun-shaped bread with a tart flavor. It has some variations between Hispanic America and Spain.

The etymology stems from Andalusī Arabic and that in turn from classical Arabic المُجَٰبَّنة "almuǧábbana" (made of cheese), the measure II passive participle of the root ج-ب-ن, the same root as جُبْن "jubn" (cheese).

== Versions ==
=== Colombia ===
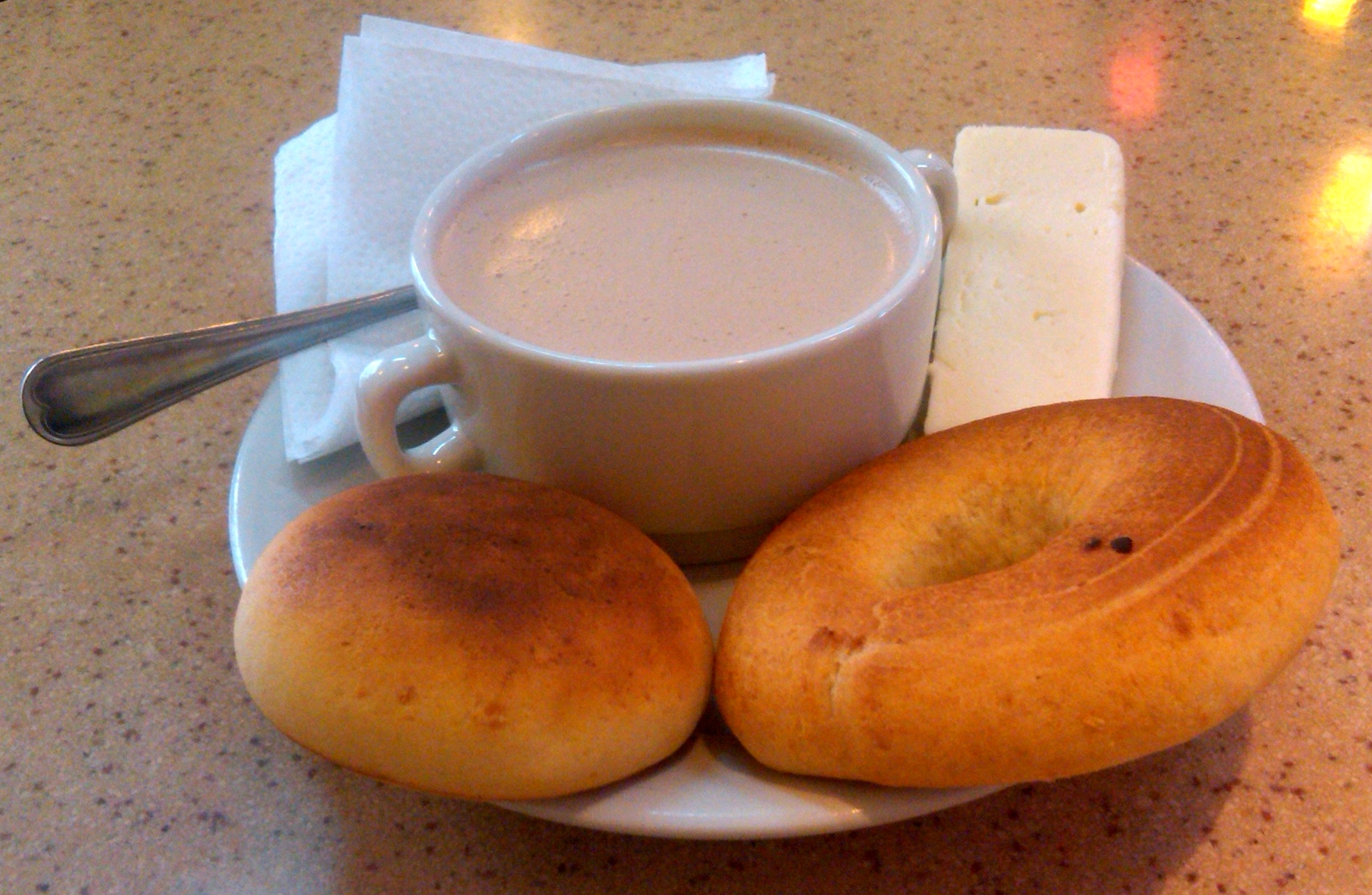
A traditional breakfast in Bogotá and the surrounding region consisting of hot chocolate, cheese, and two kinds of bread: almojábana (left) and pan de queso (right)

Almojábanas are made with masarepa or pre-cooked white cornmeal, cottage cheese, butter, baking powder, salt, eggs, and milk.

=== Puerto Rico ===
In Puerto Rico almojábanas are small fried balls popular in the northwest part of the island. They are sweet or savory made with rice flour, wheat flour, milk, butter, baking powder, salt, and eggs. The most typical almojábanas are savory and filled with cheese. Almojábanas de coco are a sweet version made with coconut and sugar. They are both served with spiced tea or coffee. The Almojában Festival is celebrated in Lares, Puerto Rico in October.

=== Spain ===
Spanish almojábanas do not use cheese; they are made with wheat flour, olive oil, salt, eggs, and honey or sugar or both. They are typical from southern Aragón, southern Alicante, Murcia and La Gomera island.

== See also ==
- Arepa
- Pandebono
