= Julián Rejala =

- Born: Julián Rejala; February 16, 1907; Areguá, Paraguay
- Died: July 13, 1981 (aged 74); Asunción, Paraguay
- Known for: Poetry, Dance
- Notable work: "Che reja guive" "Morena mía" "Olimpia" "Morena mí"
- Awards: Mention of Honor in the First National Exhibit in Paraguay

Julián Rejala (1907–1981) was a Paraguayan guitarist.

He was born in a small town of Aregua, in the Central Department of Paraguay, called “Kokué Guazú”, on February 16, 1907.

He studied guitar with Enriqueta González and interested in theatre he work in Julio Correa's Company, the great creator of Guaraní Theatre.

== First steps ==
In 1934 he formed the Conjunto Folklórico Guaraní (Folkloric Guaraní Group), bringing in Santiago Cortessi, Jorge Caballero, Agustín Cáceres, Agustín Larramendia, José L. Melgarejo, Fidelino Castro Chamorro, and others.

This group was active during and after the Chaco War (between Paraguay and Bolivia from 1932 to 1935). In the beginning the group was under the direction of Roque Centurión Miranda with the name “Elenco Chaco Paraguayo” (Paraguayan Chaco Cast). After the war he founded the first folkloric dancing group in Paraguay, becoming a pioneer in a genre that has continued to develop up through the present.

== Career ==
In 1940 he did presentations in Brazil and joined in Asunción, to Erika Milée's Dance Academy, in Asunción, in quality of professor. In 1944 he continued to teach in the Agrupación Tradicionalista Guaraní (Guaraní Traditional Group).

Many outstanding musicians were in his group. He researched and compiled many folkloric dances and had the great merit of rescuing many traditional dances that were almost forgotten.

Between 1960 and 1965 he did many recordings in Rio de Janeiro, Brazil.

== Work ==
His most well-known songs include:

- “Che reja guive”
- “Morena mía”
- “Sùplica”
- “Olimpia”
- “Alguna vez”
- “Morena mí”
- “Mi brasileñita”
- “Mi folklore”
- “La conquista de Yrendague”

== Awards ==
Among his awards are the Mention of Honor in the First National Exhibit in Paraguay (1940) and the award to the Best Artistic Direction in the International Folklore Competition in Salta, Argentina (1966). He was founder member of the “Autores Paraguayos Asociados – APA” (Association of Paraguayan Authors) and the “Asociación de Escritores Guaraníes – ADEG (Guaraní Writers Association).

== His family ==
He was married to the great singer and teacher Wilma Ferreira.

== Last years ==
He died in Asunción on July 13, 1981.
