= Pandebono =

Colombian bread

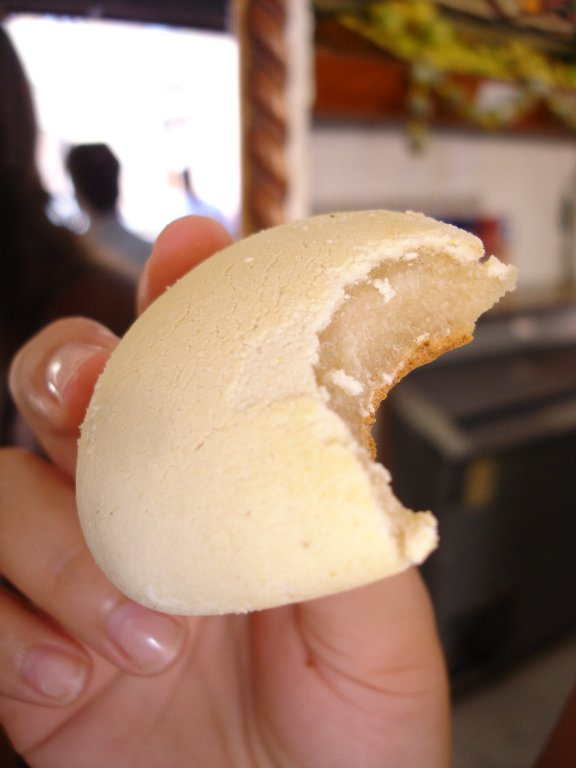
- Pandebono cartagenero
- Type: Bread
- Course: Snack
- Place of origin: Colombia
- Region or state: South America
- Associated cuisine: Colombia
- Serving temperature: Hot or room temperature
- Main ingredients: Cassava starch, cheese and eggs

Pandebono or pan de bono is a type of Colombian bread made of cassava starch, cheese, eggs, and in some regions of the country, guava paste. Traditionally, it is consumed with hot chocolate, still warm a few minutes after baking. It is especially common in the Colombian department of Valle del Cauca. This bread can be made in both a round and a ring shape.

== Etymology ==
The version documented by Edouard André in "Equinoctial America" published in Picturesque America is that there was a place called "Hacienda El Bono" on the road between Dagua and Cali where this product was first prepared. In this hacienda, a bread was made that was consumed by the muleteers who passed by on their way to Buenaventura, and everyone knew it as 'El pan de El Bono' (the bread of El Bono). Oral tradition merged the terms to popularize it as 'pandebono'.

The somewhat valid historical records suggest that it was Genoveva, the matron-cook of Hacienda El Bono, who, in an attempt to enhance the nutritional and sensory value of traditional bread, added cassava starch, then corn, and cheese. Moreover, for the day laborers, pandebono represented a more substantial food, midway between a snack and a meal, capable of lasting all day in their satchels.

== See also ==
- Colombian cuisine
- List of breads
- Pan de yuca
- Pão de queijo
