= Paraguay cheese =

Cows' milk cheese from Paraguay

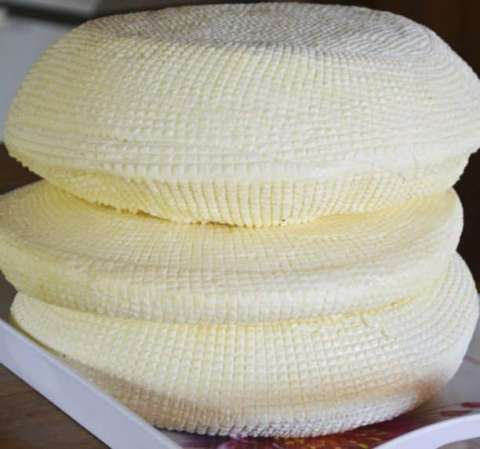

Paraguay cheese (Spanish: queso Paraguay; Guarani: kesú Paraguái) is a cows' milk cheese from Paraguay. It gives the Paraguayan cuisine a high value in calories and proteins, especially in the salted dishes recipes, very characteristic of the country and an important part of its culture.

It is a special type of cheese that is made from “curd” (a preparation that is made by mixing milk with rennet, part of the digestive tract of certain ruminant animals that secretes lactic acid during the digestion process), generally has salt and since it is made with whole milk, is very creamy and nutritious. It is soft and with some acid flavor, and can be preserved for about 45 days.

== Origin of the name ==
The name “kesú paraguai” (Paraguay cheese) comes from the transformation of the words “cheese” (queso in Spanish) and “Paraguay” (Paraguay, as the country) into Guaraní.

The use of the word “paraguai” with an “I” instead of a “y” is because in Guaraní, the “y” is pronounced differently from the Spanish pronunciation and has another meaning, which is “water”.

== Preparation ==
The ingredients used in the manufacture of “Paraguay cheese” are both dairy products: whole milk and curd.

The preparation consists of three processes: the treatment of the rennet, the making of the curd and finally the manufacture of the cheese itself.

The rennet is opened and washed very thoroughly and put in a container with a large amount of sour orange or lemon juice. It is left there to soak in the liquid for about three to four hours and then put out to dry in the sun. When it is dry, the rennet is ready to curdle the milk.

For the curd, the full-fat milk is put inside a container, the rennet is added, then the mixture is stirred occasionally for about an hour. After that time, it is tested by dropping some of the liquid in the palm of the hand, if there are curds then the rennet is removed and the milk is left for a short while to finish the process.

Finally, the cheese is formed by breaking the curd, after which it is left again to settle for another few hours so it loses some liquid called whey. After this, the curd is squeezed until all the liquid is gone. When the curd has no more whey, it is put in specially made frames with rectangular shape called cheese-dishes. The next day the “kesú Paraguay” is ready to be consumed.

== Geological features ==
Paraguay cheese comes from the Criollo cow, which produces milk high in fat. These cows graze in the eastern wetlands of Paraguay, and the plants there are very nutrient-rich.
