= Guarambaré =

Guarambaré Guarambare (Guarani)
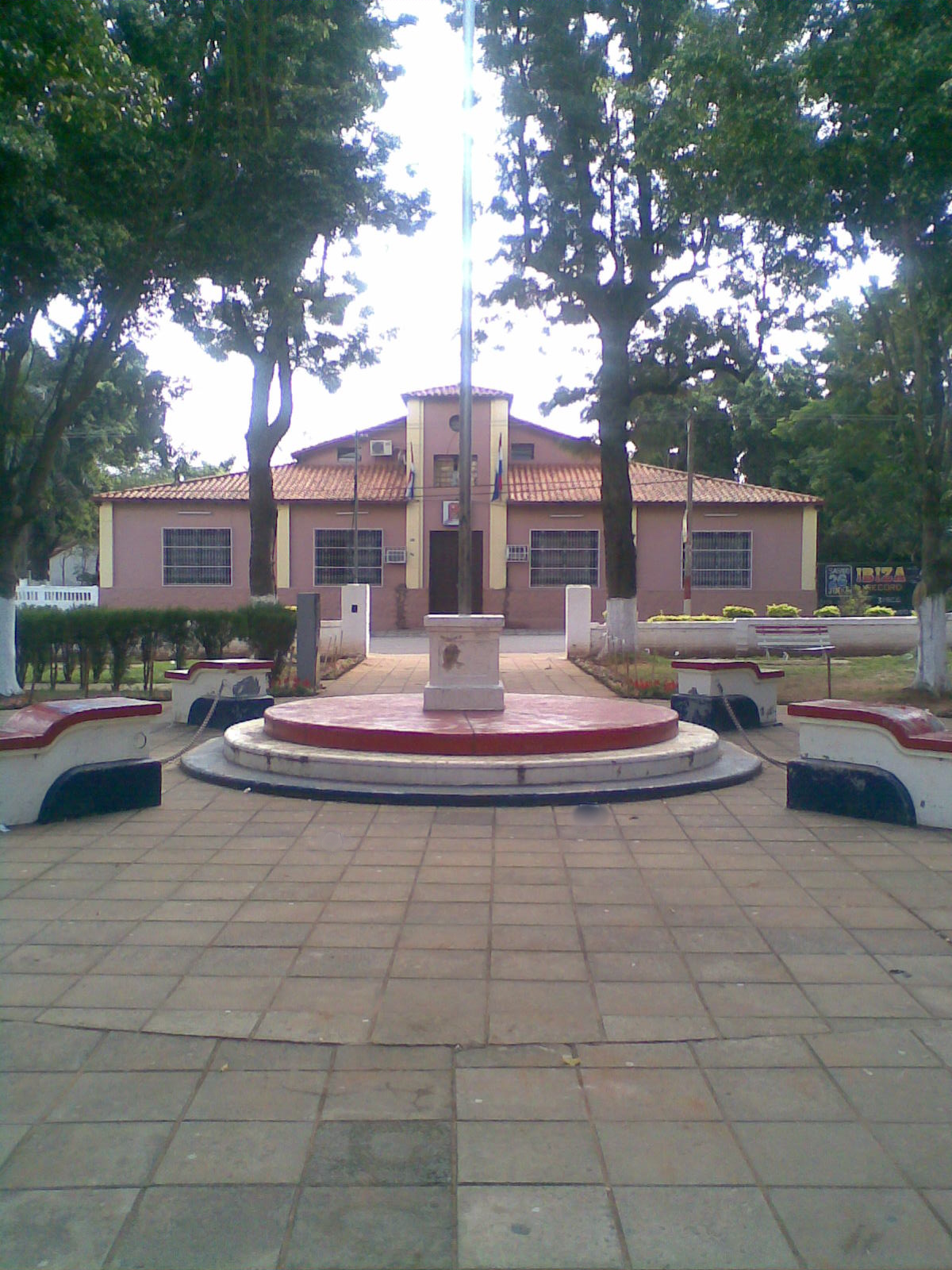

- Location within Paraguay
- Coordinates: 25°29′24″S 57°27′36″W
- Country: Paraguay
- Department: Central

Area
  - Total: 29.79 km^{2} (11.50 sq mi)
- Elevation: 105 m (344 ft)

Population (2022)
  - Total: 27,695
- Climate: Cfa

Guarambaré (Spanish pronunciation: [ɡwaɾambaˈɾe]; Guarani: Guarambare) is a city and district in the Central Department of Paraguay. According to the 2022 national census, the district had a population of 27,695 inhabitants. Guarambaré was the name of a Guaraní tribal chief in the 16th century.

== History ==
Guarambaré was first established in 1539 as an indigenous reduction (reducción de indios) named "Todos los Santos de Guarambaré" (All saints of Guarambare), named after a local chief Pedro Guarambaré of the Guaraní people. A Franciscan reduction was later founded between 1580 and 1600 in the location south of the Aquidabán river, and was relocated in 1673 to the current location, south-east of Asunción. The Franciscan architecture is preserved in several parts of the city. Guarambaré was officially founded on 6 May 1682 during the rule of Governor of Paraguay, Juan Diez de Andino (es) as confirmed by the document held in the Archivo Nacional de Asunción. Paraguayan president Carlos Antonio López signed the official decree of declaration on 7 December 1848.

== Geography and demographics ==
Guarambaré is located in the Central Department of Paraguay. It occupies an area of 2.78 km^{2} (1.07 sq mi). According to the 2022 national census, the district had a population of 27,695 inhabitants.

== Economy ==
The principal economic activities of the city are sugarcane cultivation and sugar production. The city has two sugar factories: the Azucarera Guarambaré and the Ingenio Azucarero La Felsina. Other agricultural activities include the cultivation of tomatoes, watermelons, peppers, cotton, and maize.

== Culture ==
The patron saint feast of Guarambaré is celebrated on 8 September in honour of the Nativity of the Virgin Mary (Natividad de María). A notable tradition during the feast is the vito de dinero, in which banknotes are thrown from the top of the church for the children on the streets below. The city is associated with the poet and musician Emiliano R. Fernández, who was born in the city in 1894.
