= Battle of La China =

- Part of the Chaco War
Date	3–12 February 1934
Location	Gran Chaco
Result	Paraguayan victory

Belligerents
Bolivia	Paraguay

Commanders and leaders
Enrique Peñaranda; Bernardino Bilbao Rioja	José Félix Estigarribia; Gaudioso Núñez

Strength
4,200 men	7,500 men

Casualties and losses
Unknown	Unknown

The Battle of La China was fought amidst the Chaco War between Bolivia and Paraguay, in early February 1934. The Paraguayan I Corps outflanked Fort La China, a Bolivian position deep in the Chaco, forcing its defenders to retreat; the pursuit lasted for a week afterwards, with severe casualties being inflicted upon the outnumbered Bolivians before they managed to escape, aided by the weak Paraguayan supply lines.

== Background and engagement ==
In December 1933, after years of hard fighting in the inhospitable Chaco, Bolivia had been dealt a hard defeat at the Campo Vía pocket, where the center of the Bolivian frontline had been encircled and destroyed. This had left them with a corps defending Fort Magariños, and another Fort La China; there was a huge gap between both positions.

La China was a fort deep in the Chaco, in a densely wooded region, only reachable through muddy roads. Fort La China was the first position on the way towards Fort Ballivián, Bolivia's main remaining position in the Chaco, close to the border with Argentina at the Pilcomayo River. General Estigarribia, overall commander of Paraguayan forces in the theater, planned a limited offensive, as there was a lack of trucks and other means of supply in order to maintain a larger operation.

On January 31, the Paraguayan I Corps started moving towards the Bolivian positions, and on February 3rd reached a point at the road from Fort La China to Fort Cabezón, another Bolivian position, 12 km away from the former; they then began to advance towards La China, but the poor state of the roads made it so that troops closing in from the south were delayed, and the fort's outnumbered defenders were able to mostly leave. La China fell on the same day. A pursuit started, slow and with both sides taking heavy losses, and on February 5th another Bolivian fort, La China Nueva, fell to the Paraguayan forces. On February 7, two other outposts fell, Puesto Tortuga and Fort Jordán, with large amounts of supplies and prisoners being taken.

Finally, on February 12, aided by supporting attacks from the 3rd Corps on surrounding positions, the Paraguayan I Corps was able to take Cabezón, the established goal for the offensive, as set by the constraints on Paraguayan supply lines.

== Aftermath ==
The push by the Paraguayan I Corps had left them mere kilometers away from Fort Ballivián, the key remaining Bolivian position in the Chaco. This rang alarm bells in La Paz, which evacuated the civilian population of cities in the region and sent further reinforcements to the zone. This would, some months later, be exploited by the Paraguayan command in the Carandaitý offensive and the Battle of El Carmen, which focused on weakened sectors of the front.
