= Picuiba offensive =

- Part of the Chaco War
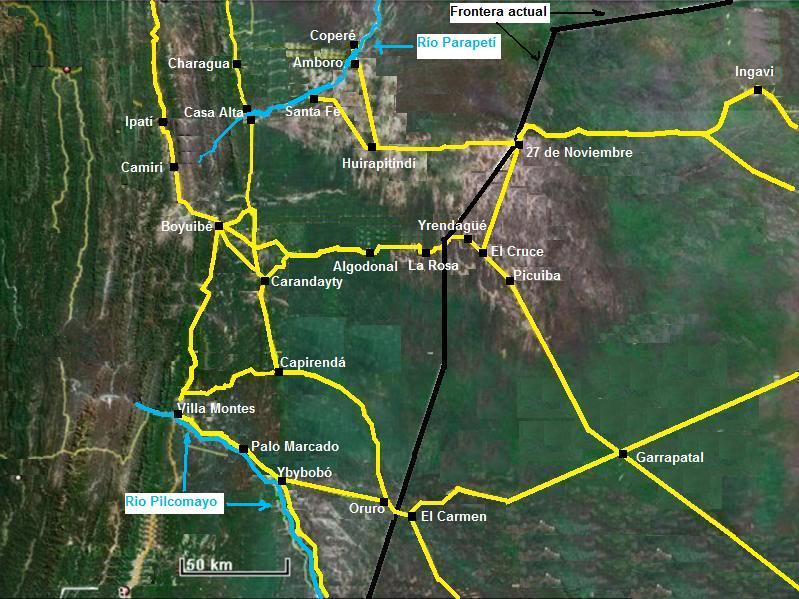
- Map of the northwestern end of the Chaco, where the offensive took place.
Date	5 September – 8 December 1934
Location	Gran Chaco
Result	Indecisive

Belligerents
Bolivia	Paraguay

Commanders and leaders
Enrique Peñaranda; David Toro	José Félix Estigarribia; Rafael Franco

Strength
12,000 - 15,000 men	5,000 men

Casualties and losses
Unknown	400 captured

The Picuiba offensive was fought amidst the Chaco War between Bolivia and Paraguay, in the last months of 1934. The Bolivian Cavalry Corps advanced against the Paraguayan II Corps in the aftermath of the Paraguayan Carandaitý offensive, aiming to retake the land lost in that movement. Though the Bolivian forces outnumbered their opponents heavily, their advance was slow; they had reached Picuiba, their objective, by November 20, but failed to decisively engage their opponents, and by early December the Paraguayan counteroffensive at the Battle of Yrendagüé reversed all their gains.

== Background and engagement ==
Between August and early September 1934, the Paraguayan II Corps under Colonel Rafael Franco had pushed deep into the Bolivian Chaco, nearly capturing Carandaitý, in the foothills of the Andes. In this maneuver they had captured many important Bolivian positions, including Algodonal, Picuiba and Yrendagué, which were crucial sources of water, a scarce good in the Chaco and thus fundamental for further offensive operations. When the Paraguayan attack lost momentum, Bolivian command saw the opportunity to, besides retake the lost land, destroy the II Corps.

The maneuver would be led by Colonel David Toro's Cavalry Corps, the Bolivian Army's best equipped unit. On 5 September, ahead of a force of six regiments, a two-pronged advance resulted in the double envelopment of the Paraguayan 6th Division at Yrendagué, which managed to break out on the night of 8 September, leaving behind their trucks and heavy weaponry, a "humiliation" for the Bolivians and Toro. By this point the Paraguayans were short on water and other supplies, however, and their position was overextended.

On September 22, a new double envelopment attempt by the Cavalry Corps, now centered against Fort Algodonal, again successfully encircled the 6th Division, which broke out the next day by attacking a Bolivian cavalry battalion at night, with the Bolivians suffering around 200 casualties. These failures at destroying the Paraguayan II Corps motivated Toro to seek reinforcements from Bolivian High Command, which came in the form of the 3rd Division from Bilbao Rioja's II Corps.

On November 6, amidst heavy rain, the new Bolivian attack started. It was aimed towards encircling the entire Paraguayan II Corps at Villazón, and, though they managed to surround them, once again the Paraguayans thrusted through gaps in the Bolivian lines, breaking out on late November 10, with a pursuit ensuing until they reached Fort Picuiba. At the same time, Paraguayan forces were advancing on another point of the front in what would be the Battle of El Carmen, resulting in the capture and destruction of the entire Bolivian Reserve Corps. This defeat did not dissuade Toro from his objective of destroying the II Corps, however, despite the newfound isolation of his Cavalry Corps.

Picuiba was taken on November 20, after its Paraguayan defenders retreated southwards. Political maneuvering amidst a coup in Bolivia kept their forces from advancing further, however, despite an offensive posture being maintained, leading to heavy casualties and exhaustion in the Bolivian ranks.

== Aftermath ==
In early December, the Cavalry Corps' relative isolation, and tiredness after months of offensive operations with little result against inferior Paraguayan forces, were used by Paraguayan command in a counteroffensive centered around Yrendagüé, which left them without water and thus open to be encircled and destroyed. All gains obtained by the Bolivians through months of offensive operations were quickly reversed, and the final part of the war, centered around fighting in the Altiplano and the Paraguayan attempt to capture Bolivian oil wells and/or the Santa Cruz department, started.
