= Battle of Ingavi (1935) =

- Part of the Chaco War
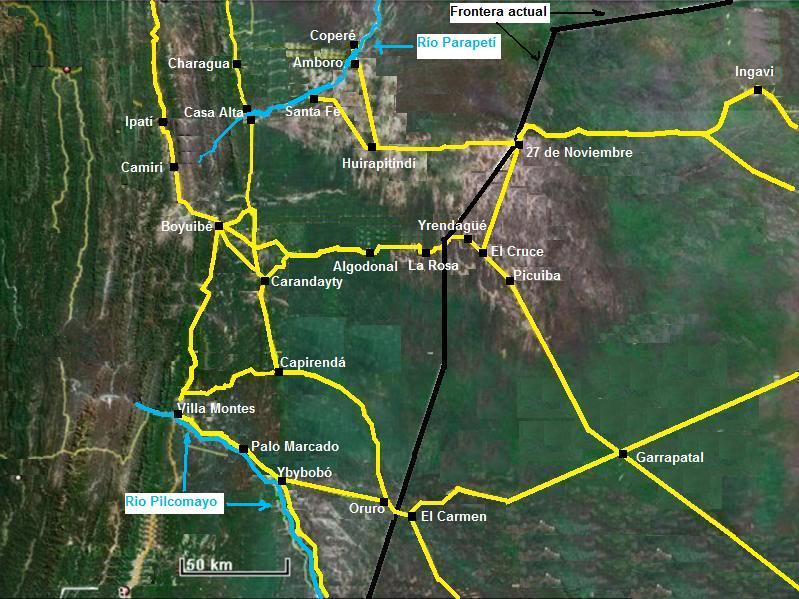
- Map of the northwestern end of the Chaco, where the battle took place.
Date	4 - 8 June 1935
Location	Gran Chaco
Result	Paraguayan victory

Belligerents
Bolivia	Paraguay

Commanders and leaders
Enrique Peñaranda; Ángel Ayoroa	José Félix Estigarribia; José Cazal Rivarola

Strength
1500 men	800 men

Casualties and losses
500 captured	Unknown

The Battle of Ingavi was the last battle fought in the Chaco War between Bolivia and Paraguay. The Bolivian 6th Division attacked Fort Ingavi, an outpost far away from the rest of the frontline garrisoned by a small force, but its defenders managed to delay it enough for reinforcements to arrive. The reinforced Paraguayans then partly surrounded the attackers and made them surrender.

== Background ==
Fort Ingavi, built by the Bolivians at the northern Chaco, regained importance in August 1934 (almost two years after the Chaco War between Bolivia and Paraguay started) when Bolivian president Daniel Salamanca brought up pre-war plans to reach the Paraguay River from it; that river was fundamental to Paraguayan logistics. Learning of this, Paraguayan forces quickly captured Fort 27 de Noviembre which controlled the main supply route to Ingavi, which then was itself occupied October 5 1934.

As the tides of war shifted, however, after the Bolivian general mobilization ordered due to the grave defeats at El Carmen and Yrendagüé, and the Paraguayan failure to capture Villamontes, and a Bolivian offensive was ordered against Ingavi and then ultimately 27 de Noviembre or Fort Aroma, aiming once again to reach the Paraguay River.

== Engagement ==
On late April 1935, the Bolivian 6th Division, circa 1,500 men strong in two regiments, 14th Infantry Regiment "Florida" and 2nd Cavalry Regiment "Ballivián", started to move towards Ingavi, defended by little more than 200 Paraguayan soldiers. The defense of the fort was important given the negotiations going on with Bolivia to end the war, and the need to keep the battle lines as far away from the Paraguay River as possible when armistice was ordered.

The Bolivian troops took Pozo del Tigre, an advanced position 9 km ahead of Fort Ingavi, without great issues. When they attacked the fort, however, they were repealed, suffering circa 100 casualties,. The 6th Division's commander, Lieutenant Colonel Ángel Ayoroa, ordered his troops to hunker down at Pozo del Tigre, hoping for reinforcements and resupply before another attempt; a plan was also drawn up by the divisional chief of staff to draw the Paraguayans from Ingavi towards the Pozo and then encircle them.

On 4 June 1935, after some initial reinforcements arrived, the Paraguayans, 800 men strong, moved against the 3rd Division at Pozo del Tigre. They quickly surrounded the 14th Inf. Reg., and, despite attempts by both it and the 2nd Cav. Reg. to break it out, part of both units ended up in the pocket. 500 men were captured, including Lieutenant Colonel Bretel, then the divisional commander. When peace was declared on 14 June, the Paraguayans were still in pursuit of the 6th Division's remnants, having pushed 32 km from Ingavi, an offensive movement which, together with the 6th Division's initial defeat, influenced peace talks.
