= Battle of Capirenda =

- Part of the Chaco War
Date	5-11 January 1935
Location	Gran Chaco
Result	Paraguayan victory

Belligerents
Bolivia	Paraguay

Commanders and leaders
Enrique Peñaranda; Carlos Quintanilla	José Félix Estigarribia; Carlos Fernández

Casualties and losses
550-1500 dead, missing or captured	Unknown

The Battle of Capirenda was fought amidst the Chaco War between Bolivia and Paraguay, in early January 1935. A Paraguayan corps advanced against the first Bolivian line of defense in the foothills of the Andes after Paraguayan victories in late 1934 made almost all the Bolivian positions in the Chaco untenable. The outnumbered Bolivians gave some ground, and lost most of two regiments to an encirclement.

== Background and engagement ==
In early January 1935, the Paraguayan I Corps under Colonel Carlos Fernándes, composed of the 1st, 2nd and 7th Divisions approached the new Bolivian defense lines on the foothills of the Andes, built up after the Bolivian defeats at Yrendagüé and Ybibobó forced them away from most of their remaining positions in the Chaco. The main Paraguayan objective in this phase of the war were the fortifications in Villamontes, the key position in their way to the Bolivian oilwells. Anchoring Villamontes' left was Capirendá, a fortified town on hilly terrain with three small lakes, defended by the Bolivian 3rd Division.

Fearing a double envelopment by the I Corps, General Carlos Quintanilla, commanding the Central Sector of the front, moved reinforcements to its left flank, but the Paraguayan 7th Division still managed to encircle both forward regiments on 5 January. Though two other Bolivian regiments were employed in a counterattack aiming to break the encirclement, they failed to do so. The Bolivians lost 532 men between those captured, killed, and missing, and then Capirendá fell on 11 January 1935. Five days later, what remained of the Bolivian 3rd Division fell back 20 km, to a position named Palma Sola.

The Bolivian defensive failure, in the first action after David Toro's promotion to chief of staff of the Bolivian Army, was blamed upon Major Ricardo Monge, who had commanded the 47th Regiment and died in the battle. Capirendá's loss broke the communications between Villamontes and Carandaitý, the forwardmost Bolivian position in the Chaco, which would fall on January 23, and had a very harmful effect towards Bolivian public opinion. The 3rd Division's retreat was, still, very positive for the Bolivians, as if the rest of its regiments had been captured their position at Villamontes would have been seriously threatened.
