= Battle of Ybibobó =

- Part of the Chaco War
Date	28–31 December 1934
Location	Ybibobó, Gran Chaco
Result	Paraguayan victory

Belligerents
Bolivia	Paraguay

Commanders and leaders
Enrique Peñaranda; Enrique Frias; Jenaro Blacutt	José Félix Estigarribia; Nicolás Delgado; Alfredo Ramos

Strength
3,300 men	3,700 men

Casualties and losses
600 dead 2000 prisoners	46 wounded

The Battle of Ybibobó was fought in late December 1934 by Bolivia and Paraguay during the Chaco War. The Bolivian 9th Division, on a recently established defensive line around Ybybobó, was encircled and made to surrender. The Paraguayan victory allowed them access to the foothills of the Andes, expelling Bolivia from one of its last positions in the Chaco.

== Background ==
After the defeat at the Battle of El Carmen and the retreat from Fort Ballivián, the Bolivian 1st Corps, made out of the 4th and 9th Divisions, was pushed to Ybybobó, some 70 km to the northwest of El Carmen, where a new defensive line was established. The 4th Division occupied Fort D'Orbigny, on the border with Argentina, and was arrayed on a line to the north; the 9th Division had its right braced on the Pilcomayo River, facing east and linking with the 8th Division to the northeast. It had 2,500 men to cover 18 km of front.

During the second half of December, when what was left from David Toro's Cavalry Corps was retreating after the disastrous Battle of Yrendagüé, forces from the Paraguayan 3rd Corps discovered a gap of 8 km between the Bolivian 8th and 9th Divisions and began building a trail towards the latter's rear. Though this movement was spotted by Bolivian airplanes, divisional command lacked the men to counter it, and assumed it as minor, given the rough terrain there.

Colonel Nicolás Delgado, the 3rd Corps' commander, saw the circumstances as promising, however. He sent Major Alfredo Ramos' 2nd Cavalry Division, 2,400 men strong, to attack the Bolivian 9th Division from the rear, while the rest of the corps, 1,300 men, pressured it from the front.

== Engagement ==
The Paraguayan attack started at 4 AM on December 28, making use of a heavy storm which had started the day before as cover. One of the Paraguayan cavalry regiments, the 5th, penetrated the enemy lines in silence and cut it off from the only road that ran towards the river. This move paralyzed Bolivian command, cutting the 9th Division's communications with them, so that much of that unit's men did not leave their trenches and camps while they were surrounded by the rest of the attackers. The Bolivian 4th Infantry Regiment, supported by part of the division's artillery, tried to push out from inside the pocket, but failed. By 17:00, both wings of the Paraguayan encirclement had met and inside the pocket were most of two regiments, all of the 8th Cavalry and most of the 2nd Infantry, part of the divisional artillery (the rest marched out at the beginning of the encirclement without firing a single shot) and a reconnaissance squadron. At night, the Paraguayans were reinforced by the arrival of two other regiments, and managed to enircle what was left out of the pocket of the Bolivian 2nd Infantry Regiment amidst a chaotic situation. Several officers and hundreds of men were already taken prisoner then.

Over the following two days, despite various attempts to breakout from the forces inside the pocket, their men were gradually made to surrender. The rest of the Army did not come to their aid, and eventually hundreds of men would throw themselves on the Pilcomayo's raging waters trying to escape. The only organized break outs were that of 280 men of the Bolivian 8th Cavalry Regiment, and a battalion from another regiment.

== Surrender and aftermath ==
On 3 January 1935, what was left of the 9th Division surrendered. Overall 2,000 men were made prisoner, some 400 died in combat, and another 200 drowned in the Pilcomayo. Paraguayan forces had small losses. Colonel Enrique Frias, commander of the Bolivian 1st Corps, and Lieutenant Colonel Blacutt, the divisional commander, escaped the pocket. An important obstacle was removed on the Paraguayan forces' way towards the Andes.
