= Carandaitý offensive =

1934 Paraguayan offensive in the Chaco War

- Part of the Chaco War
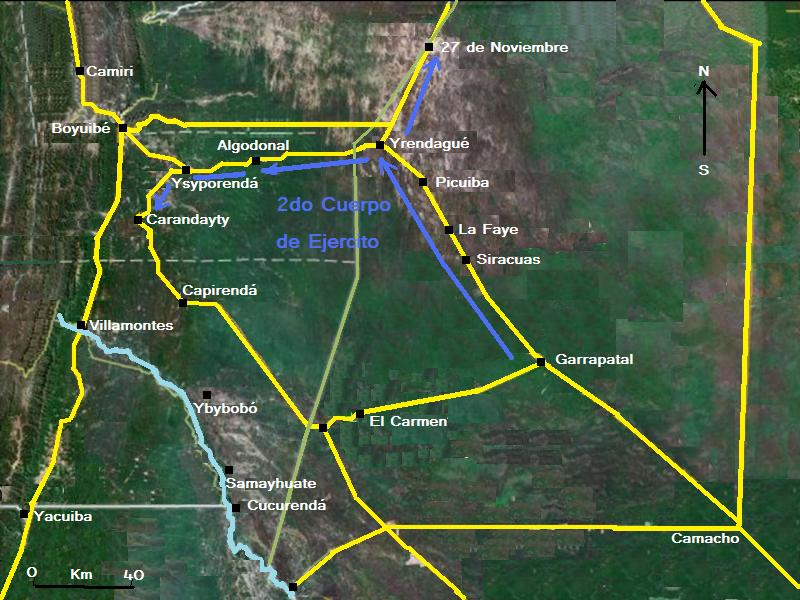
- Map showing the Paraguayan 2nd Corps' movement during the offensive.
Date	15 August - 2 September 1934
Location	Gran Chaco
Result	Paraguayan victory

Belligerents
Bolivia	Paraguay

Commanders and leaders
Enrique Peñaranda; Bernardino Bilbao Rioja; José Leonardo Lanza	José Félix Estigarribia; Rafael Franco

Strength
9000 men	15000 men

Casualties and losses
At least 1000 captured	Unknown

The Carandaitý offensive was a military operation of the Chaco War between Bolivia and Paraguay, where the Paraguayan 2nd Corps pushed through an inhospitable zone in the Chaco to capture Bolivian Fort 27 de Noviembre, foiling a Bolivian plan to push to the Paraguay River; they then turned to the west, towards Carandaitý, a fortified position barring the way towards the Andes and the Bolivian oil wells. Despite not being able to capture Carandaitý, the Paraguayans took large amounts of land and supplies during the offensive; this land would be fought over by the opposing armies over the next months.

== Background ==
From May 1934, Paraguayan aviators and patrols saw the Bolivians building landing fields and new roads southeast of Fort Ingavi, the base of General José Leonardo Lanza's expanding III Corps. The Paraguayan commander, José Félix Estigarribia, expected this force to move toward the Paraguay River or against the Paraguayan post at Pitiantuta. In July the Paraguayan president approved his plan for a quick strike at Fort Picuíba and the capture of Fort 27 de Noviembre, which lay on the main supply road of Lanza's troops. The blow would also threaten the Bolivian rear along the Parapetí River and at Carandaitý.

== Offensive ==
Leaving Fort Garrapatal on 13 August 1934, the Paraguayan 2nd Corps, tasked with the offensive, encircled Fort Picuíba by surprise on 15 August, taking prisoner almost 1,000 men and important supplies at the cost of 28 casualties. Afterwards, they marched to and captured El Cruce, at which point their column divided into two, one of which marched towards Yrendagüé and the other towards 27 de Noviembre. A Paraguayan regiment, mounted on trucks, took 27 de Noviembre by surprise on 17 August, while the 6th Division took Yrendagüé. The speed of the advance, which had covered 120 km in only 5 days, had caught Bolivian command unaware. Taking advantage of this, a new objective was given to the 2nd Corps: Carandaitý, the gateway to the Parapetí River, which delimitated Paraguay's claim on the Chaco.

=== Algodonal ===
This new advance already started on 17 August 1934. Mounted on trucks, at great speed, the 6th Division advanced 160 km over 13 days, through a sandy desert and then thick brush, leaving behind their artillery and also the retreating enemy. One of its regiments, the 14th Infantry Regiment "Cerro Corá", having covered 100 km in 3 days, arrived at El Cruce de Huirapitindí, 45 km from the Parapetí River. On August 22, the Battle of Algodonal was fought, where the 6th Division encircled and took Fort Algodonal by surprise, forcing its 1,016 defenders to surrender or retreat.

== Carandaitý and aftermath ==
Though the Paraguayan advance managed to get to 5 km from Carandaitý, they did not manage to take it, as its garrison had been reinforced. The Bolivians had finally amassed a strong force to detain them, and they lacked supplies to continue pushing. Water was being sent from Garrapatal, 250 km away at that point. The supply situation on the 2nd Corps' front would only be partly solved in late October, when Paraguayan engineers managed to drill wells in Yrendagüé.

Only a few months afterwards, the Bolivians started a massive offensive to retake the land captured during the Carandaitý operation, putting Colonel David Toro's newly formed Cavalry Corps to the task.
