= Battle of Algodonal =

- Part of the Chaco War
Date	21-22 August 1934
Location	Gran Chaco
Result	Paraguayan victory

Belligerents
Bolivia	Paraguay

Commanders and leaders
Enrique Peñaranda; Walter Méndez	José Félix Estigarribia; Rafael Franco

Strength
1016 men	4200 men (Note: At the beginning of offensive operations in early August 1934.)

Casualties and losses
"Numerous" dead 155 captured	20 dead

The Battle of Algodonal was an engagement during the Chaco War between Paraguayan and Bolivian forces. It was part of a wider offensive by the Paraguayan 2nd Corps towards Carandaity, a Bolivian fortified position deep in the Chaco. The battle was a comprehensive Paraguayan victory over a Bolivian detachment.

== Background ==
The Paraguayan II Corps, under Rafael Franco, which had previously captured Picuiba in 14-15 August, advanced thence to the west at speed, starting the Carandaitý offensive, covering 70 km in 6 days, in a desertic zone where any movement had to be careful, as positions a defender could set up ambushes in were plentiful. On 20 August, they arrived at Algodonal, a midway point to Carandaity, their ultimate goal. Carandaity was a Bolivian fortified position, with access to water, a scarce good in the Chaco, and its capture would allow the Paraguayan Army to attack and possibly capture the Bolivian oil wells in the foothills of the Andes.

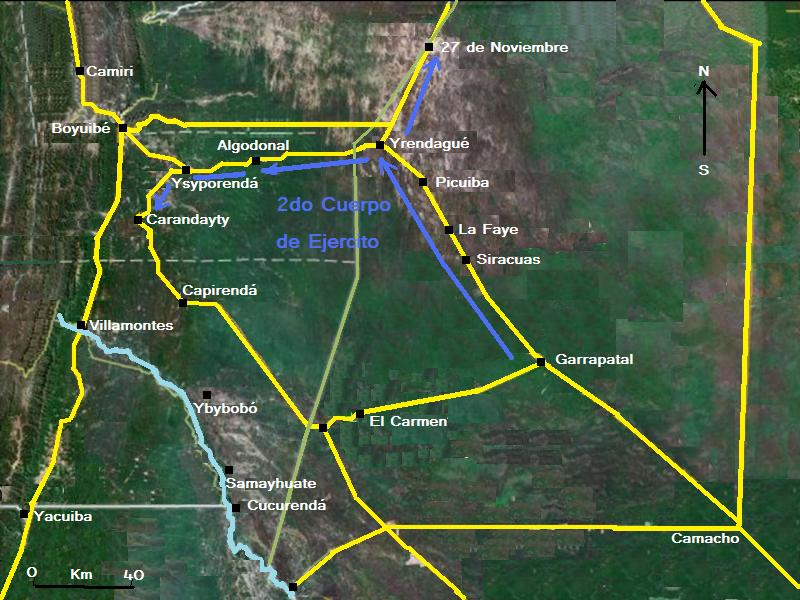
The advance of the Paraguayan 2nd Corps in August-September 1934

== Engagement ==
Bolivian defenders in the region where caught by surprise by the fast strike of a whole enemy division from a desert region. On August 20, the first Paraguayan troops arrived in the fort's vicinity and made contact with the enemy.

On August 22, Algodonal fell. It was encircled after some delays in producing water for the rear guard for a march out of the fort meant it could no longer do so, and then surrendered. A large quantity of supplies and weapons (some new and still in boxes) was captured, and also 16 trucks.

Algodonal would be abandoned by Paraguayan forces in September of the same year after a Bolivian attempt at encircling the position.
