= Bernardino Bilbao Province =

Province in Bolivia

Provincia Bernardino Bilbao
- Province
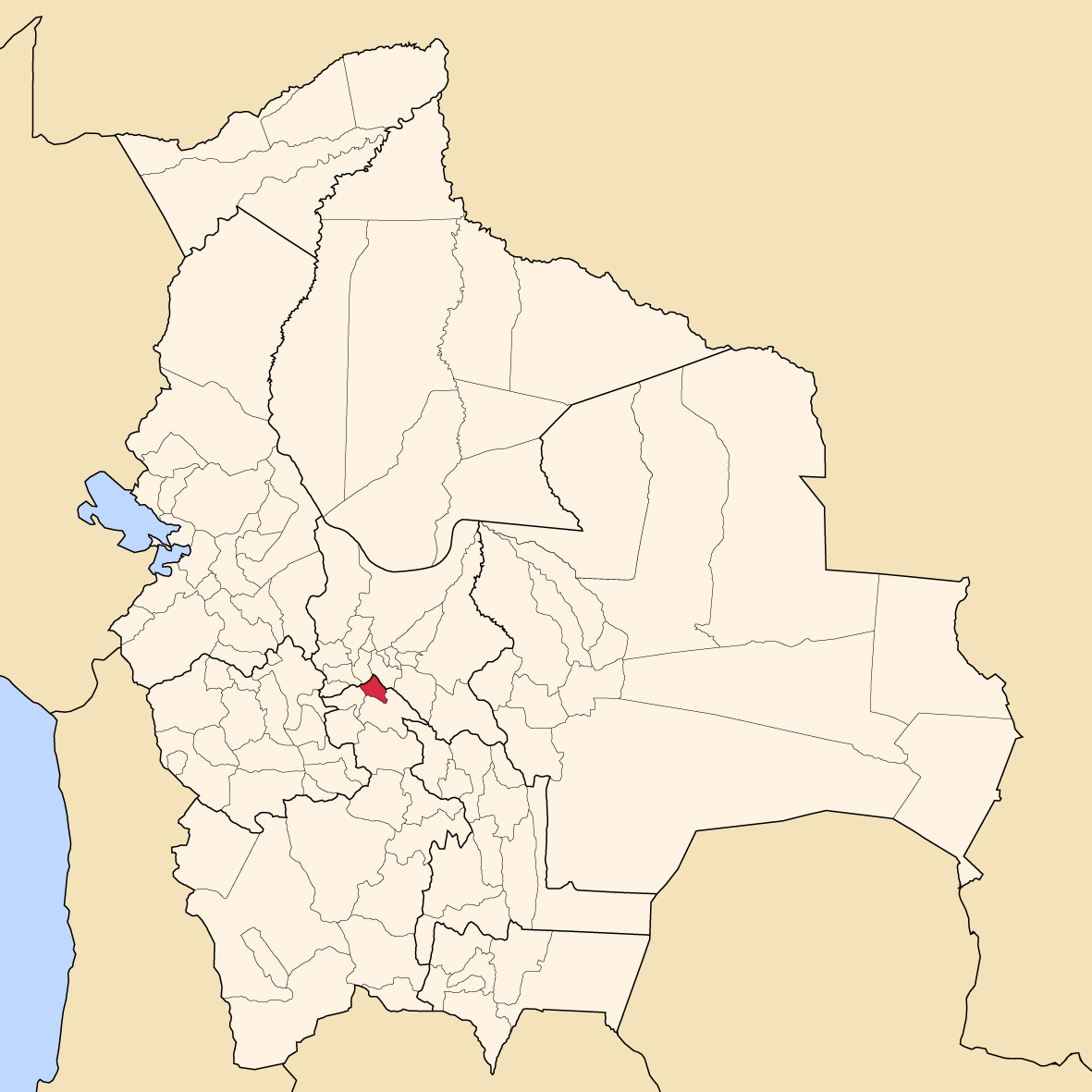
- Interactive map of Provincia Bernardino Bilbao
- Coordinates: 18°00′S 66°04′W
- Country: Bolivia
- Department: Potosí

Area
  - Total: 786 km^{2} (303 sq mi)

Population (2024)
  - Total: 8,057
  - Density: 10.3/km^{2} (26.5/sq mi)
- ISO 3166 code: BO.PO.GB

Bernardino Bilbao (or: General Bernardino Bilbao Rioja) is a province in the Northern parts of the Bolivian department of Potosí. It has its name after Bernardino Bilbao Rioja, Bolivian general and politician.

== Location ==
Bernardino Bilbao province is one of sixteen provinces in the Potosí Department. It is located between 17° 49' und 18° 10' South and between 65° 53' und 66° 16' West. It borders Cochabamba Department in the North, Alonso de Ibáñez Province in the Southwest, and Charcas Province in the South.

The province extends over 55 km (34 mi) from east to west and 60 km (37 mi) from north to south.

== Population ==
The main language of the province is Quechua, spoken by 99% of the population, while 40% also speak Spanish. The population increased from 10,045 inhabitants (1992 census) to 10,623 (2001 census), an increase of 5.8%. The capital of the province is Arampampa (1,703 inhabitants).

99% of the population have no access to electricity, while 94% have no sanitary facilities. 62% of the population are employed in agriculture, 0.5% in mining, 17.5% in industry, and 20% in general services. 92% of the population are Catholics, and 5% are Protestants.

== Division ==
The province comprises two municipalities which are further subdivided into cantons.

- Arampampa Municipality
  - Seat: Arampampa
- Acasio Municipality
  - Seat: Acasio
