= Second Battle of Herrera =

- Part of the Chaco War
Date	25–27 March 1933
Location	Gran Chaco
Result	Paraguayan victory

Belligerents
Bolivia	Paraguay

Commanders and leaders
Hans Kundt	José Félix Estigarribia; Paulino Antola

Strength
1961 men 7 guns	1000 men 2 guns

Casualties and losses
Unknown	Unknown

The Second Battle of Herrera took place in March 1933 during the Chaco War between Bolivia and Paraguay. Barely two months after a failed attempt by Bolivian forces at taking Fort Herrera, they came back to the region in greater force, but once again were defeated by the defenders.

== Background and engagement ==
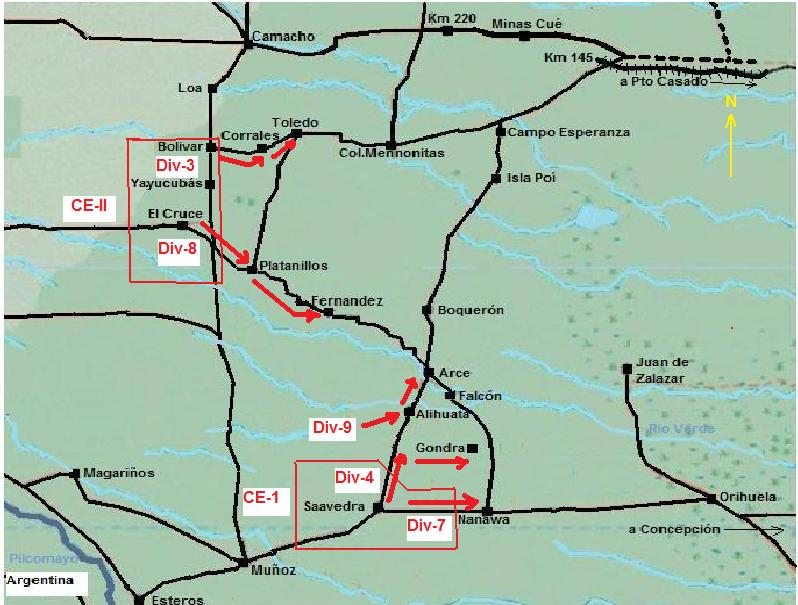
Bolivian advances in progress between January and March 1933.

In early March 1933, Hans Kundt, overall commander of the Bolivian forces, thought that capturing Fort Herrera (formerly Fort Fernández) would allow them to advance on a broader axis on Fort Francia (formerly Fort Arce). He sent the 8th Division towards Fort Herrera, a unit which had already attempted to capture the position in January 1933. This would also serve to draw Paraguayan forces away from Fort Toledo, under pressure by the 3rd Division.

On 10 March 1933, the 8th Division, under Colonel Rafael Morant, marched towards Fort Herrera from Fort Platanillos, 5 regiments and two artillery groups strong, totaling 1961 men and 7 guns, plus air support. They were underfed and tired from earlier actions, and slowed down by rain. On the Paraguayan side, the fort was defended by 1st Infantry Regiment "Dos de Mayo" and a battalion of 3rd Infantry Regiment "Corrales", adding up to circa 1000 men and 2 guns. They had, since the earlier battle over the fort in January, built quebracho fortifications and a more complex trench system.

The Bolivian commander sent 2 of his regiments (circa 500 men) to circle around the fort on March 20, so as to cut its communication and supplies from Fort Francia, and then attack it from all sides. This force got confused and tired in the heat of the Chaco, however, and took too long to reach their objective; they had also lost contact with the main force which, assuming the former had reached their objective, unfruitfully launched a series of bloody frontal attacks against the fort, starting on March 25. When the secondary force reached their objective, they found themselves isolated, were engaged by the force from the 3rd regiment, and had to retreat back to the attack's staging point.

On 27 March, the Bolivian force started to return to Fort Platanillos, later pursued by the whole of the Paraguayan 2nd Infantry Division. In May, the 8th Division would once more attack the fort, also unsuccessfully.
