= 1934 Bolivian coup d'état =

Coup d'état in Bolivia on 27 November 1934

Corralito of Villamontes
- Part of the Chaco War
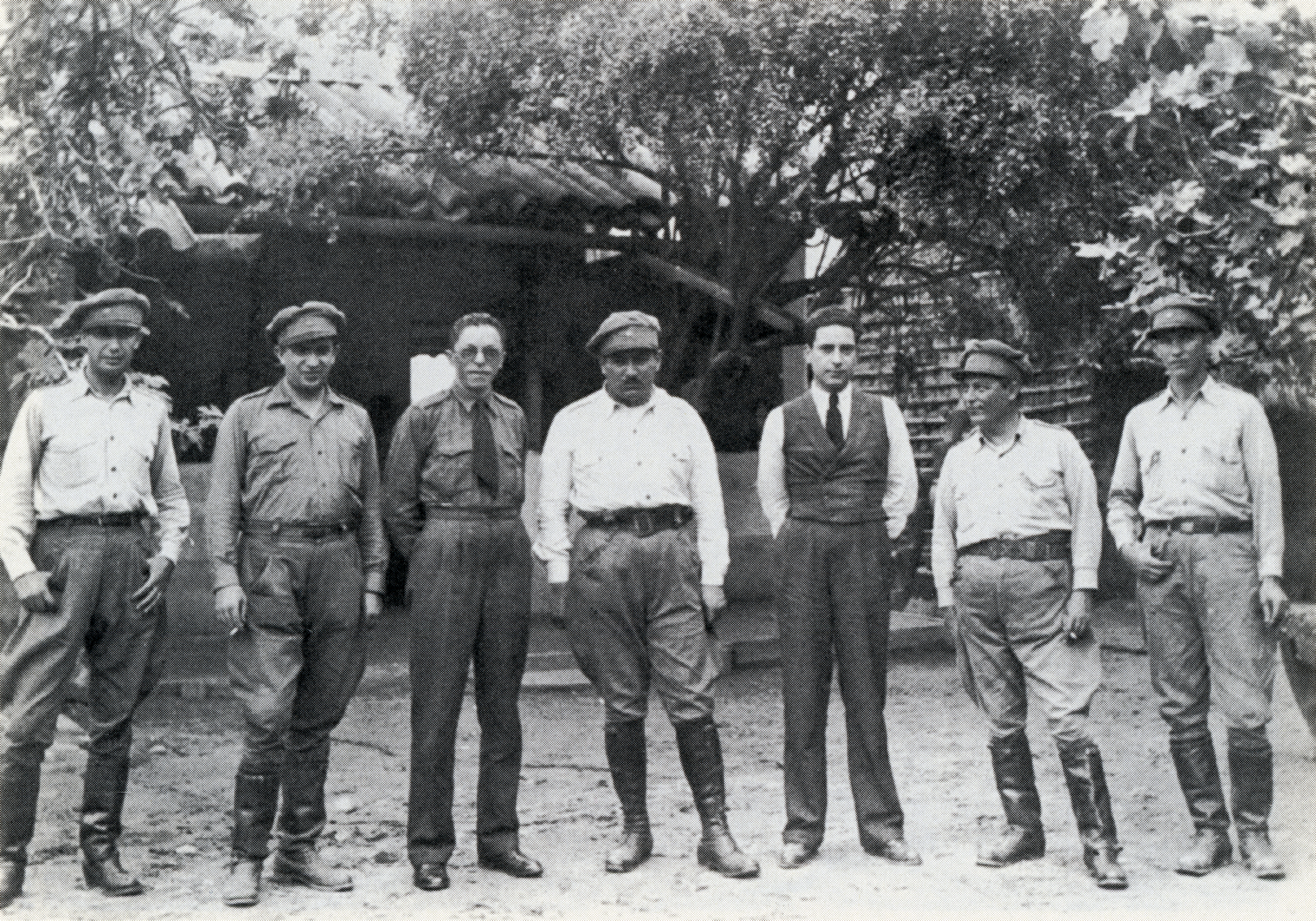
- Enrique Peñaranda and Germán Busch among other military officers in Samayhuate, c. 1934.
Date	27 November 1934
Location	Villamontes, Tarija, Bolivia 21°15′54″S 63°28′18″W
Result	Military coup d'état successful: Daniel Salamanca detained and deposed; Results of the 1934 general election annulled; Vice President José Luis Tejada Sorzano's ascension to the office of president

Belligerents
(Bolivia) Bolivian Government: Genuine Republican Party	(Bolivia) Bolivian Armed Forces: Bolivian Army

Commanders and leaders
Daniel Salamanca; José Leonardo Lanza; Demetrio Canelas; José Antonio Quiroga; Rafael de Ugarte	Enrique Peñaranda; Germán Busch; Julio Sanjinés; Felipe M. Rivera

Units involved
None	4th Artillery Group

The 1934 Bolivian coup d'état, colloquially known as the Corralito of Villamontes (Spanish: Corralito de Villamontes), (Note: The Spanish word corralito is the diminutive form of corral, which means to gather together and confine (a group of people or things); this is in reference to the methods used during the coup.) was a military coup in Bolivia that deposed President Daniel Salamanca in the midst of the Chaco War. Two days before the coup, Salamanca and his presidential delegation arrived at the military headquarters in Villamontes with the intent of removing General Enrique Peñaranda as commander-in-chief of the armed forces and replacing him with General José Leonardo Lanza. In response, on 27 November 1934, army high command directed a group of military officers led by Captain Germán Busch to arrest the president and force his resignation.

After the coup, the military resolved to allow Vice President José Luis Tejada Sorzano to assume the presidency to oversee the conclusion of the Chaco War. The coup also annulled the 1934 general elections, which occurred a few weeks prior. Tejada Sorzano's mandate was extended twice before he himself was overthrown in another coup d'état in May 1936.

== Background ==
The end of 1934 spotlighted a marked deterioration in the mandate of President Daniel Salamanca. Throughout the course of the Chaco War, the Bolivian war effort was hampered by a bitter conflict between the government and the high command of the armed forces over Salamanca's questionable military decisions. Immediately at the onset of the war in June 1932, Salamanca's attempt to replace General Filiberto Osorio with General José Leonardo Lanza as commander-in-chief of the army was blocked by Colonel David Toro who incited his superior, General Carlos Quintanilla, into rejecting the appointment. Such outright insubordination in times of war could have easily merited a court martial or even execution but was not only permitted by Salamanca but allowed to stand, setting a precedent which emboldened the army to continue to test the president's authority.

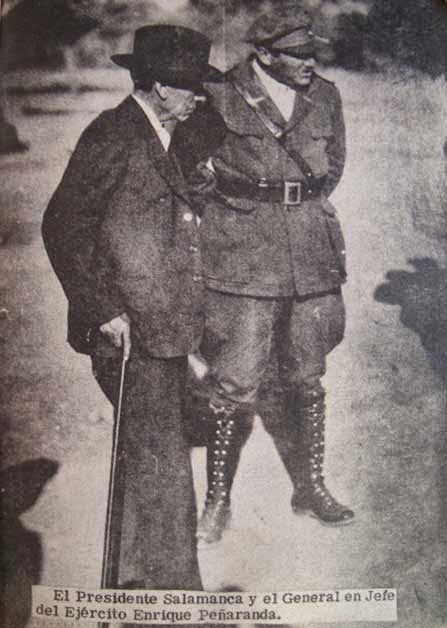
President Salamanca with General Peñaranda in the Chaco.

This permanent lack of cooperation between the government in La Paz and the military headquartered at Samayhuate, Villamontes erupted into a political crisis in August 1934. In that month, Salamanca requested the transfer of Colonel Felipe M. Rivera, chief of staff of the superior command, to the post of chief of the auxiliary general staff in La Paz to reorganize the rearguard services, replacing him in the field with Colonel Bernardino Bilbao Rioja. General Enrique Peñaranda, the commander-in-chief of the armed forces, initially stalled in carrying out the order. By the second half of September, he indicated to Minister of War Luis Fenando Guachalla that there was "stubborn resistance" to introducing Bilbao Rioja to the General Staff. This pushback was undoubtedly coming from Toro who in 1930 had been a member of the government overthrown by a military junta of which Bilbao Rioja was a part of. Peñaranda indicated that Bilbao Rioja's appointment would risk army unity and requested that Rivera be preserved for another month while Peñaranda worked to calm the rivalries between the officers.

After a month of continued inaction, Salamanca met with Peñaranda in Tarija on 23 September. That very day, Salamanca had received reports surrounding musings of a potentially imminent coup. As a result, the meeting was tense, with the president levelling accusations of insolence and insubordination at the general. The tirade reached its climax when Peñaranda himself began to raise his voice, leading the president's son, Rafael Salamanca, to intervene, brandishing his revolver. Despite being at a clear disadvantage, Peñaranda convinced Salamanca not only to preserve but extend Rivera's presence in the General Staff indefinitely. Rivera, in turn, launched an invective on Colonel Ángel Rodríguez and it was resolved the next day that he should be replaced.

From Tarija, the presidential delegation traveled to Samayhuate. There, Salamanca was met by a cold, bordering on hostile reception among the military command. Distaste towards him was so high that, despite Rodríguez's own unpopularity, resistance towards his removal began to form. Salamanca ultimately returned to La Paz with none of his objectives having been achieved. Guachalla noted that "the president, undoubtedly annoyed by so many setbacks, left [Peñaranda] full freedom to do what was convenient for him. It did not escape several of us that Colonel David Toro was not touched [...]. He was the political leader of the Army [...]".

The final blow to the relationship between Salamanca and the armed forces came in the second week of November 1934. In the Battle of El Carmen, the Paraguayan army executed one of the most strategically and tactically successful maneuvers of the entire war. Around 3000 Bolivian soldiers and the Ingavi fortress were captured, leaving the Bolivian army with an almost impossible to recover gap in their front lines. The disastrous military situation also posed a political crisis for the government. Major newspapers such as El Diario and La Razón began to openly question Salamanca's war policy as a result. It was the last straw for the president, who resolved to personally travel to the Chaco and dismiss the high command.

== The corralito ==
=== Intrigue at Samayhuate ===
Salamanca departed La Paz for Villamontes on 21 November 1934. Accompanying him was a presidential delegation made up of his son, Hernán; Vice President-elect Rafael de Ugarte, his brother-in-law; Minister of Government José Antonio Quiroga; and Minister of War Demetrio Canelas. They were additionally joined by military aides and eight policemen. The delegation, joined by Lanza and Miguel Candía, arrived on 25 November with the objective of removing Peñaranda and Rivera, replacing them with Lanza and the lieutenant colonel Luis Añez.

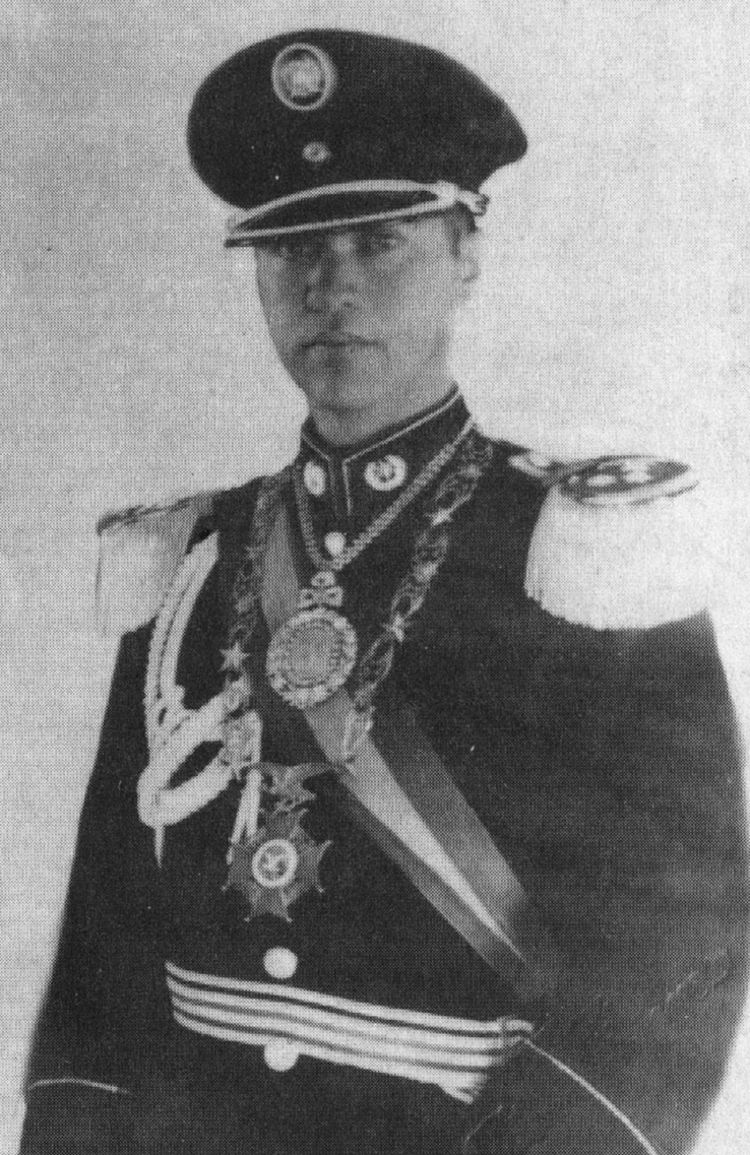
Germán Busch carried out the coup in the field.

Knowledge of Salamanca's intentions immediately sparked intrigue among the outgoing high command. That evening, Salamanca, Lanza, and three ministers dined with Germán Busch and Añez. While the conversation remained cordial, both officers wished to overthrow Salamanca but were prevented from doing so by Peñaranda who remained reluctant to act. On the evening of 26 November, Peñaranda met with General Julio Sanjinés, Colonels Rivera and Víctor E. Serrano, and Captain Busch, with the military historian Julio Díaz Arguedas present as a witness. Díaz Arguedas recounts that Busch told Peñaranda that the military "will not allow these politicians to insult you and dismiss you in the way they are doing it, because only we know of the hardships you have experienced in the campaign" and requested the general's "authorization so that we can apprehend them and expel them from the undeserved positions they occupy".

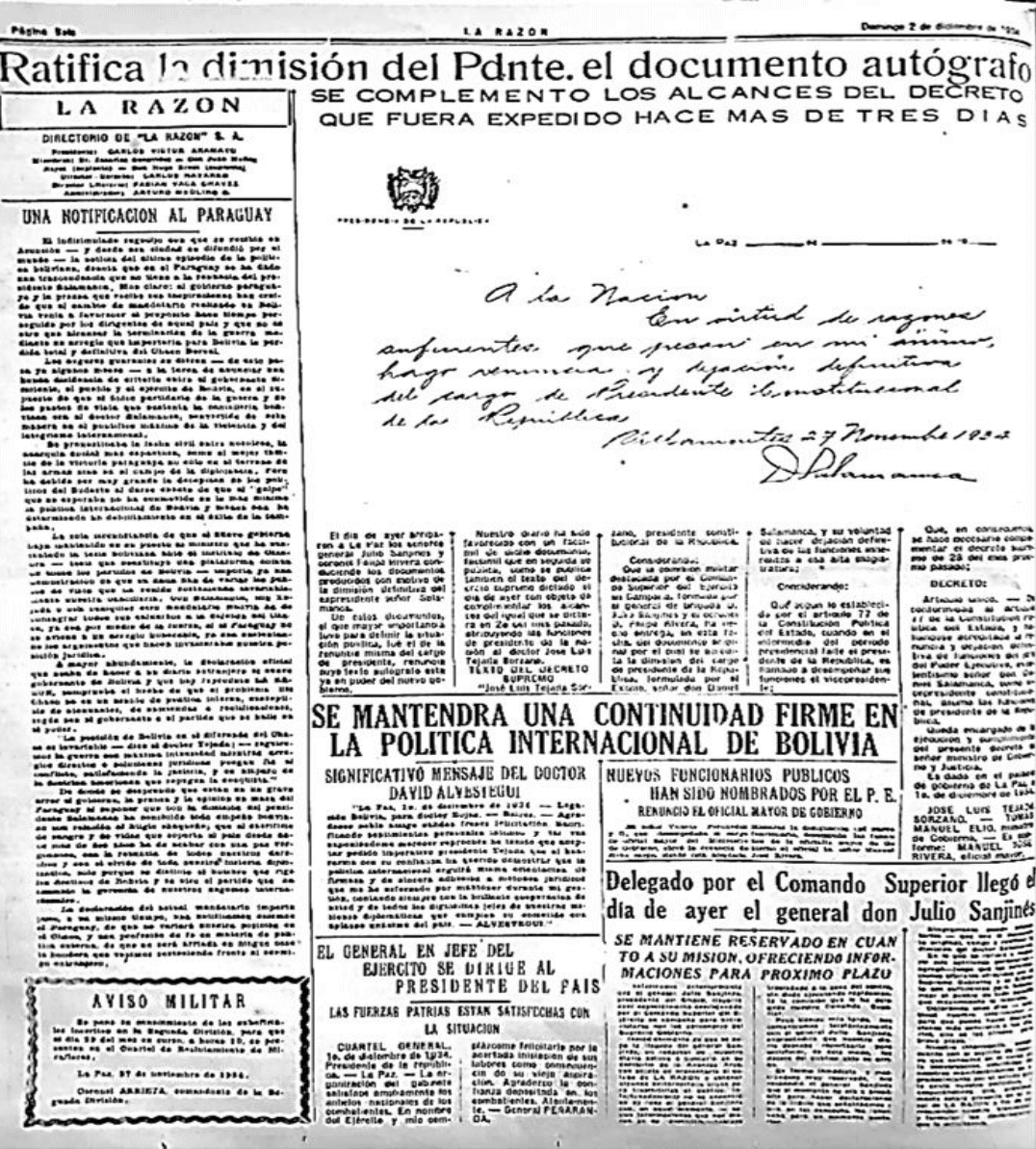
The resignation of President Salamanca, reported by the newspaper La Razón, 2 December 1934.

By the end of the meeting, Peñaranda's dismissal was deemed an "outrage against the entire army" and the high command determined to depose Salamanca the following day. The authors of the coup included three generals: Enrique Peñaranda, Julio Sanjinés, and Adalid Tejada; seven colonels: Felipe M. Rivera, Ángel Rodríguez, Enrique Frías, Victorino Gutiérrez, Miguel Alaiza, Néstor Montes, and Heriberto Ariñez; six lieutenant colonels: Jorge Jordán, Víctor E. Serrano, Alfredo Santalla, Enrique Vidaurre, Luis Añez, and Julio Díaz Arguedas; as well as Germán Busch, Raúl Tardío, and Lieutenant Roberto Ramallo. Notably absent was Toro who did not participate in either the planning nor execution of the coup.

In a tragic twist, Peñaranda himself later wrote that "[...] I did not intend to remain in the position of general-in-chief; I would have resigned if it had not been for the insistence of the chiefs and officers that I stay". He added: "The president could have relieved me of my position from La Paz; I would have immediately complied with this order, asking only that command of the 'Loa' regiment be retained from me".

=== Putsch at the Staudt house ===
At dawn on 27 November, Rivera directed that three trucks be brought in carrying troops from the 4th Artillery Group. Meanwhile, two artillery pieces were set up, set to fire on the Staudt house in which the president was residing. Troops under the command of Busch surrounded the premises with machine guns placed in the garden, pointing inwards through the windows. Busch was greeted at the front door by Lanza and Canelas, the latter of whom was still in pajamas. Lanza recounts that "with appropriate phrases I made some reflections to Major Busch, ordering him to gather his troops and bring them into the premises we were occupying. The major bowed his head and after a little hesitation he obeyed the order".

Faced with the fait accompli, Salamanca dictated his letter of resignation to Ugarte. It read: "To the nation: By virtue of inherent reasons that weigh on my mind, I resign and definitively abandon the position of Constitutional President of the Republic". The addition of "definitively abandon" to the letter was a phrase specifically dictated by the conspirators.

== Aftermath ==
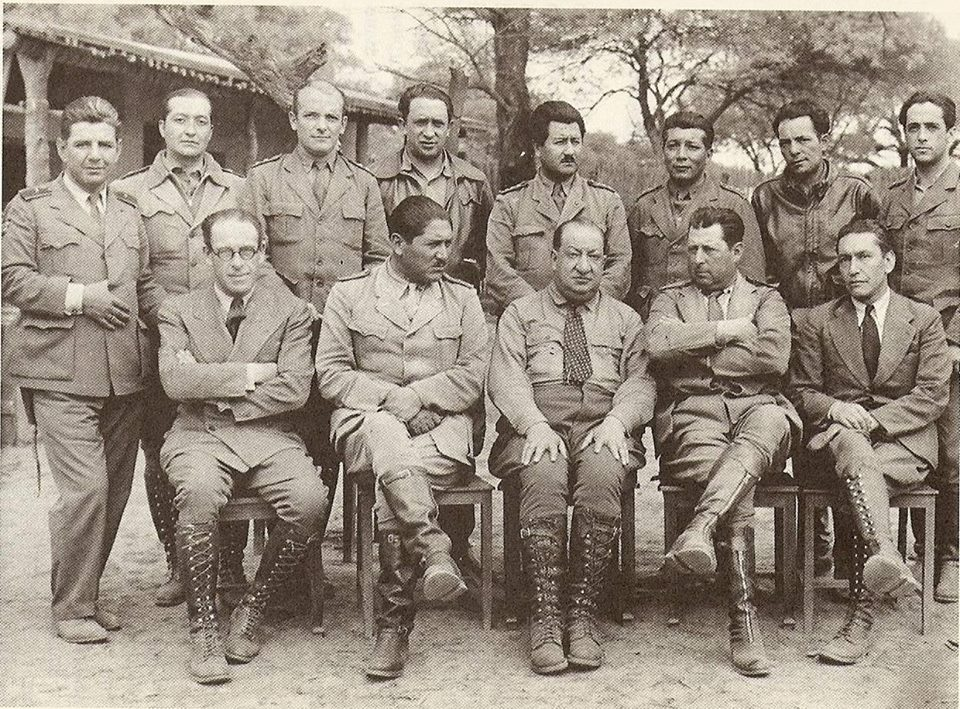
President Tejada Sorzano seated with Peñaranda and other officers.

Soon after Salamanca's deposition, the conspirators Peñaranda, Sanjinés, Rivera, Rodríguez, and Busch, joined by 14 other officers, deliberated on how to take power while maintaining a veneer of legality. The fear of non-recognition of the new government by neighbouring nations, in whose hands peace negotiations were, was a factor taken into account. After debating and discussing all viable options, it was ultimately decided that Vice President José Luis Tejada Sorzano would be allowed to assume office, with the inclusion of three military ministers in his cabinet.

On 28 November, Tejada Sorzano assumed office as acting president. On 1 December, a Military Commission appointed by the high command made up of General Julio Sanjinés and Colonel Felipe M. Rivera arrived in La Paz and delivered the original document containing Salamanca's resignation, after which Article 77 of the Constitution was officially enacted and Tejada Sorzano was named Constitutional President of the Republic.

It is notable that the conspiracy to overthrow Salamanca was "not partisan and, secondly, there was no leader guiding the conspiracy. The transitory result was not the seizure of power, but the recognition of a constitutional succession". Nevertheless, the coup was a mortal wound to the traditional political system which had governed for decades and set the stage for its eventual downfall in 1936 and its permanent dissolution following the 1952 National Revolution.
