= First Battle of Herrera =

First battle of Herrera
- Part of the Chaco War
Date	14-26 January 1933
Location	Gran Chaco
Result	Paraguayan victory

Belligerents
Bolivia	Paraguay

Commanders and leaders
Hans Kundt; Filiberto Osorio; Roberto Schnor	José Félix Estigarribia; Paulino Antola

Strength
First attack: 575 men; Second attack: 2400 men; 4 guns	1000 men

Casualties and losses
1100 casualties	Unknown

The First Battle of Herrera took place in January 1933 during the Chaco War between Bolivia and Paraguay. It was a Bolivian attempt, over nearly two weeks, to take Fort Herrera from its Paraguayan defenders, ending in victory for the latter and heavy casualties to the former.

== Background and engagement ==
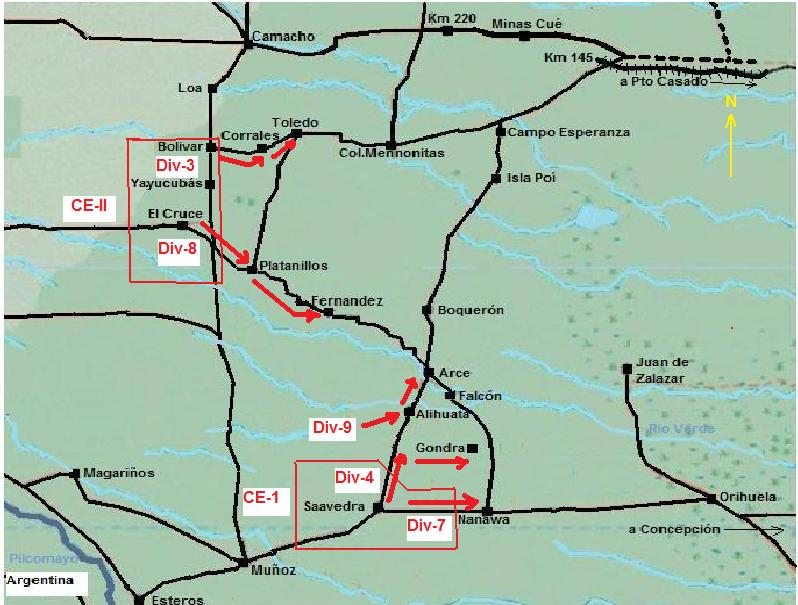
Bolivian advances in progress between January and March of 1933.

The Bolivian Army's 8th Division had, in December 1932, easily dislodged Fort Platanillos' defenders and taken it; this fort had been the main communications hub between various Bolivian forts which had, since the beginning of hostilities, been taken by Paraguay. From this new position, they marched towards Fort Herrera (formerly Fort Fernández), another fortification to their southeast. It was defended by a regiment, Infantry Regiment No. 1 "Dos de Mayo" under Major Paulino Antola, circa 1000 men strong. Ultimately, the Bolivian force aimed to reach Fort Francia (formerly Fort Arce), the Paraguayan headquarters, further southeast.

On 14 January 1933, parts of the 8th Division advanced towards the fort: around 575 men in two regiments and a cavalry squadron under Colonel Roberto Schnor. The Bolivian assumption was that the fort was defended by no more than 200 men. On 20 January the Bolivian force reached the fort and made an uncoordinated frontal attack, which failed, producing circa 300 casualties. No reserves were held in support to the attack, which was made hurriedly in order to aid the main attack on Fort Nanawa.

Two days later, the Bolivian forces were reinforced by other units from the 8th Division, reaching a total of 2400 men and 4 guns. They then attacked the fort again, with similar results, and over both attacks suffered around 1100 casualties. They retreated to a position 10 km ahead of Fort Platanillos, hurried by a Paraguayan attack to the nearby Fort Corrales.

The Bolivian Army would, in much greater force, attempt to capture the fort two other times in 1933, once in March and again in May, with similar results.
