= Third Battle of Herrera =

- Part of the Chaco War
Date	18 May-1 June 1933
Location	Gran Chaco
Result	Paraguayan victory

Belligerents
Bolivia	Paraguay

Commanders and leaders
Hans Kundt; Felipe Arrieta	José Félix Estigarribia; Paulino Antola

Strength
2000 men	1200 men

Casualties and losses
556 dead 314 wounded	Unknown

The Third Battle of Herrera took place in late May and early June 1933 during the Chaco War between Bolivia and Paraguay. After two failed attempts by Bolivian forces at taking Fort Herrera, they assaulted it a third time in even greater force, but once again were defeated by the defenders.

== Background and engagement ==
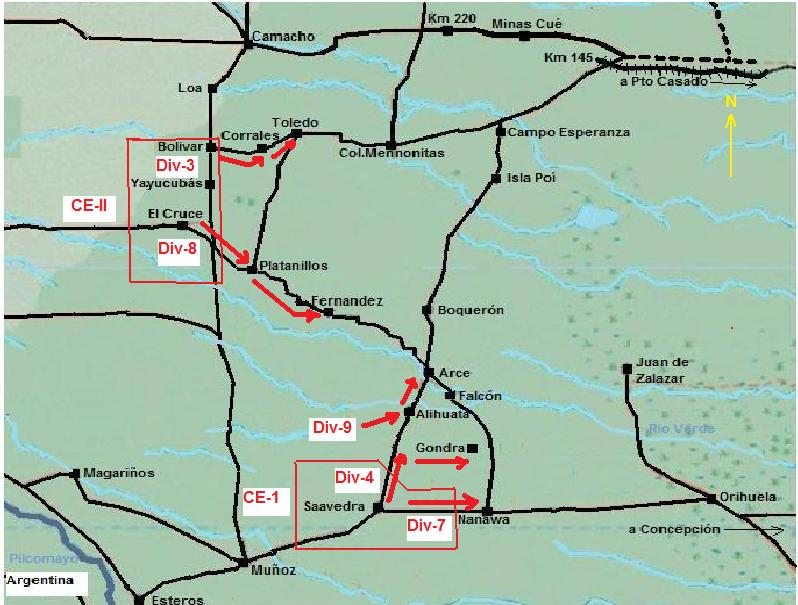
Bolivian advances in progress between January and March 1933.

Ever since Bolivian-built Forts Francia (formerly Fort Arce) and Herrera (formerly Fort Fernández) had been taken by Paraguayan forces in 1932, they had represented a strong obstacle in the center of the front. Fort Herrera should be taken in order for Fort Francia to be recaptured with more ease, which had made the Bolivian 8th Division attempt to capture it twice already over 1933, the first time in January and the second in March. Both of these attempts were frontal attacks on the strong Paraguayan positions, ending in heavy casualties for the Bolivians.

On May 10, 1933, the 8th Division was once again ordered to march against Fort Herrera, reaching it 8 days later. Having, for the first time, mortar support (by 81mm pieces), they still ended up being unable to advance in face of Paraguayan fire. Bolivian command then ordered a force of 3 regiments under Lieutenant Colonel Felipe Arrieta (circa 1000 men originally, but already having losses from another operation) to strike the fort from the east, amidst an advance by their 9th Division on Fort Francia from the recently captured Fort Alihuatá. Both advances were, however, halted by the Paraguayan forces, Arrieta's force in particular being countered by only 200 men.

The 8th Division again attacked the fort on 27 May to draw away the attention of the defenders, allowing Arrieta's troops to close into the fort by 30 May. Their unprovisioned march had them exhausted, however, so that when, on 1 June, they and the 8th Division made their final attack, they were repulsed. On their retreat to Fort Platanillos, they were harassed by Paraguayan bombers, leaving 556 dead on the field, and having suffered more than 300 wounded; Marshal Estigarribia claims that the Bolivians had 1000 dead. The 8th Division had been reduced to little more than a battalion, as, from its original strength of 2000 men, only 539 were able combatants afterwards. Hans Kundt, overall commander of the Bolivian forces in the Chaco, blamed the 8th Division's command for the defeat; they had left no reserves for the attack, sat too far away from it, and left no outposts on their flanks.

Fort Herrera would be attacked again in August 1933, on a move meant to deflect Paraguayan attention from other parts of the front.
