= Battle of Yrendagüé =

- Part of the Chaco War
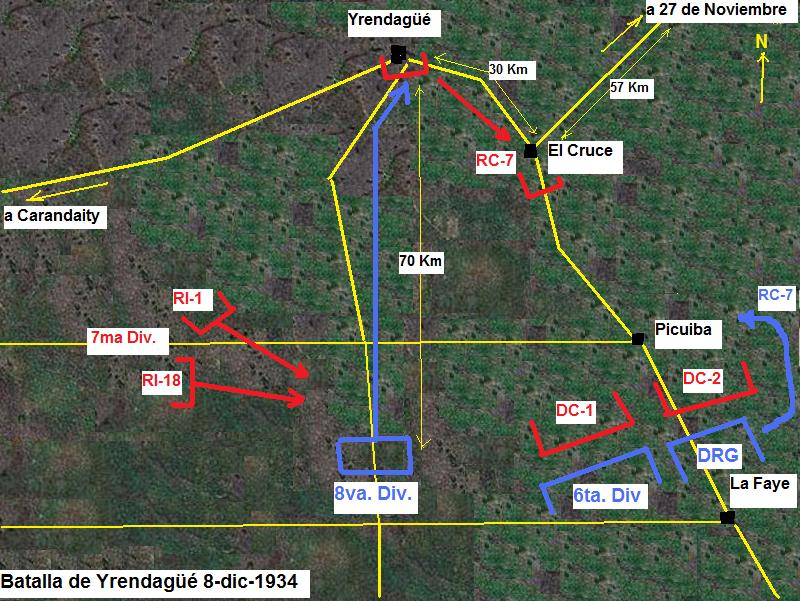
- Map of the zone where the battle took place. Red: Bolivian forces. Blue: Paraguayan forces.
Date	5–8 December 1934
Location	Gran Chaco
Result	Paraguayan victory

Belligerents
Bolivia	Paraguay

Commanders and leaders
Enrique Peñaranda; David Toro	José Félix Estigarribia; Rafael Franco; Eugenio Garay

Strength
13000 men	6000 men

Casualties and losses
3300 captured 3000-10000 dead or missing	Light

The Battle of Yrendagüé was fought amidst the Chaco War between Bolivia and Paraguay, in early December 1934. A Paraguayan division marched through the gap in the lines between two Bolivian divisions and captured the Bolivian Cavalry Corps' main water source, Fort Yrendagüé, 70 km away from the front. This left the whole Cavalry Corps, 12,000 men, without any viable water sources, and ultimately that unit disintegrated, most of its men being either captured by Paraguayan forces or dying of thirst in the Chaco.

== Background ==
On 11 November 1934, a day after the Battle of El Carmen started, the Bolivian Cavalry Corps captured Fort Yrendagüé from the Paraguayan 2nd Corps defending it. The Cavalry Corps, under Colonel David Toro, was the Bolivian Army's best equipped unit, 12,000 men strong, and had been, since September 1934, pushing in the north of the Chaco after the smaller 2nd Corps under Colonel Rafael Franco. They had, in October 1934 captured an important water source at Yrendagüé, a crucial issue to sustaining further offensive operations in the Chaco.

In El Carmen, after a week of maneuvering, the bulk of the Bolivian Reserve Corps, two divisions, was encircled and made to surrender. This in turn forced Fort Ballivián's defenders, in the southern axis of the front, to withdraw towards Villamontes, in the foothills of the Andes, and so the Cavalry Corps was the only active part of the Bolivian Army engaging in offensive operations in the Chaco proper.

After capturing Yrendagüé, the Cavalry Corps acquired momentum, still. Toro, who had important political influence over the Bolivian Army's command, received additional reinforcements in order to deepen his offensive into the Chaco. He had his two cavalry divisions pushing the Paraguayan forces in the Picuiba-La Faye region, while the 7th Division marched on a wide arc around these positions in order to encircle them. The speed of the advance meant that his command post was 160 km away from where the battles were taking place. Toro was warned and even ordered by Bolivian command to stop and aid in the defense of Villamontes, but these orders went unheeded.

The Paraguayan 2nd Corps, facing them, was only 3,500 men strong at this point. It had lost one of its divisions, the 8th, to the offensive operations in El Carmen. José Felix Estigarribia, commander-in-chief of the Paraguayan forces in the Chaco, had given it the task of drawing the Cavalry Corps deeper into the desert, and not necessarily holding any position in particular. It had already been encircled by Bolivian forces and broken through these at times. This had it making a fighting withdrawal towards Picuiba, in a particularly inhospitable region.

Picuiba fell on 20 November after its defenders inflicted heavy casualties on the Bolivian attackers. Toro maintained that if he could beat the 2nd Corps in battle, there would be nothing in his way towards attacking the Paraguayan forces facing Villamontes from their rear and destroying them.

After Picuiba, the 2nd Corps was reinforced by the return of the 8th Division, however, and was now 6,000 men strong. The 8th had rested for a week after El Carmen and was armed with captured Bolivian equipment, and so was in prime fighting condition. The Corps' other two divisions, the 6th and General Reserve Division, were not; they were tired from their long fighting retreat against the superior Cavalry Corps. On December 4, knowing that that force would soon resume their attack and try to capture La Faye, Rafael Franco met with the 8th Division's commander, Eugenio Garay, and ordered him to engage on an offensive operation. He should march his division to the gap between two Bolivian divisions and wade undetected through 70 km of desert to recapture Fort Yrendagüé, something which would leave the whole Cavalry Corps without viable water sources in the middle of a desert, allowing for their destruction.

== Engagement ==
On the morning of 5 December 1934, the Paraguayan 8th Division started to march towards its first objective, Alvarenga trail, a dirt road cut from the brush deep in the Chaco. The division, three regiments strong, had at its head the elite Infantry Regiment "Batallón 40" led by the division's commander, Eugenio Garay, nearly 60 years old.

By the next morning, the force was already short on water. They stopped their march to request resupply, and resumed only by nightfall, avoiding the sun. In order to be successful, they had to reach Yrendagüé the next morning, or they would die of thirst. This delay ended up being fundamental for the operation's success, still, for it meant they missed the Bolivian 7th Division marching out of Yrendagüé in its flanking maneuver against the 2nd Corps. Had both forces met, it would have meant the loss of the element of surprise for the Paraguayan operation.

On the morning of 7 December, the advance reached its final phase. The ground transitioned from the typical hard and dry soil typical of the Chaco to short hills made of thick sand, where the soldiers' legs could sink down some, making walking hard. To this point, the absence of Bolivian forces meant they still retained the element of surprise. Their first engagement was at 16:00, when two trucks with food and water bound to the Bolivian 7th Division were captured. The difficulty of the march, the thirst and the heat continued to imperil them, and so Garay famously said:

Soldiers from Battalón 40, I ask you to resist this march for two more hours, so that we may die together in Yrendagüé. (Note: Translated from the original Spanish, which reads: "Soldados del Batallón 40: os pido que resistáis dos horas más esta marcha, para ir a morir juntos en Yrendagué.")

The rest of the 2nd Corps became active on the same day. Franco had two regiments of his force manoeuvre around the left of the Bolivian 2nd Cavalry Division to draw its attention, and had patrols posted over the front to watch for any activity which might indicate the 8th Division had been spotted. Toro, assuming this activity was a reconnaissance in force, had a regiment posted to the rear of his cavalry divisions in order to forestall any possible encircling actions. Toro was in the habit of ordering subordinate units down to the company level to specific actions.

At 21:45, Bolivian patrols detected, far away from Yrendagüé, the footsteps of the 8th Division, but judged them to be a battalion-sized force, and set up an ambush for when they would return to Paraguayan lines. After the battle, Toro would complain that the 18th Regiment's (whose troops spotted the footsteps) officers did not report this adequately, though Bolivian headquarters were made aware of it; the 18th's commander, Lieutenant Colonel Ayoroa, believed the Paraguayan force was trying to surround a particular regiment of the 1st Cavalry Division which was moving to support the 7th Division's advance.

At 03:00 on 8 December, the 8th Division suddenly came out of the brush into a clearing near Yrendagüé, capturing all the Cavalry Corps' medical staff and its wounded. Bolivian command was made aware of this, but they still believed the Paraguayan force to be battalion-sized; some of these reports were intercepted by Garay's force, letting it know it still retained some of the element of surprise. Trucks were sent towards a regiment of one of the cavalry divisions to pick it up and ferry it to Yrendagüé to defend it from the Paraguayans, but these only had the capacity for a small amount of men.

Foreseeing that Yrendagüé might be captured, an hour later a withdrawal was ordered to the two cavalry divisions facing La Faye, the Cavalry Corps' main force, in order to shorten communication and supply lines. The 7th Division was to revert its march and, together with the 1st Cavalry Division, engage the Paraguayan force at its rear, and the 2nd Cavalry Division should delay the rest of the 2nd Corps. The regiment nearest to Yrendagüé was ordered to march back there, but it would be unable to do so, lacking trucks and water.

=== Capture of Yrendagüé ===
Fort Yrendagüé was defended by 130 to 400 men, many of them walking wounded. An assault was quickly ordered upon arrival, and, when the Paraguayan troops were within 100 meters of the fort, most Bolivians either surrendered or fled. Though the position was counterattacked various times during that day and night, with the use of artillery, the 8th Division held.

Bolivian forces in the region had no more water supply. Telephone lines and roads from Toro's command post at Carandaity and the Cavalry Corps' troops were cut.

=== Bolivian withdrawal ===
The Bolivian Cavalry Corps' retreat started at 06:00 on 8 December; they destroyed Fort Picuíba, their advance position. The garrison at Picuiba, and many other soldiers had not received any water rations in the last 24 hours, and the rumour that Paraguayan forces had captured the wells at Yrendagüé spread fast, making the retreat disorderly. The column would have to retreat for 30 km through sandy and dusty terrain, in extreme temperatures and very often with empty canteens.

The Paraguayan 2nd Corps soon started to press the retreating Bolivians. By 17:00, only a small part of the Bolivian army had reached their first checkpoint at El Cruce, most of them weaponless, out of ammunition, exhausted and with signs of sunstroke. The divisional commanders marched out of Carandaity towards El Cruce, while Toro remained, aiming to communicate from headquarters with the field through air mail. Supplies were promised to forces in the field from Fort 27 de Noviembre, much further away.

In the field, officers present ordered a continuation of the withdrawal from El Cruce to 27 de Noviembre, 57 km away, a decision that Toro in headquarters tried to countermand; the truth was that there weren't enough supplies in 27 de Noviembre for the whole Cavalry Corps, and he wanted these divisions to take back Yrendagüé. Still, the withdrawal continued towards that position, for the Bolivians were too tired and undersupplied to attack. The advance force of the Paraguayan pursuers, the 2nd Sappers Battalion, started forwards towards that fort from Picuiba on trucks on 05:00 of December 10. Two hours later, they reached the first Bolivian troops on the retreat, on no condition to offer any resistance. Then they rode through hundreds of Bolivians who begged for water, amidst burned down trucks and dead or dying soldiers who barred their way forward, and had to step down from their trucks.

This is considered to be the "most ghastly amongst many tragic episodes of the Chaco War" by René de la Pedraja. Bolivian soldiers, having given up the hope of any rescue or resupply, "started to fall behind and huddled under trees trying to find shade from the sun's furious rays. Others continued to laboriously drag themselves forward until they collapsed never to rise again. The lucky ones who had kept their rifles committed suicide in desperation. As in the battle of El Carmen, others died in an attempt to dig out juicy roots deep in the sands, while other men buried themselves in the sand before committing suicide." Most officers withdrew on trucks early on. David Zook deems it, accordingly, the "most horrible spectacle of the Chaco War."

On 11 December, Paraguayan cavalry captured 27 de Noviembre, joining forces with the Paraguayan 14th Infantry Regiment "Cerro Corá" which had marched from Fort Ingavi. They then continued to pursue the Bolivian forces which now withdrew to the west, to the new defensive line on the Parapetí River. Out of the entire Cavalry Corps only the 7th Division managed to withdraw in order. Circa half of the Corps died of thirst, went missing or were captured. Most of their weapons were lost on the retreat and much of the Paraguayan Army updated its equipment after the battle.

On 14 December, Bolivian airplanes dropped leaflets on Picuiba, which mistakenly was believed as still held by their forces. On these leaflets, were an order dictated by Toro 5 days earlier:

No consideration must be given to the fatigue of the troops since it is necessary to exert them to the utmost of their possibilities. One or two days of effort or sacrifice will not annihilate them. The enemy troops give us more than a sufficient example, in this respect, demonstrating to us that it is possible to live even months without any means. Yesterday they made a raid of nearly 40 kilometers advancing by path and on foot in order to attack Yrendagüé with the utmost audacity and energy.

== Aftermath ==
Toro accused his underlings of not respecting his orders during the withdrawal, both in his report to Bolivian command, and in his memoirs after the war.

Differently from what had happened in El Carmen, where Bolivian public opinion was not made aware of their troops' suffering due to their near-complete encirclement and surrender, in this battle many thousands managed to escape and tell tales of their and their comrades' suffering on the retreat. The real conditions in the Chaco and its deserts were made known to the wider public, deeply impacting morale on the home front.

Yrendagüé meant that there were no more challenges to Paraguayan superiority in the Chaco itself; after the Cavalry Corps' withdrawal, Bolivia would hold little land in it besides some jungle in its very north. As peace talks continued at a slow pace, however, Paraguayan forces would keep advancing and trying to secure a foothold in the Andes, and maybe capture some of the Bolivian oil wells in them. Santa Cruz de la Sierra, rebellious as ever against La Paz, provided another, if more remote, target for the next Paraguayan advances. Over the following months, Bolivia would rebuild its army for the third time, however, after a general mobilization. Paraguay had long ago run out of manpower.
