= 1940 Paraguayan constitutional referendum =

A constitutional referendum was held in Paraguay on 4 August 1940. It saw voters approve the new constitution.

== Background ==
In 1939, amid a political stalemate, President José Félix Estigarribia dissolved Congress and assumed "temporary" dictatorial powers. The following year, he issued a new constitution. The key institution was a "strong, but not despotic" president who was vested with sweeping powers to suspend civil liberties and take actions that he deemed necessary for the good of the state. The Senate was abolished and the Chamber of Representatives limited in power. A new, corporatist-inspired Council of State was created to represent interests in business, farmers, bankers, the military, and the Roman Catholic Church.

== Results ==
Choice	Votes	%
For		92.4
Against		7.6
Total		
Registered voters/turnout		80
Source: Direct Democracy
