= Battle of Cañada Strongest =

1934 battle of the Chaco War

- Part of the Chaco War
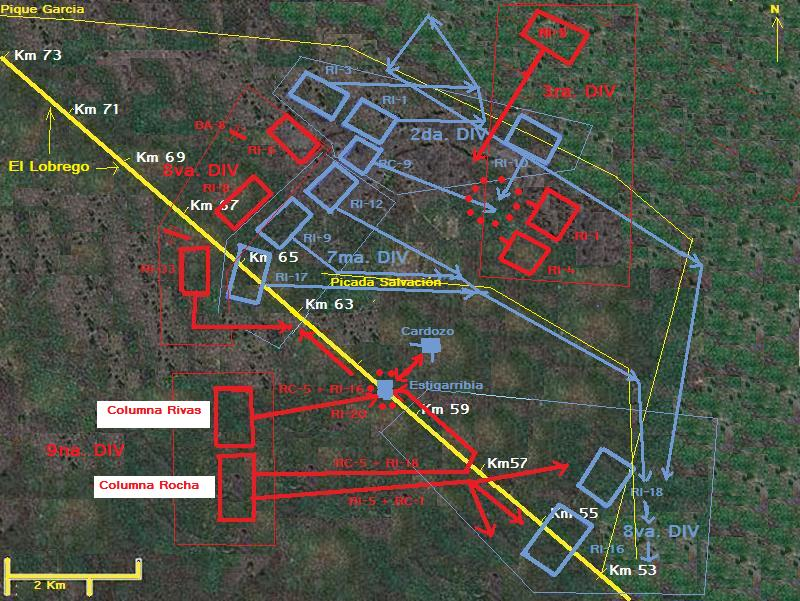
- Map of the battle
Date	May 10–25, 1934
Location	Gran Chaco 22.177778°S 61.918056°W
Result	Bolivian victory

Belligerents
Bolivia	Paraguay

Commanders and leaders
(Bolivia) Enrique Peñaranda	(Paraguay) José Félix Estigarribia

Strength
4 divisions	2 divisions

Casualties and losses
Minimal	400 dead; 1500 prisoners
- Location within Paraguay Battle of Cañada Strongest (South America) Battle of Cañada Strongest (America)

The Battle of Cañada Strongest was a major military action from May 10 to May 25, 1934 during the Chaco War, in which Paraguayan forces were ambushed and defeated by three Bolivian divisions. The engagement is considered the greatest victory of the Bolivian army during the war.

The battle actually took place some 60 km southwest of Cañada Strongest, near a dried riverbed called Cañada Esperanza. The battle began as a Paraguayan attempt to outflank and eventually conquer Fort Ballivian, a large stronghold that was the keystone of Bolivian defenses along the border with Argentina.

Paraguayan forces began to open a new trail in the dry subtropical forests of the Chaco but were discovered by Bolivian aerial reconnaissance. The Paraguayan troops, unaware of having been discovered, were encircled by Bolivian forces who had sneaked up on the path and were waiting for a substantial number of Paraguayan troops to enter the pathway before they ambushed them. A 250-man Paraguayan detachment sent in to monitor the Bolivian movements was also surrounded and eventually captured on May 25 along Lóbrego Path, a route between the first Paraguayan lines and Cañada Esperanza.

The Bolivian army took 1,500 prisoners and a good amount of weaponry, trucks and supplies, while almost 400 Paraguayan soldiers were killed. An entire Paraguayan division, however, managed to slip away, along with some scattered units.

== Sources ==
- Farcau, Bruce W. (1996): The Chaco War: Bolivia and Paraguay, 1932-1935, Greenwood Publishing Group, pp. 177–182. ISBN 0-275-95218-5
- Robert L. Schein. (2003): Latin America's Wars: The age of the professional soldier, 1900-2001, p. 98.
