= 1934 Bolivian general election =

General elections were held in Bolivia on 11 November 1934, electing both a new President of the Republic and a new National Congress, but the results were later nullified. The terms of Senators and Deputies (elected in 1933) then in office were prorogued to 5 August 1936, by Act of National Congress on 4 August 1935.

== Results ==
=== President ===
Candidate	Running mate	Party	Votes	%
Franz Tamayo	Rafael de Ugarte	Genuine Republican Party	9,642	59.21
Juan María Zalles	Bernardo Navajas Trigo	Liberal Party	6,642	40.79
Total			16,284	100.00
Source: Mesa
