= Battle of El Carmen =

- Part of the Chaco War
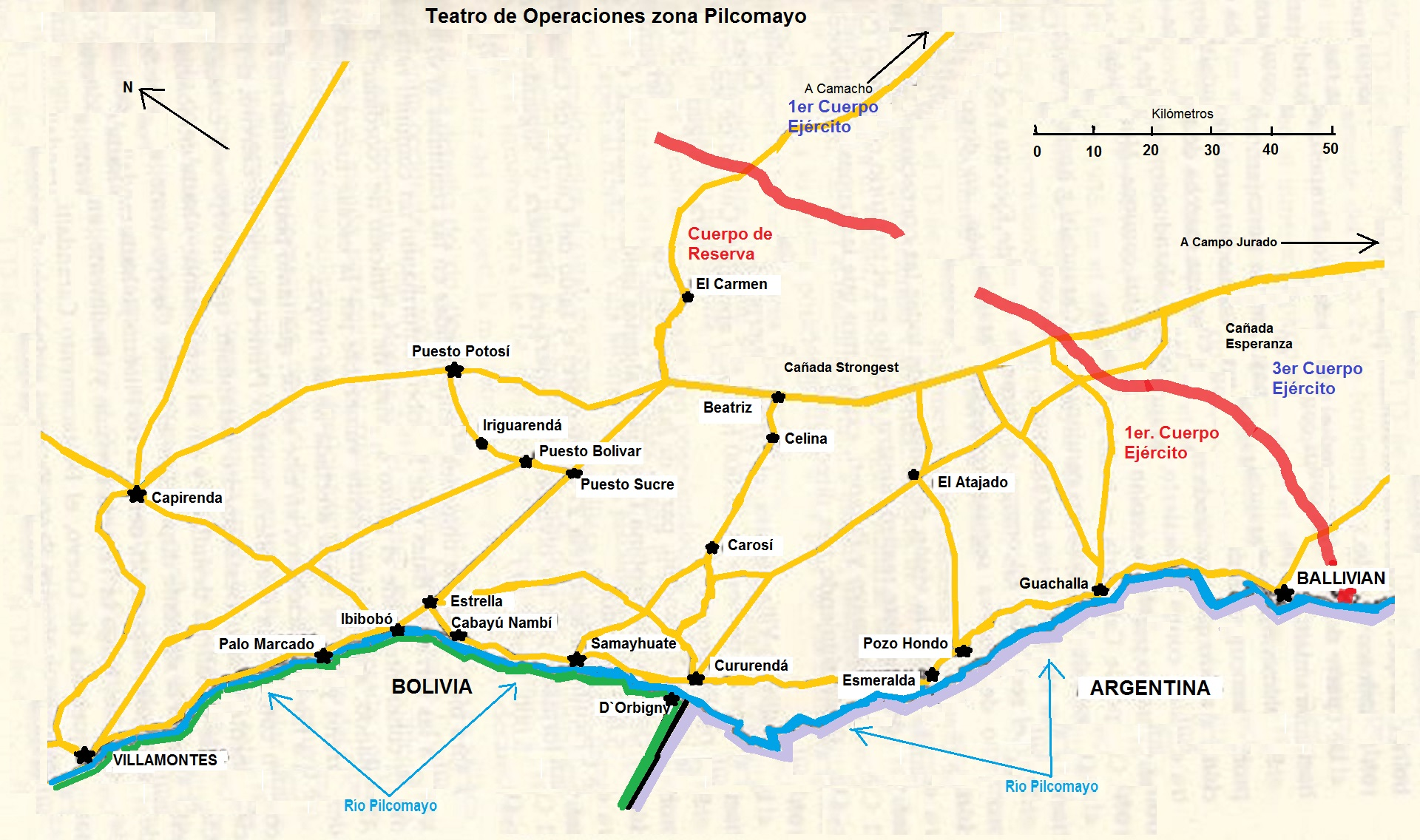
- Map of the zone where the battle took place. Red: Bolivian defensive lines. Blue: Paraguayan forces.
Date	10–16 November 1934
Location	Gran Chaco
Result	Paraguayan victory

Belligerents
Bolivia	Paraguay

Commanders and leaders
Enrique Peñaranda; Oscar Moscoso	José Félix Estigarribia; Carlos Fernández

Strength
11000 men	4500 men

Casualties and losses
10000 dead, wounded or captured 12 guns captured	"less than 100 casualties"

The Battle of El Carmen was an engagement of the Chaco War between Bolivia and Paraguay which took place in November 1934. It was one of the largest battles of the war and a decisive Paraguayan victory, where a large Bolivian force was surrounded in a pincer movement and made to surrender, contributing decisively to later Paraguayan advances towards the foothills of the Andes.

== Background ==
Bolivian defenses, ever since the defeat at Campo Vía in December 1933, had been centered around Fort Ballivián, deep in the Chaco. Most forces in the Bolivian Army were concentrated there, something which immobilized them and made offensive operations in other sectors of the front difficult; this in turn lessened the effect of the Bolivian superiority in numbers. Bolivian president Daniel Salamanca feared the political effects of abandoning Ballivián, a symbol of Bolivian presence in the Chaco, but also recognized that the fort was a burden from a military point of view. Meanwhile, Paraguayan commander-in-chief José Felix Estigarribia knew the fort would eventually be abandoned, but encouraged offensive operations in other points of the front while it wasn't.

On 6 October 1934, Estigarribia met Paraguayan President Eusebio Ayala at the army's headquarters in Camacho, where they agreed upon a limited offensive operation upon Cañada (Note: Cañada comes from "cañadón", a type of river valley typical of the Chaco.) El Carmen, as the military balance between both countries was bound to worsen otherwise.

In early November 1934 the Bolivian forces were deployed in a fashion Estigarribia judged favourable for his plans, where besides the 18,000 men stuck in Ballivián to the south, there were David Toro and Bernardino Bilbao Rioja's Cavalry Corps (circa 20,000 men) giving chase to Rafael Franco's 2nd Corps (less than 5,000 men) in the northwest, and a weak center around Cañada El Carmen manned by Oscar Moscoso's Reserve Corps, made up by two divisions, the 1st and the 2nd Reserve Divisions, 8,000 men in total. Their original assignment was to, besides holding their position, threaten the Paraguayan 2nd Corps' supply lines. Given this, Estigarribia planned to break through the Bolivian center, encircle and destroy it, and then, with the enemy army split in two, destroy each half in detail, or at least force them to retreat.

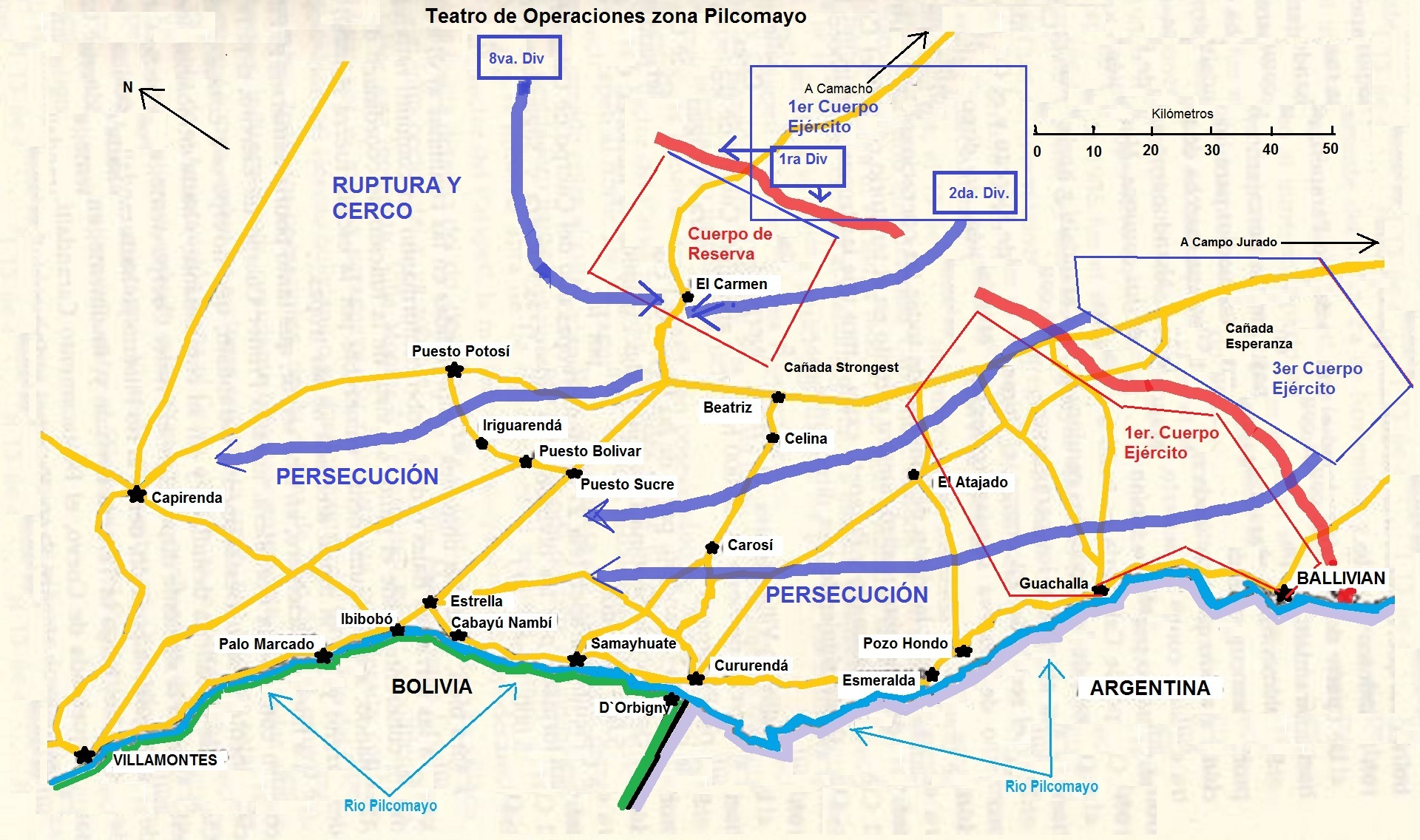
Estigarribia's operational plan: breakout through El Carmen and pursuit. Red: Bolivian forces. Blue: Paraguayan forces.

Before the offensive began, Estigarribia ordered Colonel Carlos Fernández, commander of the Paraguayan 1st Corps, to reconnoiter the Bolivian 1st Reserve Division's position, and took the 8th Division under Eugenio Garay from Rafael Franco's command; it was moved to the north of El Carmen and ordered to patrol aggressively to the rear of El Carmen, and together both forces discovered a 60 km gap in Bolivian lines. Bolivian command hoped the pressure from the Cavalry Corps' advance in the northeast would keep the Paraguayans from advancing in the center, and believed forces facing the Reserve Corps to be weak.

== Engagement ==
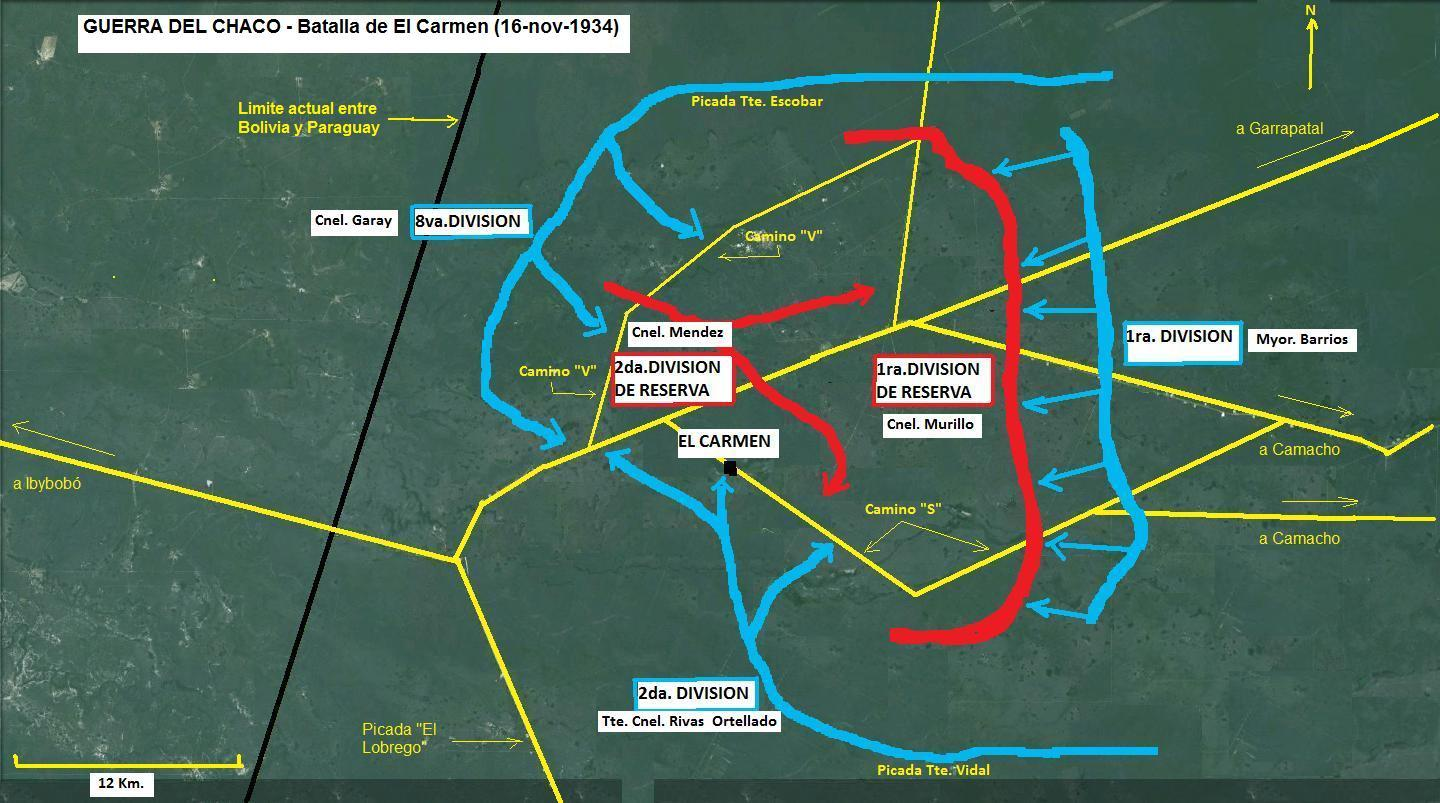
Situation as of 16 November 1934. Red: Bolivian forces. Blue: Paraguayan forces.

In November 10, the Paraguayan 1st Division attacked the Bolivian 1st Reserve Division on a wide front. Simultaneously, the Paraguayan 8th Division started a flanking movement to its north; two days later, they destroyed an enemy battalion caught unaware, and ambushed a convoy riding towards the 1st Res. Div., killing the divisional chief of staff and capturing important documents containing the disposition of the division's forces and the paths cut through the Chaco between them. These and other engagements revealed to Bolivian command that an enveloping movement was in progress against the 1st Res. Div., and they moved the 2nd Res. Div. to counter it, a move that was read by Paraguayan command as a retreat, as they had only one spotter plane and it saw large amounts of trucks going to and from the Bolivian position. The 2nd Res. Div. punched through the Paraguayan forces in its way and joined the 1st at the right moment in order to be trapped by the Paraguayan encirclement.

Finally, the Paraguayan 2nd Division had a day earlier started to march on the left of the Bolivian position, a maneuver similar to the one that had gotten it encircled during the Battle of Cañada Strongest; a mistake made with their maps made them march directly on Cañada El Carmen, which they captured on 15 November, taking the 1st Res. Div.'s commander's aide prisoner; the commander himself, Colonel Murillo, fled in haste and left behind his documents and personal belongings.

On November 16, the Paraguayan 8th and 2nd Divisions met; they had encircled the entire enemy force in the center of the front. After some attempts to break out, lacking supplies and water, Bolivian soldiers began to surrender in the thousands. There were no reserves to break them out, given that they were the army's reserves; on November 17 some troops were ordered to move from Fort Ballivián to El Carmen, but it was too late. The small area the Bolivians were in led to confusion amongst their various regiments and eventually both divisional commands were captured, including Colonel Murillo; Colonel Mendez, commander of the 2nd. Res. Div., was killed early on in the battle. The encirclement had large gaps, so that some 2,000 Bolivian troops managed to escape, but two divisions were still destroyed, and a large amount of weapons and supplies was captured.

== Aftermath ==
For the price of 100 casualties, the Paraguayan Army had captured nearly 7000 Bolivian troops with all their weapons, trucks, guns and supplies. They were getting ready to attack Franco's 2nd Corps from the west, and sorely needed additional fuel and other matters of war. Bolivian troops, when captured in the pocket, usually had ran out of water, and their thirst strained Paraguayan logistics.

On 16 November, Bolivian commander-in-chief Enrique Peñaranda ordered that Fort Ballivián's 18,000 defenders abandon it, fearing they might get encircled, pressed up against the Argentine border. On the next day the fort was occupied by Paraguayan forces, which started to pursue the retreating defenders. Their numbers were eroded by desertion to Argentina, and most of them did not make it back to the new Bolivian lines.

A week after the encirclement, the Paraguayan 8th Division returned to Franco's command, armed with new Bolivian equipment and rested, in order to help engage one of the halves of the Bolivian Army left after the battle.

The massive defeat convinced President Salamanca that a change in the command of the Army was necessary. He moved to demand a resignation from General Peñaranda, something that would lead directly to the president being toppled in the 1934 Bolivian coup d'état.

== Order of battle of the Bolivian Army ==
The newly formed Reserve Corps was the only Bolivian unit involved in this battle. Under it, were the 1st and 2nd Reserve Divisions.

=== Headquarters ===
Commander, Reserve Corps - Colonel Oscar Moscoso

=== 1st Reserve Division ===
Commander – Colonel Zacarías Murillo

- Infantry Regiment no. 6 Campos
- Infantry Regiment no. 12 Manchego
- Infantry Regiment no. 40 Chiquitos
- Divisional Cavalry Squadron

=== 2nd Reserve Division ===
Commander – Colonel Walter Méndez

- Infantry Regiment no. 16 Beni
- Infantry Regiment no. 31 Rocha
- Infantry Regiment no. 50 Murgia

=== Independent units ===
- Corps Staff
- Corps Artillery Group
- Sappers Battalion
- Supply Regiment

== Order of battle of the Paraguayan Army ==
The Paraguayan 1st Corps was reinforced by the 8th Division from the 2nd Corps for the offensive.

=== Headquarters ===
Commander, 1st Corps - Colonel Carlos Fernández

=== 1st Division ===
Commander – Major Juan Barrios

- Infantry Regiment no. 2 Ytororó
- Infantry Regiment no. 4 Curupayty
- Cavalry Regiment no. 2 Cnel. Toledo
- Divisional Sappers Battalion

=== 2nd Division ===
Commander – Lieutenant Colonel Arístides Ortellado

- Infantry Regiment no. 1 2 de Mayo
- Infantry Regiment no. 3 Corrales
- Infantry Regiment no. 10 Sauce

=== 8th Division ===
Commander – Lieutenant Colonel Eugenio Garay

- Infantry Regiment Batallón 40
- Infantry Regiment no. 16 Mariscal López
- Infantry Regiment no. 18 Pitiantuta

=== Independent units ===
- Artillery Group no. 1 General Bruguez
