= Arampampa =

- Town
- Location within Bolivia
- Coordinates: 17°57′S 66°05′W
- Country: Bolivia
- Department: Potosí Department
- Province: Bernardino Bilbao Province
- Municipality: Arampampa Municipality
- Canton: Arampampa Canton
- Time zone: UTC-4 (BOT)

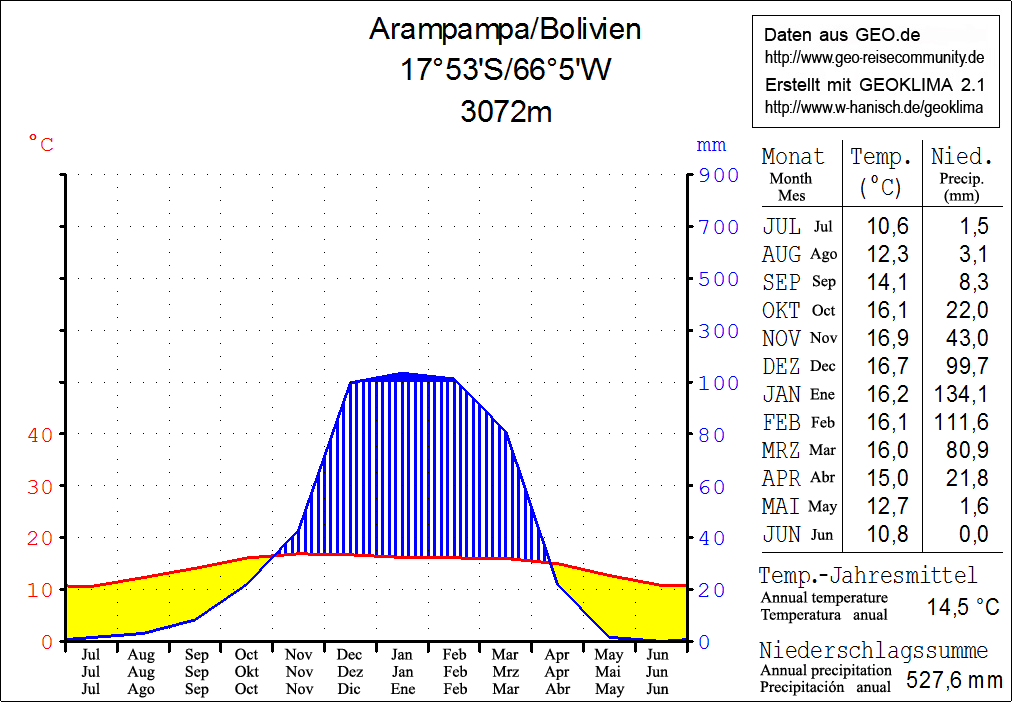
Climate chart for Arampampa

Arampampa is a small town in Bolivia, capital of the Bernandino Bilbao province to the north of the Department of Potosí. In 2010 it had an estimated population of 55.
