= Bernardino Bilbao Rioja =

Commander-in-Chief of the Bolivian Armed Forces (1939)

Marshal Bernardino Bilbao Rioja
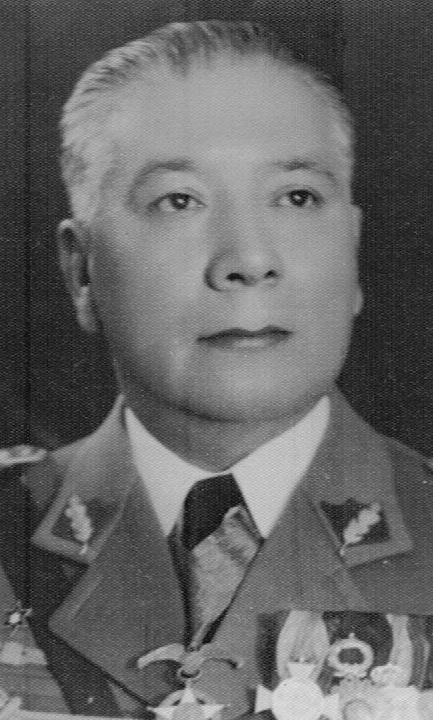
- Born: Bernardino Bilbao Rioja; 20 May 1895; Arampampa, Potosí, Bolivia
- Died: 13 May 1983 (aged 87); La Paz, Bolivia
- Education: Military College of the Army
- Spouse: Phyllis Grace Smith
- Relatives: José Bilbao Pastos (father); Andrea Rioja (mother)
- Military career
- Allegiance: Bolivia
- Branch: Bolivian Army; Bolivian Air Force
- Service years: 1918–1939
- Rank: General
- Conflicts: Chaco War; Battle of Cañada Strongest; Battle of Kilometer 7; First Battle of Alihuatá; Battle of Villamontes

Minister of War and Colonization
- In office 2 July 1930 – 5 March 1931
- President: Carlos Blanco Galindo
- Preceded by: Fidel Vega
- Succeeded by: José Leonardo Lanza

Minister of Development and Communications
- In office 2 July 1930 – 5 March 1931
- President: Carlos Blanco Galindo
- Preceded by: Carlos Banzer
- Succeeded by: Froilán Zambrana

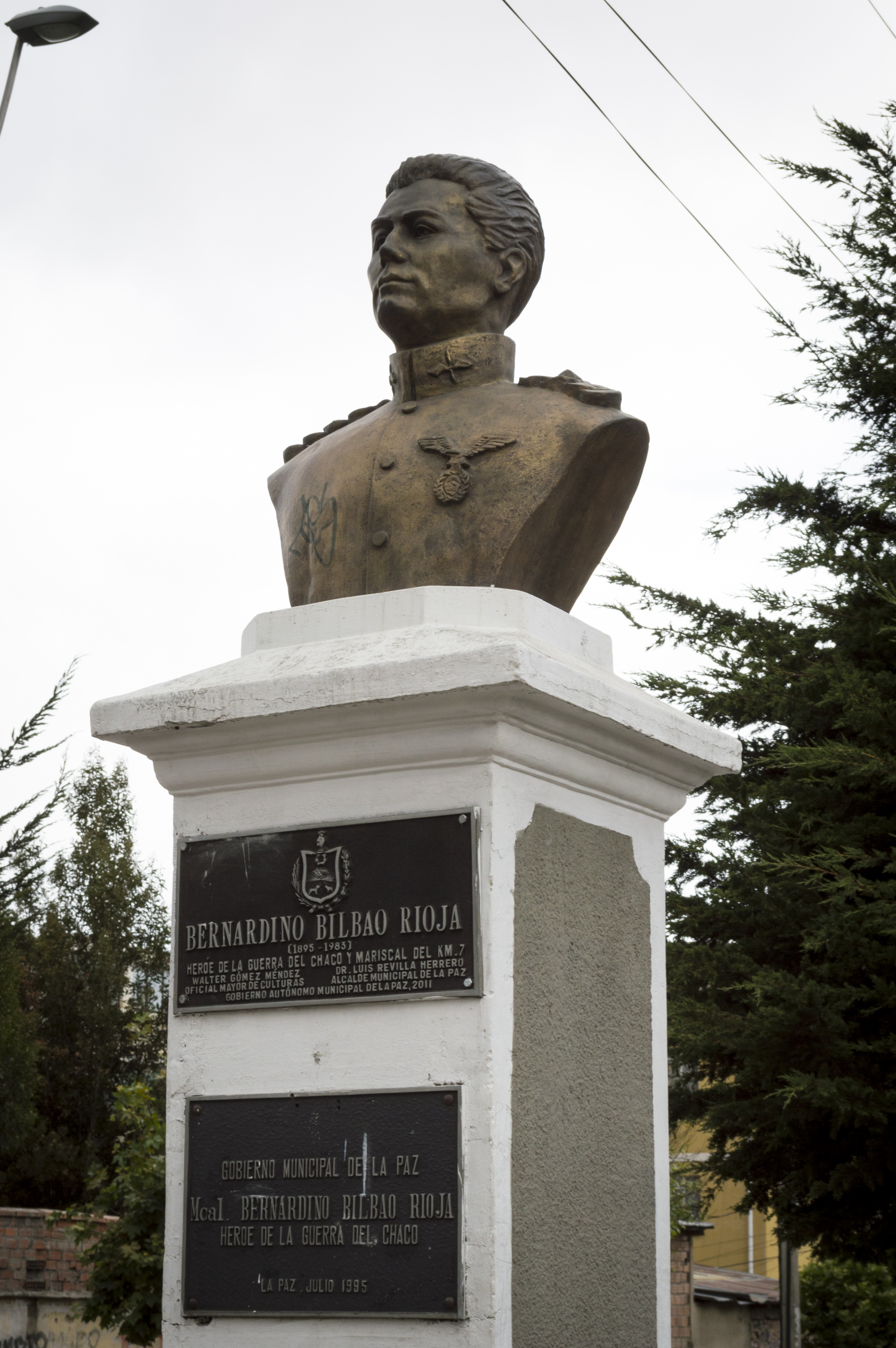
Bust of Bernardino Bilbao Rioja in La Paz, Bolivia

Bernardino Bilbao Rioja (20 May 1895 in Arampampa – 13 May 1983 in La Paz) was a Bolivian officer who served during the Chaco War (1932–35). He pioneered the use of air forces in combat (the first to be used in this capacity in South America).

Bilbao had already made enemies among his cohorts when he refused to participate in the 1930 coup against President of Bolivia Hernando Siles Reyes. This enmity led him to be vetoed for most major promotions within the military, both during the war and after. One of the reasons for the 1934 military uprising that toppled the Constitutional President Daniel Salamanca Urey was the latter's desire to replace the ineffective current commanders with Generals Lanza and Bilbao Rioja at the head of the army.

After the war, Bilbao's popularity converted him into a potential enemy to the aspirations of the likes of Col. David Toro Ruilova and Gen. Enrique Peñaranda. In particular, it was rumored that Bilbao would present himself in the 1940 elections against Peñaranda, a prospect that obviously troubled Peñaranda's supporters in the "Concordancia" (the agglomeration of most of the oligarchic, old-style parties united behind one candidate). Thus, Bilbao was promptly detained and then flown to exile in Chile. But he eventually returned, and indeed, ran for president in 1951 and 1966, both times representing the right-of-center Bolivian Socialist Falange. In the 1951 election, he placed third while Víctor Paz Estenssoro of the Revolutionary Nationalist Movement came first; the anti-system MNR and FSB won a combined majority of the vote, which was to be followed by the 1952 Revolution.

In 1966, he finished a distant second to René Barrientos. Despite losing both elections, he remained a popular and respected figure.

Bilbao Rioja died in La Paz on May 13, 1983, at age 87.

Party political offices
| Vacant Title last held by Germán Busch | Supreme Leader of the Legion of Veterans; 1939 | Succeeded by Office discontinued |
| Preceded by New political party | Bolivian Socialist Falange nominee for President of Bolivia; 1951 | Succeeded by Óscar Únzaga |
| Preceded by New political alliance | Christian Democratic Community nominee for President of Bolivia; 1966 | Succeeded by Alliance dissolved |
