= Enrique Peñaranda =

President of Bolivia from 1940 to 1943

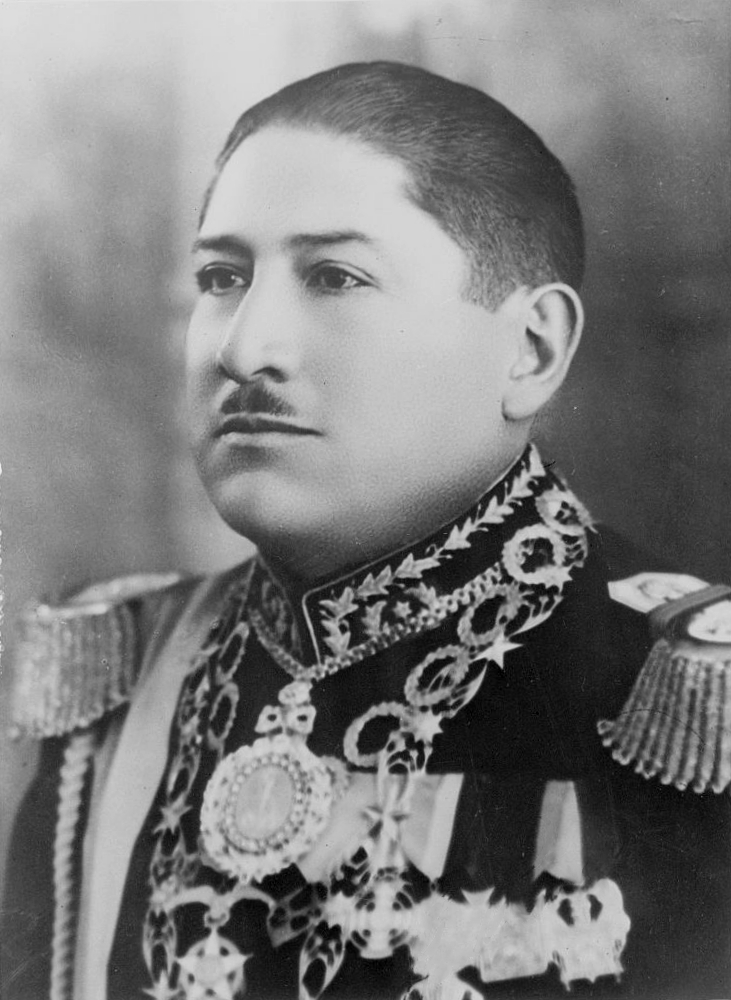

38th President of Bolivia
- In office 15 April 1940 – 20 December 1943
- Preceded by: Carlos Quintanilla (interim)
- Succeeded by: Gualberto Villarroel

Personal details
- Born: Enrique Peñaranda del Castillo; 15 November 1892 Sorata, La Paz, Bolivia
- Died: 22 December 1969 (aged 77) Madrid, Spain
- Party: Concordance (Note: Coalition consisting of PL, PRG and PRS.)
- Spouse: Graciela Serrano
- Children: 1
- Parent(s): Teodosio Peñaranda; María del Castillo
- Education: Military College of the Army

Military service
- Allegiance: Bolivia
- Branch/service: Bolivian Army
- Years of service: 1910–1935
- Rank: General
- Battles/wars: Chaco War
- Awards: Order of the Condor of the Andes

Enrique Peñaranda del Castillo (15 November 1892 – 22 December 1969) was a Bolivian general who served as the 38th president of Bolivia from 1940 until his overthrow in 1943. He previously served as commander-in-chief of the country's armed forces during the second half of the Chaco War (1932–1935).

Once elected in 1940, Peñarada oversaw the return of the traditional conservative policies Bolivia had seen prior to the Chaco War which had previously been almost completely marginalized by the military socialist administrations of David Toro and Germán Busch. Under his administration, Bolivia entered World War II on the Allied side, pledging its tin resources for the war effort. While popular abroad, discontent continued amongst the Bolivian populace and in late 1943 he was overthrown in coup d'état which briefly attempted to reassert Toro and Busch-era leftist policies.

== Early life and education ==
Enrique Peñarada was born on 15 November 1892 in Hacienda Porobaya in the Chuchulaya canton (present municipality of Sorata), Larecaja province, La Paz. The plaque beneath his statue in the Sorata plaza presents his date of birth as being 17 October 1892. He was the son of a mestizo mother, María del Castillo, and an indigenous father, Teodosio Peñaranda, a member of a politically influential family of Aymara heritage. His cousin was Nestor Peñaranda, a well-known Methodist Evangelical missionary who worked among the indigenous peoples of La Paz.

In 1907, he entered the Military College of the Army in the capital of La Paz where he graduated with the rank of Second Lieutenant 1910. Peñaranda rose quickly through the ranks becoming a lieutenant in 1915 and captain in 1920 serving in 1921 as commander of the 3rd Infantry Regiment "Perez". In 1924, he was promoted the rank of major then lieutenant colonel in 1928 and finally colonel in 1932.

== Chaco War ==
=== Pitiantutá Lake incident ===
In 1932 Peñarada contributed to the outbreak of the Chaco War between Bolivia and Paraguay over the disputed Gran Chaco. By this point, President Daniel Salamanca had made it his ambition to resolve the territorial dispute which had been present for almost a century. The Bolivian army implemented a triple penetration plan in the Chaco through land surveying expeditions. On 6 May 1932, during negotiations between the two states in Washington D.C., Francis White, president of the Commission on Neutrals, suggested that a non-aggression pact would, as a starting point, define the boundary as being the territories occupied by the parties at the moment of its signature. the Bolivian army accelerated its plan to locate and occupy the lagoon. This encouraged Major Óscar Moscoso, against Salamanca's direct orders not to engage the Paraguayans, to accelerate his plans to occupy the recently discovered Pitiantutá Lake.

On 15 July 1932, Colonel Peñarada, as temporary leader of the 4th Division located in Fort Muñoz, participated in the attack on the Paraguayan Fort Carlos Antonio López at Pitiantutá Lake. Upon learning of these developments, president Salamanca ordered General Filiberto Osorio to immediately vacate the fort. On 19 June, Peñarada agreed to sign a "representation" written by General Osorio stating that they were located on the west bank of the lake. However, Peñaranda knew from a sketch he had received from Moscoso that this information was false and the fort was in fact on the east bank.

Even so, Peñaranda signed the "representation" and justified himself years after the war stating that he had suffered "suffocating moral pressure" from his superiors. President Salamanca, after a heated meeting with Osorio, ended up accepting the false representation. Without knowing where the new fort was, he thought that the Bolivian occupation of the west side of the lagoon could be transformed into a natural boundary between Bolivia and Paraguay.

=== Battle of Boquerón ===
On 5 July, negotiations in Washington collapsed when the Paraguayans withdrew due to the "unspeakable" Bolivian attack on the Carlos Antonio López fort. After the initial incident, Salamanca changed his status quo policy over the disputed area. Colonel Peñarada was ordered to occupy forts Corrales and Toledo which he did on July 27 and 28. On 31 July, Bolivian forces occupied the Paraguayan fort Boquerón with the Paraguayans beginning a battle to retake it in September.

Peñarada was ordered to move his detachment to bring aid to the encircled forces at Boquerón but was held up from September 11 to 28 in numerous failed attempts to break the Paraguayan resistance in the areas bordering the Yujra and Ramírez fort. On 29 September, Paraguayan forces retook fort Boquerón. After the fall of Boquerón, he replaced Colonel Francisco Peña as commander of the 4th Division and led the withdrawal of the Bolivian army towards Saavedra, abandoning various forts including the important and strategic fort Arce.

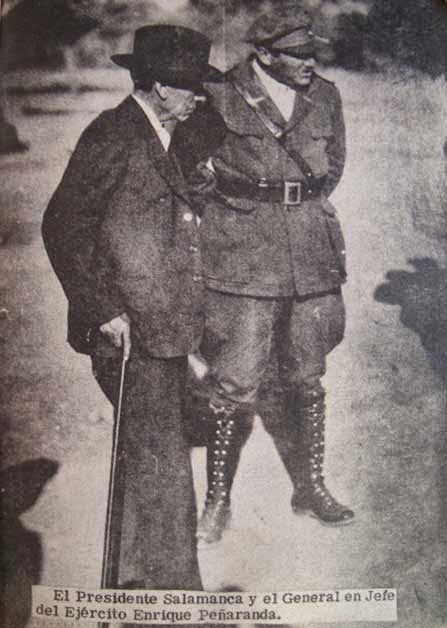
General Peñaranda with President Salamanca in the Chaco.

=== Promotion and conflict with Salamanca ===
Following the disastrous defeat of Bolivia at the battle of the Campo Vía pocket in which up to 9,000 Bolivian soldiers were encircled and killed or captured, president Salamanca forced the resignation of Hans Kundt, the German head of the army. Salamanca replaced Kundt with Peñarada whom he falsely believed had managed to break out and escape the Paraguayan encirclement, a fact Peñaranda never attempted clarify. In this way, Peñarada went from a regimental commander to being promoted to brigadier general and appointed Commander-in-Chief of the Armed Forces.

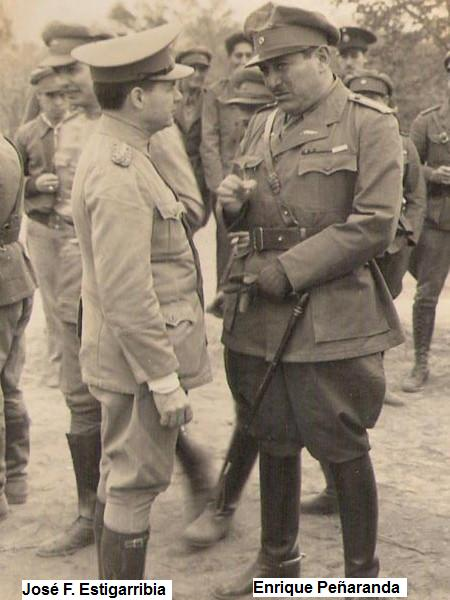
Commanders-in-chief of both armies meet at Merino Post, 18 July 1935

The relationship between Peñaranda and Salamanca, who distrusted the military's ability to conduct the war, quickly degraded. One major point of contention between the two was the question of appointments and promotions of military officers. Peñaranda believed that it was an internal, purely military question, while the president insisted that it was his constitutional prerogative to appoint and dismiss officers as he saw fit. Salamanca also feared that opposition among military leaders to Peñaranda's attempts to promote officers such as Colonel David Toro would lead to rebellion amongst army leadership. Despite this tense relationship, and although Peñarada presented his resignation twice, President Salamanca ignored them because he considered that the different factions of the army respected him because he did not overshadow anyone.

Salamanca's choice to keep Peñarada in charge would soon change after the Battle of El Carmen on 16 November 1934, in which two Bolivian divisions were annihilated and the army retreated from the powerful fort Ballivian, a symbol of the Bolivian presence in the Chaco, to Villamontes. Salamanca held General Peñaranda responsible for the disaster and decided then to replace him as head of the army with General José Leonardo Lanza. On 27 November 1934, Salamanca personally arrived at military headquarters in Villamontes just twelve kilometers from the frontline of the war. This decision by Salamanca to personally go to the military headquarters with minimal guard proved to be a mistake. On the orders of General Peñarada and Colonel Toro, Major Germán Busch led troops extracted from the frontline to the staudt house where Salamanca was staying and forced his resignation.

Villamontes itself would fall in a battle that lasted between January and 12 June 1935 when the war finally came to an end with an armistice signed in Buenos Aires. On 18 July 1935, in Merino Post, located near Villamontes, the two commanders-in-chief of the opposing armies, General Enrique Peñarada and General José Félix Estigarribia met for the first time following the armistice. The simplicity of Estigarribia's uniform and his calm demeanor contrasted sharply with the decorations, belt and whip carried by Peñaranda who was reportedly "trembling" with emotion.

== President (1940–1943) ==
=== 1940 general election ===
The period following the end of the Chaco War saw a recognizable leftward shift for the country. The government of José Luis Tejada Sorzano, Salamanca's vice president who had been installed following the 27 November coup, was quickly deposed himself by Germán Busch and David Toro. Between 1936 and 1939, the Toro and later Busch administrations began a trend of "Military Socialism" which mixed military dictatorship in an alliance with labor unions and leftists. This came to an end when President Germán Busch suddenly committed suicide on 23 August 1939. The more conservative elements of the military seized the opportunity and installed General Carlos Quintanilla as interim president until new elections could be called.

Faced with the leftist movements of the so-called "Generacion del Chaco", the traditional Liberal (PL), Genuine Republican (PRG), and Republican Socialist (PRS) parties banded together into an electoral political alliance known as Concordance. They presented General Enrique Peñaranda, one of the nearest approximations of a war hero produced by the Chaco War, as their singular candidate. His run for office was aided by the interim government of Quintanilla which on 29 October 1939, arrested, beat, and deported Bernardino Bilbao Rioja, the primary leftist contender, to Chile.

The 1940 Bolivian general election was held on 10 March 1940. With most opposition suppressed, Peñaranda won with 85.99% of the vote with the Marxist José Antonio Arze of the Revolutionary Left Party (PIR) coming in second with just 11.32% of the vote. Inaugurated on 15 April of that year, the new president did not enjoy the benefit of a congressional majority, and was mistrusted by many in his own coalition, not to mention the gathering forces of the reformist left.

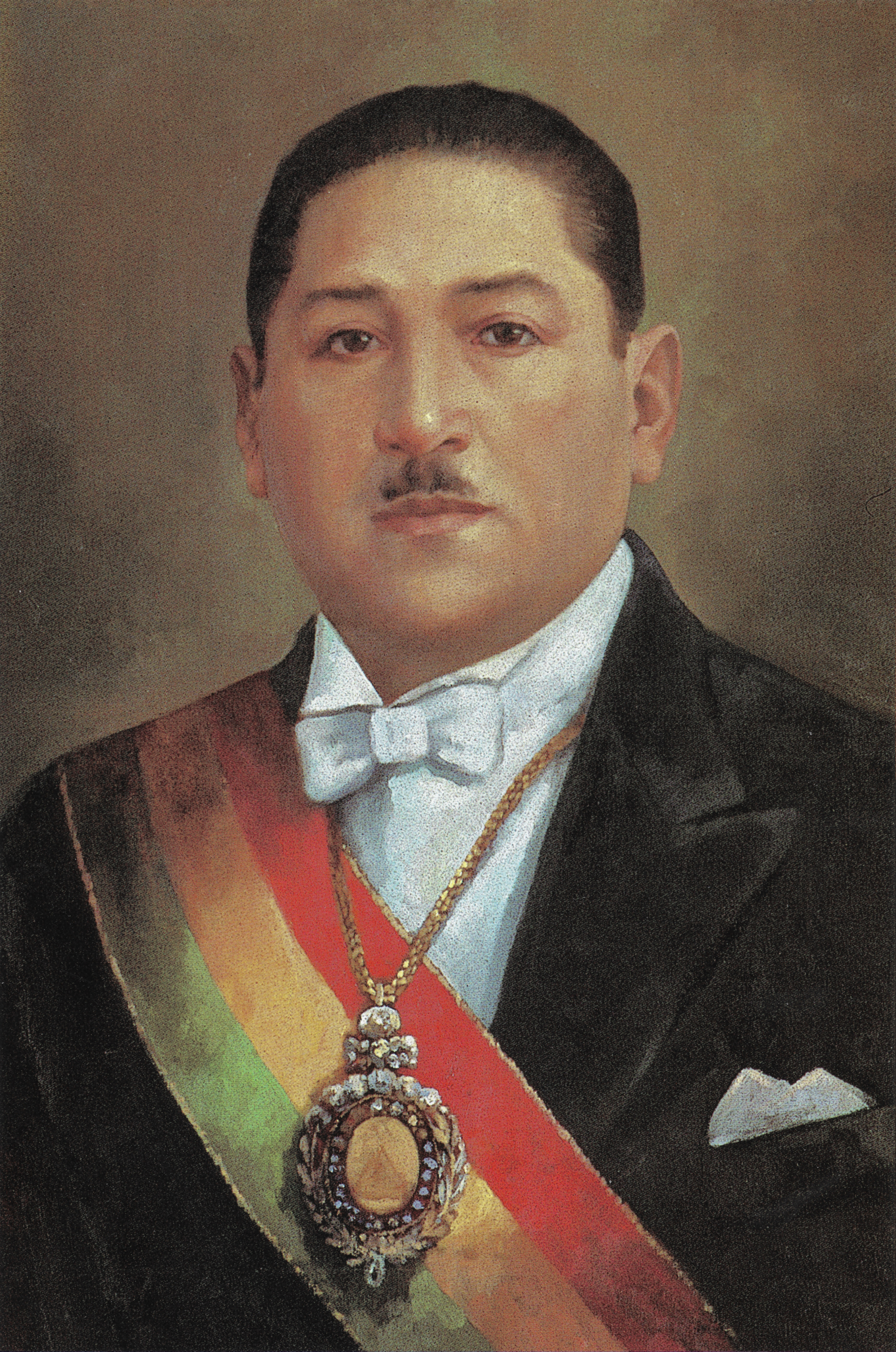
Portrait of Peñaranda as President by Zenón Sansuste, Palacio Quemado

=== The "Nazi Putsch" ===
While Peñaranda had successfully managed to wrestle control over the executive from the previous progressive movements, his new administration found itself hampered by its inability to command a majority in Congress. A subject of particular dispute was the controversy over oil in Bolivia. Under the administration of David Toro, the properties of Standard Oil in Bolivia had been seized. With the outbreak of World War II in Europe, the United States became increasingly concerned over access to oil in the Western Hemisphere. The U.S. was willing to provide extensive economic assistance to Bolivia but was hesitant to reward a country which had refused to cooperate in arranging compensation for the confiscated Standard Oil property.

Though Peñaranda was far more willing to negotiate than previous governments, he faced opposition from the newly established Revolutionary Nationalist Movement (MNR) whose founding members had been strong supporters of the efforts of Toro in defense of the nation's resources. Fearing angering the opposition as well as the popular sentiments of the citizenry against Standard Oil, Peñaranda sought a method of acquiring U.S. aid while circumnavigating the issue. This opportunity came with the so-called "Nazi Putsch" of July 1941.

On 24 July 1941, Peñaranda declared a state of siege in the country. The announcement came after the alleged uncovering of a letter sent by the Bolivian military attaché in Berlin, Major Elias Belmonte, addressed to the German minister in La Paz, Ernst Wendler. The letter, photocopied by Douglas Jenkins, U.S. minister in La Paz, and delivered on 18 July to Foreign Minister Ostria Gutiérrez, declared that "the time is approaching to carry out our coup to liberate my (Belmonte's) poor country from a weak government of completely capitalist inclinations." While Jenkins claimed the source of the letter merited full confidence, the Department of State was unable to guarantee the authenticity of the signature.

Authentic or not, Wendler was declared persona non grata and expelled from the country on 19 July while Belmonte was dismissed from the army for "treason" on 24 July. Wendler asserted that "the charges against the legation are pure fabrications," while Belmonte, who only learned of the affair on 26 July after returning from vacation in southern Germany, claimed that the letter was an "obvious falsification."

While the Belmonte-Wendler letter made no reference to the MNR, the result of the "Putsch" was nevertheless used by Peñaranda as an opportunity to silence the opposition. Using the powers allotted to him by the state of siege, Peñaranda closed three periodicals published by the MNR and arrested various MNR military officers and civilian leaders including Armando Arce, Wálter Guevara, Carlos Montenegro, and Augusto Céspedes. MNR legislators such as Víctor Paz Estenssoro were only spared arrest due to parliamentary immunity. As a result of the arrests, the MNR was made to be associated with Nazi Fascism in the minds of the Bolivian public.

It would eventually be revealed on 18 March 1971 that the letter had been fabricated by British Intelligence at Station M as a maneuver to combat German influence in Bolivia.

The event also succeeded in giving confidence to the U.S. government that Bolivia would work as an anti-Nazi partner in Latin America. Just 10 days later on 1 August, the Department of State proposed a long-term collaboration including a loan. On 27 January 1942, Bolivia and Standard Oil reached a settlement for $1.7 million. The next day in Rio de Janeiro, the U.S. signed a $25 million economic program with Bolivia while La Paz severed diplomatic relations with the Axis Powers. The settlement with Standard Oil was criticized widely in Bolivia. Paz Estenssoro charged that Peñaranda cared more for the interests of the company than the interests of his own country. Céspedes called the action a "vulgar deal" which infringed Bolivian sovereignty and hurt national pride.

=== World War II ===
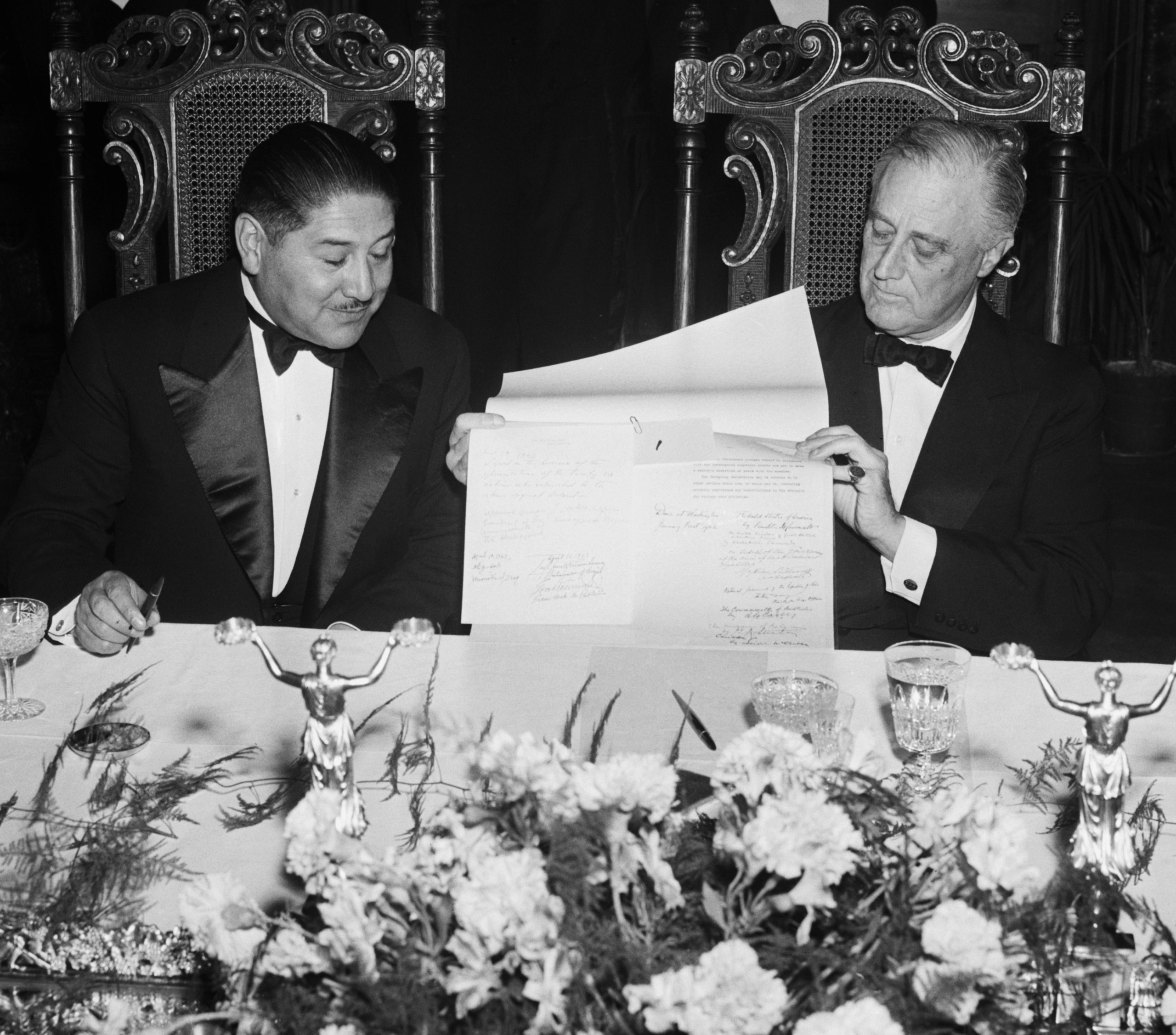
Presidents Enrique Peñaranda and Franklin D. Roosevelt at a White House state dinner, 5 May 1943

Following the Japanese attack on Pearl Harbor, Bolivia became one of the later countries to join the United States in World War II. Immediately after the events of 7 December 1941, Bolivia declared its solidarity with the U.S. Despite this, the Peñaranda administration was late to declare war and join the Allies, doing so with Chile and Colombia on 7 April 1943.

Starting in May 1943, Peñaranda began a diplomatic tour of various American countries visiting Peru, Ecuador, Colombia, Venezuela, Brazil, Panama, Haiti, Mexico, Cuba, Canada and the United States where he toured the country and was received by President Franklin Delano Roosevelt on 5 May. It was during this visit that Peñaranda pledged the country's tin resources to the allied war effort. Bolivia at the time was the only producer and supplier of the ore in the Western Hemisphere since the Southeast Asian producing regions were under Japanese occupation. However, Peñaranda's decision to sell the country's tin at exorbitantly low rates of as low as 40.5 cents per pound resulted in further discontent amongst the Bolivian populace.

=== Coup d'état and exile ===
Despite the popularity of his government in Washington, at home the Peñaranda administration was difficult and marred by repression. Peñaranda continued to suffer from popular dissatisfaction from the citizenry especially miners as economic conditions continued to deteriorate, prompting a number of crippling strikes that, in turn, led to the proclamation of extra-constitutional means to restore order. Worker's movements had managed to make gains under the Toro and Busch administrations and feared the loss of these now that the traditionalist parties had returned to power. The culmination of this discontent came with the Catavi Massacre of miners on 21 December 1942. The death of 19 miners demanding increased wages further tarnished the Peñaranda administration.

Just under a year later on 20 December 1943, President Enrique Peñaranda was deposed in a coup d'état led by the young military officer Gualberto Villaroel and supported by the MNR. After briefly being held under house arrest, Peñarandad began a long life in exile and never participated in Bolivian politics again.

He died in Madrid, Spain, on 22 December 1969.

== See also ==
- Cabinet of Enrique Peñaranda
- List of presidents of Bolivia

== Bibliography ==
- Querejazu Calvo, Roberto. "Masamaclay."
- Farcau, Bruce W. "The Chaco War: Bolivia and Paraguay, 1932–1935."
- Mesa José de; Gisbert, Teresa; and Carlos D. Mesa, "Historia De Bolivia," 5th edition., pp. 551–573.
- Arze Quiroga, Eduardo (1951). Documents for a history of the Chaco war: selected from the archive of Daniel Salamanca Vol. 4.
- Osorio, Juan Antonio (1973). Entretelones de la Guerra del Chaco. (in Spanish)
- Calvo, Roberto Querejazu (1981). Political, diplomatic and military history of the Chaco war. (in Spanish)
- Dunkerley, James (1987). Orígenes del poder militar: Bolivia 1879-1935. Plural editores. ISBN 99905-75-18-5. (in Spanish)
- Guachalla, Luis Fernando (1978). Jayucubás. (in Spanish)
- Blasier, Cole. The United States, Germany, and the Bolivian Revolutionaries (1941-1946).
- Gutiérrez, Alberto Ostria (1944). Una revolución tras los Andes (in Spanish). Editorial Nascimento.
- Céspedes, Augusto (1975). El presidente colgado (in Spanish). Editorial Universitaria de Buenos Aires.

Military offices
Preceded by Hans Kundt	Commander-in-Chief of the Armed Forces; 1933–1938	Succeeded by Carlos Quintanilla
Party political offices
Preceded by New political alliance	Concordance nominee for President of Bolivia; 1940	Succeeded by Alliance dissolved
Political offices
Preceded by Carlos Quintanilla; Interim	President of Bolivia; 1940–1943	Succeeded by Gualberto Villarroel
