= José Félix Estigarribia =

Paraguayan military officer and politician (1888–1940)

Field Marshal José Félix Estigarribia
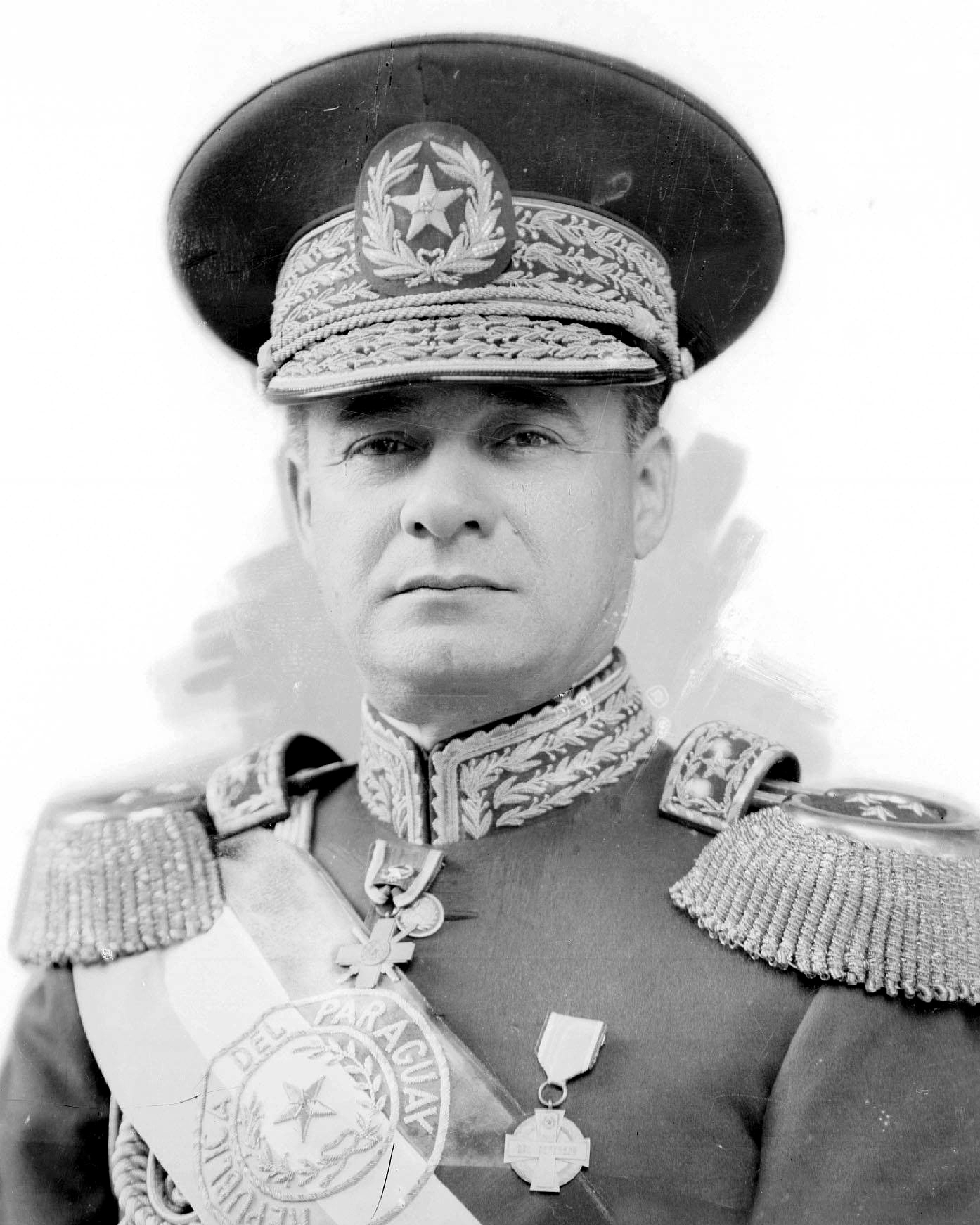
- Estigarribia c. 1939

34th President of Paraguay
- In office 15 August 1939 – 7 September 1940
- Vice President: Luis Alberto Riart
- Preceded by: Félix Paiva
- Succeeded by: Higinio Morínigo

Personal details
- Born: José Félix Estigarribia Insaurralde; February 21, 1888 Caraguatay, Paraguay
- Died: September 7, 1940 (aged 52) Altos, Paraguay
- Resting place: National Pantheon of the Heroes
- Party: Liberal Party
- Spouse: Julia Miranda Cueto (m. 1917)
- Children: 1
- Education: Trinity College of Agriculture
- Occupation: Military officer; politician

Military service
- Allegiance: Paraguay
- Branch/service: Paraguayan Army
- Years of service: 1911–1940
- Rank: Field marshal (posthumously)
- Battles/wars: Chaco War

José Félix Estigarribia Insaurralde (21 February 1888 – 7 September 1940) was a Paraguayan military officer and politician who served as the 34th President of Paraguay from 1939 until his death in a plane crash on 7 September 1940. He is remembered for his role as commander in chief of the Paraguayan Army during the Chaco War, which resulted in an upset victory for Paraguay.

He is recognized for being one of the military officers of the Paraguayan Army who led Paraguay to victory in the Chaco War against Bolivia, having been a prominent military strategist during the armed conflict and considered a war hero. During his life he reached the rank of lieutenant general, being posthumously promoted to field marshal shortly after his death.

In the late 1930s, Estigarribia was courted by both the Colorado Party and Liberal Party to run for president. He decided to join the Liberals, who were more dominant at the time. As president, he suspended the constitution and replaced it with a new one which gave him dictatorial powers. His authoritarian rule ended after only a year, when he and his wife were killed in a plane crash. He was succeeded by his Minister of War, Higinio Morínigo, who used Estigarribia's constitution to establish his own dictatorship.

== Early life ==
José Félix Estigarribia Insaurralde was born on 21 February 1888 in Caraguatay, Cordillera, to Mateo Estigarribia and Casilda Insaurralde, who were both peasants of Basque ancestry.

He went to the elementary school of his hometown. and in 1908, he studied at Trinity College of Agriculture. However, after he had obtained his diploma, Estigarribia switched careers and in 1910 joined the army with the rank of lieutenant of infantry.

== Early career ==
Educated as an agronomist, Estigarribia joined the National Army in 1910; he took additional training in Chile and in Saint Cyr's military academy in France. He commanded the First Infantry Division during the Chaco War with Bolivia, and was promoted successively to brigadier, division general, and commander-in-chief of the armed forces. In 1935, he made a victorious return to Asunción as "Hero of the Chaco War" and was awarded a lifetime pension of 1,000 gold pesos a month. After President Eusebio Ayala was overthrown in the Febrerista Revolution by Rafael Franco, Estigarribia was dismissed from the position of armed forces chief but served as Paraguay's ambassador to the United States.

He completed courses in Chile, from 1911 to 1913, the Military School of Bernardo O'Higgins. In 1917 he was promoted to captain. He played an important role in the Paraguayan Civil War and was later promoted to Major. For their skills, he was selected to attend the course staff, three years at the École Supérieure de Guerre at Paris, where he was a disciple of General Maurice Gamelin and Marshal Foch; Estigarribia graduated there with top notes. On his return in 1928, he was appointed Chief of Staff of the Army. Less than a year later he was removed from office because of disagreements with the government regarding the strategy for defending the Chaco: "The Chaco should be abandoning it," he argued, the point being not to occupy the land but to destroy the enemy. However, as the war against Bolivia seemed inevitable, the government decided that Lieutenant Colonel Estigarribia was the man who was needed in the Chaco. He was then 44 years old.

== Chaco War ==
Estigarribia was the commander-in-chief of the army and the conductor of operations during the Chaco War (1932–1935). He managed to stop the Bolivian advance towards the Paraguay River by using a fast counter-attack and forced them back to the Rio Parapiti.

He directed the Paraguayan Army during the first year of war with the rank of colonel. He was promoted to general after the victory of Campo Grande and Pozo Favorite. In recognition of services rendered to the defending the Chaco, he was promoted to the rank of marshal after his death in 1940.

== Postwar ==
In 1938, Estigarribia was Minister to the United States. He successfully negotiated a U.S. economic aid package to Paraguay.

Estigarribia was elected president for a four-year term in 1939 and assumed office on 15 August. On 14 February 1940, there was a military coup attempt against Estigarribia. In response to the coup attempt, on 18 February 1940, Estigarribia dissolved the legislature, seized emergency powers, and suspended the Constitution. Declaring that "our nation is on the edge of horrible anarchy", he announced that democracy would be restored as soon as a workable constitutional framework could be designed. Estigarribia argued only a temporary dictatorship could save the nation.

It turned out to be an empty promise; within five months, he recast the constitution into a severely authoritarian document. The president was vested with sweeping powers to act for what he deemed to be the good of the state, codifying Estigarribia's emergency powers. At the same time, the legislature's powers were significantly curtailed. The constitution was approved in an August referendum; official figures showed an implausible 92 percent voting in favor of the new document. It transformed Estigarribia's presidency into a legal dictatorship.

Estigarribia was friendly towards the United States during this period; some nationalists in the Paraguay military favored Germany, which was at war in Europe.

Estigarribia's domestic adversaries were funded by Argentina.

On September 7, 1940, Estigarribia and his wife, First Lady Julia Miranda Cueto, were on a tour of the Paraguayan interior. A Breda Ba.44 transport plane was to have been used for his customary 15-minute plane ride to San Bernardino, but Estigarribia diverted it to the Chaco region to ferry an ailing veteran. Major Carmelo Peralta was ordered to prepare a Potez 25 in order to transport the President and the first lady. A few minutes after taking off, the plane crashed near the city of Altos, killing its occupants. Examinations of the wreckage revealed that the propeller shaft had snapped.

Estigarribia was succeeded by Higinio Morínigo and was posthumously promoted to the rank of marshal. His authoritarian constitution would remain in effect until 1967, when it was replaced with an equally repressive document that remained in effect until 1992.

== Bibliography ==
- Soto Vera, Anahí (2021). José Félix Estigarribia: En Invicto. Protagonistas de la Guerra Del Chaco Series. Asunción: Editorial Atlas S.A. ISBN 978-99925-227-5-2.

Political offices
Preceded by Félix Paiva	President of Paraguay; 1939–1940	Succeeded by Higinio Morínigo
