= Pablo Busch =

German-born explorer, physician, and politician (1867–1950)

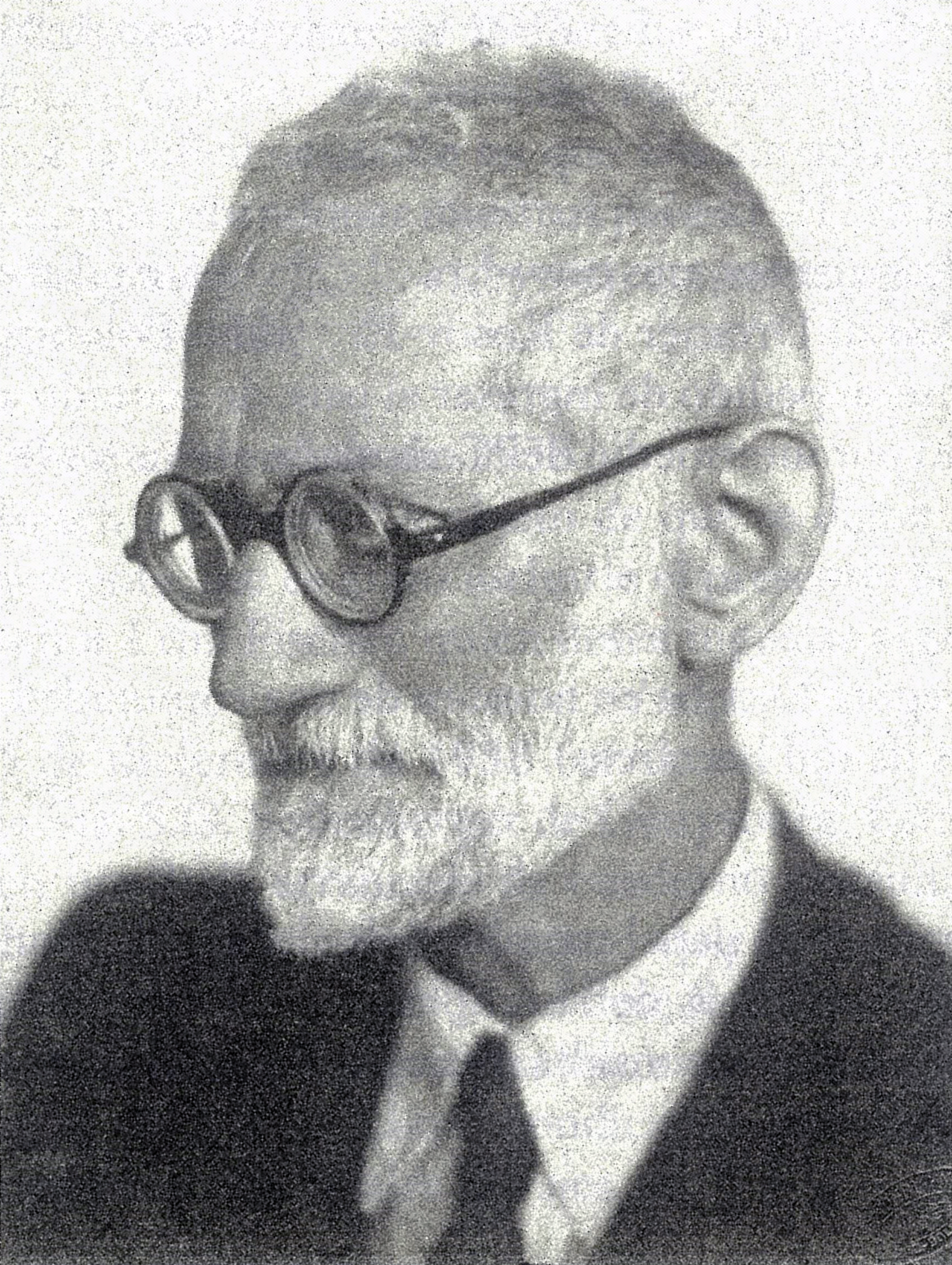
- Portrait of Busch, c. 1930
- Born: Paul Erich Busch; 4 November 1867; Königsaue, Prussia, North German Confederation
- Died: 3 May 1950 (aged 82); Portachuelo, Santa Cruz, Bolivia
- Occupations: Explorer; physician; politician
- Spouses: Raquel Becerra Villavicencio (m. 1893; sep. 1903) Enriqueta Antelo Hurtado (m. 1912, separated)
- Partner: Petrona Baldivieso (c. 1908–1910)
- Children: 9, including Germán
- Relatives: Alberto Natusch (grandson)

Paul Erich "Pablo" Busch Wiesener (Note: In this Spanish name, the first or paternal surname is Busch and the second or maternal family name is Wiesener. Busch emigrated to Bolivia when it was common practice for foreign nationals to Hispanicize their names. During return trips to Europe, Busch would revert to his given name.) (4 November 1867 – 3 May 1950) was a German-born Bolivian explorer, physician, and politician. He served as subprefect of Ñuflo de Chávez Province from 1924 to 1925 and was the father of Germán Busch, the president of Bolivia from 1937 to 1939.

Born in Königsaue and educated as a surgeon, Busch emigrated from Imperial Germany to eastern Bolivia during the Amazon rubber boom. He was a shareholder and branch manager of the German-run trading company Zeller & Co., and made several medical expeditions along the Amazon and its tributaries. Busch led a nomadic lifestyle, with a presence in various communities in Beni and Santa Cruz. He started and abandoned multiple families and left many descendants throughout his lifetime.

During the Acre War, Busch lent logistical support to the Bolivian expeditionary force commanded by President José Manuel Pando. He gained recognition for his anti-blockade actions against Brazilian separatists. A member of the Republican Party, he was subprefect of the Ñuflo de Chávez Province. His imposition of order amid rampant banditry gave him a reputation for ruthlessness across the department.

Busch reconnected with his son Germán in 1937 and was a trusted member of the president's administration. Historians partially attribute his influence to improved Bolivian–German relations during this time. Busch was caught in Germany during the outbreak of World War II and was interned by the United Kingdom after the conflict's conclusion. Bolivian diplomatic efforts secured his repatriation, and he died in Portachuelo in 1950.

== Background and early life ==
=== Origins and family background ===
Paul Busch was born on 4 November 1867 in Königsaue, an agrarian settlement in the fertile Magdeburg Börde, in what is now the Bördeland Municipality of Saxony-Anhalt. His father, Ferdinand Busch, was Kapellmeister of St. John's, the Lutheran church in neighboring Eickendorf, and taught music and mathematics there and in the adjacent villages. His mother was Bertha Wiesener, and he was one of between four and seven siblings. (Note: Descendants of the Busch–Becerra line assert that Busch was one of seven siblings; those in the Busch–Antelo line claim only four. "Only the [latter version] has concrete data", says Brockmann.)

Of his three known brothers, only one, Georg, accompanied Busch abroad. He moved to Bolivia in 1906, where he captained a steamboat that traversed the Mamoré River in the employ of his brother's company. After four years, he returned to Germany to work in Neumünster. Another brother, Wilhelm, studied philology in Berlin and spent his life as a school professor. Little is known of "Juan" – a translation of either Johann, Johannes, or Hans – the presumed eldest brother. An accountant and merchant, oral history states that he founded a brewery.

=== Education and emigration ===
Busch completed his primary education in Eickendorf and attended secondary in neighboring Magdeburg. He graduated as a physician in Halle an der Saale and completed specialist medical training at several German institutes. (Note: Heinrich lists Busch attending universities in Magdeburg, Halle, and Leipzig. Brockmann states that he studied in Hamburg and Berlin. Hollweg claims he attended the "University of Berlin", without specifying which institution. All three authors agree that he concluded his studies in Berlin.) He received a doctorate in surgery with a specialization in tropical diseases from a university in Berlin. Writer Carlos Montenegro states that Busch was "little more than in his mid-adolescence" by the time he completed his university studies.

In 1890, at age 23, Busch immigrated to Bolivia to seek a career in education. The exact motives for his departure are unclear. Historian Delia Heinrich states that he was forced into exile due to his anti-monarchist views. Busch booked passage on the Hamburg America Line and made port in Buenos Aires. From there, he traveled by land through the northern Argentine trail, passing the cities of Rosario, Santa Fe, and Santiago del Estero toward the Bolivian frontier. En route, he was attacked by bandits but fought off his attackers. In a tale recounted by historian Mario Gabriel Hollweg, Busch fractured one bandit's skull with his cane and delivered the other to the police himself.

== Presence in Bolivia ==
=== Business ventures and medical practice ===
Upon his arrival in Bolivia, Busch settled in Santa Cruz de la Sierra, a city isolated from the Andean west but which benefited from the flourishing rubber boom. There, Busch developed a close friendship with Wálter Villinger, a compatriot from Biberach an der Riß in Baden, who invited him to enter business with one Emilio Zeller. A wholesaler who emigrated from Baden around the 1880s, Zeller had established himself as the largest industrialist in the Bolivian orient. His joint trading company primarily dealt in the import-export trade but had a hand in several industries and operated a sizeable fleet of steamboats. Villinger and Busch's involvement with Zeller gave rise to Zeller, Villinger & Co., with Busch as one of the firm's main shareholders.

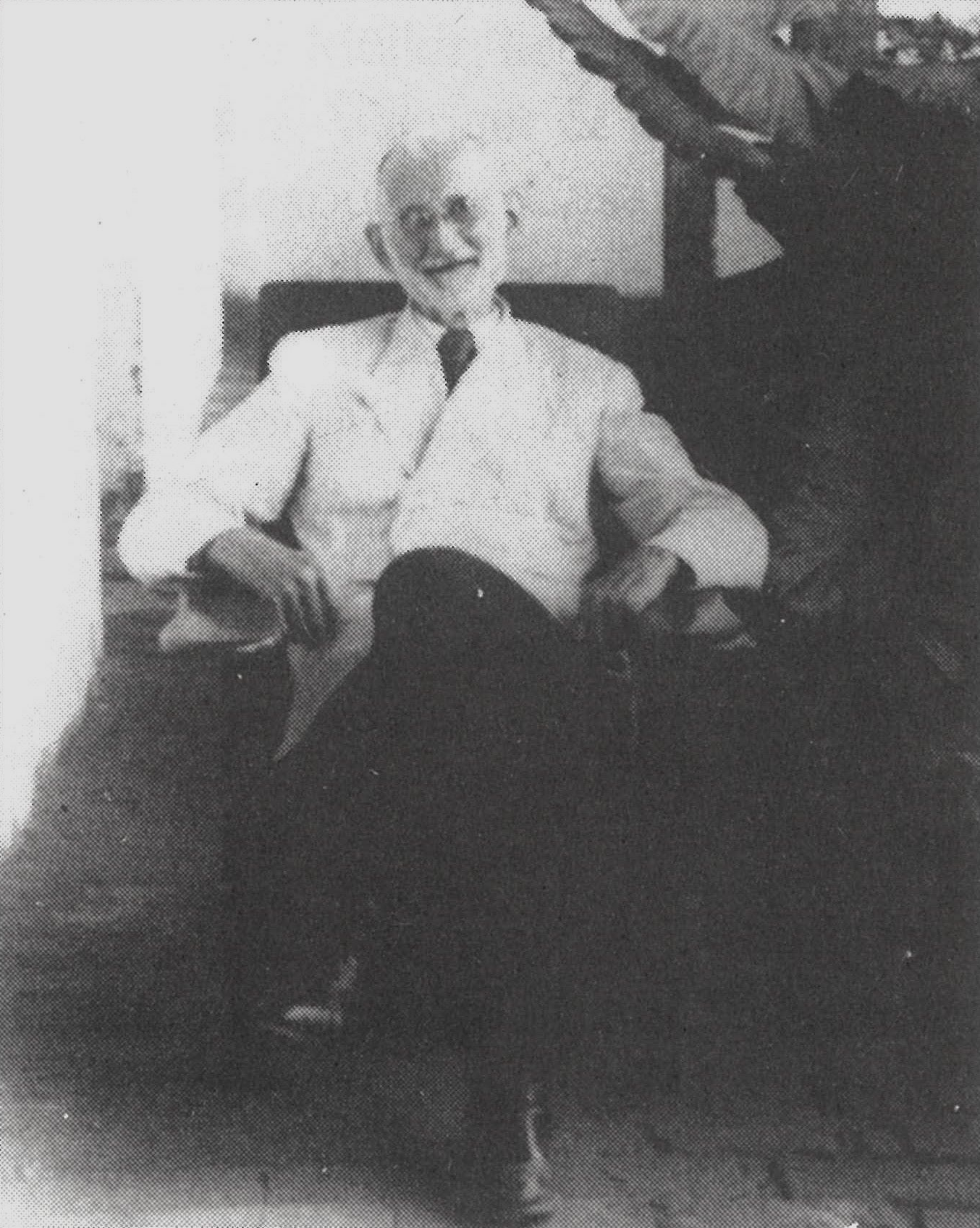
Photo of Busch taken in La Paz or Cochabamba, c. 1937–1939

Over the following years, Busch navigated the many tributaries of the Amazon basin, which connected isolated communities to the major eastern population centers. He attended – often pro bono – to the medical needs of local indigenous tribes. According to Hollweg, his penchant for accurate diagnoses, efficient treatments, and therapeutic accomplishments led some to label him a "witch or curandero". Between 1893 and 1895, Busch settled in Trinidad, Beni, where he practiced medicine and managed the branch office of his partners' firm. However, dissatisfaction with sedentary life spurred him to move on. For the next eight years, Busch lived as a semi-nomad. His recurrent medical expeditions and business ventures on behalf of Zeller led him to frequent several riverside communities in the departments of Beni and Santa Cruz, especially Baures, the site of his trade office, and San Javier, where he owned a residence.

Busch supported the Bolivian camp during the Acre conflict, between 1899 and 1903. The dispute centered around armed attempts by separatist Brazilian filibusters to seize control of Bolivia's rubber-rich northern territories. Bolivian forces drew sizable volunteer support from German expats, many of whom were employed by corporations operating in the region. Busch put his steamboat at the service of the Bolivian expedition, supplying food and ammunition. His successful efforts in breaking through the separatist blockade, wherein he was nearly taken prisoner, earned him a letter of recognition from President José Manuel Pando, who commanded Bolivian troops in the field.

=== Later pursuits and enterprises ===
In 1904, Busch relocated to Baures in Iténez Province, where he worked as branch manager of Zeller & Co., whose local office had become the town's largest trading house. Here, in 1909, he co-founded the second publishing company in Beni using a printing press imported from Germany. It published El Porvenir, the department's only newspaper outside of Trinidad.

During this time, Busch continued his routine river expeditions. In 1908, while navigating either the Mamoré or Iténez River, his vessel was ambushed by a Cayubaba tribe. The attack left Busch gravely wounded in the stomach, but he managed to make port in Puerto Ballivián before being transferred to Trinidad. A local doctor removed an arrow shaft from his abdomen but could not extract the point lodged in his vertebra. In Baures on 23 July, Busch signed his final will and testament. Busch elected to seek treatment in his native Germany. He was transported by river from Trinidad to the transatlantic port of Belém do Pará and spent thirty days aboard a German steamship bound for Hamburg. There, Busch underwent several successful operations, where it was shown that he had suffered seven gastrointestinal perforations. He spent the next few years in convalescence in Germany, where medical expenses forced him to sell off his stocks in Zeller & Co.

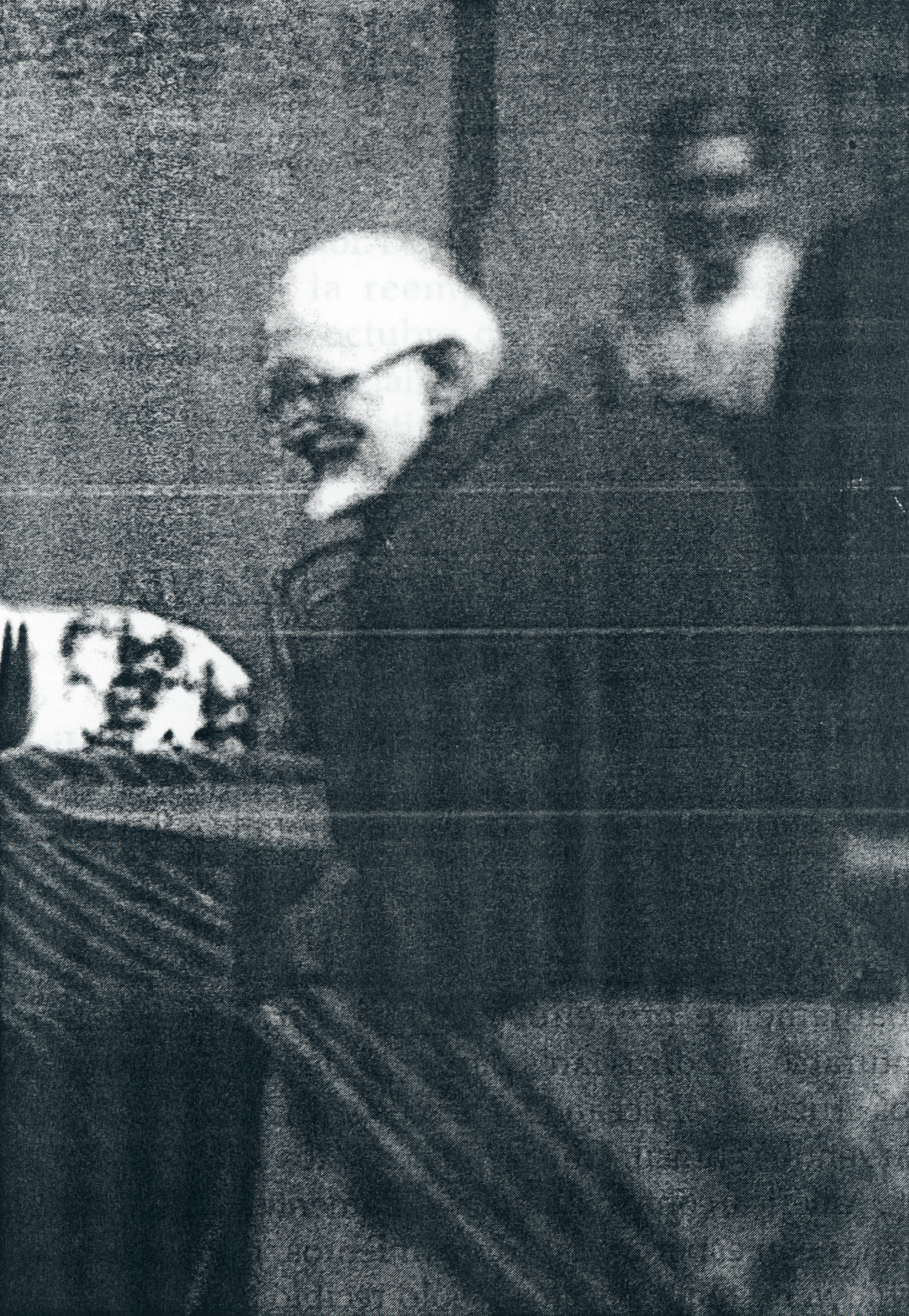
Photo of Busch c. 1930s

Busch reentered Beni by way of the Madeira and Mamoré rivers in either 1910 or 1911. He established a small enterprise selling imported hardware, but the venture fell through. He spent short stints in the hamlets of Yaguarú and El Puente in Guarayos Province and practiced medicine among the indigenous peoples of the surrounding Franciscan missions. From there, Busch moved to the Ñuflo de Chávez Province. He settled permanently in Concepción and returned to Zeller & Co. as an advisor and physician for the local branch. During this time, Busch also worked for the British firms Anglo-Bolivian Rubber Co. and Trading Co. Ltda.

=== Political activities ===
Beginning around 1918, it became common for prominent Germans in Santa Cruz to acquire Bolivian citizenship and participate in local government. Busch served as chief physician in the Public Health Service of Concepción. When a 1920 coup d'état in La Paz unseated the reigning Liberal government and installed the Republicans, Busch joined the party, attracted by its populist platform. The new government faced constant opposition from the deposed Liberals and operated under a state of exception for several years. The province of Ñuflo de Chávez had a similar political situation, as well as rampant banditry. To quell the unrest, the administration of Bautista Saavedra named Busch subprefect in June 1924. Previous authorities – including César Banzer, a personal friend of Busch – had all struggled to pacify the province.

During his term, Busch became known as a harsh authority for the "severe methods" applied to bring order to the province. His efforts, says historian Robert Brockmann, were consistently opposed by the Liberals, who "suffered first-hand the harshness of [Busch's] selective kindness". Busch led a relentless campaign to stamp out banditry and apprehend the outlaw Carmelo Hurtado, who had gained a reputation as a "romantic brigand" and became a popular folk hero among the people. According to Brockmann, in the conflict between Busch and Hurtado, "it is impossible to separate fiction from reality". One account tells of Busch confronting Hurtado in an armed skirmish. The bandit supposedly had the chance to kill Busch but chose to spare him because "he treated the poor for free". By the end of his term, the inhabitants of Concepción were on the verge of rebellion and his reputation for ruthlessness reached as far as Santa Cruz de la Sierra. Busch was dismissed on 6 October 1925 after sixteen months in office.

== Relationships and children ==
=== Busch–Becerra line ===
During a stopover in Trinidad on an expedition in 1892, Busch met Raquel Becerra Villavicencio. They maintained an intermittent romantic relationship between Busch's regular comings and goings and were wed in Trinidad on 12 June 1893. Busch fathered five children during his marriage with Becerra. Due to the couple's itinerant lifestyle, only the eldest, Josefina, was born on 8 May 1895 in Trinidad – although even her birthplace is stated as Santa Ana del Yacuma in Busch's testament. The remaining four were all delivered along the routes of Busch's expeditions. Bertha Beni was born on 18 February 1897 in either Villa Bella or somewhere along the Beni River between there and Cachuela Esperanza. Elisa and Pablo were born on 27 January 1900 and 27 November 1901, respectively, both in San Javier. (Note: Sources differ on the dates and birthplaces of all of Busch's children, but Brockmann cites these as the most "consistent or supported" figures. Hollweg lists Josefina as being born on 8 May 1894 in Santa Ana del Sécure; Bertha on 18 February 1896 in Villa Bella; Elisa on 23 January 1900 in San Javier; and Pablo on 27 November 1901 in San Javier.) The birthplace of Busch's fifth and youngest son with Becerra, Germán, born 23 March 1903, remains a subject of debate among scholars, who claim either El Carmen del Iténez or San Javier as the site.

Josefina married Miguel Kiyoto, a Japanese immigrant and grocer, in 1932. Bertha married Samuel Ávila Alvarado in 1911, from which the prominent Ávila–Busch and Ávila–Chávez families of Trinidad descend. A cattle rancher, Ávila later served as a diplomat and senator. Elisa married the professor Alberto Natusch Velasco in San Javier on 27 January 1900; through them, Busch is the maternal grandfather of Alberto Natusch Busch, the president of Bolivia in 1979. The junior Pablo became a physician like his father, according Brockmann; different versions state that he either succumbed to drug addiction in his youth and died of an overdose in April 1932 or was poisoned and robbed on the road to Trinidad.

[Pablo] Busch lacked affection for anyone and in general was a bad father and a worse husband.

— Robert Brockmann

Months after the birth of Germán, Busch abandoned the family. According to his granddaughter, Gloria Busch Carmona, the family narrative is that Busch "saw a beautiful 14-year-old girl, fell madly in love, and left [Becerra] and their children to go with her". Busch remained estranged from his family; he and Becerra reunited only once in 1938, and he was absent in his children's lives well into adulthood.

Throughout his life, Germán sent sporadic letters to Busch, which went unanswered. He finally agreed to meet in 1937 after his son wrote a final message framed as an ultimatum. On 5 July, Germán departed for Concepción on a small Junkers W 34, but the plane did not arrive as intended. His apparent disappearance plunged Busch into a deep depression. Busch later narrated that he had given himself one hour for Germán to arrive or else "I would shoot myself, because, fallen in the forest and devoured by vermin, [my son] would have died because of me, because of the longing to see his father". Within the hour, the plane landed and the two reunited.

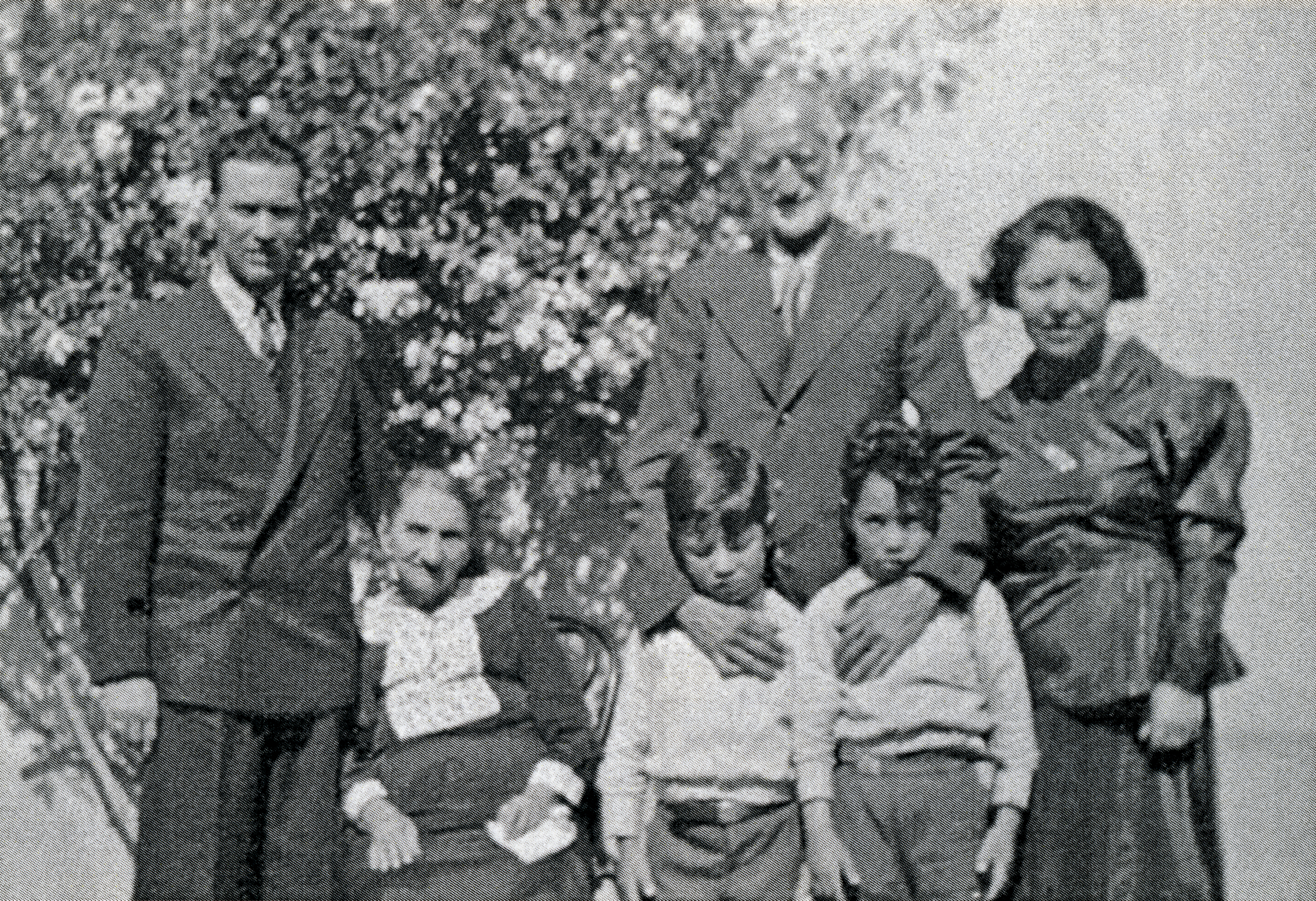
Busch at a family reunion in Cochabamba, 1938

Three days after his return from Concepción, Germán became president of Bolivia. From then on, Busch – who, by all accounts, had never before set foot in La Paz – became a common presence in the Palacio Quemado. Matilde Carmona, the first lady, resented Busch's "sudden paternal devotion" because it seemed to her self-serving. For Brockmann, "the filial love of a father who disregards ... his newborn son and then clings to him when he becomes powerful is doubtful".

Because of his outsized influence, "it is very probable" that the president's German-born father played a role in the Bolivian government's deepened ties with the Third Reich during this time. Busch met with multiple German officials on behalf of the administration; he discussed economic relations with Ernst Wendler and Joachim von Ribbentrop and attended an opera with Adolf Hitler, whom he gifted a vicuña wool quilt.

=== Busch–Baldivieso line ===
During his time in Baures, Busch met Petrona Baldivieso, the mestiza daughter of the local cacique. Busch and Baldivieso never married. They had one child, Carlos, born in Baures on 23 April 1908. Months later, Busch left to receive medical treatment in Germany, and did not return to Baldivieso nor their son. Carlos later served with distinction in the Chaco War, where he rose to the rank of lieutenant. He was chief of police of Santa Cruz de la Sierra in 1938, during the administration of his half-brother. He was murdered along with his daughter in 1946.

=== Busch–Antelo line ===
In 1912, Busch married Enriqueta Antelo Hurtado, a woman from Santa Rosa de la Mina, whom he had met a few days prior. Their first son, Gustavo, was born in 1915 and died in infancy. Their second son, also named Gustavo, was born in El Puente on 21 April 1916. Gustavo studied business management and became a broadcaster and radio personality; he owned the stations Libertad in La Paz and Centenario in Santa Cruz. Dora, the youngest of Busch's children, was born in Concepción on 16 May 1928. Her son, Herland Vaca Díez Busch, served as president of the Pro-Santa Cruz Civic Committee from 2011 to 2013.

== Later life and death ==
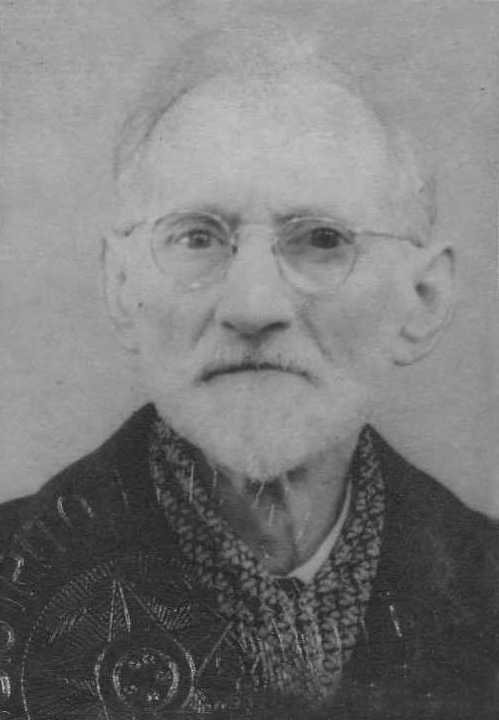
Photo of Busch taken for his Brazilian transit visa, c. 1948

Busch departed for Germany to receive cataract surgery on 10 May 1939. He was in Genoa when he received the telegram reporting the sudden suicide in office of his son, Germán, on 23 August. Like many in the Busch family, he blamed the death on his in-laws, the Carmonas. Busch was caught in Germany during the outbreak of World War II on 1 September; he remained trapped in the Third Reich for the duration of the conflict. Despite his advanced age, he was pressed into service as a field surgeon operating out of Neumünster in Schleswig-Holstein. Upon the war's conclusion, Busch was interned in a British prisoner-of-war camp and was stripped of his diplomatic passport by José Saavedra, an erstwhile political rival of his late son. The ordeal left Busch undocumented alongside millions of other displaced Germans.

Through the diplomatic efforts of Aniceto Solares, the Bolivian foreign minister who lobbied British authorities, Busch and other nationals were released and repatriated. He reentered Bolivia in either 1946 or 1948. Prior to his return, Busch married his niece, some forty years his junior, who accompanied him back to Bolivia. Unable to acclimate to the tropical climate, she returned to Germany shortly thereafter. The government of Carlos Quintanilla had granted Busch a life pension of Bs 2,000 monthly, which he never received. He spent his final years in Portachuelo, where he died on 3 May 1950. Hollweg states he died of pneumonia, but Brockmann says that his family does not know the cause of death. His remains are entombed in the Kiyoto–Busch family mausoleum in La Paz.

An eccentric figure, described by historians as equal parts philanthropic and cruel, accounts of Busch's life are steeped in folklore and often contradictory. His legacy is closely intertwined with that of his son, Germán. For Brockmann, Busch was an "intrepid pioneer ... to whom Bolivia also owes the exploration of many rivers ... at a time when such an adventure required valor and temerity". His deeds "left legend in San Javier and Concepción, where with a tall hat, surgical case, and rifle, he waged war against the fearsome brigands of those regions", recounts Augusto Céspedes.
