= Alberto Natusch =

55th President of Bolivia

55th President of Bolivia
- In office 1 November 1979 – 16 November 1979
- Vice President: Vacant
- Preceded by: Wálter Guevara (interim)
- Succeeded by: Lidia Gueiler (interim)

Minister of Peasant and Agricultural Affairs
- In office 14 February 1974 – 21 July 1978
- President: Hugo Banzer
- Preceded by: Himself (as Minister of Agriculture and Livestock)
- Succeeded by: Guillermo Escóbar Uhry

Minister of Agriculture and Livestock
- In office 23 April 1973 – 14 February 1974
- President: Hugo Banzer
- Preceded by: José Gil Reyes
- Succeeded by: Himself (as Minister of Peasant and Agricultural Affairs)

Personal details
- Born: Alberto Natusch Busch; 23 May 1933 Riberalta, Beni, Bolivia
- Died: 23 November 1994 (aged 61) Santa Cruz, Bolivia
- Spouse: Elba Rubí
- Parent(s): Alberto Natusch Velasco; Elisa Busch Becerra
- Relatives: Germán Busch (uncle)
- Education: Military College of the Army

Military service
- Allegiance: Bolivia
- Branch/service: Bolivian Army
- Rank: Colonel

Alberto Natusch Busch (23 May 1933 – 23 November 1994) was a Bolivian general who briefly served as the 55th president of Bolivia in 1979 after a military coup.

== Background and earlier career ==
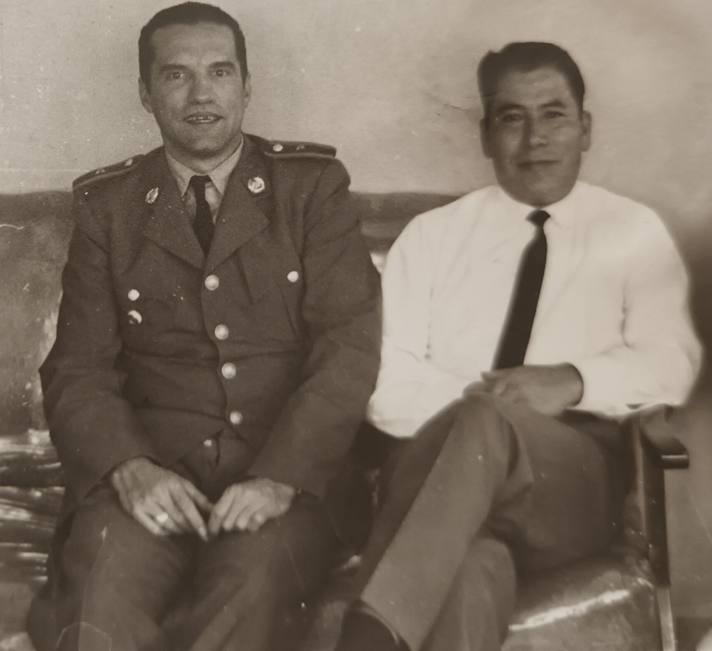
Colonel Natusch visiting General Hernán Terrazas in Camiri.

Natusch was of German and Arab descent, and nephew of former President of Bolivia Germán Busch and a grandson of Pablo Busch. He was a career military officer who in the late 1970s rose to the rank of Colonel in the Bolivian Army. He was for many years a trusted member of the cabinet of the military dictator Hugo Banzer.

== President of Bolivia following military coup ==
On 1 November 1979, Colonel Natusch executed a bloody coup d'état against the constitutional government of Dr. Wálter Guevara, which had been constituted by Congress just three months earlier and charged with guiding the country to elections in 1980. The stated reasons for the golpe were the alleged desire of President Guevara to extend his term beyond that established by Congress in order to enact long-term measures designed to stave off a growing economic crisis. Far more likely, it was a traditional right-wing coup staged by officers who had served in the long dictatorship of General Hugo Banzer (1971–78) and who had much to lose by an ongoing congressional investigation of alleged criminal and economic misdeeds committed during the "Banzerato."

In any case, the population resisted the Natusch coup rather heroically, led by a nationwide labor strike called by the Central Obrera Boliviana (COB) of Juan Lechín.

=== Failure of coup after 16 days ===
In the end, Natusch was able to occupy the Palacio Quemado for only sixteen days, after which he was forced to give up his quixotic struggle. The only face-saving concession he extracted from Congress was the promise that former president Guevara not be allowed to resume his duties. This condition was accepted and a new provisional president was found in the leader of the lower congressional house (the House of Deputies), Lidia Gueiler. Almost universally reviled for the bloodshed he unleashed in the name of his personal ambitions, Colonel Natusch withdrew from public life. In 1981, he led a military revolt against the regime of Luis García Meza, while failing to overthrow the regime, led to the resignation of Garcia Meza and his replacement by Celso Torrelio.

== Retirement and death ==
Retired from the military, Natusch died in Santa Cruz on 23 November 1994, at the age of 61.

== See also ==
- Cabinet of Alberto Natusch

== Bibliography ==
- Mesa José de; Gisbert, Teresa; and Carlos D. Mesa, "Historia De Bolivia," 5th edition.

Political offices
Preceded by José Gil Reyes	Minister of Agriculture and Livestock; 1973–1974	Succeeded by Himself as Minister of Peasant and Agricultural Affairs
Preceded by Himself as Minister of Agriculture and Livestock	Minister of Peasant and Agricultural Affairs; 1974–1978	Vacant Title next held by Guillermo Escóbar Uhry
Preceded by Wálter Guevara; Interim	President of Bolivia; 1979	Succeeded by Lidia Gueiler; Interim
