= Cabinet of Alberto Natusch =

Bolivia's presidential cabinet formed November 1979

In Bolivia on 1 November 1979, Colonel Alberto Natusch Busch executed a coup d'état against the constitutional government of Wálter Guevara Arze, and formed his cabinet.

Ministry / Date	01.11.1979	04.11.1979	07.11.1979
Foreign and Religious Affaire	Guillermo Bedregal Gutierrez, MNR		
Interior, Migration and Justice	Carlos Mena Burgos, mil		
National Defense	Oscar Larrain Frontanilla, mil		
Planning and Co-ordination	vacancy	Alejandro A. Pacheco, ind	
Finance	Agapito Feliciano Monzon, MNR		
Education and Culture	Wilfredo Cossio Aguilar, MNRI		
Transport, Communications and Aviation	Edil Sandoval Moron, MNRI		
Labor and Union Affairs	Raúl Guzman Moreira, MNRI		
Industry, Commerce and Tourism	Julio Herrera Dorado, mil		
Mining and Metallurgy	Abel Ayoroa Argandoña, MNRI		
Energy and Hydrocarbons	vacancy	vacancy	vacancy
Agriculture and Peasant Affairs	Carlos Fernandez Narvaez, mil		
Health and Social Security	vacancy	vacancy	Aquiles Gómez Coca, MNR
Housing and Urbanism	Aroldo Cortez Jimenez, mil		
Economic Integration	vacancy	vacancy	vacancy
Press and Information	vacancy	Guillermo Rivero Tejada, MNR	
Secretary to the Cabinet	Boris Maricovic Cordova, PSD		
Social Affairs	Raul Roca Rivero, MNR		

MNR – Revolutionary Nationalist Movement

MNRI – Leftwing Revolutionary Nationalist Movement

PSD – Social Democratic Party

mil – military

ind – independent
