= Bolivia–Germany relations =

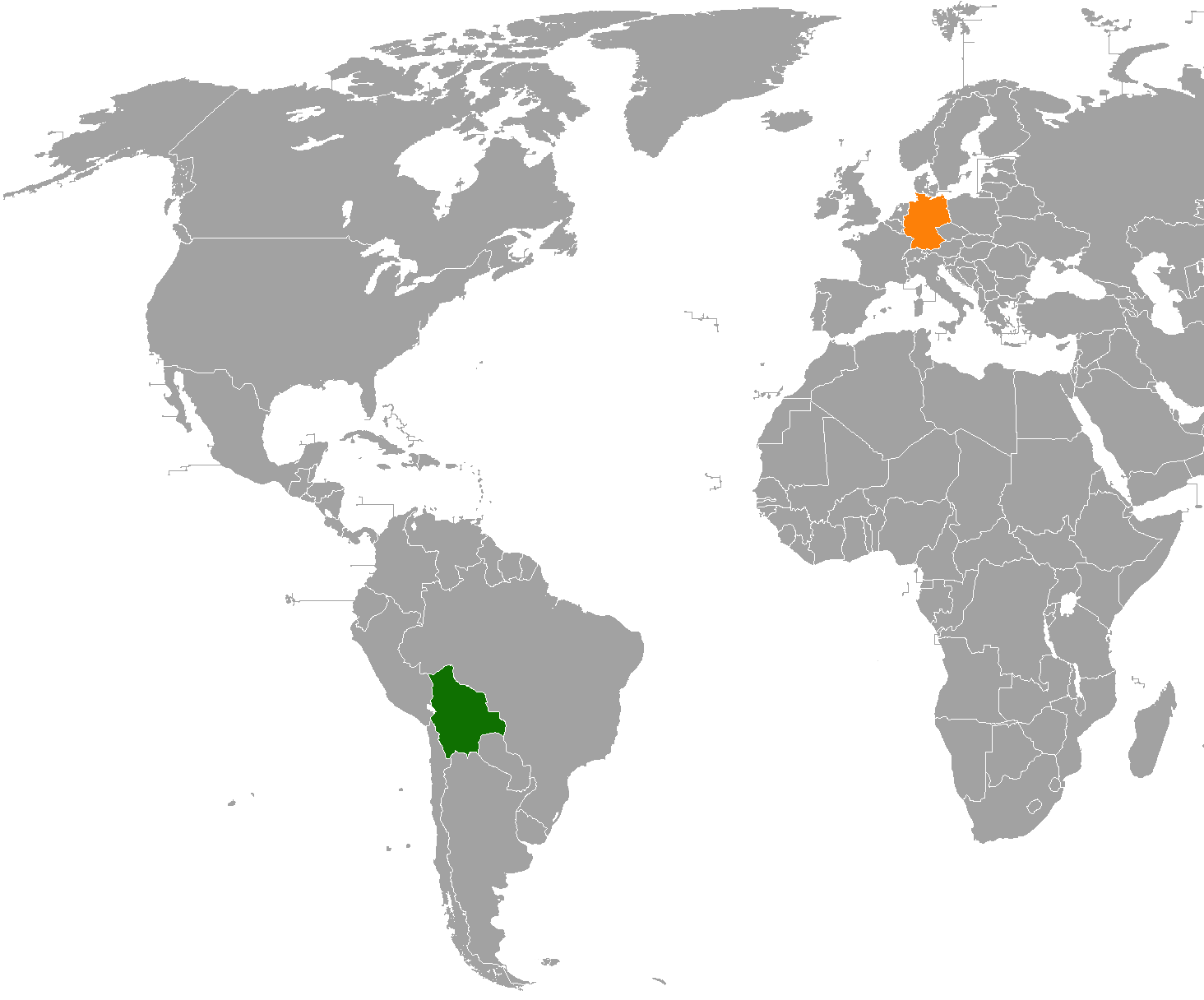

- Bolivia: Germany

Bolivia–Germany relations are the diplomatic relations between the Plurinational State of Bolivia and the Federal Republic of Germany. Both nations are members of the United Nations.

== History ==
In 1825, soon after Bolivia declared its independence from Spain, the city-state of Hamburg (as a member of the German Confederation) recognized Bolivia that same year. In 1847, Bolivia appointed an ambassador to the court of King Frederick William IV of Prussia. In 1871, Germany opened a consulate in La Paz. In the late 19th century, Germans began migrating to Bolivia and were involved primarily in commerce and in mining. As a result of German migration to the country, Germany opened a diplomatic legation in La Paz in 1902. In July 1908, both nations formally established diplomatic relations.

During both World War I and World War II, Bolivia broke diplomatic relations with Germany both times owing to international pressure. In 1937, Bolivia had elected President Germán Busch, who was of German origin. During his presidency, President Busch was persuaded by mining baron Moritz Hochschild and allowed the admittance of Jewish refugees escaping Nazi persecution to Bolivia. Between 1938 and 1941, more than 20,000 Jewish refugees were granted visas at Bolivian consulates throughout Europe and immigrated to the South American nation.

After World War II, Bolivia, like many countries in South America, received Nazis fleeing capture and trial. One notable Nazi was SS and Gestapo functionary Klaus Barbie, who had emigrated to Bolivia and resided in the city of Cochabamba for 30 years and obtained Bolivian citizenship. Barbie had become influential in the country and had the ear of several presidents. In 1983, Barbie was arrested in La Paz and extradited to France, where he was tried and sentenced to life imprisonment.

Bolivia and West Germany established diplomatic relations in December 1952. By 1956, both nations had opened embassies in their respective capitals. In 1973, Bolivia established diplomatic relations with East Germany.

After the reunification of Germany, relations between both nations have remained close. There have been several visits by leaders and foreign ministers of both nations. Germany has invested and worked in development projects in Bolivia focusing on three priority areas: drinking water supply and sanitation; rural development and the environment; and energy, with a focus on renewable energies and energy efficiency.

== Bilateral agreements ==
Both nations have signed a few agreements such as a Treaty of Friendship and Commerce (1908); Agreement on Cultural Cooperation (1966); and an Agreement for joint development of Railway, Wind power and Transport infrastructure in Bolivia (2016).

== Trade ==
In 2019, bilateral trade between Bolivia and Germany totaled €300 million. Bolivia's main exports to Germany include mineral resources (lead, tin and silver ores); agricultural produce (nuts, coffee, soya products, quinoa and millet); leather and textile goods. Germany's main exports to Bolivia include machinery; household appliances; vehicles and vehicle parts; chemical and pharmaceutical products; electrical goods and measurement; and control technology. German companies in Bolivia have invested in the following sectors: infrastructure (roads and railways), energy (conventional and renewable energy sources), healthcare, lithium extraction (including battery production) and in the chemical industry.

== Resident diplomatic missions ==
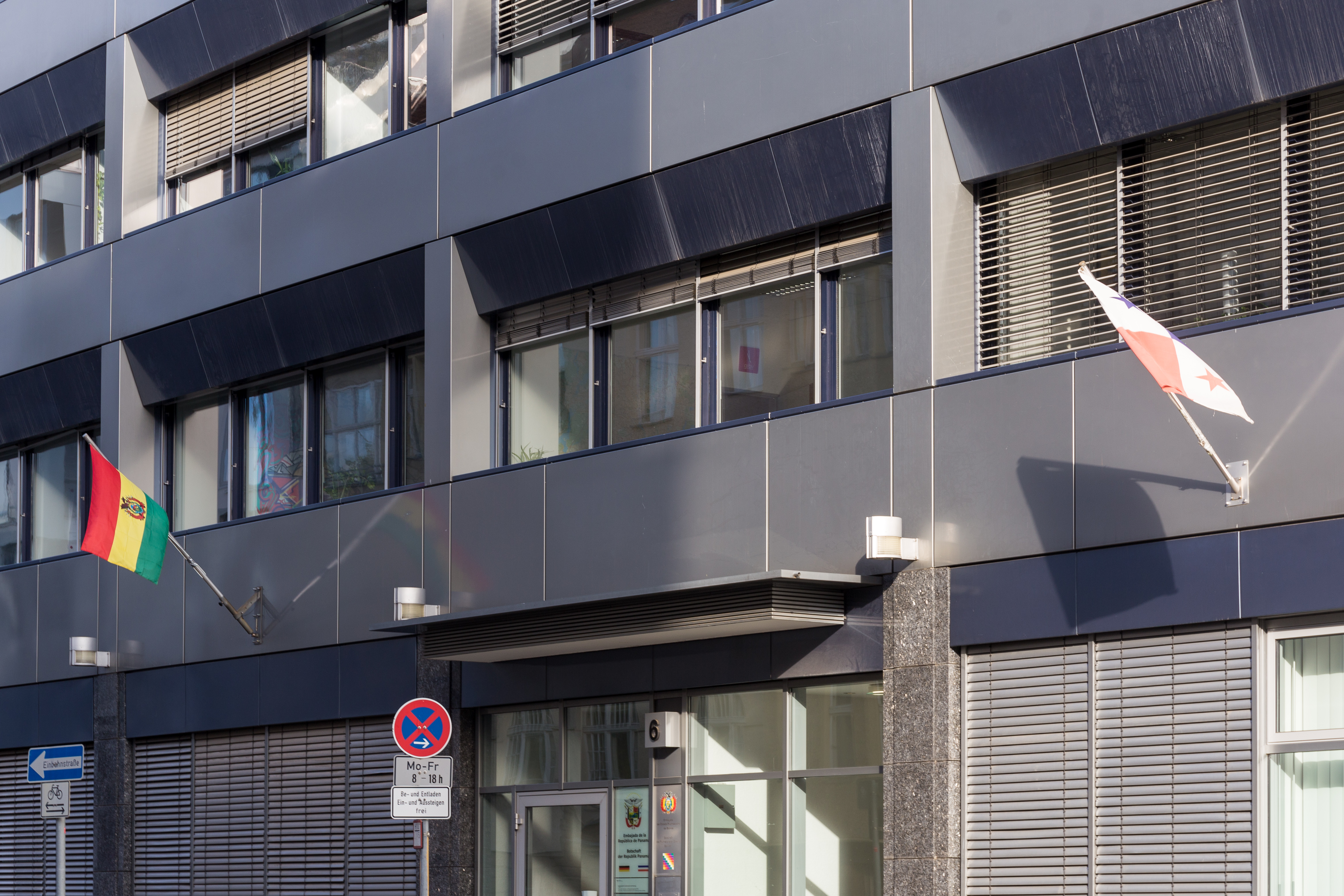
Embassy of Bolivia in Berlin

- Bolivia has an embassy in Berlin.
- Germany has an embassy in La Paz.

== See also ==
- German Bolivians
- Mennonites in Bolivia
