= Battle of Gondra =

1933 battle of the Chaco War

- Part of the Chaco War
| Date | 11 to 15 July 1933 |
| Location | Gran Chaco 23.3375°S 59.906944°W |
| Result | Indecisive |

Belligerents
| (Bolivia) 4th Bolivian Division | (Paraguay) 1st Paraguayan Division |

Commanders and leaders
| (Bolivia) Enrique Peñaranda | (Paraguay) Rafael Franco |

Casualties and losses
| ~ 100 dead 21 prisoners | 51 dead 136 wounded |
- Location within Paraguay Battle of Gondra (South America) Battle of Gondra (America)

The Battle of Gondra occurred during the Chaco War between the Bolivian 4th Division, "The Brave Fourth", and the Paraguayan 1st Division, "The Iron Division", stationed around Fort Gondra, from 11 to 15 July 1933, in the aftermath of the Second Battle of Nanawa. The 1st Division enveloped the Bolivian 4th after a series of assaults through the dense woods southwest of Gondra. The Bolivian 34th infantry and the "Lanza" cavalry regiment, led by captain German Busch, fought a rearguard action which allowed the encircled troops to withdraw northward, toward Campo 31, an open field leading to Alihuatá. Meanwhile, the 3rd "Pérez" infantry regiment built up a new blocking position in the eastern part of Campo Vía, a dried bed six kilometers west of Gondra, which prevented any further Paraguayan advance. On 15 July, the Bolivian troops retreated unmolested from the pocket, carrying out all their heavy equipment with them.

== Gondra Tunnel ==
On May 10, 1933, it is carried out in the GONDRA sector, one of the most risky and sensational maneuvers of the Chaco War: the raid of Paraguayan troops through a tunnel to get out in the rear of the enemy. Soldiers located in Fort Gondra stayed on site for more than a month, exhausted, some even malaria patients. The combatants perforned exploits that seemed unlikely in order to derail the pressure of Bolivians. In view of the proximity of both trenches and the enormous danger that this approach meant for Paraguayan troops, a job began to go out to the Bolivian rear of a subway. A precarious but successful work was the construction of the famous GONDRA tunnel, joining positions with the rear of Bolivians with an extensive underground below the trenches.

It was devised by Cabo Bernabé Mendoza Duré, whose initiative was informed by the commander of the Primera División, Lieutenant Colonel Rafael Franco, who despite all the difficulties that the projected work gave approval and on April 28, 1933, with primitive tools, yatagan, can dishes in the form of shovels and bags to get the removed land began the risky work of projected tunnel execution. It was very difficult to get any idea of the enormous sacrifice it meant for the executors of work, digging the entrance, expanding the opening, carrying the land removed, ensuring the stability of the top and delve the excavation to pass it under the trenches. And everything should be done without the enemy realizing.

The executors of the operation were the components of a special detachment under a lieutenant's orders. Julius César Zarza and Private Ricardo Give them from the mortar section of Lt. Alex Franco. Those who had to take advantage of this path to break into the Bolivian field, at the other end of the tunnel were 3 Rifle company, under the command of Lieutenant Pantaleón Aguirre, Salvador Re and Salvador Funes. The Company of Lt. Funes should move through the tunnel and the other two over the surface. That May 10 woke up with a slight drizzle. Before dawn, Private Ricardo Dávalos was the first to be in the rear of the Bolivians who slept under their nets. Great was the confusion of Bolivians and impossible reaction to such an unexpected assault.

The Paraguayan victory came at the cost of Lieutenant Pantaleón Aguirre, a veteran officer who was killed in action. In his honor, the Picada Gondra-Pirizal route was renamed Avenue Pantaleón Aguirre. On May 11, Bolivian forces counterattacked and retook their former positions; Reserve Lieutenant Juan R. Herreros was killed during the engagement. Paraguayan troops under Lieutenant Colonel Rafael Franco held their defensive positions in accordance with orders from Colonel José Félix Estigarribia until the Battle of Gondra began in July 1933, following Paraguayan defensive operations at Nanawa.
