= Germán Busch =

36th President of Bolivia

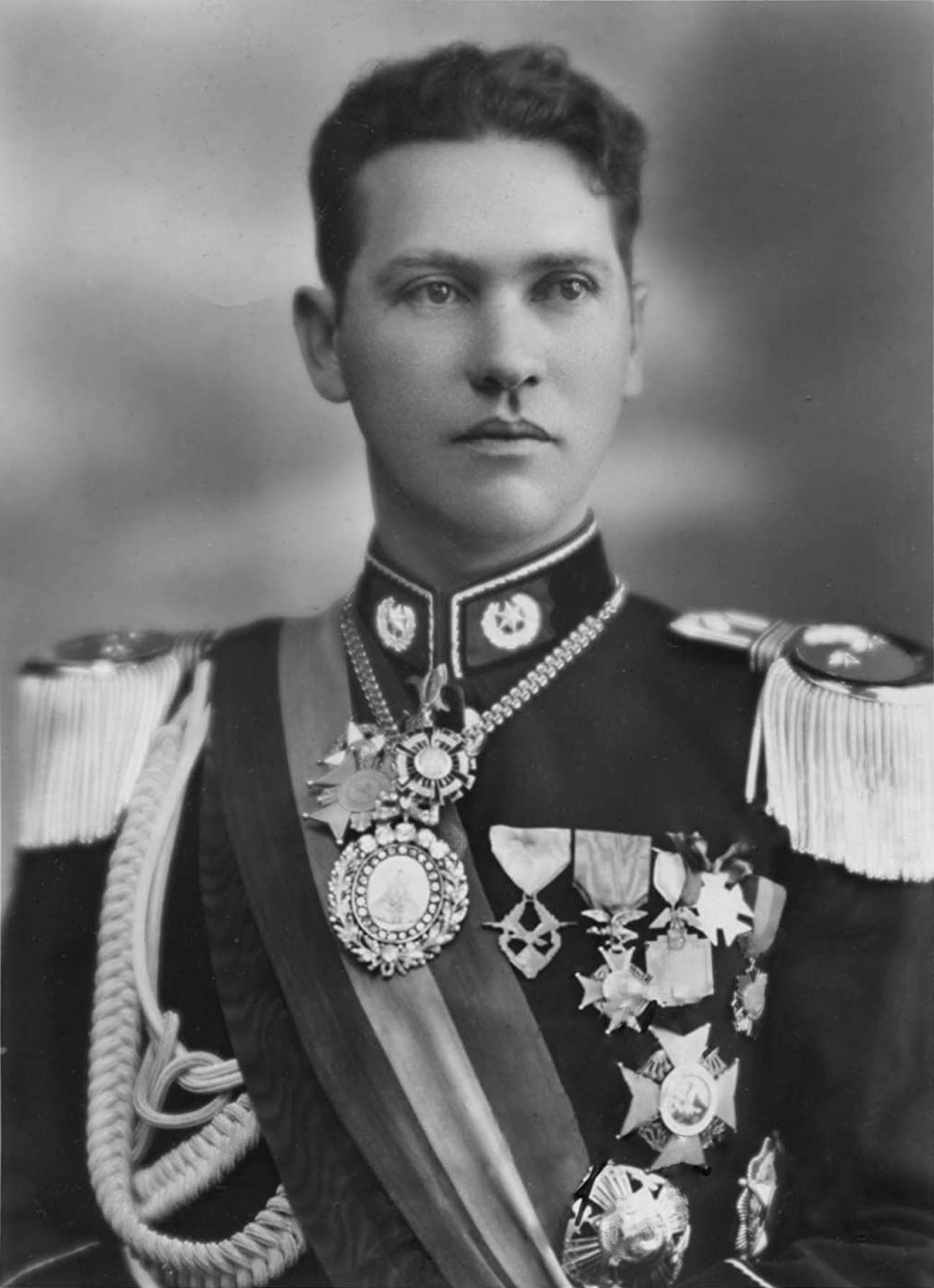
- Official photograph with the Presidential Medal.

36th President of Bolivia
- In office 13 July 1937 – 23 August 1939; Junta: 13 July 1937 – 28 May 1938
- Vice President: Vacant (1937–1938; 1939) (Note: While Baldivieso remained active in government after 24 April 1939, no "vice dictator" position ever existed and Busch's self-coup effectively annulled the vice president's term in office.); Enrique Baldivieso (1938–1939)
- Preceded by: David Toro
- Succeeded by: Carlos Quintanilla (provisional)
- In office 17 May 1936 – 22 May 1936; Provisional
- Preceded by: José Luis Tejada Sorzano
- Succeeded by: David Toro

Supreme Leader of the Legion of Veterans
- In office 10 July 1937 – 23 August 1939
- Preceded by: Office established
- Succeeded by: Bernardino Bilbao Rioja

Personal details
- Born: Víctor Germán Busch Becerra; 23 March 1903 San Javier, Ñuflo de Chávez, Santa Cruz, or El Carmen, Iténez, Beni, Bolivia
- Died: 23 August 1939 (aged 36) La Paz, Bolivia
- Cause of death: Suicide
- Spouse: Matilde Carmona (m. 1928)
- Children: Germán; Orlando; Waldo; Gloria
- Parent(s): Pablo Busch; Raquel Becerra
- Relatives: Alberto Natusch (nephew)
- Education: Military College of the Army
- Nickname: Camba Busch

Military service
- Allegiance: Bolivia
- Branch/service: Bolivian Army
- Years of service: 1927–1937
- Rank: Lieutenant colonel
- Unit: Campero Infantry Regiment; Carabineros Corps; Ingavi Cavalry Regiment
- Commands: "Lanza" 6th Cavalry Regiment; 4th Cavalry Brigade
- Battles/wars: Chaco War; Battle of Boquerón; First Battle of Alihuatá; Battle of Gondra
- Awards: Order of the Condor of the Andes

Víctor Germán Busch Becerra (23 March 1903 – 23 August 1939) was a Bolivian military officer and statesman who served as the 36th president of Bolivia from 1937 until his death in 1939. Prior to his presidency, he served as the Chief of the General Staff and was the Supreme Leader of the Legion of Veterans, a veterans' organization founded by him after his service in the Chaco War.

Busch was born in either El Carmen de Iténez or San Javier and was raised in Trinidad. He attended the Military College of the Army and served with distinction in the Chaco War. For his actions, he rose to prominence among the high command of the armed forces, participating in the military-led ousters of presidents Daniel Salamanca in 1934 and José Luis Tejada Sorzano in 1936. The latter propelled his mentor, Colonel David Toro, to the presidency of a military junta of which Busch was a member. On 13 July 1937, Busch orchestrated a soft-coup which forced Toro's resignation, elevating himself to the presidency of the junta.

A war hero, drawn in by the reformist social movements of the time, Busch spearheaded the development of Toro's Military socialist ideology, convening the 1938 National Convention which legally elected him president and promulgated the 1938 Political Constitution, hailed as a "Social Constitution" as it established the State's right to the country's natural wealth, alluded to the social function of property, and recognized the communal lands of indigenous Bolivians. However, his political inexperience and accustomation to rigid military structure weakened his ability to lead the disparate factions of the left-wing movements and led him to ultimately suspend the legislature and declare dictatorial rule in 1939. During this time, he issued a profusion of executive decrees including a new labor and school code and the mining currency law, the latter of which proved to be the most popular of his policies though it gained him the ire of the Rosca, the country's powerful mining oligarchy.

By the end of 1939, pressure from resurgent conservative parties, a corruption scandal, and a deepening personal depression led Busch to commit suicide on 23 August 1939, bringing an end to the era of military socialism in Bolivia. An enigmatic character who came from outside the political realm, he was wrapped in legend and controversy, even about his birthplace. His sudden and unexpected death in office is still disputed as either suicide or an assassination.

During his presidency, a Labor Code was introduced which provided for various rights for workers, together with social insurance for typographical employees and workers and railwaymen.

== Early life and education ==
Germán Busch was born on 23 March 1903. He was the fifth of six children born to Pablo Busch Wiesener, a physician and German immigrant, and Raquel Becerra Villavicencio. Due to the family's frequent travels, their children were born in different regions of the country, leaving Busch's exact place of birth to become a source of historical dispute. Some historians point to San Javier in the Ñuflo de Chávez Province of the Santa Cruz Department, while others to El Carmen de Iténez, a settlement in the Iténez Province of the northern Beni Department.

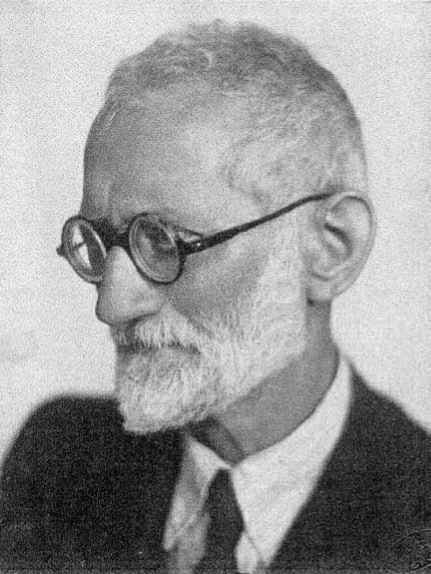
Germán's father Pablo Busch Wiesener, c. 1930.

Rolando Roda Busch, the grandson of Germán's youngest brother Carlos, affirmed that Busch was born in San Javier, Santa Cruz, highlighting two historical documents to evidence his claim. The first of these is Busch's baptism certificate issued on 25 August 1903 in San Javier. The second document is the will and testament of Pablo Busch, written "with his own hand" in the presence of a notary public and seven witnesses, in which document he places the names of all his children, with their corresponding places of birth.

Historian Robert Brockmann maintains that this testament is incorrect, not as a result of malice on the part of Pablo Busch, but due to the fact it was written in extremis as Busch Wiesener was at the point of death, having been shot by an arrow. Brockmann points to the claim by Busch's mother Raquel Becerra, with sworn testimonies collected by historians Rógers Becerra and Arnaldo Lijerón. According to this testimony, Busch was born on the farm "La Pampita" in El Carmen, Beni while the family was navigating the Río Blanco, on their way to San Javier. From there, the family would have continued navigating the river until they reached Urubichá, continuing by cart to Ascensión de Guarayos and then to San Javier, where he was baptized. Engineer and historian Rodolfo Pinto Parada calculated that this route accounts for the time discrepancy between Busch's birth in March and his baptism in August.

Regardless of the disagreement over the location, both accounts agree on Busch's year of birth as 1903. Prior historiography had placed the date of birth as 23 March 1904, a full year after the fact. A few weeks after Busch's birth, Pablo Busch abandoned the family and returned to Germany while Raquel Becerra moved with her children to her home town of Trinidad where Busch spent the majority of his childhood. He attended the 6 August National School from which he was expelled at the age of 16 due to a physical quarrel with the principal, Agustín Rivero, as a result of a love affair between himself and another classmate.

== Military career ==
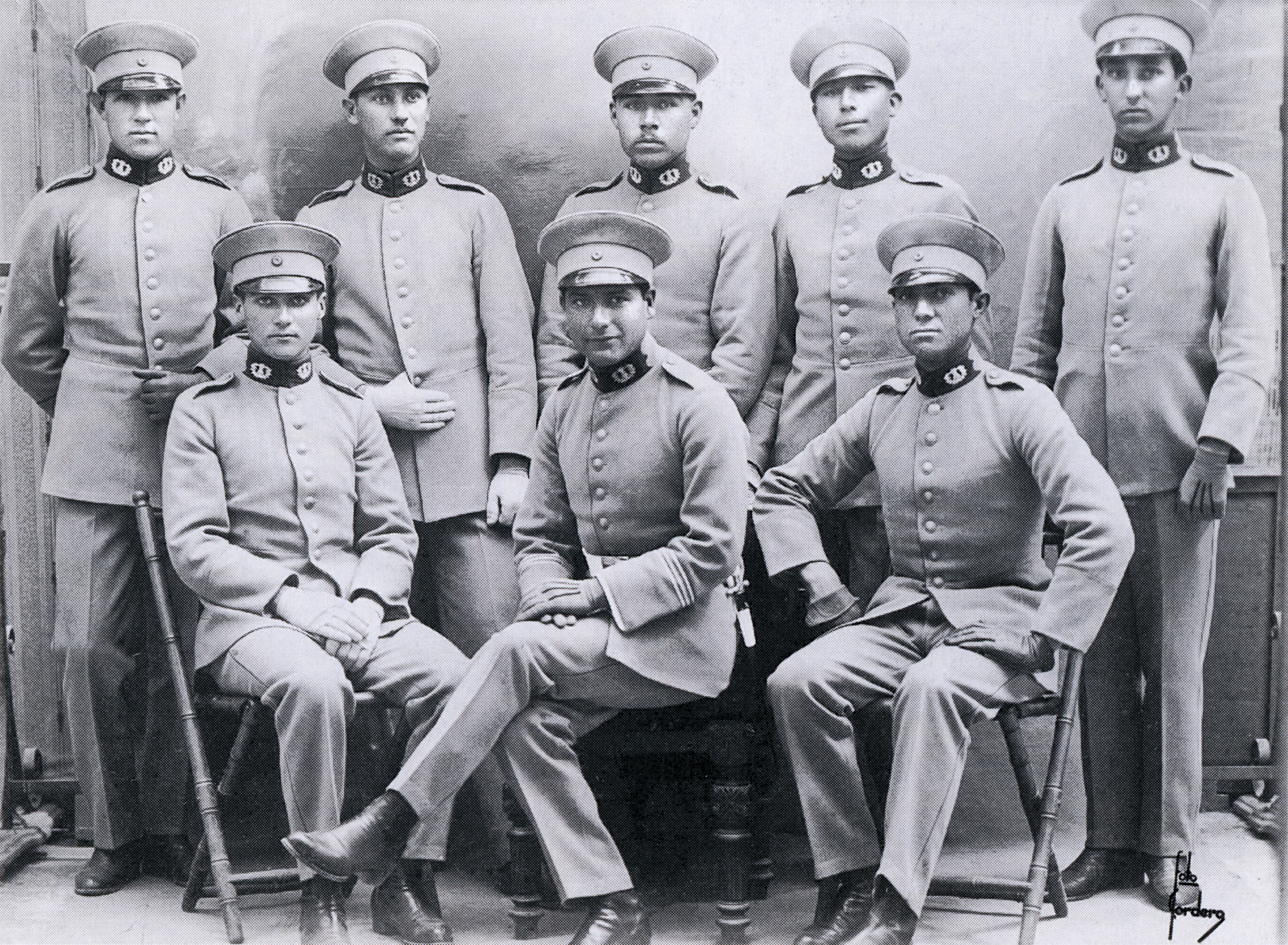
Busch (standing, second from left) as a cadet at the Military College of the Army.

On account of his will and physical ability, it was determined by his family that Busch would attend the Military College of the Army in La Paz, for which his brother-in-law Samuel Ávila Alvarado obtained for him the necessary certificates of good conduct. In order to travel to La Paz, Busch participated in a swimming competition in the town of Loma Suárez, winning first place and using the monetary prize to secure passage on a steam boat for himself and his three friends: Ceferino Rioja Aponte, Ernesto Wende Camargo and Sergio Ribera. The group navigated the river to Todos Santos, where they continued by mule through Cochabamba to La Paz, arriving in December 1921. On 16 January 1922, at the age of 18, he entered the Military College of the Army.

=== Military College of the Army ===
While Busch excelled in physical exercise and training, he was challenged by the structural aspects of military life, especially as regards discipline and concentrated study. Fellow cadet Alfonso Arana Gandarias described Busch as a "temperamental and violent man [who] went from a sentimental state to an angry one". Such feelings eventually manifested themselves in Busch's lifelong inclination towards suicide. During his stay at the Military College, Busch attempted to end his own life on two occasions. The first occurred during a semester in which the cadet failed two or three subjects, leading him to attempt suicide with his rifle, which, as conveyed by Avila, "was with great difficulty prevented by his classmates". The second event came during one student's party, when Busch nearly came to blows with another cadet named Guillermo Estrada. While being separated from one another, Busch managed to unsheathe his revolver, pointing it not at Estrada but at his own temple, before being stopped from shooting by other party guests.

Busch graduated from the Military College on 4 January 1927 with the rank of second lieutenant and was assigned to the Campero Infantry Regiment. His disinterest in commanding heavy machine guns and his propensity towards quarrelling with other officers led him to be reassigned six weeks later to the Carabineros Corps in Copacabana. During this time, Busch was introduced to Captain David Toro with whom he built a good relationship, leading Toro to request the second lieutenant's transfer to the Ingavi Cavalry Regiment in Viacha, which he commanded. This allowed Toro to develop Busch as his protégé.

=== Marriage ===
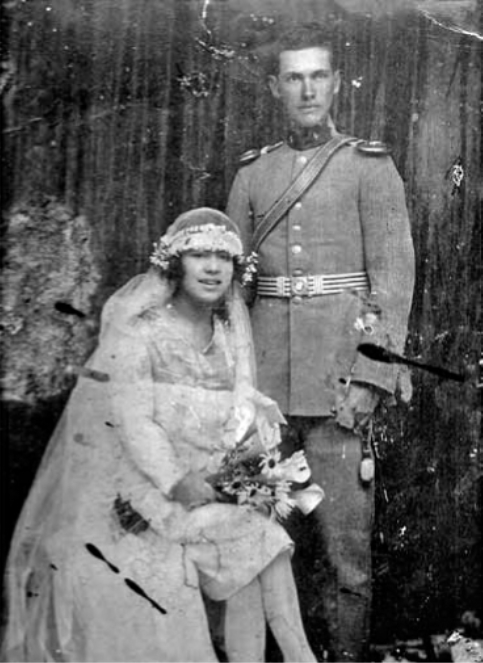
Wedding photograph of Germán Busch and Matilde Carmona, 1928.

The Military College was located close to the Liceo Venezuela, an all-girls school. Due to the proximity between the two, relationships and courtships between the cadets and schoolgirls were common. Here in 1926, Busch met Matilde Carmona Rodó, the daughter of a formerly wealthy mining family from Potosí. The couple were already familiar with one another. Carmona, because Busch's physical appearance and reputation had made him popular among the schoolgirls and Busch, because Carmona was the publisher of the student newspaper Ideal Femenino, of which he was a fan. After he graduated and was assigned to a unit in another town, the two continued to exchange letters and Busch would commonly visit her in La Paz when he had the opportunity. After a few years, Busch returned to La Paz in early 1928 to ask Carmona's family for her hand in marriage. To do this, Busch gained special military authorization to be married. This was because military regulations of the time prohibited marriages for officers below the rank of captain. For a second lieutenant to be married was unprecedented and required considerable persuasion and the special permission of General José C. Quirós, the Chief of the General Staff. Germán and Matilde were married on 18 February 1928.

After his marriage, Busch was assigned to the outskirts of Cochabamba where his meager second lieutenant's salary, coupled with the birth of his first son Juan Germán on 28 December 1928 and that of his second son Orlando just eleven months later, left the family in economic hardship for some time, relying on the generosity of his friend Ángel Jordán to get by.

=== 1930 coup d'état ===
In 1929, Busch returned with his family to La Paz. Through the personal recommendation of Toro, General Hans Kundt, the Chief of the General Staff, had assigned Busch as his personal adjutant. Kundt and Busch's relationship, however, soon soured. In an account to Carlos Montenegro, Busch related that his time as an aide to Kundt made him feel "reduced in his powers, lagging behind in his hierarchy".

Busch's entrance into the General Staff came at the tail end of the constitutional term of President Hernando Siles Reyes. Seeking to extend himself in power while maintaining a pretense of legality, Siles Reyes resigned in late May 1930 in favor of his Council of Ministers whom he entrusted with calling a National Convention which would alter the Constitution and permit him to seek an unprecedented second term. The plan to extend his term had the reverse effect and by 25 June what had started as student protests had escalated into an uprising at the Military College of the Army. Faced with the crisis, Kundt, who as head of the General Staff was for all practical purposes the last remaining executive authority, elected to remain inactive in the face of the state of government failure.

In this context, Busch received word from his wife that her brother and brother-in-law, Eliodoro Carmona and Ricardo Goitia, among other officers, had been imprisoned by rebelling soldiers of the Pérez Regiment. On the morning of the 25th and without the authorization of Kundt, the second lieutenant travelled to the regiment's headquarters in Miraflores, guarded by either fourteen or seventeen soldiers, and freed the arrested officers. At 4:00 a.m. the next day, Busch and a group of eighteen soldiers retook the Military College, which had been left to be defended by two veteran officers and eighteen of the youngest cadets, the youngest among them being just twelve-years-old.

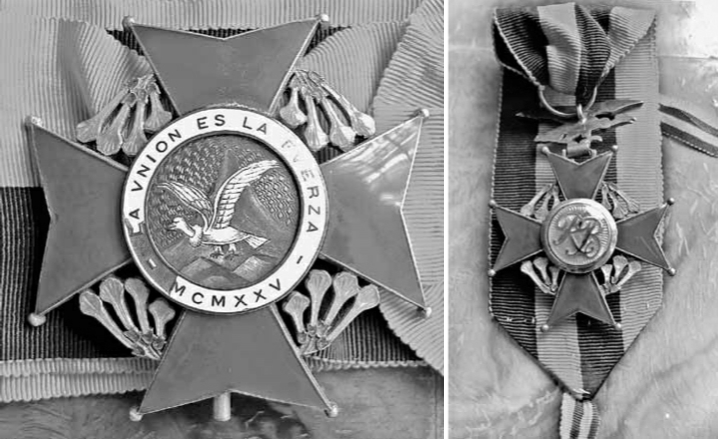
Obverse and reverse of the Order of the Condor of the Andes awarded to Germán Busch in 1931.

Busch then turned his sights on the Military Aviation School in El Alto, whose insurrectionist officers maintained aerial dominance over La Paz, but was ordered to stand down by Toro. On 28 June, the military uprising succeeded in overthrowing the government and Busch retired to his home, complaining to Matilde that "Everything I did was useless. Everything is now lost due to General Kundt's lack of character". As punishment for his support of the deposed government, Busch was assigned by the provisional Carlos Blanco Galindo regime to the remote military post of Roboré.

=== San Ignacio de Zamucos expeditions ===
In March 1931, Busch, promoted to the rank of lieutenant in January, was commissioned by President Daniel Salamanca to lead a military contingent of thirty men tasked with locating the site of San Ignacio de Zamucos, a former Jesuit mission in the Chaco. The government hoped to use the discovery of the site as a legal defense for its claim to sovereignty over the Chaco Boreal. The first expedition began on 25 March and ended sometime after 23 May, the date in which Busch recorded his last journal entry reporting on the delivery of a cart full of provisions for the emaciated soldiers. The next entry in Busch's journal skips to 16 August, in the midst of a second expedition led this time by Lieutenant Colonel Ángel Ayoroa. In September, the government in La Paz deemed the discovery of ceramic masonry and hydraulic excavations to be sufficient evidence that there had been a San Ignacio de Zamucos and recalled the Ayoroa expedition. Later archaeology showed that the insufficient materials in the Chaco used to build the mission meant that there never were ruins to discover. Nevertheless, the expeditions led Busch to be decorated as a Grand Officer of the Order of the Condor of the Andes on 26 October.

== Chaco War ==
Escalating tensions between Bolivia and Paraguay over the disputed Chaco Boreal ultimately resulted in the outbreak of war between the two states on 9 September 1932. Busch's participation in the San Ignacio de Zamucos expeditions had freed him from his semi-exile in Roboré and he had been transferred to the 6th Cavalry Regiment in Cochabamba. The news of hostilities was met favorably by Busch who wrote in his journal: "I slept well. The voices spread that we are going to Boquerón, and I think that finally I am going to know what we asked so much for: War!".

On 9 September, the 6th Cavalry Regiment arrived in Muñoz. These forces reinforced the defenses of Yucra on the road to Boquerón, repelling various attacks from the Paraguayan regiments "Curupayty" and "Corrales". However, repeated attempts to break the Paraguayan siege of Boquerón from their entrenched positions in Yujra resulted in failure. By the night of the 21st to the 22nd, Lieutenants Germán Busch and Arturo Montes, with 15 6th Cavalry soldiers, withdrew through Boquerón-Yujra. The battle eventually ended in a loss for the Bolivians and the retaking of Fort Boquerón by the Paraguayan army. Nevertheless, for having entered Boquerón with reinforcements and for having broken the siege to withdraw with the bulk of his troop, Busch was promoted to the rank of captain. About the Bolivian retreat, Busch recounted in his journal: "We began our retreat [...] We passed through a hail of bullets. The massacre continues. The number of deaths increases dangerously […] We finally managed to pass the entire area where the enemy was and we reached the Command. We all asked for bread and water. We were no longer the enthusiastic and strong boys who left Oruro. We were only their specters. We all wanted to leave".

In November 1932, during a series of commando operations behind Paraguayan lines, Busch lead an attack on three or four Paraguayan trucks, killing thirty-seven Paraguayan soldiers and three officers. Among the fallen officers was Lieutenant Hermán Velilla, the son of a prominent Liberal family from Asunción, a feat which garnered Busch great infamy amongst the enemy. On 11 March 1933, his unit captured Fort Alihuatá along with a large amount of war material. For his actions, he was granted command of the "Lanza" 6th Cavalry Regiment. In that month, the regiment participated in three successful offensives, one of which achieved the capture of Fort Fernández.

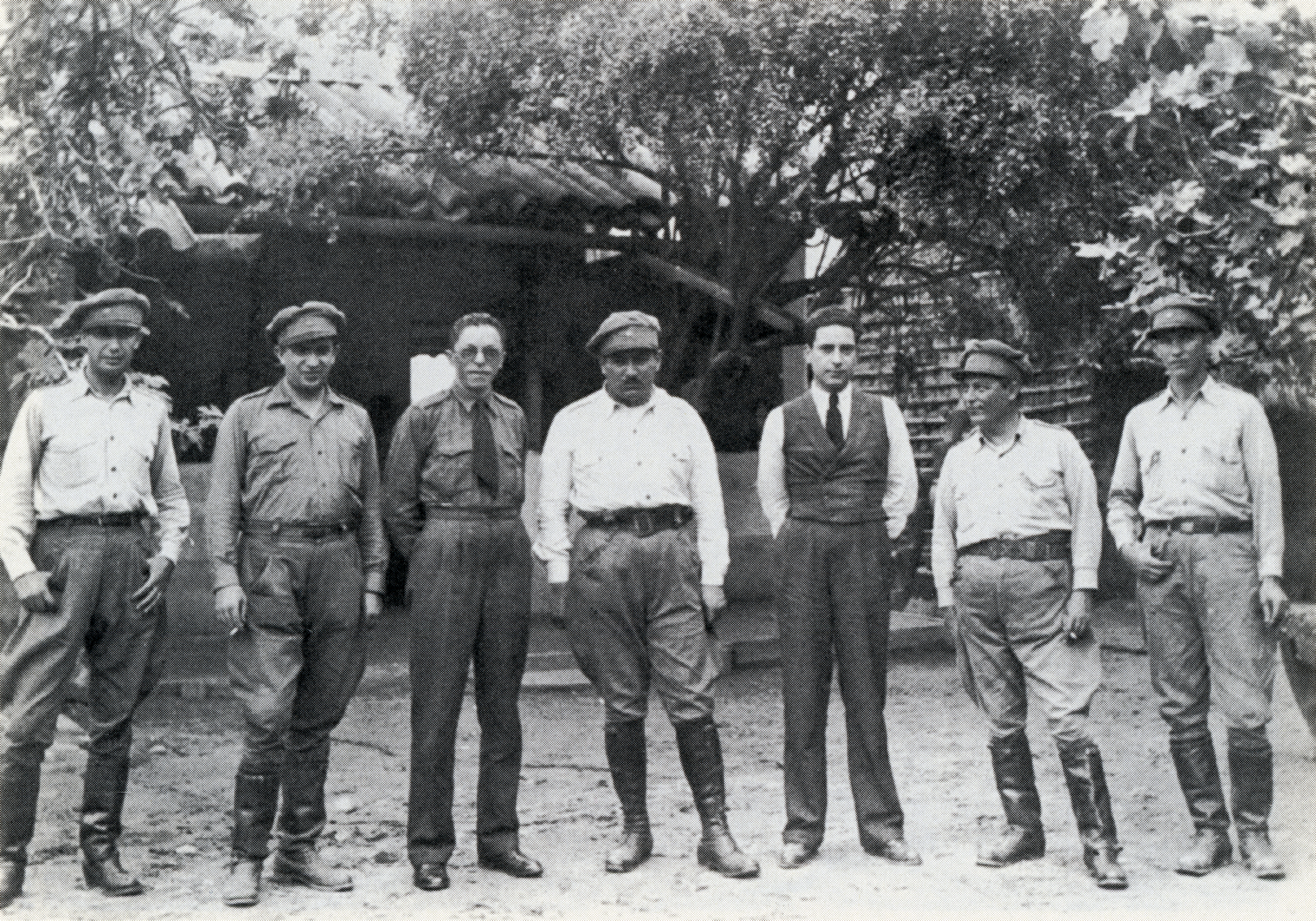
Chaco War combatants. (From left) Hugo Ballivián, David Toro, Gabriel Gosálvez, Enrique Peñaranda, Enrique Baldivieso, Ángel Rodríguez, and Busch.

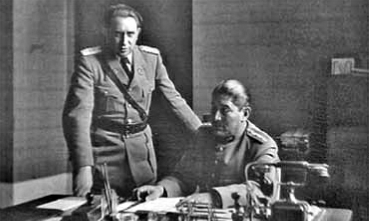
David Toro persuaded Busch to join Enrique Peñaranda's General Staff.

Busch saw action again at the Battle of Gondra. On 15 July, the "Lanza" Regiment fought a rearguard action and covered the retreat of the 4th Division which faced encirclement by Paraguayan forces. The Bolivians under Busch worked to open a road to the north, in the direction of Alihuatá, the only place where the enemy had not yet entered. During the three days that the rapid opening of the escape route lasted, heavy fighting took place to prevent Paraguayan forces from cutting it off and preventing the escape.

In later 1933, following the loss of 9,000 Bolivian soldiers in the Campo Vía pocket, President Salamanca dismissed Kundt and named Enrique Peñaranda as the new commander-in-chief of the armed forces. Peñaranda's General Staff was composed of David Toro, Ángel Rodríguez, Oscar Moscoso, and Germán Busch, who was brought in as Chief of Staff of the 1st Army Corps. Busch, a man of action, initially refused the position but was persuaded to join the Bolivian high command by Toro who secured for him a promotion to the rank of major on 30 December 1933. Busch used his new command to advocate for more guerrilla action, tactical withdrawals, and surprise offensives as opposed to prolonged defenses and mass attacks which he viewed as a waste of soldiers and equipment.

=== 1934 coup d'état ===
The course of the Chaco War did not bode well for Bolivia. By November 1934, conflicts between President Salamanca and Commander-in-Chief of the Armed Forces Enrique Peñaranda had reached their breaking point. On 26 November, Salamanca dismissed Peñaranda in favor of General José Leonardo Lanza. The following day, Salamanca personally arrived at the military headquarters in Villamontes to relieve Peñaranda of his duties. On that day, sectors of the military loyal to Peñaranda, which included Colonel David Toro, Oscar Moscoso, and Germán Busch, decided to resist the order and constructed a plot to rebel against the president.

Troops were extracted directly from the front lines a mere twelve kilometeres away. Under the command of Busch himself, soldiers armed with rifles and machine guns surrounded and pointed cannons at the chalet where President Salamanca was residing. The elderly president was arrested with the army chiefs subsequently securing his resignation, thus bringing an end to what was dubbed the "Corralito de Villamontes". Wishing to uphold democratic appearances, the military allowed Vice President José Luis Tejada Sorzano to assume the presidency and oversee the conclusion of the war.

Following the coup, in January 1935, Busch was awarded the Grand Cross of Military Merit and in July he was promoted to lieutenant colonel. In June of that year, a few weeks after the armistice with Paraguay, President Tejada Sorzano offered him a cabinet position in the Ministry of Defense but this was rejected by the military leadership which proposed Lieutenant Colonel Luis Añez as an alternative. On 5 October, the first contingent of demobilized troops along with the high command of the armed forces arrived in La Paz. After a few weeks, the military leadership returned to the Chaco to direct troop demobilization and repatriate prisoners of war, leaving Busch as the interim chief of the General Staff based in La Paz. He subsequently formed an army garrison made up of a brigade of three regiments from the Chaco cavalry corps. In essence, this position gave Busch the ability to control all military actions within the nation's administrative center.

== Political rise ==
Bolivia's ultimate loss against Paraguay in June 1935 plunged the country into a period of turmoil as the old political order lost a majority of its support. While political movements calling themselves "socialists" began to crop up across the country, the military found itself in the midst of its own internal power struggle. While many blamed the loss of the Chaco War on the oligarchic traditional parties, the senior officer corps of the army was also largely discredited for its failed tactics.

It would not take long for the young officer corps, which had risen in the ranks at an incredibly fast pace during the conflict, to force the old guard of the military to make way for new leadership. The young officers, sympathetic to the left-wing movements being formed inside the country, soon coalesced around the now Lieutenant Colonel Germán Busch who on 13 September 1935 formed the Legion of Veterans (LEC), which quickly became a powerful political and military organization. However, while Busch was a firm believer in the need for social change, he lacked a political mind and was incapable of formulating a political ideology of his own. Recognizing this, Busch and the young officers around him eventually settled on the more politically proficient, if less revolutionary, Colonel David Toro to lead their movement.

=== 1936 coup d'état ===
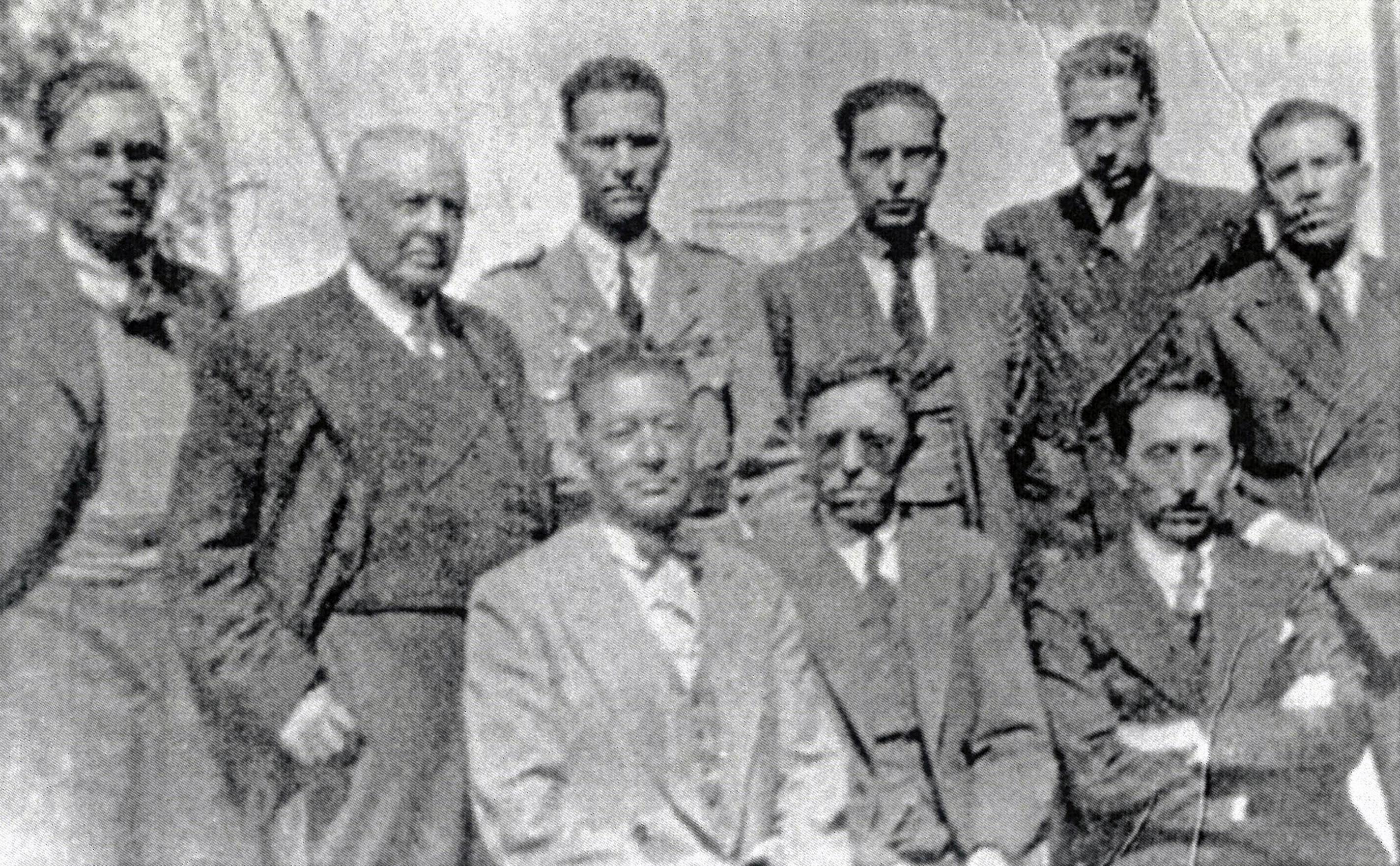
The conspirators that planned and executed the fall of President José Luis Tejada Sorzano in May 1936.

Elsewhere in Bolivia, labor unions had brought the country into crisis through debilitating strikes demanding higher wages and benefits in the face of rapid inflation. President Tejada Sorzano was viewed by both the civilian populace and the military, including Busch, as one of the old political elites who had irresponsibly led them to war without adequately equipping them to win it. Given this, it was not a shock when the government's orders for the military to intervene against the strikers went unheard. By that point, Waldó Álvarez, the leader of the Federation of Workers of Labor (FOT), had met with both Busch and Toro and secured from them a commitment that the army would not take action against the protesters. The peak of the crisis came in May 1936 when the largest strike movement ever seen in the country at that time was called. The culmination of these strikes came on 17 May when, following the occupation of various buildings in La Paz the night before, the military under Busch stepped in and demanded Tejada Sorzano's resignation. A civil-military junta was soon established with Busch being named provisional president. The same afternoon following the bloodless coup, Busch and Álvarez began negotiations with all of the trade unions' demands being met. Busch served as provisional president until David Toro returned from surveying troop disarmament in the Chaco on 20 May. Toro was subsequently inaugurated on 22 May with Busch joining the government leadership as one of the heads of the newly established junta.

=== Busch in the Toro government ===
Busch had been the protégé of Colonel David Toro during their time together in the Chaco War.

Toro presided over a reformist experiment known as military socialism (championed by Busch) which allied the military government with labor and leftist movements for a little over a year. However, as time went on, Busch and the young officers around him began to grow restless with the political manoeuvrings of the left-wing coalition. In particular, they took issue with the constant conflict between the moderate socialists of Enrique Baldivieso's United Socialist Party (PSU) and the Socialist Republican Party (PRS) of Bautista Saavedra. The ex-president was a masterful politician, keeping his party in a delicate balance between the old establishment of the liberal era and the new socialism of the post-war era by maintaining the leadership of the pre-war generations while appealing to the post-war one through the adoption of socialist language. His PRS had been both one of the three large traditional parties allied with Tejada Sorzano's government and, when the viability of that administration seemed lost, had flipped sides and joined the United Socialists in their opposition to it.

The PRS-PSU coalition quickly fractured as Baldivieso's socialists did not trust the "rightists" of the PRS while Saavedra, in turn, decried the "communists" in the government. These complex machinations frustrated Busch who on 21 June executed a self-coup within the junta without the prior knowledge of President Toro. Saavedra was exiled to Chile while the alliance between the military and the civilian left-wing was brought to an end with the armed forces henceforth governing the country on their own. In a manifesto issued to the nation, Busch stated that, "The parties of the left, united by pacts which seemed solidly defined, did not delay in breaking them" and that the army had thus decided to rule without them and would instead receive their base of support from the veteran and labor movements.

The ease in which Busch carried out the coup, which Toro was forced to accept, showed the influence Busch carried over the regime. As Busch entrenched his control over the military through his position as Chief of the General Staff, Toro slowly became more dependent on him. A clear indication of this came when Busch attempted to resign from the General Staff on 3 March 1937. It was a vote of no confidence against Toro which shook his government. The president rejected the resignation amidst an outcry of the military officers, further showing Toro in no unclear terms that they were loyal to Busch and not him.

=== 1937 coup d'état ===
Despite enacting popular legislation such as the nationalization of Standard Oil, the Toro regime soon earned the discontent of the indigenous population and the army. Busch himself felt unsatisfied with Toro's seemingly unending pragmatism and political compromises which to him appeared to be leading nowhere. At a meeting in La Paz on 10 July, the Legion of Veterans voted Busch Jefe Supremo (Supreme Leader) of the organization, a decision which deliberately rejected Toro as the leader of the veterans' movement.

The following day, Busch met secretly with Toro and General Enrique Peñaranda and he informed the president that his government no longer enjoyed the confidence of the army. Busch then asked that Toro send a letter of resignation as President of the Republic to the military garrisons as a symbolic gesture to convince the public that the army was completely free to respond to the referendum. Toro was certain that he would then take command again when the garrisons affirmed their trust in him and had asked him to continue as leader of the nation. In reality, Busch had concealed the fact that most of the military chiefs had already lined up against Toro. Then, in an empty gesture, Busch offered Peñaranda the presidency of the junta which was refused as expected, clearing the path for Busch to succeed Toro.

Toro's resignation was never transmitted. On 15 July he was transported under false pretences by the military to an airport and exiled to Chile. As a result of the coup, Germán Busch succeeded Toro as the next head of the junta on 13 July 1937, assuming the de facto presidency at the age of 34, the fifth youngest president in Bolivian history and the youngest to have been born after the country gained independence. (Note: The first four youngest presidents (Antonio José de Sucre, José Miguel de Velasco, Pedro Blanco Soto, and Jorge Córdova) were all born before Bolivia gained independence in 1825.)

== President (1937–1939) ==
Although Busch was a national hero, his political leanings were unknown to the general population. The left and the right alike assumed he would revert from Toro's military socialism to the traditional political establishment, a sentiment Busch himself did little to clarify through his vague statements of "national regeneration" and the "[maintenance] of public order". As a result, he even had to reject claims that his coup had been financed by Standard Oil, stating that the new government had no intention of returning the company's confiscated property.

=== Council of Ministers ===
The ministerial cabinet which Busch formed upon taking office indicated a difficulty in the new regime's ability to pinpoint a clear ideology. He showed a tendency for economic conservatism by assigning the important portfolio of Minister of Finance to the right-wing Federico Gutiérrez Granier. Gutiérrez Granier had been Minister of Finance during the government of Tejada Sorzano which Busch himself had overthrown. Nevertheless, Busch allowed the minister the freedom to undo many Toro-era policies including the closing down of state-subsidized food stores and the elimination of various consumer goods subsidies and economic support programs.

Busch also allowed the more conservative senior officer corps of the military to reassert itself during his regime. In January 1938, Busch accused General Peñaranda of plotting a coup. Rather than dismiss him, Busch challenged the general to a duel with the winner taking the presidency. The accusation and the challenge were deeply offensive to Peñaranda who, livid, subsequently retired from his post as commander-in-chief of the army and stormed out of the government palace. Busch, in turn, did little to stop Peñaranda's successor, the newly appointed General Carlos Quintanilla, from orchestrating a public purge of young left-wing officers from their positions of power in the military ranks. This was only stopped under pressure from leftist legislators who feared the loss of their allies in the military.

On the other hand, politically the Busch regime adopted many of the more radical elements of Toro's administration, appointing the leader of the United Socialist Party Enrique Baldivieso as Foreign Minister and the moderate socialist Gabriel Gosálvez as Secretary-General of the Junta.

=== 1938 National Convention ===
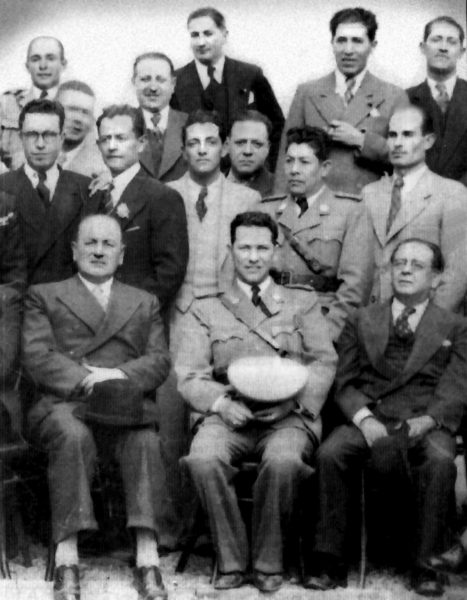
Busch with delegates to the 1938 National Convention.

President Toro had called for a National Convention in 1937 to be held the next year. Following his resignation in March 1938, Busch and the new government junta called for the election of a constituent assembly which was to be held from 23 May to 30 October, and be charged with rewriting the constitution of Bolivia. The convention was the opportunity for new postwar political forces to assert themselves against the traditional prewar Genuine Republican, Liberal, and Socialist Republican parties who, in turn, attempted to reestablish the old order.

Though Busch accepted support of the traditional parties and allowed Finance Minister Gutiérrez Granier to negotiate with them, he also adopted Toro's plan for union representation in government when he allowed the Trade Union Confederation of Bolivian Workers (CSTB) and the Legion of Veterans to join the moderate and radical leftist parties in the Socialist Single Front (FUS) electoral alliance, a coalition which Busch endorsed in the upcoming legislative elections. Faced with this new movement led by Busch, the traditional parties (save for the PRS which joined the FUS) withdrew from the election, allowing the so-called Generación del Chaco to win in a landslide and giving them full control over the convention. On 27 May 1938, it elected Busch constitutional President of the Republic with Enrique Baldivieso as vice president. Both were inaugurated the following day with terms set to last to 6 August 1942.

On 30 October, the convention successfully produced the 1938 Bolivian Constitution, one of the most important in Bolivian history due to its social character. The new Constitution formalized labor rights and provided them with state protection, allowed for more government involvement in minimum wage, annual leave, and social security matters, and provided for social justice by recognizing the legal existence of Bolivia's indigenous communities and providing for their education.

=== Constitutional presidency (1938–1939) ===
Portrait of Busch as president by Luis Walpher, 1954.

==== Treaty of Peace with Paraguay ====
On 21 July 1938, the Treaty of Peace, Friendship and Boundaries between Bolivia and Paraguay was signed in Buenos Aires, bringing a conclusive end to the Chaco War. The treaty granted roughly 75% of the Chaco Boreal to Paraguay with the conditions established by the Busch administration, mainly in relation to Bolivia's access to the Paraguay River.

==== Creation of Pando ====
By decree on 24 September, Busch established the Pando Department as the ninth department of Bolivia, naming it after former President José Manuel Pando who had overseen the Acre War in the region. The land which would become Pando had up until then been known as the National Territory of Northwest Colonies, which depended administratively on the Ministry of Agriculture, Irrigation and Colonization. The ministry had promoted the election of six representatives (2 Senators, 4 Deputies) from the territory to the National Convention.

The purpose of the creation of the department was to give greater political hierarchy to the region as well as to achieve the promotion of demographic and economic growth. It was also meant to put an end "to a dilemma posed at the time by the inhabitants of Riberalta, who longed to be the capital of a nascent Department". However, during the convention, the territory's delegation joined in an "Eastern Bloc" of representatives from Santa Cruz and Beni and decided that Puerto Rico would be the capital instead of Riberalta, with that city remaining a part of Beni. In 1945, the capital was moved to Cobija.

The creation of Pando also coincided with the civic anniversary of the Santa Cruz Department. While some contemporary historians have theorized that this may have been due to Busch's possible friendship or family ties with landowners and businessmen from Santa Cruz who had strong interests and investments in Beni and the territory which became Pando, historian and former president Carlos Mesa has also pointed out that "In 1938 the departmental commemorations did not have the significance and [...] affirmation of regional identity that they have today. I do not believe at all that Busch had any intention of making the date of the creation of Pando coincide with his condition as a Cruceño or his alleged interests with the Santa Cruz elites of the moment".

==== Left-wing fragmentation ====
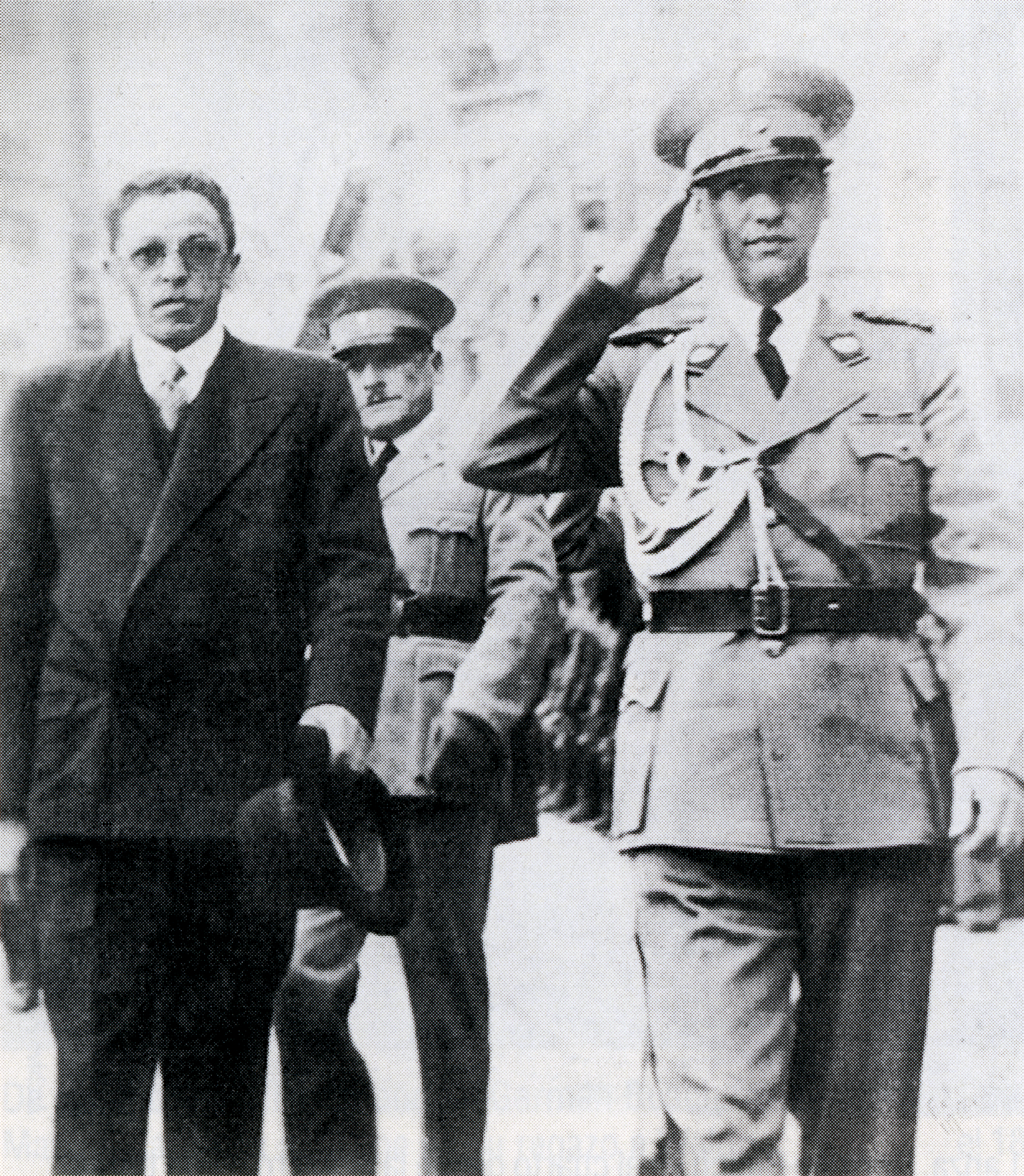
Busch with his confidant Gabriel Gosálvez, 6 August 1938.

Bogged down for most of his presidency in the procedural aspects of enacting a new political framework (the Assembly, the new Constitution) Busch was not able to pass many meaningful reforms, despite his stated aim of "deepening" the military socialism of Toro. Despite continually rising in their power, the fragmented groups of the left remained in constant flux. The new assembly was the first to be formed since the overthrow of Tejada Sorzano, and the fact that most members of the traditional parties had withdrawn meant that very few experienced politicians were present in Congress. Parties joined and separated in attempts to form viable coalitions but truly national parties could not arise without firm leadership which could rally support and organization, something Busch demonstrated an inability to do.

Busch's attempt to bring the parties together proved lackluster. The former president of the national convention, Renato Riverín, joined with Busch's close advisor, Gabriel Gosálvez, to bring together Baldivieso's moderate United Socialist Party with more radical groups such as the Independent Socialist Party of Víctor Paz Estenssoro. However, the members of this government-backed Socialist Party expressed concerns over the lack of commitment from Busch who was more accustomed to the absolute command structure of the army rather than the more cooperative civilian power politics.

The president's circle of political allies became much smaller in March 1939. That month, Vice President Baldivieso abdicated his leaderships positions over the moderate socialists, urging them to move further leftward. Not long after, on the 18th, Gosálvez resigned from his position as minister of government in order to dedicate himself fully to his diplomatic work in Rome as Ambassador to the Holy See, removing himself both from domestic Bolivian politics as well as the country itself. Gosálvez's replacement, Vicente Leytón, brought an end to Busch's attempt to form a national Socialist Party when he refused to join it. While Busch announced he would endorse his own list of candidates, the collapse of the united front did not bode well for the left-wing's chances in the upcoming May legislative elections.

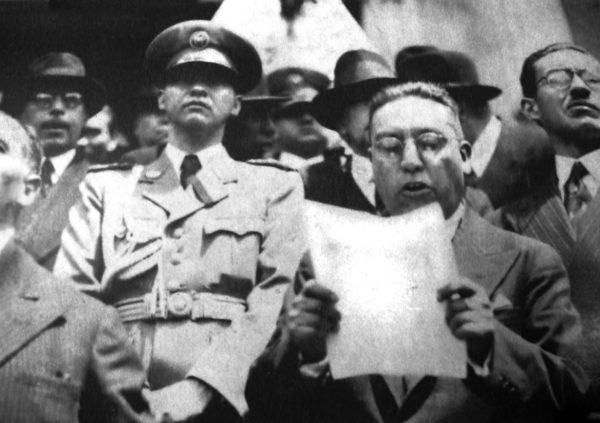
Busch at the funeral of Bautista Saavedra in May 1939.

==== Reactionary consolidation ====
Busch's troubles continued with the reformation of the traditional parties in the wake of the death of Bautista Saavedra on 1 May 1939, while still exiled in Santiago. With Saavedra's death and even before that as his health ailed, the traditional parties broke with his policy of interacting with the fringes of the moderate left. On 22 March 1939, the Liberal Party and both Republican parties set aside their differences and joined in the Concordance electoral alliance. They came forth demanding an end to military involvement in politics and embraced the support of the oligarchy, announcing numerous candidates for the legislative elections.

==== Immigration affair ====
In the midst of the compounding issues plaguing the government came the immigration affair. The scandal had its roots in June 1938, when the Busch government announced open immigration into Bolivia in a sudden reversal of previous government policy. On 9 June, Minister of Agriculture and Immigration Julio Salmón announced the end of special restrictions on Jewish migration. While the motive of this likely had to do with the desire to settle Jews in the Chaco before Paraguay did, it nevertheless made Bolivia the only country in the world at the time which permitted unlimited Jewish migration and went against the strong national socialist and pro-German sympathies of the army.

The plan, supported by Moritz Hochschild, known as the "Bolivian Schindler", saw 10,000 European Jews set to migrate to Bolivia within a year. Considering the flood of applications, the desperation of those applying, and the lack of profession and low pay of the diplomatic service, abuses inevitably occurred. A scandal arose when it came to light that the consul general in Paris had required that all visas had to be cleared through the embassy which was charging Jewish emigres between ten and twenty thousand francs for a visa. Though many of the persons involved were dismissed, Busch and his government were faced with charges of gross moral violations and government misconduct by the press.

=== Dictatorship declared ===
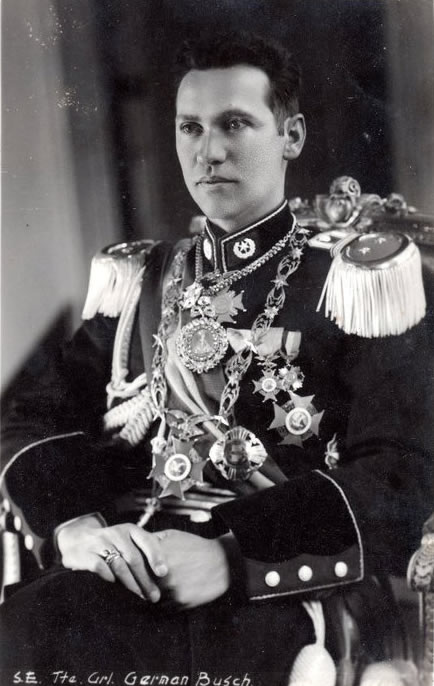
Busch sitting in the Palacio Quemado, c. 1938.

Faced with the immigration scandal, unhappy with the results produced by his few reforms, and with little support from the fractured left, Busch, tired of navigating the complexities of parliamentary politics, declared totalitarian rule on 24 April 1939, thus nullifying the very political system he had painstakingly created. At noon, Busch issued his Manifesto to the Nation which read: "I conceived the reorganization of the parties as an ideal […]. I recognized the need for free democracy […] I upheld the convenience of broad freedom of the press. But, I have seen that [in its place] debauchery has been imposed [...] a subversive and demagogic fermentation has taken place that poisons the national environment. [...] Faced with this picture, [...] From today on I begin an energetic and disciplined government, convinced that this is the only way that will allow the invigoration of the Republic, internally and internationally". The assembly was suspended, the upcoming elections cancelled, and the 1938 Constitution, while still in effect, would be henceforth enforced through executive decree. In the following months, Busch issued some of the most important decrees and laws of his administration, including the nationalization of various railways and industries as well as the Central Bank.

==== General Labor Law ====
Perhaps the most important and long lasting reforms of this period was the Código del Trabajo (Labor Code) passed by decree of 24 May 1939. The Labor Code, which came to be dubbed the Código Busch (Busch Code), had been the realization of early drafts written by the labor leader Waldó Álvarez and finally brought forth long called for social and labor reform. The document provided for government guarantees of job security, accident compensation, paid leave, and collective bargaining.

==== Mining Currency Law ====
On 7 June 1939, Busch promulgated one of the most important decrees of his administration. The law ordered the delivery of 100% of all foreign exchange earned by tin exports to the Central Bank, which would return the amount of foreign currency required for their duly verified needs and a maximum of 5% for the payment of dividends to their shareholders. The rest would be given to them at the exchange of 141 bolivianos per pound sterling. Companies that had their operating capital abroad were required to transfer them to the Central Bank within 120 days with any active or passive resistance to the decree being considered an act of treason and judged and punished as such. While the measure was not meant to challenge private ownership of the mines, it for the first time provided the government with an effective way of acquiring some of the earnings of Bolivia's powerful tin industry and asserted the right of the State to intervene in the country's economy.

The decree was the most popular of Busch's administration, with public enthusiasm rivalling even Toro's nationalization of Standard Oil. On the other hand, it made Busch the public enemy of the Rosca, (Note: La Rosca (English: The Chain). In Bolivia, this is an expression designating the mining oligarchy, whose corporations, owned by the three "tin barons" (Simón Iturri Patiño, Moritz "Mauricio" Hochschild, and Carlos Víctor Aramayo), collectively controlled all the most important mines in the country, granting them a high degree of economic and political influence over state affairs.) Bolivia's powerful oligarchy of tin barons, who denounced the new law and enlisted the support of the conservative Concordance to oppose it. The reaction from the Rosca was swift. According to Foreign Minister Eduardo Díez de Medina, "The consortium of the large mine owners [...] who saw in the attitude of the president a threat to the predominance of privileged groups, unleashed a violent opposition to his measures. Busch received anonymous threats from all points of the country". This was recognized by Busch who upon issuing the decree declared: "I know that this step is extremely serious for my government and that many dangers lie in wait for me. But it does not matter, I am fighting for the Bolivian people and if I fall I will have fallen with a great flag: the economic freedom of Bolivia".

== Death and controversy ==
In the last weeks of Busch's life, pressure from the press against his government became more severe. The attacks against his leadership included claims "that he was [too] young and inexperienced to govern" and "that he had neither culture nor knowledge". Busch's political woes were compounded by personal issues including the death of his mother, whose funeral saw low attendance, and a dental ailment which forced him to take analgesics to calm the pain. Historian Pablo Michel also posits that Busch may have been suffering from undiagnosed PTSD which from 1936 to 1968 led to the suicides of over 400 Chaco War veterans.

On 18 August 1939, the dentist José Rosa Quiroga had removed his front tooth, affecting him aesthetically. Since then, Busch had not been in the Palacio Quemado, instead handling administrative acts from his small home in Miraflores which he shared with his brother-in-law Colonel Eliodoro Carmona and their respective wives, Matilde Carmona and Elisa Tornee, and their children. On the 21st, the family of Major Ricardo Goitia, married to Lía Carmona, Matilde and Eliodoro's sister, had arrived from Guaqui to celebrate Eliodoro's birthday the following day.

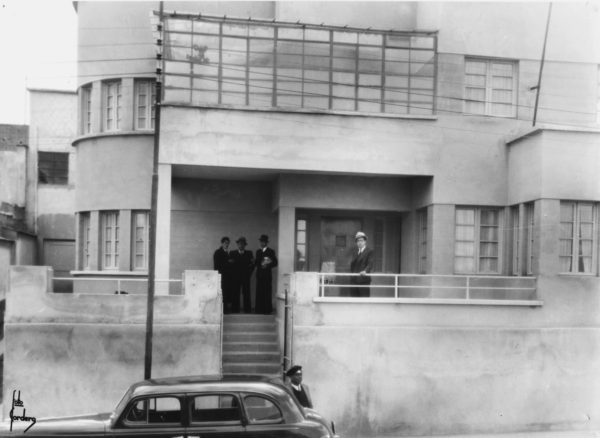
Busch's Miraflores residence.

=== Apparent suicide ===
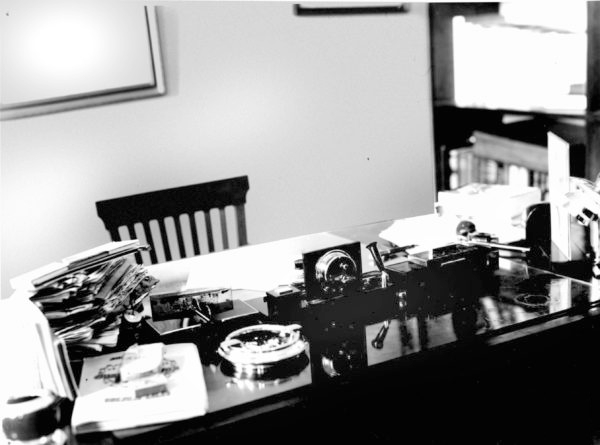
Germán Busch's office desk. (To the right) The revolver Busch used to shoot himself.

At 9:00 p.m. on 22 August, Busch and his wife returned to their home after a final visit to the dentist Rosa Quiroga and began Carmona's birthday celebration. While Busch appeared happy during the dinner, Matilde later reported that "it was a feigned joy". On 24 August, the morning edition of the newspaper El Diario published the statement of events as recounted by Major Goitia: "everything took place in an atmosphere of family cordiality until three in the morning, when the people in attendance had left. It was then that [Busch] recalled having left numerous documents on his desk that had to be dispatched and told Carmona and [Goitia] that he wanted to review and sign them. Then, Goitia made him notice that the hour was late and that it would be more convenient for him to go to rest. The president replied, 'Three million Bolivian citizens weigh on my shoulders, I must ensure their well-being and the progress of the country, but in this work misunderstanding, lack of cooperation and the underhanded action of my enemies hinder my work.' [...] At that moment, [...] Goitia noticed that Busch was suffering from one of his nervous breakdowns [...] and saw that he took a pistol from his pants pocket. Then, Goitia took him by the hand and in a fight to prevent him from using it against himself, in which Carmona also participated, the first shot came out of a window".

The first shot was fired at 5:20 a.m. Reportedly, Matilde was awoken by it but did not immediately go down because she was wearing nightwear. Instead, she asked the butler Francisco Medina, "What happened?" to which he replied, "The colonel fired," at which point she decided not to intervene and returned to her bedroom. Carmona reported that he and Goitia attempted to take the gun from Busch but that "it was impossible". Ten minutes later, at 5:30 a.m., Carmona recounts that "With a soft tone [Busch] told us to stop, we thought he had calmed down, but suddenly he pushed us, raised his arm and took the shot. His head fell on the right side on the desk and the gun fell to the ground. I held his head. I picked up the gun and put it on the desk". Carmona explained that this last detail was the reason his fingerprints appeared on the gun.

At that point, Carmona's wife and daughter, Elisa and Yolanda, accompanied by Goitia's wife Lya, left the house to seek the surgeon Guillermo Debbe who lived a block away. When Debbe arrived, Busch's body was laid out in the hall until the arrival of a second doctor, Félix Veintemillas, who upon seeing the body conveyed to the family that "There is no remedy". Nonetheless, Veintemillas was convinced by the physical threats of Carmona and the pleading of Matilde to take the body to the general hospital to be operated on. On the morning of 23 August, Busch underwent a difficult operation. After nine hours of agony, he died at 2:45 p.m.

=== Controversy ===
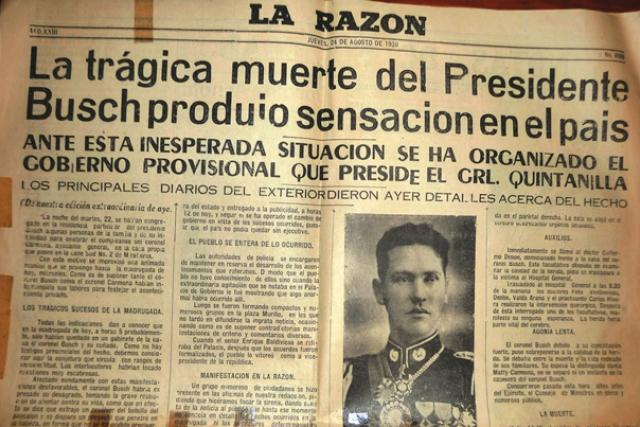
The newspaper La Razón reports on the death of Germán Busch, 24 August 1939. The morning papers La Calle, El País, and La Nación corroborated the narrative of suicide.

At the hospital, there were few attendants save for his own family and that of Vice President Baldivieso. Before Busch had even died, but seeing that he was unlikely to recover, General Carlos Quintanilla staged a military occupation of the Palacio Quemado, deeming the constitutional succession null and void due to Busch's assumption of dictatorial rule in April. Following the president's death, the more conservative and pro-oligarchic elements of the Bolivian elite were quick to reassert themselves. In a radio address to the nation, Quintanilla declared himself provisional president, charged with calling new elections and returning the political field to the traditional status quo pre-Toro.

In his work Busch is dead, who lives now? published the year after Busch's death, Luis Toro Ramallo reported that in those days conjectures about the death of the president circulated throughout the city and that "riots and revolutions were announced". On the other hand, they "murmured" and spoke aloud against the "coup leader" Quintanilla. At the time, the common assumption amongst Bolivians was that Busch had been assassinated at the behest of the Rosca.

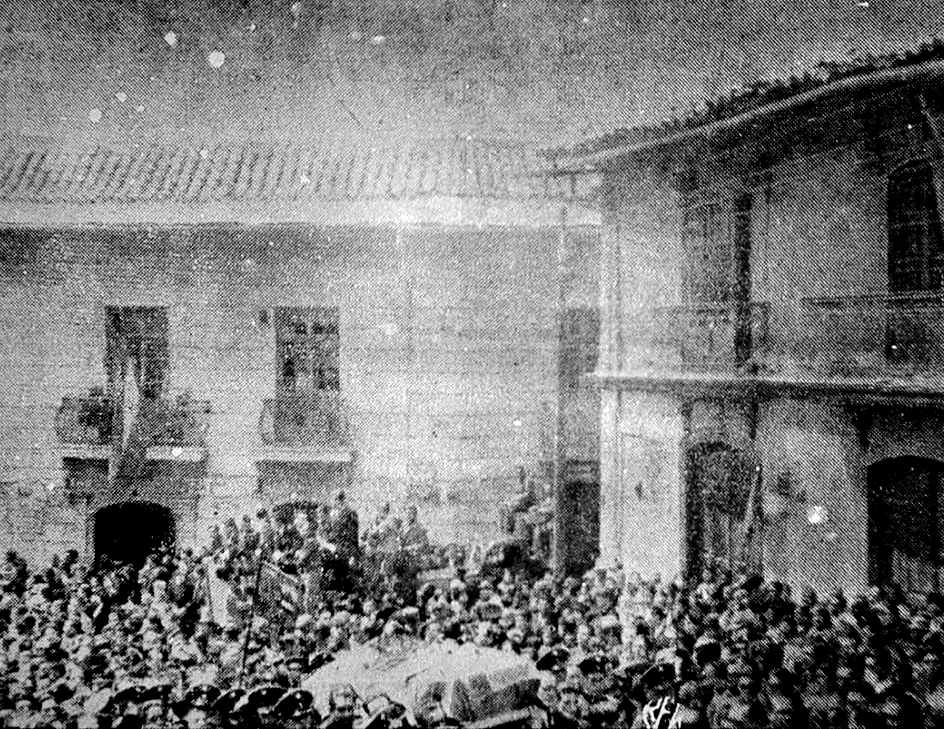
A mass gathering of attendants to the burial of Germán Busch.

In order to reinforce the version of Busch's suicide, the Quintanilla government issued a statement on 24 August which "leaves on record with full evidence that the death of the president is due to an absolutely voluntary act by determination made under the weight of his deep patriotic anguish". On 28 September, the autopsy report was delivered which concluded "possible suicide". "This cannot be affirmed categorically due to the fact that the traces left by a shot at a short distance [...] are not noticeable because the wound has been washed for healing". Later, the final order of the case, issued on 5 October 1939, concluded that "President Busch has ended his existence through the violent procedure of suicide [...] at his work desk in his private home, using a Colt 32 revolver". This ruling generated debate.

In 1944, Congressman Edmundo Roca and Captain Julio Ponce de León accused Colonel Eliodoro Carmona as having been the "main perpetrator of Busch's death" and requested "imprisonment while ordinary justice is pronounced again". Thus, the investigation was reopened. On 31 August 1944, La Calle reported that these accusations were made due to the "statements" made by Carmona in Charagua. According to Lieutenant Eufracio Bruno, who would later testify at the trial, he asked Carmona "Why do[es] public opinion point to you as the author of Busch's death?" and that in a drunken state, Carmona replied "Yes, I killed him, now what do you want?" Bruno also assured that on the birthday of officer Julio Garnica, Carmona confirmed "this arm killed Colonel Busch for eighteen thousand dollars". The judicial process was ultimately inconclusive and was cut short by the fall of the Villarroel government in 1946. Carmona nonetheless suffered two lynching attempts as a result.

==== Contemporary analysis ====
The family of Germán Busch's father, Pablo Busch, also support the theory that Busch's death was an assassination by his in-laws in the Carmona family. According to Lila Ávila Busch, Germán's niece, when her grandfather, Pablo Busch, received at his residence in Genoa the telegram informing him of the death of Busch, he threw it angrily stating that "This is the work of the Carmona". Herlan Vaca Díez, Busch's nephew, claims that his uncle Gustavo Busch, Germán's brother, spoke with the butler who attended the party during which Busch died. "He always said that Carmona had not only killed Germán, but had also killed another person before". Robert Brockmann pushed against these claims, saying, "did Pablo know, thousands of miles away, that the Carmona had murdered Germán? How did he know?" and that "The alluded role of the butler Medina is tenuous at best".

Augusto Céspedes, in his work The Hanged President, stated that "Busch's suicide was so opportune for the large miners that even today it makes us presume a strategic assassination". Nevertheless, contemporary historians such as Brockmann state that the narrative of suicide is the most maintainable. According to Brockmann, "The thorough on-site police investigation, which proves the suicide, is lightly dismissed. In Bolivia, where it is impossible to keep a secret, it would not be feasible to build and maintain such an elaborate lie for almost eight decades". Brockmann also points to the fact that between 1938 and 1939 Busch had attempted to commit suicide at least six times: "So when you add up the police records, the testimony of the witnesses you realize that there is a significant tendency for him to commit suicide".

== Legacy ==
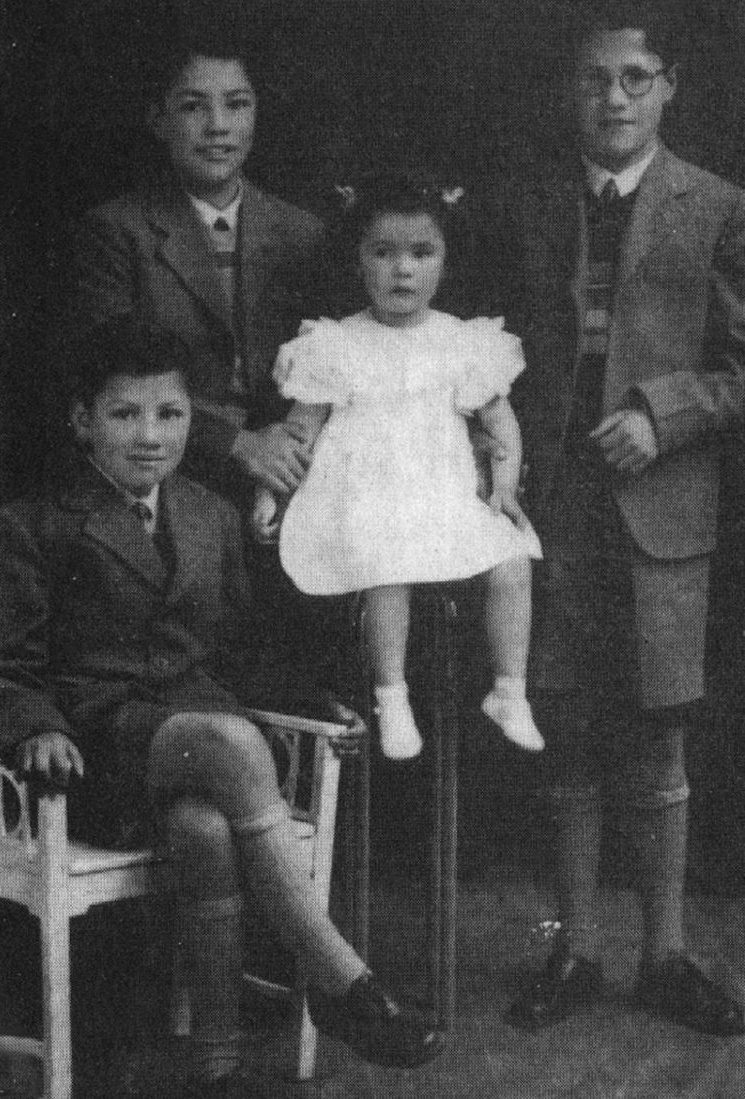
Busch's four children: Germán, Orlando, Waldo, and Gloria who was born the year after his death.

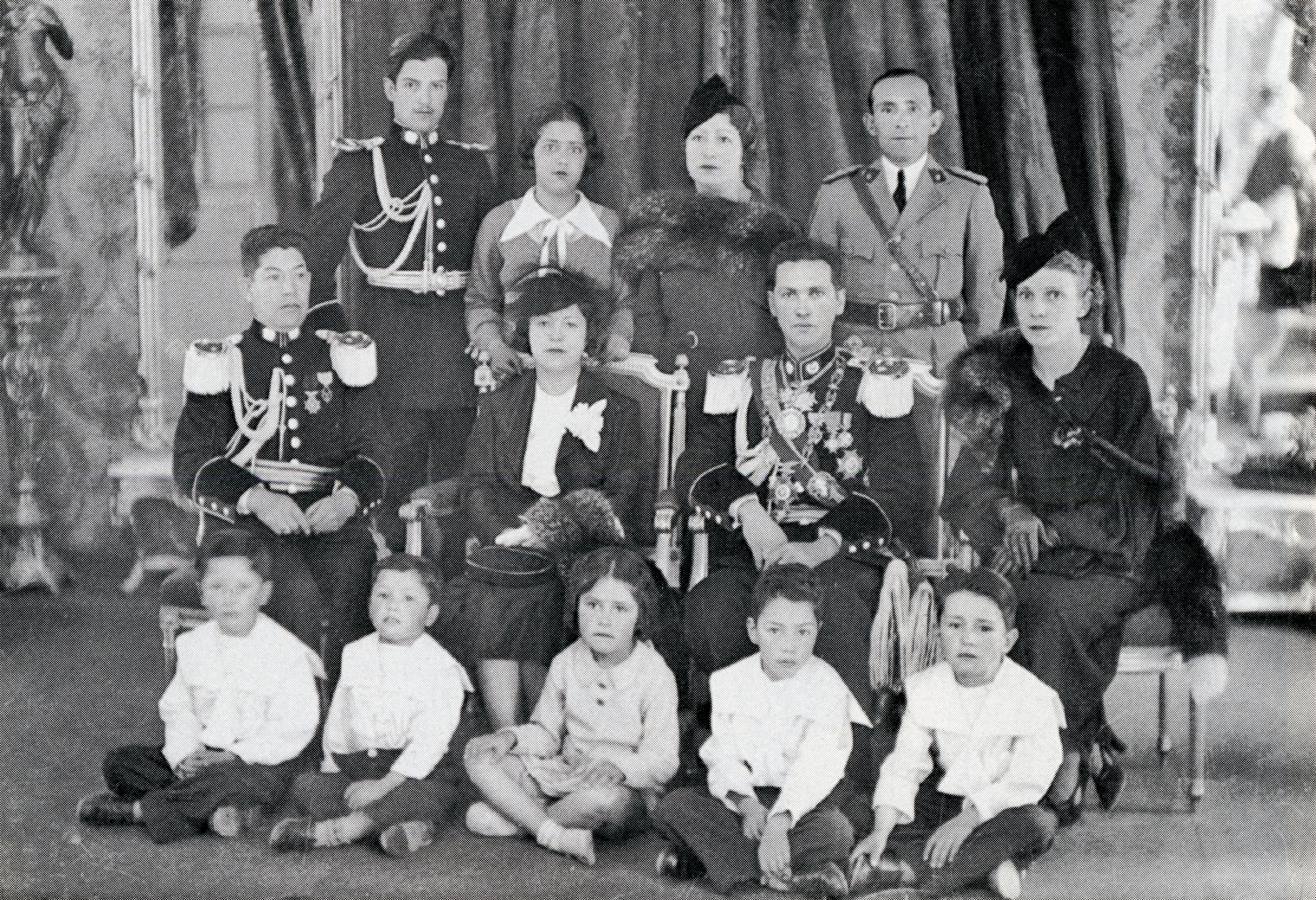
Busch with his extended in-law family.

Robert Brockmann describes Busch as "like the Greek demigods or heroes [...] Everything he touched took on enormous impulses, unsuspected ramifications, and caused great changes, whether Busch intended that or not". "Without doubt, he is part of the national mythology". While Herbert S. Klein describes his political leadership as "incapable of coherent, concentrated direction", he also states that Busch's administration allowed for more reformist ideas to gain a voice on the national stage for the very first time, marking "the end of national consensus and the beginning of uncompromising class conflict in Bolivia [..., which] would ultimately lead to the Bolivian National Revolution of April 1952".

Colonel Alberto Natusch, who ruled Bolivia for 16 days in November 1979, was Busch's nephew. Germán Busch had four children; three sons, Germán, Orlando, and Waldo, and one daughter, Gloria. She was born in 1940, the year after Busch's death.

=== Links to Fascism ===
Because historically the Bolivian army contained some German advisors and German-trained soldiers, Busch (of part-German ancestry himself) was suspected to have Nazi tendencies; this was reinforced by the fact that only a week after taking power in 1937, he had requested economic and oil advisors from the German legation. On 9 April 1939, shortly before his declaration of dictatorial rule on the 24th, Busch had spoken with Ernst Wendler, the German minister in Bolivia, to request "moral and material support" for the establishment of "order and authority in the state through [...] the transition to a totalitarian state form". To do this, Busch asked for German advisors in almost every field of government administration. While Wendler expressed interest, the final reply by the German government on 22 April cordially denied Busch's request, stating that it wished to avoid "conspicuous measures, such as the sending of a staff of advisors".

While Busch sympathized with elements of Nazi ideology, he never agreed with its fundamental principles regarding race and antisemitism, confirmed by his sponsorship of Jewish emigration from Europe and his condemnation of the racist and regionalist Eastern Socialist Party which he claimed constituted "an attack against national unity".

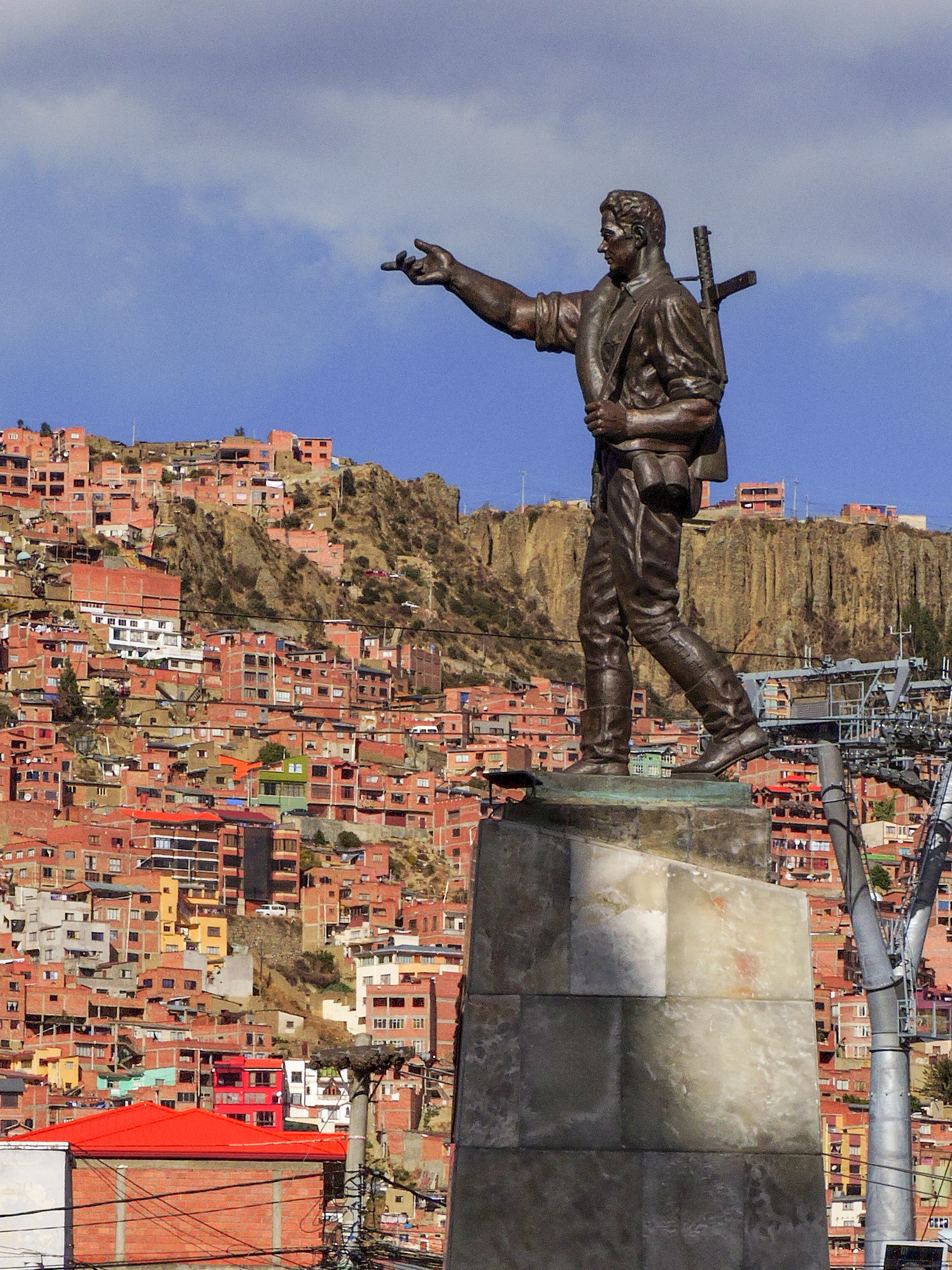
Monument to Germán Busch in La Paz, Bolivia.

At the same time, Busch has been described as, first and foremost, an illiberal, disillusioned with almost 40 years of corrupt liberal governments. Busch and the era of military socialism in Bolivia came at a time before the emergence of anti-fascism and the violent separation of National Socialism and Marxism as a result of World War II. In the Bolivia of the 1930s, the boundaries between the many ideas of socialism (from national socialism to left socialism to moderate socialism), while present, had not yet clearly distinguished themselves.

=== Places and monuments ===
Various locales in Bolivia were named after him including the Germán Busch Province of the department of Santa Cruz which was created by Law No. 672 of 30 November 1984 during the second government of Hernán Siles Zuazo. Located in the province of the same name, Puerto Busch is a river port that is on the international river Paraguay. Puerto Busch, for many decades, was a port project in oblivion, which regained its prominence as a strategic commercial and export zone after the defeat of Bolivia before Chile in the Maritime Demand at the International Court at The Hague. The port is an alternative to a sovereign outlet to the Atlantic Ocean for Bolivia.

A monument to Germán Busch is located in the Bolivian capital of La Paz and other statues exist in Pando, Beni, and Santa Cruz.

=== Currency and postage ===
Bolivian currency reform of 1 January 1963 adopted the peso boliviano which featured Busch on its 10 peso note. However, due to inflation which resulted in the effective devaluation of 95%, the peso was replaced by the Bolivian boliviano effective 1 January 1987. Busch does not appear on contemporary currency.

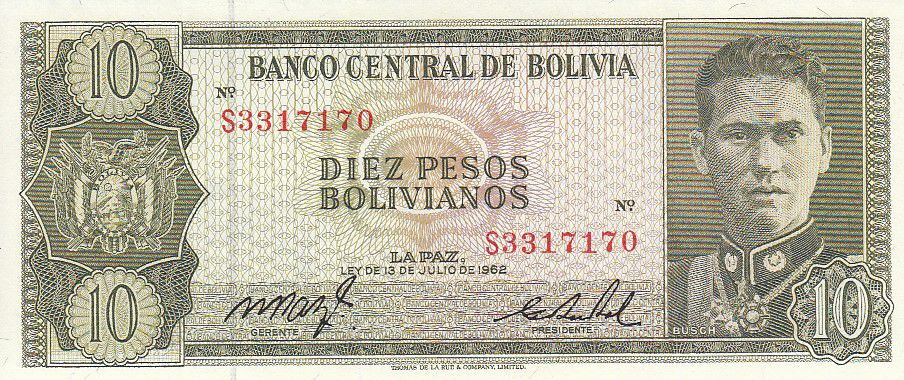
Busch on the 1963 ten peso bill

== See also ==
- Government Junta of Bolivia (1936–1938)
- Cabinet of Germán Busch

Party political offices
Preceded by Office established	Supreme Leader of the Legion of Veterans; 1937–1939	Vacant Title next held by Bernardino; Bilbao Rioja
Political offices
Preceded by José Luis; Tejada Sorzano	President of Bolivia; Interim; 1936	Succeeded by David Toro
Preceded by David Toro	President of Bolivia; 1937–1939	Succeeded by Carlos Quintanilla; Interim
