= Portachuelo =

Coordinates: 17.3572°S 63.3906°W

- Town
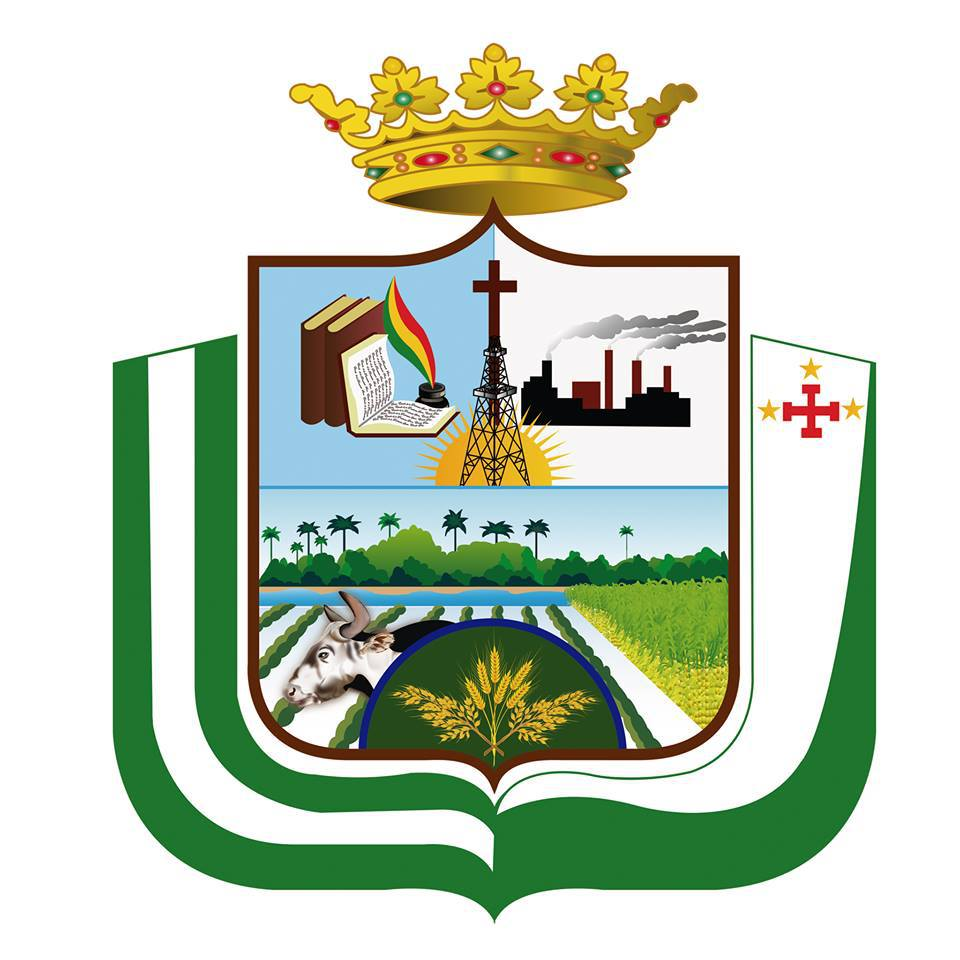
- Flag Seal
- Interactive map of Portachuelo
- Country: Bolivia

Area
  - Total: 413 sq mi (1,069 km^{2})

Population (2012)
  - Total: 14,091
  - Density: 34.14/sq mi (13.18/km^{2})
- Time zone: UTC-4 (BOT)

Portachuelo is a small town in Bolivia.

== Climate ==
Climate data for Portachuelo, elevation 289 m (948 ft), (1975–2009)
Month	Jan	Feb	Mar	Apr	May	Jun	Jul	Aug	Sep	Oct	Nov	Dec	Year
Mean daily maximum °C (°F)	31.1 (88.0)	30.3 (86.5)	30.3 (86.5)	29.4 (84.9)	26.6 (79.9)	25.6 (78.1)	25.6 (78.1)	28.1 (82.6)	28.9 (84.0)	30.5 (86.9)	30.2 (86.4)	30.2 (86.4)	28.9 (84.0)
Daily mean °C (°F)	24.7 (76.5)	23.9 (75.0)	24.1 (75.4)	23.0 (73.4)	20.4 (68.7)	19.4 (66.9)	19.4 (66.9)	21.1 (70.0)	22.4 (72.3)	23.7 (74.7)	23.9 (75.0)	24.1 (75.4)	22.5 (72.5)
Mean daily minimum °C (°F)	18.2 (64.8)	17.6 (63.7)	17.8 (64.0)	16.7 (62.1)	14.2 (57.6)	13.3 (55.9)	13.1 (55.6)	14.1 (57.4)	15.8 (60.4)	17.0 (62.6)	17.7 (63.9)	18.0 (64.4)	16.1 (61.0)
Average precipitation mm (inches)	222.3 (8.75)	235.2 (9.26)	167.1 (6.58)	103.3 (4.07)	84.0 (3.31)	61.8 (2.43)	40.7 (1.60)	55.3 (2.18)	71.5 (2.81)	130.8 (5.15)	173.9 (6.85)	244.5 (9.63)	1,590.4 (62.62)
Average precipitation days	9.6	9.1	8.4	5.4	4.7	4.0	2.7	3.2	4.2	5.8	6.5	9.8	73.4
Average relative humidity (%)	65.4	65.0	65.4	65.2	65.1	65.9	64.9	64.3	62.8	63.8	64.3	65.2	64.8
Source: Servicio Nacional de Meteorología e Hidrología de Bolivia
