= April 1935 Bolivian offensive =

- Part of the Chaco War
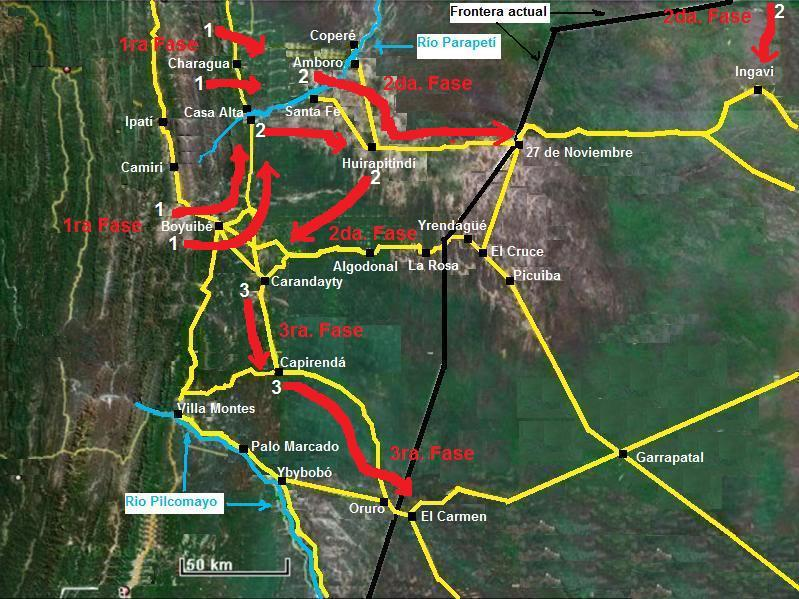
- Map of the planned offensive
Date	16 April - 15 May 1935
Location	Gran Chaco
Result	Indecisive

Belligerents
Bolivia	Paraguay

Commanders and leaders
Enrique Peñaranda; David Toro	José Félix Estigarribia; Rafael Franco

Strength
45,000	15,000

Casualties and losses
"45% casualties"	

The April 1935 Bolivian offensive was an operation amidst the Chaco War between Bolivia and Paraguay. After Paraguayan advances in their Charagua offensive threatened the key cities of Camiri and Santa Cruz de la Sierra, Bolivian command decided to launch a major offensive in order to push back the Paraguayan Army to the Chaco. Though the Bolivian forces outnumbered their opponents heavily, and had much greater local knowledge of the terrain, their gains were very limited versus what was planned.

== Background ==
After the heavy defeats suffered by the Bolivian Army in late 1934 (especially El Carmen and Yrendagüé) a general mobilization was decreed by president Tejada Sorzano. By late March 1935, it had almost been completed, with the Bolivian Army now having 45,000 men in 35 regiments, 4 units of sappers, 3 heavy machine gun battalions, 17 artillery batteries, plus some divisionary cavalry squadrons, nearly triple the strength of the Paraguayan Army in the field.

At that point, Bolivian command decided on a general offensive in order to dislodge the Paraguayans from their advance positions, which threatened the key cities of Camiri and Santa Cruz de la Sierra, as they extended from the Serranía del Aguaragüe to a series of strongpoints around Ybibobó, Capirenda and Carandaitý.

The plan had three phases: in the first, the Bolivian Army would break through the central sector (around Boyuibe) to separate the Paraguayan Army into two halves, and then attack each one separately. Meanwhile, the forces defending Villamontes would try to attack the Paraguayans facing them, in order to pin them in place. In the second phase, an advance towards the north would be made in order to take back the Parapetí River's shores, Fort 27 de Noviembre and Carandaitý, all strategic positions, and destroy their defenders. From Roboré and Ravelo, a push would be made towards Fort Ingavi near the Paraguay River (which would culminate in the Battle of Ingavi in June), and the Villamontes front would remain static, with only pinning attacks taking place. In the third phase, their forces would advance from Carandaitý to the south, capturing Capirenda and Ybibobó in a movement aimed ultimately towards El Carmen (where the Battle of El Carmen had taken place months earlier), making it impossible for the Paraguayan forces to threaten the Bolivian oilfields.

The Paraguayan advance against Charagua in early April, which threatened Santa Cruz de la Sierra and Camiri, forced the Bolivian command's hand, and the offensive was launched before all forces were fully in their assigned places.

The Bolivian plan was ambitious, and it counted with the Paraguayan Army's distance from its supply bases, inferiority both in numbers and equipment, and lack of familiarity with the hilly terrain they were now fighting in. Still, in terms of morale, they were better off than the Bolivians, who had, at that point, been mostly on the defensive for years, and defeated repeatedly.

== Engagement ==
On April 16, two full-strength Bolivian divisions, together with artillery support, broke through the at least 5 times weaker Paraguayan 3rd Infantry Division defending Boyuibe. This Paraguayan unit had arrived on the theater only in March, and both of its regiments, the 26th Infantry Regiment Cerro León and the 8th Cavalry Regiment Gral. Pedro Duarte, were green. The Paraguayan General Reserve Division tried to counter this move and hold the Bolivian advance at Mandeyapecuá, 30 km to the east of Boyuibe, but, facing encirclement, it had to retreat to Carandaitý. The 15,000 Bolivian soldiers in the region lacked shoes, clothing and communications equipment, slowing their movement.

Paraguayan command immediately reacted. The 8th Infantry Division withdrew from recently captured Charagua to the Boyuibe zone, with 2200 men under Colonel Eugenio Garay being left around Charagua, Coperé and Casa Alta to hold back the 4500-men strong Bolivian II Corps (the 2nd Infantry Divison and the 3rd Cavalry Division) under Colonel Anze. In the second phase, the II Corps was meant to push back the Paraguayan forces in this region to the Parapetí River. Charagua would be abandoned by its few defenders on 21 April, after five days of occupation, as a day earlier the II Corps had begun to move to encircle it.

The surprise advance of the 8th Division and supporting units around Cambeití, on the flank of the axis of the Bolivian advance, made that thrust lose some momentum. The Bolivian division in this zone, the 7th Infantry, much more numerous than the Paraguayan 8th, advanced along both flanks of its opponent and encircled it. For four days, a lot of attention was thrown into this scene by Bolivian command, media and government, but, as had happened frequently in the past, the veteran Paraguayan unit managed to break out as the Bolivians moved to narrow the encirclement, with 475 men falling prisoner. They then withdrew to the Parapetí River, unharassed due to their opponents' exhaustion.

Bolivian command was dumbfounded by this setback. Colonel Toro, chief of staff of the Bolivian Army, sent a message to the commander of the 7th Division, Colonel Demetrio Ramos, claiming it was "incredible" that after a three-day siege their enemy managed to break out, despite further reinforcements being sent to the zone by the Bolivian headquarters. Lieutenant Colonel Aquiles Vergara, a Chilean in Bolivian service, wrote the following regarding the clash: "Naturally, the future of Bolivian operations [...] depended on inflicting upon the Paraguayan Army a decisive blow which would have traumatically paralised it [...]. Bolivian military thinkers and all of the country's worries focused on the siege at Cambeiti, whose status remained as an unknown for four days. The disillusion must have been great when Bolivian Supreme Command [...], in a communiqué issued on 28 April, ended all hopes, truly very realistic, which had been drawn up towards the, at least until recently, very solid encirclement in the north-central sector." (Note: This is a translation from the original Spanish, which reads: "Naturalmente que el futuro de las operaciones bolivianas [...] y el ritmo a imprimir al avance, dependía de infligirle al ejército paraguayo un golpe recio que lo hubiera paralizado traumaticamente [...]. Y el pensamiento militar boliviano y las ansias del país todo, se afincaron en el cerco de Cambeiti, en el cual, durante cuatro días, se mantuvo en suspenso una febril incógnita. Grande debió ser el desencanto cuando el Comando Superior boliviano [...] en un comunicado de fecha 28 de abril concluía con las esperanzas, muy factibles por cierto, que se habían forjado en torno al, hasta hacia poco, bien anillado cerco del sector central norte.")

The days Bolivian command wasted without reaching their established goals, or their hypotethical encirclements, or even finishing off the only concrete encirclement of a Paraguayan unit, allowed their opponents to mass up their reserves and redraw their defensive lines to more favorable positions, such as at Villamontes, where Tarairí was taken on 19 April at the cost of heavy casualties, but the Paraguayan I Corps was allowed to retreat in good order and reform their lines.

Having reached the Parapeti, the Bolivians prepared to assault across it, in order to maintain their momentum. On 4 May, the 3rd Cavalry Division attacked near Casa Alta, wading a ford with their rifles raised high, managing to cross the river before getting pinned on the sand on the other shore by machine gun fire; this beachhead held, however. The next day, the Paraguayan 5th Cavalry Regiment Aca Vera was mobilized to deal with the threat, but the Bolivians were too numerous for them.

On May 16, the same day Santa Fe fell to the Bolivian 7th Division, an attack by the Paraguayan 6th Division brought about the end of the second phase of the Bolivian offensive, after a month of permanent and exhausting combat. As had been seen in the Picuiba offensive a year earlier, slow Bolivian advances rarely caught their opponents unaware, and when they did, the Paraguayans would break out. Rumors that the war was to end at any moment and excessive caution in the Bolivian command kept any further objectives from being reached.

== Aftermath ==
The Bolivian failure in reaching most of their goals, despite an overwhelming superiority in men and equipment, influenced peace talks heavily. The Bolivian troops, command, and public opinion now believed no offensive victory could be won against the Paraguayan forces. In Paraguay, the lack of manpower and essential supplies such as gasoline and ammunition kept them from pushing further.
