= Second Battle of Alihuatá =

- Part of the Chaco War
Date	23 October–11 December 1933
Location	Gran Chaco
Result	Paraguayan victory

Belligerents
Bolivia	Paraguay

Commanders and leaders
Hans Kundt; Carlos Banzer; Enrique Peñaranda	José Félix Estigarribia; Juan Bautista Ayala; Rafael Franco

Strength
13,500 men	27,000 men

Casualties and losses
5,000 casualties	2,500 casualties

The Second Battle of Alihuatá was an engagement between Bolivian and Paraguayan forces during the Chaco War, taking place between late October and early December 1933. In this battle, Paraguayan forces recaptured Fort Alihuatá, lost to Bolivia in the First Battle of Alihuatá, and encircled and captured some of its defenders. It would be followed by the significant Paraguayan victory at Campo Vía, where some of the Bolivian troops defeated in Alihuatá were also encircled and destroyed.

== Background ==
On October 3, 1933, Paraguayan president Eusebio Ayala visited the Army's headquarters at Isla Po'í to grant overall field commander José Felix Estigarribia his promotion to brigadier general after the victory at Campo Grande, and they took this opportunity to discuss the strategy for the coming months. Estigarribia's intelligence asserted that Bolivian forces were drained and disorganized after their failed attacks at Nanawa and Gondra, and that their numerical and material superiority had waned over the past months. This would allow for them to pass onto the offensive, something Ayala agreed with.

On the Bolivian side, Hans Kundt was aware of his officers' claims that the army would not be able to hold its current positions after the aforementioned defeats, and there were suggestions for them to pull back to a shorter defensive line in order to replenish the drained divisions. Kundt would hold that Bolivia's manpower was limited, however, and that the army already in theater would need to be better supplied; he also removed from command some officers opposed to his doctrines, such as David Toro.

== Paraguayan plans ==
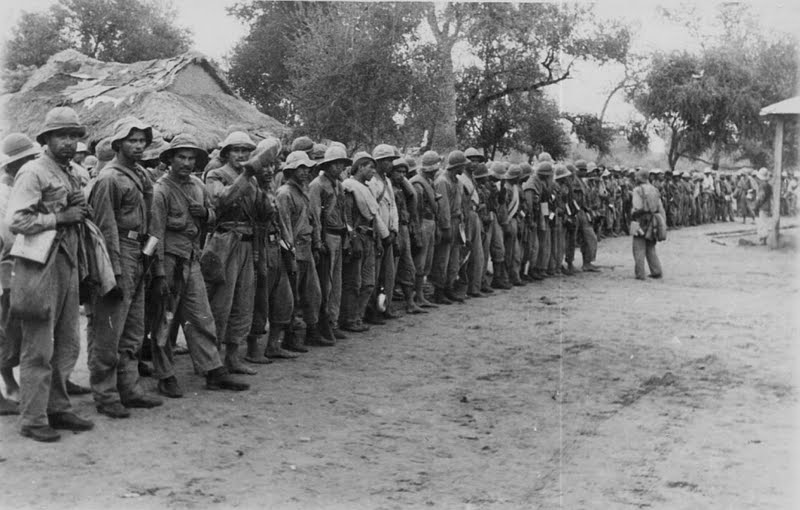
Paraguayan troops at Fort Alihuatá in 1932.

Throughout the war, Paraguayan offensives usually aimed to destroy enemy forces, while Bolivian offensives aimed to capture territory. This operation would be no different. Moving through two axes, Alihuatá and Nanawa, it would mobilize almost the entire 27,000-strong force Paraguay had in the theater of operations in order to destroy the enemy piecemeal. Estigarribia moved his command post to Fort Falcón, circa 20 km away from the front, where he started to form a Reserve Division with new troops from Asunción and some drawn from other fortifications in the Chaco; with this division, the offensive force was organized into 4 divisions (6th, 7th, 8th and Res.), supported by two artillery groups (1st and 3rd), facing solely the Bolivian 9th Division and its supporting units at Fort Alihuatá (known to the Paraguayans as Fort Zenteno), lost to Bolivia some months earlier in the First Battle of Alihuatá (originally, a Bolivian fort, captured by Paraguay in the early stages of the war).

== Denouement ==
On 23 October, merely 20 days after Ayala and Estigarribia met, Paraguayan forces began to push most of the front and to probe the 9th Division, aiming to push it into its definite defensive line.

After these initial engagements, the 9th Division's left wing began to be maneuvered around. Simultaneously, feints were initiated all over the front, in order to pin the Bolivian forces in their places and to confuse their command as regards to the true intentions the Paraguayan forces harboured. On November 12, a strong feint was launched on the Nanawa front, and 428 Bolivian troops (of the Castrillo regiment) were captured.

Still, Kundt drew forces from the 4th Division located near Gondra and the 7th near Nanawa in order to counter the Paraguayan flanking maneuver around the 9th. This was not enough to forestall the Paraguayan advance, however, despite it being delayed by supply difficulties (mainly involving water). Bolivian command proved reluctant to withdraw the 9th from its position at Fort Alihuatá, nevertheless, and underestimated the Paraguayan offensive's size.

Colonel Banzer, aware of his deteriorating position, constantly demanded reinforcements. On November 28, Kundt promised him to attack the Paraguayan spearhead from Puesto Moreno, to its rear, at the same time as Estigarribia ordered the Paraguayan I Corps to finish encircling Alihuatá.

=== Fall of Alihuatá ===
On 3 December, Estigarribia assumed tactical direction over the I Corps, after some delays by its command. The next day, a force made up by the Paraguayan 7th Division and supporting regiments (circa 3300 men) broke through the rear of the 9th Division, foiling all Bolivian attempts to stop it. This made it so that the 9th Division's 7000 men were nearly encircled, with one road left towards Pozos Encanto and Esperanza. Kundt gave Banzer freedom to act freely according to the circumstances.

On 7 December, the Bolivian 4th Division's frontline collapsed under a surprise night attack by the Paraguayan 1st Division under Lieutenant Colonel Rafael Franco. This created a gap in the wider frontline through which the Paraguayans broke through, to the surprise of both Bolivian and Paraguayan commands, as Franco had acted independently. Banzer accused Kundt of not updating him regarding this development, and that his promised reinforcements were but fresh recruits with incomplete training. He ordered Fort Alihuatá to be burned down and a difficult retreat towards Campo Vía ensued, both for the 9th Division and the 4th, circa 5000 men strong. Campo Vía was an inhospitable zone in the Chaco, and it was soon besieged by Paraguayan forces. This led to a lack of water soon ensuing amongst the Bolivian divisions. Some of their men managed to escape while the siege was incomplete, but most of them would surrender or be killed at the Battle at Campo Vía which took place soon after.

== Order of battle of the Paraguayan Army ==
Most of the Paraguayan Army, organized into 7 divisions, participated on the offensive.

=== Headquarters ===
Commander – Brigadier General José Felix Estigarribia

- Operation commander - Colonel Juan Bautista Ayala

=== 1st Division ===
Commander – Lieutenant Colonel Rafael Franco

- Infantry Regiment no. 2 Ytororó – Major Julio B. Jara
- Infantry Regiment no. 4 Curupayty – Major Ramón A. Paredes
- Infantry Regiment no. 19 Gral. Escobar - Major Alcibiades Irrazábal

=== 2nd Division ===
Commander – Lieutenant Colonel Paulino Antola

- Infantry Regiment no. 1 2 de Mayo – Captain Rufino Pampliega
- Infantry Regiment no. 3 Corrales – Major Timoteo Aguirre

=== 4th Division ===
Commander – Carlos J. Fernández

- Infantry Regiment no. 6 Boquerón – Major Luis Santiviago
- Infantry Regiment no. 20 Acayuazá – Major Isaías Báez Allende
- Cavalry Regiment no. 2 Cnel. Toledo – Major Juan N. Barrios
- Cavalry Regiment no. 3 Cnel. Mongelós - Major Juan Cáceres

=== 6th Division ===
Commander – Lieutenant Colonel Federico Wenman Smith

- Infantry Regiment no. 5 Gral. Díaz – Captain Antonio González
- Infantry Regiment no. 8 Piribebuy – Captain Guido Chase Sardi

=== 7th Division ===
Commander – Lieutenant Colonel José Antonio Ortiz

- Infantry Regiment no. 9 Itá Ybaté – Major José M. Cazal
- Infantry Regiment no. 14 Cerro Corá – Captain Atílio Benítez

=== 8th Division ===
Commander – Lieutenant Colonel Félix Cabrera

- Infantry Regiment no. 16 Mcal. López – Major Arsenio Fretes/Captain Lorenzo Medina
- Cavalry Regiment no. 9 Capitán Bado – Major Nicolás Korsacof
- Sappers Group no. 2 Gral. Genes - Captain Basiliano Caballero Irala

=== Gen. Res. Division ===
Commander – Lieutenant Colonel Eduardo Torreani Viera

- Infantry Regiment no. 17 Yatayty Corá – Major Restituto Bogado
- Infantry Regiment no. 18 Pitiantuta – Major Abdón Palacios
- Cavalry Regiment no. 1 Valois Rivarola – Major Alfredo Ramos
- Artillery Group Gral. Bruguez - Captain Andrés Aguilera

=== Supporting units ===
These units were organized under various separate detachments during the battle.

- Infantry Regiment no. 10 Sauce - Captain César López Vivero
- Infantry Regiment no. 12 Rubio Sú – Captain Leonidas Lesch
- Infantry Regiment no. 15 Lomas Valentinas – Major Enrique Oliver
- Cavalry Regiment no. 7 Gral. San Martín – Captain Emilio Pastore/José del R. Lezcano
- 49th Battalion - Major Nicolás Chirkow
- Artillery Group no. 1 - Captain Andrés Aguilera
- Artillery Group no. 3 - Major Pablo Sanabria
