= Battle of Cañada Tarija =

- Part of the Chaco War
Date	23–28 March 1934
Location	Gran Chaco
Result	Paraguayan victory

Belligerents
Bolivia	Paraguay

Commanders and leaders
Enrique Peñaranda; Francisco Peña; Ángel Bavía	José Félix Estigarribia; Rafael Franco; Federico Wenman Smith

Units involved
9th Division	6th Division

Strength
1500 men	3000 men

Casualties and losses
1200 casualties	26 casualties

The Battle of Cañada (Note: Cañada comes from "cañadón", a type of river valley typical of the Chaco.) Tarija was an engagement in the Chaco War between Bolivia and Paraguay, fought in March 1934. A Paraguayan division attacked part of a Bolivian division, and managed to encircle and destroy one of its regiments after capturing its munitions depot.

== Background ==
In December 1933, at the Campo Vía pocket, the Bolivian 9th and 4th divisions were destroyed. In early February 1934, in Carandaytý, a new 9th Division began to be formed under Colonel Francisco Peña, who had fought in Boquerón. Their goal was to hold Fort Picuiba, a small fortification deep in the Chaco. José Felix Estigarribia, overall commander of Paraguayan forces in theater, decided to attack the 9th Division, specifically, two of its regiments, the 16th and 18th, which were on the move to a position called Cañada Tarija, in order to destroy them and thus harm the position of surrounding Bolivian units. These regiments were 1500 men out of the division's 5000; Cañada Tarija was more than 100 km away from Fort Picuiba, meaning the rest of the division would not be able aid its defenders in a timely manner.

== Engagement ==
On March 23, the Paraguayan 6th Division under Federico Wenman Smith, part of the II Corps under the aggressive General Rafael Franco, intercepted the Bolivian 18th Infantry Regiment's vanguard at Cañada Tarija. The 18th was isolated from the rest of its division, with only another regiment, the 16th, nearby. Peña, the divisional commander, had his headquarters 300 km away from them.

Smith ordered two of his regiments, the 8th and 5th Infantry Regiments, to advance to the right, a maneuver which ended up surrounding the two battalions in the Bolivian reserve, and capturing the enemy regimental munitions depot. On March 28, unable to break through the encirclement, and having run out of ammnuition, it would surrender to Paraguayan forces, losing circa 1200 men between dead, wounded, captured and missing, and all its weaponry. Its commander attempted suicide, but survived, was taken to the Paraguayan camp, and died on April 5 of his wounds.

Garrapatal, the Bolivian backup position, was also occupied later on March 28, and Paraguayan forces established a defensive line ahead of it.

== Aftermath ==
The Bolivian defeat at Cañada Tarija was a severe blow to the country's public opinion. After some months of diminished action after the decisive defeat at Campo Vía and a ceasefire, it was taken as a demonstration that whatever issues plagued the Bolivian Army still had not been fixed.

The Paraguayan Army took the new Bolivian codebooks and important maps where all their supply routes in the Central Chaco were laid out. This way, they found out about a 250 km long route connecting Campo Jurado with Villamontes, a road which was immediately reconnoitered by the Paraguayan I Corps. They also learned that there were no water sources between Garrapatal and Carandayty; in the future, this information would be exploited in order to make a surprise attack. Peña was dismissed from command.

== Order of battle of the Paraguayan Army ==
The Paraguayan 6th Division, part of the 2nd Corps, was the only Paraguayan unit involved in this battle.

=== Headquarters ===
Commander – Major General José Felix Estigarribia

- Commander, 2nd Corps - Colonel Rafael Franco

=== 6th Division ===
Commander – Lieutenant Colonel Federico Wenman Smith

- Chief of Staff - Major Feliciano Morales
- Infantry Regiment no. 5 Gral. Díaz – Captain Sinforiano Brusquetti
- Infantry Regiment no. 8 Piribebuy – Captain Guido Chase Sardi
- Infantry Regiment no. 14 Cerro Corá – Major Fidel Ferreira
- Artillery Group no. 3 – Captain Federico Jara Troche

== Sources ==
- Díaz, Julio (1943). Fastos militares de Bolivia (in Spanish). Escuela Tipografica Salesiana.
- Estigarribia, José (1969). The epic of the Chaco: Marshal Estigarribia's memoirs of the Chaco War, 1932-1935. University of Texas Press.
- Gaona, Silvio (1964). Capellanes de la Guerra del Chaco (in Spanish). Vol. 1.
- Jaques, Tony (2006). Dictionary of Battles and Sieges. Bloomsbury.
- Querejazu, Roberto (1975). Masamaclay: historia política, diplomática y militar de la Guerra del Chaco (in Spanish). Editorial Los Amigos del Libro.
- Zook, David (1960). The conduct of the Chaco War. Bookman Associates.
