= Charagua offensive =

- Part of the Chaco War
Date	5-16 April 1935
Location	Gran Chaco
Result	Paraguayan victory

Belligerents
Bolivia	Paraguay

Commanders and leaders
Enrique Peñaranda; José Anze	José Félix Estigarribia; Rafael Franco; Eugenio Garay

Strength
5000 men	2600 men

Casualties and losses
Unknown	Unknown

The Charagua offensive was a Paraguayan operation in the late stages of the Chaco War between Bolivia and Paraguay. As fierce fighting at Villamontes had produced no results, Paraguayan command decided to strike elsewhere in the front, in the north towards Charagua, in the way to Santa Cruz, where separatist sentiment against Bolivia was rife. The Paraguayans managed to capture Charagua, but failed to destroy the enemy defenders, and were kept from pushing further due to the lack of trucks.

== Background ==
In January 1935, Paraguayan officers Major Caballero Irala, a detachment leader, and Colonel Rafael Franco, commander over the II Corps, proposed to General Estigarribia, overall commander of Paraguayan forces in the Chaco, an offensive crossing over the Parapetí River aimed towards Charagua, in the Serranía del Aguaragüe, with the goal of cutting the road between Boyuibe, in the very north of the front. This move was only approved by Estigarribia in March 1935, after some defeats against the Bolivian defensive line, crucially in Villamontes. In March, however, the situation had deteriorated in relation to January: an ambitious road-building program by the Bolivians had improved their supply lines, undoing some of the geographic isolation amongst their defensive positions; in addition, the Bolivian general mobilization program had made the new Bolivian Army (after its defeats at El Carmen and Yrendagüé) the largest fighting force to ever take the field in the Chaco War, 36 regiments strong, double those fielded in March 1934 by the Bolivians, and three times as numerous as the Paraguayan Army of the time.

For this operation against Charagua, Colonel Franco formed a detachment with the 2nd Infantry Division, taken from Villamontes, put under now Lieutenant Colonel Irala's command, together with the old Parapetí detachment, two regiments strong, under Major Antonio González. Together, these two units had 2,600 men, and the detachment was put under veteran commander Colonel Eugenio Garay. Facing them were the Bolivian II Corps under Colonel José Anze, which was composed of the 2nd Infantry Division (3 regiments, a cavalry section, a transport company, supply company and 10 guns) and the 3rd Cavalry Division (5 regiments, a detached cavalry battalion and a divisionary squadron), 5,000 men strong overall, plus civilian support.

== Engagement ==
The operation began with an airstrike on Charagua which destroyed the Bolivian information lines, and, soon afterwards, on 5 April 1935, after weeks of exhaustive reconnaissance work and information gathering, the Paraguayan 2nd Infantry Division crossed the Parapetí at a weak point, first with some men swimming to secure a beachhead, and then the whole division. The Bolivian 3rd Cavalry Regiment, in charge of defending the sector, was caught by surprise but managed to withdraw. This precipitated a movement where the entire 3rd Cavalry Division had to give up its positions, as its regiments had either lost coverage in their flanks, or had their communications severed.

On 15 April, the 8th Infantry Division, recently sent to reinforce the Paraguayan offensive marched towards Charagua, and, on the next day, destroyed the Bolivian 47th Infantry Regiment Parapetí, and took it; by that point, Charagua had already been evacuated by the Bolivians, who hoped to lure the Paraguayans further afield where they could be destroyed in detail. This was, however, a vain hope, as the Paraguayans lacked the trucks and other means to advance any further.

Paraguayan media gave great importance to this offensive, which prompted Bolivian command to start their counteroffensive ahead of schedule, as it put the Paraguayans within striking distance of Santa Cruz and its separatists. Though the Charagua offensive managed to achieve its goals in terms of territory, it failed to destroy Colonel Anze's corps, which, though battered, remained operational. This was mostly due to the local superiority in men and materiel that the Bolivians had in the theatre; the lack of men on the Paraguayan side allowed for Bolivian units to slip out of encirclements multiple times.
