= Battle of Ñancorainza =

- Part of the Chaco War
Date	7-11 February 1935
Location	Ñancorainza, Bolivia
Result	Bolivian victory

Belligerents
Bolivia	Paraguay

Commanders and leaders
Enrique Peñaranda; Carlos Quintanilla	José Félix Estigarribia; Rafael Franco

Casualties and losses
20 dead 50 wounded 12 missing	200 casualties

The Battle of Ñancorainza was fought amidst the Chaco War between Bolivia and Paraguay, in February 1935. It was the first engagement to take place outside of the Chaco. Though Paraguayan forces managed to encircle the Bolivian position, they were overwhelmed by heavy Bolivian reinforcements, suffered severe losses and were forced to withdraw.

== Background and engagement ==
After the significant Paraguayan victory at Yrendagüé in December 1934, which would allow for the start of the Paraguayan advance over the Andes, Colonel Rafael Franco, commander over the Paraguayan II Corps, formed a detachment under Major Basiliano Irala, a combat engineer, made up by the 14th Infantry Regiment Cerro Corá and the 2nd Sappers Regiment General Genes, approximately 1100 men strong, with the task of pursuing the retreating Bolivian forces. Given that the detachment lacked artillery (and reserves or even logistical support), they were hoping to exploit the disorganization in the Bolivian forces hailing from the scale of their recent defeat. After weeks of maneuvering around Santa Fe, a fortified position near Carandaitý, and the failure of Bolivian reinforcements to reach said fort, its destruction and abandonment was ordered by Bolivian command on January 17, and it was occupied by Paraguayan forces later on the same day. This meant the Parapetí River, which delimited Paraguay's claims to the Chaco to the northwest, had been reached. On 23 January, Paraguayan forces reached and took Carandaitý, as its supporting positions had fallen.

Ñancorainza is a location at the foothills of the Andes, and it was the objective set for the II Corps after Carandaitý, as Bolivian forces also withdrew from nearby Boyuibe and stopped at the Serranía del Aguaragüe (where Ñancorainza is located). On 7 February, three Paraguayan regiments (the San Martín, Lomas Valentinas and Zapadores 4) started an attack on that position, encircling the Bolivian 12th Infantry Regiment Manchego by advancing through an unguarded small road. Heavy Bolivian reinforcements were sent (namely, the 1st Cavalry Division) and a breakout was accomplished on 11 February. Effective Bolivian artillery fire, together with being caught in a crossfire between the Bolivian reinforcements and the defenders of Ñancorainza, caused heavy losses amongst the Paraguayans and eventually forced them to withdraw.

== Aftermath ==
This unfavourable result made it clear for Paraguayan command that operations in the mountains should be fundamentally different from those in the Chaco; the Paraguayan forces had taken positions only in a valley, and not secured the surrounding heights.
