= San Antonio del Parapetí =

- Town
- Location within Bolivia
- Coordinates: 20°00′S 63°10′W
- Country: Bolivia
- Department: Santa Cruz Department
- Province: Cordillera Province (Bolivia)
- Municipality: Charagua Municipality

Population (2012)
  - Total: 837
- Time zone: UTC-4 (BOT)

San Antonio del Parapetí is a town in the Santa Cruz Department of Bolivia.

== Climate ==
Climate data for San Antonio del Parapetí, elevation 600 m (2,000 ft), (1975–2011)
Month	Jan	Feb	Mar	Apr	May	Jun	Jul	Aug	Sep	Oct	Nov	Dec	Year
Mean daily maximum °C (°F)	33.2 (91.8)	32.5 (90.5)	32.0 (89.6)	29.1 (84.4)	26.2 (79.2)	25.2 (77.4)	26.4 (79.5)	29.4 (84.9)	31.3 (88.3)	33.9 (93.0)	34.1 (93.4)	33.8 (92.8)	30.6 (87.1)
Daily mean °C (°F)	27.2 (81.0)	26.6 (79.9)	26.1 (79.0)	23.5 (74.3)	20.6 (69.1)	19.2 (66.6)	19.0 (66.2)	21.4 (70.5)	23.4 (74.1)	26.4 (79.5)	27.1 (80.8)	27.5 (81.5)	24.0 (75.2)
Mean daily minimum °C (°F)	21.3 (70.3)	20.7 (69.3)	20.3 (68.5)	17.9 (64.2)	14.9 (58.8)	13.2 (55.8)	11.6 (52.9)	13.4 (56.1)	15.6 (60.1)	18.8 (65.8)	20.0 (68.0)	21.1 (70.0)	17.4 (63.3)
Average precipitation mm (inches)	129.2 (5.09)	133 (5.2)	116.3 (4.58)	56.1 (2.21)	21.2 (0.83)	9.9 (0.39)	5.0 (0.20)	6.2 (0.24)	11.0 (0.43)	38.4 (1.51)	66.6 (2.62)	122.2 (4.81)	715.1 (28.11)
Average precipitation days	9.0	8.9	9.2	7.4	6.0	4.7	1.9	1.5	2.1	4.5	6.0	8.5	69.7
Average relative humidity (%)	73.0	75.1	77.0	77.8	77.1	74.5	67.9	62.2	60.2	62.6	66	71	70.4
Source: Servicio Nacional de Meteorología e Hidrología de Bolivia
