= Chaco War =

War between Bolivia and Paraguay (1932 to 1935)

- Part of the interwar period and South American territorial disputes
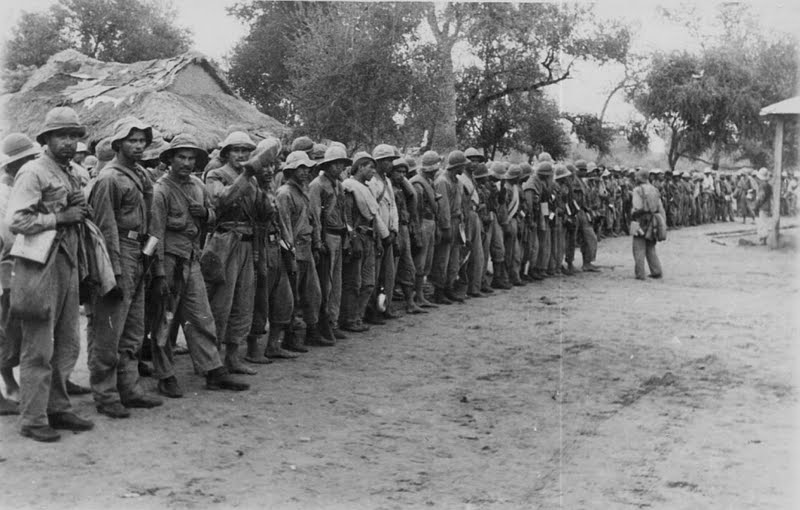
- Paraguayan troops at Alihuatá Fort, 1932 Map of the Chaco War, showing important forts, military outposts, cities, and the Paraguayan advance to the west
Date	9 September 1932 – 12 June 1935 (2 years, 9 months and 3 days)
Location	Gran Chaco, South America
Result	Paraguayan victory
Territorial changes	Most of the disputed area awarded to Paraguay

Belligerents
Paraguay	Bolivia

Commanders and leaders
Eusebio Ayala; José Estigarribia; Luis Irrazábal; Rafael Franco	Daniel Salamanca; José Luis Tejada; Hans Kundt; Enrique Peñaranda; Bernardino Bilbao

Strength
150,000	210,000

Casualties and losses
35,000–50,000 killed; 2,556 captured	50,000–80,000 killed; 40,000 wounded; 21,000 captured

The Chaco War (Spanish: Guerra del Chaco, Guarani: Cháko Ñorairõ) was fought from 1932 to 1935 between Bolivia and Paraguay over control of the northern part of the Gran Chaco region (known in Spanish as the Chaco Boreal), which was thought to be rich in petroleum. The war is also referred to as La Guerra de la Sed (Spanish for "The War of Thirst"), since it was fought in the semi-arid Chaco. It was the first that took place in South America in which modern weapons (such as machine guns, armoured fighting vehicles and airplanes) were used, and also the bloodiest South American war of the 20th century — around 2% of the Bolivian population and 3% of Paraguayans were killed during the conflict.

During the war, both landlocked countries faced difficulties moving arms and supplies through neighbouring countries. Despite Bolivia's income from mining and a larger and better-equipped army, problems with international trade and poor internal communications ultimately turned the tide against it. The war concluded at the Chaco Peace Conference in Buenos Aires in July 1938, at which both countries signed a peace treaty awarding three-quarters of the Gran Chaco to Paraguay.

== Origins ==
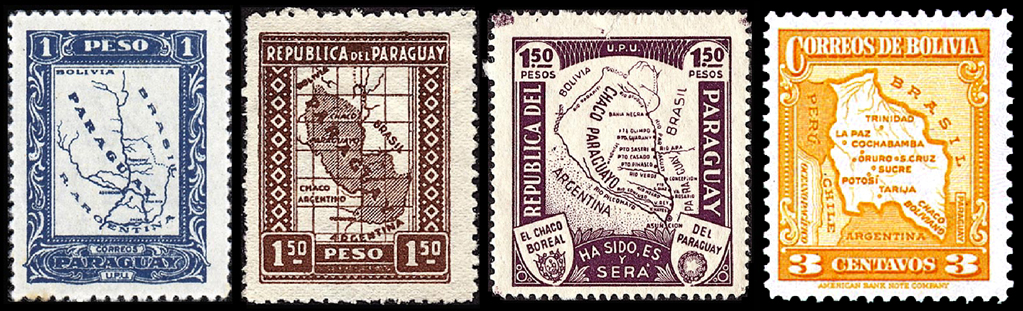
Paraguayan (1924, 1927 and 1932) and Bolivian (1928) stamps. The 1924 Paraguayan stamp shows no border with Bolivia. The 1927 stamp shows a border in the northern part of the Gran Chaco. By 1932, the border had moved even farther north and the disputed territory is called the Chaco Paraguayo; with a slogan saying "was, is and will be [ours]". The Bolivian stamp labels the region as the Chaco Boliviano.

The origins of the war are attributed to a long-standing territorial dispute and to the discovery of oil deposits on the eastern Andes range. After losing territory to neighboring countries in the late 19th century, both Bolivia and Paraguay had become landlocked countries. The 600,000 square kilometres (230,000 square miles) Chaco was sparsely populated, but control of the Paraguay River running through it would provide access to the Atlantic Ocean. Paraguay had lost almost half of its claimed territory to Brazil and Argentina as a consequence of the War of the Triple Alliance (1864–1870), and its economic viability depended on retaining control of the Paraguay River. In 1879, Bolivia lost its Pacific coast to Chile during the War of the Pacific. The 1929 Treaty of Lima ended the hopes of the Bolivian government of recovering a land corridor to the Pacific Ocean, so Bolivia viewed access to the Atlantic Ocean via the Paraguay River as imperative to international trade and further economic development.

In international arbitration, Bolivia argued that the region had been part of the original Spanish colonial province of Moxos and Chiquitos to which Bolivia was heir. Meanwhile, Paraguay based its case on the occupation of the land. Indeed, both Paraguayan and Argentine ranchers were already breeding cattle and exploiting the quebracho forests in the area, and the small population of nomadic indigenous Guaraní-speaking people was related to Paraguay's own Guaraní heritage. As of 1919, Argentine banks owned 400,000 hectares (990,000 acres) of land in the eastern Chaco, and the Casado family, a powerful part of the Argentine oligarchy, held 141,000. The presence of Mennonite colonies in the Chaco, who settled there in the 1920s under the auspices of the Paraguayan government, was another factor in favour of Paraguay's claim.

The impetus for war was exacerbated by a conflict between oil companies jockeying for exploration and drilling rights, with Royal Dutch Shell backing Paraguay and Standard Oil Company supporting Bolivia. The discovery of oil in the Andean foothills sparked speculation that the Chaco might prove to be a rich source of petroleum. Standard Oil was already producing oil from wells in the hills of eastern Bolivia, around Villamontes. In addition to the interests of these companies, Argentina's goal of importing petroleum from the Chaco also contributed to the instigation of the war. In opposition to the "dependency theory" of the war's origins, the British historian Matthew Hughes argued against the thesis that Bolivian and Paraguayan governments were the "puppets" of Standard Oil and Royal Dutch Shell respectively by writing: "In fact, there is little hard evidence available in the company and government archives to support the theory that oil companies had anything to do with causing the war or helping one side or the other during the war". The historian Bret Gustafson, on the other hand, argues that "the blurred lines between the bank and the oil industry show that [Standard Oil] did indeed finance the Bolivian build-up, even if instigating the war was left to Bolivian generals."

=== Prelude to war ===
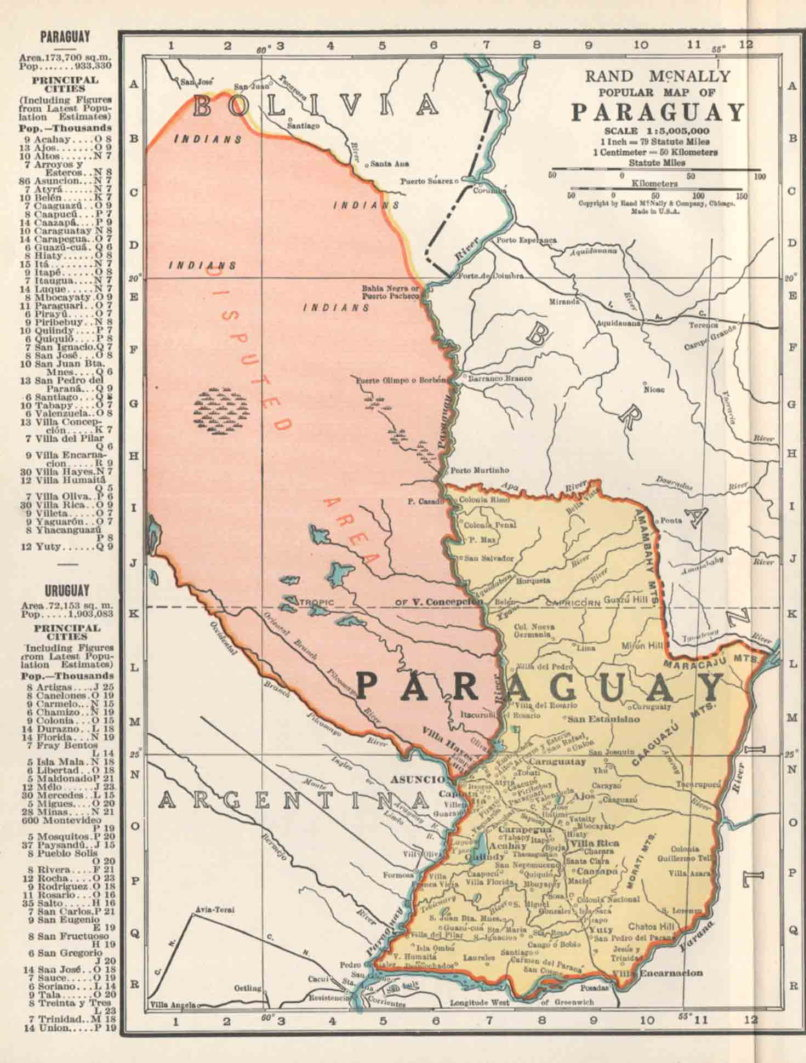
1935 Rand McNally map of Paraguay, showing disputed area and Puerto Pacheco

The first confrontation between the two countries dates back to 1885, when Bolivian president Gregorio Pacheco founded Puerto Pacheco, a port on the Upper Paraguay River, asserting that this new settlement was well inside Bolivian territory. In 1888, the Paraguayan government sent the gunboat Pirapó, commanded by Paraguayan War veteran Domingo Antonio Ortiz, which forcibly evicted the Bolivians from the settlement. Two agreements followed, in 1894 and 1907, which neither the Bolivian nor the Paraguayan government approved. Meanwhile, in 1905, Bolivia — ignoring Paraguayan official protests — founded Ballivián and Guachalla, two new outposts along the Pilcomayo River in the Chaco.

Bolivian penetration in the region went unopposed until 1927, when the first blood was shed over the Gran Chaco. On 27 February, members of a Paraguayan Army foot patrol were taken prisoner near the Pilcomayo River and held in the Bolivian outpost of Fortín Sorpresa, where the commander of the Paraguayan detachment, Lieutenant Adolfo Rojas Silva, was shot and killed in suspicious circumstances. Fortín (Spanish for "little fort") was the name used for the small pillbox and trench-like garrisons constructed by the military forces in the Chaco. The Bolivian government formally regretted the death of Rojas Silva, but Paraguayan public opinion called it "murder". After subsequent talks in Buenos Aires failed to produce any agreement in January 1928, the dispute grew more violent. On 5 December 1928, a Paraguayan cavalry unit overran Fortín Vanguardia, an advance outpost established by the Bolivian army a few kilometres northwest of Bahía Negra. The Paraguayans captured 21 Bolivian soldiers and burned their huts to the ground.

On 14 December 1928, Bolivia retaliated by capturing Fortín Boquerón (which would later be the site of the first major battle of the campaign), killing 15 Paraguayans. The Bolivians also conducted an air strike on Bahía Negra on 15 December, which caused few casualties and little damage. A return to the status quo ante bellum was eventually agreed on 12 September 1929 in Washington, DC, under pressure from the Pan American League, but an arms race had already begun, and both countries were on a collision course. The regular border clashes might have led to war in the 1920s if either side had been capable of waging war. However, neither Paraguay nor Bolivia had an arms industry, and both countries had to import vast quantities of arms from Europe and the United States to arm themselves for the coming conflict. It was this lack of sufficient arms that delayed the outbreak of the war until 1932.

Another contributing factor was the signature of the Chile–Peru Treaty of Lima in 1929, which ruled out a sovereign Bolivian access to the Pacific Ocean. The option to give Bolivia sea access through the territories disputed between Chile and Peru had been promoted by the United States which had been invited to the negotiations by Peru. Having the option to recover an access to the coast disappear was seen as a large setback in Bolivia and arguably it served to harden the Bolivian stance on the Chaco issue.

== Armies ==
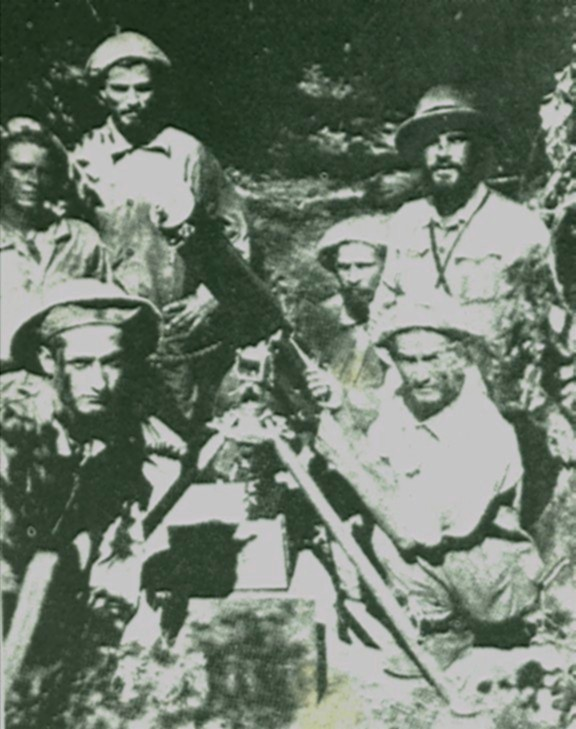
Maxim machine gun manned by Paraguayan soldiers

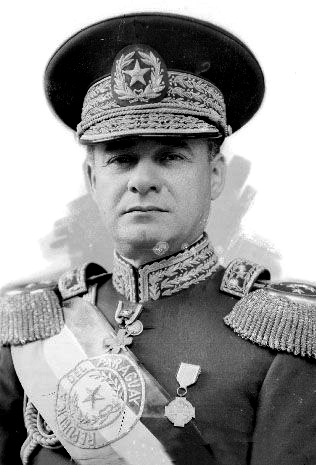
José Félix Estigarribia, commander in chief of Paraguayan army

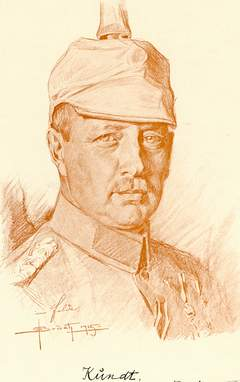
Hans Kundt, commander in chief and Minister of War of Bolivia

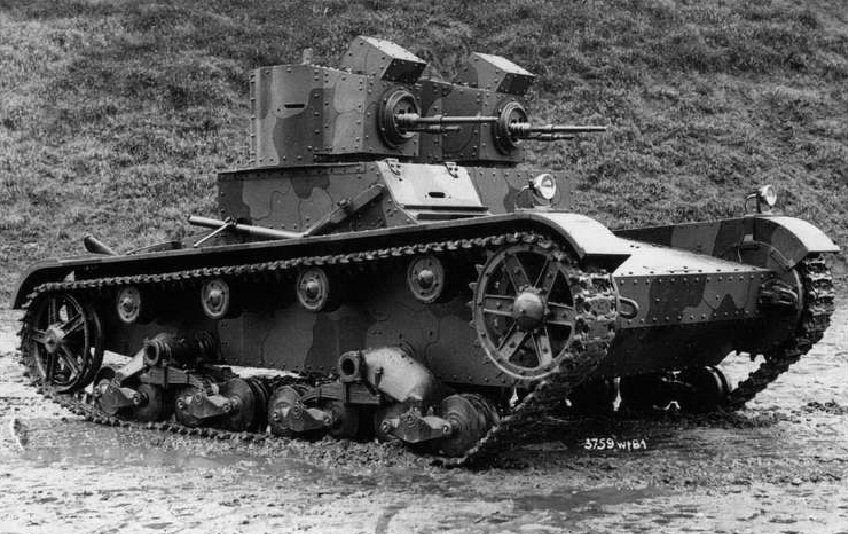
Vickers 6-Ton light tank similar to those deployed by the Bolivian army

Bolivian infantry forces were armed with the latest in foreign weapons, including DWM Maxim M1904 and M1911 machine guns, Czechoslovak ZB vz. 26 and Vickers-Berthier light machine guns, Mauser-type Czechoslovak Vz. 24 7.65 mm rifles (mosquetones) and Schmeisser MP-28 II 9 mm submachine guns. At the outset, the Paraguayan troops used a motley collection of small arms, including the German Maxim, the British Vickers, the Browning MG38 water-cooled machine guns, and the Danish Madsen light machine gun. The primary service rifle was the M1927 7.65 mm Paraguayan Long Rifle, a Mauser design based on the M1909 Argentine Long Rifle and manufactured by the Oviedo arsenal in Spain. The M1927 rifle, which tended to overheat in rapid fire, proved highly unpopular with the Paraguayan soldiers. Some M1927 rifles experienced catastrophic receiver failures, a fault that was later traced to faulty ammunition. After the commencement of hostilities, Paraguay captured sufficient numbers of Bolivian VZ-24 rifles and MP 28 submachine guns (nicknamed piripipi) to equip all of its front-line infantry forces.

Paraguay had a population only a third as large as that of Bolivia (880,000 vs. 2,150,000). However, Paraguay gained the upper hand because of its innovative style of fighting, centered on rapid marches and flanking encirclements, compared to Bolivia's more conventional strategy. In June 1932, the Paraguayan Army totaled about 4,026 men (355 combat officers, 146 surgeons and non-combatant officers, 200 cadets, 690 NCOs and 2,653 soldiers). Both racially and culturally, the Paraguayan Army was practically homogeneous. Almost all of its soldiers were European-Guaraní mestizos. Bolivia's army, however, were mostly descended from the Altiplano's aboriginals of Quechua or Aymará (90% of the infantry troops), while the lower-ranking officers were of Spanish or other European ancestry, and the army commander-in-chief, Hans Kundt, was German. Although the Bolivian army had more manpower, it never mobilized more than 60,000 men, and no more than two-thirds of its army were ever on the Chaco. Paraguay, on the other hand, mobilized its entire army. A British diplomat reported in 1932 that the average Bolivian had never been anywhere close to the Chaco and "had not the slightest expectation of visiting it in the course of his life." Most Bolivians had little interest in fighting, let alone dying, for the Chaco. Furthermore, the typical Bolivian soldier was a Quechua or Aymara peasant conscript accustomed to life high in the Andes Mountains and did not fare well in the low-lying, hot, and humid land of the Chaco.

Many Paraguayan Army commanders had gained combat experience as volunteers with the French Army in World War I. Its army commander, Colonel (later General and then Marshal) José Félix Estigarribia, soon rose to the top of the combat command. Estigarribia capitalized on the native Guarani knowledge of the forest and ability to live off the land to gain valuable intelligence on conducting his military campaigns. Estigarribia preferred to bypass Bolivian garrisons, and his subordinates, such as Colonel Rafael Franco, proved adept at infiltrating enemy lines often by encircling Bolivian strongholds (Paraguay held over 21,000 prisoners-of-war when the war ended, Bolivia some 2,500). Both sides resorted to entrenched strongpoints and used barbed wire, mortars, machineguns, and mines with interlocking fields of fire.

Paraguay's war effort was total. Buses were commandeered to transport troops, wedding rings were donated to buy weapons, and Paraguay had by 1935 widened conscription to include 17-year-olds and policemen. Perhaps the most important advantage enjoyed by Paraguay was that the Paraguayans had a rail network running to the Chaco with five narrow-gauge railroads totaling some 428 kilometres (266 mi) running from the ports on the Paraguay River to the Chaco, which allowed the Paraguayan Army to bring men and supplies to the front far more effectively than the Bolivians ever managed. In 1928, the British legation in La Paz reported to London that it took the Bolivian Army two weeks to march their men and supplies to the Chaco and that Bolivia's "inordinately long lines of communication" would help Paraguay if war broke out. Furthermore, the drop in altitude from 3,700 m (12,000 ft) in the Andes to 150 metres (500 ft) in the Chaco imposed further strain on Bolivia's efforts to supply its soldiers in the Chaco. Bolivia's railroads did not run to the Chaco, and all Bolivian supplies and soldiers had to travel to the front on badly-maintained dirt roads. Hughes wrote that the Bolivian elite was well aware of the logistical problems but that throughout the war, Bolivia's leaders had a "fatalistic" outlook. It took for granted that the fact that the Bolivian Army had been trained by a German military mission whilst the Paraguayan Army had been trained by a French military mission, together with the tough nature of their Quechua and Aymara Indian conscripts and the country's will to win and determination, would give them the edge in the war.

Both armies deployed a significant number of cavalry regiments, but they actually served as infantry since it was soon learned that the dry Chaco could not provide enough water and forage for horses. Only a relatively few mounted squadrons carried out reconnaissance missions at the divisional level.

=== Armor, artillery, and motorized forces ===
At the insistence of the Minister of War General Hans Kundt, Bolivia purchased several light tanks and tankettes for the support of infantry forces. German instructors provided training to the mostly Bolivian crews, who received eight weeks' training. The Vickers light tanks bought by Bolivia were the Vickers Type A and Type B, commissioned into the Bolivian army in December 1932, and were originally painted in camouflage patterns.

Hampered by the geography and difficult terrain of the Gran Chaco, combined with scarce water sources and inadequate logistical preparations, the Bolivian superiority in vehicles (water-cooled), tanks, and towed artillery did not prove decisive in the end. Thousands of truck and vehicle engines succumbed to the thick Chaco dust, which also jammed the heavy water-cooled machine guns employed by both sides. Having relatively few artillery pieces of its own, Paraguay purchased a quantity of Stokes-Brandt Model 1931 mortars. Highly portable (each of three parts could be carried by a soldier) and accurate, with a range of 3,000 yards, the angu'as ("corn-mashers" or "mortar" in Guarani) caused many casualties among Bolivian troops. In the course of the conflict, Paraguayan factories developed their own type of pyrotechnic-ignater hand grenade, the pineapple shaped carumbe'i (Guaraní for "little turtle") and produced trailers, mortar tubes, artillery grenades, and aerial bombs. The Paraguayan war effort was centralized and led by the state-owned national dockyards, managed by José Bozzano. The Paraguayan Army received its first consignment of carumbe'i grenades in January 1933.

=== Logistics, communications, and intelligence ===
The Paraguayans took advantage of their ability to communicate over the radio in Guaraní, a native language not spoken by the average Bolivian soldier. Paraguay had little trouble in transporting its army in large barges and gunboats on the Paraguay River to Puerto Casado and from there directly to the front lines by railway, but most Bolivian troops had to come from the western highlands, some 800 km away and with little or no logistic support. It took a Bolivian soldier 14 days to cross the distance, as opposed to a Paraguayan soldier's four. The heavy equipment used by the Bolivian Army made things even worse. The poor water supply and the dry climate of the region played a key role during the conflict. There were thousands of non-combat casualties from dehydration, mostly by the Bolivian troops.

=== Air and naval assets ===
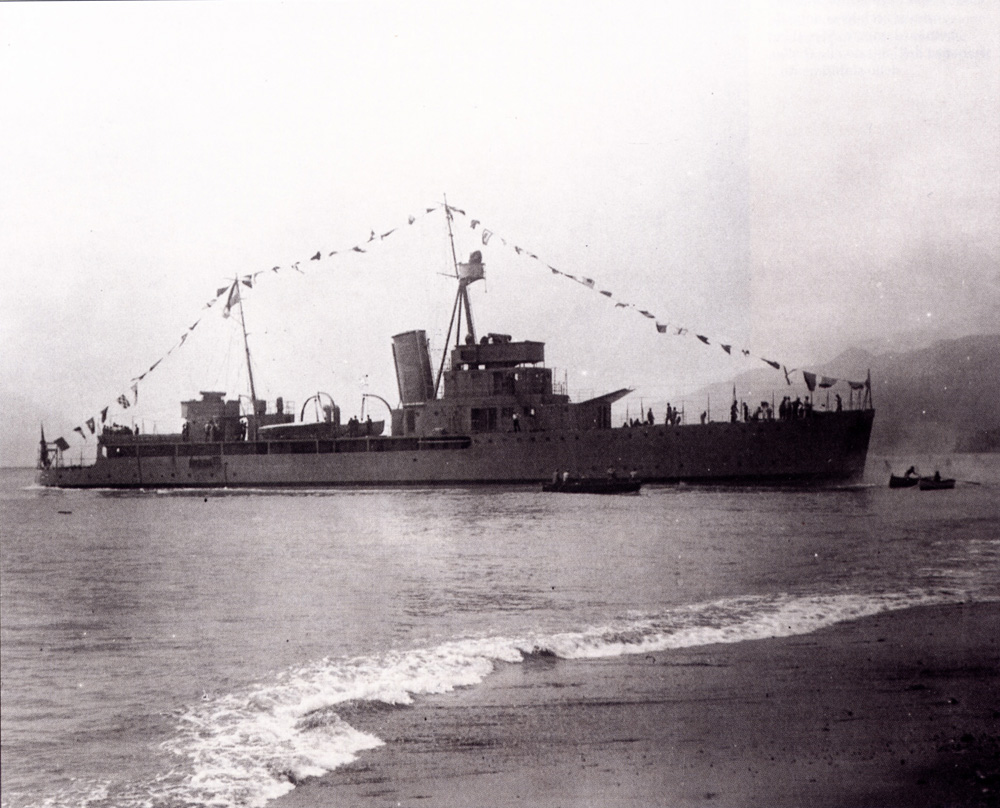
The gunboat Humaitá, shown here without its main armament shortly after being launched in 1930, was an important asset of the Paraguayan Navy

The Chaco War is also important as the first instance of large-scale aerial warfare to take place in the Americas. Both sides used obsolete single-engined biplane fighter-bombers. The Paraguayans deployed 14 Potez 25s, and the Bolivians made extensive use of at least 20 CW-14 Ospreys. Despite an international arms embargo imposed by the League of Nations, Bolivia in particular went to great lengths in trying to import a small number of Curtiss T-32 Condor II twin-engined bombers, disguised as civil transport planes, but they were stopped in Peru before they could be delivered.

The valuable aerial reconnaissance produced by Bolivia's superior air force in spotting approaching Paraguayan encirclements of Bolivian forces was largely ignored by Kundt and other Bolivian Army generals, who tended to dismiss such reports as exaggerations by overzealous airmen.

Four Junkers Ju 52s were purchased by Bolivia, which used the German transports mainly for medical evacuation and air supply. The Ju 52s alone delivered more than 4,400 tons of cargo to the front. On the Paraguayan side, two Travel Air S-6000-B, presumably acquired in Argentina, were extensively used for the same purpose. Both aircraft bear the name Nanawa.

The Paraguayan Navy played a key role in the conflict by carrying thousands of troops and tons of supplies to the front lines via the Paraguay River, as well as by providing anti-aircraft support to transport ships and port facilities.

The Humaitá and Paraguay, two Italian-built gunboats, ferried troops to Puerto Casado. On 22 December 1932, three Bolivian Vickers Vespas attacked the Paraguayan riverine outpost of Bahía Negra, on the Paraguay River, and killed an army colonel, but one of the aircraft was shot down by the gunboat Tacuary. Both surviving Vespas met another gunboat, the Humaitá, while they were flying downriver. Paraguayan sources claim that one of them was damaged. Conversely, the Bolivian army reported that the Humaitá limped back to Asunción seriously damaged. The Paraguayan Navy admitted that Humaitá was struck by machine gun fire from the aircraft but claimed that its armor shield averted damage.

Shortly before 29 March 1933, a Bolivian Osprey was shot down over the Paraguay River, and on 27 April, a strike force of six Ospreys launched a successful mission from the base at Muñoz against the logistic riverine base and town of Puerto Casado, but the strong diplomatic reaction of Argentina prevented any further strategic attacks on targets along the Paraguay River. On 26 November 1934, the Brazilian steamer Paraguay was strafed and mistakenly bombed by Bolivian aircraft while it was sailing the Paraguay River near Puerto Mihanovich. The Brazilian government sent 11 naval planes to the area, and its navy began to convoy shipping on the river.

The Paraguayan navy air service was also very active in the conflict by harassing Bolivian troops deployed along the northern front with flying boats. The aircraft were moored at Bahía Negra Naval Air Base, and consisted of two Macchi M.18s. The seaplanes carried out the first night air attack in South America when they raided the Bolivian outposts of Vitriones and San Juan, on 22 December 1934. The Paraguayan Navy has celebrated ever since the annual "Day of the Naval Air Service" on the anniversary of the action.

The Bolivian Army deployed at least 10 locally-built patrol boats and transport vessels during the conflict, mostly to ship military supplies to the northern Chaco through the Mamoré-Madeira system. The transport ships Presidente Saavedra and Presidente Siles steamed on the Paraguay River from 1927 to the beginning of the war, when both units were sold to private companies. The 50-ton armed launch Tahuamanu, based in the Mamoré-Madeira fluvial system, was briefly transferred to Laguna Cáceres to ferry troops downriver from Puerto Suárez and challenged for eight months the Paraguayan naval presence in Bahía Negra. She was withdrawn to the Itenez River, in northern Bolivia, after Bolivian aerial reconnaissance revealed the actual strength of the Paraguayan Navy in the area.

== Conflict ==
=== Pitiantuta Lake incident ===
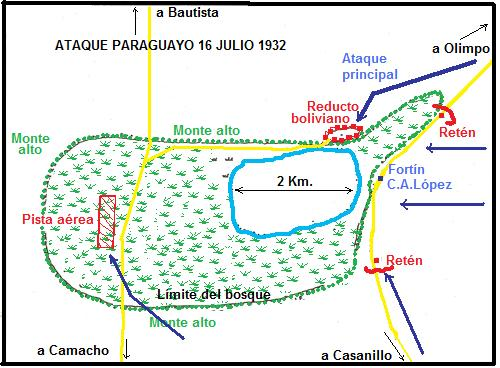
Sketch showing the Paraguayan counterattack on Pitiantutá Lake

On 15 June 1932, a Bolivian detachment captured and burned to the ground the Fortín Carlos Antonio López at Pitiantutá Lake. The captain in charge had disobeyed explicit orders by Bolivian President Daniel Salamanca to avoid provocations in the Chaco region. One month later, on 16 July, a Paraguayan detachment drove the Bolivian troops from the area. The lake had been discovered by Paraguayan explorers in March 1931, but the Bolivian High Command was unaware of that when one of its aircraft spotted the lake in April 1932.

After the initial incident, Salamanca changed his status quo policy over the disputed area and ordered the outposts of Corrales, Toledo, and Fortín Boquerón to be captured. All three were soon taken, and in response, Paraguay called for a Bolivian withdrawal. Salamanca instead demanded that they were included in a "zone of dispute". On a memorandum directed to Salamanca on 30 August, Bolivian General Filiberto Osorio expressed his concerns over the lack of a plan of operations and attached one that focused on an offensive from the north. Quintanilla also asked for permission to capture two additional Paraguayan garrisons: Nanawa and Rojas Silva. In August, Bolivia slowly reinforced its 4,000-man First Bolivian Army, which was already in the conflict zone, with 6,000 men.

The breaking of the fragile status quo in the disputed areas of the Chaco by Bolivia convinced Paraguay that a diplomatic solution on agreeable terms was impossible. Paraguay gave its general staff orders to recapture the three forts. In August, Paraguay mobilized over 10,000 troops and sent them into the Chaco region. Paraguayan Lieutenant Colonel José Félix Estigarribia prepared for a large offensive before the Bolivians had mobilized their whole army.

=== First Paraguayan offensive ===
Fortín Boquerón was the first target of the Paraguayan offensive. The Boquerón compound was guarded by 619 Bolivian troops and resisted a 22-day siege by a 5,000-man Paraguayan force. An additional 2,500 Bolivians attempted to relieve the siege from the southwest but were beaten back by 2,200 Paraguayans, who defended the accesses to the siege area. A few Bolivian units managed to enter Fortín Boquerón with supplies, and the Bolivian Air Force dropped food and ammunition to the besieged soldiers. Having begun on 9 September, the siege ended when Fortín Boquerón finally fell on 29 September 1932.

After the fall of Fortín Boquerón, the Paraguayans continued their offensive and executed a pincer movement, which forced some of the Bolivians to surrender. The Paraguayans had expected to lay a new siege on Fortín Arce, the most advanced Bolivian outpost in the Chaco, but when they got there, they found it in ruins. The 4,000 Bolivians who were defending Arce had retreated to the southeast to Fortín Alihuatá and Saavedra.

=== Bolivian offensive ===
In December 1932, Bolivia's war mobilization had concluded. In terms of weaponry and manpower, its army was ready to overpower the Paraguayans. General Hans Kundt, a former German officer who had fought on the Eastern Front of World War I, was called by Salamanca to lead the Bolivian counteroffensive. Kundt had served intermittently as military advisor to Bolivia since the beginning of the century and had established good relationships with officers of the Bolivian Army and the country's political elites.

The Paraguayan Fortín Nanawa was chosen as the main target of the Bolivian offensive and was to be followed by the command centre at Isla Poí. Their capture would allow Bolivia to reach the Paraguay River and to endanger the Paraguayan city of Concepción. The capture of the fortresses of Corrales, Toledo, and Fernández by the Bolivian Second Corps were also part of Kundt's offensive plan.

In January 1933, the Bolivian First Corps began its attack on Fortín Nanawa. The stronghold was considered by the Paraguayans to be the backbone of their defenses. It had zig-zag trenches; kilometres of barbed wire; and many machine-gun nests, some of which were embedded in tree trunks. The Bolivian troops had stormed the nearby Paraguayan outpost of Mariscal López, which isolated Nanawa from the south. On 20 January 1933, Kundt, who personally commanded the Bolivian force, launched six to nine aircraft and 6,000 unhorsed cavalry supported by 12 Vickers machine guns. However, the Bolivians failed to capture the fort but formed a defensive amphitheater in front of it. The Second Corps managed to capture Fortín Corrales and Fortín Platanillos but failed to take Fortín Fernández and Fortín Toledo. After a siege that lasted from 26 February to 11 March 1933, the Second Corps aborted its attack on Fortín Toledo and withdrew to a defensive line, built 15 km from Fortín Corrales.

After the ill-fated attack on Nanawa and the failures at Fernández and Toledo, Kundt ordered an assault on Fortín Alihuatá. The attack on the fort overwhelmed its few defenders. The capture of Alihuatá allowed the Bolivians to cut the supply route of the Paraguayan First Division. When the Bolivians were informed of the isolation of the First Division, they launched an attack on it. The attack led to the Battle of Campo Jordán, which concluded in the retreat of the Paraguayan First Division to Gondra.

In July 1933, Kundt, still focusing on capturing Nanawa, launched a massive frontal attack on the fort in what came to be known as the Second Battle of Nanawa. Kundt had prepared for the second attack in detail by using artillery, airplanes, tanks, and flamethrowers to overcome Paraguayan fortifications. The Paraguayans, however, had improved existing fortifications and built new ones since the First Battle of Nanawa. The Bolivian two-pronged attack managed to capture parts of the defensive complex but was soon retaken by Paraguayan counterattacks by reserves. The Bolivians lost more than 2,000 men, who were injured or killed in the Second Battle of Nanawa, but Paraguay lost only 559 men who were injured or killed. The failure to capture Nanawa and the heavy loss of life led Salamanca to criticize the Bolivian high command and to order it to spare more men. The defeat seriously damaged Kundt's prestige. In September, his resignation of his position as commander-in-chief was not accepted by the president. Nanawa was a major turning point in the war since the Paraguayan Army regained the strategic initiative, which had belonged to the Bolivians since early 1933.

=== Second Paraguayan offensive ===
In September, Paraguay began a new offensive in the form of three separate encirclement movements in the Alihuatá area, which was chosen since its Bolivian forces had been weakened by the transfer of soldiers to attack Fortín Gondra. As a result of the encirclement campaign, the Bolivian regiments Loa and Ballivián, totaling 509 men, surrendered. The Junín regiment suffered the same fate, but the Chacaltaya regiment escaped encirclement because of the intervention of two other Bolivian regiments.

The success of the Paraguayan Army led Paraguayan President Eusebio Ayala to travel to the Chaco to promote José Félix Estigarribia to the rank of general. In that meeting, Ayala approved Estigarribia's new offensive plan. On the other side, the Bolivians gave up their initial plan of reaching the Paraguayan capital, Asunción, and switched to defensive and attrition warfare.

The Paraguayan Army executed a large-scale pincer movement against Fortín Alihuatá and repeated the previous success of those operations; 7000 Bolivian troops had to evacuate Fortín Alihuatá. On 10 December 1933, the Paraguayans finished their encirclement of the 9th and 4th divisions of the Bolivian Army. After attempts had been made to break through Paraguayan lines and 2,600 of their men had been killed, 7,500 Bolivian soldiers surrendered. Only 900 Bolivian troops, led by Major Germán Busch, managed to slip away. The Paraguayans obtained 8,000 rifles, 536 machine guns, 25 mortars, two tanks, and 20 artillery pieces from the captured Bolivian forces. By then, Paraguayan forces had captured so many Bolivian tanks and armored vehicles that Bolivia was forced to purchase Steyr Solothurn 15 mm anti-tank rifles to fend off its own armor. The remaining Bolivian troops withdrew to their headquarters at Muñoz, which was set on fire and evacuated on 18 December. Kundt resigned as chief of staff of the Bolivian Army.

=== Truce ===
The massive defeat at Campo de Vía forced the Bolivian troops near Fortín Nanawa to withdraw northwest to form a new defensive line. Paraguayan Colonel Rafael Franco proposed to launch a new attack against Ballivián and Villa Montes but was turned down, as Ayala thought that Paraguay had already won the war. A 20-day ceasefire was agreed upon between the warring parties on 19 December 1933. On 6 January 1934, when the armistice expired, Bolivia had reorganized its eroded army and had assembled a larger force than the one involved in its first offensive.

=== Third Paraguayan offensive ===
By early 1934, Estigarribia was planning an offensive against the Bolivian garrison at Puerto Suárez, 145 km upriver from Bahía Negra. The marshes of the Pantanal and the lack of canoes to navigate through them convinced the Paraguayan commander to abandon the idea and to turn his attention to the main front. After the armistice had ended, the Paraguayan Army continued its advance by capturing the outposts of Platanillos, Loa, Esteros, and Jayucubás. After the Battle of Campo de Vía in December, the Bolivian Army built up a defensive line at Magariños-La China. The line, carefully built, was considered to be one of the finest defensive lines of the war. However, a small Paraguayan attack on 11 February 1934, part of a larger battle, managed to breach the line to the surprise of the Paraguayan command, which forced the abandonment of the whole line. A Paraguayan offensive towards Cañada Tarija managed to surround and neutralize 1,000 Bolivian troops on 27 March.

In May 1934, the Paraguayans discovered a gap in the Bolivian defenses, which would allow them to isolate the Bolivian stronghold of Ballivián and to force its surrender. The Paraguayans worked all night to open a new route in the forests to make the attack possible. When Bolivian reconnaissance aircraft noticed the new path being opened in the forest, a plan was made to let the Paraguayans enter halfway up the path and then to attack them from the rear. The Bolivian operation resulted in the Battle of Cañada Strongest between 18 and 25 May. The Bolivians managed to capture 67 Paraguayan officers and 1,389 soldiers. After their defeat at Cañada Strongest, the Paraguayans continued their attempts to capture Ballivián. It was considered to be a key stronghold by the Bolivians, mostly for its symbolic position, since it was the most southeastern Bolivian position that remained after the second Paraguayan offensive.

In November 1934, Paraguayan forces once again managed to surround and to neutralize two Bolivian divisions at El Carmen. The disaster forced the Bolivians to abandon Ballivián and to form a new defensive line at Villa Montes. On 27 November 1934, Bolivian generals confronted Salamanca while he was visiting their headquarters in Villa Montes and forced him to resign. They replaced him with Vice President José Luis Tejada. On 9 November 1934, the 12,000-man-strong Bolivian Cavalry Corps managed to capture Yrendagüé, amidst an offensive aimed at recapturing Picuiba, a position lost months earlier, and to put the Paraguayan Army on the run. Yrendagüé was one of the few places with fresh water in that part of the Chaco. While the Bolivian cavalry was marching towards La Faye from Yrendagüé, a Paraguayan force recaptured all of the wells in Yrendagüé. Upon their return, the exhausted and thirsty Bolivian troops found themselves without water, and the already-weakened force fell apart. Many were taken prisoner, and many of those who had avoided capture died of thirst and exposure after wandering aimlessly through the hot, dry forest. The Bolivian Cavalry Corps had been considered one of the best units of the new army that was formed after the armistice.

=== Espionage and counterespionage ===
In February 1934, Emilio Sfeir—a Lebanese-Bolivian merchant residing in Jujuy, Argentina—masterminded the planning and execution of the capture, in Argentine territory, of Juan Valori, the most important Paraguayan spy of the Chaco War.

=== Last battles ===
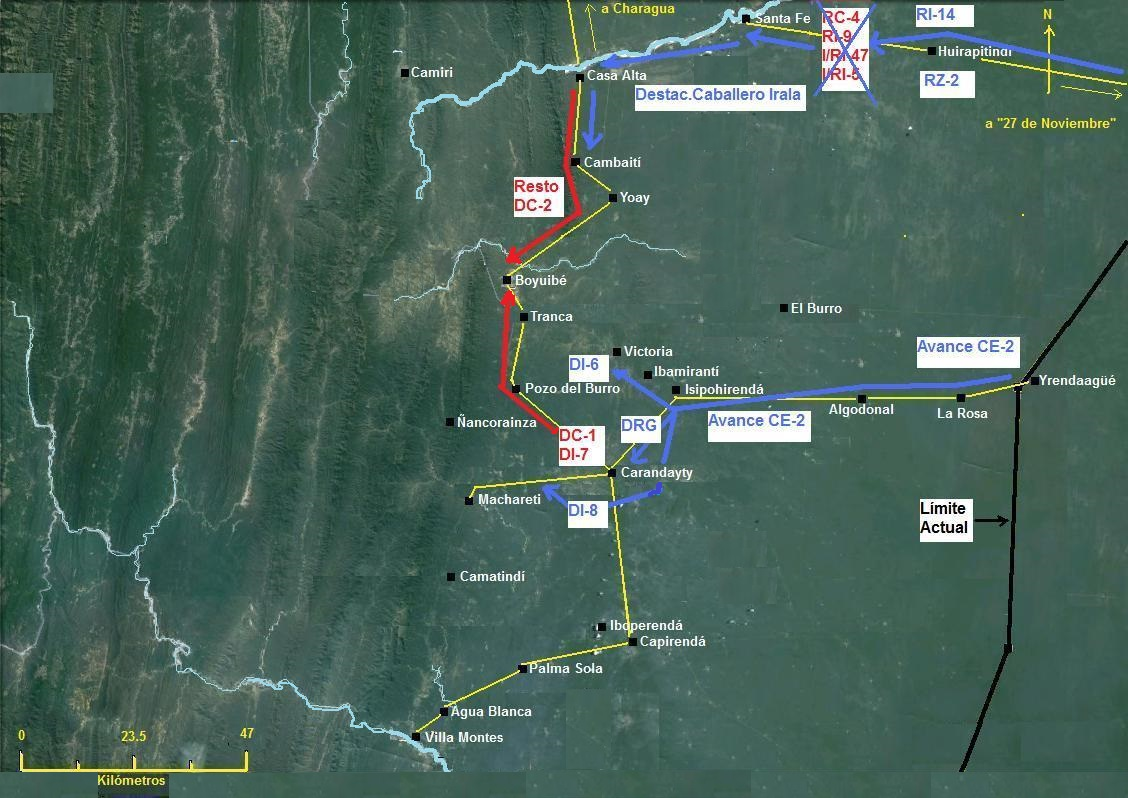
Paraguayan offensive, January 1935. Blue: Paraguayan advances. Red: Bolivian counterattacks.

After the collapse of the northern and the northeastern fronts, the Bolivian defenses focused on the south to avoid the fall of their war headquarters and supply base at Villamontes. The Paraguayans launched an attack on Ybybobó and isolated some of the Bolivian forces on the Pilcomayo River. The battle began on 28 December 1934 and lasted until early January 1935. It caused 200 Bolivian troops to be killed and 1,200 to surrender, but the Paraguayans lost only a few dozen men. Some fleeing Bolivian soldiers were reported to have jumped into the fast-flowing waters of the Pilcomayo River to avoid capture.

After that defeat, the Bolivian Army prepared for a last stand at Villamontes. The loss of that base would allow the Paraguayans to reach the proper Andes. Colonel Bernardino Bilbao Rioja and Oscar Moscoso were left in charge of the defenses after other high-ranking officers had declined. On 11 January 1935, the Paraguayans encircled and forced the retreat of two Bolivian regiments. The Paraguayans also managed in January to cut off the road between Villa Montes and Santa Cruz.

The Paraguayan commander-in-chief, Estigarribia, decided to launch a final assault on Villa Montes. On 7 February 1935, around 5,000 Paraguayans attacked the heavily fortified Bolivian lines near Villa Montes with the aim of capturing the oilfields at Nancarainza, but they were beaten back by the Bolivian First Cavalry Division. The Paraguayans lost 350 men and were forced to withdraw north toward Boyuibé. Estigarribia claimed that the defeat was largely because of the mountainous terrain in which his forces were not used to fighting. On 6 March, Estigarribia again focused all his efforts on the Bolivian oilfields, this time at Camiri, 130 km north of Villa Montes. The commander of the Paraguayan 3rd Corps, General Franco, found a gap between the Bolivian 1st and 18th Infantry regiments and ordered his troops to attack through it, but they became stuck in a salient with no hope of further progress. The Bolivian Sixth Cavalry forced the hasty retreat of Franco's troops to avoid being cut off. The Paraguayans lost 84 troops who were taken prisoner, and more than 500 dead were left behind. The Bolivians lost almost 200 men, but unlike their exhausted enemies, they could afford a long battle of attrition. On 15 April, the Paraguayans punched through the Bolivian lines on the Parapetí River and took over the city of Charagua in a local offensive. The Bolivian command launched a counteroffensive, which forced the Paraguayans 100 kilometres (62 mi) back. Although the Bolivians' plan fell short of its target of encircling an entire enemy division, they managed to take 475 prisoners on 25 April. On 4 June 1935, a Bolivian regiment was defeated and forced to surrender at Ingavi, on the northern front, after a last attempt had been made to reach the Paraguay River. On 12 June, the day that the ceasefire agreement was signed, Paraguayan troops were entrenched only 15 km away from the Bolivian oil fields in Cordillera Province.

The military conflict ended with a comprehensive Paraguayan victory, but from a wider point of view, it was a disaster for both sides. Bolivia's Criollo elite had forcibly pressed large numbers of the male indigenous population into the army even though they felt little or no connection to the nation, and Paraguay fomented nationalist fervor among its predominantly mixed population. On both sides, especially Bolivia, soldiers were ill-prepared for the dearth of water and the harsh conditions of terrain and weather that they encountered. The effects of the lower-altitude climate had seriously impaired the effectiveness of the Bolivian Army. Most of its indigenous soldiers lived on the cold altiplano, at elevations of over 3,700 metres (12,000 ft), and they found themselves at a physical disadvantage when they were called upon to fight in tropical conditions at almost sea level.

== Foreign involvement ==
=== Arms embargo and commerce ===
The Bolivian Army was dependent on food supplies that entered southeastern Bolivia from Argentina through Yacuíba. The army had great difficulty importing arms purchased at Vickers since both Argentina and Chile were reluctant to let war material pass through their ports. The only remaining options were the port of Mollendo, in Peru, and Puerto Suárez, on the Brazilian border. Eventually, Bolivia achieved partial success since Vickers had persuaded the British government to request Argentina and Chile to ease the import restrictions imposed on Bolivia. Internationally, the neighboring countries of Peru, Chile, Brazil, and Argentina tried to avoid being accused of fueling the conflict and so limited the imports of arms to both Bolivia and Paraguay, but Argentina supported Paraguay behind the neutrality façade. Paraguay received military supplies, economic assistance, and daily intelligence from Argentina throughout the war.

The Argentine Army established a special detachment along the border with Bolivia and Paraguay at Formosa Province in September 1932, called Destacamento Mixto Formosa, to deal with deserters from both sides trying to cross into Argentine territory and to prevent any boundary crossing by the warring armies, but the cross-border exchange with the Bolivian army was banned only in early 1934, after a formal protest by the Paraguayan government. By the end of the war, 15,000 Bolivian soldiers had deserted to Argentina. Some native tribes living on the Argentine bank of the Pilcomayo, like the Wichí and Toba people, were often fired at from the other side of the frontier or strafed by Bolivian aircraft, and a number of members of the Maká tribe from Paraguay, led by deserters, who had looted a farm on the border and killed some of its inhabitants, were engaged by Argentine forces in 1933. The Maká had been trained and armed by the Paraguayans for reconnaissance missions. After the defeat of the Bolivian Army at Campo Vía, at least one former Bolivian border outpost, Fortín Sorpresa Viejo, was occupied by Argentine troops in December 1933, which led to a minor incident with Paraguayan forces.

=== Advisers and volunteers ===
A number of volunteers and hired personnel from different countries participated in the war on both sides. The high command staff of both countries was at times dominated by Europeans. In Bolivia, General Hans Kundt, a German World War I Eastern Front veteran, was in command from the beginning of the war to December 1933, when he was relieved after a series of military setbacks. Bolivia was also advised in the last years of the war by a Czechoslovak military mission of World War I veterans. The Czechoslovak military mission assisted the Bolivian military after the defeat of Campo Vía. Paraguay was getting input from 80 former White Russian officers, including two generals, Nikolai Ern and Ivan Belaieff, the latter of whom was part of General Pyotr Nikolayevich Wrangel's staff during the Russian Civil War. In the later phase of the war, Paraguay would receive training from a large-scale Italian mission.

Bolivia had more than 107 Chileans fighting on its side. Three died from different causes in the last year of the conflict. The Chileans involved in the war enrolled privately and were mostly military and police officers. They were motivated by the unemployment caused by both the Great Depression and by the political turbulence in Chile in the early 1930s (after the Chaco War ended, some of the Chilean officers went on to fight in the International Brigades during the Spanish Civil War). The enrollment of Chilean military personnel in the Bolivian Army caused surprise in Paraguay since former Chilean President General Carlos Ibáñez del Campo in 1928 had supported Paraguay after Bolivian reprisals for the destruction of Fortín Vanguardia. The Paraguayan press denounced the Chilean government as not being neutral and went on to claim that the Chilean soldiers were mercenaries. On 12 August 1934, the Chilean ambassador in Asunción was recalled to Santiago in response to official Paraguayan support of the accusations against the Chilean government in the press. Early in the war, however, a few Chilean officers had joined the Paraguayan Army. Pressure from Asuncion led the Chilean Congress on 7 September 1934 to approve a law that made it illegal to join the armies of countries at war. That did not, however, stop the enrollment of Chileans in the Bolivian Army, and it has been argued that Chilean President Arturo Alessandri Palma secretly approved of the practice to get rid of potentially-troublesome elements of the military.

At least two Uruguayan military pilots, Benito Sánchez Leyton and Luis Tuya, volunteered for some of the most daring missions carried out by Paraguayan Air Force Potez 25s, like the resupply of besieged forces during the Battle of Cañada Strongest and the mass air strike on the Bolivian stronghold of Ballivián on 8 July 1934. During the relief mission on Cañada Strongest, Leyton's Potez nº 7 managed to come back home although it had been hit by almost 200 rounds.

Argentina was a source of arms and ammunition for Paraguay. The Argentine military attaché in Asuncion, Colonel Schweizer, continued to advise the Paraguayan command well after the start of hostilities. However, the more valuable contribution to the Paraguayan cause came from Argentine military intelligence (G2), led by Colonel Esteban Vacareyza, which provided nightly reports on Bolivian movements and supply lines running along the border with Argentina. The G2 had broken the Bolivian Army code, reading almost all the encrypted messages for the benefit of the Paraguayan General Staff. Argentine First World War veteran pilot Vicente Almandoz Almonacid was appointed Director of Military Aviation by the Paraguayan government from 1932 to 1933.

The open Argentine support for Paraguay was also reflected on the battlefield when several Argentine citizens, largely from Corrientes and Entre Ríos, volunteered for the Paraguayan Army. Most of them served in the 7th Cavalry Regiment "General San Martín" as infantrymen. They fought against the Bolivian Regiments "Ingavi" and "Warnes" at the outpost of Corrales on 1 January 1933 and had a narrow escape there after they had been outnumbered by the Bolivians. The commander of the "Warnes" Regiment, Lieutenant-Colonel Sánchez, was killed in an ambush set up by the retreating forces, while the Argentine volunteers lost seven trucks. The greatest achievement of "San Martín" took place on 10 December 1933, when the First Squadron, led by Second Lieutenant Javier Gustavo Schreiber, ambushed and captured the two surviving Bolivian Vickers six-ton tanks on the Alihuatá-Savedra road during the Battle of Campo Vía.

A major supporter of Paraguay was US Senator Huey Long. In a speech on the Senate floor on 30 May 1934, Long, a radical populist, claimed the war was the work of "the forces of imperialistic finance" and maintained that Paraguay was the rightful owner of the Chaco but that Standard Oil, which Long called "promoter of revolutions in Central America, South America and Mexico," had "bought" the Bolivian government and started the war because Paraguay had been unwilling to grant it oil concessions. Because Long believed that Standard Oil was supporting Bolivia, he greatly supported Paraguay, and in a speech about the war on the Senate floor on 7 June 1934, he called Standard Oil "domestic murder[er]s", "foreign murder[er]s", "international conspirators", and "rapacious thieves and robbers". As a result, Long became a national hero in Paraguay, and in the summer of 1934, when the Paraguayans captured a Bolivian fort, it was renamed Fort Long in his honor.

== Aftermath ==
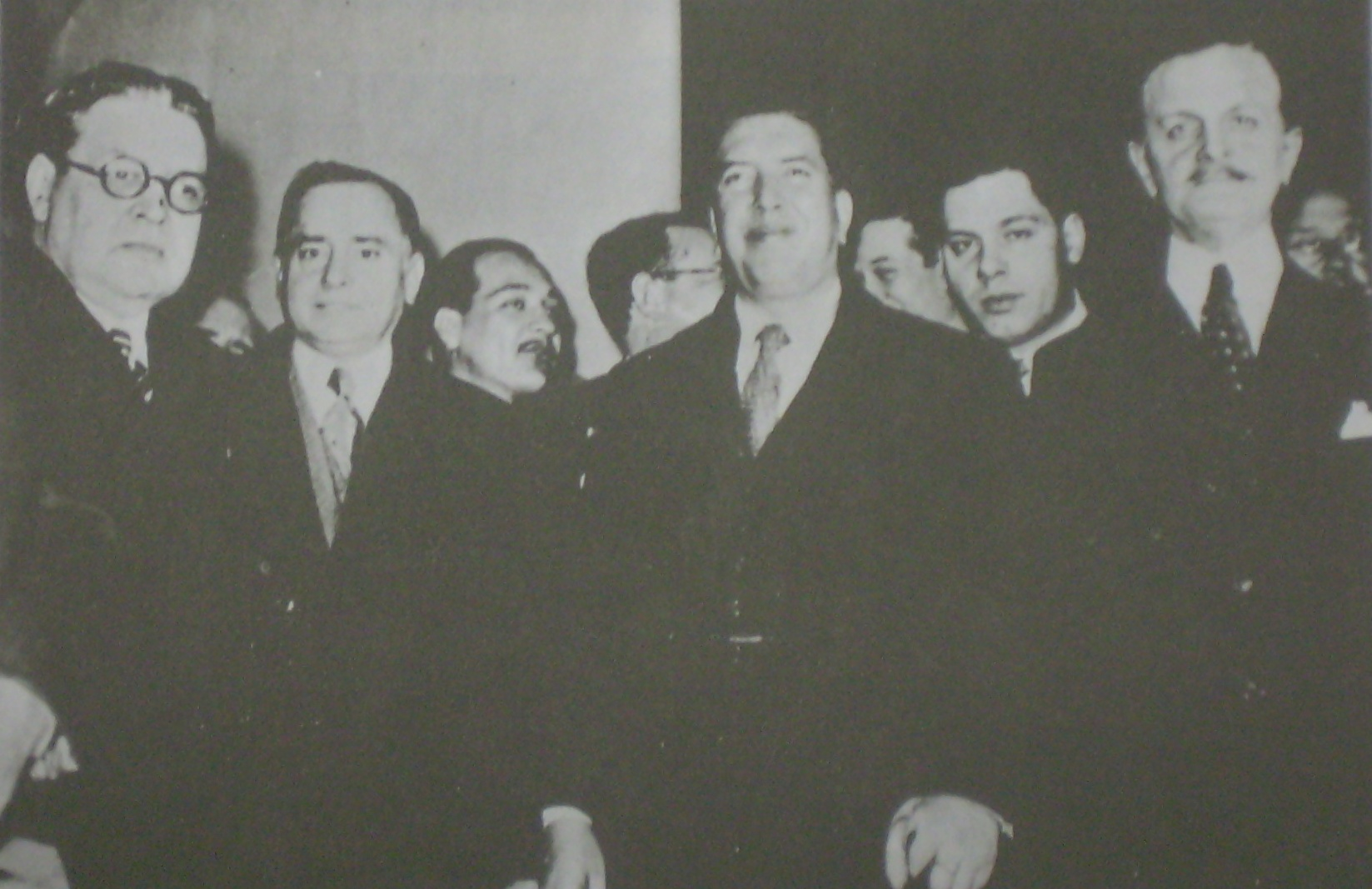
Signatories of the 1938 Peace Treaty gather in Buenos Aires: Eugenio Martínez Thedy (Uruguay), Luis A. Riart (Paraguay), Tomás M. Elío (Bolivia), and Carlos Saavedra Lamas (Argentina)

Peace negotiations were led by Argentina, which sought to position itself as an international leader in South America, much to the detriment of the United States, which had also attempted to mediate in the conflict. When the United States realized that Argentina was unwilling to help end the conflict unless they led the peace negotiations, it gave up its attempts to lead the process.

When a ceasefire was negotiated for noon 12 June 1935, Paraguay had controlled most of the region. The last half-hour had a senseless shootout between the armies. The situation on the ground was recognized in a 1938 truce, signed in Buenos Aires and approved in a referendum in Paraguay, by which Paraguay was awarded three-fourths of the Gran Chaco, 52,000 km^{2} (20,000 sq mi). Bolivia was awarded navigation rights on the Paraguay and Paraná Rivers despite having been provided with such access before the conflict. Bolivia retained the remaining territory, which bordered Puerto Busch.

The war cost both nations dearly. Bolivia lost between 56,000 and 65,000 people, 2% of its population, and Paraguay lost about 36,000, or 3% of its population. Paraguay captured 21,000 Bolivian soldiers and 10,000 civilians (1% of the Bolivian population); many of the captured civilians chose to remain in Paraguay after the war. In addition, 10,000 Bolivian troops, many of them ill-trained and ill-equipped conscripts, deserted to Argentina or injured or mutilated themselves to avoid combat. By the end of hostilities, Paraguay had captured 42,000 rifles, 5,000 machine guns and submachine guns, and 25 million rounds of ammunition from Bolivian forces.

Bolivia's stunning military blunders during the Chaco War led to a mass movement, known as the Generación del Chaco, away from the traditional order, which was epitomised by the Revolutionary Nationalist Movement, which led to the Bolivian National Revolution of 1952.

A final document to demarcate the border based on the 1938 border settlement was signed on 28 April 2009 in Buenos Aires.

Over the succeeding 77 years, no commercial amounts of oil or gas were discovered in the portion of the Chaco awarded to Paraguay. However, on 26 November 2012, Paraguayan President Federico Franco announced the discovery of oil in the area of the Pirity River. He said that "in the name of the 30,000 Paraguayans who died in the war," the Chaco would soon be "the richest oil zone in South America" and "the area with the largest amount of oil". In 2014, Paraguay made its first major oil discovery in the Chaco Basin, with the discovery of light oil in the Lapacho X-1 well.

Oil and gas resources extend also from the Villa Montes area and the portion of the Chaco awarded to Bolivia northward along the foothills of the Andes. Today, the fields give Bolivia the second-largest resources of natural gas in South America, after Venezuela.

== Historiography ==
Professor Bret Gustafson describes popular memory of the Chaco War, still "intensely felt" among Bolivians today, as one in which Bolivians are the "heroes of the Chaco" mobilized to "'defend the oil' from foreign usurpers.'" Other versions of this narrative blame Standard Oil or Argentina for provoking the conflict to rob Bolivia of its oil deposits. Stephen Cote, however, convincingly argues that at the time of the conflict, no known oil deposits existed in the disputed Chaco region. Instead, landlocked Bolivia was hoping to gain control of a river port that might be navigable to the Atlantic.

The war has been widely ignored in the English-speaking world, with the British historian Matthew Hughes noting that one bibliography of books and articles on the war listed some 450 publications, of which only 14 were in English and only 2 were military, as opposed to diplomatic, histories of the war. In contrast, there is an enormous historical literature on the war in Spanish with the subject of the conflict being of lively interest in both Bolivia and Paraguay. Almost all of the historical work done in both nations is dominated by the "heroic" interpretation with the war being presented simply as a matter of willpower, with neither Bolivian nor Paraguayan historians having any interest in other aspects of the war like logistics as a determinate factor. Very typical of the Spanish language histories was Marshal Estigarribia's remark in his memoirs: "But to this organized and arrogant power we intended to oppose the virile tradition of our people and the discipline of our courage." That for him was a sufficient explanation of Paraguay's victory. Paraguayan historians tend to take the view that their nation won because the Paraguayan will to win was stronger, and likewise, Bolivian historians tend to argue that if only the Bolivian Army had fought harder, their nation somehow would have been victorious. Hughes stated that most of the historical work on the Chaco War was not of the highest quality: "It is difficult in the Spanish language literature to discern any clear trends in terms of a conceptual, analytical or theoretical framework with a critical, objective core that unpacks the main military aspects of the conflict, precisely the sort of approach that is becoming commonplace for military studies of other major wars of the contemporary period".

As part of the "heroic" interpretation, writing on the war in both Bolivia and Paraguay tends to be taken up with reminiscences of veterans, with little attempt to link up the experiences of the ordinary soldiers to the broader story of the war and in a way that many outsiders find off-putting to be obsessively making their nations' case for ownership of the Chaco.

The end of the Chaco War is regarded as an important date of the South American Long Peace, a period lacking major interstate wars in South America that continues to the present. Some scholars see the end of Chaco War in 1935 as the beginning of the long peace, while other see this period of peace to have begun earlier in 1884 after the War of the Pacific with the Chaco War being exceptional.

== Cultural references ==
Augusto Céspedes, the Bolivian ambassador to UNESCO, and one of the most important Bolivian writers of the 20th century, wrote several books describing different aspects of the conflict. As a war reporter for the newspaper El Universal, Céspedes witnessed the penuries of the war, which he described in Crónicas heroicas de una guerra estúpida ("Heroic Chronicles of a Stupid War") among other books. Several of his fiction works, which are considered masterworks of the genre, used the Chaco War as a setting. Another diplomat and important figure of Bolivian literature, Adolfo Costa du Rels, wrote about the conflict, and his novel Laguna H3, published in 1938, was also set during the Chaco War.

In The Broken Ear (1937), The Adventures of Tintin alludes to the Chaco War in the border conflict between the fictional South American nations of San Theodoros and Nuevo Rico.

One of the masterpieces of the Paraguayan writer Augusto Roa Bastos, the 1960 novel Hijo de hombre, described in one of its chapters the carnage and harsh war conditions during the Siege of Boquerón. The author himself took part in the conflict by joining the Paraguayan Navy's medical service on board the transport ship Holanda at the age of 17. The Argentine film Hijo de Hombre or Thirst, directed by Lucas Demare in 1961, was based on this part of the novel.

In Pablo Neruda's poem "Standard Oil Company", he referred to the Chaco War in the context of the role that oil companies had played in the war.

The Chaco War, particularly the brutal Battle of Nanawa, played an important role in the adventure novel Wings of Fury, by R. N. Vick.

The Paraguayan polka "Regimiento 13 Tuyutí", composed by Ramón Vargas Colman and written in Guaraní by Emiliano R. Fernández, remembered the Paraguayan Fifth Division and its exploits in the battles around Nanawa in which Fernández fought and was injured. On the other side, the Siege of Boquerón inspired "Boquerón abandonado", a Bolivian tonada recorded by the Bolivian folk singer and politician Zulma Yugar in 1982.

Barrage of Fire by the Bolivian novelist Oscar Cerruto narrated the cruel realities of life in Bolivia during the war through the experiences of a young protagonist.

The film Chaco (2020), directed by Diego Mondaca, follows a company of Bolivian soldiers wandering around the bush during the Chaco War in 1934.

== See also ==
- Bolivia–Paraguay relations
- List of Chaco War firearms
- List of conflicts in South America

== Sources ==
- de Quesada, A. M. (2011). The Chaco War 1932–1935: South America's Greatest Modern Conflict. Osprey Publishing.
- de Ronde, Philip (1935). Paraguay: A Gallant Little Nation, The Story of Paraguay's War with Bolivia. G. P. Putnam's Sons.
- The Chaco Peace Conference: Report of the Delegation of the United States of America to the Peace Conference Held at Buenos Aires July 1, 1935 – January 23, 1939 (1940). Department of State Publication 1466, Conference Series 46.
- English, Adrian (2007). The Green Hell: A Concise History of the Chaco War between Bolivia and Paraguay, 1932–1935. Spellman.
- Farcau, Bruce (1996). The Chaco War: Bolivia and Paraguay, 1932–1935. Praeger.
- Finot, Enrique (1934). The Chaco War and the United States. L&S Print Co.
- Garner, William (1966). The Chaco Dispute; A Study in Prestige Diplomacy. Public Affairs Press.
- Hagerdon, Dan; Sapienza, Antonio Luis (1997), Aircraft of the Chaco War (1932-1935), Schiffer, ISBN 9780764301469
- Rout, Leslie B. Jr. (1970). Politics of the Chaco Peace Conference, 1935–1939. University of Texas.
- Sapienza, Antonio Luis (2018). The Chaco Air War 1932–35: The First Modern Air War in Latin America. Helion & Co.
- Sapienza, Antonio Luis & Pelaez, Jose Luis Martinez (2020). The Chaco War 1932–1935: Fighting in the Green Hell. Helion & Co.
- von Rauch, Georg (n.d.). "The Green Hell Air War". Air Enthusiast Quarterly (2): 207–213.
- Zook, David (1960). The Conduct of the Chaco War. Bookman.
