= Battle of Nanawa =

Battle of Nanawa can refer to two different battles during the Chaco War

- First Battle of Nanawa
- Second Battle of Nanawa
