= Charagua Iyambae =

Charagua Charagua Iyambae (Guarani)
- Native Community Land
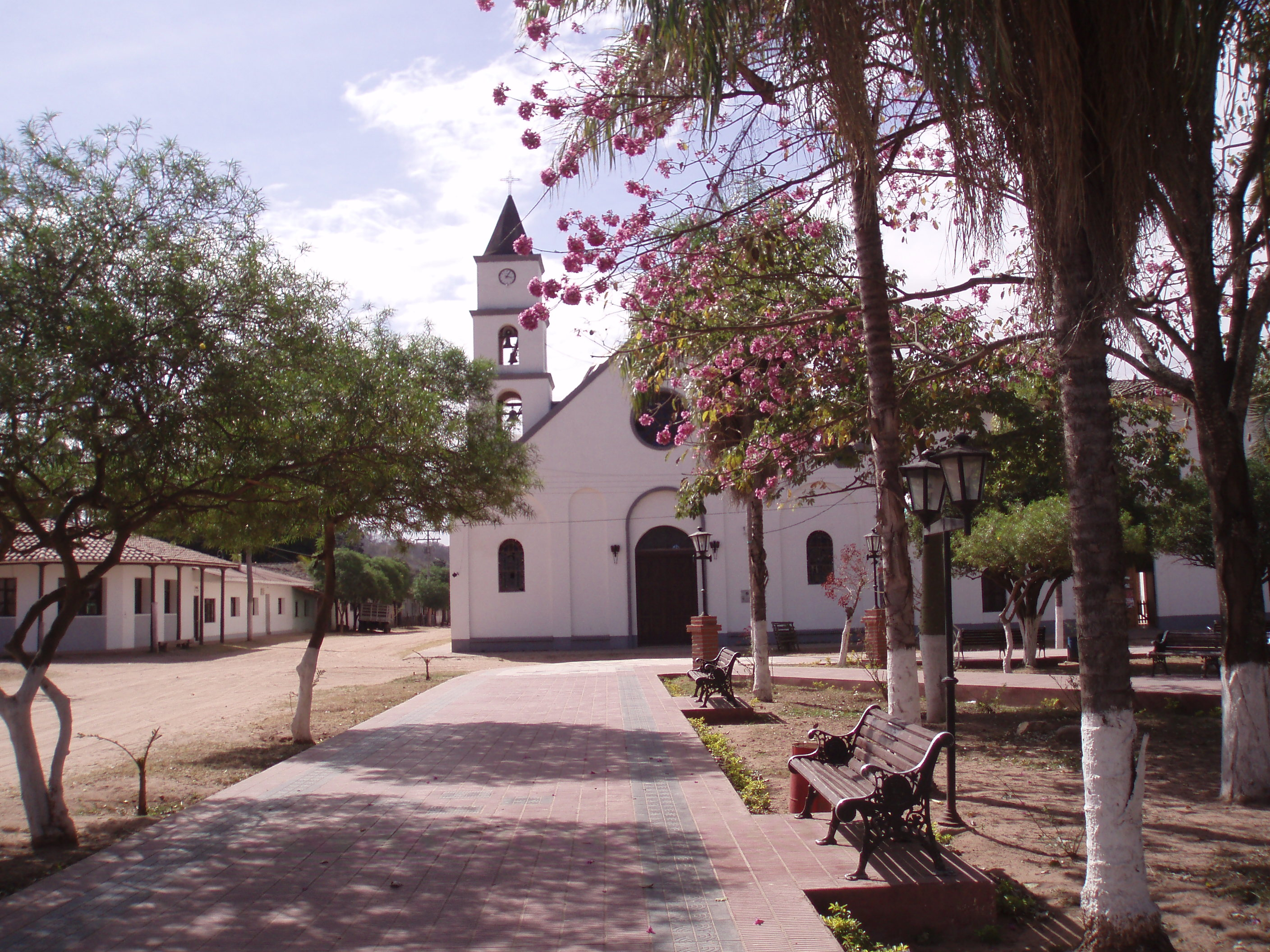

- Flag

- Location of Charagua Iyambae within Bolivia
- Charagua Iyambae and its local surroundings
- Country: Bolivia
- Department: Santa Cruz
- Province: Cordillera

Area
  - Native Community Land: 70,954 km^{2} (27,395 sq mi)

Population (2024)
  - Native Community Land: 38,420
  - Density: 0.54/km^{2} (1.4/sq mi)
  - Urban: 5,654
  - Rural: 32,766
  - Indigenous ethnicities: Guaraní: 19,770 (51%); Unspecified Indigenous: 1,731 (5%); Quechua: 739 (2%)
- 2024 Bolivian census
- Time zone: UTC-4 (BOT)
- Geocode: 070702 (INE code); BO070702 (OCHA P-code)
- Climate: BSh

Charagua Iyambae, commonly called simply Charagua, is an autonomous Bolivian territory situated in Cordillera Province of Santa Cruz Department and in the Chaco region. Its seat is the town of Charagua.

On 8 January 2017, Charagua converted into a self-governing Indigenous territory, replacing its prior administration, Charagua municipality. This conversion also included a change of name to Charagua Iyambae.

With a surface area of 71 745 km², Charagua Iyambae is the largest local territorial entity in Bolivia. It covers around 23% of Santa Cruz Department and 6.5% of Bolivia as a whole.

Charagua is one of the Bolivian territories that has the greatest number of Guaraní residents, who have launched demands for three territories. It was also the first Bolivian municipality to implement indigenous autonomy.

It is bordered to the north by Chiquitos Province, to the south by Paraguay and Boyuibe municipality, to the east by Germán Busch Province, and to the west by the municipalities of Cabezas, Gutiérrez, and Camiri.
