= Campo Vía pocket =

1933 battle of the Chaco War

- Part of the Chaco War
Date	November – December 1933
Location	Gran Chaco 23.2607456°S 59.9409771°W
Result	Paraguayan victory

Belligerents
Bolivia	Paraguay

Commanders and leaders
Hans Kundt; Carlos Banzer (Commander of the 9 Division); Gonzales Quint (Commander of the 4° División)	José Félix Estigarribia; Rafael Franco

Strength
9,000 troops	17,000 troops

Casualties and losses
~8,100 killed or captured	Unknown
- Location within Paraguay Campo Vía pocket (South America) Campo Vía pocket (America)

The battle of the Campo Vía pocket was a decisive engagement of the Chaco War between Paraguay and Bolivia which took place in December 1933. It was the aftermath of the most prominent battles of the Chaco War, the Second Battle of Alihuatá. Lt Col José Félix Estigarribia, with a massive force of several divisions of the Paraguayan Army, was able to surround two Bolivian divisions around the outpost of Alihuatá. The encircled troops were forced to capitulate due to lack of supplies on 11 December. Up to 2,000 Bolivian soldiers were killed and 7,000 captured. Barely 900 Bolivian troops escaped, led by Colonel Germán Busch. Subsequently, the Paraguayan troops expelled the Bolivian army from the eastern region of Chaco by the end of 1933, forcing the resignation of German General Hans Kundt from the Bolivian High Command.
