= First Battle of Alihuatá =

1933 battle of the Chaco War

- Part of Chaco War
Date	March 10–13, 1933
Location	Chaco Boreal, Santa Cruz, Bolivia
Result	Bolivian Victory: Occupation of Alihuatá

Belligerents
Bolivia	Paraguay

Commanders and leaders
Hans Kundt; Victorino Gutiérrez	José F. Estigarribia; Captain Chircoff

Units involved
Illimani; Chacaltaya and Campos regiments	Chircoff Battalion

Strength
1,000 Infantry	250 Infantry

Casualties and losses
238 casualties	Unknown

The First Battle of Alihuatá was a battle of the Chaco War between Bolivia and Paraguay, it took place between March 10 to 13 of 1933 and culminated in the occupation of the Alihuatá fort by the Bolivian army and the withdrawal of the small Paraguayan unit that defended it, allowing the Bolivian 9th Division to cut the supply route from Arce to the Paraguayan 1st Division that was fighting in the area of "Kilometer 7" and Campo Jordán south of Alihuatá.

== Background ==
Since January 1933, the 9th Bolivian Division had been forming at Puesto Sosa, 15 kilometers to the left of the "kilometer 7" positions. Originally, General Kundt wanted to have a force as a general reserve with the assurance that the convergent action of the four front-line Divisions towards Isla Poí would achieve their objective. Given that his offensive had been halted in its initial phase, after two months of intense fighting, Kundt accepted the suggestion of the First Corps command to attack the Alihuatá fort by the same path that Captain Ustárez and Rivas had used before the war. .

The 9th and 4th Divisions that were to participate in this operation came to report directly to Kundt, who visited the commandos to coordinate the tactical movements. Several chiefs pointed out to him that the 1,500 men of the 4th Division and the 1,500 men of the 9th were scarcely available for a maneuver of the scale that was being planned. They assumed that the Paraguayan units in "Kilometer 12" and in Alihuatá could be more numerous. Kundt argued that his strategy did not depend on numerical superiority over the enemy but on the greater mobility, thrust and striking force of the Bolivian troops.

== The Plan ==
While the Bolivian 4th Division tied up the enemy troops fighting in "Kilometer 7", the 9th Division was going to penetrate the road that was being opened, parallel to the Saavedra-Alihuatá road, and then make a diversion to the right and emerge by surprise near the Alihuarta fort. In this way, the 1st Paraguayan Division, which was fighting in 'Kilometer 7', would be isolated from its supply base.

With the greatest secrecy, work was carried out at night on the opening of the road to prevent the Paraguayan aeroplanes from detecting the sappers. To prevent the Paraguayan patrols that could leave "Kilometer 12" towards the Sosa post from discovering the arrangements, the RI-36, commanded by Colonel González Portal, placed itself as a stopper against the extreme right of the Paraguayan trenches. However, upon detecting the presence of these enemy forces in that sector, the Paraguayan command sent a detachment of 100 men in that direction, under the command of Captain Kassianoff, to attack them.

== The Battle ==
The Bolivian 9th Division began its advance in late February. Its vanguard was made up of a squad of the "Lanza" regiment and the bulk of the "Campos", "Chacaltaya", "Illimani" regiments, part of the RI-36, plus the Mendivil battery with four Schneider 75 mm guns. As of March 1, the unit had advanced about 42 km, finding abundant water in a canyon that extended to the right in the direction of Alihuatá.

Major Alfredo Rivas carried out an exploration with the riders of the "Lanza", arriving smoothly as far as Charata, to the west and in the vicinity of the target. The "Campos" regiment took the lead for the attack, followed by "Chacaltaya" and "Illimani" while the RI-36 stayed in Charata to protect the rear. The artillery personnel continued to work on the opening of the road as they approached with their guns.

On March 10, an advanced Paraguayan patrol detected the Bolivian approach and gave the alarm to Captain Chircoff who was commanding the fort. The Campos regiment deviated a bit to the north to cut off the Alihuatá-Arce road, the Chacaltaya advanced frontally to the east and the Illimani moved to the south side to cut the Alihuatá-Saavedra road.

On the 11th, when approaching the open field that surrounded the fort, the commander of the "Chacaltaya" paused the attack so that the "Illimani" could finish its movement to the right. At this time, he received an admonishment from the divisional command about his delay and, annoyed by this, he appeared at the command post of one of his companies and gave the absurd order: "Go ahead, the fort is unoccupied."

The infantrymen advanced trying to hide between the few bushes but without being able to evade the enemy fire. At four in the afternoon the combat reached its climax: the Bayá company was annihilated. The Bolivian "Illimani" regiment, which was receiving its baptism of fire, got confused in the mountains and fired at their own men, the "Chacaltaya" in front, whose end it had not yet exceeded. The Bolivians retreated into the mountains and took advantage of the night to reorganize themselves. On March 12, the "Campos" regiment mounted on the road to Arce, which was its objective, and the "Illimani" did the same on his. On the 13th, two patrols from the "Chacaltaya" advanced cautiously before the silence of the defenders, finding that the Alihuatá fort had been vacated by the enemy, taking advantage of the darkness of the night.

The rest of the regiment barricaded themselves in front of the outpost facing east and north. The 250 defenders had left the fort, leaving 40 mules, 12 head of cattle, a cart with food, 4 boxes of ammunition, 100 saddles, sabers, several rifles and some medical supplies.

The casualties in the Bolivian division were disproportionate to the objective achieved. The nervousness and lack of professional capacity with which an attack that lacked the surprise factor was conducted allowed the few defenders, who were already aware of the Bolivian presence, to produce 238 casualties (including some officers) out of a total of 1000 that they had all three regiments.

The surprise appearance of a new Bolivian division (not foreseen by the intelligence service) in the center of his defences was a setback for Colonel Estigarribia, who also did not expect such a daring attack, much less an attack on the Alihuatá fort. This fort was an important stopover in the Paraguayan supply line to the Paraguayan 1st Division, which at that time was fighting to the south, off Saavedra.

== Aftermath ==
With great haste, Estigarribia took some measures to dislodge the dangerous Bolivian intrusion, drawing forces from Fernández (Herrera) and Pirizal. A unit of veterans was brought in from Nanawa, joined by a contingent of recruits recently arrived from Asunción. Thus a detachment of 1,300 men was formed, which was placed under the command of Captain Samaniego. In the Bolivian countryside, Colonel Victorino Gutiérrez, who had commanded the Bolivian 9th Division until the capture of Alihuatá, was replaced by his chief of staff, Lieutenant Colonel Bernardino Bilbao Rioja. On March 15 and 16, the "Campos" regiment and the "Chacaltaya" left wing stoically resisted the attacks of the Samaniego detachment.

After the reconquest of Alihuatá, pressure from the Bolivian 4th Division forced the 1st Division to withdraw from the trenches of 'Kilometer 12' towards Gondra, where a new fighting front was established. This fact frustrated the involvement that Estigarribia was preparing in Arce on the 9th Division stationed in Alihuatá. Once these maneuvers were completed, Lieutenant Colonel Bilbao Rioja objected to the excessive lengthening of the front, stretching from Corrales to Nanawa as a strategic weakness in the face of an enemy that had become defensive.

== Sources ==
- Querejazu Calvo, Roberto (1981). Masamaclay. Historia política, diplomática y militar de la guerra del Chaco. Cochabamba-La Paz (Bolivia): Los Amigos del Libro. OCLC 9421198.
- Vergara, Aquiles (1948). Bilbao Rioja, vida y hechos. La Paz (Bolivia): Lit. e Imprentas unidas.
