= Cáceres Lake =

Cáceres Lagoon
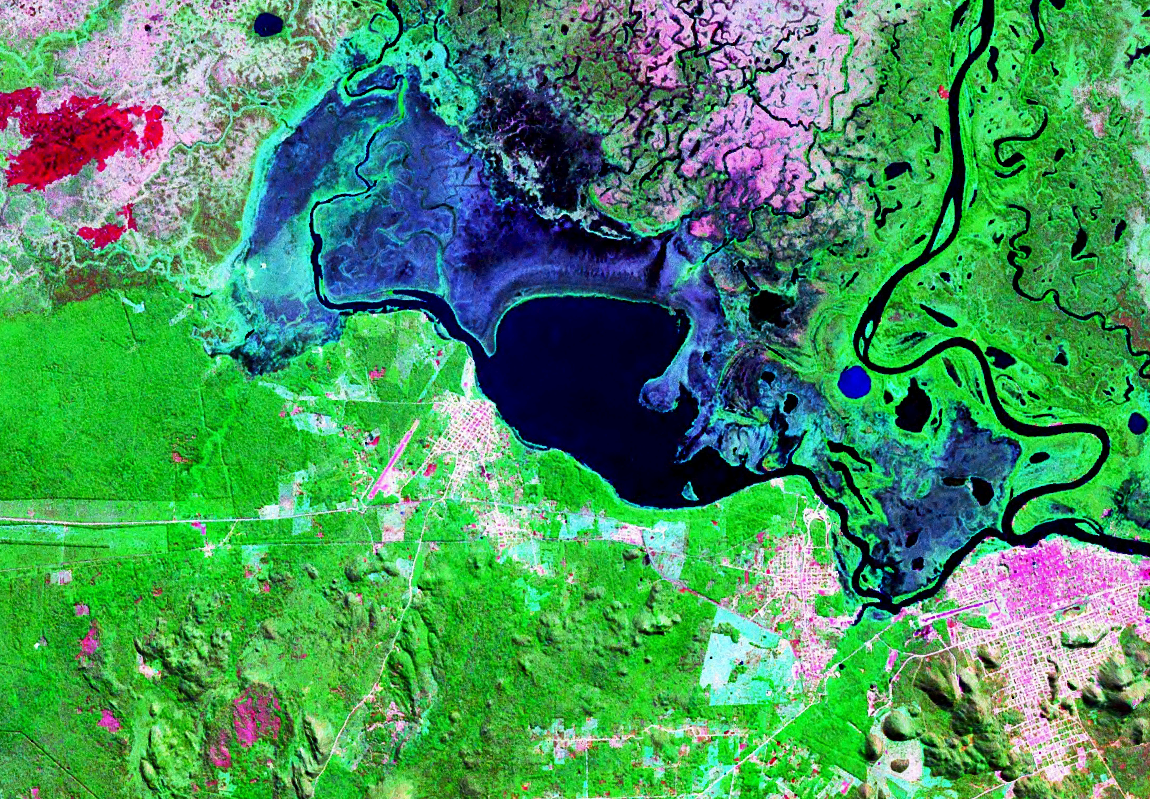
- Cáceres Lagoon Bolivia Satelital map

- Location within Bolivia Location within Brazil Location within South America
- Interactive map of Cáceres Lagoon
- Location: Germán Busch Province, Santa Cruz Department
- Coordinates: 18°56′S 57°48′W
- Primary inflows: El Pimiento River, Sicurí Canal
- Primary outflows: Tamengo Canal
- Basin countries: Bolivia, Brazil
- Surface area: 26.5 to 200 km^{2} (10.2 to 77.2 sq mi)
- Max. depth: 5 m (16 ft)
- Surface elevation: 150 m (490 ft)
- Islands: 1

Cáceres Lagoon is a lagoon in the Germán Busch Province, Santa Cruz Department, Bolivia, that borders Brazil. At an elevation of 150 m, its surface area is 26.5 to 200 km^{2}.
