= Charagua =

Town in Bolivia

Coordinates: 19°47′26″S 63°11′52″W

Charagua is a town in the southern part of Bolivia where the majority of inhabitants are Guarani people. It is the seat of the autonomous indigenous territory Charagua Iyambae (formerly Charagua municipality).

In 2015, Charagua Iyambae became the first Bolivian municipality to have autonomous self-governance by the indigenous population. It is the principal village of the Cordillera province. Most inhabitants speak Guaraní.

== History ==
The city was briefly occupied by the Paraguayan Army in April 1935, during the last stages of the Chaco War, in the Charagua offensive.

Charagua consists of two separate towns, the old town and a settlement along the railway track, 3.2 km (2 miles) east. The railway connects Santa Cruz de la Sierra to Pocitos on the border with Argentina.

The organization Peasant Research and Promotion Center (CIPCA) has been active in Charagua already for more than three decades. The house of the Guarani (Arakwarenda) is located north of the town. There is an experimental farm adjacent to Arakwarenda.

== Gallery ==
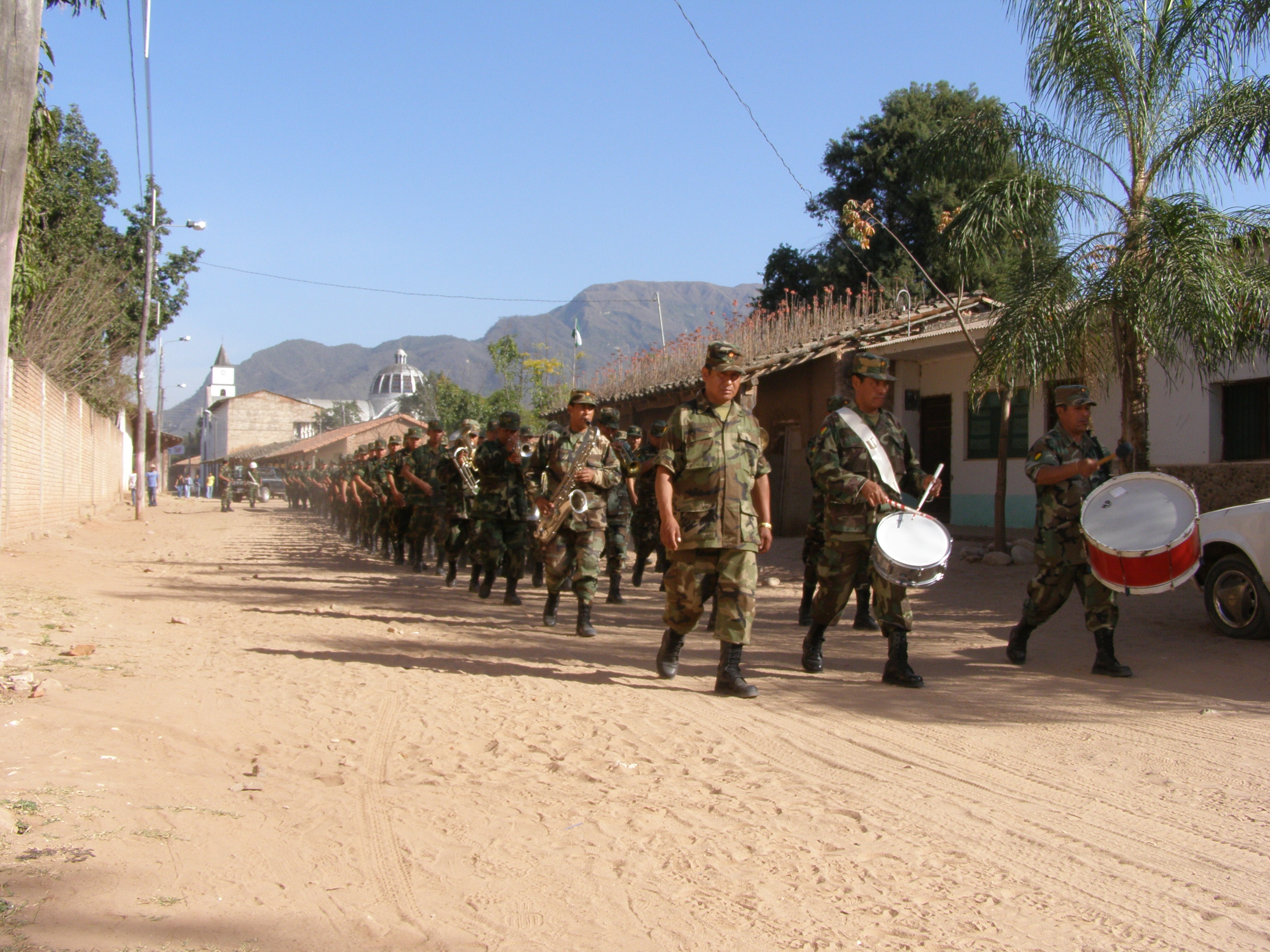

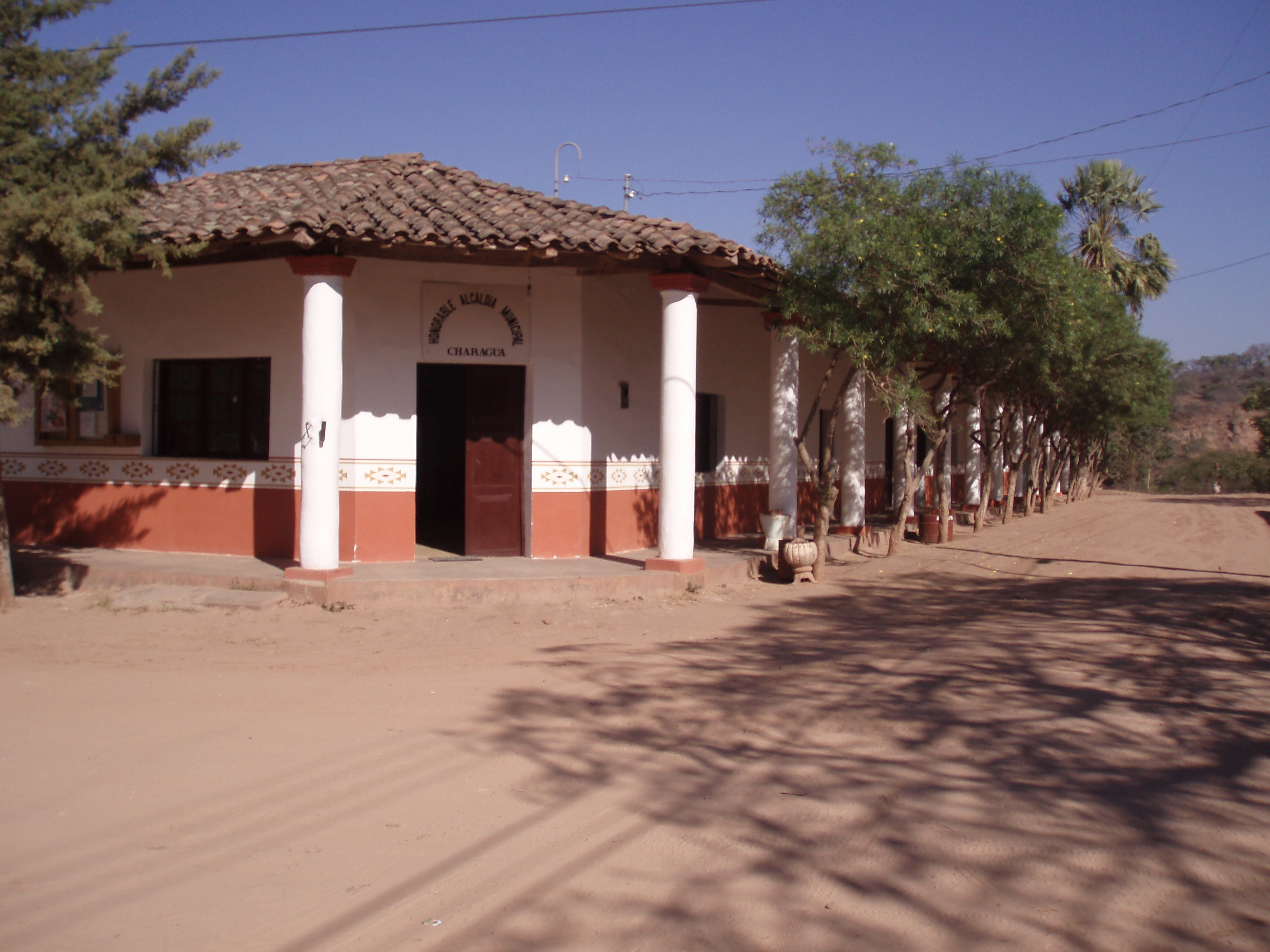

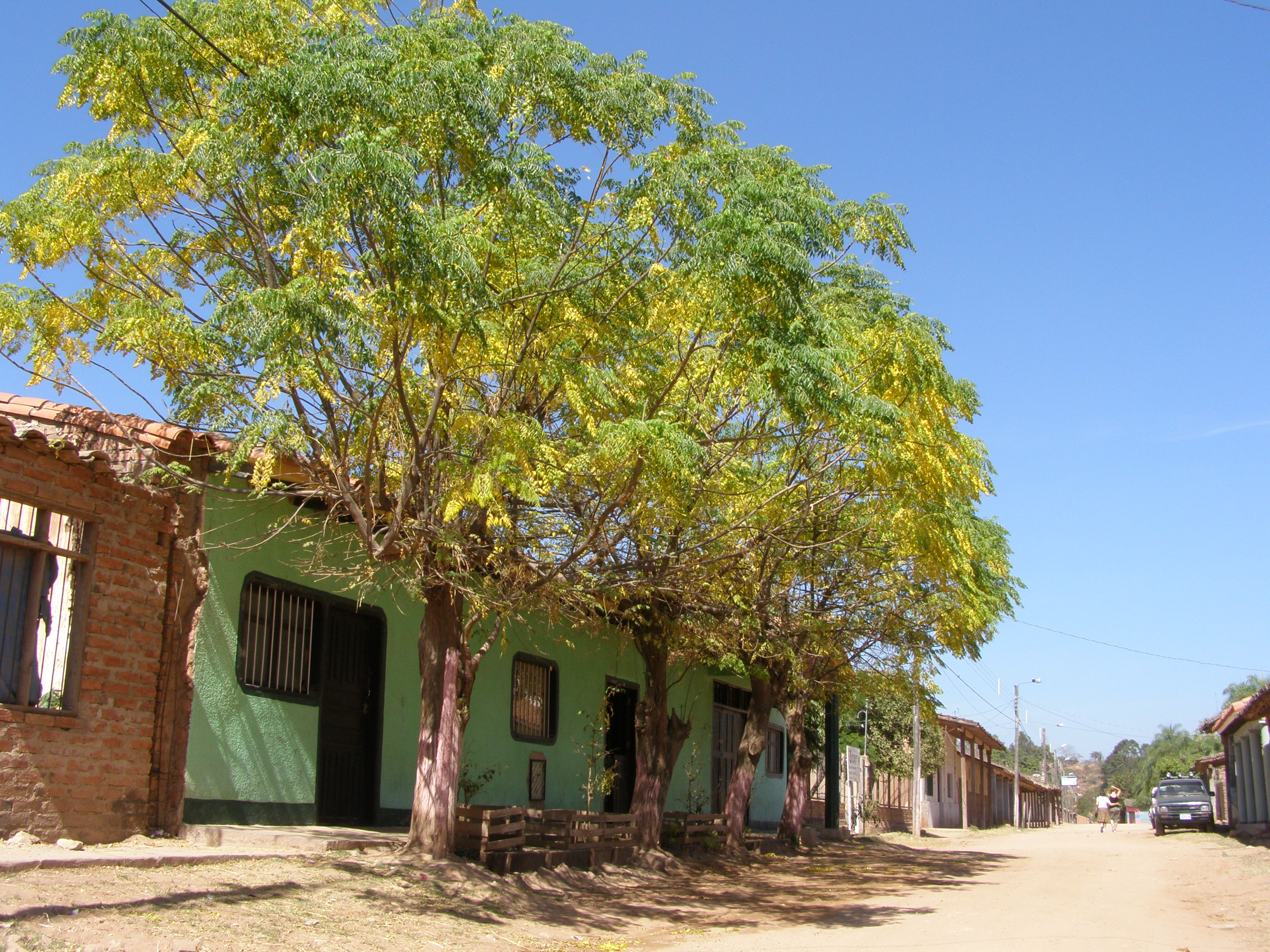

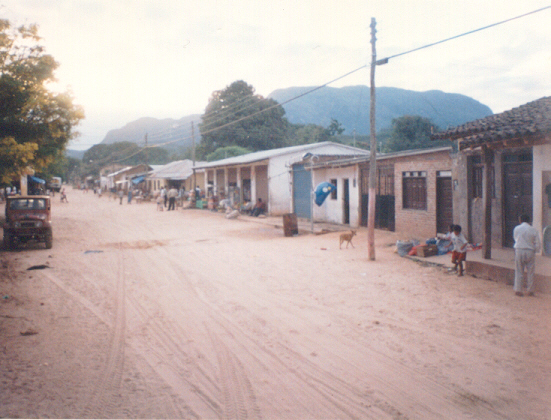
