= Hans Kundt =

Bolivian general from Germany (1869–1939)

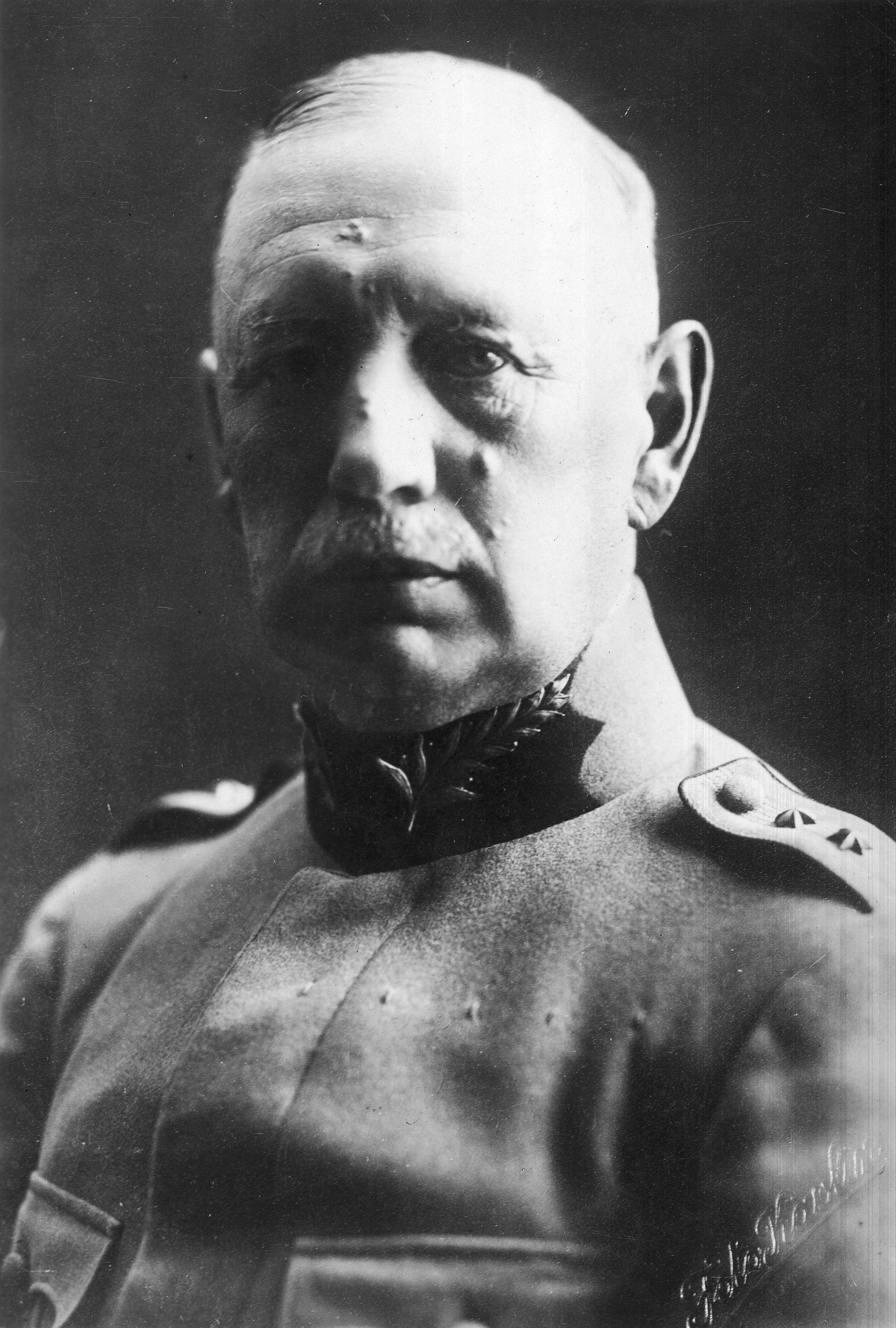
- Hans Kundt c. 1923–1928, in a general's uniform of the Bolivian Army.
- Born: Hans Anton Wilhelm Friedrich Kundt; 28 February 1869; Neustrelitz, North German Confederation
- Died: 30 August 1939 (aged 70); Lugano, Switzerland
- Military career
- Allegiance: German Empire (to 1918); Bolivia (to 1933)
- Branch: Deutsches Heer; Bolivian Army
- Service years: 1888–1933
- Rank: Generalleutnant (Germany); General (Bolivia)
- Commands: Deutsches Heer; Bolivian Army
- Conflicts: World War I Chaco War

Minister of War and Colonization of Bolivia
- In office 23 January 1923 – 10 March 1923
- President: Bautista Saavedra
- Preceded by: Hernando Siles
- Succeeded by: Juan Manuel Sainz

Hans Anton Wilhelm Friedrich Kundt (28 February 1869 – 30 August 1939) was a German military officer. He was the primary military figure of Bolivia during the two decades preceding the Chaco War.

== Beginnings and World War I ==
Kundt was born in 1869 in the Grand Duchy of Mecklenburg-Strelitz, in a family of military officers. He was commissioned in 1888, receiving the rank of Fähnrich in 1889. In 1902 he served as captain of the Generalstab (General Headquarters) in Berlin and later commanded a regiment on the Russian Front. Kundt arrived in Bolivia in 1908, as head of a German military training mission. He enjoyed an excellent relationship with the Bolivians and acquired a reputation as a competent peacetime administrator and troop trainer. In 1911, he began the reorganisation of the Bolivian Army, following the pattern of the Prussian Army.

At the start of First World War, Kundt returned to Germany. In 1914 he was commander of a regiment on the Eastern Front and achieved the rank of Generalleutnant. He served as chief of staff on the corps level, and as a brigade commander. After the First World War, Kundt retired at the rank of colonel, although he was conferred the rank of general upon retiring.

== In Bolivia ==
Following the First World War, Kundt again returned to Bolivia. There he was offered the posts of Chief of Staff of the Army, and of Minister of War, with the rank of general. Kundt accepted the posts, adopted Bolivian citizenship and headed the program of rearming Bolivia during the 1920s, and the planning to occupy the Chaco. As a general he continued the reorganisation he had begun in 1911, and became very popular as – unlike much of the Bolivian officer corps – he was concerned with the well-being of the troops. In 1923 he was named Minister of War. After the fall of president Hernando Siles Reyes in a coup in 1930, Kundt was exiled for having collaborated with that administration.

== Chaco War ==
Only two years later, Kundt was brought back to direct the Bolivian Army against Paraguay in the Chaco War, and was appointed both Commander in Chief and Minister of War. In that role, Kundt was instrumental in Bolivia's purchase of a large amount of modern arms and equipment, including an insistence that Bolivia include a number of light tanks and armoured vehicles in the order. Kundt later boasted to an American reporter that "if the Paraguayans ever dare to take up the Chaco issue again, I shall make a military walkover right over to their capital of Asunción, and settle the matter once and for all".

However, Kundt's directing of the Bolivian military campaign was problematic. Bolivia's tanks and tankettes proved almost useless in navigating the thick scrub and quebracho of the Gran Chaco, and were easily isolated and destroyed or seized by Paraguayan infantry using grenades and mortars. By 1934, Paraguay was employing a large number of captured Bolivian Army automatic weapons and trucks against their former owners. The loss of the tanks forced the Bolivian government to purchase a quantity of bipod-mounted Oerlikon SSG36 anti-tank rifles to deal with their potential recovery and use by the Paraguayan army.

The valuable aerial reconnaissance produced by Bolivia's superior air force (Bolivian pilots spotted several approaching Paraguayan encirclements of Bolivian forces) was largely ignored by Kundt, who dismissed the reports as exaggerations by overzealous airmen. Kundt repeatedly eschewed flanking manoeuvres for futile frontal infantry assaults against well-defended Paraguayan positions using machine guns with interlocking fire zones. Kundt also proved a failure at logistics, and large Bolivian forces were regularly forced to surrender for lack of water to their opponents. His refusal to develop an effective intelligence service meant that the Bolivian Army could not track enemy movements. This allowed the Paraguayans to repeatedly surround and destroy Bolivian forces.

After Bolivia's defeat in Campo Vía, Kundt was relieved of command on 12 December 1933 as Chief of Staff by Bolivian President Daniel Salamanca. Kundt left Bolivia and returned to Germany. Retiring to Switzerland in 1936, Kundt died in Lugano on 30 August 1939 at age 70.

== Evaluation ==
Kundt displayed excellent qualities as an administrator and dedicated instructor, and was concerned for the well-being of his men. However, during World War I Kundt demonstrated a mediocre grasp of tactics, preferring frontal assaults in most situations. Despite his knowledge of staff issues, he was not a good strategist. Despite the Bolivian military's focus on the Chaco in the 1920s, Kundt never visited or familiarised himself with the region, and his concept of the war with Paraguay was essentially that of a triumphant, unopposed march across the region by Bolivian troops.
