= Boyuibe =

Coordinates: 20°25′55″S 63°16′55″W

- Town
- Interactive map of Boyuibe
- Country: Bolivia
- Department: Santa Cruz Department
- Province: Cordillera Province
- Elevation: 2,661 ft (811 m)
- Time zone: UTC-4 (BOT)
- Climate: Cwa

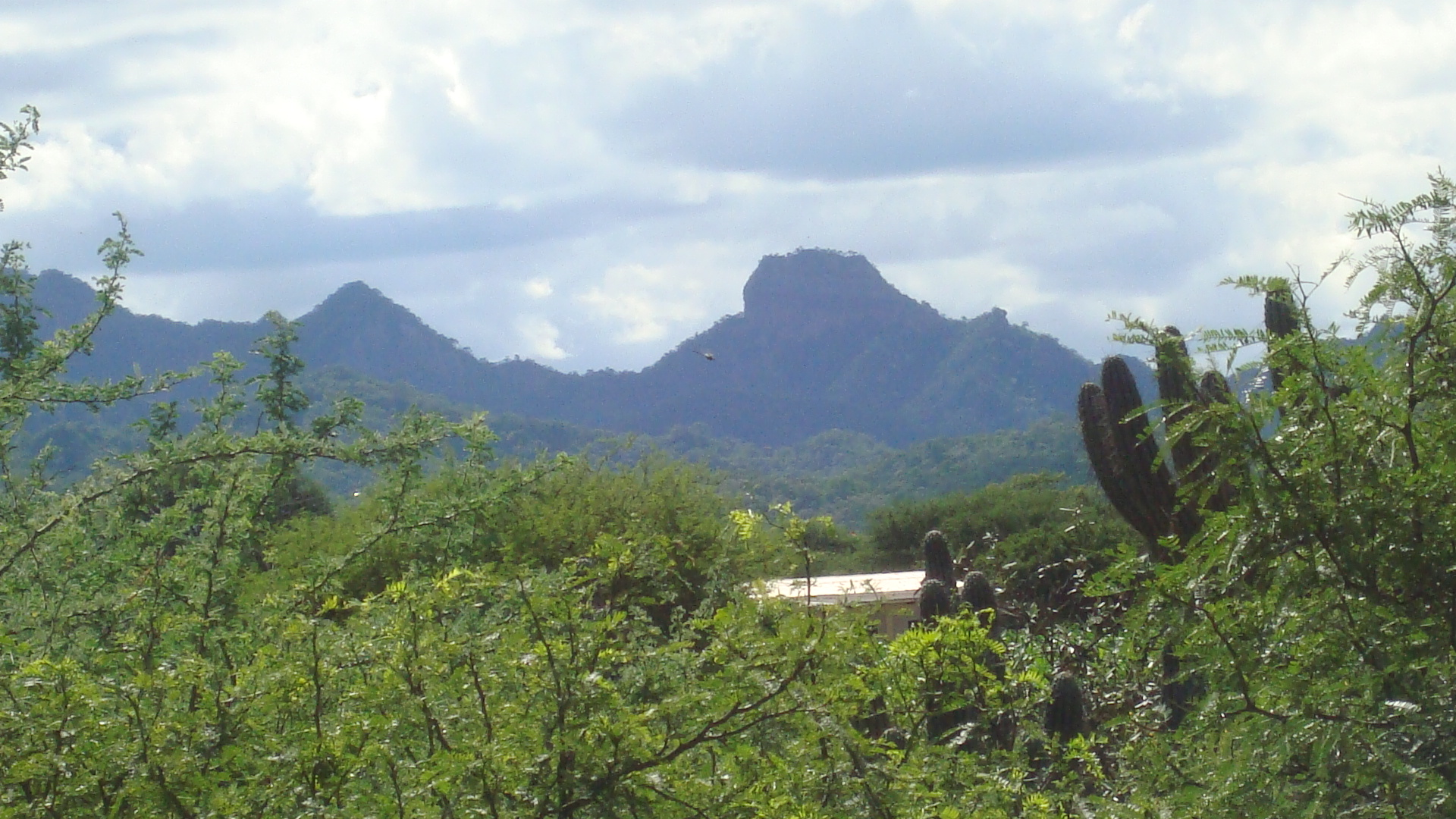
'Devil's tooth', Boyuibe

Boyuibe (de) is a town in southern Bolivia. In 2010 it had an estimated population of 3289.

== Geography and Climate ==
Boyuibe is in the South American Gran Chaco region, on the eastern edge of the Serranía del Aguaragüe mountains. The RN9, F6, and F36 roads meet in Boyuibe, as well as two rail lines.

It has a humid subtropical climate (Köppen: Cwa). The wet season is from November to April and the dry season is from May to October.
