= 2027 in Paraguay =

- Decades: 2000s; 2010s; 2020s; 2030s
- See also: Other events of 2027; Timeline of Paraguayan history

Events in the year 2027 in Paraguay.

== Events ==
=== Predicted and scheduled ===
- 6 February – Solar eclipse of February 6, 2027 (partial eclipse)

== Holidays ==
- 1 January – New Year's Day
- 1 March – National Heroes' Day
- 25 March – Maundy Thursday
- 26 March – Good Friday
- 1 May – Labour Day
- 14 May – Independence Day
- 12 June – Chaco Armistice Day
- 15 August – Founding of Asunción
- 29 September – Boqueron Battle Victory Day Holiday
- 8 December – Virgin of Caacupé Day
- 25 December – Christmas Day
