= 1933 in Paraguay =

- Decades: 1910s; 1920s; 1930s; 1940s; 1950s
- See also: Other events of 1933; Timeline of Paraguayan history

The following lists events that happened during 1933 in the Republic of Paraguay.

== Incumbents ==
- President: Eusebio Ayala
- Vice President: Raúl Casal Ribeiro

== Events ==
- January 20–26 - First Battle of Nanawa
- February - Battle of Campo Jordán
- February–March - Battle of Toledo
- July 4 - Second Battle of Nanawa
- August 30–September 15 - Battle of Campo Grande
- November–December - Campo Vía pocket

== See also ==
- Chaco War
