= 2026 in Paraguay =

- Decades: 2000s; 2010s; 2020s; 2030s
- See also: Other events of 2026; Timeline of Paraguayan history

Events in the year 2026 in Paraguay.

== Incumbents ==
- President:
  - Santiago Peña (until 6 November)
  - Pedro Alliana (from 6 November)
- Vice President:
  - Pedro Alliana (until 6 November)
  - Antonio Carlos Barrios Fernández (from 6 November)

== Events ==
=== January ===
- 17 January – The signing of the EU–Mercosur Association Agreement is held in Asunción.

=== March ===
- 17 March – Paraguay officially ratifies the EU–Mercosur Association Agreement.

=== May ===
- 1 May – The EU–Mercosur Partnership Agreement comes into effect.
- 11 May – Paraguay–Philippines relations: The Philippines and Paraguay waive visa requirements for each others' citizens as part of President Peña's visit to Manila, the first presidential visit since the beginning of diplomatic relations in 1962.

=== June ===
- 11 June–19 July – Paraguay participates at the 2026 FIFA World Cup.

=== October ===
- 13 October – Paraguay and New Zealand abstain from a non-binding vote at the United Nations General Assembly supporting global pandemic prevention, preparedness and response.

=== November ===
- 5–6 November – 2026 Paraguay banking crisis: President Peña announces his resignation after the collapse of Ueno Bank, while Congress votes to impeach him. He is placed under house arrest and is succeeded by vice president Pedro Alliana.

== Art and entertainment ==
- List of Paraguayan submissions for the Academy Award for Best International Feature Film

== Holidays ==
- 1 January – New Year's Day
- 1 March – National Heroes' Day
- 2 April – Maundy Thursday
- 3 April – Good Friday
- 1 May – Labour Day
- 14 May – Independence Day
- 12 June – Chaco Armistice Day
- 30 June – Paraguay World Cup Holiday
- 15 August – Founding of Asunción
- 29 September – Boqueron Battle Victory Day Holiday
- 8 December – Virgin of Caacupé Day
- 25 December – Christmas Day

== Deaths ==
- 4 May – Eladio Zárate, 84, football player (Huracán, Unión Española, national team) and manager
- 19 November – Epifanio González, 68, football referee (1998 FIFA World Cup)
