= 2024 in Paraguay =

- Decades: 2000s; 2010s; 2020s; 2030s
- See also: Other events of 2024; Timeline of Paraguayan history

Events in the year 2024 in Paraguay.

== Incumbents ==
- President: Santiago Peña
- Vice President: Pedro Alliana

== Events ==
=== February ===
- Allies of former President Horacio Cartes in the Senate expel opposition Senator Kattya González over alleged administrative misconduct, prompting protests in Asunción.

=== April ===
- 20 April – Heavy rains triggers flooding in Ñeembucú, Central, Misiones, Presidente Hayes, and Cordillera, killing four people are killed and displacing 10,000.

=== July ===
- 16 July – Police seize over four tons of cocaine worth $240 million at a river port in Asunción, the largest cocaine seizure in the country's history.

=== August ===
- 6 August – The United States imposes sanctions on the cigarette manufacturer Tabacalera del Este and four other firms for supporting the illicit enrichment of former president Horacio Cartes.
- 8 August – Paraguay orders the expulsion of US ambassador Marc Ostfield in protest over the imposition of sanctions against Tabacalera del Este on 6 August.
- 19 August – National Deputy Eulalio "Lalo" Gomes is killed in his residence in Pedro Juan Caballero during a shootout with police executing a narcotrafficking and money-laundering investigation involving his son, who later surrenders.

=== November ===
- 15 November – President Peña enacts the “anti-NGO law,” allowing the government to shut down NGOs that fail reporting rules, while exempting faith groups, parties, and football clubs.

=== December ===
- 5 December – Paraguay expels a Chinese diplomat who called for legislators to recognize Beijing in a surprise visit to Congress.
- 12 December – Paraguay moves its embassy in Israel to Jerusalem for the second time since relocating it to Tel Aviv in 2018.

== Art and entertainment ==
- List of 2024 box office number-one films in Paraguay
- List of Paraguayan submissions for the Academy Award for Best International Feature Film

== Holidays ==
- 1 January – New Year's Day
- 1 March – National Heroes' Day
- 28 March – Maundy Thursday
- 29 March – Good Friday
- 1 May – Labour Day
- 14 May – Independence Day
- 15 June – Chaco Armistice Day
- 15 August – Founding of Asunción
- 29 September – Boqueron Battle Victory Day Holiday
- 8 December – Virgin of Caacupé Day
- 25 December – Christmas Day

== Deaths ==
- 2 February – Osvaldo Domínguez Dibb, 83, football executive, president of Club Olimpia (1974–1990, 1995–2004).
- 3 February – Charles González Palisa, 82, Argentine-born Paraguayan television show host.
- 30 March – Martín Almada, 87, lawyer and human rights activist (Archives of Terror).
- 2 May – Tito Steiner, 72, Paraguayan-Argentine Olympic decathlete (1976).
- 18 May – Agustín Ramón Martínez, 62, Israeli-Paraguayan serial killer and fraudster.
- 19 August – Lalo Gomes, 68, Brazilian-born politician, deputy (since 2023).
- 27 September – Fabián Caballero, 46, Argentine-Paraguayan football player (Dundee, Club Nacional) and manager (Sportivo Ameliano).
- 1 October – Zenón Franco Ocampos, 68, chess grandmaster.

== See also ==
- Bibliography of Paraguay
- Outline of Paraguay
