= Battle of Kilometer 7 =

1932–33 battle of the Chaco War

Battle of Kilometer 7 (Batalla de Kilómetro 7)
- Part of the Chaco War
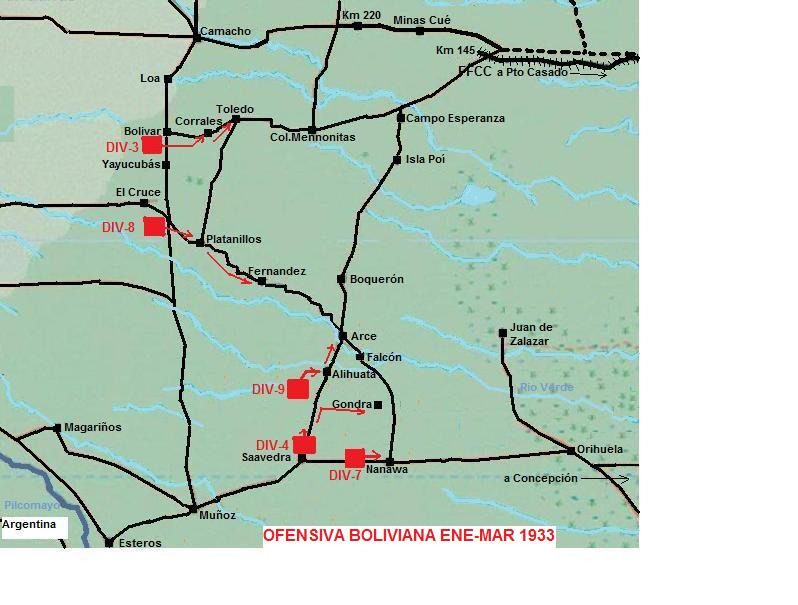
- Bolivian offensive, early 1933
| Date | 7 November 1932 – February 1933 |
| Location | Gran Chaco 23.419444°S 60.013889°W |
| Result | Bolivian victory |

Belligerents
| Republic of Bolivia | Republic of Paraguay |

Commanders and leaders
| Bernardino Bilbao Rioja | José Félix Estigarribia |

Strength
| 1,200 (November 1932) 3,000 (February 1933) | 900 (November 1932) 15,000 (December 1932) 3,000 (February 1933) |
- Location within Paraguay Battle of Kilometer 7 (South America) Battle of Kilometer 7 (America)

The Battle of Kilometer 7 was a series of clashes during the Chaco War between Bolivian and Paraguayan forces from 7 November 1932 to February 1933, and ended with a Paraguayan retreat to the northeast towards Gondra, later to be the site of the Battle of Campo Jordán. The Paraguayan initiative, which had belonged to the Paraguayans since the beginning of the siege of Boquerón passed to the Bolivian army until the Second Battle of Nanawa in July.
