= 2025 in Paraguay =

- Decades: 2000s; 2010s; 2020s; 2030s
- See also: Other events of 2025; Timeline of Paraguayan history

Events in the year 2025 in Paraguay.

== Incumbents ==
- President: Santiago Peña
- Vice President: Pedro Alliana

== Events ==
=== January ===
- 6 January — Venezuela breaks off diplomatic relations with Paraguay after President Santiago Peña recognizes Edmundo González Urrutia as president-elect of Venezuela.

=== March ===
- 26 March – The Brazilian government admits that the Brazilian Intelligence Agency had conducted espionage on Paraguayan officials during the presidency of Jair Bolsonaro.

=== April ===
- 1 April – Paraguay recalls its ambassador to Brazil and suspends negotiations over the management of the Itaipu Dam in retaliation for discovery of Brazilian espionage activities against the country.

=== August ===
- 9–23 August – The 2025 Junior Pan American Games are held in Asunción.
- 28–31 August – The 2025 Rally del Paraguay is held in the Encarnación area.

=== September ===
- 4 September – Paraguay qualifies for the FIFA World Cup for the first time since 2010 after drawing with Ecuador 0–0 at the 2026 FIFA World Cup qualification at the Estadio Defensores del Chaco in Asunción, prompting President Peña to declare a national holiday for the next day.
- 14 September – Mexican politician Hernán Bermúdez Requena is arrested in Paraguay on charges of leading the La Barredora cartel.
- 16 September – Paraguay, as a member of Mercosur, signs a free trade agreement with Iceland, Liechtenstein, Norway and Switzerland.

=== December ===
- 26 December – Silvinei Vasques, a former commander of the Brazilian Federal Highway Police wanted for evading his conviction on charges of involvement in the 8 January Brasília attacks in 2023, is arrested at Silvio Pettirossi International Airport in Asunción and extradited to Brazil.

== Art and entertainment ==
- List of Paraguayan submissions for the Academy Award for Best International Feature Film

== Holidays ==
- 1 January – New Year's Day
- 1 March – National Heroes' Day
- 17 April – Maundy Thursday
- 18 April – Good Friday
- 1 May – Labour Day
- 14 May – Independence Day
- 12 June – Chaco Armistice Day
- 15 August – Founding of Asunción
- 29 September – Boqueron Battle Victory Day Holiday
- 8 December – Virgin of Caacupé Day
- 25 December – Christmas Day

== Deaths ==
- 4 August – Derlis Rodríguez, 45, deputy (since 2023)
- 23 August – Ausberto Rodríguez Jara, 83, journalist

== See also ==
- Bibliography of Paraguay
- Outline of Paraguay
