= 2018 in Paraguay =

- Decades: 1990s; 2000s; 2010s; 2020s; 2030s
- See also: Other events of 2018; Timeline of Paraguayan history

Events in the year 2018 in Paraguay.

== Incumbents ==
- President: Horacio Cartes (until 15 August): Mario Abdo Benítez (from 15 August)
- Vice President:
  - until 11 April: Juan Afara
  - 11 April-9 May: Vacant
  - 9 May-15 August: Alicia Pucheta
  - starting 15 August: Hugo Velázquez Moreno

== Events ==
- 22 April – the 2018 Paraguayan general election.
- 15 August – Mario Abdo Benítez took over as the new president of Paraguay.

== Deaths ==
- 19 June – Efrén Echeverría, musician (b. 1932).
