= Ernesto Pérez Acosta =

Salesian priest (1889–1977)

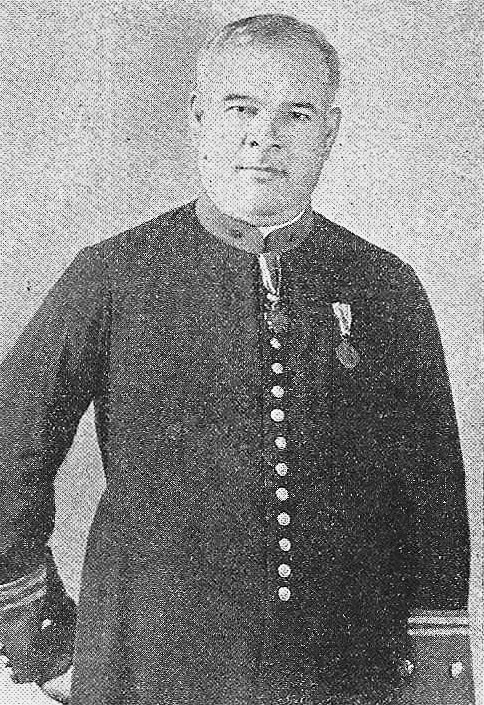

Personal life
- Born: January 17, 1889 Itauguá, Paraguay
- Died: April 28, 1977 (aged 88)

Religious life
- Religion: Roman Catholic

Ernesto Perez Acosta was a Paraguayan Salesian priest. He was a chaplain in the Chaco War.

== Biography ==
=== Youth and studies ===
Ernesto Pérez Acosta, popularly known as "Pai Pérez" [Father Pérez] was born in Itauguá, in Paraguay's Central Department on January 17, 1889, to Colonel José del Carmen Pérez, one of the members of the 1870 constitutional assembly, and Juana Rosa Acosta.

He joined the school of the Church of Encarnación in the capital, Asunción. In 1901 he met with the Salesians for the first time to register as a student at the Monsignor Lasagna School. In 1903, he traveled to Uruguay to begin his studies at the Seminary of Manga, near Montevideo. He was ordained a priest in 1916, and celebrated his first Mass in Asunción in the new chapel of his former school.

=== Priesthood ===
In his first year of priesthood he created a troop of boy scouts named Don Bosco. This contingent, under his spiritual direction, toured large parts of the country on foot. He began his work of educating young Paraguayans, an activity which he developed for nearly six decades. In 1938, he was appointed vice president of the Paraguayan Federation of Scouting. Later on his life he would also found a troop named Rojas Silva, after a Paraguayan Army lieutenant who had died in the border conflict predating the Chaco War with Bolivia; this troop, as it marched across the countryside, usually was accompanied by a band.

The figure of Father Pérez soon acquired notoriety; his appealing and educated personality, his affable treatment, and firm discipline gave him prestige and popularity. In 1927 he was appointed director of the Salesian College of the Sacred Heart and, the following year, councilor of the city of Asunción.

=== Experience in the Chaco War ===
In 1930 he was director of the Institute of San José Concepción. At the outbreak of the Chaco War in 1932, he accompanied the army, amongst many of his students into the Chaco. Appointed chaplain, he became famous for his participation in the defense of Fort Nanawa, one of the war's main battles, where he fought alongside the soldiers as an infantryman. He became friends with the overall commander of the fort, Luis Irrazábal, and soon was made head chaplain for the Paraguayan III Corps. On 11 December 1934, he received the Chaco Cross for his bravery; he eventually was also awarded the Cross of the Defender. He published a book on his experiences during the war, and by the end of it was a colonel in the Army.

=== Later years ===
In 1952, he was named dean of the Don Bosco College in Villarrica, and in 1958, dean of the School of Agriculture and Husbandry in Coronel Oviedo.

He died on April 28, 1977.

Since 1960, a street in Pettirossi in the capital bears his name.
