= 2022 in Paraguay =

- Decades: 2000s; 2010s; 2020s; 2030s
- See also: Other events of 2022; Timeline of Paraguayan history

Events in the year 2022 in Paraguay.

== Incumbents ==
- President: Mario Abdo Benítez
- Vice President: Hugo Velázquez Moreno

== Events ==
- 2 March – Paraguay voted on a United Nations resolution condemning Russia for its invasion of Ukraine.
- 23 October – Osvaldo Villalba, a leader of the Marxist–Leninist Paraguayan People's Army rebel group, is killed alongside two other militants during a gunfight with soldiers in Amambay, Paraguay.

== Deaths ==
- 10 May – Marcelo Pecci, 45, prosecutor, shot.
- 31 July – Zulma Gómez, 61, politician, senator (since 2008) and deputy (2003–2008), drowned.
