= Nicolás Ern =

- Born: Nikolai Frantsevich Ern; 18 December 1879; Tiflis, Russian Empire
- Died: 19 July 1972 (aged 91); Asunción, Republic of Paraguay
- Education: Nicholas General Staff Academy
- Military career
- Allegiance: Russian Empire; White Movement; Republic of Paraguay
- Branch: Imperial Russian Army; White Movement; Paraguayan Army
- Rank: Major-General
- Unit: 18th Dragoon Seversky Regiment
- Conflicts: First World War; Russian Civil War; Chaco War

Nicolás Ern (Russian: Никола́й Фра́нцевич Эрн; 18 December 1879 – 19 July 1972) was a Russian and Paraguayan military officer with the rank of general.

== Biography ==
Nicolás Ern was born Nikolai Frantsevich Ern in Tiflis, Russian Empire (today Tbilisi, Georgia) to Franz Karlovich Ern, of Swedish-German origin, and Olga Pavlovna Rayskaya, who was half-Polish, half-Russian. He was the brother of the philosopher Vladimir Ern.

In 1906 he graduated from the Nicholas General Staff Academy. At the start of World War I he became a staff officer in the 4th Corps of the Caucasus Army. In 1915 he had the rank of colonel and was chief of staff of the 1st Caucasus Cossack Division, and then chief of staff of the 1st Caucasian Cavalry Corps in the Persian campaign. In 1916 he commanded the 18th Dragoon Seversky Regiment, and in 1917 attained the rank of major general.

In the Russian Civil War, he fought on the side of the White Russian forces in the Volunteer Army and the Armed Forces of South Russia. After the White Russians evacuated Crimea, he spent a few years teaching military history in Bela Crkva, Kingdom of Yugoslavia.

=== Paraguayan career ===
In 1924, Ern emigrated to Paraguay. He taught at the military academy, and later took part in the Chaco War against Bolivia. He held the rank of lieutenant general in the Paraguayan army.

In the Chaco War he helped organize the defense of Nanawa alongside fellow Russian émigré general Juan Belaieff. He is also credited with helping to decipher Bolivian military codes.

=== Later life and legacy ===
During the Korean War, he helped recruit Russian emigrants for the US Army.

Some of his papers from the Persian campaign are in the collection of Columbia University archives. He died in Asunción on 19 July 1972, aged 92.
