= 2020 in Paraguay =

- Decades: 2000s; 2010s; 2020s; 2030s
- See also: Other events of 2020; Timeline of Paraguayan history

Events in the year 2020 in Paraguay.

== Incumbents ==
- President: Mario Abdo Benítez
- Vice President: Hugo Velázquez Moreno

== Events ==
- 11 September – Former vice-president Óscar Denis is kidnapped by rebels.
- 18 September – Authorities fear for the health of Denis, 74, after the indigenous man who was captured with him but then released tests positive for COVID-19.
- COVID-19 pandemic in Paraguay

== Deaths ==
- January 6 – Zacarías Ortiz Rolón, Roman Catholic bishop (b. 1934).
- January 7 – Ana Lucrecia Taglioretti, violinist (b. 1995).
- January 31 – César Zabala, 58, footballer (Cerro Porteño, Talleres, national team), bladder cancer.
