= First Battle of Nanawa =

1933 battle of the Chaco War

- Part of the Chaco War
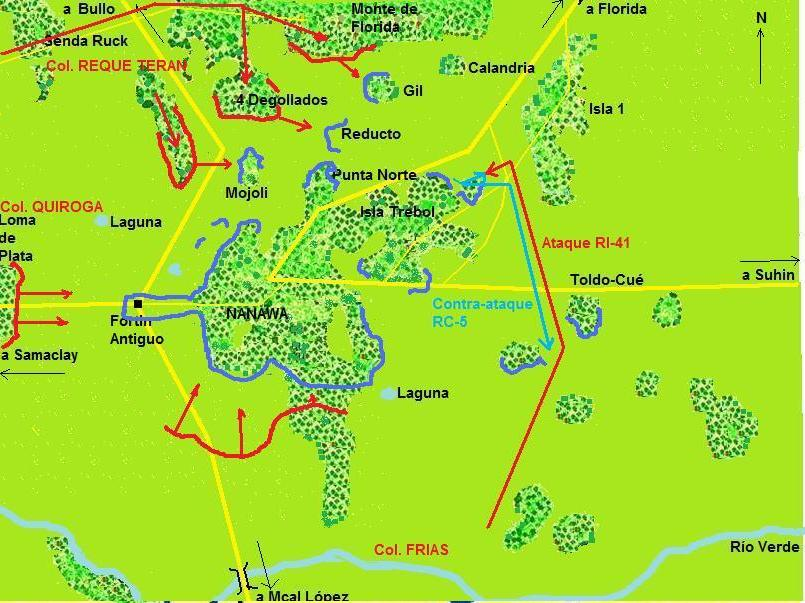
- Sketch of the first battle of Nanawa
Date	20–26 January 1933
Location	Gran Chaco 23°29′15″S 59°46′09″W
Result	Paraguayan victory

Belligerents
Bolivia	Paraguay

Commanders and leaders
(Bolivia) Hans Kundt	(Paraguay) Luis Irrazábal

Units involved
(Bolivia) 4th Division (Bolivia) 9th Division	(Paraguay) 5th Division

Strength
9,000	2,500

Casualties and losses
2,000 killed	248 killed
- Location within Paraguay First Battle of Nanawa (South America) First Battle of Nanawa (America)

The First Battle of Nanawa was fought from 20 to 26 January 1933 between the Bolivian and Paraguayan armies during the Chaco War. Nanawa (Enxet for "carob tree forest"), established by the Paraguayans in 1928, was considered the strongest Paraguayan outpost after it was heavily fortified by the end of 1932 under directives of Ivan Belaieff and Nicolas Ern, two White Russian former officers who joined the Paraguayan army in the 1920s. Zig-zag trenches, barbed wire and machine gun nests were built by the garrison around a horseshoe-shaped defence. Nanawa's commander, Col. Luis Irrazábal, summoned under his command four regiments and several minor units which made up the Paraguayan fifth division. The commander-in-chief of the Bolivian army, German World War I veteran Hans Kundt, commanded the Bolivian assault personally in place. The Bolivian army launched three attacks that stalled after seizing some parts of the stronghold. After this failure, the Bolivian troops attempted to dig a trench around the Nanawa complex to isolate it but were met by Paraguayan reinforcements. Heavy rains forced the Bolivians to abandon what they had captured of the complex and the Paraguayans soon recovered these positions.

The Bolivian troops did not leave the area after the costly attempt but fortified themselves in a semicircle around the Paraguayan trenches. In July during the dry season the Bolivian army attempted again to capture Nanawa in the Second Battle of Nanawa.

Together with the second battle of Nanawa, fought seven month later, it was one of the bloodiest battles fought in South America in the 20th century, coming to be labeled as the "South American Verdun" by comparison with the Battle of Verdun of World War I.

A Paraguayan polka, Regimiento 13 Tuyutí, composed by Ramón Vargas Colman and written in Guaraní by Emiliano R. Fernández, was inspired by the battle. Fernández, a poet, was at the time a soldier of the Paraguayan fifth division, and was wounded during the Bolivian assault.

== Sources ==
- Latin America's Wars: The age of the professional soldier, 1900–2001. Robert L. Scheina. Page 97.
