= Neneco Norton =

- Also known as: Neneco
- Born: Elio Ramón González; December 8, 1923; Asunción, Paraguay
- Origin: Paraguay
- Died: 9 March 2013 (aged 89)
- Occupations: Musician, composer, orchestra director

Neneco Norton (born Elio Ramon González; December 8, 1923 – March 9, 2013) was a Paraguayan musician, composer and orchestra director.

== Early life and career ==
Norton was born on December 8, 1923, in Asunción, Paraguay. His parents were Apolonio Benitez and Hermelinda González. Neneco got his start in music when he played trumpet in the battalion band of the Rojas Silva battalion of Salesianito, a private school in Asunción. His lessons in elementary music theory were taken with Ernesto Pérez Acosta. He learned theory and higher sight-reading with maestro Jose de Jesus Villalba, and then studied harmony with Professor Otakar Platill.

While in the Rojas Silva battalion, he formed a musical group. Its members included Luis Meza Osmer, Rubito Medina on guitar, Benjamin Cabañas on clarinet, and a singer who later would be famous: Luis Alberto del Paraná.

Norton was awarded the title of senior professor of theory and music theory at the Jorge Baez Conservatory. He formed his own orchestra, Los Caballeros del Ritmo, a remarkable grouping comprising Rudy Heyn, Chon Duarte, Paco Gomez, Victorio Ortiz and Nelson Mendoza. The band went on tour throughout Paraguay, as well as to cities in Argentina, Brazil, and Uruguay.

== Song writing career ==
Norton has written more than eighty compositions. The guarania "Aquel Ayer," a renowned work, marked his first experience in the field of composition and was recorded by Luis Alberto del Paraná, who catapulted it to success. He is the author of one of the most well known Paraguayan songs, "Paloma Blanca" (The White Dove). This song has been recorded by countless national and international performers, including Julio Iglesias. This success was joined by numerous compositions throughout his long career as a composer, conductor, and orchestral arranger. Other highlights include "Buscándote" and "Tus Ojos". The song "Yo vì un Amanecer," with lyrics by journalist Humberto Rubin and with the voice of Niño Pereira, represented Paraguay in the Third World Song Festival held in Rio de Janeiro.

Singers such as Luis Alberto del Parana, Agustín Barboza, Pura Agüero Vera, Ñeco Gonzalez, and Oscar Barreto Aguayo sought the direction and orchestral arrangements of Norton for making records and for live presentations on television, radio, and in theaters.

Singers such as Luis Alberto del Paraná, Samuel Aguayo, Hannibal Lovera, Ramona Galarza, and Julio Iglesias; and groups such as Indios, Alberto y Los Trios Paraguayos, Los Gomez, and Los Tres Sudamericanos (Paraguayan); as well as Herminio Giménez, Florentín Giménez, Luis Bordón, and Bernardo Avalos have recorded compositions by Neneco Norton.

== Compositions for the stage ==
In addition to writing songs, Neneco was devoted to compose musical works for the local theater, called Paraguayan Zarzuela.

He collaborated with Paraguayan playwright and journalist Alcibiades González Delvalle to create works such as Reseda, Naranjera, Ribereña, The Arribeños, La Morena, Del Trigal, El Delegado and Cañaveral. Neneco also worked with playwright Mario Halley Mora in La Promesera of Caacupé and Mustafa. With Críspulo Melgarejo he shared the authorship of Marido de Contrabando, El Gringo de la Loma and Escuela Pyhare. Librettist Rogelio Silverado was another creative companion of Neneco Norton. Their collaborations included the play La Candeladria de mi Barrio.

== Final years and Death ==
Despite his age, in his final years Neneco Norton served as professor of Paraguayan popular folk music at the National Conservatory of Music and as a teacher in the school of Villa Elisa, Maria Auxiliadora School. He was an active member of the steering committee for the Autores Paraguayos Asociados (APA), and taught composition and the structure of Paraguayan music.

He died on March 9, 2013, at the age of 89 after being hospitalized for 2 months due to pneumonia complications.

== Awards ==
The Municipality of Asunción gave Norton Neneco the distinction of beloved son of the capital city of Asunción, because the city was one of the great inspirations for his work.
