= Charles González Palisa =

Paraguayan radio and television presenter (1942–2024)

- Born: 23 January 1942; Buenos Aires, Argentina
- Died: 3 February 2024 (aged 82); Asunción, Paraguay
- Occupations: Radio and television presenter
- Spouse: Stella López Mena
- Children: 3

Charles González Palisa (23 January 1942 – 3 February 2024) was a Paraguayan radio and television presenter, recognized for his participation in benefit programs organized by the then APADEM-Teletón Foundation. At the same time, he ventured into stage acting and later into politics.

== Early life ==
The son of José González Guillén, of French nationality, and Margarita Palisa, Charles González Palisa was born in Buenos Aires on 23 January 1942. His father had been a representative of Aeroposta Argentina in Paraguay, and when he was barely 7 days old, González moved to this country where he lived the rest of his life.

== Career ==
González's beginnings as a presenter occurred on radio Ñandutí. His career continued on Chaco Boreal radio, with the program Caravana in its radio version and which he would later bring to television in 1967. He also stood out in hosting Differente on Cardinal FM, a radio program where he popularized the poem En vida, hermano, en vida, written by Mexican writer Ana María Rabatté. He also worked at the Emisoras Paraguay radio station, where he obtained the "Golden Microphone". His participation in television programs such as Caravana on Canal 9, a cycle that he hosted for 10 years, and Folklore de gala, as well as his collaboration in Teletón and in different folklore festivals, led him to transcend at a national level.

== Other work ==
On the acting level, González starred in the first Paraguayan fotonovela and acted in three plays alongside Neneco Norton, Florentín Giménez and Juan Carlos Moreno González; and in zarzuelas, such as Raida Poty by Juan Manuel Frutos Pane. He also recorded albums containing poems. He also ventured into politics, running as a candidate for national deputy for the Youth Party for the 2018 general elections. Later he ran as a councilor of Asunción representing the same political party. In both cases he failed to obtain the votes necessary to enter the positions.

González acknowledged, in an interview with the newspaper Crónica, that he received a pension benefit from Argentina. Given that he had worked at Aerolíneas Argentinas and the fact that he had contributed to the system, in 2006, he was able to access the moratorium implemented during the Néstor Kirchner government, a benefit that reached around 2 million people, some irregularly.

== Personal life and death ==
González and his wife, Stella López Mena, had three children and six grandchildren, which made up his family circle. After undergoing heart surgery at a sanatorium in Asunción, he died on 3 February 2024, at the age of 82.

== Awards and honors ==
In 2016, González was named “Dear Son of Asunción” by the Municipal Board of that city. He was also awarded the “Golden Microphone” on different occasions.
