= 2019 in Paraguay =

- Decades: 1990s; 2000s; 2010s; 2020s; 2030s
- See also: Other events of 2019; Timeline of Paraguayan history

Events in the year 2019 in Paraguay.

== Incumbents ==
- President: Mario Abdo Benítez
- Vice President: Hugo Velázquez Moreno

== Events ==
=== Sports ===
- 21 November to 1 December (scheduled) – Paraguay will host the 2019 FIFA Beach Soccer World Cup, to be held in the city of Asunción

=== Flooding ===
Paraguay was inundated by frequent heavy rains that started at the end of April. Tens of thousands of people were affected, and at least six people died.

== Deaths ==
- 17 March – Víctor Genes, footballer (b. 1961).
- 27 March – Jan Kobylański, union leader and stamp printer (b. 1923).
- 7 April – Luis Fernando Páez, footballer (b. 1989).
