= 1932 in Paraguay =

- Decades: 1910s; 1920s; 1930s; 1940s; 1950s
- See also: Other events of 1932; Timeline of Paraguayan history

The following lists events that happened during 1932 in the Republic of Paraguay.

== Incumbents ==
- President: Emiliano González Navero until January 28 (acting), José Patricio Guggiari until August 25, Eusebio Ayala
- Vice President: Emiliano González Navero

== Events ==
- September 7–29 – The Battle of Boquerón, the first major battle of the Chaco War, ends with victory for Paraguay.
