= 2016 in Paraguay =

- Decades: 1990s; 2000s; 2010s; 2020s; 2030s
- See also: Other events of 2016; Timeline of Paraguayan history

Events in the year 2016 in Paraguay.

== Incumbents ==
- President: Horacio Cartes

== Events ==
- 1 October – the Miss Universo Paraguay 2016 pageant

=== Sport ===
- 5-21 August – Paraguay at the 2016 Summer Olympics: 11 competitors in 7 sports

== Deaths ==
- 8 January – Carlos Milcíades Villalba Aquino, Roman Catholic bishop (b. 1924).
- 23 January – Pablo Contessi, physician and politician.
- 29 March – Oscar Páez Garcete, Roman Catholic bishop (b. 1937).
