= 2023 in Paraguay =

- Decades: 2000s; 2010s; 2020s; 2030s
- See also: Other events of 2023; Timeline of Paraguayan history

Events in the year 2023 in Paraguay.

== Incumbents ==
- President:
  - Mario Abdo Benítez (until 15 August)
  - Santiago Peña (from 15 August)
- Vice President:
  - Hugo Velázquez Moreno (until 15 August)
  - Pedro Alliana (from 15 August)

== Events ==
- 23 April: 2023 Paraguayan general election

== Deaths ==
- 6 January - Carlos Monín, 83, football player (Toulouse, Red Star, national team) and manager.
- 22 January - Darío Jara Saguier, 92, footballer (Rubio Ñu, Cerro Porteño, national team).
- 10 March - Juvencio Osorio, 72, footballer (Cerro Porteño, Espanyol, national team).
- 24 April - Alejandro Hamed, 89, diplomat and politician, minister of foreign affairs (2008–2009).
- 27 May -
  - Héctor Lacognata, 60, diplomat and politician, minister of foreign affairs (2009–2011).
  - Modesto Sandoval, 82, footballer (Sportivo Luqueño, Deportivo Galicia, Estudiantes).
- 22 August - Pastor Cuquejo, 83, Roman Catholic prelate, archbishop of Asunción (2002–2014).
- 8 October - Alcides Báez, 76, footballer (Libertad, Cerro Porteño, national team).
- 2 December - Walter Harms, 61, politician, deputy (since 2013).
- 23 December - Iván Almeida, 45, football player (Sportivo Patria) and manager (Sportivo Trinidense, Resistencia).
