= Battle of Toledo =

1933 battle of the Chaco War

- Part of the Chaco War
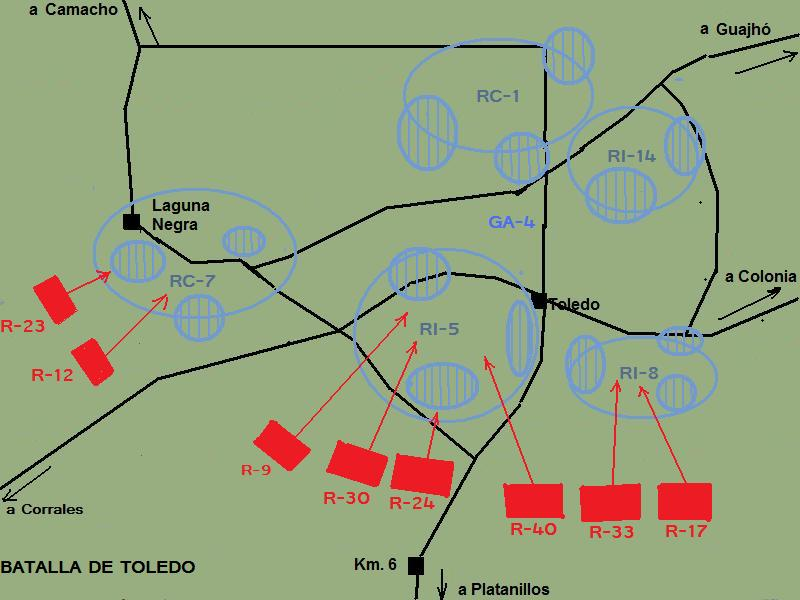
- Map of the battle
Date	25 February–10 March 1933
Location	Gran Chaco
Result	Paraguayan victory

Belligerents
Bolivia	Paraguay

Commanders and leaders
Hans Kundt; Filiberto Osorio; Luis Gamarra	José Félix Estigarribia; Juan Bautista Ayala

Units involved
3rd Division (8 Regiments)	2nd Corps (5 Regiments)

Strength
3625 men	5000 men

Casualties and losses
2000 casualties	200 casualties

The Battle of Toledo was fought amidst the Chaco War involving Bolivia and Paraguay between late February 1933 and 10 March of the same year. The Bolivian Army attacked a Paraguayan fortified position, Fort Toledo, and failed to take it, suffering heavy losses in the attempt.

== Background ==
General Hans Kundt, a World War I veteran and overall commander over Bolivian forces at the beginning of the Chaco War, would order the 3rd Division, under Colonel Gamarra, to march to an advance position near Fort Toledo, a Paraguayan position, 32 km away, which lay on the way to their headquarters at Isla Po'i. After some days where its troops rested and reconnoitered the Fort, they would start to attack it without support from other Bolivian units. This was not the first time the position had been fought over; the fort had been built by Paraguayan troops, taken by Bolivians and later recaptured.

The Paraguayan force in the region, the 2nd Corps, 5000 men strong, suffered from many problems. It was underequipped, had many fresh recruits, its artillery unit was equipped with old Krupp guns without sights, which would be discarded after the battle, and, finally, it had been struck down by dysentery and typhoid fever. Its only experienced and reliable units were Regiment no. 5 under Félix Cabrera, and the 3rd Artillery Group. The 1st Cavalry Regiment was defeated in battle previously and had had a long retreat towards Toledo; the 7th was badly armed and green; the 8th and 14th Infantry Regiments were mostly made out of recruits.

Lieutenant Colonel Ayala, their commander, recognizing that their conditions were unfavourable, decided to organize its position in "centres of resistance" (CRs), company-strong posts made of trenches and bunkers with large gaps between them, aided by Juan Belaieff. The fort then was a series of small fortifications in a semicircle from north to south.

== Engagement ==
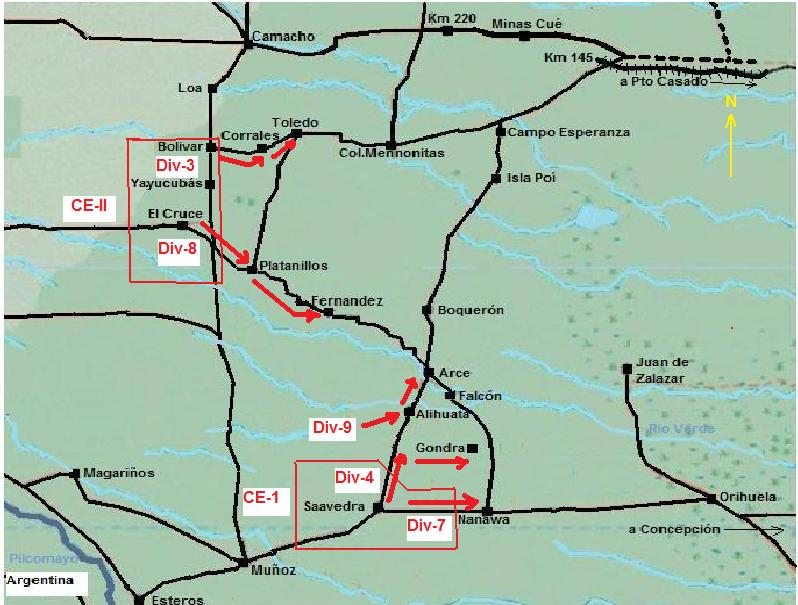
Bolivian advances in progress between January and March of 1933.

The Bolivian 3rd Division, 8 regiments strong, faced the 5 regiments of the Paraguayan 2nd Corps. Lack of gas for water trucks kept the Paraguayans from holding an advanced position, and they withdrew to the fort on 9 February. Some early engagements around 20 February built up the defenders' morale. On 25 February the attackers' artillery, which had only just arrived, began to fire at the fort; an air raid was also made at dawn. The attack itself was fruitless, with the Bolivian forces pinned down amongst the various CRs and suffering heavy losses from the crossfire.

On 27 February, the Bolivians once again tried to attack, but the result was similar, and, by the end of the day, had suffered circa 1200 casualties. Other attempts to attack at night or shell Paraguayan earthworks with artillery were similarly unsuccessful. On March 5 the Bolivian divisional commander was replaced, and a few days latter a report by the new commander, Lieutenant Colonel Quintela, was intercepted; in it, he listed his deplorable conditions to the regional commander Osorio. By this point, the Bolivian forces had lost nearly 2,000 men. With this intelligence, the Paraguayans launched an attack aiming for a double envelopment on March 10, forcing the Bolivians into a chaotic retreat, protected by thorny brush covering the area.

== Aftermath ==
The Bolivian forces managed to, in their majority, withdraw to a defensive line some tens of kilometers away, though incidents of insubordination and mutiny were rife. The lack of trucks on the Paraguayan side and a new malaria epidemic kept them from pursuing.

== Order of battle of the Paraguayan Army ==
The Paraguayan forces defending Fort Toledo were those of the II Corps, composed of two divisions and supporting units.

=== Headquarters ===
Commander – Lieutenant Colonel Juan B. Ayala

- Quartermaster – Major Sampson Harrison
- Head of the Health Services – Dr. Juan Boggino
- Interim Head of Staff - Captain Aparicio Núñez

=== 6th Infantry Division ===
Commander – Lieutenant Colonel Alfredo Mena

- Regiment no. 5 Gral. Díaz – Major Félix Cabrera
  - 1st Battalion - Major Hipólito Radice
  - 2nd Battalion - Captain Atílio Benítez
  - 3rd Battalion - Captain Mauricio Escobar
- Regiment no. 8 Piribebuy – Major Vicente Machuca
  - 1st Battalion - Captain Fructuoso Flores
  - 2nd Battalion - Captain José del Rosario Lezcano
  - 3rd Battalion - First Lieutenant Guido Chase Sardi
- Regiment no. 14 Cerro Corá - Major Eduardo García

=== 1st Cavalry Division ===
Commander – Lieutenant Colonel Manuel García de Zuñiga

- Cavalry Regiment no. 1 Valois Rivarola – Captain Alfredo Ramos
- Cavalry Regiment no. 7 San Martín - Major Sigifredo Melgarejo

=== Supporting units ===
- Artillery Group no. 3 Cnel. Hermosa - Captain Andrés Aguilera
- Artillery Group no. 4 Mayor Albertano Zayas - Major Pablo Sanabria
- Sappers Battalion - Captain Mamerto Torres
