= 2021 in Paraguay =

- Decades: 2000s; 2010s; 2020s; 2030s
- See also: Other events of 2021; Timeline of Paraguayan history

Events in the year 2021 in Paraguay.

== Incumbents ==
- President: Mario Abdo Benítez
- Vice President: Hugo Velázquez Moreno

== Events ==
- February 15 – 145,095 confirmed cases of COVID-19 and 2,953 deaths since the beginning of the pandemic.
- March 6 – President Benitez asks his entire cabinet to resign following conflicts between demonstrators and police at protests against the government’s handling of the COVID-19 pandemic. Rioters threw stones at police, who responded with rubber bullets and tear gas on March 5. More than 165,800 cases of COVID-19 have been reported, resulting in 3,200 deaths.
- March 12 – Andrés Gubetich, head of the Instituto de Previsión Social (IPS), resigns amidst scandal related to a lack of vaccines and overly-restrictive hospital admission requirements. Health Minister Julio Mazzoleni also resigns. Paraguay has reported 174,013 cases and 3,387 deaths from COVID-19, with the highest number of cases in Asunción.

== Deaths ==
- February 15 – José Pedrozo, 38, footballer (Antofagasta, San Marcos de Arica), traffic collision.
- March 11 – Florentín Giménez, 95, pianist and composer; COVID-19.
- April 6 – Rodolfo da Ponte, 82, Olympic fencer (1968).
- April 23 – Tiburcio González Rojas, 86, photographer
- May 15 – Nelly Reig Castellanos, 92, former first lady.

== See also ==
- COVID-19 in South America
- Lima Group
