= Battle of Campo Jordán =

1933 battle of the Chaco War

Battle of Campo Jordán (Batalla de Campo Jordán)
- Part of the Chaco War
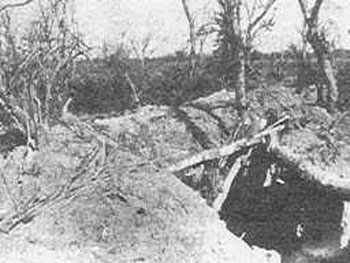
- Paraguayan trench
Date	March 1933
Location	Gran Chaco
Result	Bolivian victory

Belligerents
Republic of Bolivia	Republic of Paraguay

Commanders and leaders
(Bolivia) Enrique Peñaranda	(Paraguay) José Félix Estigarribia.

Strength
3,000	3,000

The Battle of Campo Jordán occurred during the Chaco War, with victory going to the Bolivians, who forced the Paraguayans to retreat towards Gondra, on losing Alihuatá and the supply route of the Saavedra-Alihuatá road.

== Background ==
The area was named after Bolivian Major German Jordan who had designed the defences used in the 1932 Battle of Boquerón and Battle of Kilometer 7. He had been killed while on patrol on 15 December 1932. Bolivian General Hans Kundt ordered an offensive in the area to threaten the Paraguayan forces at Fort Alihuatá. Operations began on 1 March 1933.

== Battle ==
The Bolivians attacked to the rear of the 1st Paraguayan Division, at a point around the 12 kilometer mark on the Alihuatá-Saavedra road. The Paraguayan divisional commander, Colonel Fernandez, had been made aware of the offensive from Bolivian prisoners of war and the clash caused him, on 11 March, to request authorisation to withdraw from Alihuatá from his superior Colonel Estigarribia.

On 12 March a squadron of the Bolivian Lanza Regiment commanded by Major Eduardo again threatened the rear of the Paraguayan forces, but was forced to withdraw with Eduardo being wounded in action. The 4th Bolivian Division made attacks over the following days. On 14 March Estigarribia ordered Fernandez to continue to hold his ground until the 20 March as Estigarribia intended to reinforce Alihuatá. Fernandez considered this impossible and, after a meeting with his regimental commanders on 15 March, authorised a withdrawal at 11pm on 16 March. The withdrawal began in the afternoon of 17 March and saw the 1st Division pull back to Gondra and abandon Alihuatá.

== Aftermath ==
The withdrawal was the first made by Paraguayan forces in the seven months of the war. Despite fears of losing much of his heavy equipment Fernandez's men made a successful retreat, pulling the artillery themselves, and lost only 60 boxes of rifle ammunition that was buried. A Chilean colonel, Vergara Vicuna, serving with the Bolivians praised the withdrawal as a success with Bolivian forces not noticing the Paraguayan retreat until 18 March.
