= Lalo Gomes =

Paraguayan politician (1956–2024)

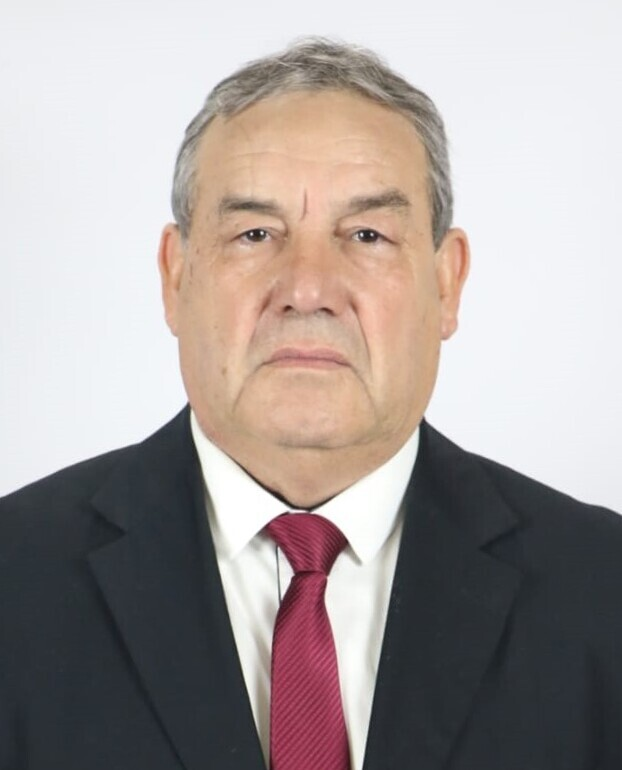
- Official portrait, 2023

Deputy of Paraguay
- In office 30 June 2023 – 19 August 2024
- Constituency: Amambay

Personal details
- Born: Eulalio Gomes Batista; 25 January 1956 Ponta Porã, Mato Grosso do Sul, Brazil
- Died: 19 August 2024 (aged 68) Pedro Juan Caballero, Amambay Department, Paraguay
- Party: Colorado
- Spouse: Joana Izabel Rodrigues
- Children: 4
- Occupation: Politician; Businessman

Eulalio "Lalo" Gomes Batista (25 January 1956 – 19 August 2024) was a Brazilian-born Paraguayan politician and businessman. He served as a deputy of Paraguay from 2023 to 2024, when he was shot dead by police during a raid on his home after an indictment was filed against him for money laundering linked to drug trafficking.

== Business and political career ==
=== Early years ===
Before entering politics, Gomes worked as manager of Banco Paraná in Brazil and of Banco Amambay (now Banco Basa), which belonged to the family of Horacio Cartes, according to Gomes's sister.

Gomes first entered politics in the Regional Office in the Department of Amambay of the Asociación Rural de Paraguay (ARP, "Rural Association of Paraguay"), of which he was president for several years. His grandfather and father were also dedicated to livestock.

Gomes stood as a candidate for deputy for the Colorado Party, initially being a member of the internal movement Fuerza Republicana, which initially had then-incumbent Vice President Hugo Velázquez as its presidential candidate, and after Velázquez declined, Gomes continued to support his replacement, Arnoldo Wiens. After Gomes's candidacy was confirmed in the Colorado Party primaries, he moved to the Honor Colorado movement. On his social media profiles he appeared repeatedly with the movement's presidential candidate (and eventual president of Paraguay) Santiago Peña during the electoral campaign and, at the same time, he boasted of repeated meetings with former employer Horacio Cartes, who by then was a former president of Paraguay and was the incumbent president of the Colorado Party; one of Gomes' last public appearances was visiting Cartes at his home after Tabacalera del Este S. A. (TABESA) was sanctioned by the United States for financially supporting Cartes, whom the United States designated as "significantly corrupt."

=== National Deputy of Paraguay ===
In the 2023 Paraguayan general election, Gomes was elected deputy in the 72nd place of 80 available seats. In the same elections, his sister Olga was elected as a departmental councilwoman and the Colorados regained power in Amambay with Juan Silvino Acosta as governor, who was reportedly close to Gomes, but said was unaware of the illegal activities attributed to him.

Like other legislators who are dedicated to livestock, Gomes defended the interests of the livestock sector, such as the creation of a Rural University of Paraguay in the Rural Association of Paraguay and the prohibition of the production of cultured meat grown in laboratories, among others. He was vice president of the Agriculture and Livestock Commission of Congress.

=== Links with Jarvis Chimenes Pavão ===
Gomes and his son, Alexandre Rodrigues Gomes, were subjected to a 54-page indictment stemming from Operation Pavo Real, which targeted a criminal organization led by Jarvis Chimenes Pavão, convicted for collaborating with the Primeiro Comando da Capital. According to the investigation, Gomes and his son allegedly "used their influence and experience" in the livestock and related sectors to move funds from drug trafficking and other illegal activities within the financial system. More specifically, the investigation stated that Gomes provided financial assistance to Pavão's group when its structure was weakened by the processes faced by several of its members, and that in this sense, Gomes and his son bought in 2020 the Negla Poty ranch, owned by Pavão, located in Bella Vista Norte, in the Department of Amambay.

== Death ==
Gomes died in the early hours of 19 August 2024, after being shot dead in his home by police officers, following a search warrant that was signed around 3:00 a.m., minutes after an indictment was issued against him and his son for money laundering linked to drug trafficking. His death received international press coverage. The procedure was criticized because, as a deputy, at the time of his death Gomes had parliamentary immunity, so he could only be arrested after a parliamentary procedure in which his immunity had to be stripped. The Paraguayan Prosecutor's Office argued that they were actually searching Gomes' home looking for his son, Alexandre Rodrigues Gomes, who is accused in the same case and does not have the benefits of immunity, but during the procedure the participants were received with gunfire by Gomes, which forced them to return fire.

== Personal life ==
=== Family ===
Gomes was the eldest of ten siblings. His sister Olga Gomes mentioned that he had a difficult childhood and that he sold ice cream when he was seven years old.

Gomes was married to pedagogue Joana Izabel Rodrigues, with whom he has four children.

=== Wealth ===
His sworn affidavit of assets drew attention due to the multimillion value of his assets, which amount to Gs. 979,214 million, representing more than US$129.2 million. He owned 14 properties, mostly in Pedro Juan Caballero and Yby Yaú, as well as seven vehicles and an aircraft. In addition, he had shares in the companies Salto Diamante and Paraguay Autopartes y Accesorios, cited in the fiscal investigation against him.
