= W. Barbrooke Grubb =

Missionary and explorer in Paraguay (1865–1930)

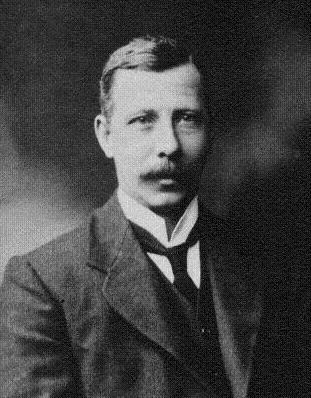
- W. Barbrooke Grubb
- Born: 11 August 1865; Liberton, Edinburgh
- Died: 28 May 1930 (aged 64); Edinburgh
- Resting place: Liberton Cemetery
- Occupations: Missionary and author
- Spouse: Mary Ann Varder Bridges

Wilfred Barbrooke Grubb (11 August 1865 – 28 May 1930) was a Scottish missionary and author. He has been described as "The Livingston of South America."

== Early life ==
Grubb was born on 11 August 1865 in Liberton, Edinburgh, a son of Arthur Alfred Barbrooke Grub and Ethel Barbrooke Grub (nee Lang).

== Missionary career ==
In 1884, aged 19, Grubb applied to the South American Missionary Society (SAMS). He was accepted and licensed as a lay reader in the Church of England.

== Personal and Later life ==
He married Mary Ann Varder Bridges on 15 May 1901, in Buenos Aires. They had two daughters, Anna (or Ethel) Barbrooke Grubb and Bertha Barbrooke Grubb.

In later life he lived in Lasswade, near Edinburgh where he died. He was buried in Liberton near Edinburgh.

== Works ==
- Among the Indians of the Paraguayan Chaco: A Story of Missionary Work in South America (1904)
- An Unknown People in an Unknown Land; an Account of the Life and Customs of the Lengua Indians of the Paraguayan Chaco, With Adventures and Experiences During Twenty years Pioneering and Exploration Amongst Them with Humphrey Tudor Morrey Jones, J B Lippincott Co. (1911)
- A Church in the Wildlands London: Seeley, Services and Co. Limited (1925)

== See also ==
- Bibliography of Paraguay
