= 1989 in Paraguay =

- Decades: 1960s; 1970s; 1980s; 1990s; 2000s
- See also: Other events of 1989; Timeline of Paraguayan history

Events in the year 1989 in Paraguay.

== Incumbents ==
- President: Alfredo Stroessner (until 3 February), Andrés Rodríguez (from 3 February)

== Events ==
- 2–3 February: 1989 Paraguayan coup d'état
- 1 May: 1989 Paraguayan general election
