= 1867 in Paraguay =

- Decades: 1840s; 1850s; 1860s; 1870s; 1880s
- See also: Other events of 1867; Timeline of Paraguayan history

Events in the year 1867 in Paraguay.

== Incumbents ==
- President: Francisco Solano López
- Vice President: Domingo Francisco Sánchez

== Events ==
- October 21 - Battle of Tatayibá
- October 28 - Battle of Potrero Obella
- November 3 - Second Battle of Tuyutí

== Deaths ==
- February 7 - José E. Díaz
