= 2017 in Paraguay =

- Decades: 1990s; 2000s; 2010s; 2020s; 2030s
- See also: Other events of 2017; Timeline of Paraguayan history

Events in the year 2017 in Paraguay.

== Incumbents ==
- President: Horacio Cartes

== Events ==
- 1 April – 2017 Paraguay protests: President Horacio Cartes's attempts to reform the Constitution to allow for re-election are met with mass protests with protestors storming the Congress and one death.
- 9 April - The Samsung Running Festival 2017 was held in Asunción, Paraguay. The marathon saw the participation of approximately 7,000 people, making it one of the largest events of its kind in the entire country.
- 24 April – In the early hours of the day a suspected Brazilian gang of robbers stole 11.7 million dollars from a security vault in Ciudad del Este, leaving one police officer dead. It is the biggest heist in Paraguay's history.
- 24 June – After 2–0 over Independiente de Campo Grande, Club Libertad wins the 2017 Paraguayan Apertura championship.
- 26,27 July - SOUTHCOM Commander visits Paraguay for regional, bilateral meetings.

== Deaths ==
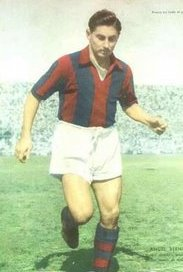
Ángel Berni

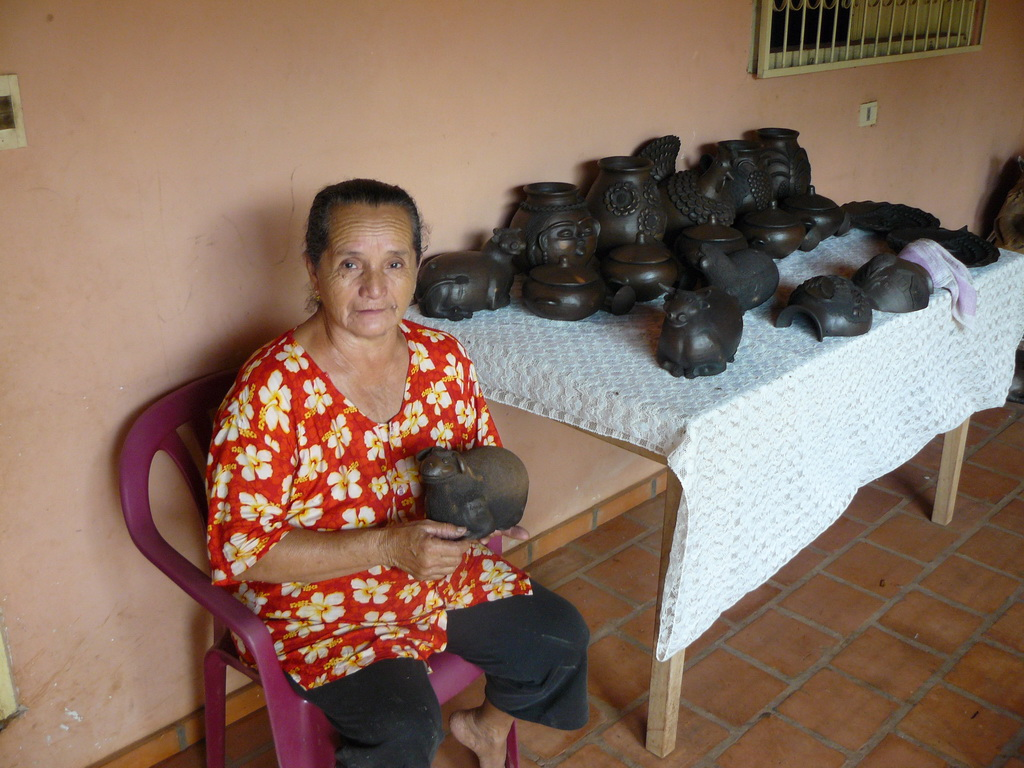
Rosa Brítez

- 9 January – Roberto Cabañas, footballer (b. 1961).
- 24 January – Porfirio Méndez, middle-distance runner (b. 1966).
- 25 July – Luis María Ramírez Boettner, lawyer and diplomat, Minister of Foreign Affairs (b. 1918).
- 2 October – Patrocinio Samudio, footballer (b. 1975).
- 24 November – Ángel Berni, footballer (b. 1931).
- 20 December – Rosa Brítez, potter (b. 1941).
