= 1866 in Paraguay =

- Decades: 1840s; 1850s; 1860s; 1870s; 1880s
- See also: Other events of 1866; Timeline of Paraguayan history

Events in the year 1866 in Paraguay.

== Incumbents ==
- President: Francisco Solano López
- Vice President: Domingo Francisco Sánchez

== Events ==
- January 31 - Battle of Pehuajó
- May 2 - Paraguayan War: Battle of Estero Bellaco
- May 24 - Battle of Tuyutí
- July 18 - Battle of Boquerón (1866)
- September 1–3 - Battle of Curuzú
- September 22 - Battle of Curupayty

== Deaths ==
- July 18 - Elizardo Aquino, general, killed in action
