= 1940 in Paraguay =

- Decades: 1920s; 1930s; 1940s; 1950s; 1960s
- See also: Other events of 1940; Timeline of Paraguayan history

Events in the year 1940 in Paraguay.

== Incumbents ==
- President of Paraguay: José Félix Estigarribia until September 7, then Higinio Moríñigo
- Minister of War and Navy: Higinio Moríñigo until September 7, then Paulino Ántola

== Events ==
- February 19 - President Estigarribia dissolves the legislature and suspends the Constitution
- August 4 - Paraguayan constitutional referendum, 1940
- September 7 - President Estigarribia and his wife are killed in a plane crash in Agapuey while on a tour of the interior.

== Deaths ==
- September 7 - Jose Felix Estigarribia, general and President, plane crash
