= Walter Harms =

Paraguayan politician (1962–2023)

Walter Harms (30 April 1962 – 2 December 2023) was a Paraguayan politician of the Colorado Party who served as a Deputy. He represented Itapúa department in the Chamber of Deputies.

He had his visa cancelled by the United States Government in August 2023, his wife and three children were also subject to the same sanctions. This move prohibited him and his family from entering the United States.

Harms belonged to the "Honor Colorado" faction of the Colorado Party, a faction that is loyal to former President of Paraguay Horacio Cartes, who was also sanctioned and blacklisted by the Government of the United States.

Harms was one of four people to die in a plane crash on 2 December 2023. He was 61.
