= Pettirossi (Asunción) =

Coordinates: 25°18′S 57°38′W

- Barrio
- Interactive map of Pettirossi
- Country: Paraguay
- Autonomous Capital District: Gran Asunción
- City: Asunción

Pettirossi is a neighbourhood (barrio) of Asunción, the capital and largest city of Paraguay.
