= Miss Universo Paraguay 2016 =

- Date: October 1, 2016
- Presenters: Carlos Troche; Jazmin Pazos
- Venue: AwA Resort, Encarnación, Paraguay
- Broadcaster: SNT
- Entrants: 15
- Placements: 8
- Winner: Andrea Melgarejo; Guairá
- Congeniality: Maria Graciela Acuña (Com. Paraguaya en España)

The Miss Universo Paraguay 2016 pageant was held at AwA Resort on October 1, 2016, to select Paraguayan representatives to 3 major beauty pageants: Miss Universe, Miss International and Miss Supranational. It was broadcast live on SNT.
For the first time in the history of this pageant, the event was held in Encarnación City, 365 km away from the Paraguayan capital.

== Results ==
=== Placements ===
Placement	Contestant
Miss Universe Paraguay 2016	Guairá – Andrea Melgarejo
Miss International Paraguay 2016	Itapúa – Tatiana Rolin
Miss Supranational Paraguay 2016	Fernando de la Mora – Viviana Florentin
Miss Pacific Paraguay	Central – Marta Díaz
Miss Bikini Paraguay	Com. Paraguay en USA – Laura Notario
1st Runner-Up	Caaguazú – Johana Leiva
2nd Runner-Up	Asunción – Lucía Maciel
3rd Runner-Up	Concepción – Kathia Martinez

== Special awards ==
Award	Contestant
Miss Top Model	Central - Marta Diaz
Best National Costume	Guairá - Andrea Melgarejo
Best Body	Guairá - Andrea Melgarejo

== Delegates ==
There are 15 official contestants.

Department/City	Candidate	Age	Height	Hometown
Alto Paraná	Jazmín Almada	20	1.73	Ciudad del Este
Asunción	Lucía Maciel	26	1.75	Asunción
Caaguazú	Johana Leiva	20	1.77	Coronel Oviedo
Caazapá	Karina Leguizamón	22	1.74	Caazapá
Canindeyú	Eva Franco	20	1.75	Salto del Guairá
Central	Marta Diaz	24	1.77	Asunción
Com. Paraguaya en España	María Graciela Acuña	19	1.78	Barcelona
Com. Paraguaya en USA	Laura "Coca" Notario	26	1.71	Miami
Concepción	Kathia Martínez	21	1.77	Horqueta
Cordillera	Elizabeth Jara	21	1.72	Caraguatay
Fernando de la Mora	Viviana Florentín	22	1.74	Fernando de la Mora
Guairá	Andrea Melgarejo	22	1.80	Asunción
Itapúa	Tatiana Rolin	24	1.75	Obligado
Misiones	Blanca Amarilla	25	1.77	Santiago
San Pedro	Delsy Olmedo	18	1.75	Capiíbary

== Contestants notes ==
- Some of the candidates participated, or will participate, in other important contests:
  - Andrea Melgarejo (Guairá) have represented her country at Miss Earth 2015 held in Vienna, Austria.
  - Blanca Amarilla (Misiones) represents Paraguay in Miss Atlántico Internacional 2013, the next year she won the title of Miss Verano 2014 in her country.

== See also ==
- Miss Paraguay
- Miss Universe 2016
- Miss International 2016
