= 1936 in Paraguay =

- Decades: 1910s; 1920s; 1930s; 1940s; 1950s
- See also: Other events of 1936; Timeline of Paraguayan history

Events in the year 1936 in Paraguay.

== Incumbents ==
- President: Eusebio Ayala until February 17; then Rafael Franco

== Events ==
- February Revolution (Paraguay)
  - 17 February - Revolutionaries capture Asunción and install Colonel Rafael Franco as President
- 5 September - former President Ayala leaves Paraguay in exile for Buenos Aires, Argentina, accompanied by general and future president José Félix Estigarribia
