= 1870 in Paraguay =

- Decades: 1850s; 1860s; 1870s; 1880s; 1890s
- See also: Other events of 1870; Timeline of Paraguayan history

The year 1870 is significant in Paraguayan history because it marks the end of the devastating War of the Triple Alliance, also known as the Paraguayan War. In this war, Paraguay fought against Brazil, Argentina and Uruguay. Some two-thirds of Paraguay's population died in the war and the country was also forced to surrender much of its territory.

== Incumbents ==
- President: Francisco Solano López
- Vice President: Domingo Francisco Sánchez

== Events ==
- March 1 - Battle of Cerro Corá, end of the Paraguayan War

== Deaths ==
- March 1 - Francisco Solano López, Domingo Francisco Sánchez, Juan Francisco López (son of Francisco Solano)
