= Ausberto Rodríguez Jara =

Paraguayan journalist and diplomat (1942–2025)

Ausberto Valentín Rodríguez Jara (9 February 1942 – August 2025) was a Paraguayan journalist and diplomat.

== Life and career ==
Rodríguez Jara was born on 9 February 1942 in Mariscal Estigarribia. In 1945, his parents moved with him to Asunción, where he attended primary and secondary school. In 1960, after graduating from high school, he began studying medicine in Montevideo and opposed the regime of Alfredo Stroessner. Eventually, he turned away from medical school and devoted himself to journalism. His journalistic work had taken him to Uruguay, Egypt, Spain, Zimbabwe and Argentina. Initially, his focus was the Strössner dictatorship. Later, he was a journalist for the Egyptian Radio and Television Union and a correspondent for various media and information agencies in Latin America and Spain. In 1996, after 36 years in exile, he returned to Paraguay and worked for various radio and television companies in the capital and in the interior. On 18 January 2009, the government of Fernando Lugo had unsuccessfully proposed him as ambassador to Montevideo.

From 29 December 2009 to 2 February 2015, he was ambassador in Cairo. From 20 December 2010 he was simultaneously ambassador to Ramallah (Palestine from 26 October 2010 to Manama (Bahrain) and Yaoundé (Cameroon) and from 4 May 2011 to Islamabad (Pakistan).

Rodríguez Jara died in August 2025, at the age of 83.
