= Juan Afara =

Paraguayan politician

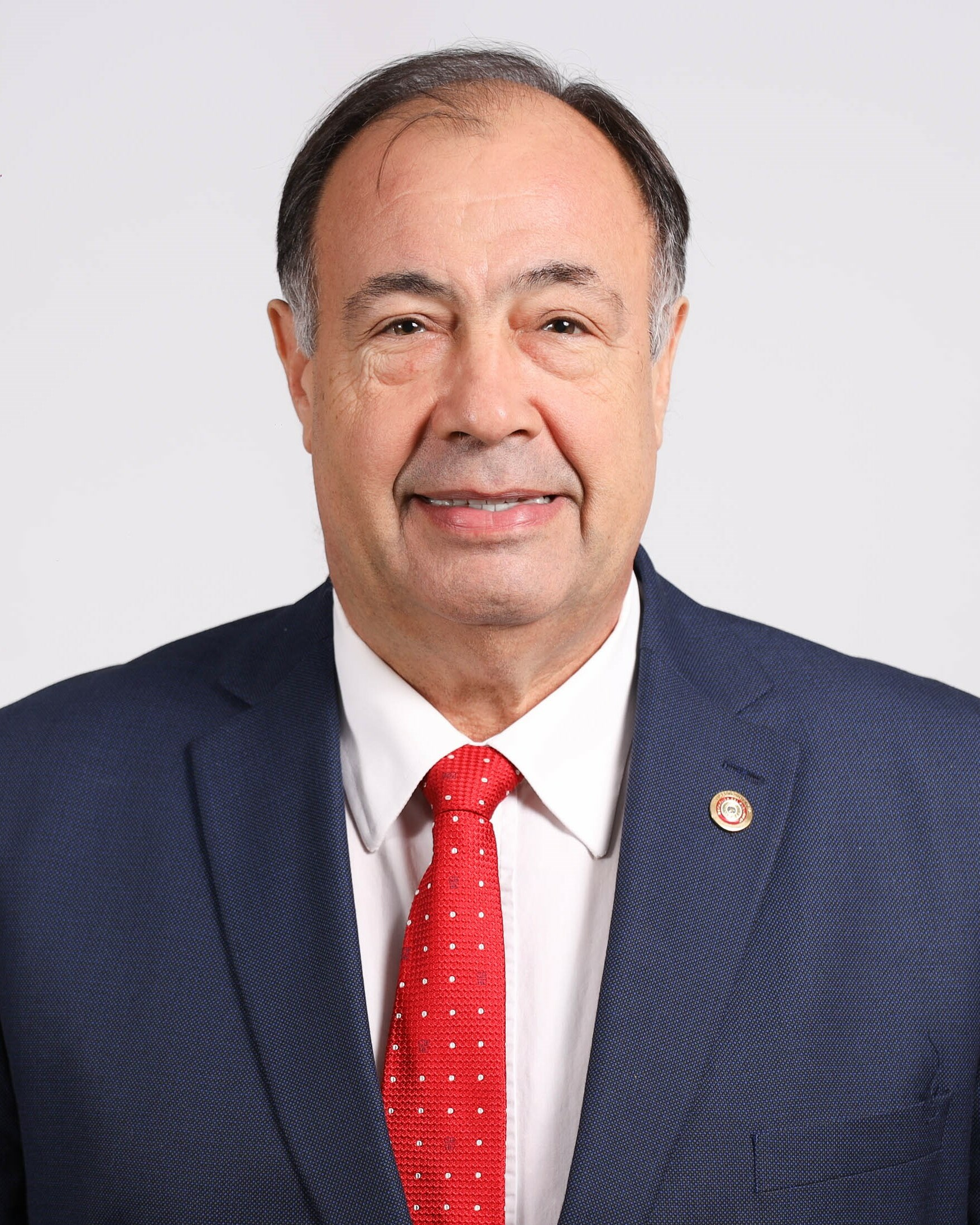
- Official portrait, 2023

Senator of Paraguay
- Incumbent
- Assumed office 30 June 2018

Vice President of Paraguay
- In office 15 August 2013 – 11 April 2018
- President: Horacio Cartes
- Preceded by: Óscar Denis
- Succeeded by: Alicia Pucheta

Governor of Itapúa
- In office 15 August 2008 – 19 October 2012
- Preceded by: David Benjamín Franz Kugler
- Succeeded by: Luis Viedma

Mayor of Tomás Romero Pereira
- In office 19 December 1996 – 19 December 2001
- In office 15 January 1987 – 4 March 1989

Personal details
- Born: Juan Eudes Afara Maciel; 19 August 1960 (age 66) Santa Rosa, Misiones Department, Paraguay
- Party: Colorado Party
- Spouse: Luz Marilda Arguello
- Children: 4

Juan Eudes Afara Maciel (born 19 August 1960) is a Paraguayan politician, currently serving as senator since 2018. He previously served as Horacio Cartes' vice president from 2013 to 2018.

== Awards and honors ==
- Order of Brilliant Star with Special Grand Cordon – Republic of China
