= Paraguay–Philippines relations =

- Paraguay: Philippines

Paraguay–Philippines relations refers to the bilateral relations between Paraguay and the Philippines. Paraguay has an embassy in Manila. The Philippines is accredited to Paraguay from its embassy in Buenos Aires, Argentina and maintains an honorary consulate in Asunción. Both countries are predominantly Roman Catholic, and are former Spanish colonies.

== History ==
Relations between Paraguay and the Philippines began before they became nations. For a time after the establishment of the Manila galleons that linked Latin America with Asia, Spain prohibited direct trade between the Viceroyalty of Peru, which included Paraguay, and the Viceroyalty of New Spain, which included the Philippines. However, illegal trade between Filipinos and Paraguayans continued in secret, as illegal Asian goods ended up in the markets of Paraguay, due to the collusion between Filipino, Peruvian, and Paraguayan merchants. They settled and traded with each other while contravening royal mercantile laws. Paraguay and the Philippines shares a common thread of history—they are the only two former Spanish colonies where the population is more fluent in a native language than in Spanish. In Paraguay, the majority speak Guarani, while in the Philippines, most people speak Tagalog and other native Philippine languages.

Paraguay and the Philippines were also deeply influenced by the Jesuit Order. In Paraguay, the Jesuits founded the Jesuit Reductions of Paraguay, an alliance of semi-autonomous Catholic-Native syncretistic city-states that functioned semi-independently of imperial control and had waged war against Portuguese slavers called Bandeirantes. The Jesuits' support of native Paraguayan Guaranis against the slavery imposed against them by imperial authorities, partially caused their temporary suppression and the martyrdom of several Jesuits. The suppression of the Jesuits in Latin America incited the Latin American nations to rebel as the European Empires removed their Jesuit advocates of indigenous rights. Paraguay also partially inspired the French Revolution as Voltaire, an enlightenment philosopher who was a think-tank in the French Revolution, praised the Utopian Jesuit Reductions in Paraguay as a "Triumph of Humanity". It also directly partially caused the events that lead to the independence of the Philippines as the Suppression of the Jesuits allowed their vacated parishes in the Philippines to be taken over by the Order of Augustinian Recollects who gave their former parishes to the Diocesan Clergy, a move that was obedient to the Papal States' Council of Trent, stipulating that once a territory is no longer an area for missionaries, indigenous clergy should reign; however, this was opposed by the Gallicanism-styled Patronato real of Spanish-Philippines that preferred to install clergy from Spain and the foreign monastic orders, rather than clergy from the native Philippines. Controversy over Philippine priests versus foreign priests spilled out into the martyrdom of the Filipino priests: Gomez, Burgos, and Zamora, known together as the (GOMBURZA). They were abnormally implicated into the Cavite Mutiny, whose infamy lead to the priests' execution by the Spanish. Seeing as the Spanish Empire had no regrets killing holy men of the cloth, Jose Rizal, the Philippines' national hero who was educated by the Jesuits upon the restoration of the Order, he wrote two novels dedicated to the martyred priests. Rizal's ideas then birthed the Philippine Revolution before he himself was executed. Paraguay and the Philippines may have their native languages preserved since their revolutions were church-guided and led by Diocesan Priests, Jesuits, and Augustinian Recollects, who took pains to preserve native languages and cultures. By contrast, other revolutions in Latin America mass adopted Enlightenment Secular ideals which is anti-clerical, and caused soft cultural genocide due to overemphasis on modernization and the discarding of antiquitated native culture. Quaintly, the elite schools of the Philippines dedicated for the education of girls are run by the Nuns of the Assumption, whereas the elite schools for boys of the country are run by the Jesuits who also once helped build Paraguay. Interestingly, Ascuncion, the capital of Paraguay, is named after the Assumption, being the Spanish term for it.

Official relations between Paraguay and the Philippines were established on December 12, 1962.

In May 2026, Paraguay President Santiago Peña visited the Philippines, marking the first-ever state visit by a Paraguayan leader to the country. The visit highlighted the deepening diplomatic and economic ties between Paraguay and the Philippines.

== Resident diplomatic missions ==
- Paraguay has an embassy in Manila.
- The Philippines has a non-resident ambassador in Buenos Aires.

== See also ==
- Foreign relations of Paraguay
- Foreign relations of the Philippines
