= Agustín Ramón Martínez =

Paraguayan-Israeli serial killer (1961–2024)

- Born: Agustín Ramón Martínez Martínez; 28 August 1961; San Patricio, Paraguay
- Died: 18 May 2024 (aged 62); Tacumbú Prison, Asunción, Paraguay
- Other names: "Israeli Soldier"; Yamel Yamil Oskiski; Yamel Yamil Fresmann
- Conviction: Murder ×3
- Penalty: 8 years (Bianco); 6 years (Vargas); 40 years (Cardozo)

Details
- Victims: 6–7+
- Span of crimes: 1993–2018
- Country: Argentina, Paraguay (possibly Israel)
- States: Santa Fe, Paraguarí
- Date apprehended: For the final time on 23 May 2018

Agustín Ramón Martínez Martínez (28 August 1961 – 18 May 2024), known as Israeli Soldier (Spanish: Soldado Israelí), was a Paraguayan-Israeli serial killer and fraudster who killed at least six people in Argentina and Paraguay from 1993 to 2018, but was suspected in other murders. For his last murder, he was sentenced to 40 years' imprisonment.

== Early life ==
Agustín Ramón Martínez Martínez was born on 28 August 1961, in San Patricio, Misiones Department. He grew up in a Jewish family and moved with them to Israel when he was young. He married there, but eventually returned to Paraguay after his wife died under suspicious circumstances. Interpol later sought to investigate him over the case, but never charged him due to a lack of evidence.

Once in Paraguay, Martínez allegedly began working as a thief and hitman for organized crime groups, and was arrested several times in his home country and in Argentina. During these arrests, he claimed his real name was Yamel Yamil Oskiski (or Fresmann), and that he had served as a mercenary for the IDF during the Gulf War. These claims have never been confirmed, and are widely believed to be fabricated.

== Serial murders ==
Martínez committed his first known murder on 31 May 1993, when he shot and killed ranch foreman Pascual Pedro Bianco in Santa Fe, Argentina over a land dispute. Bianco's wife, Nélida Elena Borsatto, was also wounded but survived. After the murder, Martínez dismembered the body and set the remains on fire. He was quickly caught, convicted and sentenced to 8 years' imprisonment, but escaped a year into his sentence and returned to Paraguay.

It is believed that during his escape he committed another murder on 25 August 1994. On that date, truck driver Miguel Ángel Flores García's burned body was found next to his truck along Route 1 near Caapucú, with an autopsy determining that he had been shot three times. Suspicion fell on Martínez due to his similar modus operandi, but he was never charged with the crime.

On 11 April 1995, he shot and burned the body of cattle rancher Ignacio Antonio Vargas, known as 'Nene', who owned the Ypoa Ranch in Quiindy. At the time, Martínez had been working as a secretary-bodyguard for him, but his motive for the crime is unclear.

As a result of his escape from Argentina and the subsequent murders in Caapucú and Quiindy, Interpol issued an arrest warrant for him. He was captured in Asunción on 7 November 1998, after a heated gun battle with police. Since he could only be positively linked to the murder of Vargas, Martínez was convicted of that murder and sentenced to 6 years' imprisonment. While in prison, he claimed that he had pertinent information relating to the AMIA bombing and was extradited to Argentina in 2001 in order to testify and serve his sentence for the 1993 murder. Upon his release, Martínez again returned to Paraguay.

On 23 May 2009, 50-year-old former councilman and cattle rancher Ricardo Cecilio Cabello Cazal, along with his farmhands Hilario Marecos and Alberto Medina Blanco, were murdered, their bodies dismembered and subsequently burned in an oven in Ybycuí. A few days later, Martínez, who was working as a business partner and bodyguard for Cabello at the time, was arrested as the main suspect. Several other men were arrested as alleged accomplices as well. He was held awaiting trial for the triple murder until 2015, when he was released thanks to a habeas corpus given for a judicial delay, because he had not been given a firm sentence during that time.

=== Final murder ===
On 22 May 2018, 54-year-old lawyer Lucilo Nicolás Cardozo Salina received a call from Martínez, an acquaintance of his, telling him that he needed him for a court case in Encarnación. Cardozo went out in his pickup truck, a Mitsubishi Triton, and picked up Martínez along the Route 1 in Yaguarón. Along the way, Martínez shot him with a sawed-off 7.62 caliber rifle before dismembering and burning the body, which he buried before stealing the truck. Cardozo's wife, after taking notice of her husband's absence, tracked the truck with a GPS and located it at Martínez's home. On the following day, Martínez was arrested as the prime suspect in Cardozo's disappearance.

== Trial and imprisonment ==
After his arrest, Martínez instantly confessed that he had a hand in Cardozo's disappearance, but denied killing him. According to his claims, an alleged drug trafficker named Lucio Santiago Godoy Quiñónez promised him $10,000 if he delivered the lawyer to him, which he accepted. Once he was picked up by Cardozo, he took him to an area where Godoy and another man, Alex Heiki Willer Fidalski, killed him. The men, whom Martínez alleged to be members of the Brazilian criminal group PCC, later tasked him with disposing of the body and the truck. In order to back up his claims, he showed the burial site to the investigators, with the body being recovered a few days later.

Over the course of the investigation, multiple other suspects were arrested on suspicion of being involved in the murder, but investigators eventually ruled out third-party involvement. Due to this, some hypothesized that the actual reason for Cardozo's murder was so Martínez could steal his truck. On his part, Martínez repeatedly professed that he was only guilty of disposing of the body, and later claimed that he was tortured by police officials.

Martínez's trial was postponed a total of eleven times. After it finally started in 2022, he was found guilty of killing Cardozo and sentenced to 40 years' imprisonment. During the sentencing, he reacted violently and attempted to assault the officers guarding him, which resulted in his being subdued and handcuffed.

== Death ==
Martínez died at Tacumbú prison in Asunción, on 18 May 2024, at the age of 62. Police sources described it as an "apparent case of sudden death".

== See also ==
- List of serial killers by country
