= Derlis Rodríguez (politician) =

Paraguayan politician (1979–2025)

Derlis Rodríguez Baez (December 29, 1979 – August 4, 2025) was a Paraguayan lawyer and politician.

== Life and career ==
Rodriguez was born on December 29, 1979. He was a member of the Chamber of Deputies of Paraguay from 2023 until his death, with the Colorado Party.

Rodríguez died due to complications of respiratory failure in Asunción, on August 4, 2025, at the age of 45. Three days of national mourning were announced following his death.
