= 2012 in Paraguay =

- Decades: 1990s; 2000s; 2010s; 2020s; 2030s
- See also: Other events of 2012; Timeline of Paraguayan history

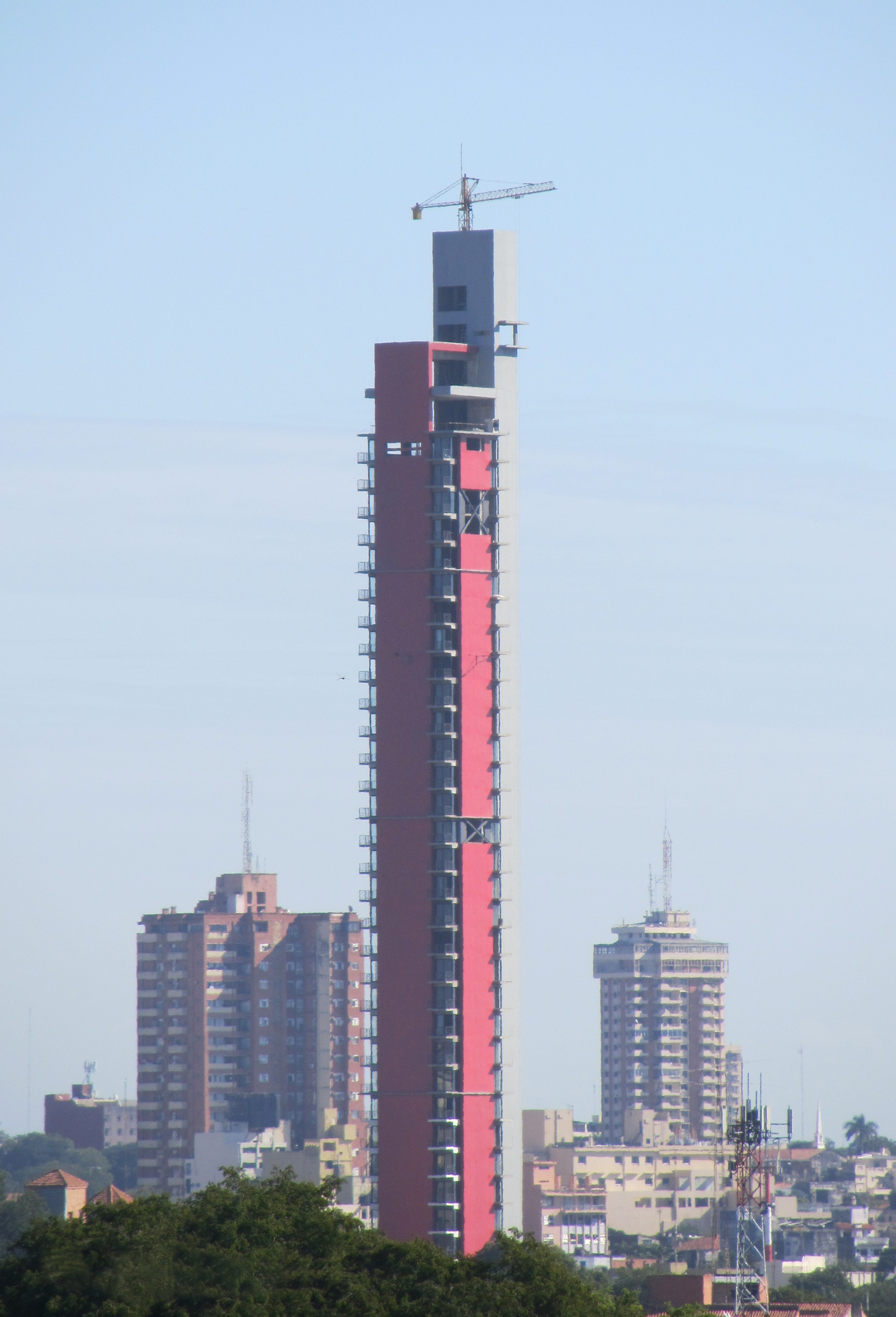
icono Paraguay.jpg

Events from the year 2012 in Paraguay

== Incumbents ==
- President:
  - Fernando Lugo (until 22 June)
  - Federico Franco (took office 22 June)

== Events ==
- June 21 - President Fernando Lugo is impeached and removed from office

== Sport ==
- 27 July to 12 August - Paraguay at the 2012 Summer Olympics

=== Unknown dates ===
- 2012 in Paraguayan football

== Deaths in 2012 ==
=== January ===
- 1 January - Hermann Guggiari, 87, engineer and sculptor. (born 1924) (Spanish)
