= Luis Irrazábal =

Paraguayan military officer (1891-1958)

Luis Irrazábal Barboza
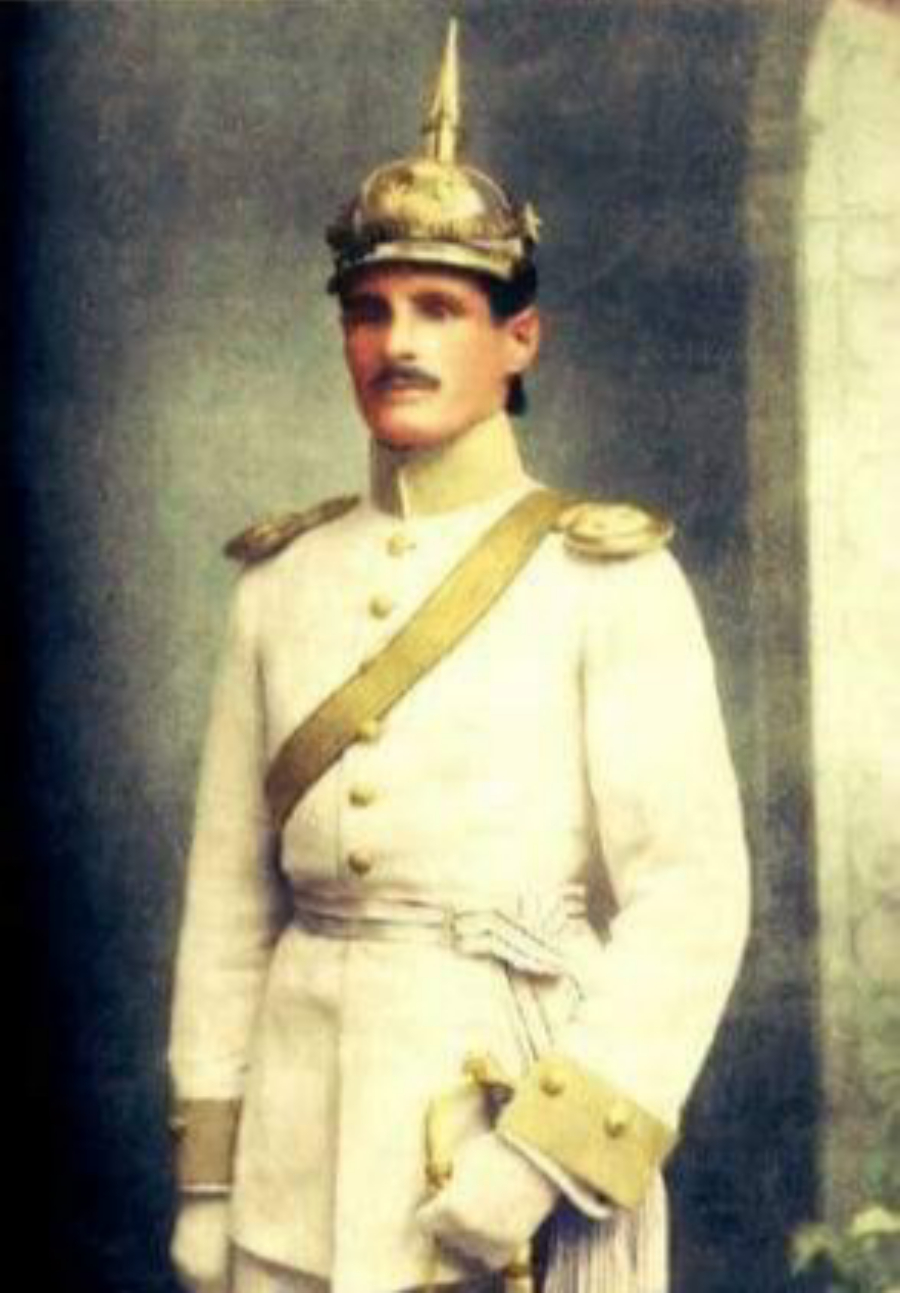

Personal details
- Born: 8 August 1891 Encarnación, Paraguay
- Died: 16 March 1958 (aged 66) Asunción, Paraguay
- Awards: Chaco Cross

Military service
- Allegiance: Paraguay
- Branch/service: Paraguayan Army
- Rank: Colonel
- Commands: 1st Cavalry Regiment Valois Rivarola; 5th Infantry Division; 3rd Corps
- Battles/wars: Chaco War; First Battle of Nanawa; Second Battle of Nanawa

Luis Irrazábal Barboza (8 August 1891 – 16 March 1958) was a Paraguayan military officer, active during the Chaco War with Bolivia.

== Biography ==
=== Early life ===
Irrazábal was born in Encarnación, in Itapúa Department, Paraguay. He went to elementary school in Encarnación and to high school in Asunción, the capital. On April 1, 1913, at the age of 22, he joined the Paraguayan Army. This was a period of reorganization following the 1911 Civil War.

=== Military career ===
As it was peacetime, Irrazábal was sent to continue his studies in Chile. Upon his return, he was sent to the garrison in Paraguarí, where he worked on the organization of a cavalry regiment, No. 1 “Valois Rivarola”. On February 10, 1926, he was designated to command it. He was also the creator of the Army's riding school. During his time in Paraguarí, he founded a polo club there, and conducted riding shows in the nearby cities.

In 1928, his unit was sent to cover the area of Bahía Negra amidst rising tensions with Bolivia. Now a colonel, Irrazábal was sent to Belgium in a mission to study as a staff officer. In 1932, however, the Chaco War with Bolivia started. By September of that year, he was back in Asunción and was named commanding officer for the forces around Fort Nanawa, considered the strongest point of the Paraguayan line in the Chaco. Two months later, he was named commander of the 5th Infantry Division, a unit still being organized around Nanawa.

On January 20, 1933, the Bolivian forces began a strong offensive against Nanawa, which lasted until the 26th when it was finally called off. The Paraguayan forces were under Irrazábal's overall command and suffered low losses when compared to those of the Bolivians. As the fort was surrounded by them, Irrazábal ordered a landing strip to be cleared inside its perimeter, which allowed Paraguayan aircraft to resupply the defenders. He is quoted as having said, then: "Once we run out of ammunition we will engage in one on one combat, but we will not retreat from Fort Nanawa”. He was awarded the Chaco Cross medal for his conduct of the battle.

On July of the same year, the Bolivian Army once again attacked Nanawa. A mine had been dug under the fort's walls and part of them were blown up, signaling the attack's start. Once more the fort held under Irrazábal's leadership.

The Paraguayan Army's victories led to José Félix Estigarribia, another Paraguayan officer, being promoted to the position of Commander in Chief of the Army. Irrazábal came to resent this. He said to Estigarribia: “You keep going, being promoted, General, we will continue, in our positions in combat, so you could keep winning medals”. This cost him his job and his position in the army. After the war he was appointed military attaché in Buenos Aires, and later in Santiago de Chile and Peru.

He died in Asunción, on March 16, 1958.
