= Óscar Denis =

Paraguayan politician

Oscar Denis Sánchez
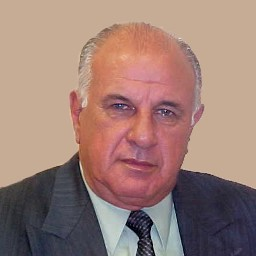

Vice President of Paraguay
- In office 28 June 2012 – 15 August 2013
- President: Federico Franco
- Preceded by: Federico Franco
- Succeeded by: Juan Afara

Personal details
- Born: October 2, 1946 (age 79) Concepción, Paraguay
- Party: Authentic Radical Liberal Party

Oscar Denis Sánchez (born 2 October 1946, in Concepción) is a Paraguayan politician and former Vice President. He was elected in June 2012. Upon his election he was Senator in the Senate of Paraguay.

== Information ==
Previously he was the governor of Concepción Department 1993–1998 and a member of the Chamber of Deputies 1998–2003. He is a chemist by profession.

== 2020 kidnapping ==
Denis was kidnapped along with one of his employees, on 9 September 2020 near Concepción, not far from the site where the Paraguayan army had dismantled a Paraguayan People’s Army (EPP) training area a week before. On 11 September, it was officially revealed that this organization was responsible for the abductions. As of February 2026, Denis's fate is unknown.

== See also ==
- List of kidnappings
- List of people who disappeared mysteriously (2000–present)

Political offices
Preceded by Federico Franco	Vice President of Paraguay; 2012–2013	Succeeded by Juan Afara
