= Zulma Gómez =

Paraguayan politician (1961–2022)

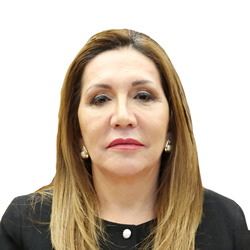
- Gómez in 2018

Senator of the Republic of Paraguay
- In office 30 June 2008 – 31 July 2022
- Succeeded by: Daniel Rojas

Member of the Chamber of Deputies
- In office 30 June 2003 – 30 June 2008

Personal details
- Born: Zulma Ramona Gómez Cáceres; 9 January 1961 Coronel Oviedo, Paraguay
- Died: 31 July 2022 (aged 61) Ciudad del Este, Paraguay
- Party: Authentic Radical Liberal Party
- Occupation: Physician, politician

Zulma Ramona Gómez Cáceres (9 January 1961 – 31 July 2022) was a Paraguayan physician and politician of the Authentic Radical Liberal Party. She was a member of the Chamber of Deputies from 2003 to 2008 and Senate of Paraguay from 2008 until her death.

== Political career ==
Gómez was born in Coronel Oviedo. She served as a senator for Paraguay from 2008 until her death. She was previously a deputy from 2003 to 2008. She was a member of the Authentic Radical Liberal Party (PLRA), although she also declared herself a supporter of Horacio Cartes, former president of Paraguay of the Colorado Party.

Gómez was involved in several controversies and, on several occasions, used vulgar language to defend herself. This included supporting Cartes's re-election plans in 2017 (which resulted in the 2017 Paraguayan crisis) and defending Colorado Senator Óscar González Daher, after the leaking of audios that revealed that he committed influence peddling (which is illegal under Paraguayan law), which earned Gómez several requests for suspension in the PLRA. Gómez also admitted to having applied for positions in Itaipú Binacional and exercising influence peddling herself "to help people".

== Death ==
Gómez was found dead on the morning of 31 July 2022 on the shores of Lake Acaray in Ciudad del Este. Accounts provided by her relatives indicated that the night before, Gómez held a political meeting with young people, on a farm she owned, after which she had slept on a mattress on a dock at the lakeside farm. A granddaughter twice asked Gómez to go inside the house, but she instead both times refused, stating that she needed to "reflect", and when the granddaughter went a third time, she no longer found her. A coroner who examined the body stated that the cause of death was suffocation due to drowning, and that the body presented injuries consistent with an apparent accidental fall, but that authorities would also carry out a toxicological analysis.

News of Gómez's death received international coverage. As a result of her death, the Congress of Paraguay declared three days of mourning.
