= Alicia Pucheta =

Paraguayan lawyer and politician

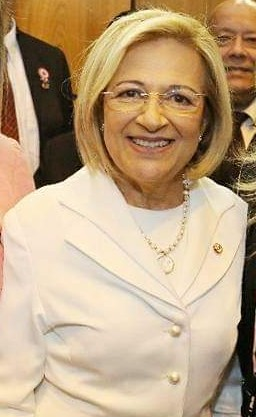
- Pucheta in 2018

Vice President of Paraguay
- In office 9 May 2018 – 15 August 2018
- President: Horacio Cartes
- Preceded by: Juan Afara
- Succeeded by: Hugo Velázquez

Personal details
- Born: Alicia Beatriz Pucheta Valoriani; 14 January 1950 (age 76) Asunción, Paraguay
- Party: Colorado Party
- Spouse: Carlos Alberto Correa Vera (died 2016)
- Children: 2

Alicia Beatriz Pucheta de Correa (née Pucheta Valoriani; born 14 January 1950) is a Paraguayan lawyer and politician who served as Vice President of Paraguay for three months in 2018. Pucheta is the first woman to occupy the Vice Presidency of Paraguay.

== Vice President of Paraguay ==
On 11 April 2018, the Vice President of Paraguay Juan Afara left the Vice Presidency to run as a Senator in the 2018 general election. Pucheta was nominated by the President of Paraguay Horacio Cartes to replace Afara as Vice President of Paraguay later that month. At the time of her nomination, Pucheta was a Justice in the Supreme Court of Justice of Paraguay; she resigned from the position on 30 April. Pucheta's nomination was criticized by reports that considered the designation as an award to Pucheta for having, as a member of the Supreme Court, allowed Cartes' candidacy to the Senate in the 2018 general election, even though it was not allowed by the Constitution. She assumed the position on 9 May 2018; she became the first woman to occupy the Vice Presidency of Paraguay.

President Cartes affirmed that he would resign from the Presidency before the end of his tenure on 15 August 2018 to take up a Senate seat, in which case Pucheta would have become the first woman to be President of Paraguay, and also the first woman to become Vice President and President without having been elected by popular vote. However, Cartes withdrew his resignation request on 26 June 2018, after his resignation was not voted by Congress.

== Personal life ==
Pucheta is the daughter of Justo Pucheta Ortega and Beatriz Valoriani. Her father was also a musician; he was part of a musical duo who recorded the first album of Paraguayan music in 1926. After the Chaco War, he went to Pilar as a criminal judge, where he met Pucheta's mother. Once married, they set up residence in Asunción.

Pucheta was married to a colleague, the lawyer Carlos Alberto Correa Vera. She is the mother of two sons: Hugo Armando, who followed his parents' footsteps, and Luis Arturo, who chose a career in medicine. Correa Vera died on 30 June 2016.

Political offices
Preceded by Juan Afara	Vice President of Paraguay; 2018	Succeeded by Hugo Velázquez
