= Second Battle of Nanawa =

1933 battle of the Chaco War

- Part of the Chaco War
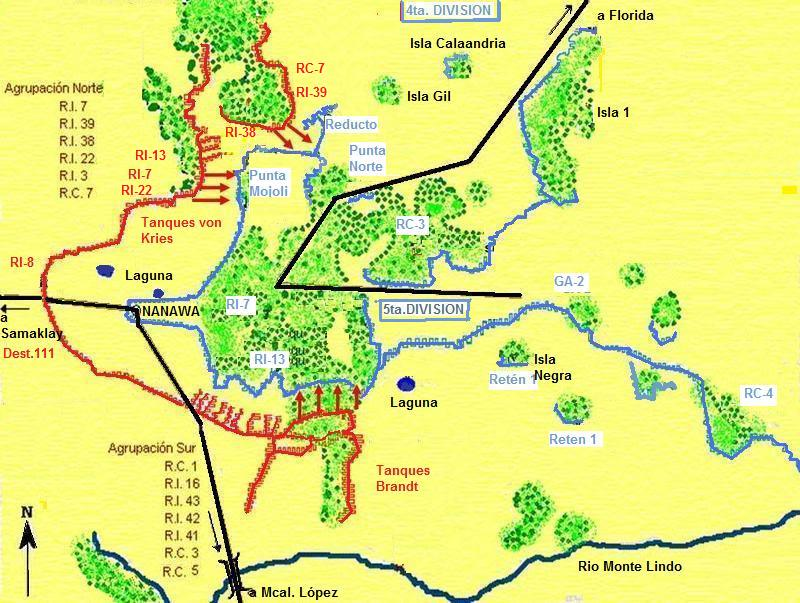
- Map of the battle
Date	4–9 July 1933
Location	Gran Chaco 23°29′15″S 59°46′09″W
Result	Paraguayan victory

Belligerents
Bolivia	Paraguay

Commanders and leaders
(Bolivia) Hans Kundt	(Paraguay) Luis Irrazábal

Units involved
(Bolivia) 4th Division (Bolivia) 9th Division	(Paraguay) 5th Division

Strength
9,000; 3 light tanks 2 tankettes	9,000; 4 fighter-bombers

Casualties and losses
1,600; 1 tank destroyed 2 tankettes	500; 3 aircraft damaged
- Location within Paraguay Second Battle of Nanawa (South America) Second Battle of Nanawa (America)

The Second Battle of Nanawa was fought from the 4 to 9 July 1933, between the Bolivian and Paraguayan armies during the Chaco War. It was one of the bloodiest battles fought in South America in the 20th century, coming to be labeled as the "South American Verdun" by comparison with the Battle of Verdun of World War I.

== Background ==
The battle was the last Bolivian attempt to capture the heavily fortified stronghold of Nanawa, a salient in the southern front. By capturing Nanawa the Bolivian army hoped to isolate Isla Poí, the Paraguayan headquarters and main water supply point to the northeast, and ultimately reach the city of Concepción, on the Paraguay River. Nanawa (Enxet for "carob tree forest") had been founded as a small outpost in 1928 by Ivan Belaieff, a white Russian officer who joined the Paraguayan army in the 1920s. In December 1932 the Bolivian army took over a number of Paraguayan outposts between Nanawa and the Pilcomayo River, on the border with Argentina. Realising that a major offensive was looming, the fort's commander, Colonel Luis Irrazábal, built up a horseshoe-shaped defense facing west around the old outpost and gathered under his command four regiments and several minor units that made up the Paraguayan Fifth Division. On January 20, 1933, Nanawa was the subject of a massive Bolivian assault, which stalled after several days of heavy fighting and was eventually beaten back by the Paraguayan garrison. The Bolivian army suffered 2,000 casualties. By March, Nanawa became the headquarters of the Paraguayan III Army Corps.

== Battle ==
The battle began on the 4 July at 9:00 a.m. with the explosion of a large mine just 30 yards short of the main Paraguayan redoubt, followed by a massive frontal attack. Part of the redoubt was seized by the attackers. The Bolivian army engaged the defenders with artillery and mortar fire, air strikes, three Vickers light tanks, two Carden-Lloyd tankettes and four flamethrowers. The Bolivian troops staged a two-pronged assault, one from the north and the other from the south, while a diversionary force established a blocking position in the center. The Paraguayan troops responded with their own artillery fire and 7.62mm armor-piercing rounds. They eventually recovered the fortifications that had been overrun by the Bolivians.

The Bolivians lost one tank to artillery fire, while one of the tankettes was damaged by small-arms fire and the other became stuck in a ditch. Both of them were withdrawn from the front line after this battle, while the crippled tank was eventually blown up by Paraguayan sappers. Four Potez 25s fighter-bombers being used as transport aircraft resupplied the exhausted Paraguayan stockpiles by delivering hand grenades and ammunition. The planes were stripped of their rear machine guns in order to use the gunner's cockpit to load 115 kilograms (254 lb) of ammunition. The aircraft departed from Isla Poí to the south flying over hostile territory and landed on an improvised airstrip close to the battle lines. The airstrip had been hastily built during the first Bolivian offensive. The pilots handed over 1,650 kg of ammunition to the stronghold on the first day of operation. Three Potez 25s were hit by ground fire and forced to make hard landings, but all were eventually recovered and rebuilt.

== Aftermath ==
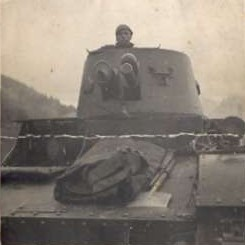
A Vickers Mark E type B, the same kind of tank employed by the Bolivian army in their second assault on Nanawa

Once the assault was repelled, the Paraguayans launched an unsuccessful counterattack on 11 July on enemy positions outside the complex, in a wooded area southwest of the Paraguayan outpost of Gondra. The second battle of Nanawa was a major turning point in the war, since the Paraguayan army regained the strategic initiative that had belonged to the Bolivians since early 1933.
