= Bibliography of Paraguay =

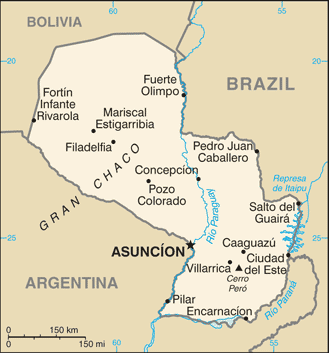

This is a bibliography of Paraguay.

== Geography and natural history ==
- Attenborough, David, Zoo Quest in Paraguay (1959; Lutterworth Press)
- Durrell, Gerald, The Drunken Forest (1956; Penguin)
- Hayes, Floyd E., Status, Distribution and Biogeography of the Birds of Paraguay (1995, American Birding Association)
- Kerr, John Graham, A Naturalist in the Chaco (1968; Greenwood Press)
- Kleinpenning, Jan M. G., Paraguay, 1515-1870: A Thematic Geography of Its Development (2003; Iberoamericana)
- Lewis, Daniel K., A South American Frontier: The Tri-Border Region (2006; Chelsea House Publications)

== History ==
=== General ===
- Chamorro T., Fabián, Historia del Paraguay: desde la independencia hasta nuestros días (2019; Editorial Goya; in Spanish)
- Lambert, Peter & Nickson, Andrew (eds.), The Paraguay Reader: History, Culture, Politics (2013, Duke University Press)
- Lewis, Paul H., Socialism, Liberalism and Dictatorship in Paraguay (1982; Greenwood Press)
- Macintyre, Ben, Forgotten Fatherland: The Search for Elizabeth Nietzsche (1993; Broadway)
- Mora, Frank O. and Cooney, Jerry W., Paraguay and the United States: Distant Allies (2007; University of Georgia Press)
- Nickson, Andrew, Historical Dictionary of Paraguay (2015, Rowman and Littlefield)
- Souter, Gavin, A Peculiar People: the Australians in Paraguay (1968; University of Queensland Press)
- Stoesz, Edward, Like a Mustard Seed: Mennonites in Paraguay (2008; Herald Press)
- Warren, Harris G., Paraguay: an informal history (1949, University of Oklahoma Press)
- Washburn, Charles Ames, The History of Paraguay (1871/2005; Adamant Media Corporation)
- Whitehead, Anne, Paradise Mislaid: In Search of the Australian Tribe of Paraguay (1998; University of Queensland Press)

=== Economic history ===
- Ashwell, Washington, Historia económica del Paraguay: de sus orígenes al gobierno de Carlos Antonio López (1536-1862) (2015; Servilibro; in Spanish)
- Ashwell, Washington, Historia económica del Paraguay: Estructura y dinámica de la economía nacional, 1870-1925 (1989; C. Schauman; in Spanish)
- Ashwell, Washington, Historia económica del Paraguay: Colapso y abandono del sistema liberal, 1923-1946 (1996; Servilibro; in Spanish)
- Ashwell, Washington, Historia económica del Paraguay: La porfía por un orden democrático y por una reactivación económica, 1946-2008 (1996; Servilibro; in Spanish)
- Campos D., Luis, Apuntes de historia económica del Paraguay: desarrollo, auge y decadencia de una economía de enclaves (2010; Intercontinental Editora; in Spanish)
- Herken-Krauer, Juan Carlos, El Paraguay rural entre 1869 y 1913: contribución a la historia económica regional del Plata (1984; Centro Paraguayo de Estudios Sociológicos; in Spanish)
- Rivarola P., Juan B., Historia Monetaria del Paraguay (1982; Imprenta El Gráfico; in Spanish)
- Villagra, Luis (org.), Proceso histórico de la economía paraguaya (2012; Secretaria Nacional de Cultura; in Spanish)

=== Colonial era ===
- Garrett, Victoria L. and Loaeza, Pablo García (eds.), The Improbable Conquest: Sixteenth-Century Letters from the Río de la Plata (2014; Latin American Originals)
- Gott, Richard, Land Without Evil: Utopian Journeys Across the South American Watershed (1993; Verso)
- López, Adelberto, The Colonial History of Paraguay: The Revolt of the Comuneros, 1721-1735 (2005; Transaction Publishers)
- Morison, Samuel Eliot, European Discovery of America: Southern Voyages, A.D.1492-1616 (1974; Oxford University Press)

=== The Jesuits and the reducciones ===
- Abdou, Sélim, The Jesuit Republic of the Guaranis (1609-1768) and its Heritage (1997; Crossroad)
- Caraman, Philip, The Lost Paradise: The Jesuit Republic in South America (1976; Seabury Press)
- Cunninghame-Graham, Robert Bontine, A Vanished Arcadia: Being Some Account of the Jesuits in Paraguay, 1607 to 1767 (1901; various publishers - in public domain)
- Jaenike, William F., Black Robes in Paraguay: The Success of the Guarani Missions Hastened the Abolition of the Jesuits (2008; Kirk House Publishers)
- Koebel, William Henry, In Jesuit Land: The Jesuit Missions of Paraguay (1912/2010; Cornell University Library)
- McNaspy, C. J., Lost Cities of Paraguay: Art and Architecture of the Jesuit Reductions, 1607-1767 (1982; Loyola University Press)
- Sarreal, Julia, The Guarani and their missions (2014, Stanford University Press)
- Satterlee, D., The Role of Productivity in Community Success: The Jesuit-Guaraní Cultural Confluence (2013; CreateSpace Independent Publishing Platform)

=== The Francia period ===
- Whigham, Thomas, The Politics of River Trade: Tradition and Development in the Upper Plata, 1780-1870 (1991; University of New Mexico Press)
- Williams, John Hoyt, The Rise and Fall of the Paraguayan Republic, 1800-1870 (1979; University of Texas Press)

=== Triple Alliance War and the López ===
- Barret, William Edmund, Woman on Horseback: the Biography of Francisco Lopez and Eliza Lynch (1938; F.A. Stokes)
- Brodksy, Alvin, Madame Lynch and Friend: The True Account of an Irish Adventuress and the Dictator of Paraguay Who Destroyed That American Nation (1976; Littlehampton Book Services Ltd)
- Burton, Richard, Letters from the Battle-Fields of Paraguay (1870/2005; Adamant Media Corporation; in Spanish)
- Capdevila, Luc, Una guerra total: Paraguay, 1864-1870: Ensayo de historia del tiempo presente (2020; Sb Editorial; in Spanish)
- Chesterton, Bridget María, The Grandchildren of Solano López: Frontier and Nation in Paraguay, 1904-1936 (2013; University of New Mexico Press)
- Doratioto, Francisco, Maldita Guerra: Nueva Historia de la Guerra del Paraguay (2004; Emece Editores; in Spanish)
- Esposito, Gabriele, Armies of the War of the Triple Alliance 1864-70: Paraguay, Brazil, Uruguay & Argentina (2015; Osprey Publishing)
- Escudero, Antonio Gutiérrez, Francisco Solano Lopez: Napoleon de Paraguay (1994; Anaya Publishers; in Spanish)
- Hooker, Terry D., Armies of the 19th Century: The Americas - The Paraguayan War (2008; Foundry Books)
- Kohn, Roger, Weep, Weep, Grey Bird, Weep: The Paraguayan War 1864-1870 (2008; AuthorHouse)
- Kraay, Hendrik and Whigham, Thomas L. (orgs.), I Die with My Country: Perspectives on the Paraguayan War, 1864-1870 (2005; University of Nebraska Press)
- Leuchars, Chris, To the Bitter End: Paraguay and the War of the Triple Alliance (2002; Praeger)
- Maestri, Mário, Paraguay: la república campesina, 1810-1865 (2016; Intercontinental; in Spanish)
- Plá, Josefina, The British in Paraguay, 1850-1870 (1976; The Richmond Publishing Company)
- Rees, Sián, The Shadow of Elisa Lynch (2003; Review)
- Saeger, James Schofield, Francisco Solano López and the Ruination of Paraguay: Honor and Egocentrism (2007; Rowman & Littlefield Publishers)
- Thompson, George, The War in Paraguay: With a Historical Sketch of the Country and Its People and Notes Upon the Military Engineering of the War (1869/2007; various - in the public domain)
- Whigham, Thomas, The Paraguayan War: Causes and Early Conduct (Volume 1) (2002; University of Nebraska Press)

=== The interwar period ===
- Caballero A., Ricardo, La Segunda República Paraguaya, 1869-1906: política, economía y sociedad (1985; Arte Nuevo Editores; in Spanish)
- Doratioto, Francisco, Una relación compleja, Paraguay y Brasil, 1889-1954 (2011; Editorial Tiempo de Historia; in Spanish)
- Herken-Krauer, Juan Carlos, Ferrocarriles, conspiraciones y negocios en el Paraguay, 1910-1914 (1984; Arte Nuevo Editores; in Spanish)
- Lewis, Paul H., Political Parties and Generations in Paraguay's Liberal Era, 1869-1940 (2009; University of North Carolina Press)
- Warren, Harris Gaylord, Paraguay and the Triple Alliance (1978; University of Texas Press)
- Warren, Harris Gaylord, Rebirth of the Paraguayan Republic: The First Colorado Era, 1878-1904 (1985; University of Pittsburgh Press)

=== The Chaco War ===
- English, Adrian J., The Green Hell: A Concise History of the Chaco War Between Bolivia and Paraguay, 1932-35 (2008; The History Press)
- Farcau, Bruce, The Chaco War: Bolivia and Paraguay, 1932-1935 (1996; Praeger Publishers)
- Hagedorn, Dan and Sapienza, Antonio L., Aircraft of the Chaco War 1928-1935 (2000; Schiffer Publishing Ltd.)
- Quesada, Alejandro, The Chaco War 1932-35 (2011; Osprey Publishing)
- Zook Jr., David H., The Conduct of the Chaco War (1960; Bookman Associates)

=== Modern history ===
- Alegria, Claribel and Flakoll, Darwin, Death of Somoza (1996; Curbstone Press)
- Lambert, Peter & Nickson, Andrew (eds.), The Transition to Democracy in Paraguay (1997; Palgrave Macmillan)
- Lewis, Paul, Paraguay Under Stroessner (1980; The University of North Carolina Press)
- Miranda, Carlos R., The Stroessner Era: Authoritarian Rule in Paraguay (1990; Westview Press)
- O'Shaughnessy, Hugh, The Priest of Paraguay: Fernando Lugo and the Making of a Nation (2009; Zed Books)
- Painter, James, Paraguay in the 1970s: Continuity and Change in the Political Process (1983; University of London)
- White, Richard Alan, Breaking Silence: Case That Changed the Face of Human Rights (2004; Georgetown University Press)

== Culture ==
=== Cuisine ===
- Diaz, Milton Rui, Cocina Paraguaya (2005; La Grulla; in Spanish)
- Van Houten, Lynn, Flavors of Paraguay: A Cookbook (1997; Anteater Press)

=== Indigenous Paraguayans ===
- Aren, Richard, Genocide in Paraguay (1976; Temple University Press)
- Batten, Mary, Anthropologist: Scientist of the People (2001; Houghton Mifflin)
- Bessire, L, Behold the Black Caiman: A Chronicle Of Ayoreo Life (2014; University of Chicago Press)
- Blaser, Mario, Storytelling Globalization from the Chaco and Beyond (2010; Duke University Press Books)
- Britton, A. Scott, Guarani-English/English-Guarani Concise Dictionary (2004; Hippocrene Books)
- Clastres, Helene, The Land-without-Evil: Tupi-Guarani Prophetism (1996; University of Illinois Press)
- Clastres, Pierre, Chronicle of the Guayaki Indians (1972/1998, Zone Books; originally published in French as Chronique des indiens Guayaki)
- Duckworth, Cheryl, Land and Dignity in Paraguay (2011; Continuum)
- Escobar, Ticio, The Curse of Nemur: In Search of the Art, Myth and Ritual of the Ishir (2007; University of Pittsburgh Press)
- Foote, Nicola and Horst, René D. Harder, Military Struggle and Identity Formation in Latin America: Race, Nation, and Community during the Liberal Period (2010; University Press of Florida)
- Ganson, Barbara, The Guarani Under Spanish Rule in the Rio de la Plata (2003; Stanford University Press)
- Gaska, Henryk, Constructing Ava Guarani Ethnic Identity: The Emergence of Indian Organization in Paraguay (2010; VDM Verlag Dr. Müller)
- Grubb, Wilfred Barbrooke, An Unknown People in an Unknown Land: An Account of the Life and Customs of the Lengua Indians of the Paraguayan Chaco... (1914; Cornell University Library)
- Hill, Kim and Hurtado, A. Magdalena, Ache Life History: The Ecology and Demography of a Foraging People (1996; Aldine Transaction)
- Horst, René Harder, The Stroessner Regime and Indigenous Resistance in Paraguay (2010; University Press of Florida)
- Keeney, Bradford, Guarani Shamans of the Forest (2000; Leete's Island Books)
- Maybury-Lewis, David, The Indian Peoples of Paraguay: Their Plight and Their Prospects (1980; Cultural Survival)
- Miller, Elmer S. (ed.), Peoples of the Gran Chaco (2001; Greenwood Press)
- Olivera, David A. Galeano, La Idioma y Cultura de Guarani en Paraguay (2011; Piro Tase; in Spanish)
- Olson, James Stuart, The Indians of Central and South America: an Ethnohistorical Dictionary (1991; Greenwood Press)
- Reed, Richard, Forest Dwellers, Forest Protectors: Indigenous Models for International Development (1996; Pearson)
- Reed, Richard K., Prophets of Agroforestry: Guarani Communities and Commercial Gathering (1995; University of Texas Press)
- Renshaw, John, The Indians of the Paraguayan Chaco: Identity and Economy (2002; University of Nebraska Press)
- Simoneau, Karin and Wilbert, Johannes, Folk Literature of the Ayoreo Indians (1990; University of California at LA)
- Simoneau, Karin and Wilbert, Johannes, Folk Literature of the Chamacoco Indians (1989; University of California at LA)
- Sušnik, Branislava, El indio colonial del Paraguay (1965; Museo Etnográfico "Andrés Barbero"; in Spanish)

=== Music ===
- Stover, Richard D., Six Silver Moonbeams: The Life and Times of Agustín Barrios Mangoré (1992; Querico)

== Travel and tourism ==
- Boschmann, Erwin, Paraguay - A Tour Guide (2009; Science Enterprises)
- Box, Ben, Footprint Focus Guide: Paraguay (2011; Footprint Travel Guides)
- Carver, Robert, Paradise with Serpents: Travels in the Lost World of Paraguay (2009; HarperCollins UK)
- Crespo, Martin, Magic Hour: Hora Magica en Asuncion (2013; CreateSpace Independent Publishing Platform)
- Gimlette, John, At the Tomb of the Inflatable Pig: Travels Through Paraguay (2003; Arrow)
- Goldberg, Romy Natalia, Other Places Travel Guide: Paraguay (2012, Places Publishing)
- Hebblethwaite, Margaret, Bradt Travel Guide: Paraguay (2010; Bradt Travel Guides)
- Iyer, Pico, Falling Off the Map: Some Lonely Places of The World (1994; Vintage)
- Meyer, Gordon, The River and the People (1967; Readers Union)
- Mulhall, Marion M., From Europe to Paraguay and Matto-Grosso (1877; E. Stanford)
- Smith, Julia Llwellyn, Traveling on the Edge: Journeys in the Footsteps of Graham Greene (2003; St. Martin's Griffin)
