= Juan Belaieff =

Russian and Paraguayan soldier (1875–1957)

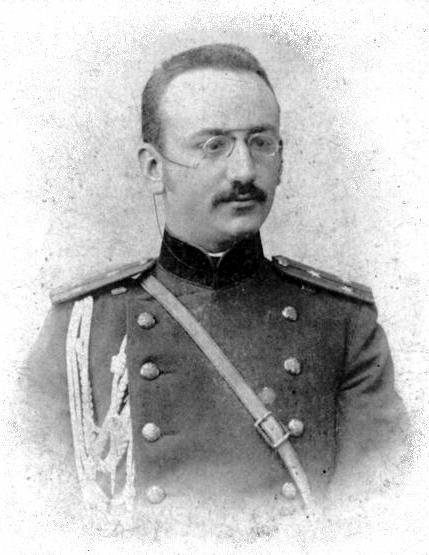
- Belaieff c. 1900
- Born: 19 April 1875; Saint Petersburg, Russia
- Died: 19 January 1957 (aged 81); Asunción, Paraguay
- Education: Michael Artillery School
- Military career
- Allegiance: Russian Empire; White Movement; Republic of Paraguay
- Branch: Imperial Russian Army; White Movement; Paraguayan Army
- Rank: Major-General
- Unit: Volunteer Army
- Conflicts: First World War; Russian Civil War; Chaco War

Juan Belaieff (Russian: Ива́н Тимофе́евич Беля́ев, romanized: Ivan Timofeyevich Belyaev; 19 April 1875 – 19 January 1957) was a Russian and Paraguayan explorer, cartographer and soldier, notable for his investigation and mapping of the Gran Chaco region and for his role as an officer in the Paraguayan army during the Chaco War.

== Biography ==
Juan Belaieff was born as Ivan Belyaev in Saint Petersburg, Russia. His father was a military officer from a noble family. Belaieff signed up with the Russian Army in 1892, and graduated from the Michael Artillery School in 1893. He participated in World War I and was promoted to the rank of colonel in 1915, and of a major-general in 1917. He was seriously wounded in 1916 and spent several months in a hospital.

When the Russian Civil War started in 1918, Belaieff joined the Volunteer Army under the command of Pyotr Wrangel. On March 25, 1920, he was evacuated from Novorossiysk to Gallipoli, and from there moved to Bulgaria and eventually in 1923 to Buenos Aires. He was interested in creating a Russian colony in South America. After failing to find enough support of the idea in Argentina, he moved in 1924 to Paraguay, where he was accepted to military service, and managed to relax the conditions for immigration of the former white movement officers who were accepted to Paraguayan military service as well. He was detached to the General Staff and founded the Engineering Department there, where he employed 12 Russian officers who arrived to Paraguay after him. He was also appointed a professor at the Military Academy. In Paraguay, he was known as Juan Belaieff.

In October 1924, Belaieff was sent on a mission to the Gran Chaco, a vast and sparsely populated area on the west bank of the Paraguay river, which needed to be explored and mapped. He was also commissioned to demarcate the boundaries with Brazil and Bolivia. In total, Beliaeff led 13 expeditions to the Gran Chaco, which he mapped, and he also established good relations with the local indigenous Maká people population who held him in high esteem. The Maká were hired as his guides and porters and Belaieff became interested in their language and culture, performing anthropological and ethnographic studies; Belaieff acquired such a deep understanding of the indigenous language that he was able to compile a dictionary. In March 1931, he became the first white person to reach Lake Pitiantuta, then the largest lake of the Gran Chaco region.

Since 1930, when the Chaco War was approaching, Belaieff was patrolling the Gran Chaco and suggesting locations for forts (including the one by Lake Pitiantuta). Although he did not participate in combat, the Paraguayan army heavily relied on his knowledge of the area. In 1932, he was promoted to the rank of a Division General (honoris causa), and since 1933, he was a councilor of the President and a member of the Army General Staff.

Juan Belaieff died in Asunción on January 19, 1957. He belonged to the Russian Orthodox Church. According to his will, after the memorial service his body was transported to the west bank of the Paraguay river, where the Gran Chaco region begins, and buried in a mausoleum inside a Maká reservation. After his death, Belaieff became a messianic deity for the Maká people.
