= Hugo Velázquez Moreno =

Paraguayan politician

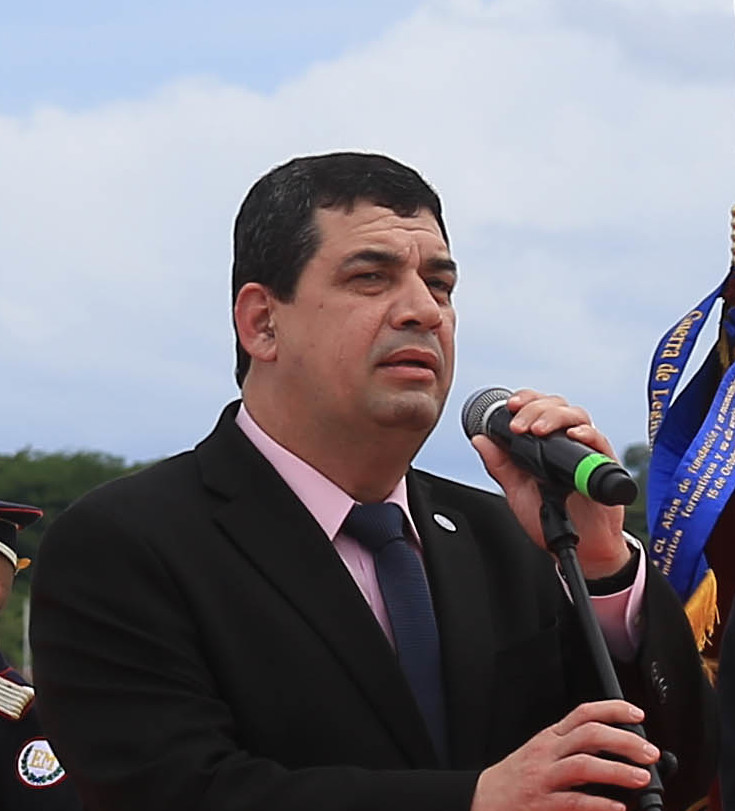
- Velázquez in 2019

30th Vice President of Paraguay
- In office 15 August 2018 – 15 August 2023
- President: Mario Abdo Benítez
- Preceded by: Alicia Pucheta
- Succeeded by: Pedro Alliana

Personal details
- Born: Hugo Adalberto Velázquez Moreno; 3 July 1966 (age 60) Asunción, Paraguay
- Party: Colorado Party
- Profession: Lawyer

Hugo Adalberto Velázquez Moreno (born 3 July 1966) is a Paraguayan politician. He is a former Deputy of the Congress of Paraguay, and he served the President of the Chamber of Deputies from 2014 to 2017. Velázquez was elected Vice President in the 2018 general elections.

In June 2022, he registered his candidacy for president in the 2023 Paraguayan general election. However, on 12 August 2022, Velázquez was designated as "significantly corrupt" by the United States Department of State, who accused him of offering a US$1 million bribe to obstruct an investigation involving him, along with an associate, Juan Carlos Duarte, legal counsel for the Yacyretá Dam, and both men had their visa revoked. As a result, Velázquez announced he was dropping his presidential candidacy, effective immediately. Velázquez also initially announced his resignation as vice president, but the following week, he reversed course and stated that he would not resign from the office, stating that there were no investigations for corruption against him in Paraguay. On 26 January 2023, the United States announced further sanctions against Velázquez, prohibiting him to do business with U.S. companies or have access to U.S. banks under the Magnitsky Act.

Political offices
Preceded by Alicia Pucheta	Vice President of Paraguay; 2018–2023	Succeeded by Pedro Alliana
