= Battle of Boquerón (1932) =

Part of the Chaco War

- Part of the Chaco War
Date	September 9–29, 1932
Location	Gran Chaco 22.773639°S 59.940861°W
Result	Paraguayan victory

Belligerents
Bolivia	Paraguay

Commanders and leaders
Filiberto Osorio; Carlos Quintanilla; F.Peña; Manuel Marzana	José F. Estigarribia; Carlos Fernandez; Luis Ayala

Strength
448 besieged and 3,500 attempting relief	7,500

Casualties and losses
2,200 killed, wounded, sick or captured	500 dead 1,500 wounded 1,000 sick
- Location within Paraguay Battle of Boquerón (1932) (South America) Battle of Boquerón (1932) (America)

The Battle of Boquerón was fought September 9–29, 1932, between the Bolivian and Paraguayan armies in and around the stronghold of Boquerón. It was the first major battle of the Chaco War. The outpost (fortín) of Boquerón, among others, had been occupied by Bolivian troops since late July 1932 following instructions of president Daniel Salamanca, which led to the escalation of what began as a border conflict into a full-scale war. The Bolivian garrison was under the command of Colonel Manuel Marzana.

The assault on Boquerón was the first move of the Paraguayan offensive that was aimed to defeat the Bolivian army and capture territory before Bolivia had fully mobilized its army and resources. Paraguayan Lt. Col. José Félix Estigarribia led the attack. The use of mortars, an unknown weapon for the Bolivian troops until then, would give the Paraguayans a decisive advantage during the siege.

The first Paraguayan assault on Boquerón was repulsed. Both sides suffered from the lack of potable water – the Paraguayans had to get it from a small lake at Isla Poí (50 km or 30 mi to the east), and although the Bolivians had wells inside their compound, they were under heavy Paraguayan fire and were eventually contaminated by the bodies of fallen soldiers. Bolivian aircraft tried with little success to resupply their troops by dropping ammunition, food and medicine – the only supplies the Bolivians managed to get from the air drops were 916 cartridges, a sack of bread and 110 pounds of dried meat. On September 12 a 3,500-man Bolivian relief column coming from the southwest was driven back near the outpost of Yucra. As the siege progressed the Paraguayans began to suffer from a shortage of water from Isla Poí due to over-extraction from the wells. In the face of these problems Estigarribia ordered an all-or-nothing attack on the stronghold on September 26. Three days later the remaining Bolivian defenders, consisting of 240 mostly wounded men, surrendered.

== Sources ==
- Latin America's Wars: The age of the professional soldier, 1900–2001. Robert L. Scheina. pp. 93–95
